= Primetime Emmy Award for Outstanding Makeup for a Single-Camera Series (Non-Prosthetic) =

Television award category

Primetime Emmy Award for Makeup for a Single-Camera Series (Non-Prosthetic)
- Awarded for: Outstanding Makeup for a Single-Camera Series (Non-Prosthetic)
- Country: United States
- Presented by: Academy of Television Arts & Sciences
- Currently held by: Euphoria (2020)
- Website: emmys.com

The Primetime Emmy Award for Outstanding Makeup for a Single-Camera Series (Non-Prosthetic) is a retired award that was presented as part of the Primetime Emmy Awards. The awards were reorganized in 2020 to recognize Outstanding Contemporary Makeup (Non-Prosthetic) and Outstanding Period and/or Character Makeup (Non-Prosthetic).

In the following list, the first titles listed in gold are the winners; those not in gold are nominees, which are listed in alphabetical order. The years given are those in which the ceremonies took place:

== Winners and nominations ==
=== 1960s ===
Outstanding Individual Achievement in the Visual Arts (Makeup)

Year	Program	Episode	Nominees	Network
1965
1965	The Magnificent Yankee (Hallmark Hall of Fame)		Bob O'Bradovich	NBC
1966
1966	Inherit the Wind (Hallmark Hall of Fame)		Bob O'Bradovich	NBC
1967
1967	Mark Twain Tonight!		Dick Smith	CBS
1967	Alice Through the Looking Glass		Claude Thompson	NBC
1968
1968	Lost in Space	"The Space Destructors"	Daniel C. Striepeke	CBS
1968	The Strange Case of Dr. Jekyll and Mr. Hyde		Dick Smith	ABC
1969
1969	And Debbie Makes Six		Claude Thompson	ABC

=== 1970s ===
Outstanding Achievement in Makeup

Year	Program	Episode	Nominees	Network
1970
1970	The Don Adams Special: Hooray for Hollywood		Louis A. Phillippi, Ray Sebastian	CBS
1970	This Is Tom Jones		Shirley Muslin, Marie Roche	ABC
1971
1971	Mission: Impossible		Robert Dawn	CBS
1971	Bewitched	"Samantha's Old Man"	Rolf Miller	ABC
1971	Hamlet		Marie Roche	NBC
1971	The Third Bill Cosby Special		Harry Blake, Perc Westmore	NBC
1972
1972	Kung Fu	"Pilot"	Frank Westmore	ABC
1972	Gideon		Harry Blake	NBC
1972	Night Gallery	"Pickman's Model"	Nick Marcellino, Leonard Engelman, John Chambers	NBC
1973
1973	Gargoyles		Stan Winston, Ellis Burman Jr., Del Armstrong	CBS
1973	Frankenstein (ABC's Wide World of Entertainment)		Marvin Westmore, Michael Westmore	ABC
1973	Dr. Jekyll and Mr. Hyde		Neville Smallwood	NBC
1973	Kung Fu		Frank Westmore	ABC
1973	The Red Pony		Richard Cobos, Allan Snyder	NBC
1973	The Waltons		Robert Sidell	CBS
1974
1974	The Autobiography of Miss Jane Pittman		Stan Winston, Rick Baker	CBS
1974	Judgment: The Trial of Julius and Ethel Rosenberg		Ben Nye	ABC
1974	The Phantom of Hollywood		William J. Tuttle	CBS
1974	Portrait: A Man Whose Name Was John		Nick Marcellino, James Lee McCoy	ABC
1975 (Note: As a juried award, nominees had to receive 50% approval to win the award. None of the nominees met the benchmark and no award was given.)
1975	Benjamin Franklin	"The Ambassador"	Mark Bussan	CBS
1975	Masquerade Party		Harry Blake, Stan Winston, Jim Kail, Ralph Gulko, Robert Ostermann, Tommy Cole, Larry Abbott	Syndicated
1975	Twigs		John Chambers, Daniel C. Striepeke	CBS
1976
1976	Eleanor and Franklin		Del Armstrong, Michael Westmore	ABC
1976	Babe		William J. Tuttle	CBS
1976	The 1975 Fashion Awards		Allan Snyder	ABC
1977
1977	Eleanor and Franklin: The White House Years		Ken Chase, Joe DiBella	ABC
1977	Beauty and the Beast		Del Acevedo, John Chambers, Daniel C. Striepeke	NBC
1977	An Evening with Diana Ross		Stan Winston	NBC
1977	Harry S. Truman: Plain Speaking		Dick Smith	PBS
1977	The Million Dollar Rip-Off		Michael Westmore, Edwin Butterworth, Charles H. Schram	NBC
1978
1978	How the West Was Won	"Part 2"	Richard Cobos, Walter Schenk	ABC
1978	The Amazing Howard Hughes		Michael Westmore, Hank Edds, Lynn F. Reynolds	CBS
1978	King		Christina Smith	NBC
1978	Little House on the Prairie	"The Fighter"	Hank Edds, Allan Snyder	NBC
1978	A Love Affair: The Eleanor and Lou Gehrig Story		Frank Westmore, Michael Westmore	NBC
1979
1979	Backstairs at the White House	"Book Four"	Tommy Cole, Mark Bussan, Ron Walters	NBC
1979	Elvis		Marvin Westmore	ABC
1979	Lady of the House		Leo Lotito Jr., Nicholas Pagliaro	NBC
1979	Roots: The Next Generations	"Part 3"	Ken Chase, Joe DiBella, Zoltan Elek, Tom Miller, David Dittmar	ABC

=== 1980s ===
Year	Program	Episode	Nominees	Network
1980
1980	The Scarlett O'Hara War		Richard Blair	NBC
1980	Beyond Westworld	"Pilot"	John Chambers, Robert Sidell	CBS
1980	Disraeli: Portrait of a Romantic	"Dizzy"	Lorraine Dawkins, Anita Harris, Sheila Mann, Mary Southgate, Brenda Yewdell	PBS
1980	Haywire		Jack Freeman	CBS
1980	Salem's Lot		Ben Lane, Jack H. Young	CBS
1981
1981	Peter and Paul		Albert Jeyte, Jim Kail	CBS
1981	The Diary of Anne Frank		Scott H. Eddo, Stanley Smith	NBC
1981	Father Damien: The Leper Priest		John Inzerella	NBC
1981	The Jayne Mansfield Story		Alan Friedman, Lona Jeffers	CBS
1981	Marilyn: The Untold Story		Alan Friedman, Lona Jeffers	ABC
1981	Masada	"Part 4"	Del Acevedo, Albert Jeyte	ABC
1982
1982	World War III		Paul Stanhope Jr.	ABC
1982	Fantasy Island	"Case Against Mr. Roarke/Save Sherlock Holmes"	Leo Lotito Jr., Nora de la Torre	ABC
1982	The Letter		Jack Freeman, Jack Barron	ABC
1982	Mae West		Richard Blair	ABC
1982	Oliver Twist		Del Acevedo, Pauline Heys	CBS
1983
1983	The Thorn Birds	"Part 4"	Del Acevedo	ABC
1983	Fame	"Not in Kansas Anymore"	Jack Wilson	NBC
1983	V		Leo Lotito Jr., Werner Keppler	NBC
1983	Who Will Love My Children?		Zoltan Elek, Monty Westmore	ABC
1984
1984	Why Me?		Michael Westmore	ABC
1984	The Day After		Michael Westmore, Zoltan Elek	ABC
1984	George Washington		Alan Fama, Rod Wilson, Jay Cannistraci	CBS
1984	The Mystic Warrior		Alan Fama, Leo Lotito Jr., Werner Keppler	ABC
1984	V: The Final Battle	"Part 2"	Leo Lotito Jr., Werner Keppler, Marvin Westmore, Alan Fama	NBC
1985
1985	The Three Wishes of Billy Grier		Michael Westmore, Robert Norin, Jamie Brown, Sandy Cooper	ABC
1985	The Burning Bed		Michael Hancock, Fred C. Blau Jr.	NBC
1985	Fatal Vision		Stephen Abrums	NBC
1985	V	"The Rescue"	Leo Lotito Jr., Marvin Westmore, Alan Fama	NBC
1985	Victims for Victims: The Theresa Saldana Story		Robert Norin	NBC

Outstanding Makeup for a Series

Year	Program	Episode	Nominees	Network
1986
1986	Airwolf	"The Horn of Plenty"	Rod Wilson	CBS
1986	Amazing Stories	"Gather Ye Acorns"	Chuck House, Michael Westmore	NBC
1986	Dynasty	"Masquerade"	Jack Freeman, Robert Sidell, Bruce Hutchinson	ABC
1987
1987	Amazing Stories	"Without Diana"	Michael Westmore, Mark Bussan, Chuck House, Fred C. Blau Jr.	NBC
1987	MacGyver	"Friends"	Rolf John Keppler, Michael Westmore, Robert Norin	ABC
1987	Max Headroom	"Security Systems"	Katalin Elek, Zoltan Elek	ABC
1987	The Tracey Ullman Show	"The Makeover"	Bari Dreiband-Burman, Thomas R. Burman	Fox
1988
1988	Star Trek: The Next Generation	"Conspiracy"	Michael Westmore, Werner Keppler, Gerald Quist	Syndicated
1988	Beauty and the Beast	"Promises of Someday"	Margaret Prentice, Rick Baker, Vincent Prentice, Fred C. Blau Jr.	CBS
1988	Beauty and the Beast	"To Reign in Hell"	Margaret Prentice, Rick Baker	CBS
1988	Highway to Heaven	"I Was a Middle-Aged Werewolf"	Hank Edds, Michael Westmore, Gerald Quist	CBS
1988	Star Trek: The Next Generation	"Coming of Age"	Michael Westmore, Werner Keppler, Gerald Quist, Rolf John Keppler	Syndicated
1989
1989	The Tracey Ullman Show	"The Subway"	Thomas R. Burman, Carol Schwratz, Bari Dreiband-Burman, Robin LaVigne	Fox
1989	Beauty and the Beast	"Brothers"	Margaret Prentice, Rick Baker, Norman Cabrera, Vincent Prentice, Fred C. Blau Jr.	CBS
1989	Star Trek: The Next Generation	"A Matter of Honor"	Michael Westmore, Gerald Quist, Jana Phillips	Syndicated

=== 1990s ===
Year	Program	Episode	Nominees	Network
1990
1990	Alien Nation	"Chains of Love"	Gerald Quist, Michael Mills, Jeremy Swan, Douglas D. Kelly	Fox
1990	The Tracey Ullman Show	"High School Sweethearts"	Thomas R. Burman, Bari Dreiband-Burman, Dale Condit, Ron Walters, Greg Nelson	Fox
1990	Star Trek: The Next Generation	"Allegiance"	Michael Westmore, Gerald Quist, June Westmore, Hank Edds, Doug Drexler, John Caglione Jr., Ron Walters	Syndicated
1990	The Tracey Ullman Show	"Creative Differences"	Dale Bach-Siss, Bari Dreiband-Burman, Thomas R. Burman, Dale Condit, Ron Walters	Fox
1991
1991	Quantum Leap	"The Leap Home, Part 1"	Gerald Quist, Michael Mills, Jeremy Swan, Douglas D. Kelly	NBC
1991	Beauty and the Beast	"In the Forests of the Night"	Margaret Prentice, Fred C. Blau Jr.	CBS
1991	L.A. Law	"God Rest Ye Murray Gentleman"	Thomas R. Burman, Bari Dreiband-Burman, Leigh Mitchell, Darrell McIntyre, Ken Diaz	NBC
1991	Star Trek: The Next Generation	"Brothers"	Michael Westmore, Gerald Quist, June Abston Haymore, Michael Mills	Syndicated
1991	Star Trek: The Next Generation	"Identity Crisis"	Michael Westmore, Gerald Quist, June Abston Haymore, Ed French, Jill Rockow, Gilbert A. Mosko	Syndicated
1992
1992	Star Trek: The Next Generation	"Cost of Living"	Michael Westmore, Gerald Quist, Ron Walters, Jane Haymore, Bob Scribner, Ken Diaz, Karen Westerfield, Richard Snell, Tania McComas	Syndicated
1992	In Living Color	"327"	Stephanie Cozart Burton, Sheryl Ptak	Fox
1992	Northern Exposure	"Cicely"	Joni Powell	CBS
1992	Perfect Strangers	"Citizenship, Part 1"	Matthew W. Mungle, Joe Hailey	ABC
1992	Tales from the Crypt	"Yellow"	Todd Masters, Michael Spatola	HBO
1993
1993	Star Trek: Deep Space Nine	"Captive Pursuit"	Michael Westmore, Jill Rockow, Karen Westerfield, Gilbert A. Mosko, Dean Jones, Michael Key, Craig Reardon, Vincent Niebla	Syndicated
1993	Dr. Quinn, Medicine Woman	"Running Ghost"	Michèle Burke, Michael Mills	CBS
1993	Saturday Night Live	"Host: Harvey Keitel"	Jennifer Aspinall	NBC
1993	Space Rangers	"Death Before Dishonor"	Marvin Westmore, Ed French	CBS
1993	Star Trek: The Next Generation	"The Inner Light"	Michael Westmore, Gerald Quist, June Abston Haymore, Karen Westerfield, Jill Rockow, Doug Drexler	Syndicated
1994
1994	Babylon 5	"The Parliament of Dreams"	Everett Burrell, Ron Pipes, John Vulich, Mary Kay Morse, Greg Funk	Syndicated
1994	Saturday Night Live	"Host: Emilio Estevez"	John Caglione Jr., Margot Boccia, Norman Bryn, Courtney Carell, Linda Castillo, Jack Engel, Linda Grimes, Robin Gurin, Roosevelt Madison Jr., Peter Montagna, Nina Port, Catherine 'Kay' Rowland, Michael R. Thomas	NBC
1994	Star Trek: Deep Space Nine	"Rules of Acquisition"	Camille Calvet, Michael Westmore, Hank Edds, Dean Gates, Dean Jones, Tina Kalliongis, Michael Key, Gil Mosko, Dave Quaschnick, Michael Smithson, Karen Westerfield	Syndicated
1994	Star Trek: The Next Generation	"Genesis"	June Westmore, Michael Westmore, Gilbert A. Mosko, Debbie Zoller, Tina Hoffman, David Quashnick, Mike Smithson, Hank Edds, Kevin Haney, Michael Key	Syndicated
1994	Tales from the Crypt	"Well Cooked Hams"	Todd Masters, Donna-Lou Henderson, Nanette Moore, Scott Wheeler	HBO
1995
1995	Star Trek: Deep Space Nine	"Distant Voices"	Michael Westmore, Camille Calvet, Dean Jones, Dean Gates, Karen Iverson, Scott Wheeler, Michael Key, David Quashnick, Karen Westerfield, Gilbert A. Mosko, Thomas E. Surprenant	Syndicated
1995	Babylon 5	"Acts of Sacrifice"	John Vulich, Everett Burrell, Cinzia Zanetti, Ron Pipes, Greg Funk, Fionagh Cush, John Wheaton, Nik E. Carey, Will Huff, Tania Wanstall, Mike Measimer	Syndicated
1995	Dr. Quinn, Medicine Woman	"Halloween II"	Lesa Nielsen, Vincent Prentice, Margaret Prentice, Jackie Tichenor, Paul Sanchez, Linda Vallejo	CBS
1995	Earth 2	"After the Thaw"	Angela Nogaro, Greg Cannom, Stephen Prouty	NBC
1995	ER	"Pilot"	Susan A. Cabral	NBC
1995	Star Trek: Voyager	"Faces"	Michael Westmore, Greg Nelson, Scott Wheeler, Tina Hoffman, Mark Shostrom, Gilbert A. Mosko, Michael Key, Barry R. Koper, Natalie Wood, Bill Myer	UPN
1996
1996	Star Trek: Voyager	"Threshold"	Michael Westmore, Greg Nelson, Scott Wheeler, Tina Hoffman, Mark Shostrom, Gilbert A. Mosko, Ellis Burman Jr., R. Stephen Weber, Brad Look	UPN
1996	Chicago Hope	"Quiet Riot"	Norman T. Leavitt, Coree Lear, Bari Dreiband-Burman, Thomas R. Burman	CBS
1996	Star Trek: Deep Space Nine	"The Visitor"	Camille Calvet, Michael Westmore, Dean Jones, Karen Iverson, Mark Bussan, Ellis Burman Jr., Scott Wheeler, Gilbert A. Mosko, David Quashnick, Thomas E. Surprenant, R. Stephen Weber, Brad Look, Kevin Haney	Syndicated
1996	Wings	"Death Becomes Him"	Tommy Cole, Ken Wensevic	NBC
1997
1997	Tracey Takes On...	"Vegas"	Ron Berkeley, Kathleen Berkeley, Thomas R. Burman, Bari Dreiband-Burman	HBO
1997	Babylon 5	"The Summoning"	Cinzia Zanetti, Ron Pipes, John Vulich, John Wheaton, Mike Measimer, Gabriel De Cunto, Rob Sherwood, Liz Dean, Fionagh Cush	Syndicated
1997	Buffy the Vampire Slayer	"Welcome to the Hellmouth"	Todd McIntosh, John Vulich, John Maldonado, John Wheaton	The WB
1997	Star Trek: Deep Space Nine	"Apocalypse Rising"	Camille Calvet, Michael Westmore, Karen Iverson, Ellis Burman Jr., R. Stephen Weber, David Quashnick, Dean Jones, Mark Bussan, Brad Look, Belinda Bryant, James MacKinnon, Allan A. Apone, Perri Sorel, Mary Kay Morse, John Maldonado, Lisa Collins, Karen Westerfield	Syndicated
1997	The X-Files	"Leonard Betts"	Laverne Munroe, Toby Lindala	Fox
1998
1998	Buffy the Vampire Slayer	"Surprise/Innocence"	Todd McIntosh, John Vulich, John Maldonado, John Wheaton, Gerald Quist, Margie Kaklamanos, Dayne Johnson, Alan Friedman, Craig Reardon, Michael F. Blake, Robin Beauchesne, Brigette A. Myre, Mark Shostrom	The WB
1998	Babylon 5	"In the Beginning"	John Vulich, John Wheaton, Jeffrey S. Farley, Mark Garbarino, Jerry Gergely, Gabriel De Cunto, Manny Case, Cinzia Zanetti, Jason Barnett, Michael S. Pack, Ron Pipes, Glen Eisner, Greg Funk	TNT
1998	Star Trek: Deep Space Nine	"Who Mourns for Morn?"	Camille Calvet, Michael Westmore, Dean Jones, Karen Iverson, Mark Bussan, Ellis Burman Jr., Karen Westerfield, Mary Kay Morse, Belinda Bryant, Joe Podnar, Suzanne Diaz, Jill Rockow, David Quashnick, Bernd Rantscheff	Syndicated
1998	Tracey Takes On...	"Culture"	Ron Berkeley, Kathleen Berkeley, Thomas R. Burman, Bari Dreiband-Burman	HBO
1998	The X-Files	"The Post-Modern Prometheus"	Laverne Munroe, Pearl Louie, Toby Lindala, Dave Coughtry, Rachel Griffin, Robin Lindala, Leanne Rae Podavin, Brad Proctor, Geoff Redknap, Tony Wohlgemuth, Wayne Dang, Vince Yoshida	Fox
1999
1999	The X-Files	"Two Fathers/One Son"	Cheri Montesanto, Laverne Munroe, John Vulich, Kevin Westmore, Greg Funk, John Wheaton, Mark Shostrom, Rick Stratton, Jake Garber, Craig Reardon, Fionagh Cush, Steve LaPorte, Kevin Haney, Jane Aull, Perri Sorel, Jeanne Van Phue, Julie Socash	Fox
1999	Buffy the Vampire Slayer	"The Zeppo"	Todd McIntosh, John Wheaton, Robin Beauchesne, Douglas Noe, Jamie Kelman, Craig Reardon, John Vulich, John Maldonado, Brigette A. Myre, Ed French, Blake Shepard, Erwin H. Kupitz	The WB
1999	Saturday Night Live	"Host: Brendan Fraser"	Louie Zakarian, Andrea Miller, Vincent J. Guastini	NBC
1999	Star Trek: Deep Space Nine	"The Dogs of War"	Camille Calvet, Michael Westmore, Dean Jones, Mark Bussan, Mary Kay Morse, Ellis Burman Jr., Belinda Bryant, Karen Iverson, Karen Westerfield, Brad Look, David Quashnick, Earl Ellis, Joe Podnar, R. Stephen Weber, Jeff Lewis, Sandi Rowden, Toby Lamm, Michael F. Blake, June Westmore, Judith Silverman, Craig Smith, Kevin Haney, Suzanne Diaz, Scott Wheeler, James Rohland, Tina Hoffman, Natalie Wood	Syndicated
1999	Tracey Takes On...	"America"	Ron Berkeley, Kathleen Berkeley, Thomas R. Burman, Bari Dreiband-Burman	HBO

=== 2000s ===
Year	Program	Episode	Nominees	Network
2000
2000	The X-Files	"Theef"	Cheri Montesanto, Kevin Westmore, Laverne Munroe, Greg Funk, Cindy J. Williams	Fox
2000	Angel	"The Ring"	Dayne Johnson, David DeLeon, Louis Lazzara, Steve LaPorte, Rick Stratton, Jill Rockow, Toby Lamm, Jeremy Swan, Stephen Prouty, Earl Ellis, Dalia Dokter, Robert Maverick	The WB
2000	MADtv	"Movie Show"	Jennifer Aspinall, Felicia Linsky, Ed French, Myke Michaels, Randy Westgate, R. Stephen Weber, Susan A. Cabral, Courtney Carell, Julie Purcell	Fox
2000	Star Trek: Voyager	"Ashes to Ashes"	Michael Westmore, Scott Wheeler, Tina Hoffman, James Rohland, Suzanne Diaz, Natalie Wood, Ellis Burman Jr., David Quashnick, Belinda Bryant, Jeff Lewis	UPN
2000	That '70s Show	"Vanstock"	Mark Sanchez, Cindy Gardner, Jay Wejebe	Fox
2001
2001	The Sopranos	"Employee of the Month"	Kymbra Callaghan, Stephen Kelley	HBO
2001	The X-Files	"Deadalive"	Cheri Montesanto, Matthew W. Mungle, Laverne Munroe, Clinton Wayne, Robin L. Neal	Fox
2001	MADtv	"MADtv's 2nd Annual Salute to the Movies"	Jennifer Aspinall, Felicia Linsky, Stephanie L. Massie, Darrell McIntyre, Randy Westgate, Julie Purcell, Ed French, Susan A. Cabral, Myke Michaels	Fox
2001	Sex and the City	"Don't Ask, Don't Tell"	Judy Chin, Marjorie Durand, Nicki Ledermann	HBO
2001	Star Trek: Voyager	"The Void"	Michael Westmore, Tina Hoffman, Scott Wheeler, James Rohland, Suzanne Diaz, Natalie Wood, Ellis Burman Jr., Jeff Lewis, Brad Look, Belinda Bryant, Joe Podnar, David Quashnick, Karen Westerfield, Earl Ellis	UPN

Outstanding Makeup for a Series (Non-Prosthetic)
The award was divided to recognize Makeup for a Series (Non-Prosthetic) and Prosthetic Makeup for a Series.

Year	Program	Episode	Nominees	Network
2002
2002	CSI: Crime Scene Investigation	"Slaves of Las Vegas"	Nicholas Pagliaro, Melanie Levitt, John Goodwin	CBS
2002	Alias	"Q&A"	Angela Nogaro, Diana Brown	ABC
2002	Buffy the Vampire Slayer	"Hell's Bells"	Todd McIntosh, Jay Wejebe, Carol Schwartz, Brigette A. Myre	UPN
2002	MADtv	"701"	Jennifer Aspinall, Scott Wheeler, Randy Westgate, Julie Purcell, Stephanie L. Massie, Felicia Linsky, Darrell McIntyre	Fox
2002	Six Feet Under	"Pilot"	Donna-Lou Henderson, Justin B. Henderson, June Bracken	HBO
2003
2003	Alias	"The Counteragent"	Angela Nogaro, Diana Brown, Kaori N. Turner	ABC
2003	CSI: Crime Scene Investigation	"Lady Heather's Box"	Nicholas Pagliaro, Melanie Levitt, John Goodwin, Jackie Tichenor	CBS
2003	MADtv	"801"	Jennifer Aspinall, Scott Wheeler, Randy Westgate, James Rohland, Julie Purcell	Fox
2003	Sex and the City	"Plus One Is The Loneliest Number"	Judy Chin, Nicki Ledermann, Kerrie R. Plant, Maryann Marchetti	HBO
2003	Six Feet Under	"Perfect Circles"	Donna-Lou Henderson, Justin B. Henderson, Megan Moore	HBO
2004
2004	Gilmore Girls	"The Festival of Living Art"	Marie Del Prete, Malanie J. Romero, Mike Smithson	The WB
2004	Carnivàle	"Babylon"	Steve Artmont, Simone Almekias-Siegl	HBO
2004	CSI: Crime Scene Investigation	"Assume Nothing/All for Our Country"	Nicholas Pagliaro, Melanie Levitt, John Goodwin, Jackie Tichenor	CBS
2004	Deadwood	"Here Was a Man"	John Rizzo, Adam Brandy, Brian McManus, Deborah McNulty	HBO
2004	Nip/Tuck	"Adelle Coffin"	Eryn Krueger Mekash, Stephanie A. Fowler, Thomas R. Burman, Bari Dreiband-Burman	FX
2005
2005	Deadwood	"A Lie Agreed Upon, Part 1"	John Rizzo, Ron Snyder, Adam Brandy, Deborah McNulty	HBO
2005	Carnivàle	"Alamogordo, N.M."	Steve Artmont, Simone Almekias-Siegl, Heather Plott	HBO
2005	CSI: Crime Scene Investigation	"Ch-Changes"	Melanie Levitt, Matthew W. Mungle, Perri Sorel, Pam Phillips	CBS
2005	MADtv	"1004"	Jennifer Aspinall, Scott Wheeler, Randy Westgate, Nathalie Fratti	Fox
2005	Nip/Tuck	"Julia McNamara"	Eryn Krueger Mekash, Stephanie A. Fowler	FX
2006
2006	Black. White.	"Episode 1"	Brian Sipe, Keith VanderLaan, Will Huff	FX
2006	Grey's Anatomy	"Owner of a Lonely Heart"	Norman T. Leavitt, Brigitte Bugayong, Thomas R. Burman, Bari Dreiband-Burman	ABC
2006	MADtv	"1109"	Jennifer Aspinall, Heather Mages, Nathalie Fratti, David Williams	Fox
2006	Nip/Tuck	"Quentin Costa"	Eryn Krueger Mekash, Stephanie A. Fowler, Debbie Zoller, Michele Tyminski Schoenbach	FX
2006	Rome	"Caesarion"	Maurizio Silvi, Francesco Nardi, Federico Laurenti, Laura Tonello	HBO
2006	Will & Grace	"The Finale"	Patricia Bunch, Karen Kawahara, Farah Bunch, Greg Cannom	NBC
2007
2007	Deadwood	"I Am Not the Fine Man You Take Me For"	John Rizzo, Ron Snyder, Bob Scribner, James R. Scribner	HBO
2007	CSI: Crime Scene Investigation	"Fannysmackin'"	Melanie Levitt, Tom Hoerber, Clinton Wayne, Matthew W. Mungle	CBS
2007	CSI: NY	"Wasted"	Perri Sorel, Rela Martine, James MacKinnon, John Goodwin	CBS
2007	Dancing with the Stars	"303"	Melanie Mills, Zena Shteysel, Patti Ramsey Bortoli, Nadege Schoenfeld	ABC
2007	MADtv	"1210"	Jennifer Aspinall, Heather Mages, James Rohland, David Williams	Fox
2007	Rome	"De Patre Vostro (About Your Father)"	Maurizio Silvi, Francesco Nardi, Federico Laurenti, Laura Tonello	HBO

Outstanding Makeup for a Single-Camera Series (Non-Prosthetic)
Beginning in 2008, the award was split to honor Single-Camera Series and Outstanding Makeup for a Multi-Camera Series or Special (Non-Prosthetic).

Year	Program	Episode	Nominees	Network
2008	Tracey Ullman's State of the Union	"102"	Sally Sutton, Matthew W. Mungle	Showtime
2008	CSI: Crime Scene Investigation	"Dead Doll"	Melanie Levitt, Tom Hoerber, Clinton Wayne, Matthew W. Mungle	CBS
2008	Grey's Anatomy	"Crash Into Me"	Norman T. Leavitt, Brigitte Bugayong, Shauna Giesbrecht, Michele Teleis-Fickle	ABC
2008	Mad Men	"The Hobo Code"	Debbie Zoller, Ron Pipes, Suzanne Diaz	AMC
2008	Pushing Daisies	"Dummy"	Todd McIntosh, David DeLeon, Brad Look	ABC
2009	Pushing Daisies	"Dim Sum Lose Some"	Todd McIntosh, David DeLeon, Steven E. Anderson	ABC
2009	Grey's Anatomy	"Dream a Little Dream of Me"	Norman T. Leavitt, Brigitte Bugayong, Michele Teleis-Fickle	ABC
2009	Little Britain USA	"106"	John E. Jackson, Chris Burgoyne, Matthew W. Mungle	HBO
2009	Mad Men	"The Jet Set"	Debbie Zoller, Denise DellaValle, Ron Pipes, Debra Schrey	AMC
2009	Nip/Tuck	"Giselle Blaylock and Legend Chandler"	Eryn Krueger Mekash, Stephanie A. Fowler	FX

=== 2010s ===
Year	Program	Episode	Nominees	Network
2010	Grey's Anatomy	"Suicide Is Painless"	Norman T. Leavitt, Brigitte Bugayong, Michele Teleis-Fickle	ABC
2010	Castle	"Vampire Weekend"	Debbie Zoller, Debra Schrey, Rebecca Alling, Steven E. Anderson, David DeLeon, Sara Vaughn	ABC
2010	Glee	"The Power of Madonna"	Eryn Krueger Mekash, Kelley Mitchell, Jennifer Greenberg, Robin L. Neal, Kelcey Fry, Zoe Hay	Fox
2010	Glee	"Theatricality"	Eryn Krueger Mekash, Kelley Mitchell, Trent Cotner, Jennifer Greenberg, Mike Mekash	Fox
2010	Mad Men	"Souvenir"	Lana Grossman, Ron Pipes, Maggie Fung, Kate Shorter, Bonita DeHaven, Angie Wells	AMC
2011	Boardwalk Empire	"Boardwalk Empire"	Nicki Ledermann, Evelyne Noraz	HBO
2011	Game of Thrones	"Winter Is Coming"	Paul Engelen, Melissa Lackersteen	HBO
2011	Glee	"The Rocky Horror Glee Show"	Eryn Krueger Mekash, Jennifer Greenberg, Robin L. Neal, Mike Mekash	Fox
2011	Mad Men	"The Rejected"	Lana Grossman, Ron Pipes, Maurine Schlenz, Mary Kay Morse, Tricia Sawyer	AMC
2011	True Blood	"9 Crimes"	Brigette A. Myre, Lana Grossman	HBO
2012	Game of Thrones	"The Old Gods and the New"	Paul Engelen, Melissa Lackersteen	HBO
2012	Boardwalk Empire	"Georgia Peaches"	Michele Paris, Mary Aaron, Steven Lawrence	HBO
2012	Glee	"Yes/No"	Kelley Mitchell, Jennifer Greenberg, Melissa Buell, Shutchai Tym Buacharern, Paula Jane Hamilton, Darla Albright	Fox
2012	Mad Men	"Christmas Waltz"	Lana Grossman, Ron Pipes, Ken Niederbaumer, Keith Sayer	AMC
2012	The Middle	"The Play"	Tyson Fountaine, Heather Cummings, Michelle Daurio, Tifanie White, Brian Kinney, Elizabeth Dahl	ABC
2013	Game of Thrones	"Kissed by Fire"	Paul Engelen, Melissa Lackersteen, Daniel Lawson Johnston, Martina Byrne	HBO
2013	Boardwalk Empire	"Resolution"	Michele Paris, Steven Lawrence, Anette Lian-Williams	HBO
2013	The Borgias	"The Gunpowder Plot"	Vincenzo Mastrantonio, Katia Sisto, Federico Laurenti, Jekaterina Oertel	Showtime
2013	Glee	"Guilty Pleasures"	Kelley Mitchell, Jennifer Greenberg, Melissa Buell, Tanya Cookingham	Fox
2013	Mad Men	"The Doorway"	Lana Grossman, Ron Pipes, Ken Niederbaumer, Maurine Burke, Cyndilee Rice	AMC
2013	Once Upon a Time	"The Evil Queen"	Sarah Graham, Juliana Vit, Naomi Bakstad	ABC
2014	True Detective	"The Secret Fate of All Life"	Felicity Bowring, Wendy Bell, Ann Pala, Kim Perrodin, Linda Dowds	HBO
2014	Boardwalk Empire	"New York Sour"	Michele Paris, Steven Lawrence, Anette Lian-Williams	HBO
2014	Breaking Bad	"Ozymandias"	Tarra D. Day, Corey Welk	AMC
2014	Game of Thrones	"Oathkeeper"	Jane Walker, Annie McEwan	HBO
2014	Mad Men	"The Runaways"	Lana Grossman, Ron Pipes, Ken Niederbaumer, Maurine Burke, Jennifer Greenberg	AMC
2015	Game of Thrones	"Mother's Mercy"	Jane Walker, Nicola Matthews	HBO
2015	Boardwalk Empire	"What Jesus Said"	Michele Paris, Joseph Farulla, Alexandra Urvois	HBO
2015	The Knick	"Method and Madness"	Nicki Ledermann, Stephanie Pasicov, Sunday Englis, Cassandra Saulter, Michael Laudati, LuAnn Claps	Cinemax
2015	Mad Men	"Person to Person"	Lana Grossman, Ron Pipes, Maurine Burke, Jennifer Greenberg	AMC
2015	Sons of Anarchy	"Faith and Despondency"	Tracey Anderson, Michelle Garbin, Sabine Roller, Tami Lane	FX
2016	Game of Thrones	"Battle of the Bastards"	Jane Walker, Kate Thompson, Nicola Mathews, Kay Bilk, Marianna Kyriacou, Pamela Smyth	HBO
2016	The Knick	"Whiplash"	Nicki Ledermann, Stephanie Pasicov, Sunday Englis, Tania Ribalow, Rachel Geary, LuAnn Claps	Cinemax
2016	Penny Dreadful	"Glorious Horrors"	Enzo Mastrantonio, Clare Lambe, Caterina Sisto, Lorraine McCrann, Morna Ferguson	Showtime
2016	Vikings	"Yol"	Tom McInerney, Katie Derwin, Ciara Scannel	History
2016	Vinyl	"Pilot"	Nicki Ledermann, Tania Ribalow, Sunday Englis, Rachel Geary, Michael Laudati, Cassandra Saulter	HBO
2017
2017	Westworld	"The Original"	Christien Tinsley, Myriam Arougheti, Gerald Quist, Lydia Milars, Ed French	HBO
2017	Penny Dreadful	"Perpetual Night"	Enzo Mastrantonio, Clare Lambe, Caterina Sisto, Lorraine McCrann, Morna Ferguson	Showtime
2017	Stranger Things	"Chapter Six: The Monster"	Myke Michaels, Teresa Vest	Netflix
2017	This Is Us	"I Call Marriage"	Zoe Hay, Heather Plott, Elizabeth Hoel-Chang, Judith Lynn Staats, John Damiani	NBC
2017	Vikings	"All His Angels"	Tom McInerney, Katie Derwin, Ciara Scannel, Lizzanne Procter	History
2018
2018	Westworld	"Akane No Mai"	Elisa Marsh, Allan A. Apone, Rachel Hoke, John Damiani, Ron Pipes, Ken Diaz	HBO
2018	Game of Thrones	"The Dragon and the Wolf"	Jane Walker, Kay Bilk, Marianna Kyriacou, Pamela Smyth, Kate Thompson, Nicola Matthews	HBO
2018	GLOW	"Money's in the Chase"	Lana Horochowski, Maurine Burke, Lesa Nielson Duff, Melissa Buell, Kristina Frisch	Netflix
2018	The Handmaid's Tale	"Unwomen"	Burton LeBlanc, Talia Reingold, Erika Caceres	Hulu
2018	This Is Us	"Number Three"	Zoe Hay, Heather Plott, Luis Garcia, Elizabeth Hoel-Chang, Tania McComas	NBC
2018	Vikings	"Homeland"	Tom McInerney, Katie Derwin, Lizzanne Procter, Ciara Scannel, Deirdre Fitzgerald, Kate Donnelly	History
2019
2019	Game of Thrones	"The Long Night"	Jane Walker, Kay Bilk, Marianna Kyriacou, Nicola Matthews, Pamela Smyth	HBO
2019	American Horror Story: Apocalypse	"Forbidden Fruit"	Eryn Krueger Mekash, Kim Ayers, Michael Mekash, Silvina Knight, Jamie Leigh DeVilla	FX
2019	GLOW	"The Good Twin"	Lana Horochowski, Maurine Burke, Lesa Nielson Duff, Melissa Buell, Kristina Frisch	Netflix
2019	The Marvelous Mrs. Maisel	"We're Going to the Catskills!"	Patricia Regan, Claus Lulla, Joseph Campayno	Amazon
2019	Pose	"Pilot"	Sherri Laurence, Nicky Pattison Illum, Chris Milone, Deja Smith, Lucy O'Reilly, Andrew Sotomayor	FX

=== 2020s ===
Year	Program	Episode	Nominees	Network
2020
2020	Euphoria	"And Salt the Earth Behind You"	Doniella Davy, Kirsten Sage Coleman, Tara Lang Shah	HBO
2020	Big Little Lies	"She Knows"	Michelle Radow, Erin Rosenmann, Karen Rentrop, Molly R. Stern, Angela Levin, Simone Almekias-Siegl, Miho Suzuki, Claudia Humburg	HBO
2020	The Handmaid's Tale	"Mayday"	Burton LeBlanc, Alastair Muir	Hulu
2020	Ozark	"In Case Of Emergency"	Tracy Ewell, Jillian Erickson, Jack Lazzaro, Susan Reilly Lehane	Netflix
2020	The Politician	"The Assassination of Payton Hobart"	Autumn Butler, Caitlin Martini Emery, Debra Schrey, Emma Burton	Netflix
2020	Schitt's Creek	"Happy Ending"	Candice Ornstein, Lucky Bromhead	Pop TV

== Programs with multiple awards ==
5 awards

- Game of Thrones

3 awards

- The X-Files

2 awards

- Deadwood
- Star Trek: Deep Space Nine
- Star Trek: The Next Generation
- The Tracey Ullman Show
- Westworld

== Programs with multiple nominations ==
9 nominations

- Star Trek: The Next Generation

8 nominations

- Game of Thrones
- Mad Men

7 nominations

- Star Trek: Deep Space Nine

6 nominations

- CSI: Crime Scene Investigation

5 nominations

- Boardwalk Empire
- Glee
- The X-Files

4 nominations

- Babylon 5
- Beauty and the Beast
- Buffy the Vampire Slayer
- Grey's Anatomy
- Nip/Tuck
- Star Trek: Voyager
- The Tracey Ullman Show

3 nominations

- Deadwood
- Tracey Takes On...
- Vikings

2 nominations

- Alias
- Amazing Stories
- Carnivàle
- Dr. Quinn, Medicine Woman
- GLOW
- The Knick
- Kung Fu
- Penny Dreadful
- Pushing Daisies
- Rome
- Sex and the City
- Six Feet Under
- Tales from the Crypt
- This Is Us
- Westworld
