= Judith A. Cory =

- Other names: Judy Cory; Judith Alexander Cory; Judith Cory; Judy Alexander Cory
- Occupation: Make-up artist
- Years active: 1967-2005

Judith A. Cory is a make-up artist. She worked on 58 films from 1967 to 2005.

== Oscar nominations ==
Both nominations were in the category of Best Makeup.

- 1994 Academy Awards-Nominated for Forrest Gump, nomination shared with Hallie D'Amore and Daniel C. Striepeke. Lost to Ed Wood.
- 1993 Academy Awards-Nominated for Schindler's List, nomination shared with Christina Smith and Matthew W. Mungle. Lost to Mrs. Doubtfire.

== Selected filmography ==
- Meet the Fockers (2004)
- The Matrix Revolutions (2003)
- The Matrix Reloaded (2003)
- Evolution (2001)
- The Haunting (1999)
- The Lost World: Jurassic Park (1997)
- Forrest Gump (1994)
- Schindler's List (1993)
- Hook (1991)
