= Academy Award for Best Makeup and Hairstyling =

Entertainment award

- Country: United States
- Presented by: Academy of Motion Picture Arts and Sciences (AMPAS)
- First award: March 29, 1982; 44 years ago (for films released in 1981)
- Most recent winner: Mike Hill; Jordan Samuel; Cliona Furey; Frankenstein (2025)
- Website: oscars.org

The Academy Award for Best Makeup and Hairstyling is the Academy Award given to the best achievement in makeup and hairstyling for film. Traditionally, three films have been nominated each year with exceptions in the early 1980s and 2002 when there were only two nominees; in 1999, when there were four nominees. Beginning with the 92nd Academy Awards, five films were nominated.

The competitive category was created in 1981 as the Academy Award for Best Makeup, after the academy received complaints that the makeup work in The Elephant Man (1980) was not being honored. Although no award was given to The Elephant Man, an entire category dedicated to honoring makeup effects in film was created for subsequent ceremonies. Previously, makeup artists were only eligible for special achievement awards for their work.

Ahead of nominations, a shortlist of titles is chosen by the makeup branch's executive committee and clips are screened by the members of the branch at an annual "bake-off." After only two films were shortlisted in 2002, rules were installed requiring that seven finalists be chosen each year with the top three becoming nominees. Beginning in 2020, the shortlist expanded from seven finalists to ten.

In 2012, the category was given its current name for use in the 85th Academy Awards and onward. Makeup artist Rick Baker holds the record for both most wins (7) and most nominations (11) for this award.

== Special Achievement Awards ==
Before 1981, Special Achievement Oscars were twice awarded to makeup artists for their work on a specific film:

- 1964 – William J. Tuttle for 7 Faces of Dr. Lao
- 1968 – John Chambers for Planet of the Apes

== Hairstylists ==
Starting in 1993, the award is to be shared with hairstylists if hair effects "contribute greatly to the appearance and effect of the characters".

== Winners and nominees ==
In the following table, the years are listed as per Academy convention, and generally correspond to the year of film release; the ceremonies are always held the following year. Films in dark blue background have received a Special/Honorary Award; those in yellow background have won a regular Academy Award of Merit.

Non-competitive/Honorary Award winner
Academy Award of Merit winner

=== 1960s ===
Year	Film	Nominees
1964 (37th)	7 Faces of Dr. Lao	William J. Tuttle
1968 (41st)	Planet of the Apes	John Chambers

=== 1980s ===
Year	Film	Nominees
1981 (54th)	An American Werewolf in London	Rick Baker
1981 (54th)	Heartbeeps	Stan Winston
1982 (55th)	Quest for Fire	Sarah Monzani and Michèle Burke
1982 (55th)	Gandhi	Tom Smith
1984 (57th)	Amadeus	Paul LeBlanc and Dick Smith
1984 (57th)	2010: The Year We Make Contact	Michael Westmore
1984 (57th)	Greystoke: The Legend of Tarzan, Lord of the Apes	Rick Baker and Paul Engelen
1985 (58th)	Mask	Michael Westmore and Zoltan Elek
1985 (58th)	The Color Purple	Ken Chase
1985 (58th)	Remo Williams: The Adventure Begins	Carl Fullerton
1986 (59th)	The Fly	Chris Walas and Stephan Dupuis
1986 (59th)	The Clan of the Cave Bear	Michael Westmore and Michèle Burke
1986 (59th)	Legend	Rob Bottin and Peter Robb-King
1987 (60th)	Harry and the Hendersons	Rick Baker
1987 (60th)	Happy New Year	Bob Laden
1988 (61st)	Beetlejuice	Ve Neill, Steve La Porte, and Robert Short
1988 (61st)	Coming to America	Rick Baker
1988 (61st)	Scrooged	Thomas R. Burman and Bari Dreiband-Burman
1989 (62nd)	Driving Miss Daisy	Manlio Rocchetti, Lynn Barber, and Kevin Haney
1989 (62nd)	The Adventures of Baron Munchausen	Maggie Weston and Fabrizio Sforza
1989 (62nd)	Dad	Dick Smith, Ken Diaz, and Greg Nelson

=== 1990s ===
Year	Film	Nominees
1990 (63rd)	Dick Tracy	John Caglione Jr. and Doug Drexler
1990 (63rd)	Cyrano de Bergerac	Michèle Burke and Jean-Pierre Eychenne
1990 (63rd)	Edward Scissorhands	Ve Neill and Stan Winston
1991 (64th)	Terminator 2: Judgment Day	Stan Winston and Jeff Dawn
1991 (64th)	Hook	Christina Smith, Monty Westmore, and Greg Cannom
1991 (64th)	Star Trek VI: The Undiscovered Country	Michael Mills, Edward French, and Richard Snell
1992 (65th)	Bram Stoker's Dracula	Greg Cannom, Michèle Burke, and Matthew W. Mungle
1992 (65th)	Batman Returns	Ve Neill, Ronnie Specter, and Stan Winston
1992 (65th)	Hoffa	Ve Neill, Greg Cannom, and John Blake
1993 (66th)	Mrs. Doubtfire	Greg Cannom, Ve Neill, and Yolanda Toussieng
1993 (66th)	Philadelphia	Carl Fullerton and Alan D'Angerio
1993 (66th)	Schindler's List	Christina Smith, Matthew W. Mungle, and Judith A. Cory
1994 (67th)	Ed Wood	Rick Baker, Ve Neill, and Yolanda Toussieng
1994 (67th)	Forrest Gump	Daniel C. Striepeke, Hallie D'Amore, and Judith A. Cory
1994 (67th)	Mary Shelley's Frankenstein	Daniel Parker, Paul Engelen, and Carol Hemming
1995 (68th)	Braveheart	Peter Frampton, Paul Pattison, and Lois Burwell
1995 (68th)	My Family	Ken Diaz and Mark Sanchez
1995 (68th)	Roommates	Greg Cannom, Bob Laden, and Colleen Callaghan
1996 (69th)	The Nutty Professor	Rick Baker and David LeRoy Anderson
1996 (69th)	Ghosts of Mississippi	Matthew W. Mungle and Deborah La Mia Denaver
1996 (69th)	Star Trek: First Contact	Michael Westmore, Scott Wheeler, and Jake Garber
1997 (70th)	Men in Black	Rick Baker and David LeRoy Anderson
1997 (70th)	Mrs Brown	Lisa Westcott, Veronica Brebner, and Beverley Binda
1997 (70th)	Titanic	Tina Earnshaw, Greg Cannom, and Simon Thompson
1998 (71st)	Elizabeth	Jenny Shircore
1998 (71st)	Saving Private Ryan	Lois Burwell, Conor O'Sullivan, and Daniel C. Striepeke
1998 (71st)	Shakespeare in Love	Lisa Westcott and Veronica Brebner
1999 (72nd)	Topsy-Turvy	Christine Blundell and Trefor Proud
1999 (72nd)	Austin Powers: The Spy Who Shagged Me	Michèle Burke and Mike Smithson
1999 (72nd)	Bicentennial Man	Greg Cannom
1999 (72nd)	Life	Rick Baker

=== 2000s ===
Year	Film	Nominees
2000 (73rd)	How the Grinch Stole Christmas	Rick Baker and Gail Ryan
2000 (73rd)	The Cell	Michèle Burke and Edouard F. Henriques
2000 (73rd)	Shadow of the Vampire	Ann Buchanan and Amber Sibley
2001 (74th)	The Lord of the Rings: The Fellowship of the Ring	Peter Owen and Richard Taylor
2001 (74th)	A Beautiful Mind	Greg Cannom and Colleen Callaghan
2001 (74th)	Moulin Rouge!	Maurizio Silvi and Aldo Signoretti
2002 (75th)	Frida	John E. Jackson and Beatrice De Alba
2002 (75th)	The Time Machine	John M. Elliott Jr. and Barbara Lorenz
2003 (76th)	The Lord of the Rings: The Return of the King	Richard Taylor and Peter King
2003 (76th)	Master and Commander: The Far Side of the World	Edouard F. Henriques and Yolanda Toussieng
2003 (76th)	Pirates of the Caribbean: The Curse of the Black Pearl	Ve Neill and Martin Samuel
2004 (77th)	Lemony Snicket's A Series of Unfortunate Events	Valli O'Reilly and Bill Corso
2004 (77th)	The Passion of the Christ	Keith VanderLaan and Christien Tinsley
2004 (77th)	The Sea Inside	Jo Allen and Manuel García
2005 (78th)	The Chronicles of Narnia: The Lion, the Witch and the Wardrobe	Howard Berger and Tami Lane
2005 (78th)	Cinderella Man	David LeRoy Anderson and Lance Anderson
2005 (78th)	Star Wars: Episode III – Revenge of the Sith	Dave Elsey and Nikki Gooley
2006 (79th)	Pan's Labyrinth	David Martí and Montse Ribé
2006 (79th)	Apocalypto	Aldo Signoretti and Vittorio Sodano
2006 (79th)	Click	Kazuhiro Tsuji and Bill Corso
2007 (80th)	La Vie en Rose	Didier Lavergne and Jan Archibald
2007 (80th)	Norbit	Rick Baker and Kazuhiro Tsuji
2007 (80th)	Pirates of the Caribbean: At World's End	Ve Neill and Martin Samuel
2008 (81st)	The Curious Case of Benjamin Button	Greg Cannom
2008 (81st)	The Dark Knight	John Caglione Jr. and Conor O'Sullivan
2008 (81st)	Hellboy II: The Golden Army	Mike Elizalde and Thomas Floutz
2009 (82nd)	Star Trek	Barney Burman, Mindy Hall, and Joel Harlow
2009 (82nd)	Il divo	Aldo Signoretti and Vittorio Sodano
2009 (82nd)	The Young Victoria	Jon Henry Gordon and Jenny Shircore

=== 2010s ===
Year	Film	Nominees
2010 (83rd)	The Wolfman	Rick Baker and Dave Elsey
2010 (83rd)	Barney's Version	Adrien Morot
2010 (83rd)	The Way Back	Edouard F. Henriques, Gregory Funk, and Yolanda Toussieng
2011 (84th)	The Iron Lady	Mark Coulier and J. Roy Helland
2011 (84th)	Albert Nobbs	Martial Corneville, Lynn Johnston, and Matthew W. Mungle
2011 (84th)	Harry Potter and the Deathly Hallows – Part 2	Nick Dudman, Amanda Knight, and Lisa Tomblin
2012 (85th)	Les Misérables	Lisa Westcott and Julie Dartnell
2012 (85th)	Hitchcock	Howard Berger, Peter Montagna, and Martin Samuel
2012 (85th)	The Hobbit: An Unexpected Journey	Peter Swords King, Rick Findlater, and Tami Lane
2013 (86th)	Dallas Buyers Club	Adruitha Lee and Robin Mathews
2013 (86th)	Jackass Presents: Bad Grandpa	Stephen Prouty
2013 (86th)	The Lone Ranger	Joel Harlow and Gloria Pasqua-Casny
2014 (87th)	The Grand Budapest Hotel	Frances Hannon and Mark Coulier
2014 (87th)	Foxcatcher	Bill Corso and Dennis Liddiard
2014 (87th)	Guardians of the Galaxy	Elizabeth Yianni-Georgiou and David White
2015 (88th)	Mad Max: Fury Road	Lesley Vanderwalt, Elka Wardega and Damian Martin
2015 (88th)	The 100-Year-Old Man Who Climbed Out of the Window and Disappeared	Love Larson and Eva von Bahr
2015 (88th)	The Revenant	Siân Grigg, Duncan Jarman, and Robert Pandini
2016 (89th)	Suicide Squad	Alessandro Bertolazzi, Giorgio Gregorini, and Christopher Nelson
2016 (89th)	A Man Called Ove	Eva von Bahr and Love Larson
2016 (89th)	Star Trek Beyond	Joel Harlow and Richard Alonzo
2017 (90th)	Darkest Hour	Kazuhiro Tsuji, David Malinowski, and Lucy Sibbick
2017 (90th)	Victoria & Abdul	Daniel Phillips and Lou Sheppard
2017 (90th)	Wonder	Arjen Tuiten
2018 (91st)	Vice	Greg Cannom, Kate Biscoe, and Patricia Dehaney
2018 (91st)	Border	Göran Lundström and Pamela Goldammer
2018 (91st)	Mary Queen of Scots	Jenny Shircore, Marc Pilcher, and Jessica Brooks
2019 (92nd)	Bombshell	Kazu Hiro, Anne Morgan, and Vivian Baker
2019 (92nd)	Joker	Nicki Ledermann and Kay Georgiou
2019 (92nd)	Judy	Jeremy Woodhead
2019 (92nd)	Maleficent: Mistress of Evil	Paul Gooch, Arjen Tuiten, and David White
2019 (92nd)	1917	Naomi Donne, Tristan Versluis, and Rebecca Cole

=== 2020s ===
Year	Film	Nominees
2020/21 (93rd)	Ma Rainey's Black Bottom	Sergio López-Rivera, Mia Neal, and Jamika Wilson
2020/21 (93rd)	Emma	Marese Langan, Laura Allen, and Claudia Stolze
2020/21 (93rd)	Hillbilly Elegy	Eryn Krueger Mekash, Matthew Mungle, and Patricia Dehaney
2020/21 (93rd)	Mank	Gigi Williams, Kimberley Spiteri, and Colleen LaBaff
2020/21 (93rd)	Pinocchio	Mark Coulier, Dalia Colli, and Francesco Pegoretti
2021 (94th)	The Eyes of Tammy Faye	Linda Dowds, Stephanie Ingram, and Justin Raleigh
2021 (94th)	Coming 2 America	Mike Marino, Stacey Morris, and Carla Farmer
2021 (94th)	Cruella	Nadia Stacey, Naomi Donne, and Julia Vernon
2021 (94th)	Dune	Donald Mowat, Love Larson, and Eva von Bahr
2021 (94th)	House of Gucci	Göran Lundström, Anna Carin Lock, and Frederic Aspiras
2022 (95th)	The Whale	Adrien Morot, Judy Chin, and Annemarie Bradley
2022 (95th)	All Quiet on the Western Front	Heike Merker and Linda Eisenhamerová
2022 (95th)	The Batman	Naomi Donne, Mike Marino, and Mike Fontaine
2022 (95th)	Black Panther: Wakanda Forever	Camille Friend and Joel Harlow
2022 (95th)	Elvis	Mark Coulier, Jason Baird, and Aldo Signoretti
2023 (96th)	Poor Things	Nadia Stacey, Mark Coulier, and Josh Weston
2023 (96th)	Golda	Karen Hartley Thomas, Suzi Battersby, and Ashra Kelly-Blue
2023 (96th)	Maestro	Kazu Hiro, Kay Georgiou, and Lori McCoy-Bell
2023 (96th)	Oppenheimer	Luisa Abel
2023 (96th)	Society of the Snow	Ana López-Puigcerver, David Martí, and Montse Ribé
2024 (97th)	The Substance	Pierre-Olivier Persin, Stéphanie Guillon, and Marilyne Scarselli
2024 (97th)	A Different Man	Mike Marino, David Presto, and Crystal Jurado
2024 (97th)	Emilia Pérez	Julia Floch Carbonel, Emmanuel Janvier, and Jean-Christophe Spadaccini
2024 (97th)	Nosferatu	David White, Traci Loader, and Suzanne Stokes-Munton
2024 (97th)	Wicked	Frances Hannon, Laura Blount, and Sarah Nuth
2025 (98th)	Frankenstein	Mike Hill, Jordan Samuel and Cliona Furey
2025 (98th)	Kokuho	Kyoko Toyokawa, Naomi Hibino and Tadashi Nishimatsu
2025 (98th)	Sinners	Ken Diaz, Mike Fontaine and Shunika Terry
2025 (98th)	The Smashing Machine	Kazu Hiro, Glen Griffin and Bjoern Rehbein
2025 (98th)	The Ugly Stepsister	Thomas Foldberg and Anne Cathrine Sauerberg

== Shortlisted finalists ==
Finalists for Best Makeup & Hairstyling are selected by the Makeup & Hairstylists Branch. Ten films are shortlisted. Prior to the 92nd Academy Awards, up to seven films were shortlisted. The full membership of the Makeup & Hairstylists Branch is invited to view excerpts and is provided with supporting information at a "bake-off" where balloting determines the five nominees. These are the additional films that presented at the bake-off.

Year	Finalists
1999	Blast from the Past
2000	Bedazzled, Cast Away
2001	A.I. Artificial Intelligence, Hannibal, Harry Potter and the Sorcerer's Stone, Planet of the Apes
2003	Cold Mountain, The Last Samurai, Monster, Peter Pan
2004	The Aviator, De-Lovely, Harry Potter and the Prisoner of Azkaban, Hellboy
2005	A History of Violence, The Libertine, Mrs Henderson Presents, The New World
2006	Pirates of the Caribbean: Dead Man's Chest, The Prestige, The Santa Clause 3: The Escape Clause, X-Men: The Last Stand
2007	The Diving Bell and the Butterfly, Harry Potter and the Order of the Phoenix, Sweeney Todd: The Demon Barber of Fleet Street, 300
2008	The Reader, Synecdoche, New York, Tropic Thunder, The Wrestler
2009	District 9, The Imaginarium of Doctor Parnassus, Night at the Museum: Battle of the Smithsonian, The Road
2010	Alice in Wonderland, The Fighter, Jonah Hex, True Grit
2011	Anonymous, The Artist, Gainsbourg: A Heroic Life, Hugo
2012	Lincoln, Looper, Men in Black 3, Snow White and the Huntsman
2013	American Hustle, The Great Gatsby, Hansel & Gretel: Witch Hunters, The Hunger Games: Catching Fire
2014	The Amazing Spider-Man 2, Maleficent, Noah, The Theory of Everything
2015	Black Mass, Concussion, Legend, Mr. Holmes
2016	Deadpool, The Dressmaker, Florence Foster Jenkins, Hail, Caesar!
2017	Bright, Ghost in the Shell, Guardians of the Galaxy Vol. 2, I, Tonya
2018	Black Panther, Bohemian Rhapsody, Stan & Ollie, Suspiria
2019	Dolemite Is My Name, Downton Abbey, Little Women, Once Upon a Time in Hollywood, Rocketman
2020	Birds of Prey, The Glorias, Jingle Jangle: A Christmas Journey, The Little Things, One Night in Miami...
2021	Cyrano, Nightmare Alley, No Time to Die, The Suicide Squad, West Side Story
2022	Amsterdam, Babylon, Blonde, Crimes of the Future, Emancipation
2023	Beau Is Afraid, Ferrari, Killers of the Flower Moon, The Last Voyage of the Demeter, Napoleon
2024	The Apprentice, Beetlejuice Beetlejuice, Dune: Part Two, Maria, Waltzing with Brando
2025	The Alto Knights, Marty Supreme, Nuremberg, One Battle After Another, Wicked: For Good

== Multiple awards ==
7 wins

- Rick Baker

4 wins

- Greg Cannom

3 wins

- Mark Coulier
- Ve Neill

2 wins

- David LeRoy Anderson
- Michèle Burke
- Kazu Hiro (formerly known as Kazuhiro Tsuji)
- Yolanda Toussieng
- Richard Taylor

== Multiple nominations ==
11 nominations

- Rick Baker

10 nominations

- Greg Cannom

8 nominations

- Ve Neill

6 nominations

- Michèle Burke
- Kazu Hiro (formerly known as Kazuhiro Tsuji)

5 nominations

- Mark Coulier
- Matthew W. Mungle

4 nominations

- Joel Harlow
- Aldo Signoretti
- Yolanda Toussieng
- Michael Westmore
- Stan Winston

3 nominations

- David LeRoy Anderson
- Bill Corso
- Ken Diaz
- Naomi Donne
- Edouard F. Henriques
- Love Larson
- Mike Marino
- Martin Samuel
- Jenny Shircore
- Eva von Bahr
- Lisa Westcott

2 nominations

- Howard Berger
- Veronica Brebner
- Lois Burwell
- John Caglione Jr.
- Colleen Callaghan
- Judith A. Cory
- Patricia Dehaney
- Dave Elsey
- Paul Engelen
- Mike Fontaine
- Carl Fullerton
- Kay Georgiou
- Bob Laden
- Tami Lane
- Göran Lundström
- David Martí
- Adrien Morot
- Montse Ribé
- Conor O'Sullivan
- Christina Smith
- Dick Smith
- Vittorio Sodano
- Nadia Stacey
- Daniel C. Striepeke
- Peter Swords King
- Richard Taylor
- Arjen Tuiten
- David White

== Age superlatives ==
Record	Makeup artist	Film	Age
Oldest winner	J. Roy Helland	The Iron Lady	69 years, 29 days
Oldest nominee	Gigi Williams	Mank	70–71 years
Youngest winner	Rick Baker	An American Werewolf in London	31 years, 111 days
Youngest nominee	Rob Bottin	Legend	27 years, 316 days

== See also ==
- Saturn Award for Best Make-up
- BAFTA Award for Best Makeup and Hair
- Critics' Choice Movie Award for Best Makeup
- Make-Up Artists and Hair Stylists Guild Award for Best Contemporary Make-Up in a Feature-Length Motion Picture
- Make-Up Artists and Hair Stylists Guild Award for Best Special Make-Up Effects in a Feature-Length Motion Picture
- Make-Up Artists and Hair Stylists Guild Award for Best Contemporary Hair Styling in a Feature-Length Motion Picture
- List of Academy Award–nominated films
