= Yolanda Toussieng =

- Born: 1949 (age 76–77)
- Occupation: makeup artist
- Years active: 1982-Present

Yolanda Toussieng (born 1949) is a two-time Oscar-winning makeup artist. Her first win came at the 1993 Academy Awards for Best Makeup for the film Mrs. Doubtfire, which she shared with Greg Cannom and Ve Neill. The second win was at 1994's 67th Academy Awards for the film Ed Wood, a win she shared with Rick Baker and Ve Neill. She received two more nominations, first during the 2003 Oscars for the film Master and Commander: The Far Side of the World, and her fourth nomination was at the 83rd Academy Awards for the film The Way Back. She also won a Daytime Emmy for Pee-wee's Playhouse in 1988. She has done over 60 films since 1982.
