= Dave Elsey =

English make-up artist (born 1967)

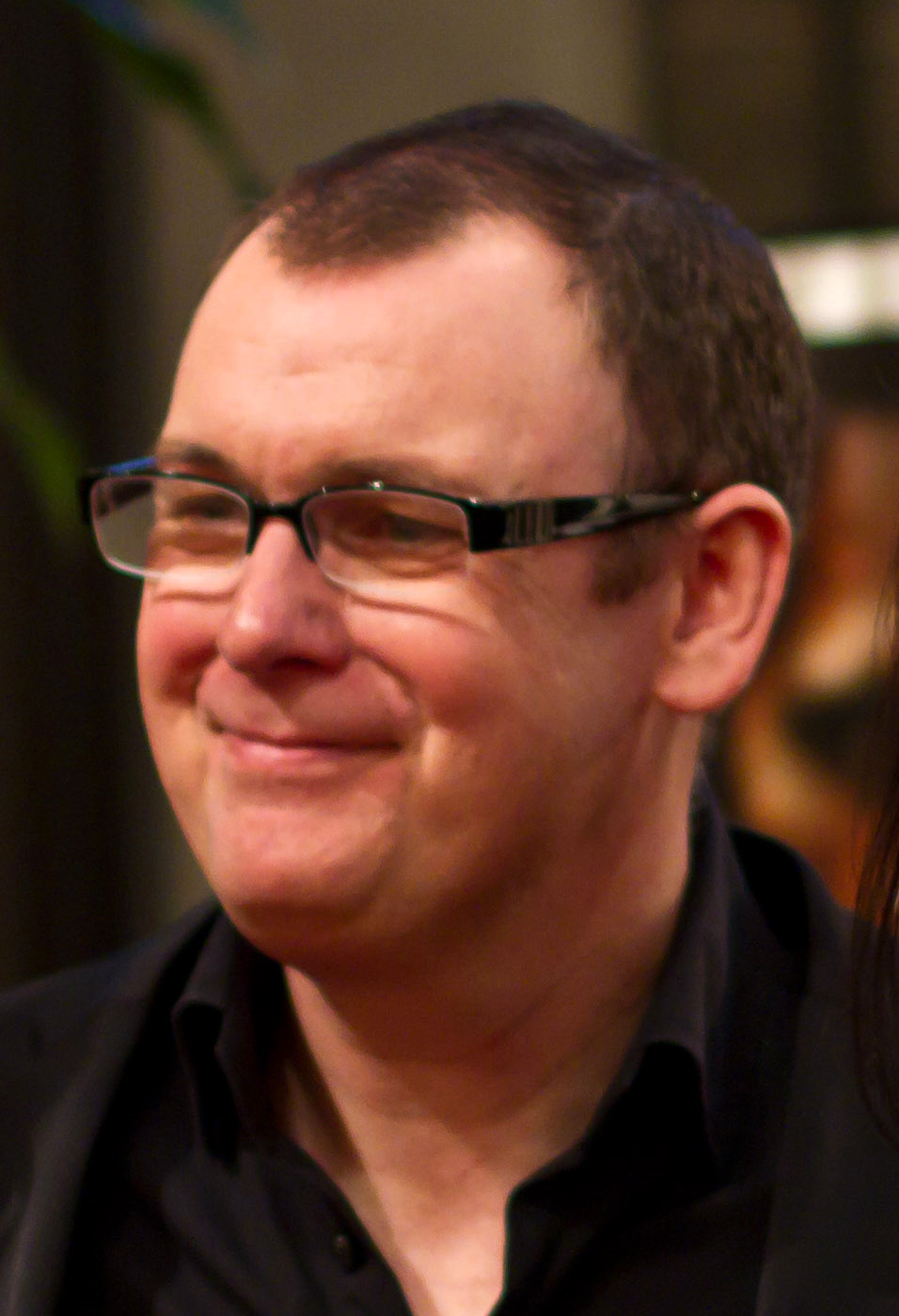
- Elsey in 2011
- Born: David Elsey; February 9, 1967 (age 59); London, England, UK
- Occupations: Make-up effects, creature effects, animatronics
- Years active: 1986–present
- Spouse: Lou Elsey

Dave Elsey (born 9 February 1967) is an English make-up artist known for special make-up effects, creature effects and animatronics in films such as X-Men: First Class, Ghost Rider, Star Wars, Hellraiser, Alien 3, and Indiana Jones . He was born on February 2, 1967, in London, England to Marie and Derek Elsey.

From 1999 to 2011, Elsey lived in Sydney, Australia with his wife Lou while working on the TV science fiction series Farscape.

He currently resides in Los Angeles, California.

== Career ==
=== Star Wars: Episode III ===
Elsey, a huge Star Wars fan as a child, worked on the Star Wars: Episode III – Revenge of the Sith movie in 2005. The work resulted in an Oscar nomination for the creature effects / make-up effects department: a first for that department on a Star Wars film.

=== The Wolfman ===
In 2010, Elsey and Rick Baker collaborated on The Wolfman winning an Academy Award.

=== Industry awards ===
- Saturn Award Nominations: Best Make-up
  - 38th Saturn Awards 2012 - X-Men: First Class, shared with Frank Needham and Conor O'Sullivan. Won.
- Academy Award Nominations: Best Makeup and Hairstyling
  - 83rd Academy Awards - The Wolfman, shared with Rick Baker. Won.
  - 78th Academy Awards - Nominated for Star Wars: Episode III – Revenge of the Sith. Nomination shared with Nikki Gooley. Lost to The Chronicles of Narnia: The Lion, the Witch and the Wardrobe.
- Quantas Film: Achievement in Make-Up Design in Film
  - 2008 Qantas Film and Television Awards: Achievement in Make-Up Design in Film - Black Sheep (2007). Won.

=== Filmography ===
Year	Film	Credit
2017	*"Beauty and the Beast"	Beast Designer & Creature Effects Supervisor
2015	*"Mr. Holmes"	Makeup & Hair Designer for Ian McKellen
2014	*Wolves	Creature Effects Creator/Supervisor
2011	*X-Men: First Class	Beast Make-up Effects
2010	*The Wolfman	Creature Effects Supervisor
2009	*Where the Wild Things Are	Creature Effects Supervisor
2008	*Mutant Chronicles	Creature Effects Supervisor
2007	*Ghost Rider	Make-up Effects Supervisor
2006	*Black Sheep	Creature Effects Supervisor
2005	*Star Wars: Episode III – Revenge of the Sith	Make-up Effects Supervisor
2000	*Mission: Impossible 2	Make-up Effects
1999	*My Life So Far (US: World of Moss)	Make-up Effects Supervisor
1999	*Gregory's Two Girls	Make-up Effects Supervisor
1998	*B. Monkey	Make-up Effects Supervisor
1998	*The Wisdom of Crocodiles	Make-up Effects Supervisor
1997	*The Empire Strikes Back Special Edition	Make-up Effects Supervisor
1997	*Snow White: A Tale of Terror (Snow White in the Black Forest)	Make-up Effects
1997	*Incognito	Make-up Effects/ Animatronics
1997	*The Saint	Make-up Effects
1996	*Mission: Impossible	Make-up Effects
1995	*First Knight	Make-up Effects Supervisor
1995	*The Passion of Darkly Noon	Make-up Effects Supervisor
1995	*Funny Bones	Make-up Effects
1994	*Death machine	Make-up Effects Supervisor
1992	*Hellraiser III: Hell on Earth	Make-up Effects/ Animatronics
1992	*Alien 3	Animatronics
1992	*Candyman	Make-up Effects
1990	*The Witches	Make-up Effects
1989	*Indiana Jones and the Last Crusade	Animatronics
1988	*Waxwork	Make-up Effects
1987	*Hellraiser	Make-up Effects/ Animatronics
1987	*On the black hill	Make-up Effects Supervisor
1986	*Little Shop of Horrors	Animatronics

=== Television ===
- Trading Races Documentary | Make Up Effects Supervisor
- Farscape Seasons 1-4 (88 eps) | Creature Effects Supervisor
- Farscape ‘Peacekeeper Wars’ | Creature Effects Supervisor
- Cold Lazarus | Make Up Effects Supervisor
- How to be a Little Sod | Make Up/ Animatronic Supervisor
- Hunting Venus| Make Up Effects Supervisor
- Prime Suspect 5 | Make Up Effects Supervisor
- Silent Witness 7 | Make Up Effects Supervisor
- The Comic Strip | Make Up Effects Supervisor
- The Hunger | Make Up Effects Supervisor
- The Wanderer | Make Up Effects Supervisor
- The Uninvited | Make Up Effects Supervisor
- Casualty | Make Up Effects Supervisor
