= Christina Smith (make-up artist) =

- Born: May 10, 1945 (age 81); New York, New York
- Occupation: Make-up artist
- Years active: 1972-present

Christina Smith (born May 10, 1945) is an American make-up artist. Since her start in 1972 she has had 79 makeup credits to date.

== Oscar nominations ==
Both nominations were in the category of Best Makeup.

- 1991 Academy Awards-Nominated for Hook, nomination shared with Greg Cannom and Monty Westmore. Lost to Terminator 2: Judgment Day.
- 1993 Academy Awards-Nominated for Schindler's List, nomination shared with Judith A. Cory and Matthew W. Mungle. Lost to Mrs. Doubtfire.

== Selected filmography ==
- Ted (2012)
- Resident Evil: Afterlife (2010)
- Law Abiding Citizen (2009)
- Drillbit Taylor (2008)
- Seraphim Falls (2006)
- The Skeleton Key (2005)
- Sky High (2005)
- Raising Helen (2004)
- Freaky Friday (2003)
- K-19: The Widowmaker (2002)
- Resident Evil (2002)
- Inspector Gadget (1999)
- American History X (1998)
- Small Soldiers (1998)
- The Lost World: Jurassic Park (1997)
- Casper (1995)
- Congo (1995)
- The Flintstones (1994)
- Jurassic Park (1993)
- Schindler's List (1993)
- Hook (1991)
- Steel Magnolias (1989)
- Firefox (1982)
- New York, New York (1977)
