= Bob Laden =

- Born: Robert Laden
- Occupation: makeup artist
- Years active: 1970-1997

Bob Laden (AKA Robert Laden) is a makeup artist who has been nominated twice for Academy Award for Best Makeup and Hairstyling.

== Oscar nominations ==
- 1987 Academy Awards, nominated for Happy New Year. Lost to Harry and the Hendersons.
- 1995 Academy Awards, nominated for Roommates, nomination shared with Colleen Callaghan and Greg Cannom. Lost to Braveheart.

== Selected filmography ==
- Amistad (1997)
- Thinner (1996)
- Roommates (1995)
- Wolf (1994)
- Chaplin (1992)
- Scent of a Woman (1992)
- Happy New Year (1987)
- Prizzi's Honor (1985)
- The Wiz (1978)
