= Colleen Callaghan =

American make-up artist

- Born: 1931
- Died: April 6, 2020 (aged 89); New Jersey, U.S.
- Occupation: Hair stylist
- Years active: 1964-present

Colleen Callaghan (died April 6, 2020) was an Academy Awards-nominated hair stylist who has been nominated twice for Academy Award for Best Makeup and Hairstyling. She worked on over 120 films and TV shows during her long career.

In 2004, she received a lifetime achievement award from the Hollywood Makeup Artist and Hair Stylist Guild Awards. Callaghan died in April 2020.

== Oscar nominations ==
Both were in the category of Academy Award for Best Makeup and Hairstyling.

- 68th Academy Awards, nominated for Roommates. Nomination shared with Greg Cannom and Bob Laden. Lost to Braveheart.
- 74th Academy Awards, nominated for A Beautiful Mind. Nomination shared with Greg Cannom. Lost to The Lord of the Rings: The Fellowship of the Ring.
