= David Presto =

American make-up artist

- Occupation: Make-up artist

David Presto, also known as Dave Presto, is an American make-up artist. He was nominated for an Academy Award in the category Best Makeup and Hairstyling for the film A Different Man.

In addition to his Academy Award nomination, he won a Primetime Emmy Award and was nominated for three more in the category Outstanding Makeup for his work on the television programs Boardwalk Empire, Fosse/Verdon and Pose.

== Selected filmography ==
- A Different Man (2024; co-nominated with Mike Marino and Crystal Jurado)
