= Mike Marino (make-up artist) =

American make-up artist

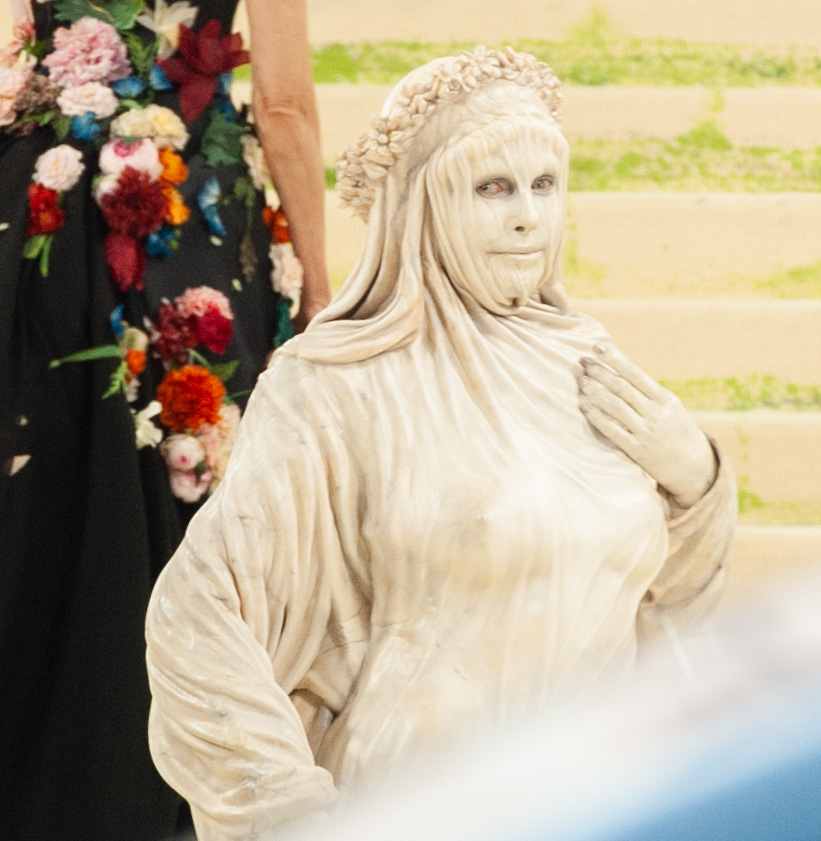
- Marino has collaborated with Heidi Klum for prosthetic work worn at her Halloween parties and her appearance at the 2026 Met Gala (pictured)
- Occupation: Make-up artist
- Years active: 1999–present

Mike Marino is an American make-up artist. He was nominated for three Academy Awards in the category Best Makeup and Hairstyling for the films Coming 2 America, The Batman and A Different Man.

== Selected filmography ==
- Coming 2 America (2021; co-nominated with Stacey Morris and Carla Farmer)
- The Batman (2022; co-nominated with Naomi Donne and Mike Fontaine)
- A Different Man (2024; co-nominated with David Presto and Crystal Jurado)
