= Conor O'Sullivan (make-up artist) =

British prosthetic makeup artist

Conor O'Sullivan is a British prosthetic makeup artist who has been nominated for two Academy Awards. He is perhaps best known for being one of the makeup artists in The Dark Knight who was involved in creating The Joker's makeup.

He was responsible for creating the prosthetics on the first three series of the TV show Game of Thrones.

== Oscar nominations ==
Both of O'Sullivan's nominations were in the category of Best Makeup.

- 71st Academy Awards-Nominated for Saving Private Ryan, nomination shared with Lois Burwell and Daniel C. Striepeke. Lost to Elizabeth.
- 81st Academy Awards—Nominated for The Dark Knight, nomination shared with John Caglione Jr. Lost to The Curious Case of Benjamin Button.

== Selected filmography ==
- Hatching (2022)
- Exodus: Gods and Kings (2014)
- Hercules (2014)
- The Counselor (2013)
- The Dark Knight Rises (2012)
- Prometheus (2012)
- Wrath of the Titans (2012)
- X-Men: First Class (2011)
- Clash of the Titans (2010)
- The Dark Knight (2008)
- Charlie Wilson's War (2007)
- Rescue Dawn (2006)
- The Last Samurai (2003)
- The Hours (2002)
- Captain Corelli's Mandolin (2001)
- Quills (2000)
- Lost in Space (1998)
- Saving Private Ryan (1998)
- Braveheart (1995) (Uncredited)
