= Roommates (1995 film) =

- Promotional poster
- Directed by: Peter Yates
- Screenplay by: Max Apple; Stephen Metcalfe
- Story by: Max Apple
- Produced by: Ted Field; Robert W. Cort; Scott Kroopf
- Starring: Peter Falk; D. B. Sweeney; Julianne Moore; Jan Rubeš; Ellen Burstyn; Courtney Chase
- Cinematography: Mike Southon
- Edited by: Seth Flaum; John Tintori
- Music by: Elmer Bernstein
- Production companies: Hollywood Pictures; Interscope Communications; PolyGram Filmed Entertainment; Nomura Babcock & Brown
- Distributed by: Buena Vista Pictures Distribution
- Release date: March 3, 1995
- Running time: 108 minutes
- Country: United States
- Language: English
- Budget: $22 million
- Box office: $12 million

Roommates is a 1995 American comedy-drama film, starring Peter Falk, D. B. Sweeney, and Julianne Moore, directed by Peter Yates. The original music score was composed by Elmer Bernstein. The film was marketed with the tagline, "Some people talk. Some people listen. When you're 107 and going strong, you do whatever you want."

== Plot ==
In 1963 Pittsburgh, Rocky Holzcek is a cantankerous 77-year-old Polish-American baker who insists, despite relatives' protests, upon adopting his young grandson Michael when the boy's parents die. The other family members are unwilling to take in Michael and say that Rocky is too old, but he insists that "Family takes care of family!" The two live in Rocky's apartment and often play cards. Rocky has a habit of taking a long time to arrange his hand, and this drives Michael crazy. Twenty years later, Michael is a medical intern in Columbus who's forced to take in his still-spry grandfather when the old man is evicted from his apartment building. At a college history class, Rocky explains that the "S" in Harry S Truman's name actually did stand for something, despite what the professor says, because it was a Russian name. Although the crusty, outspoken Rocky gets along with his Chinese college roommates, they play cards together, still with Rocky taking his dear sweet time to arrange his hand, he is less enthused about his grandson's girlfriend, Beth.

Eventually, Michael and Beth marry and head to Pittsburgh where Michael begins his medical residency, while Rocky continues working as a baker. An illness forces Rocky to move back to Pittsburgh with his grandson and his wife, and Rocky warms up to Beth. They play cards, and it seems Beth takes even longer to arrange her hand than Rocky! Seven years pass, and Rocky lives with Michael and Beth and their two children, as Michael has built himself a prominent medical career. However, when Beth is killed in an automobile accident, the old man once again comes to support his grandson in his time of need. Beth's mother wants to take the children, and Michael - initially - agrees. Rocky again lectures Michael on his motto: "Family takes care of family." Michael decides he can't give up the children, and echoes Rocky when he tells Beth's mother "End of discussion!" She backs off and Michael and Rocky take the kids home. At the end of the film, Rocky is in a hospital room, and Michael and the kids come to him to celebrate his 107th birthday. Seeing his EKG growing weak, Michael sends the kids out of the room, and tries to be upbeat for Rocky's sake. He picks up a newspaper and talks about Rocky looking for a new job. Running through the want ads, he pauses after reading one for a Chinese bakery! Turning to Rocky, he asks, "You know anything about this?" A reference to his old college roommates. Rocky smiles, but grows weaker, and Michael finally tells him it's okay, he can go now. Rocky quietly dies knowing that his grandson is well, and that he has provided all the care that he could for him.

== Cast ==
- Peter Falk as Rocky Holzcek
- D. B. Sweeney as Michael Holzcek
- Julianne Moore as Beth Holzcek
- Ellen Burstyn as Judith Matthews
- Jan Rubeš as Bolek Krupa
- Ernie Sabella as Stash
- John Cunningham as Burt Shook
- Frankie Faison as Professor Martin
- Courtney Chase as Lisa
- William H. Macy as Doctor (uncredited cameo)
- Mengze Shi as Fan

== Filming details ==
It was filmed in and around Pittsburgh, Pennsylvania, including in the Cathedral of Learning at the University of Pittsburgh. Several scenes were filmed on the campus of Washington & Jefferson College in Washington, Pennsylvania, including scenes near the Admissions House, the Dieter-Porter Life Science Building, and Old Main.

The aging of Rocky (the Peter Falk character) through creative make-up earned the picture an Academy Award nomination.

== Reception ==
Roommates received negative reviews from critics. On the review aggregator website Rotten Tomatoes, 31% of 13 critics' reviews are positive. Audiences surveyed by CinemaScore gave the film a grade "A" on scale of A+ to F.

Roger Ebert of the Chicago Sun-Times gave the film two and a half out of four stars and wrote, "The pieces were in place for a nice little story, but by trying to do too much with it, Roommates overshoots the runway."

=== Accolades ===
The film was nominated for the Best Make-Up Oscar (Greg Cannom, Bob Laden, Colleen Callaghan), and was nominated for the Best Young Actress Award, Young Artist Awards (Courtney Chase).
