= Lance Anderson =

American makeup artist

- Occupation: Makeup artist
- Years active: 1982–present
- Children: David LeRoy Anderson
- Website: http://www.oilpaintingsbylance.com/

Lance Anderson is an American makeup artist who was nominated at the 78th Academy Awards in the category of Best Makeup. He shared his nomination with his son, David LeRoy Anderson, for their work on the film Cinderella Man.

== Personal life ==
Anderson now lives in California, where he is an oil painter of pulp style pictures.

He went to the Stan Winston School and is the cofounder of AFX Studio.
