= Heike Merker =

German hairstylist and make-up artist

- Occupation(s): Hairstylist, make-up artist

Heike Merker is a German hairstylist and make-up artist. She was nominated for an Academy Award in the category Best Makeup and Hairstyling for the film All Quiet on the Western Front.

== Selected filmography ==
- All Quiet on the Western Front (2022; co-nominated with Linda Eisenhamerová)
