= Jean-Christophe Spadaccini =

French make-up artist

- Occupation: Make-up artist

Jean-Christophe Spadaccini is a French make-up artist. He was nominated for an Academy Award in the category Best Makeup and Hairstyling for the film Emilia Pérez.

== Selected filmography ==
- Emilia Pérez (2024; co-nominated with Julia Floch Carbonel and Emmanuel Janvier)
