= Norman Leavitt =

American film and television actor (1913–2005)

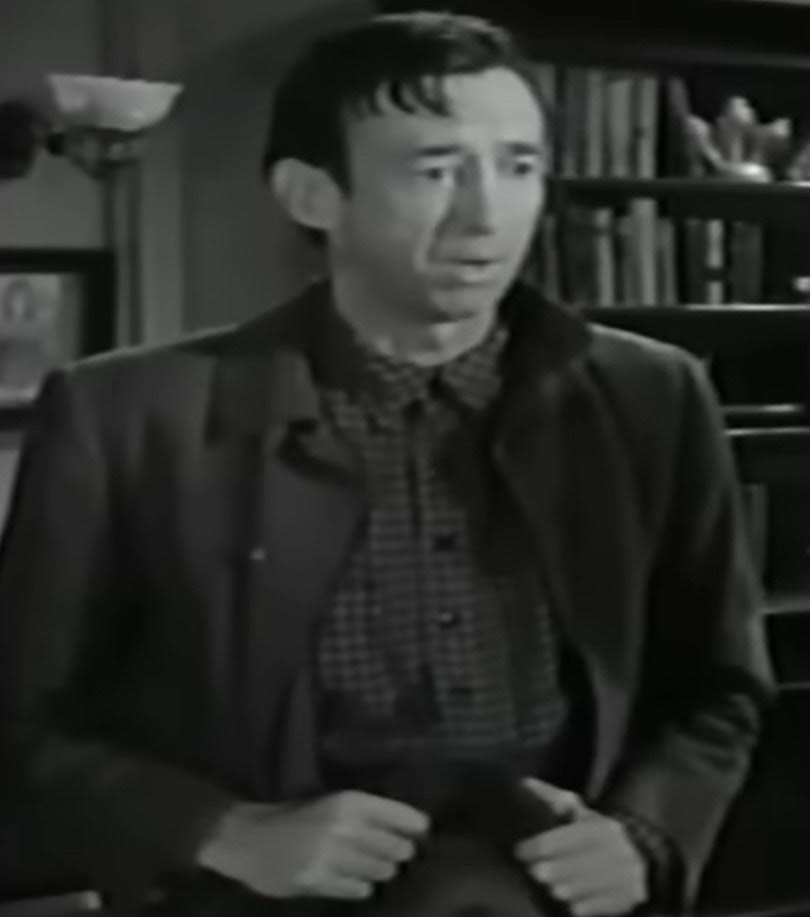
- Leavitt in an episode of One Step Beyond (1960)
- Born: Norman Turner Leavitt; December 1, 1913; Lansing, Michigan, U.S.
- Died: December 11, 2005 (aged 92); Solvang, California, U.S.
- Occupations: Film and television actor
- Years active: 1935–1978
- Spouse(s): Margaret Anna Haldin (m. 19??; died 1992)
- Children: Norman T. Leavitt

Norman Turner Leavitt (December 1, 1913 – December 11, 2005) was an American film and television actor. He was best known for playing the recurring role of dimwitted jail handyman Ralph in the American western television series Trackdown.

== Life and career ==
Leavitt was born in Lansing, Michigan. He began his stage career in 1935, appearing as a wedding guest in the Broadway play How Beautiful With Shoes. He then began his screen career in 1946, appearing in the film The Harvey Girls. During his screen career, he mainly appeared in films in uncredited and supporting roles.

Later in his career, Leavitt appeared in numerous films such as It's a Dog's Life, The Long, Long Trailer, Stars and Stripes Forever, Somebody Loves Me, The Merry Widow, Hannah Lee: An American Primitive, O. Henry's Full House, California Passage, Mr. Belvedere Rings the Bell, Harvey, The Killer That Stalked New York, Wabash Avenue, The Inspector General, A Woman of Distinction, Off Limits, The Luck of the Irish, Showdown at Boot Hill, God Is My Partner, Valerie, The Way to the Gold, The Shadow on the Window, The Ten Commandments, Fury at Gunsight Pass, Ride, Vaquero!, Living It Up, The Kentuckian and When Gangland Strikes, Combat Squad, The Rookie, and Teenage Monster.

Leavitt made his television debut in 1952, appearing in the syndicated western television series The Adventures of Kit Carson. From 1958 to 1960, he played the recurring role of the dimwitted jail handyman Ralph in the western television series Trackdown. He guest-starred in numerous television programs and fewer films. His television credits included Gunsmoke, The Twilight Zone, Mayberry, R.F.D., Perry Mason, The Fugitive, The Beverly Hillbillies, Petticoat Junction, Green Acres, The Man from U.N.C.L.E., Bonanza, Lost in Space, The Wild Wild West, The Jack Benny Program, Mister Ed, Death Valley Days, The Rifleman, Leave It to Beaver, Peter Gunn, The Addams Family, Wagon Train, Tales of Wells Fargo, The Millionaire, The Guns of Will Sonnett and Ironside. He also appeared in the CBS sitcom television series The Andy Griffith Show, playing a number of different roles.

Leavitt retired from acting in 1978, last appearing in the television series Quincy, M.E..

== Death ==
Leavitt died on December 11, 2005 of dehydration and dementia at the Motion Picture and Television Hospital in Solvang, California, at the age of 92. His body was cremated.
