= JFK (soundtrack) =

JFK (Music from the Original Motion Picture Soundtrack)

Soundtrack album by John Williams
- Released: January 21, 1992
- Recorded: 1991
- Genre: Soundtrack, classical
- Label: Elektra

John Williams chronology
Hook (1991)	JFK (Music from the Original Motion Picture Soundtrack) (1992)	Far and Away (1992)

Professional ratings
Review scores
Source	Rating
AllMusic	3/5 stars
Filmtracks	2/5 stars

JFK is the original soundtrack of the 1991 Academy Award and Golden Globe Award–winning film of the same name, starring Kevin Costner, Tommy Lee Jones, Kevin Bacon, Joe Pesci, and Sissy Spacek. The original score was composed and conducted by John Williams.

The album was nominated for the Academy Award for Best Original Score.

Although the source music received generally mixed reviews, Williams's score was met with critical acclaim.

== Track listing ==
All tracks written by John Williams, except where noted.

No.	Title	Performer(s)	Length
1.	"Prologue"
2.	"The Motorcade"
3.	"Drummers' Salute"	Royal Scots Dragoon Guards
4.	"Theme from JFK"
5.	"Eternal Father, Strong to Save" (John Bacchus Dykes)
6.	"Garrison's Obsession"
7.	"On the Sunny Side of the Street" (Dorothy Fields (lyrics), Jimmy McHugh (music))	Sidney Bechet
8.	"The Conspirators"
9.	"The Death of David Ferrie"
10.	"Maybe September" (Ray Evans, Percy Faith, Jay Livingston)	Tony Bennett and Bill Evans
11.	"Garrison Family Theme"
12.	"Ode to Buckwheat" (Brent Lewis)	Brent Lewis
13.	"El Watusi" (Ray Barretto)	Ray Barretto
14.	"The Witnesses"
15.	"Concerto #2 For Horn and Orchestra, K. 417: 1 Allegro Maestoso" (Wolfgang Amadeus Mozart)	Franz Liszt Chamber Orchestra
16.	"Arlington"
17.	"Finale"
18.	"Theme from JFK (Reprise)"
