= Linda Eisenhamerová =

Czech hairstylist and make-up artist

- Occupation(s): Hairstylist, make-up artist
- Years active: 1998–present

Linda Eisenhamerová is a Czech hairstylist and make-up artist. She was nominated for an Academy Award in the category Best Makeup and Hairstyling for the film All Quiet on the Western Front.

== Selected filmography ==
- All Quiet on the Western Front (2022; co-nominated with Heike Merker)
