= Emmanuel Janvier =

French hairstylist

- Occupation: Hairstylist

Emmanuel Janvier is a French hairstylist. He was nominated for an Academy Award in the category Best Makeup and Hairstyling for the film Emilia Pérez.

== Selected filmography ==
- Emilia Pérez (2024; co-nominated with Julia Floch Carbonel and Jean-Christophe Spadaccini)
