= Crystal Jurado =

American make-up artist

- Occupation: Make-up artist

Crystal Jurado is an American make-up artist. She was nominated for an Academy Award in the category Best Makeup and Hairstyling for the film A Different Man.

== Selected filmography ==
- A Different Man (2024; co-nominated with Mike Marino and David Presto)
