= David LeRoy Anderson =

American makeup artist

- Occupation: Makeup artist
- Years active: 1986–present
- Spouse: Heather Langenkamp (m. 1989)
- Children: 2
- Parent: Lance Anderson (father)

David LeRoy Anderson is an American makeup artist for films and television. He won two Academy Awards for Best Makeup: first was at the 69th Academy Awards for the film The Nutty Professor, then again the following year at the 70th Academy Awards for Men in Black. Both wins were shared with Rick Baker.

He received his third Oscar nomination at the 2005 ceremony for the film Cinderella Man, a nomination he shared with his father, Lance Anderson.

== Personal life ==
David LeRoy Anderson is married to actress Heather Langenkamp, best known as the heroine in A Nightmare on Elm Street. They own a visual effects company named AFX Studio. Charlie Sheen is a childhood friend of Anderson, and was best man at Anderson's wedding to Langenkamp.

They have two children, Daniel Atticus and Isabelle Eve. On January 10, 2018, Daniel died at age 26 from brain cancer.
