= Julia Floch Carbonel =

French make-up artist

- Occupation: Make-up artist

Julia Floch Carbonel is a French make-up artist. She was nominated for an Academy Award in the category Best Makeup and Hairstyling for the film Emilia Pérez.

== Selected filmography ==
- Emilia Pérez (2024; co-nominated with Emmanuel Janvier and Jean-Christophe Spadaccini)
