= Hallie D'Amore =

American make-up artist (1942–2006)

- Born: August 13, 1942; Harvey, Illinois, USA
- Died: December 14, 2006 (aged 64) (Suicide); Los Angeles, California, USA
- Occupation: Make-up artist
- Years active: 1985-2007 (Last 2 films released posthumously)
- Spouse: Richard D'Amore (November 1984 - 14 December 2006)
- Children: 2

Hallie D'Amore (August 13, 1942 – December 14, 2006) was an American make-up artist who was nominated for Forrest Gump at the 1994 Academy Awards for Best Makeup. She shared her nomination with Judith A. Cory and Daniel C. Striepeke.

== Death ==
Hallie D'Amore killed her husband and herself on December 14, 2006.

== Selected filmography ==
- Steel Magnolias (1989)
- Bugsy (1991)
- Forrest Gump (1994)
- Apollo 13 (1995)
- Galaxy Quest (1999)
- The Princess Diaries (2001)
- We Were Soldiers (2002)
- 2 Fast 2 Furious (2003)
- The Princess Diaries 2: Royal Engagement (2004)
- Christmas with the Kranks (2004)
- The Santa Clause 3: The Escape Clause (2006)
- The Shaggy Dog (2006)
- Captivity (2007-released posthumously
- Wild Hogs (2007-released posthumously)
