= Zoltan Elek =

American makeup artist

- Born: September 6, 1941 (age 85); Hungary
- Died: September 13, 2026 (age 85); Los Angeles, California
- Other name: Zoltan
- Occupation: makeup artist
- Years active: 1967–2009

Zoltan Elek (born September 6, 1941) is a Hungarian makeup artist who won the 1985 Academy Award for Best Makeup for the film Mask, shared with colleague Michael Westmore. He also was the creator for the makeup of Max Headroom.

== Selected filmography ==
- Fast & Furious (2009)
- Live Free or Die Hard (2007)
- The Black Dahlia (2006)
- The Terminal (2004)
- Star Trek: Nemesis (2002)
- Dr. Seuss' How the Grinch Stole Christmas (2000)
- Rules of Engagement (2000)
- Fight Club (1999)
- Independence Day (1996) (As Zoltan)
- Street Fighter (1994) (as Zoltan)
- Hard Target (1993) (as Zoltan)
- The Fisher King (1991)
- Indiana Jones and the Last Crusade (1989)
- Alien Nation (1988) (as Zoltan)
- Mask (1985) (as Zoltan)
