= Daniel C. Striepeke =

American makeup artist (1930–2019)

- Born: Daniel Charles Striepeke; October 8, 1930; Sonoma County, California
- Died: January 17, 2019 (aged 88)
- Occupation: Make-up artist
- Years active: 1956–2006

Daniel Charles Striepeke (October 8, 1930 – January 17, 2019) was an American makeup artist who was nominated for two Academy Awards and who has often done make-up on Tom Hanks films. With a 40-year career he did makeup on over 100 films. He received the Lifetime Achievement Award at the Hollywood Makeup Artist and Hair Stylist Guild Awards in 2004. He also worked on TV shows such as Lost in Space.

== Oscar nominations ==
Both nominations were in the category of Best Makeup.

- 1994 Academy Awards-Nominated for Forrest Gump, nomination shared with Judith A. Cory and Hallie D'Amore. Lost to Ed Wood.
- 1998 Academy Awards-Nominated for Saving Private Ryan, nomination shared with Lois Burwell and Conor O'Sullivan. Lost to Elizabeth.

== Selected filmography ==
- The Terminal (2004)
- Road to Perdition (2002)
- Cast Away (2000)
- The Green Mile (1999)
- Saving Private Ryan (1998)
- Apollo 13 (1995)
- Forrest Gump (1994)
- The 'Burbs (1989)
- My Stepmother Is an Alien (1988)
- Harry and the Hendersons (1987)
- Silverado (1985)
- Annie (1982)
- The Jazz Singer (1980)
- The Deer Hunter (1978)
- Sssssss (1973-writer and producer as well)
- Conquest of the Planet of the Apes (1972)
- Escape from the Planet of the Apes (1971)
- Beneath the Planet of the Apes (1970)
- Patton (1970)
- Tora! Tora! Tora! (1970)
- Butch Cassidy and the Sundance Kid (1969)
- Planet of the Apes (1968)
- The Magic Sword (1962)
- The Magnificent Seven (1960)
- Around the World in 80 Days (1956)
