= Keith VanderLaan =

- Occupation: Make-up artist

Keith VanderLaan is a make-up artist.

He was previously a Feature Film Creative Director, integrating visual effects, character effects, makeup effects, specialty effects, and physical effects. He was nominated for an Academy Award for Best Makeup for his work in The Passion of the Christ (2004) at the 77th Academy Awards. He shared his nomination with Christien Tinsley.

In addition he has won an Emmy Award for Outstanding Makeup for a Series (Non-Prosthetic).
