= Michèle Burke =

Irish-born make-up artist (1949–2025)

- Born: 29 December 1949; Kildare, County Kildare, Ireland
- Died: 26 September 2025 (aged 75); Los Angeles, California, U.S.
- Occupation: Make-up artist
- Years active: 1980–2025
- Website: micheleburke.com

Michèle Burke (29 December 1949 – 26 September 2025) was an Irish-born Academy Award-winning make-up artist.

== Life and career ==
Burke emigrated to Canada with her brother Mark in 1973, and first worked as a model in Montreal before becoming a makeup artist.

She held both Canadian and U.S. citizenship, in addition to her original Irish nationality. Burke died on 26 September 2025, at the age of 75.

== Honours and awards ==
Burke won numerous awards, including two Academy Awards for Best Makeup, the first time for Quest for Fire (1981) – whereby she was also the first female to win an Oscar in this category – and the second time for Bram Stoker's Dracula (1992).
