= Ken Chase (make-up artist) =

American make-up artist

- Born: 1942 (age 83–84); Los Angeles, California, USA
- Other name: Kenneth Chase
- Occupation: makeup artist
- Years active: 1968-2001

Ken Chase (born 1942) is an American make-up artist who has worked on both television and films. He was nominated at the 58th Academy Awards in the category of Best Makeup, for his work on the film The Color Purple.

He worked on 80 different films and TV shows from 1968 to 2001.

== Selected filmography ==
- Planet of the Apes (1968)
- Jeremiah Johnson (1972)
- Escape from New York (1981)
- The Thing (1982)
- The Toy (1982)
- Smokey and the Bandit Part 3 (1983)
- Back to the Future (1985)
- The Color Purple (1985)
- The Golden Child (1986)
- Big Trouble in Little China (1986)
- Who Framed Roger Rabbit (1988)
- Back to the Future Part II (1989)
- When Harry Met Sally... (1989)
- Kindergarten Cop (1990)
- City Slickers (1991)
- Beethoven's 2nd (1993)
- Mr. Holland's Opus (1995)
- Nutty Professor II: The Klumps (2000)
- Evolution (2001)
