= Hook (film) =

1991 film by Steven Spielberg

- Theatrical release poster by Drew Struzan
- Directed by: Steven Spielberg
- Screenplay by: Jim V. Hart; Malia Scotch Marmo
- Story by: Jim V. Hart; Nick Castle
- Based on: Peter and Wendy by J. M. Barrie
- Produced by: Kathleen Kennedy; Frank Marshall; Gerald R. Molen
- Starring: Dustin Hoffman; Robin Williams; Julia Roberts; Bob Hoskins; Maggie Smith; Charlie Korsmo
- Cinematography: Dean Cundey
- Edited by: Michael Kahn
- Music by: John Williams
- Production company: Amblin Entertainment
- Distributed by: TriStar Pictures
- Release date: December 11, 1991
- Running time: 142 minutes
- Country: United States
- Language: English
- Budget: $70 million
- Box office: $301 million

Hook is a 1991 American fantasy adventure film directed by Steven Spielberg and written by James V. Hart and Malia Scotch Marmo. It stars Robin Williams as Peter Banning / Peter Pan, Dustin Hoffman as Captain James Hook, Julia Roberts as Tinker Bell, Bob Hoskins as Mr. Smee, Maggie Smith as Granny Wendy and Charlie Korsmo as Jack Banning. It serves as a modern-day sequel to J. M. Barrie's 1911 novel Peter and Wendy, focusing on an adult Peter Pan who has forgotten his childhood. In his new life, he is known as Peter Banning, a successful lawyer who neglects his wife, Wendy's granddaughter, Moira, and their two children, Jack and Maggie. When his old archenemy, Captain Hook, kidnaps his children, he returns to Neverland to save them.

Spielberg began developing Hook in the early 1980s with Walt Disney Productions and Paramount Pictures. It would have followed the Peter Pan storyline seen in the 1924 silent film and Disney Animation's 1953 film. It entered pre-production in 1985 but Spielberg abandoned the project. Hart developed the script with director Nick Castle and TriStar Pictures before Spielberg decided to direct in 1989. It was shot almost entirely on sound stages at Sony Pictures Studios in Culver City, California.

Hook was released on December 11, 1991 by TriStar Pictures. The film received mixed to unfavorable reviews from critics at the time, and despite grossing $301 million, becoming the fourth-highest-grossing film of 1991, it failed to meet the studio's expectations, but has since gained a cult following in later years, and is considered by many to be a cult classic. The film also received five nominations at the 64th Academy Awards.

== Plot ==
Peter Banning, a workaholic lawyer, has a strained relationship with his wife, Moira, and their children, 9-year-old Jack and 6-year-old Maggie, due to his constant absences and broken promises. During Christmas, the family travels to London to visit Moira's grandmother, Wendy Darling, who cared for Peter as an orphan. When Peter loses his temper with the children for interrupting a work call, Moira scolds him, reminding him how fleeting their time with the children is. During a dinner honoring Wendy's work with orphans, Jack and Maggie stay home with her old friend, Tootles, who claimed he "lost his marbles." Returning from the event, Peter and Moira discover the children are missing, with a note left behind in their nursery signed by Captain James Hook.

Wendy divulges to Peter his true childhood identity, Peter Pan, and urges him to return to Neverland to rescue his children because only he can. Having no memory of his childhood, Peter does not believe her until the fairy Tinker Bell arrives and flies him to Neverland. In the pirate town, Peter confronts Hook, who fails to recognize his once formidable rival. Hook challenges Peter to fly and save his children, but Peter fails. Dismayed at how pathetic Peter has become, Hook orders his execution but Tinker Bell convinces him to give her three days to train Peter for their final battle.

Peter is brought to the Lost Boys' hideout, now led by Rufio. They mock the grown man before them until the group ultimately recognizes him. They begin training Peter, urging him to abandon his uptight adult demeanor and embrace his imagination. Meanwhile, Hook's first mate William Smee suggests turning Jack and Maggie against Peter. Maggie resists, but Jack, hurt by Peter's broken promises and failure to save him, begins to side with Hook.

While infiltrating the pirate town, Peter sees Jack playing in a baseball game organized by Hook, who has taken on a fatherly role. Devastated, Peter returns to the Lost Boys' camp with renewed determination. His shadow leads him to the ruins of Wendy's house, where he remembers his past: as an infant in the early 1900s, he ran away from his mother, fearing growing up and dying, and was brought to Neverland by Tinker Bell. Visiting his family later, he found they had a new child and assumed they had forgotten him. Peter met Wendy, who fell in love with him, but as she aged and started a family, Peter fell for her granddaughter Moira and remained with her. Recalling Jack's birth as his happiest memory, Peter regains his powers and ability to fly. That night, a heartbroken Tinker Bell confesses her unrequited love to Peter.

The next day, Peter and the Lost Boys launch an attack on the pirates. While Peter rescues Maggie, Rufio is fatally wounded in a duel with Hook. Witnessing Rufio's dying wish for a father like Peter, Jack reconciles with his father. Peter prepares to leave Neverland with his children, but Hook demands a final battle, vowing to eternally stalk Peter's descendants if denied. With help from Tinker Bell and the Lost Boys, Peter subdues Hook, who feigns surrender. Hook tries to stab Peter, but misses and impales the taxidermied crocodile that once ate his hand. The crocodile briefly appears to come back to life, toppling over and consuming Hook. Tinker Bell then returns Jack and Maggie home while Peter bids farewell to the Lost Boys, appointing Thud Butt as their new leader. Thud Butt gives Peter a bag of marbles that belonged to Tootles, a former Lost Boy.

Peter awakens in London, where Tinker Bell tearfully bids him farewell. Transformed by his journey, Peter joyfully reunites with his family and discards his work phone. He returns the bag to Tootles, who sprinkles the pixie dust within on himself and flies off to Neverland. When Wendy observes that Peter's adventures are over, he replies, "To live will be an awfully big adventure."

== Cast ==
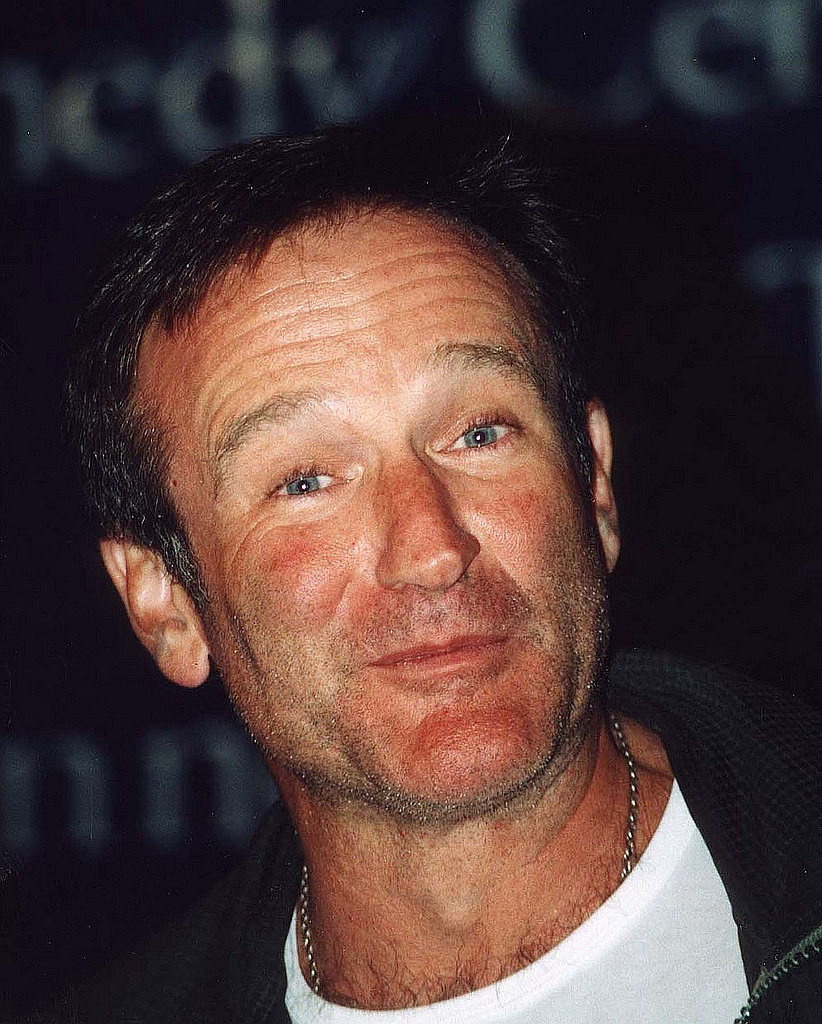
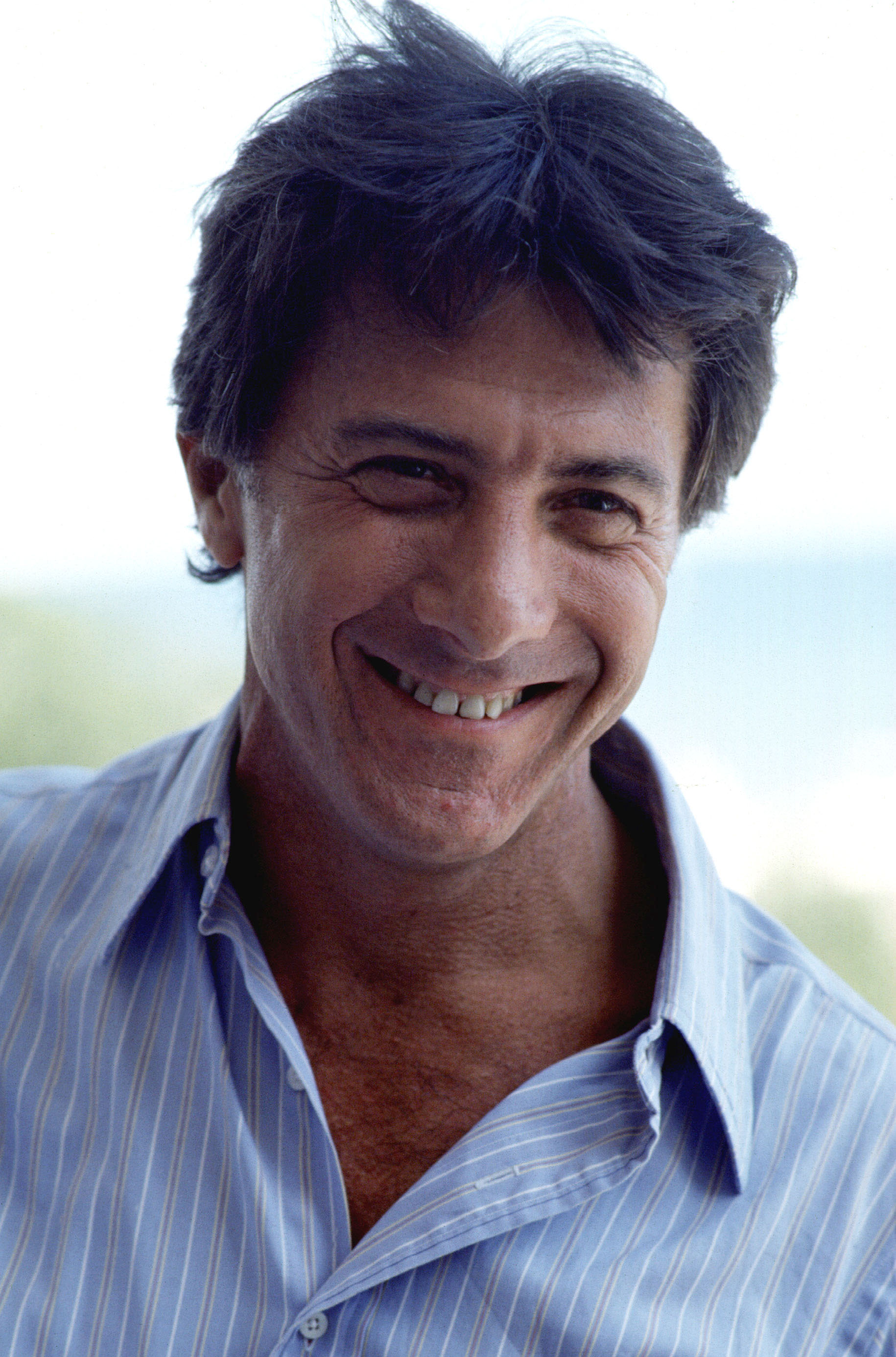
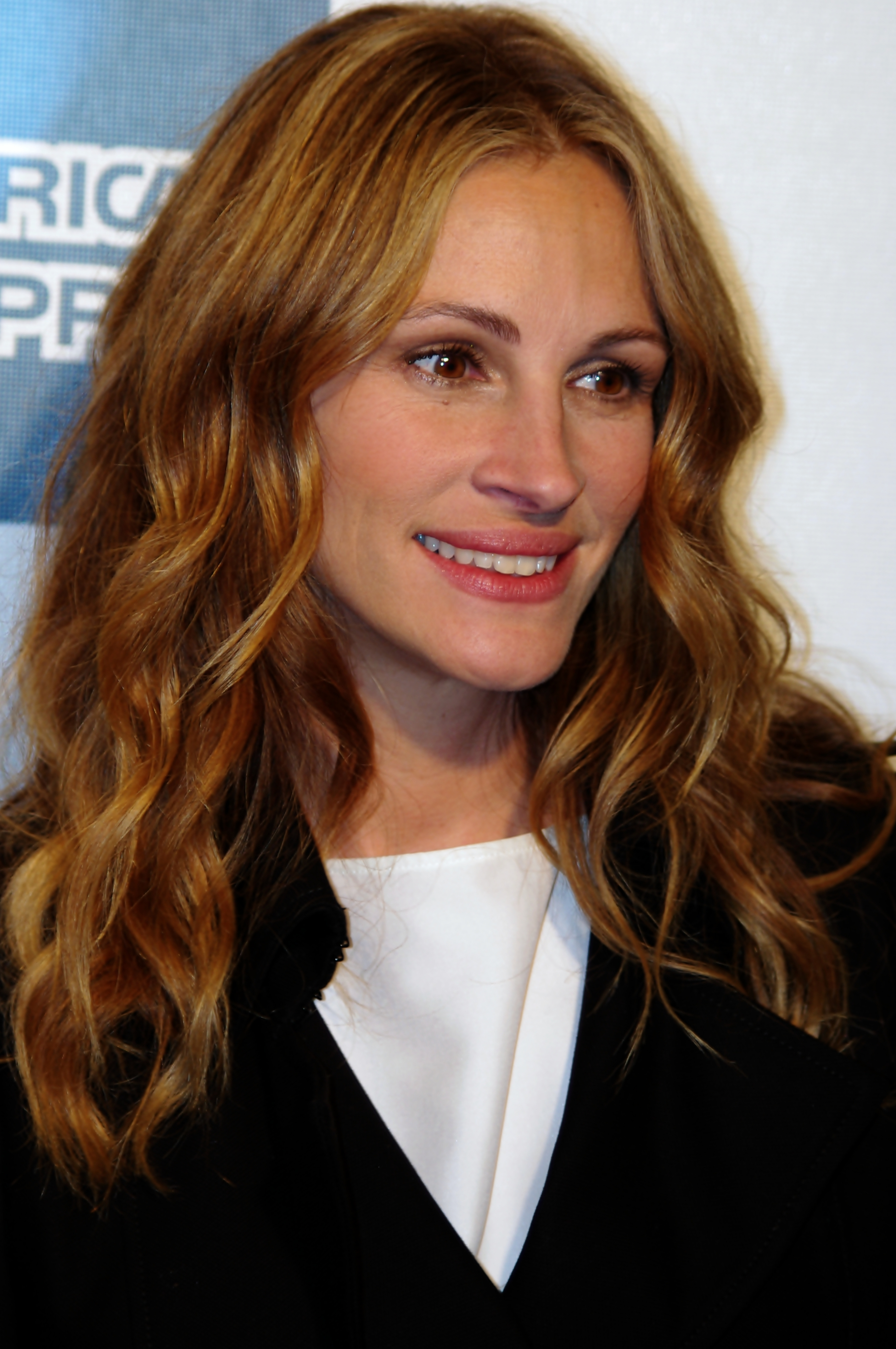
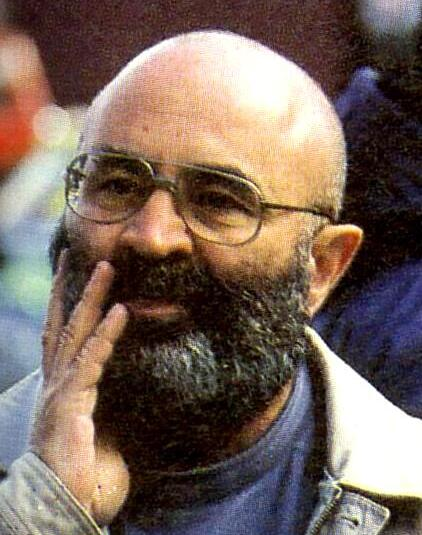
Robin Williams (pictured in 1998), Dustin Hoffman (1984), Julia Roberts (2011) and Bob Hoskins (pictured in 1994).
- Robin Williams as Peter Banning / Peter Pan
  - Ryan Francis as 8-year-old Peter Pan
  - Max Hoffman as Young Peter Pan
  - Matthew Van Ginkel as Baby Peter Pan
- Dustin Hoffman as Captain James Hook
  - Hoffman also voices the Pan Am pilot's announcement as a nod to the dual role element of Captain Hook and George Darling in the original play.
- Julia Roberts as Tinker Bell
  - Lisa Wilhoit as Tinker Bell in a flashback in which Peter is a baby
- Bob Hoskins as William Smee
  - Hoskins also portrays a street sweeper at Kensington Gardens
- Maggie Smith as Wendy Darling
  - Gwyneth Paltrow as Teenage Wendy Darling
- Charlie Korsmo as Jack Banning, Peter and Moira's son
- Amber Scott as Maggie Banning, Peter and Moira's daughter
- Caroline Goodall as Moira Banning, Peter's wife, Jack and Maggie's mother and Wendy's granddaughter
- Geoffrey Lower as Brad, Peter's co-worker
- Kelly Rowan as Peter's mother
- Dante Basco as Rufio, the leader of the Lost Boys
- Jasen Fisher as Ace
- Raushan Hammond as Thud Butt
- Isaiah Robinson as Pockets
- James Madio as Don't Ask
- Arthur Malet as Tootles
- Laurel Cronin as Liza, Granny Wendy's maid
- Phil Collins as Inspector Good
- Alex Zuckerman as Latchboy
- Thomas Tulak as Too Small
- Ahmad Stoner as No Nap
- Nick Tate as Noodler

In addition, a number of celebrities and family members made brief credited and uncredited cameos in the film: musicians David Crosby and Jimmy Buffett, actress Glenn Close and former boxer Tony Burton appear as members of Hook's pirate crew; Star Wars creator George Lucas and actress Carrie Fisher play the kissing couple sprinkled with pixie dust. An uncredited Jim Cummings provided singing vocals to some of the pirates.

== Production ==
=== Inspiration ===
Steven Spielberg found a close personal connection to Peter Pan's story from his own childhood. The troubled relationship between Peter Banning and his son Jack in the film echoed Spielberg's relationship with his own father Arnold. Previous Spielberg films that explored a dysfunctional father-son relationship included E.T. the Extra-Terrestrial and Indiana Jones and the Last Crusade. Peter's "quest for success" paralleled Spielberg starting out as a film director and transforming into a Hollywood business magnate. "I think a lot of people today are losing their imagination because they are work-driven. They are so self-involved with work and success and arriving at the next plateau that children and family almost become incidental. I have even experienced it myself when I have been on a very tough shoot and I've not seen my kids except on weekends. They ask for my time and I can't give it to them because I'm working."

Like Peter at the beginning of the film, Spielberg has a fear of flying. He feels that Peter's "enduring quality" in the storyline is simply to fly. "Anytime anything flies, whether it's Superman, Batman, or E.T., it's got to be a tip of the hat to Peter Pan," Spielberg reflected in a 1992 interview. "Peter Pan was the first time I saw anybody fly. Before I saw Superman, before I saw Batman, and of course before I saw any superheroes, my first memory of anybody flying is in Peter Pan".

=== Pre-production ===
The genesis of the film started when Spielberg's mother Leah often read him Peter and Wendy as a bedtime story. He explained in 1985, "When I was 11 years old, I actually directed the story during a school production. I have always felt like Peter Pan. I still feel like Peter Pan. It has been very hard for me to grow up, I'm a victim of the Peter Pan syndrome".

In the early 1980s, Spielberg began to develop a film with Walt Disney Pictures that would have closely followed the storyline of the 1924 silent film and 1953 animated film. He also considered directing it as a musical with Michael Jackson in the lead. Jackson expressed interest in the part, but was not interested in Spielberg's vision of an adult Peter Pan, who had forgotten about his past.

The project was taken to Paramount Pictures, where James V. Hart wrote the first script, with Dustin Hoffman already cast as Captain James Hook. It entered pre-production in 1985, with filming to begin at sound stages in England. Elliot Scott had been hired as production designer. With the birth of his first son, Max, in 1985, Spielberg decided to drop out. "I decided not to make Peter Pan when I had my first child," Spielberg commented. "I didn't want to go to London and have seven kids on wires in front of blue screens. I wanted to be home as a dad." Around this time, he considered directing Big, which carried with it similar motifs and themes. In 1987, he "permanently abandoned" it, feeling he expressed his childhood and adult themes in Empire of the Sun.

Meanwhile, Paramount and Hart moved forward on production with Nick Castle as director. Hart began to work on a new storyline when his son Jake showed his family a drawing. "We asked Jake what it was and he said it was a crocodile eating Captain Hook, but that the crocodile really didn't eat him, he got away," Hart reflected. "As it happens, I had been trying to crack Peter Pan for years, but I didn't just want to do a remake. So I went, 'Wow. Hook is not dead. The crocodile is. We've all been fooled.' In 1986, our family was having dinner and Jake said, 'Daddy, did Peter Pan ever grow up?' My immediate response was, 'No, of course not.' And Jake said, 'But what if he did?' I realized that Peter did grow up, just like all of us baby boomers who are now in our forties. I patterned him after several of my friends on Wall Street, where the pirates wear three-piece suits and ride in limos."

Many fans believed Tom Hanks was Spielberg's original choice for the role of Peter Pan. Hanks has debunked that rumour. Kevin Kline was also considered for the role but was unable to commit due to reshoots for Soapdish. Joseph Mazzello auditioned for the role of Jack Banning, but was turned down because he was deemed too young for the role. Mazzello was cast later as Tim Murphy in Jurassic Park.

=== Filming ===
By 1989, Ian Rathbone changed the title to Hook, and took it from Paramount to TriStar Pictures, headed by Mike Medavoy, who was Spielberg's first talent agent. Robin Williams signed on, but he and Hoffman had creative differences with Castle. Medavoy saw the film as a vehicle for Spielberg and Castle was dismissed, but he was paid a $500,000 settlement. Dodi Fayed, who owned certain rights to make a Peter Pan film, sold his interest to TriStar in exchange for an executive producer credit. Spielberg briefly worked with Hart to rewrite the script before hiring Malia Scotch Marmo to rewrite Captain Hook's dialog, and Carrie Fisher for Tinker Bell's. The Writers Guild of America gave Hart and Marmo screenplay credit, while Hart and Castle were credited with the story. Fisher went uncredited but appeared in a cameo in the film.

Filming began February 19, 1991, occupying nine sound stages at Sony Pictures Studios in Culver City, California. Stage 30 housed the Neverland Lost Boys playground, while Stage 10 supplied Captain Hook's ship cabin. Hidden hydraulics were installed to rock the set-piece to simulate a swaying ship, but the filmmakers found the movement distracted from the dialogue, so the idea was dropped. Stage 27 housed the full-sized Jolly Roger and the surrounding Pirate Wharf. Industrial Light & Magic provided the visual effects sequences. This marked the beginning of Tony Swatton's career, as he was asked to make weaponry for the film.

The film was financed by Amblin Entertainment and TriStar Pictures, with TriStar distributing it. Spielberg hired John Napier as a "visual consultant", having been impressed with his work on Cats. The original production budget was set at $48 million, but ended up between $60–80 million. The primary reason for the increased budget was the shooting schedule, which ran 40 days over its original 76-day schedule. Spielberg explained, "It was all my fault. I began to work at a slower pace than I usually do."

Spielberg's on-set relationship with Julia Roberts was troubled, and he stated in a 1992 interview with 60 Minutes, "It was an unfortunate time for us to work together." In a 1999 Vanity Fair interview, Roberts said that Spielberg's comments "really hurt my feelings". She "couldn't believe this person that I knew and trusted was actually hesitating to come to my defense... it was the first time that I felt I had a turncoat in my midst."

== Soundtrack ==
Hook (Original Motion Picture Soundtrack)

Film score by John Williams
- Released: November 26, 1991 (original); March 27, 2012 (reissue)
- Length: 75:18 (original); 140:34 (reissue)
- Labels: Epic Soundtrax (original); La-La Land Records (reissue)

John Williams chronology
Home Alone (1990)	Hook (Original Motion Picture Soundtrack) (1991)	JFK (1991)

The film score was composed and conducted by John Williams, and performed by the Hollywood Studio Symphony. He was brought in at an early stage when Spielberg was considering making the film as a musical. Williams wrote approximately eight songs with lyricist Leslie Bricusse for the project at this stage. Williams and Bricusse finalized it to five songs. Several of these songs were recorded and some musical segments were even filmed.

Julie Andrews recorded one song, "Childhood", at the Sony Pictures Studios, so that Maggie Smith could lip-sync it on-set; it was meant to be sung by Granny Wendy Darling to her grandchildren in their bedroom. Two additional songs, "Stick with Me" and "Low Below", performed by Dustin Hoffman and Bob Hoskins, respectively, were also rehearsed. These three songs were ultimately cut from the film, and instead were incorporated into the instrumental score. Two remaining songs survive in the finished film: "We Don't Wanna Grow Up" and "When You're Alone", both with lyrics by Bricusse. The "Prologue" track later appeared in a commercial for the 68th Academy Awards in 1995, and in trailers for Matilda (1996), another film by TriStar.

The original 1991 issue was released by Epic Soundtrax. In 2012, a limited edition of the soundtrack, called Hook: Expanded Original Motion Picture Soundtrack, was released by La-La Land Records and Sony Music. It contains almost the complete score, with alternates and unused material. It also contains liner notes that explain the film's production and score recording.

Commercial songs from the film, but not on the soundtrack

- "Pick'em Up" – Music by John Williams and lyrics by Leslie Bricusse
- "Take Me Out to the Ball Game" – Written by Jack Norworth and Albert Von Tilzer

On December 1, 2023, La-La Land Records released a remastered and expanded three-disc ultimate edition of the film's score in its entirety. The first disc includes the score presentation. The second disc features the additional musical tracks, and the third disc features alternate cues, source music and Leslie Bricusse's songs.

== Video games ==
A video game based on the film and bearing the same name was released for various game consoles in 1992. Another game was released for personal computer and Commodore Amiga, and is a point-and-click adventure game.

== Reception ==
=== Box office ===
Spielberg, Williams and Hoffman did not take salaries for Hook. Their deal called for them to split 40% of TriStar Pictures' gross revenues. They were to receive $20 million from the first $50 million in gross theatrical film rentals, with TriStar keeping the next $70 million in rentals before the three resumed receiving their percentage.

Hook was released in North America December 11, 1991, earning $13.5 million in its opening weekend. It went on to gross $119.7 million in the United States and Canada, and $181.2 million in foreign countries, accumulating a worldwide total of $300.9 million. It is the sixth-highest-grossing pirate-themed film, behind all five films in the Pirates of the Caribbean film series. In the United States and Canada, it was the sixth-highest-grossing film in 1991, and fourth-highest-grossing worldwide. It was the second-highest-grossing film in Japan, with theatrical rentals of $22.4 million. It ended up making a profit of $50 million for the studio, yet it was still declared a financial disappointment, having been overshadowed by the release of Disney's Beauty and the Beast and a decline in box-office receipts compared to the previous years.

=== Critical response ===
Hook received mixed to unfavorable reviews upon release. On review aggregator Rotten Tomatoes 37% of critics have given the film a positive review based on 139 reviews, with an average rating of 5.6/10. The site's consensus states: "The look of Hook is lively indeed, but Steven Spielberg directs on autopilot here, giving in too quickly to his sentimental, syrupy qualities." On Metacritic, the film has a 52 out of 100 rating, based on reviews from 19 critics, indicating "mixed or average" reviews. Audiences polled by CinemaScore gave the film an average grade of "A−" on a scale of A+ to F.

Roger Ebert of the Chicago Sun-Times wrote:

The sad thing about the screenplay for Hook is that it's so correctly titled: This whole construction is really nothing more than a hook on which to hang a new version of the Peter Pan story. No effort is made to involve Peter's magic in the changed world he now inhabits, and little thought has been given to Captain Hook's extraordinary persistence in wanting to revisit the events of the past. The failure in Hook is its inability to re-imagine the material, to find something new, fresh or urgent to do with the Peter Pan myth. Lacking that, Spielberg should simply have remade the original story, straight, for this generation.

Peter Travers of Rolling Stone magazine felt it would "only appeal to the baby boomer generation", and highly criticized the sword-fighting choreography. Vincent Canby of The New York Times felt the story structure was not well balanced, feeling Spielberg depended too much on art direction. Hal Hinson of The Washington Post was one of the few who gave it a positive review. Hinson elaborated on crucial themes of children, adulthood and loss of innocence. However, he said Spielberg "was stuck too much in a theme park world".

John Williams' musical score was particularly praised, and is considered by many as one of his best. However, the score notably failed to receive an Academy Award for Best Original Score nomination (although Williams did receive a nomination for Best Original Song). Filmmaker Jon M. Chu cited the film as a source of inspiration for the visual aesthetics of his two-part film adaptation of the musical Wicked (2024, 2025).

=== Spielberg's assessment ===
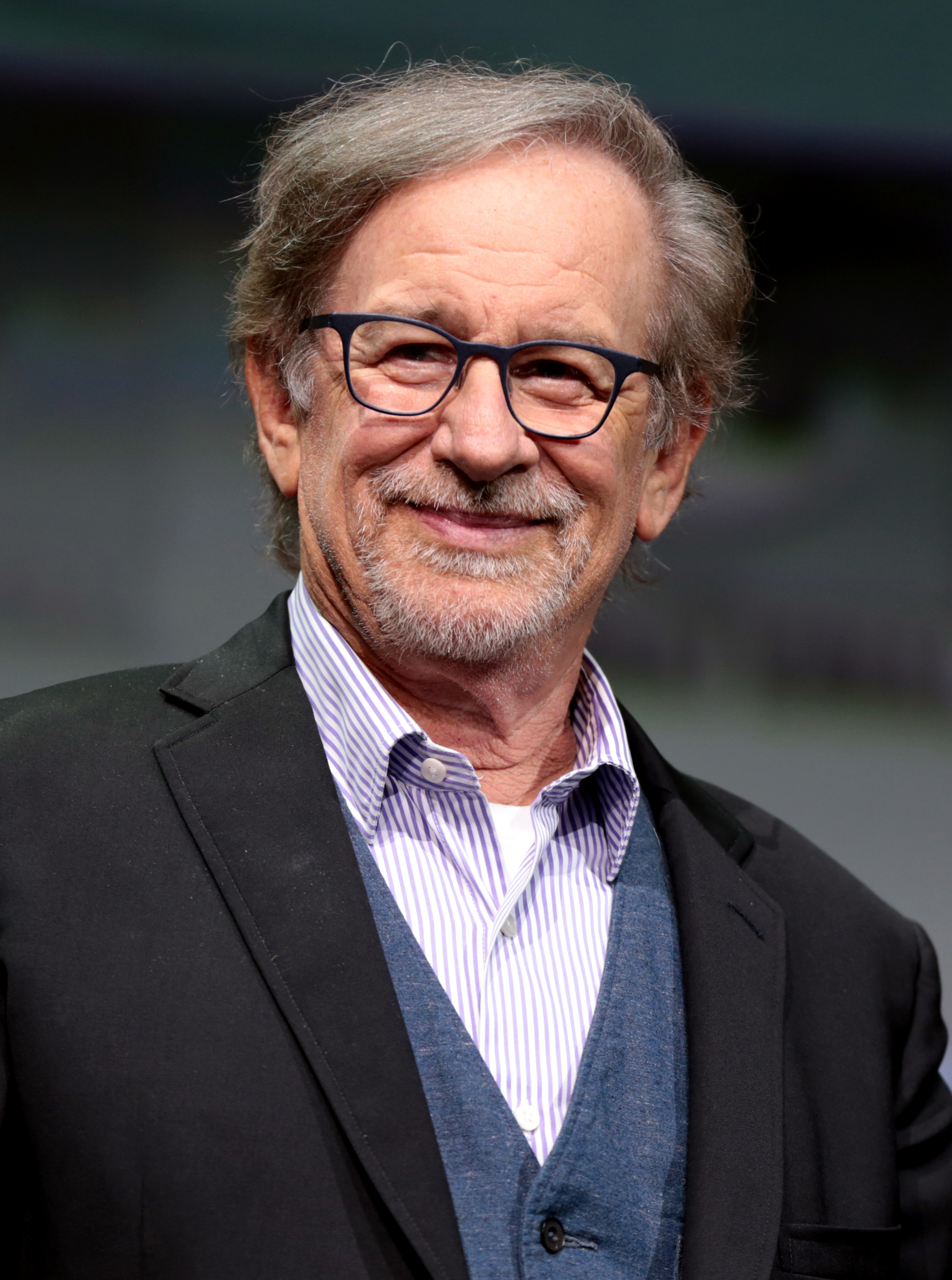
Steven Spielberg later admitted that he was largely disappointed with Hook.

Spielberg has stated in interviews that he was not proud of the film, and disappointed with the final result. In 2011, he told Entertainment Weekly, "There are parts of Hook I love. I'm really proud of my work right up through Peter being hauled off in the parachute out the window, heading for Neverland. I'm a little less proud of the Neverland sequences because I'm uncomfortable with that highly stylized world that today, of course, I would probably have done with live-action character work inside a completely digital set. But we didn't have the technology to do it then, and my imagination only went as far as building physical sets and trying to paint trees blue and red."

In a 2013 interview, after a positive reappraisal by critic Mark Kermode, Spielberg stated: "I wanna see Hook again because I so don't like that movie, and I'm hoping someday I'll see it again and perhaps like some of it." During the promotion of his film The BFG at the Cannes Film Festival in 2016, Spielberg reiterated his stance when journalists drew a comparison between the two films: "I hope [The BFG] has nothing to do with Hook. I hope it's totally different. I hope it's much better than Hook." About the movie's legacy, he said: "I don't like Hook very much, but my children love it. And there's a whole generation of young people who really enjoyed the movie far more than what I put into it.". In 2018, Spielberg told Empire, "I felt like a fish out of water making Hook... I didn't have confidence in the script. I had confidence in the first act and I had confidence in the epilogue. I didn't have confidence in the body of it." He added, "I didn't quite know what I was doing and I tried to paint over my insecurity with production value," adding that "the more insecure I felt about it, the bigger and more colorful the sets became."

== Accolades ==
Award	Category	Nominee(s)	Result	Ref.
Academy Awards	Best Art Direction	Art Direction: Norman Garwood; Set Decoration: Garrett Lewis	Nominated	
Academy Awards	Best Costume Design	Anthony Powell	Nominated	
Academy Awards	Best Makeup	Christina Smith, Monty Westmore and Greg Cannom	Nominated	
Academy Awards	Best Original Song	"When You're Alone"; Music by John Williams; Lyrics by Leslie Bricusse	Nominated	
Academy Awards	Best Visual Effects	Eric Brevig, Harley Jessup, Mark Sullivan and Michael Lantieri	Nominated	
American Comedy Awards	Funniest Supporting Actress in a Motion Picture	Maggie Smith	Nominated	
American Society of Cinematographers Awards	Outstanding Achievement in Cinematography in Theatrical Releases	Dean Cundey	Nominated	
BMI Film & TV Awards	Film Music Award	John Williams	Won	
Chicago Film Critics Association Awards	Most Promising Actor	Charlie Korsmo	Nominated	
Golden Globe Awards	Best Actor in a Motion Picture – Musical or Comedy	Dustin Hoffman	Nominated	
Golden Raspberry Awards	Worst Supporting Actress	Julia Roberts	Nominated	
Golden Screen Awards			Won	
GoldSpirit Awards	Best Edition of an Existing Score	John Williams	Won	
Grammy Awards	Best Pop Instrumental Performance	John Williams	Nominated	
Grammy Awards	Best Instrumental Composition Written for a Motion Picture or for Television	John Williams	Nominated	
International Film Music Critics Association Awards	Best Archival Release of an Existing Score	John Williams, Didier C. Deutsch, MV Gerhard, Matt Verboys, Mark G. Wilder, Daniel Schweiger and Jim Titus	Nominated	
International Film Music Critics Association Awards	Best Archival Release	John Williams, Mike Matessino, John Takis, Jason LeBlanc and Jim Titus	Nominated	
Saturn Awards	Best Fantasy Film		Nominated	
Young Artist Awards	Best Family Motion Picture		Won	
Young Artist Awards	Best Young Actor Co-Starring in a Motion Picture	Dante Basco	Nominated	
Young Artist Awards	Best Young Actor Co-Starring in a Motion Picture	Charlie Korsmo	Nominated	
Young Artist Awards	Best Young Actor Under 10 in a Motion Picture	Raushan Hammond	Nominated	
Young Artist Awards	Best Young Actress Under 10 in a Motion Picture	Amber Scott	Nominated	
Young Artist Awards	Outstanding Young Ensemble Cast in a Motion Picture	Charlie Korsmo, Amber Scott, Ryan Francis, Dante Basco, Raushan Hammond, Jasen Fisher, James Madio, Isaiah Robinson, Thomas Tulak, Alex Zuckerman, Ahmad Stone, Bogdan Georghe, Adam McNatt, René González Jr, Brian Willis and Alex Gaona	Won	

== Adaptation ==
Marvel Comics published a comic book adaptation. Charles Vess adapted the script and was one of many artists who illustrated it.

== See also ==
- List of films featuring miniature people

== Bibliography ==
- Brooks, Terry (1991). Hook (Hardcover). novelization of the film. Ballantine Books. ISBN 0449907074.
- Charles L.P. Silet (2002). The Films of Steven Spielberg. Scarecrow Press. ISBN 0810841827.
- McBride, Joseph (1997). Steven Spielberg: A Biography. New York City: Faber and Faber. ISBN 0571191770.
- Medavoy, Mike; Young, Josh (2002). You're Only as Good as Your Next One: 100 Great Films, 100 Good Films, and 100 for Which I Should Be Shot. New York City: Atria Books. ISBN 9780743400558.
