= Norman T. Leavitt =

American make-up artist

- Occupation: Make-up artist
- Parent: Norman Leavitt (father)

Norman T. Leavitt is an American make-up artist. He won two Primetime Emmy Awards and was nominated for nine more in the category Outstanding Makeup for his work on the television programs Chicago Hope and Grey's Anatomy.
