= Frank Needham =

English cricketer (1861–1923)

Frank Needham (27 August 1861 – 15 October 1923) was an English first-class cricketer active 1890–1901 who played for Nottinghamshire. He was born and died in Arnold, Nottinghamshire.
