= John Caglione Jr. =

American make-up artist

- Born: 1958 (age 67–68)
- Occupation: Make-up artist
- Years active: 1981–present

John Caglione Jr. (born c. 1958) is a make-up artist known for his work in film and television. Born in the late 1950s, Caglione began his career in the make-up industry at the age of 15. He had the opportunity to work with renowned make-up artist Dick Smith, who he cites as a major influence on his career.

Caglione started his career in New York City, where he worked as the make-up artist for the cast of Saturday Night Live from 1976 to 1981. He has since gone on to work on a number of high-profile projects, including the 1990 film Dick Tracy and the 2008 film The Dark Knight. For his work on Dick Tracy, Caglione won an Academy Award for Best Makeup, which he shared with Doug Drexler. He was also nominated for an Academy Award for Best Makeup for his work on The Dark Knight, which he shared with Conor O'Sullivan.

Caglione continues to work in the make-up industry, bringing his talent and expertise to a wide range of projects. His work has been recognized and celebrated by his peers, and he is considered one of the top make-up artists in the film and television industry.

== Makeup work ==
=== Films ===
- Basket Case (1982)
- Amityville II: The Possession (1982)
- C.H.U.D. (1984)
- Year of The Dragon (1985)
- Poltergeist III (1988)
- Dick Tracy (1990)
- Insomnia (2002)
- Unfaithful (2002)
- The Recruit (2003)
- Gigli (2003)
- Mona Lisa Smile (2003)
- Hide and Seek (2005)
- My Super Ex-Girlfriend (2006)
- The Departed (2006)
- 3:10 To Yuma (2007)
- American Gangster (2007)
- The Dark Knight (2008)
- Tenderness (2009)
- Tower Heist (2011)
- The Amazing Spider-Man 2 (2014)
- Winter's Tale (2014)

=== Television ===
- Angels in America (2003 miniseries)
- The Sopranos
- American Tragedy
- The David Letterman Show
- The Tonight Show with Jay Leno
- Witness to the Mob
- Another World
- The Doctors
- Saturday Night Live (1976–1981)
- The Tomorrow Show
