= Matthew W. Mungle =

American make-up artist

- Born: October 26, 1956 (age 69); Atoka, Oklahoma, USA
- Occupation: Makeup Artist
- Years active: 1981–present

Matthew W. Mungle (born October 26, 1956) is an American make-up artist. He has been nominated five times for the Academy Award for Best Makeup, winning (as part of a three-person team) in 1992 for Bram Stoker's Dracula. He has also received 26 Emmy nominations, winning 6. His television work includes Tracey Ullman in the Trailer Tales, Tracey Ullman's State of the Union, CSI: Crime Scene Investigation, The Big Bang Theory, Salem, NCIS, Conan, and Jimmy Kimmel Live!.

Mungle's other film work includes Norbit, Epic Movie, Disaster Movie, Psycho (1998), The Butler, Superhero Movie, Frida, Vampires Suck, Sky High, The Tempest, The Midnight Meat Train, Date Movie, Monster House, and The Polar Express.

Mungle has also done special effects makeup for commercials for FedEx, Frito-Lay, Universal Parks and Resorts, McDonald's, KFC, Best Buy, Lunchables, and Sprint Corporation.

Mungle has also worked on the Disney Dream Portrait Series photograph featuring, Jack Black, Jason Segel, and Will Ferrell as The Hitchhiking Ghosts from the Disney attraction, The Haunted Mansion, in 2012.

Mungle is a native of Atoka, Oklahoma, and graduated from Atoka High School in 1975. He studied for two and a half years at Oklahoma State University before moving to Hollywood in 1977. He studied under make-up artist Joe Blasco, then became an instructor at Blasco's school and worked in low-budget horror films before his career moved into larger projects beginning with Edward Scissorhands in 1990. In addition to Dracula, he has also received Oscar nominations for his work on Schindler's List (1993), Ghosts of Mississippi (1996), Albert Nobbs (2011), and Hillbilly Elegy (2020). Mungle created old-age makeups for the principal cast for the final episode of HBO's Six Feet Under. In Albert Nobbs, he used make-up and prosthetics for actresses Glenn Close and Janet McTeer's portrayals of women pretending to be men. Mungle also creates the masks of the Flying Monkeys and Doctor Dillamond, and Fiyero's scarecrow form for the Broadway musical, Wicked. Mungle previously owned a makeup studio in North Hollywood. Mungle currently owns a makeup studio in Texas.
