= Greg Cannom =

American special make-up effects artist (1951–2025)

- Born: September 5, 1951; Los Angeles, California, U.S.
- Died: May 3, 2025 (aged 73)
- Education: Cypress College
- Occupation: Special make-up effects artist
- Years active: 1977–2025

Gregory Cannom (September 5, 1951 – May 3, 2025) was an American special make-up effects artist who was the recipient of several accolades, including five Academy Awards and two Saturn Awards, and was nominated for four Primetime Emmy Awards and four BAFTA Awards.

Cannom was best known for his work on the films Hook (1991), Bram Stoker's Dracula (1992), Mrs. Doubtfire (1993), The Mask (1994), Titanic (1997), Bicentennial Man (1999), Hannibal (2001), The Passion of the Christ (2004), The Curious Case of Benjamin Button (2008), and Vice (2018). For his contributions, he was honored with an Academy Award for Technical Achievement in 2005 and a Lifetime Achievement Award given by the Make-Up Artists and Hair Stylists Guild in 2018.

Greg Cannom died on May 3, 2025, at the age of 73.

== Filmography ==
- The Eyes of Tammy Faye (2021) (co-prosthetic makeup designer)
- Vice (2018) (age makeup: Christian Bale)
- Fan (2016) (age makeup: Shah Rukh Khan)
- Kapoor and Sons (2016) (age makeup: Rishi Kapoor)
- Abraham Lincoln: Vampire Hunter (2012) (special makeup creator and applicator)
- The Curious Case of Benjamin Button (2008) (age makeups creator and applicator)
- Babel (2006) (age makeup: Brad Pitt) (uncredited)
- Big Momma's House 2 (2006) (special makeup effects creator)
- The Exorcism of Emily Rose (2005) (makeup effects consultant)
- The Life and Death of Peter Sellers (2004) (special makeup effects artist)
- Van Helsing (2004) (special makeup designer)
- White Chicks (2004) (makeup effects creator)
- The Whole Ten Yards (2004) (age makeup artist: Kevin Pollak) (uncredited)
- The Passion of the Christ (2004) (makeup effects consultant)
- Master and Commander: The Far Side of the World (2003) (special makeup artist: Russell Crowe)
- Pirates of the Caribbean: The Curse of the Black Pearl (2003) (special makeup effects artist)
- Bulletproof Monk (2003) (prosthetic makeup artist) (special makeup effects artist)
- The Singing Detective (2003) (special makeup effects artist)
- A Beautiful Mind (2001) (special makeup designer)
- Ali (2001) (special makeup effects artist)
- America's Sweethearts (2001) (special makeup effects artist)
- Monkeybone (2001) (special makeup effects)
- Hannibal (2001) (special makeup designer)
- Little Nicky (2000) (age makeup artist: Dana Carvey)
- Big Momma's House (2000) (special makeup effects)
- Bicentennial Man (1999) (special age makeup)
- The Insider (1999) (special makeup artist: Russell Crowe)
- Idle Hands (1999) (special makeup effects artist)
- Blade (1998) (special makeup effects artist)
- From the Earth to the Moon (1998) (mini) TV Series (special age makeup)
- House of Frankenstein (1997) (TV) (special makeup effects creator)
  - a.k.a. House of Frankenstein 1997
- Titanic (1997) (old Rose special effects makeup)
- Kull the Conqueror (1997) (special makeup artist) (creature effects)
- Steel (1997) (Steel's Suit Designer)
- Thinner (1996) (special makeup effects)
  - a.k.a. Stephen King's Thinner
- The Puppet Masters (1994) (special makeup effects)
  - a.k.a. Robert A. Heinlein's The Puppet Masters
- The Mask (1994) (creator special makeup)
- The Shadow (1994) (special makeup)
- Mrs. Doubtfire (1993) (special makeup designer)
- The Man Without a Face (1993) (special makeup creator)
- Hoffa (1992) (special makeup designer)
- Forever Young (1992) (special makeup)
- Bram Stoker's Dracula (1992) (special makeup effects)
- Batman Returns (1992) (special makeup effects artist) (designer: Penguin Hand) (uncredited)
- Alien 3 (1992) (special makeup effects: Los Angeles)
- Hook (1991) (special makeup)
- Star Trek VI: The Undiscovered Country (1991) (special alien dog makeup)
- Kickboxer 2: The Road Back (1991) (special makeup)
- Highlander II: The Quickening (1991) (special makeup)
  - Highlander II: The Renegade Version (UK: director's cut) (US: video title (director's cut))
- Subspecies (1991) (special makeup effects)
- Postcards from the Edge (1990) (special makeup artist: Shirley Maclaine) (uncredited)
- The Exorcist III (1990) (special makeup effects creator)
  - a.k.a. The Exorcist III: Legion
  - a.k.a. William Peter Blatty's The Exorcist III
- Flatliners (1990) (special makeup effects artist) (uncredited)
- Dick Tracy (1990) (special makeup application) (uncredited)
- Tales from the Crypt (special effects makeup creator) (2 episodes, 1990) (special makeup artist) (2 episodes, 1989–1990)
- Cyborg (1989) (special makeup)
- Monsters (special makeup artist) (1 episode, 1989)
- Fright Night Part 2 (1988) (special makeup creator: "Louie" and "Bocworth")
- Big Top Pee-wee (1988) (special makeup)
- The Lost Boys (1987) (special makeup effects)
- Werewolf (1987) TV Series (special makeup)
- A Nightmare on Elm Street 3: Dream Warriors (1987) (special makeup effects sequences)
  - a.k.a. A Nightmare on Elm Street Part III
- Vamp (1986) (special makeup)
- Amazing Stories (special makeup artist) (1 episode, 1985) (special makeup effects artist) (1 episode, 1985)
- Cocoon (1985) (special makeup effects)
- Dreamscape (1984) (special makeup)
- Thriller (1983) (V) (special makeup effects artist)
  - a.k.a. Michael Jackson's Thriller (US: complete title)
- The Sword and the Sorcerer (1982) (special makeup effects)
- The Incredible Shrinking Woman (1981) (special makeup effects)
- The Howling (1981) (special makeup effects artist)
- It Lives Again (1978) (special makeup effects) (assistant to Rick Baker)
  - a.k.a. It's Alive II
- The Fury (1978) (special makeup assistant)
- Manbeast! Myth or Monster? (1978) (special makeup effects artist)
- The Incredible Melting Man (1977) (special makeup assistant)
- Hot Tomorrows (1977) (special makeup effects artist)

== Awards and nominations ==
=== Major awards ===
Key
†	Indicates non-competitive categories

==== Academy Awards ====
Year	Category	Nominated work	Result
1992	Best Makeup	Hook	Nominated
1993	Best Makeup	Bram Stoker's Dracula	Won
1993	Best Makeup	Hoffa	Nominated
1994	Best Makeup	Mrs. Doubtfire	Won
1996	Best Makeup	Roommates	Nominated
1998	Best Makeup	Titanic	Nominated
2000	Best Makeup	Bicentennial Man	Nominated
2002	Best Makeup	A Beautiful Mind	Nominated
2005	Technical Achievement Award †	—N/a	Honored
2009	Best Makeup	The Curious Case of Benjamin Button	Won
2019	Best Makeup and Hairstyling	Vice	Won

==== Primetime Emmy Awards ====
Year	Category	Nominated work	Result
1995	Outstanding Makeup for a Series	Earth 2: After The Thaw	Nominated
1998	Outstanding Makeup for a Limited Series or Movie	From the Earth to the Moon	Nominated
2006	Outstanding Makeup for a Series (Non-Prosthetic)	Will & Grace: Finale	Nominated
2014	Outstanding Prosthetic Makeup for a Series, Miniseries, Movie or a Special	The Anna Nicole Story	Nominated

==== British Academy Film Awards ====
Year	Category	Nominated work	Result
1994	Best Make Up	Bram Stoker's Dracula	Nominated
1995	Best Makeup and Hair	The Mask	Nominated
1995	Best Makeup and Hair	Mrs. Doubtfire	Nominated
2019	Best Makeup and Hair	Vice	Nominated

==== Saturn Awards ====
Year	Category	Nominated work	Result
1988	Best Make-up	The Lost Boys	Nominated
1993	Best Make-up	Bram Stoker's Dracula	Nominated
1995	Best Make-up	The Mask	Nominated
1997	Best Make-up	Thinner	Nominated
1999	Best Make-up	Blade	Nominated
2002	Best Make-up	Hannibal	Won
2005	Best Make-up	Van Helsing	Nominated
2009	Best Make-up	The Curious Case of Benjamin Button	Won

==== Make-Up Artists and Hair Stylists Guild Awards ====
Year	Category	Nominated work	Result
2000	Best Special Make-Up Effects – Feature	Bicentennial Man	Won
2002	Best Special Make-Up Effects – Feature	Hannibal	Nominated
2003	Best Make-Up – Television Mini-Series/Movie of the Week	Gleason	Won
2018	Lifetime Achievement Award †	—N/a	Honored
2019	Best Special Make-Up Effects – Feature-Length Motion Picture	Vice	Won

== See also ==
- Prosthetic makeup
- Special effect
