= Primetime Emmy Award for Outstanding Prosthetic Makeup =

Television award category

Primetime Emmy Award for Prosthetic Makeup
- Awarded for: Outstanding Prosthetic Makeup
- Country: United States
- Presented by: Academy of Television Arts & Sciences
- Currently held by: The Pitt (2026)
- Website: emmys.com

This is a list of winners and nominees of the Primetime Emmy Award for Outstanding Prosthetic Makeup.

In the following list, the first titles listed in gold are the winners; those not in gold are nominees, which are listed in alphabetical order. The years given are those in which the ceremonies took place:

== Winners and nominations ==
=== 2000s ===
Year	Program	Episode	Nominees	Network
2002
2002	Outstanding Prosthetic Makeup for a Miniseries or Movie			
2002	Jack and the Beanstalk: The Real Story	"Part 2"	Daniel Auber, Stephen Bettles, John Cormican, Chris Fitzgerald	CBS
2002	Band of Brothers	"Carentan"	Daniel Parker, Matthew Smith, Duncan Jarman	HBO
2002	Outstanding Prosthetic Makeup for a Series			
2002	Six Feet Under	"A Private Life"	Dan Rebert, Thomas Floutz, Lee Romaire, Todd Masters, Scott Tebeau, Donna-Lou Henderson, Justin B. Henderson, Kylie Bell	HBO
2002	Buffy the Vampire Slayer	"Hell's Bells"	Todd McIntosh, Jay Wejebe, Carol Schwartz, Brigette A. Myre, Joel Harlow, John Vulich	UPN
2002	CSI: Crime Scene Investigation	"Overload"	John Goodwin	CBS
2002	Star Trek: Enterprise	"Broken Bow"	Michael Westmore, Art Anthony, Belinda Bryant, David DeLeon, Suzanne Diaz, Earl Ellis, Jeff Lewis, Brad Look, Joe Podnar, Karen Westerfield, June Westmore, Natalie Wood	UPN
2003
2003	Outstanding Prosthetic Makeup for a Miniseries or Movie			
2003	Door to Door		Matthew W. Mungle, Charles Porlier, Jayne Dancose	TNT
2003	Soldier's Girl		Raymond Mackintosh, Russell Cate	Showtime
2003	Taken		Charles Porlier, Patricia Murray, Rebeccah Delchambre	Sci-Fi
2003	Outstanding Makeup for a Series (Prosthetic)			
2003	Primetime Glick	"Brendan Fraser / Ice Cube"	Kevin Haney, Kristina Vogel	Comedy Central
2003	CSI: Crime Scene Investigation	"Got Murder?"	John Goodwin, Jackie Tichenor	CBS
2003	MADtv	"806"	Jennifer Aspinall, Scott Wheeler, Randy Westgate, Nathalie Fratti, David Williams	Fox
2003	Six Feet Under	"Perfect Circles"	Todd Masters, Mark Garbarino, Scott Wheeler, Dan Rebert, Erik Schaper	HBO
2003	Star Trek: Enterprise	"Canamar"	Michael Westmore, Suzanne Diaz, Brad Look, Jeff Lewis, Earl Ellis, Michael Burnett, Joe Podnar, Todd McIntosh, Barry R. Koper, Art Anthony, Robert Maverick, Steven E. Anderson, Debbie Zoller, Roxy D'Alonzo, Ruth Haney, Judith Silverman	UPN
2004	Nip/Tuck	"Pilot"	Thomas R. Burman, Bari Dreiband-Burman, James MacKinnon	FX
2004	Star Trek: Enterprise	"Zero Hour"	Michael Westmore	UPN
2004	Tracey Ullman in the Trailer Tales		Matthew W. Mungle, Kate Shorter, Sally Sutton	HBO
2005	The Life and Death of Peter Sellers		Davy Jones, Wesley Wofford	HBO
2005	Carnivàle	"Damascus, NE"	Rob Hinderstein, Joel Harlow, Kenny Myers	HBO
2005	MADtv	"1013"	Jennifer Aspinall, Scott Wheeler, Randy Westgate, James Rohland	Fox
2005	Nip/Tuck	"Christian Troy"	Eryn Krueger Mekash, Stephanie A. Fowler, Mary Kay Morse, Thomas R. Burman, Bari Dreiband-Burman	FX
2005	Star Trek: Enterprise	"United"	Michael Westmore, Suzanne Diaz, Brad Look, Jeff Lewis, Earl Ellis, Garrett Immel	UPN
2006	Six Feet Under	"Everyone's Waiting"	John E. Jackson, Matthew W. Mungle, Michelle Vittone, Clinton Wayne	HBO
2006	Grey's Anatomy	"Yesterday"	Norman T. Leavitt, Brigitte Bugayong, Thomas R. Burman, Bari Dreiband-Burman	ABC
2006	Into the West	"Wheel to the Stars"	Gail Kennedy, Matthew W. Mungle	TNT
2006	MADtv	"1117"	Jennifer Aspinall, Heather Mages, Wade Daily, Douglas Noe, James Rohland, David Williams	Fox
2006	Nip/Tuck	"Cherry Peck"	Eryn Krueger Mekash, Stephanie A. Fowler, Thomas R. Burman, Bari Dreiband-Burman	FX
2007	House	"Que Sera Sera"	Dalia Dokter, Ed French, Jamie Kelman	Fox
2007	CSI: Crime Scene Investigation	"Living Legend"	Melanie Levitt, Tom Hoerber, Matthew W. Mungle, Clinton Wayne	CBS
2007	Grey's Anatomy	"My Favorite Mistake"	Norman T. Leavitt, Brigitte Bugayong, Thomas R. Burman, Bari Dreiband-Burman	ABC
2007	MADtv	"1203"	Jennifer Aspinall, Heather Mages, James Rohland, Randy Westgate, Scott Wheeler	Fox
2007	Nip/Tuck	"Conor McNamara"	Eryn Krueger Mekash, Stephanie A. Fowler, Bill Corso, Mary Kay Morse, Christopher Allen Nelson, Christien Tinsley	FX
2008	John Adams		John R. Bayless, Chris Burgoyne, Matthew W. Mungle, Trefor Proud	HBO
2008	Grey's Anatomy	"Forever Young"	Norman T. Leavitt, Brigitte Bugayong, Thomas R. Burman, Bari Dreiband-Burman	ABC
2008	Mad Men	"Nixon vs. Kennedy"	Debbie Zoller, Joel Harlow, Brian Penikas, Jake Garber	AMC
2008	Pushing Daisies	"Smell of Success"	Todd McIntosh, David DeLeon, Sara De Pue	ABC
2008	Tracey Ullman's State of the Union	"104"	Sally Sutton, Matthew W. Mungle	Showtime
2009	Grey Gardens		Vivian Baker, Bill Corso, Linda Dowds, Sean Sansom	HBO
2009	CSI: Crime Scene Investigation	"A Space Oddity"	Matthew W. Mungle, Clinton Wayne, Melanie Levitt, Tom Hoerber	CBS
2009	Grey's Anatomy	"Stand by Me"	Norman T. Leavitt, Bari Dreiband-Burman, Thomas R. Burman, Vincent Van Dyke	ABC
2009	Little Britain USA	"105"	John E. Jackson, Matthew W. Mungle, Chris Burgoyne	HBO
2009	Nip/Tuck	"Budi Sabri"	Bari Dreiband-Burman, Thomas R. Burman, David Dupuis	FX
2009	Tracey Ullman's State of the Union	"205"	Matthew W. Mungle, Sally Sutton, Kate Shorter	Showtime

=== 2010s ===
Year	Program	Episode	Nominees	Network
2010	The Pacific		Chad Atkinson, Jason Baird, Jac Charlton, Robert Charlton, Sean Genders, Steve Katz, Greg Nicotero, Ben Rittenhouse	HBO
2010	Castle	"Vampire Weekend"	Debbie Zoller, Stephen Prouty, Todd McIntosh	ABC
2010	Grey's Anatomy	"How Insensitive"	Norman T. Leavitt, Bari Dreiband-Burman, Thomas Floutz, Bart Mixon, Vincent Van Dyke, Thomas R. Burman	ABC
2010	Nip/Tuck	"Enigma"	Stephanie A. Fowler, Bari Dreiband-Burman, Bart Mixon, Michele Tyminski, Thomas Floutz, Thomas R. Burman, Vincent Van Dyke	FX
2010	True Blood	"Scratches"	Brigette A. Myre, Ned Neidhardt, Bernhard Eichholz, Anthony Allen Barlow, Sam Polin, Danielle Noe, Todd Masters, Dan Rebert	HBO
2011	The Walking Dead	"Days Gone Bye"	Greg Nicotero, Jaremy Aiello, Howard Berger, Jake Garber, Garrett Immel, Andy Schoneberg, Kevin Wasner	AMC
2011	The Cape	"Razer"	Camille Calvet, Karen Iverson, Mary Kay Morse, Suzanne Diaz, Christopher Allen Nelson, Greg Nelson, Matthew W. Mungle, Michael Shawn McCracken	NBC
2011	Game of Thrones	"A Golden Crown"	Paul Engelen, Conor O'Sullivan	HBO
2011	Glee	"The Sue Sylvester Shuffle"	Eryn Krueger Mekash, Jennifer Greenberg, Kelley Mitchell, Robin L. Neal, Mike Mekash, Melissa Buell, Christien Tinsley, Hiroshi Yada	Fox
2011	Grey's Anatomy	"Superfreak"	Norman T. Leavitt, Thomas Floutz, Bari Dreiband-Burman, Susan Laprelle, Ed French, Vincent Van Dyke, Thomas R. Burman	ABC
2012	The Walking Dead	"What Lies Ahead"	Greg Nicotero, Gino Crognale, Jake Garber, Garrett Immel, Carey Jones, Andy Schoneberg, Kevin Wasner	AMC
2012	American Horror Story		Eryn Krueger Mekash, Mike Mekash, Christopher Allen Nelson, Kim Ayers, Christien Tinsley, Jason Hamer, Hiroshi Yada	FX
2012	Boardwalk Empire	"The Age of Reason"	Michele Paris, Craig Lindberg, Jeremy Selenfriend, Michael Marino, David Presto, Michael Fontaine	HBO
2012	Game of Thrones	"Valar Morghulis"	Paul Engelen, Conor O'Sullivan, Robert Trenton	HBO
2012	Once Upon a Time	"Dreamy"	Toby Lindala, Sarah Graham	ABC
2013	Behind the Candelabra		Christine Beveridge, Kate Biscoe, Hiroshi Yada, Jamie Kelman, Stephen Kelley, Todd Kleitsch, Christien Tinsley	HBO
2013	American Horror Story: Asylum		Eryn Krueger Mekash, Mike Mekash, Hiroshi Yada, Christopher Allen Nelson, Kim Ayers, Silvina Knight, Christien Tinsley, Jason Hamer	FX
2013	Game of Thrones	"Valar Dohaeris"	Paul Engelen, Conor O'Sullivan, Robert Trenton	HBO
2013	Saturday Night Live	"Host: Jennifer Lawrence"	Louie Zakarian, Josh Turi, Tom Denier Jr., Craig Lindberg	NBC
2013	The Walking Dead	"This Sorrowful Life"	Greg Nicotero, Gino Crognale, Jake Garber, Garrett Immel, Carey Jones, Derek Krout, Andy Schoneberg, Kevin Wasner	AMC
2014	Game of Thrones	"The Children"	Barrie Gower, Jane Walker	HBO
2014	American Horror Story: Coven		Eryn Krueger Mekash, Mike Mekash, Christien Tinsley, Jason Hamer, Christopher Allen Nelson, David LeRoy Anderson, Cristina Patterson, Robert Freitas	FX
2014	Anna Nicole		Justin Raleigh, Kevin Kirkpatrick, Kelly Golden, Ozzy Alvarez, Danielle Noe, Bernhard Eichholz, Michael Ezell, Kodai Yoshizawa	Lifetime
2014	Boardwalk Empire	"William Wilson"	Michele Paris, Joseph Farulla	HBO
2014	Breaking Bad	"Felina"	Greg Nicotero, Howard Berger, Tarra D. Day, Stephan Dupuis, Steve La Porte	AMC
2014	The Normal Heart		Eryn Krueger Mekash, Sherri Berman Laurence, Christien Tinsley, Mary Anne Spano, James Sarzotti, Nicky Pattison	HBO
2015	American Horror Story: Freak Show		David LeRoy Anderson, Kim Ayers, Luis García, James MacKinnon, Eryn Krueger Mekash, Mike Mekash, Christopher Allen Nelson, Justin Raleigh	FX
2015	Boardwalk Empire	"The Good Listener"	Michele Paris, Joseph Farulla	HBO
2015	Game of Thrones	"Hardhome"	Jane Walker, Barrie Gower, Sarah Gower	HBO
2015	The Knick	"Crutchfield"	Justin Raleigh, Kevin Kirkpatrick, Kelly Golden, Ozzy Alvarez, Danielle Noe, Bernhard Eichholz, Michael Ezell, Kodai Yoshizawa	Cinemax
2015	Penny Dreadful	"Grand Guignol"	Nick Dudman, Sarita Allison, Barney Nikolic	Showtime
2015	The Walking Dead	"Strangers"	Greg Nicotero, Gino Crognale, Jake Garber, Garrett Immel, Carey Jones, Andy Schoneberg, Kevin Wasner	AMC
2016	Game of Thrones	"The Door"	Barrie Gower, Sarah Gower, Emma Sheffield, Tristan Versluis, Jane Walker	HBO
2016	All the Way		Bill Corso, Francisco X. Perez, Sabrina Wilson, Andrew Clement	HBO
2016	American Horror Story: Hotel		Eryn Krueger Mekash, Mike Mekash, Bradley A. Palmer, Bart Mixon, James MacKinnon, Kevin Kirkpatrick, David LeRoy Anderson, Glen Eisner	FX
2016	Penny Dreadful	"And Hell Itself My Only Foe"	Nick Dudman, Sarita Allison, Barney Nikolic, Paul Spateri, Dennis Penkov	Showtime
2016	The Walking Dead	"No Way Out"	Greg Nicotero, Gino Crognale, Jake Garber, Garrett Immel, Kerrin Jackson, Carey Jones, Kevin Wasner	AMC
2017
2017	American Horror Story: Roanoke		Eryn Krueger Mekash, Mike Mekash, David LeRoy Anderson, James Mackinnon, Jason Hamer, Melanie Eichner, Cristina Himiob, Maiko Chiba	FX
2017	Penny Dreadful	"No Beast So Fierce"	Nick Dudman, Sarita Allison, Barney Nikolic, Dennis Penkov	Showtime
2017	Saturday Night Live	"Host: Alec Baldwin"	Louie Zakarian, Jason Milani, Tom Denier Jr., Amy Tagliamonti, Craig Lindberg, Steve Kelly	NBC
2017	The Walking Dead	"The Day Will Come When You Won't Be"	Greg Nicotero, Gino Crognale, Jake Garber, Garrett Immel, Kerrin Jackson, Kevin Wasner	AMC
2017	Westworld	"The Original"	Christien Tinsley, Hiroshi Yada, Georgia Allen, Gerald Quist, Myriam Arougheti	HBO
2018
2018	Game of Thrones	"The Dragon and the Wolf"	Jane Walker, Paul Spateri, Emma Faulkes, Barrie Gower	HBO
2018	American Horror Story: Cult		Eryn Krueger Mekash, Mike Mekash, Kim Ayers, Silvina Knight, Christopher Nelson, Carleigh Herbert, Glen Eisner, David LeRoy Anderson	FX
2018	The Assassination of Gianni Versace: American Crime Story		Eryn Krueger Mekash, Mike Mekash, Silvina Knight, Robin Beauchesne, David LeRoy Anderson, Glen Eisner	FX
2018	Star Trek: Discovery	"Will You Take My Hand?"	Glenn Hetrick, James Mackinnon, Hugo Villasenor, Rocky Faulkner, Chris Bridges, Shane Zander, Neville Page, Michael O'Brien	CBS All Access
2018	Westworld	"The Riddle of the Sphinx"	Justin Raleigh, Kevin Kirkpatrick, Thomas Floutz, Chris Hampton, Bryan Blair, Michael Ezell, Steve Koch	HBO
2019
2019	Star Trek: Discovery	"If Memory Serves"	Glenn Hetrick, James Mackinnon, Hugo Villasenor, Rocky Faulkner, Chris Bridges, Nicola Bendrey, Mike O'Brien, Neville Page	CBS All Access
2019	American Horror Story: Apocalypse	"Apocalypse Then"	Eryn Krueger Mekash, Mike Mekash, Steve La Porte, Jake Garber, Vance Hartwell, Silvina Knight, Glen Eisner, David LeRoy Anderson	FX
2019	Chernobyl		Barrie Gower, Paul Spateri, Daniel Parker, Patt Foad, Victoria Bancroft-Perry, Robin Pritchard, Lucy Pittard	HBO
2019	Fosse/Verdon		Debbie Zoller, Dave Presto, Jackie Risotto, Yoichi Art Sakamoto, Vincent Van Dyke	FX
2019	Game of Thrones	"The Long Night"	Emma Faulkes, Paul Spateri, Chloe Muton-Phillips, Duncan Jarman, Patt Foad, John Eldred-Tooby, Barrie Gower, Sarah Gower	HBO

=== 2020s ===
Year	Program	Episode	Nominees	Network
2020
2020	Star Trek: Picard	"Absolute Candor"	James Robert Mackinnon, Vincent Van Dyke, Richard Redlefsen, Alexei Dmitriew, Neville Page, Michael Ornelaz	CBS All Access
2020	American Horror Story: 1984	"True Killers"	Mike Mekash, Vincent Van Dyke	FX
2020	Hollywood	"Jump"	Vincent Van Dyke, Cary Ayers, Bruce Spaulding Fuller	Netflix
2020	The Mandalorian	"Chapter 6: The Prisoner"	Brian Sipe, Alexei Dmitriew, Carlton Coleman, Samantha Ward, Scott Stoddard, Mike Ornelaz, Sabrina Castro	Disney+
2020	Pose	"Love's in Need of Love Today"	David Presto, Greg Pikulski, Brett Schmidt, Lisa Forst, Keith Palmer	FX
2020	Westworld	"Crisis Theory"	Justin Raleigh, Chris Hampton, Thomas Floutz	HBO
2021
2021	The Mandalorian	"Chapter 13: The Jedi"	Brian Sipe, Scott Patton, Alexei Dmitriew, Carlton Coleman, Pepe Mora, Scott Stoddard, Cale Thomas, Samantha Ward	Disney+
2021	Lovecraft Country	"Sundown"	Anna Cali, J. Anthony Kosar	HBO
2021	Pose	"On the Run"	Thomas Denier Jr.	FX
2021	Star Trek: Discovery	"That Hope Is You, Part 1"	Glenn Hetrick, Mike Smithson, Michael O'Brien, Ken Culver, Hugo Villasenor,	Paramount+
2021	This Is Us	"There"	Stephen Bettles, Elizabeth Hoel-Chang	NBC
2022
2022	Stranger Things	"Chapter Four: Dear Billy"	Barrie Gower, Duncan Jarman, Patt Foad, Mike Mekash, Eric Garcia, Nix Herrera	Netflix
2022	Angelyne	"Glow in the Dark Queen of the Universe"	Vincent Van Dyke, Kate Biscoe, Mike Mekash, Abby Lyle Clawson, Chris Burgoyne	Peacock
2022	Gaslit	"Final Days"	Kazu Hiro, Vincent Van Dyke, Richard Redrefsen, Christopher Nelson, Michael Ornelaz, Kelly Golden	Starz
2022	Impeachment: American Crime Story	"The Assassination of Monica Lewinsky"	Justin Raleigh, Greg Cannom, Thomas Floutz, Chris Hampton, Kelly Golden	FX
2022	Star Trek: Picard	"Hide and Seek"	James Mackinnon, Vincent Van Dyke, Kevin Kirkpatrick, Hugo Villasenor, Bianca Appice, Neville Page, Toryn Reed, Ralis Kahn	Paramount+
2023
2023	The Last of Us	"Infected"	Barrie Gower, Sarah Gower, Paul Spateri, Nelly Guimaras Sanjuan, Johnny Murphy, Joel Hall, Lucy Pittard	HBO
2023	Guillermo del Toro's Cabinet of Curiosities	"Dreams in the Witch House"	Sean Sanson, Shane Zander, Kyle Glencross, Mike Hill, Megan Many	Netflix
2023	House of the Dragon	"The Lord of the Tides"	Barrie Gower, Sarah Gower, Emma Faulkes, Duncan Jarman, Paula Eden	HBO
2023	The Lord of the Rings: The Rings of Power	"Adar"	Jason Docherty, Dan Perry, Mark Knight, Simon Rose	Prime Video
2023	Star Trek: Picard	"The Last Generation"	James Mackinnon, Hugo Villasenor, Bianca Appice, Kevin Wasner, Afton Storton, Kevin Haney, Neville Page, Vincent Van Dyke	Paramount+
2024
2024	Shōgun	"A Dream of a Dream"	Toby Lindala, Bree-Anna Lehto, Suzie Klimack	FX
2024	Ahsoka	"Part Eight: The Jedi, the Witch, and the Warlord"	Alexei Dmitriew, Cristina Waltz, Ana Gabriela Quinonez Urrego, J. Alan Scott, Ian Goodwin, Cale Thomas, Alex Perrone, Scott Stoddard	Disney+
2024	Fallout	"The Beginning"	Jake Garber, Rich Krusell, Lindsay Gelfand, Greg Nicotero, Vincent Van Dyke, Lisa Forst	Prime Video
2024	True Detective: Night Country	"Part 3"	Dave Elsey, Lou Elsey, Brian Kinney	HBO
2024	The Witcher	"The Cost of Chaos"	Mark Coulier, Deb Watson, Stephen Murphy, Josh Weston, Alex Harper	Netflix
2025
2025	The Penguin	"After Hours"	Mike Marino, Michael Fontaine, Crystal Jurado, Diana Choi, Claire Flewin, Jerry Constantine, Yoichi Art Sakamoto, Bobby Diehl	HBO
2025	House of the Dragon	"The Red Sowing"	Waldo Mason, Claire Cameron, Heather McMullen, Emma Faulkes, Hannah Eccleston	HBO
2025	The Last of Us	"Feel Her Love"	Paul Spateri, Barrie Gower, Lucy Pittard, Johnny Murphy, Colum Mangan, Gillian Jarvis, Sarah Pickersgill, Chris Devitt	HBO
2025	The Pitt	"4:00 P.M."	Myriam Arougheti, Thom Floutz, Chris Burgoyne, Martina Sykes	HBO Max
2025	Saturday Night Live	"Host: Timothée Chalamet"	Louie Zakarian, Jason Milani, Amy Tagliamonti, Stephen Kelley, Brandon Grether, Tom Denier Jr., Craig Lindberg	NBC
2026
2026	The Pitt	"9:00 P.M."	Myriam Arougheti, Arjen Tuiten, Thom Floutz, Chris Burgoyne, Martina Sykes, Hanny Tjan	HBO Max
2026	Fallout	"The Demon in the Snow"	Jake Garber, Greg Funk, Gregory Nicotero, Carey Jones, Vincent Van Dyke, Gabriel De Cunto, Kevin Wasner, Scott Stoddard	Prime Video
2026	Monster: The Ed Gein Story	"The Godfather"	Leo Corey Castellano, Mark Nieman, Joseph Badiali	Netflix
2026	Spider-Noir	"Betrayal"	Vincent Van Dyke, Ken Niederbaumer, Gabriel De Cunto, Stephen Prouty, Dave Snyder, Chris Gallaher, Jamie Kelman, Gary J. Tunnicliffe	MGM+ / Prime Video
2026	Stranger Things	"Chapter Four: Sorcerer"	Barrie Gower, Duncan Jarman, Michael Mekash, Emma Faulkes	Netflix

== Programs with multiple wins ==
3 wins

- Game of Thrones

2 wins

- American Horror Story
- Six Feet Under
- The Walking Dead (consecutive)

== Programs with multiple nominations ==
9 nominations

- American Horror Story

8 nominations

- Game of Thrones

6 nominations

- Grey's Anatomy
- Nip/Tuck
- The Walking Dead

4 nominations

- CSI: Crime Scene Investigation
- MADtv
- Star Trek: Enterprise

3 nominations

- Boardwalk Empire
- Penny Dreadful
- Saturday Night Live
- Six Feet Under
- Star Trek: Discovery
- Star Trek: Picard
- Westworld

2 nominations

- American Crime Story
- Fallout
- House of the Dragon
- The Last of Us
- The Mandalorian
- The Pitt
- Pose
- Stranger Things
- Tracey Ullman's State of the Union
