= Make-Up Artists & Hair Stylists Guild Award for Best Special Make-Up Effects in a Feature-Length Motion Picture =

Make-Up Artists and Hair Stylists Guild Award for Best Special Make-Up Effects in a Feature-Length Motion Picture
- Country: United States
- Presented by: Make-Up Artists and Hair Stylists Guild (MUAHS)
- First award: 1999
- Currently held by: Mike Marino, Michael Fontaine, Yoichi Art Sakamoto, Diana Choi; Coming 2 America (2021)
- Website: Make-Up Artists & Hair Stylists Guild

The Make-Up Artists and Hair Stylists Guild Award for Best Special Make-Up Effects in a Feature-Length Motion Picture is one of the awards given annually to people working in the motion picture industry by the Make-Up Artists and Hair Stylists Guild (MUAHS). It is presented to makeup artists who work in Special Effects makeup, or "Prosthetic makeup", whose work has been deemed "best" in a given year. The award was first given in 2000, during the first annual awards, and was given when the awards were brought back in 2014.

== Winners and nominees ==
- "†" indicates Academy Award for Best Makeup and Hairstyling
- "‡" indicates Academy Award nomination for Best Makeup and Hairstyling

=== 1990s ===
Year	Film	Nominees
(1999); 1st
(1999); 1st	Bicentennial Man ‡	Greg Cannom, Wesley Wofford
(1999); 1st	Austin Powers: The Spy Who Shagged Me‡	Michèle Burke, Kenny Myers, Will Huff, Kevin Haney for the characters Austin Powers, Dr. Evil, and Mini-Me
(1999); 1st	Austin Powers: The Spy Who Shagged Me‡	Stan Winston, Mike Smithson for the character Fat Bastard

=== 2000s ===
Year	Film	Nominees
(2000); 2nd
(2000); 2nd	How the Grinch Stole Christmas †	Rick Baker, Toni G, Kazuhiro Tsuji
(2000); 2nd	The Cell ‡	Jake Garber
(2000); 2nd	Nutty Professor II: The Klumps	
(2001); 3rd
(2001); 3rd	Planet of the Apes	Rick Baker, Toni G, Kazuhiro Tsuji
(2001); 3rd	Ali	Mark Garbarino, Nick Marra
(2001); 3rd	Hannibal	Greg Cannom, Wesley Wofford
(2002); 4th
(2002); 4th	The Lord of the Rings: The Two Towers	Gino Acevedo, Jason Docherty, Richard Taylor
(2002); 4th	Frida †	Matthew W. Mungle, Judy Chin, John E. Jackson
(2002); 4th	Harry Potter and the Chamber of Secrets	Amanda Knight, Jane Royle, Clare Le Vesconte
(2003); 5th
(2003); 5th	The Lord of the Rings: The Return of the King †	Gino Acevedo, Jason Docherty, Richard Taylor
(2003); 5th	The Cat in the Hat	Mike Smithson, Steve Johnson, Jamie Kelman
(2003); 5th	X2	Gordon J. Smith, Evan Penny, Jay McClennen

=== 2010s ===
Year	Film	Nominees
(2013); 6th
(2013); 6th	Bad Grandpa ‡	Stephen Prouty, Tony Gardner
(2013); 6th	Hansel & Gretel: Witch Hunters	Mike Elizalde, Lufeng Qu
(2013); 6th	The Hunger Games: Catching Fire	Ve Neill, Nikoletta Skarlatos
(2014); 7th
(2014); 7th	Guardians of the Galaxy ‡	David White
(2014); 7th	Foxcatcher ‡	Bill Corso and Dennis Liddiard
(2014); 7th	The Hobbit: The Battle of the Five Armies	Gino Acevedo
(2014); 7th	Into the Woods	J. Roy Helland, Matthew Smith
(2014); 7th	Maleficent	Rick Baker, Toni G, Arjen Tuiten
(2015); 8th
(2015); 8th	Mad Max: Fury Road †	Damian Martin, Elka Wardega, Jaco Snyman
(2015); 8th	Black Mass	Joel Harlow, Ken Niederbaumer, Khanh Trance
(2015); 8th	Ex Machina	Siân Grigg, Charlotte Rogers, Tristan Versluis
(2015); 8th	The Hunger Games: Mockingjay – Part 2	Ve Neill, Glenn Hetrick
(2015); 8th	Star Wars: The Force Awakens	Neal Scanlan
(2016); 9th
(2016); 9th	Star Trek Beyond ‡	Joel Harlow, Richard Alonzo
(2016); 9th	Deadpool	Bill Corso, Andy Clement
(2016); 9th	Doctor Strange	Jeremy Woodhead
(2016); 9th	Fantastic Beasts and Where to Find Them	Fae Hammond
(2016); 9th	Suicide Squad †	Christopher Nelson, Sean Sansom, Greg Nicotero
(2017); 10th
(2017); 10th	Darkest Hour †	Kazuhiro Tsuji, David Malinowski, Lucy Sibbick
(2017); 10th	Guardians of the Galaxy Vol. 2	John Blake, Brian Sipe
(2017); 10th	The Shape of Water	Mike Hill, Shane Mahan
(2017); 10th	Star Wars: The Last Jedi	Neal Scanlan, Peter King
(2017); 10th	Wonder ‡	Arjen Tuiten, Michael Nickiforek
(2018); 11th
(2018); 11th	Vice †	Greg Cannom, Christopher Gallaher
(2018); 11th	Aquaman	Justin Raleigh, Ozzy Alvarez, Sean Genders
(2018); 11th	The Ballad of Buster Scruggs	Christien Tinsley, Corey Welk, Rolf Keppler
(2018); 11th	Black Panther	Joel Harlow, Ken Diaz, Sian Richards
(2018); 11th	Stan & Ollie	Mark Coulier, Jeremy Woodhead
(2019); 12th
(2019); 12th	Bombshell †	Kazu Hiro, Vivian Baker, Richard Redlefsen
(2019); 12th	Captain Marvel	Brian Sipe, Alexei Dmitriew, Sabrina Wilson
(2019); 12th	The Irishman	Mike Marino, Mike Fontaine, Carla White
(2019); 12th	It Chapter Two	Sean Sansom, Shane Zander, Iantha Goldberg
(2019); 12th	Rocketman	Barrie Gower, Lizzie Yianni Georgiou, Victoria Money

=== 2020s ===
Year	Film	Nominees
(2020); 13th
(2020); 13th	Pinocchio ‡	Mark Coulier
(2020); 13th	Bill & Ted Face the Music	Bill Corso, Kevin Yagher, Steve Wang, Stephen Kelley
(2020); 13th	Hillbilly Elegy ‡	Eryn Krueger Mekash, Matthew Mungle, Jamie Hess
(2020); 13th	Mulan	Denise Kum, Chris Fitzpatrick
(2020); 13th	The United States vs. Billie Holiday	Adrien Morot
(2020); 13th	Wonder Woman 1984	Jan Sewell, Mark Coulier
(2021); 14th
(2021); 14th	Coming 2 America ‡	Mike Marino, Michael Fontaine, Yoichi Art Sakamoto, Diana Choi
(2021); 14th	Dune ‡	Donald Mowat, Love Larson, Eva von Bahr, Rocky Faulkner
(2021); 14th	The Eyes of Tammy Faye †	Justin Raleigh, Kelly Golden, Chris Hampton, Thom Floutz
(2021); 14th	House of Gucci ‡	Göran Lundström, Federica Castelli
(2021); 14th	The Suicide Squad	Shane Mahan, Brian Sipe, Matt Sprunger, Greg Funk
(2022); 15th	The Whale †	Adrien Morot, Kathy Tse, Chris Gallaher
(2022); 15th	The Batman ‡	Michael Marino, Mike Fontaine, Yoichi Art Sakamoto, Göran Lundström
(2022); 15th	Black Panther: Wakanda Forever ‡	Joel Harlow, Kim Felix
(2022); 15th	Elvis ‡	Mark Coulier, Jason Baird, Barrie Gower, Emma Faulkes, Chloe Muton-Phillips
(2023); 16th
(2023); 16th	Maestro ‡	Kazu Hiro, Siân Grigg, Duncan Jarman, Mike Mekash
(2023); 16th	Golda ‡	Karen Thomas, Eva Susanna Johnson Theodosiou
(2023); 16th	Guardians of the Galaxy Vol. 3	Alexei Dmitriew, Lindsay MacGowen, Shane Mahan, Scott Stoddard
(2023); 16th	Poor Things †	Nadia Stacey, Mark Coulier
(2023); 16th	Rebel Moon: Part One – A Child of Fire	Ozzy Alvarez, Justin Raleigh, Kelsey Berk, Jonathan Shroyer
