= 74th Primetime Creative Arts Emmy Awards =

2022 American television programming awards

- Date: September 3–4, 2022
- Location: Microsoft Theater; Los Angeles, California
- Presented by: Academy of Television Arts & Sciences
- Most awards: Adele One Night Only; The Beatles: Get Back; Euphoria; Stranger Things; The White Lotus (5)
- Most nominations: Euphoria; Succession (13)

Television/radio coverage
- Network: FXX
- Produced by: Bob Bain
- Directed by: Jonathan X

The 74th Primetime Creative Arts Emmy Awards honored the best in artistic and technical achievement in American prime time television programming from June 1, 2021, until May 31, 2022, as chosen by the Academy of Television Arts & Sciences. The awards were presented on September 3 and 4, 2022, at the Microsoft Theater in Downtown Los Angeles, California. A total of 99 Creative Arts Emmys were presented across 93 categories. The ceremonies were broadcast in the United States by FXX on September 10.

Adele One Night Only, The Beatles: Get Back, Euphoria, Stranger Things, and The White Lotus each received five awards, leading all programs. Euphoria also tied with Succession for the most nominations, with each receiving 13. Overall program awards went to Adele One Night Only, Arcane, The Beatles: Get Back, Carpool Karaoke: The Series, Chip 'n Dale: Rescue Rangers, Full Frontal with Samantha Bee Presents: Once Upon a Time in Late Night, George Carlin's American Dream, Love, Death & Robots, Love on the Spectrum U.S., The Pepsi Super Bowl LVI Halftime Show, Queer Eye, Stanley Tucci: Searching for Italy, and When Claude Got Shot. HBO and HBO Max led all networks with a combined 26 wins from 93 nominations.

== Winners and nominees ==
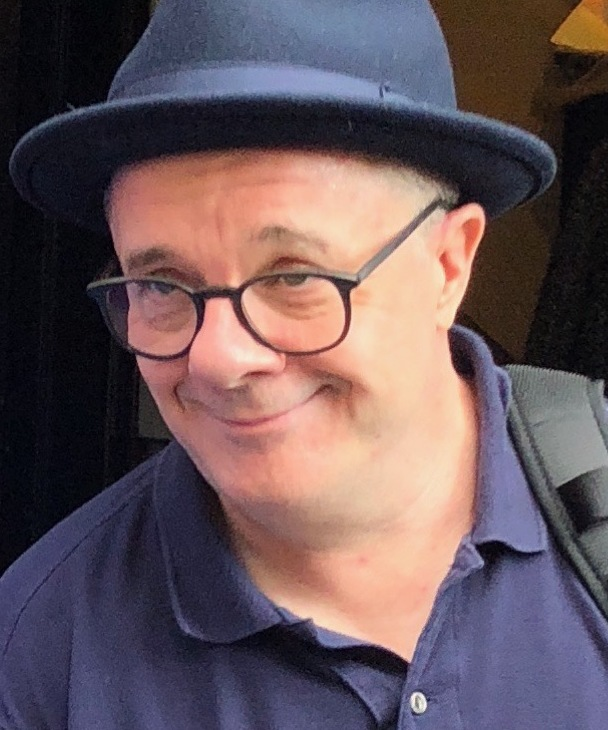
Nathan Lane, Outstanding Guest Actor in a Comedy Series winner

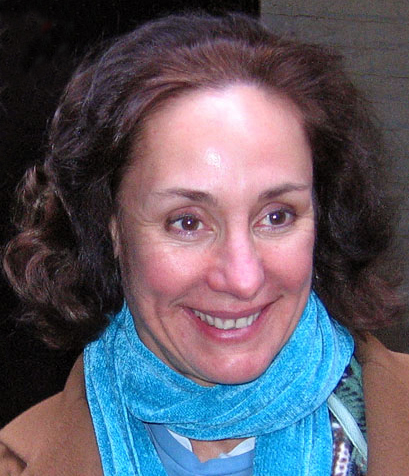
Laurie Metcalf, Outstanding Guest Actress in a Comedy Series winner

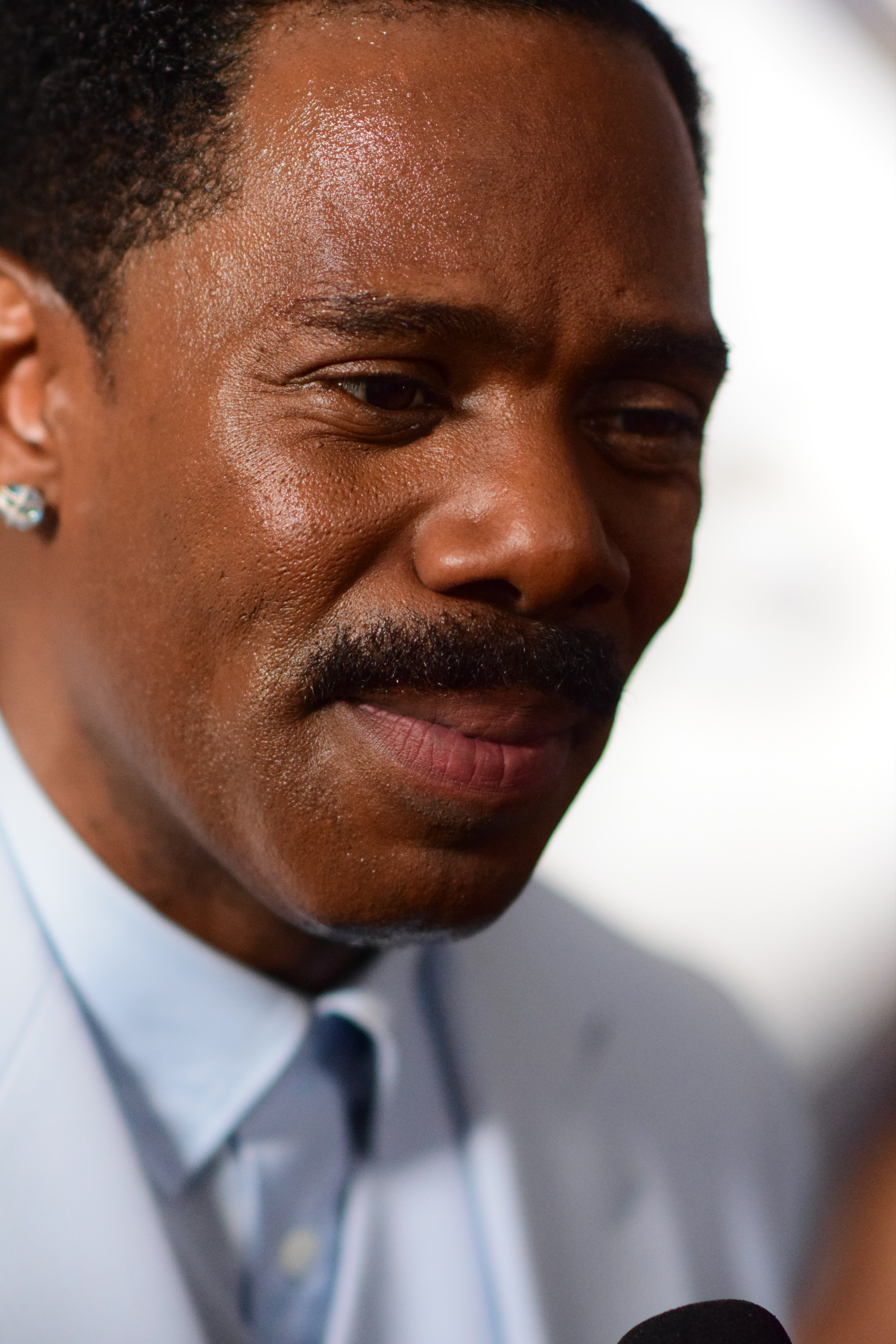
Colman Domingo, Outstanding Guest Actor in a Drama Series winner

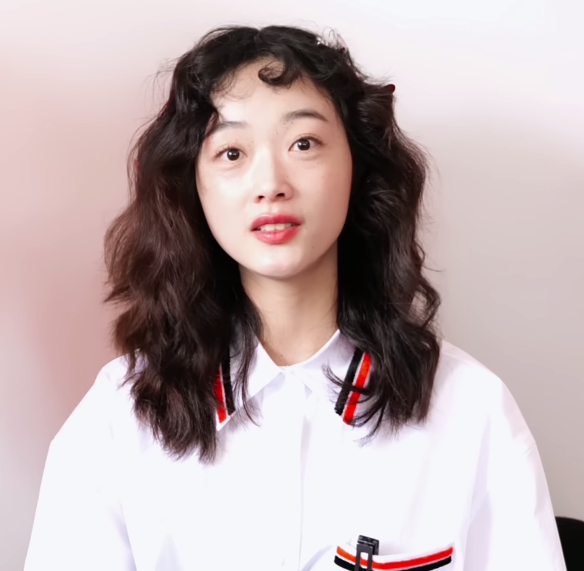
Lee Yoo-mi, Outstanding Guest Actress in a Drama Series winner

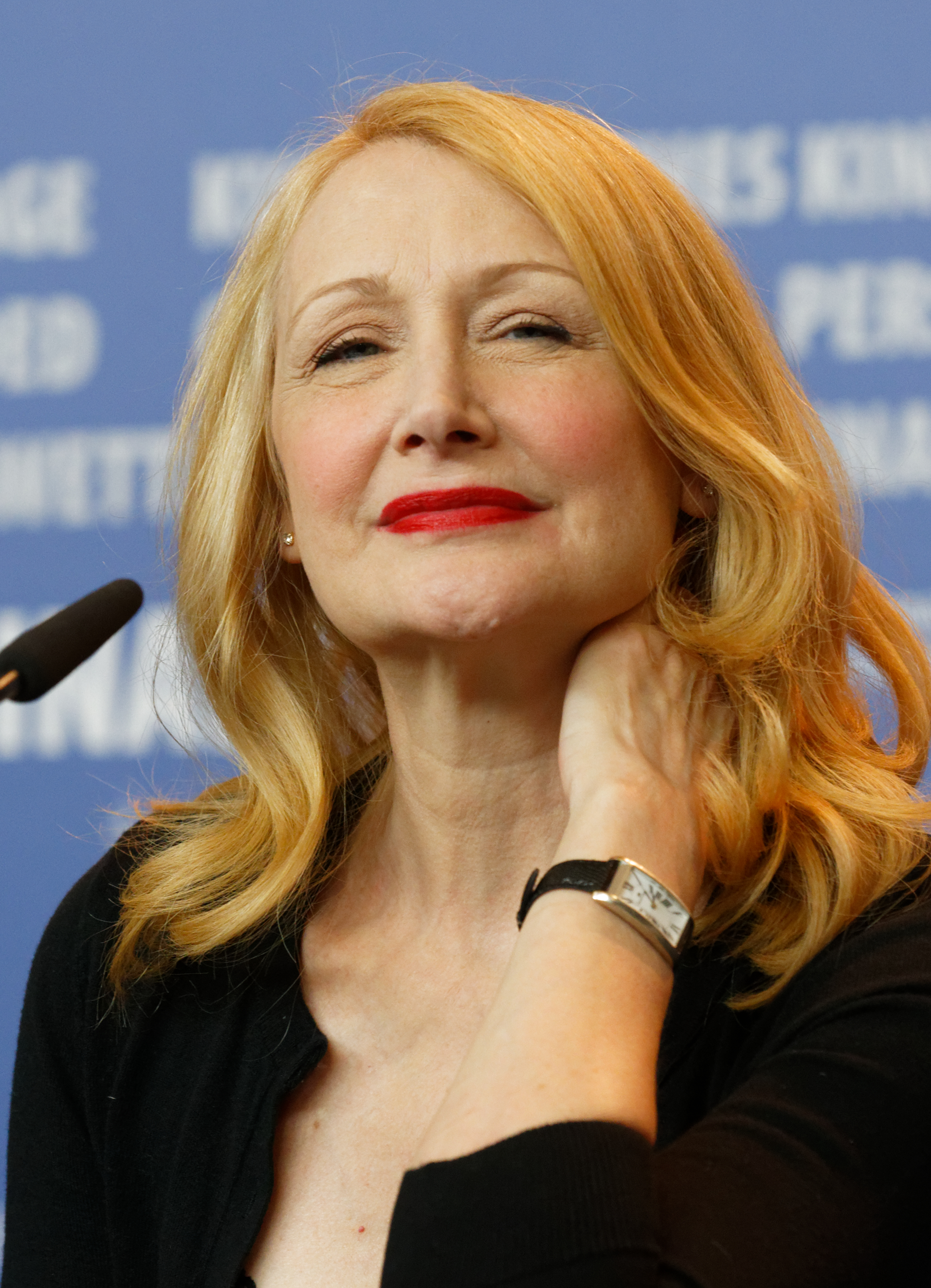
Patricia Clarkson, Outstanding Actress in a Short Form Comedy or Drama Series winner

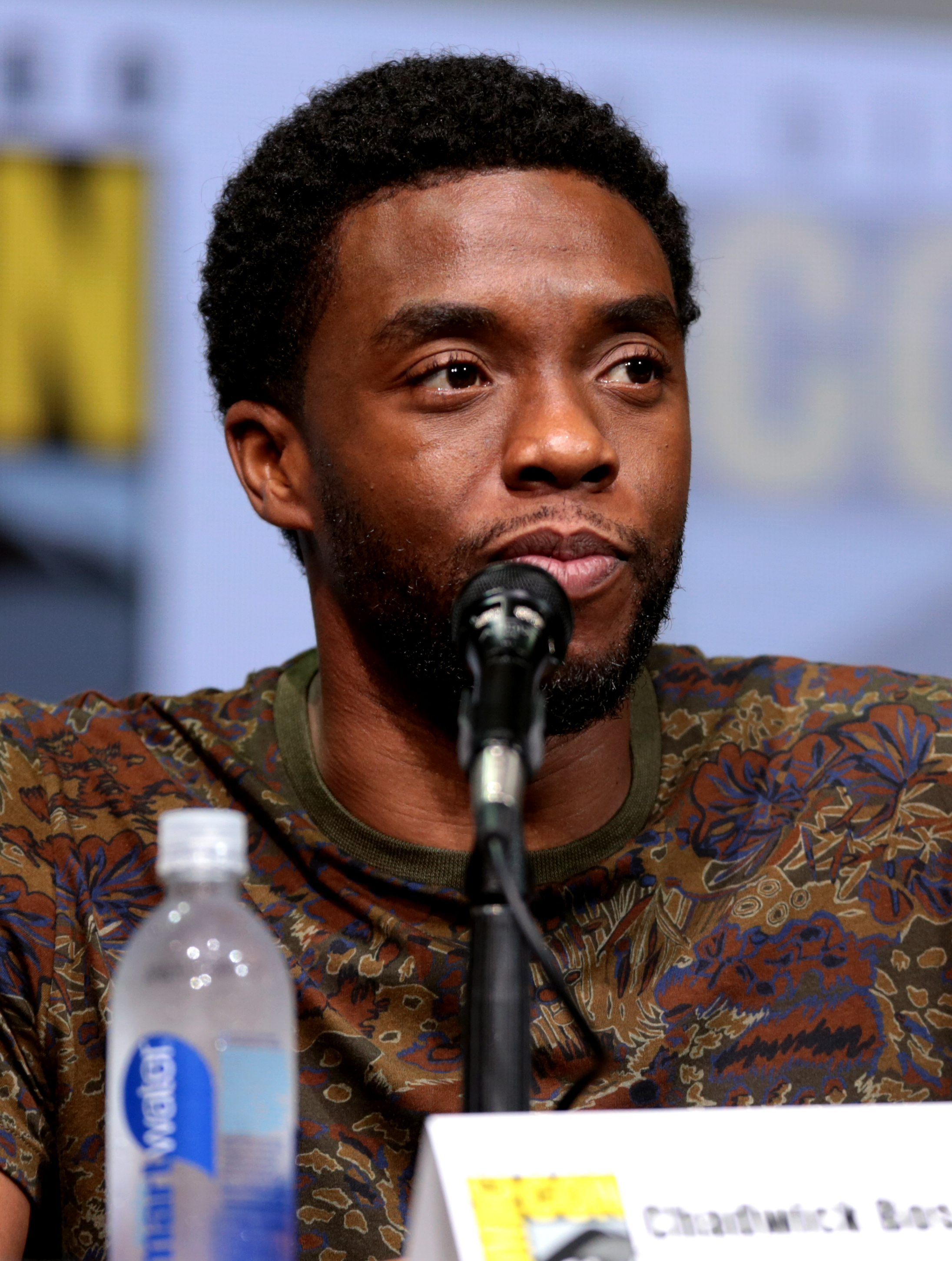
Chadwick Boseman, Outstanding Character Voice-Over Performance winner

Barack Obama, Outstanding Narrator winner

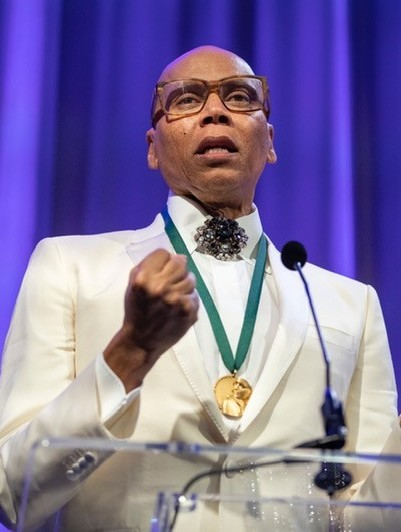
RuPaul, Outstanding Host for a Reality or Competition Program winner

Winners are listed first, highlighted in boldface, and indicated with a double dagger (‡). (Note: The outlets listed for each program are the U.S. broadcasters or streaming services identified in the nominations, which for some international productions are different than the broadcaster(s) that originally commissioned the program. Programs broadcast by HBO or HBO Max were listed under both services in the nominations list; only the original broadcaster is listed below.) Sections are based upon the categories listed in the 2021–2022 Emmy rules and procedures. Area awards and juried awards are denoted next to the category names as applicable. (Note: Area awards are non-competitive; any nominee with at least 90% approval receives an Emmy. If no nominee receives 90% approval, the nominee with the highest approval receives an Emmy; for area awards in picture editing and sound mixing, there is an additional requirement that the highest-rated nominee must have at least 50% approval.; Juried awards generally do not have nominations; instead, all entrants are screened before members of the appropriate peer group, and one, more than one, or no entry is awarded an Emmy based on the jury's vote.) For simplicity, producers who received nominations for program awards have been omitted.

=== Programs ===
Programs
**Outstanding Television Movie**: **Chip 'n Dale: Rescue Rangers** **(Disney+)**‡; Ray Donovan: The Movie (Showtime); Reno 911!: The Hunt for QAnon (Paramount+); The Survivor (HBO); Zoey's Extraordinary Christmas (The Roku Channel)	**Outstanding Variety Special (Live)**: **The Pepsi Super Bowl LVI Halftime Show Starring Dr. Dre, Snoop Dogg, Mary J. Blige, Eminem, Kendrick Lamar and 50 Cent (NBC)**‡; The 64th Annual Grammy Awards (CBS); Live in Front of a Studio Audience: The Facts of Life and Diff'rent Strokes (ABC); The Oscars (ABC); The Tony Awards Present: Broadway's Back! (CBS)
**Outstanding Variety Special (Pre-Recorded)**: **Adele One Night Only (CBS)**‡; Dave Chappelle: The Closer (Netflix); Harry Potter 20th Anniversary: Return to Hogwarts (HBO Max); Norm Macdonald: Nothing Special (Netflix); One Last Time: An Evening with Tony Bennett and Lady Gaga (CBS)	**Outstanding Animated Program**: **Arcane: "When These Walls Come Tumbling Down" (Netflix)**‡; Bob's Burgers: "Some Like It Bot Part 1: Eighth Grade Runner" (Fox); Rick and Morty: "Mort Dinner Rick Andre" (Adult Swim); The Simpsons: "Pixelated and Afraid" (Fox); What If...?: "What If... Doctor Strange Lost His Heart Instead of His Hands?" (Disney+)
**Outstanding Structured Reality Program**: **Queer Eye (Netflix)**‡; Antiques Roadshow (PBS); Fixer Upper: Welcome Home (Magnolia Network); Love Is Blind (Netflix); Shark Tank (ABC)	**Outstanding Unstructured Reality Program**: **Love on the Spectrum U.S. (Netflix)**‡; Below Deck Mediterranean (Bravo); Cheer (Netflix); RuPaul's Drag Race: Untucked (VH1); Selling Sunset (Netflix)
**Outstanding Documentary or Nonfiction Series (Area)**: **The Beatles: Get Back (Disney+)**‡; The Andy Warhol Diaries (Netflix); jeen-yuhs: A Kanye Trilogy (Netflix); 100 Foot Wave (HBO); We Need to Talk About Cosby (Showtime)	**Outstanding Documentary or Nonfiction Special (Area)**: **George Carlin's American Dream (HBO)**‡; Controlling Britney Spears (New York Times Presents) (FX); Lucy and Desi (Prime Video); The Tinder Swindler (Netflix); We Feed People (Disney+)
**Outstanding Hosted Nonfiction Series or Special (Area)**: **Stanley Tucci: Searching for Italy (CNN)**‡; My Next Guest Needs No Introduction with David Letterman (Netflix); The Problem with Jon Stewart (Apple TV+); Vice (Showtime); The World According to Jeff Goldblum (Disney+)	**Exceptional Merit in Documentary Filmmaking (Juried)**: **When Claude Got Shot (PBS)**‡; Changing the Game (Hulu); Frederick Douglass: In Five Speeches (HBO)
**Outstanding Short Form Comedy, Drama or Variety Series**: **Carpool Karaoke: The Series (Apple TV+)**‡; I Think You Should Leave with Tim Robinson (Netflix); Late Night with Seth Meyers CORRECTIONS (YouTube); The Randy Rainbow Show (YouTube); Stephen Colbert Presents Tooning Out the News (Paramount+)	**Outstanding Short Form Nonfiction or Reality Series**: **Full Frontal with Samantha Bee Presents: Once Upon a Time in Late Night (TBS)**‡; Between the Scenes — The Daily Show (YouTube); RuPaul's Drag Race Whatcha Packin' with Michelle Visage (VH1); Saturday Night Live Presents: Stories from the Show (NBC); Top Chef: Last Chance Kitchen (Bravo)
**Outstanding Short Form Animated Program**: **Love, Death & Robots: "Jibaro" (Netflix)**‡; The Boys Presents: Diabolical: "John and Sun-Hee" (Prime Video); Robot Chicken: "Happy Russian Deathdog Dolloween 2 U" (Adult Swim); Star Wars: Visions: "The Duel" (Disney+); When Billie Met Lisa (Disney+)

=== Performing ===
Performing
**Outstanding Guest Actor in a Comedy Series**: **Nathan Lane – Only Murders in the Building: "The Boy from 6B" as Teddy Dimas (Hulu)**‡; Jerrod Carmichael – Saturday Night Live: "Host: Jerrod Carmichael" as host (NBC); Bill Hader – Curb Your Enthusiasm: "Igor, Gregor, & Timor" as Igor/Gregor/Timor (HBO); James Lance – Ted Lasso: "Inverting the Pyramid of Success" as Trent Crimm (Apple TV+); Christopher McDonald – Hacks: "The One, the Only" as Marty (HBO Max); Sam Richardson – Ted Lasso: "Midnight Train to Royston" as Edwin Akufo (Apple TV+)	**Outstanding Guest Actress in a Comedy Series**: **Laurie Metcalf – Hacks: "Trust the Process" as Weed (HBO Max)**‡; Jane Adams – Hacks: "The Click" as Nina Daniels (HBO Max); Harriet Sansom Harris – Hacks: "Retired" as Susan (HBO Max); Jane Lynch – Only Murders in the Building: "Double Time" as Sazz Pataki (Hulu); Kaitlin Olson – Hacks: "There Will Be Blood" as DJ (HBO Max); Harriet Walter – Ted Lasso: "The Signal" as Deborah (Apple TV+)
**Outstanding Guest Actor in a Drama Series**: **Colman Domingo – Euphoria: "Ruminations: Big and Little Bullys" as Ali Muhamand (HBO)**‡; Adrien Brody – Succession: "Lion in the Meadow" as Josh Aaronson (HBO); James Cromwell – Succession: "Retired Janitors of Idaho" as Ewan Roy (HBO); Arian Moayed – Succession: "Retired Janitors of Idaho" as Stewy Hosseini (HBO); Tom Pelphrey – Ozark: "You're the Boss" as Ben Davis (Netflix); Alexander Skarsgård – Succession: "All the Bells Say" as Lukas Matsson (HBO)	**Outstanding Guest Actress in a Drama Series**: **Lee Yoo-mi – Squid Game: "Gganbu" as Ji-yeong (Netflix)**‡; Hope Davis – Succession: "Retired Janitors of Idaho" as Sandi Furness (HBO); Marcia Gay Harden – The Morning Show: "Testimony" as Maggie Brener (Apple TV+); Martha Kelly – Euphoria: "Stand Still Like the Hummingbird" as Laurie (HBO); Sanaa Lathan – Succession: "What It Takes" as Lisa Arthur (HBO); Harriet Walter – Succession: "Chiantishire" as Lady Caroline Collingwood (HBO)
**Outstanding Actor in a Short Form Comedy or Drama Series**: **Tim Robinson – I Think You Should Leave with Tim Robinson: "They said that to me at a dinner." as various characters (Netflix)**‡; Anthony A. Anderson – Anacostia: "Secrets, Lies & Rollercoaster Rides" as Sean Williams-Grey (YouTube); Bill Burr – Bill Burr Presents Immoral Compass: "Part 10: Closure" as Rick (The Roku Channel); Brendan Gleeson – State of the Union: "Kopi Luwak" as Scott (Sundance TV); Ikechukwu Ufomadu – Words with Ike (Cake): "Gubbins" as Ikechukwu Ufomadu (FX)	**Outstanding Actress in a Short Form Comedy or Drama Series**: **Patricia Clarkson – State of the Union: "Kopi Luwak" as Ellen (Sundance TV)**‡; Jacinte Blankenship – Intersection: "Generational Wealth" as Jenaya (YouTube); Desi Lydic – Desi Lydic Foxsplains: "Desi Lydic Foxsplains: Vaccine Mandates" as Desi Lydic (YouTube); Rhea Seehorn – Cooper's Bar: "Episode 106" as Kris Latimer (AMC.com); Sydnee Washington – Bridesman as Judith (YouTube)
**Outstanding Character Voice-Over Performance**: **Chadwick Boseman – What If...?: "What If... T'Challa Became a Star-Lord?" as Star Lord T'Challa (Disney+)**‡; F. Murray Abraham – Moon Knight: "The Friendly Type" as Khonshu (Disney+); Julie Andrews – Bridgerton: "Capital R Rake" as Lady Whistledown (Netflix); Maya Rudolph – Big Mouth: "A Very Big Mouth Christmas" as Connie the Hormone Monstress (Netflix); Stanley Tucci – Central Park: "Central Dark" as Bitsy (Apple TV+); Jessica Walter – Archer: "London Time" as Malory Archer (FX); Jeffrey Wright – What If...?: "What If... Ultron Won?" as the Watcher (Disney+)	**Outstanding Narrator**: **Barack Obama – Our Great National Parks: "A World of Wonder" (Netflix)**‡; Kareem Abdul-Jabbar – Black Patriots: Heroes of the Civil War (History); David Attenborough – The Mating Game: "In Plain Sight" (Discovery+); W. Kamau Bell – We Need to Talk About Cosby: "Part 1" (Showtime); Lupita Nyong'o – Serengeti II: "Intrigue" (Discovery+)
**Outstanding Host for a Reality or Competition Program**: **RuPaul – RuPaul's Drag Race (VH1)**‡; Bobby Berk, Karamo Brown, Tan France, Antoni Porowski, and Jonathan Van Ness – Queer Eye (Netflix); Nicole Byer – Nailed It! (Netflix); Mark Cuban, Barbara Corcoran, Lori Greiner, Robert Herjavec, Daymond John, and Kevin O'Leary – Shark Tank (ABC); Padma Lakshmi – Top Chef (Bravo); Amy Poehler and Nick Offerman – Making It (NBC)

=== Animation ===
Animation
**Outstanding Individual Achievement in Animation (Juried)**
- **Arcane: "The Boy Savior" – Anne-Laure To (Netflix)**‡
- **Arcane: "Happy Progress Day!" – Julien Georgel (Netflix)**‡
- **Arcane: "When These Walls Come Tumbling Down" – Bruno Couchinho (Netflix)**‡
- **The Boys Presents: Diabolical: "Boyd in 3D" – Lexy Naut (Prime Video)**‡
- **The House – Kecy Salangad (Netflix)**‡
- **Love, Death & Robots: "Jibaro" – Alberto Mielgo (Netflix)**‡

=== Art Direction ===
Art Direction
**Outstanding Production Design for a Narrative Contemporary Program (One Hour or More) (Area)**: **Squid Game: "Gganbu" – Chae Kyoung-sun, Gim En-jee, and Kim Jeong-gon (Netflix)**‡; The Flight Attendant: "Seeing Double" – Nina Ruscio, Josh Lusby, Mari Lappalainen, and Matt Callahan (HBO Max); Ozark: "The Beginning of the End" / "Let the Great World Spin" / "Sanctified" – David Bomba, Sean Ryan Jennings, and Kim Leoleis (Netflix); Severance: "Good News About Hell" – Jeremy Hindle, Nick Francone, Angelica Borrero-Fortier, and Andrew Baseman (Apple TV+); Succession: "Too Much Birthday" – Stephen H. Carter, Marci Mudd, and George DeTitta Jr. (HBO); The White Lotus – Laura Fox, Charles Varga, and Jennifer Lukehart (HBO)	**Outstanding Production Design for a Narrative Period or Fantasy Program (One Hour or More) (Area)**: **The Gilded Age: "Never the New" – Bob Shaw, Larry Brown, Laura Ballinger Gardner, and Regina Graves (HBO)**‡; The Great: "Wedding" – Francesca di Mottola, Emma Painter, and Monica Alberte (Hulu); Loki: "Glorious Purpose" – Kasra Farahani, Natasha Gerasimova, and Claudia Bonfe (Disney+); The Marvelous Mrs. Maisel: "Maisel vs. Lennon: The Cut Contest" / "How Do You Get to Carnegie Hall?" – Bill Groom, Neil Prince, and Ellen Christiansen (Prime Video); Stranger Things: "Chapter Seven: The Massacre at Hawkins Lab" – Chris Trujillo, Sean Brennan, and Jess Royal (Netflix)
**Outstanding Production Design for a Narrative Program (Half-Hour) (Area)**: **Only Murders in the Building: "True Crime" – Curt Beech, Jordan Jacobs, and Rich Murray (Hulu)**‡; Bob Hearts Abishola: "Bowango" – Francoise Cherry-Cohen, Gail L. Russell, and Ann Shea (CBS); Emily in Paris: "The Cook, the Thief, Her Ghost and His Lover" / "Scents & Sensibility" / "French Revolution" – Anne Seibel, Benôit Tételin, and Christelle Maisonneuve (Netflix); Hacks: "Trust the Process" – Alec Contestabile, Rob Tokarz, and Jennifer Lukehart (HBO Max); Schmigadoon!: "Schmigadoon!" – Bo Welch, Don Macaulay, and Carol Lavallee (Apple TV+); Ted Lasso: "Beard After Hours" – Paul Cripps, Stacey Dickinson, and Kate Goodman (Apple TV+); United States of Al: "Kiss/Maach" / "Divorce/Talaq" / "Sock/Jeraab" – Daren Janes and Susan Mina Eschelbach (CBS)	**Outstanding Production Design for a Variety, Reality or Competition Series (Area)**: **RuPaul's Drag Race: "Catwalk" – Gianna Costa and Allison Spain (VH1)**‡; A Black Lady Sketch Show: "Anybody Have Something I Can Flog Myself With?" – Cindy Chao, Michele Yu, and Lizzie Boyle (HBO); The Late Show with Stephen Colbert: "Colbert's 'Lord of the Rings' Rap Celebrates 20 Years of the Greatest Trilogy in Movie History" – Jim Fenhagen, Larry Hartman, Brendan Hurley, and Riley Mellon (CBS); Queer Eye: "Angel Gets Her Wings" – Thomas Rouse and Josh Smith (Netflix); Saturday Night Live: "Host: Kim Kardashian" – Eugene Lee, Akira Yoshimura, Keith Ian Raywood, N. Joseph DeTullio, and Melissa Shakun (NBC)
**Outstanding Production Design for a Variety Special (Area)**: **The Pepsi Super Bowl LVI Halftime Show Starring Dr. Dre, Snoop Dogg, Mary J. Blige, Eminem, Kendrick Lamar and 50 Cent – Bruce Rodgers, Shelley Rodgers, and Maria Garcia (NBC)**‡; The 64th Annual Grammy Awards – Julio Himede and Kristen Merlino (CBS); Live in Front of a Studio Audience: The Facts of Life and Diff'rent Strokes – Stephan Olson, Raf Lydon, and Jerie Kelter (ABC); The Oscars – David Korins and Margaux Lapresle (ABC); Savage X Fenty Show Vol. 3 – Willo Perron, Steve Morden, and Marc Manabat (Prime Video)

=== Casting ===
Casting
**Outstanding Casting for a Comedy Series**: **Abbott Elementary – Wendy O'Brien (ABC)**‡; Barry – Sherry Thomas and Sharon Bialy (HBO); Curb Your Enthusiasm – Allison Jones and Ben Harris (HBO); Hacks – Jeanne McCarthy and Nicole Abellera Hallman (HBO Max); Only Murders in the Building – Bernard Telsey and Tiffany Little Canfield (Hulu); Ted Lasso – Theo Park (Apple TV+)	**Outstanding Casting for a Drama Series**: **Succession – Avy Kaufman and Francine Maisler (HBO)**‡; Euphoria – Jessica Kelly, Mary Vernieu, Bret Howe, and Jennifer Venditti (HBO); Ozark – Alexa L. Fogel, Tara Feldstein Bennett, and Chase Paris (Netflix); Severance – Rachel Tenner and Bess Fifer (Apple TV+); Stranger Things – Carmen Cuba, Tara Feldstein Bennett, and Chase Paris (Netflix); Yellowjackets – Junie Lowry Johnson, Libby Goldstein, Corinne Clark, and Jennifer Page (Showtime)
**Outstanding Casting for a Limited or Anthology Series or Movie**: **The White Lotus – Meredith Tucker and Katie Doyle (HBO)**‡; Dopesick – Avy Kaufman and Erica Arvold (Hulu); The Dropout – Jeanie Bacharach, Mark Rutman, and Alison Goodman (Hulu); Inventing Anna – Linda Lowy, Jamie Castro, Allison Estrin, Henry Russell Bergstein, Juliette Ménager, Simone Bär, and Alexandra Montag (Netflix); Pam & Tommy – Mary Vernieu and Lindsay Graham Ahanonu (Hulu)	**Outstanding Casting for a Reality Program**: **Love on the Spectrum U.S. – Laura Ritchie, Kat Elmore, and Jeffrey Marx (Netflix)**‡; Lizzo's Watch Out for the Big Grrrls – Lynne Spillman, Blair Kim, and Jazzy Collins (Prime Video); Queer Eye – Jessica Jorgensen, Natalie Pino, and Quinn Fegan (Netflix); RuPaul's Drag Race – Goloka Bolte and Ethan Petersen (VH1); Top Chef – Samantha Hanks and Ron Mare (Bravo)

=== Choreography ===
Choreography
**Outstanding Choreography for Variety or Reality Programming (Juried)**: **Savage X Fenty Show Vol. 3: "Opening" – Parris Goebel (Prime Video)**‡; Annie Live!: "Hard Knock Life" / "We Got Annie" / "NYC" – Sergio Trujillo (NBC); Dancing with the Stars: "I Got 5 on It" / "Dark Fantasy" – Daniella Karagach (ABC); The Oscars: "Be Alive" – Fatima Robinson (ABC); Step Into... The Movies with Derek and Julianne Hough: "Moulin Rouge 'Roxanne'" – Tessandra Chavez and Derek Hough (ABC)	**Outstanding Choreography for Scripted Programming (Juried)**: **Euphoria: "Call Me Irresponsible" / "Holding Out for a Hero" / "Cheerleader" – Ryan Heffington (HBO)**‡; Goliath: "The Pain Killer" – Fred Tallaksen (Prime Video); The Porter: "Opening Stardust Dance Number" / "Willie Johnson Dance Number" / "Lucy's Featured Performance" / "Songbird" – Christian Vincent (BET+); Schmigadoon!: "Corn Puddin'" / "Tribulation" / "With All of Your Heart" – Christopher Gattelli (Apple TV+); Zoey's Extraordinary Christmas: "It's the Most Wonderful Time of the Year" / "We Need a Little Christmas" / "Just the Two of Us" – Mandy Moore and Jillian Meyers (The Roku Channel)

=== Cinematography ===
Cinematography
**Outstanding Cinematography for a Multi-Camera Series**: **How I Met Your Father: "Pilot" – Gary Baum (Hulu)**‡; B Positive: "Dagobah, a Room, and a Chimney Sweep" – Steven V. Silver (CBS); The Conners: "The Wedding of Dan and Louise" – Donald A. Morgan (ABC)	**Outstanding Cinematography for a Single-Camera Series (Half-Hour)**: **Atlanta: "Three Slaps" – Christian Sprenger (FX)**‡; Barry: "starting now" – Carl Herse (HBO); Grown-ish: "Put Your Hands Where My Eyes Could See" – Mark Doering-Powell (Freeform); Hacks: "The Click" – Adam Bricker (HBO Max); Insecure: "Reunited, Okay?!" – Ava Berkofsky (HBO); Russian Doll: "Nowhen" – Ula Pontikos (Netflix)
**Outstanding Cinematography for a Single-Camera Series (One Hour)**: **Euphoria: "The Theater and Its Double" – Marcell Rév (HBO)**‡; Loki: "Lamentis" – Autumn Durald Arkapaw (Disney+); The Marvelous Mrs. Maisel: "How Do You Get to Carnegie Hall?" – M. David Mullen (Prime Video); Ozark: "A Hard Way to Go" – Eric Koretz (Netflix); Squid Game: "Stick to the Team" – Lee Hyung-deok (Netflix); Winning Time: The Rise of the Lakers Dynasty: "Pieces of a Man" – Todd Banhazl (HBO)	**Outstanding Cinematography for a Limited or Anthology Series or Movie**: **Dopesick: "Breakthrough Pain" – Checco Varese (Hulu)**‡; 1883: "1883" – Ben Richardson (Paramount+); 1883: "Lightning Yellow Hair" – Christina Alexandra Voros (Paramount+); Gaslit: "Will" – Larkin Seiple (Starz); Moon Knight: "Asylum" – Gregory Middleton (Disney+); Station Eleven: "Wheel of Fire" – Christian Sprenger (HBO Max)
**Outstanding Cinematography for a Nonfiction Program**: **100 Foot Wave: "Chapter IV – Dancing with God" – Mike Prickett and Laurent Pujol (HBO)**‡; The Andy Warhol Diaries: "Collab: Andy & Basquiat" – Wolfgang Held (Netflix); McCartney 3,2,1: "These Things Bring You Together" – Stuart Winecoff (Hulu); Our Great National Parks: "Chilean Patagonia" – Christiaan Muñoz-Salas and Ignacio Walker (Netflix); Stanley Tucci: Searching for Italy: "Venice" – Andrew Muggleton (CNN); We Feed People – Kris Kaczor, Sebastian Lindstrom, and Alicia Sully (Disney+)	**Outstanding Cinematography for a Reality Program**: **Life Below Zero: "Fire in the Sky" – Danny Day, Michael Cheeseman, and Simeon Houtman (National Geographic)**‡; The Amazing Race – Josh Gitersonke, Joshua Argue, Kathryn Barrows, Marc Bennett, Denise Borders, Petr Cikhart, Dave D'Angelo, Chris Ellison, Adam Haisinger, Kevin R. Johnson, Daniel Long, and Jeff Philips (CBS); Deadliest Catch – David Reichert, Bryan Miller, Kelvon Agee, Charlie Beck, Todd Stanley, Dave Arnold, Nathan Garofalos, Shane Moore, Randy Lee, Jacob Tawney, Sam Henderson, Carson Doyle, and Antonio Baca (Discovery Channel); Lizzo's Watch Out for the Big Grrrls: "HBCYou Band" – Michael Jacob Kerber (Prime Video); RuPaul's Drag Race – Michael Jacob Kerber, Jay Mack Arnette II, Jason Cooley, Pauline Edwards, Mario Panagiotopoulos, Brett Smith, Jeremiah Smith, Justin Umphenour, and Jon Schneider (VH1); Survivor – Scott Duncan, Peter Wery, Russ Fill, Christopher Barker, Granger Scholtz, Josh Bartel, Marc Bennett, Paulo Castillo, Rodney Chauvin, Chris Ellison, Glenn Louis Evans, David J. Frederick, Ben Gamble, Kevin B. Garrison, Nixon George, Matthias Hoffmann, Toby Hogan, Efrain "Mofi" Laguna, Jeff Phillips, Louis Powell, Erick G. Sarmiento, Dirk Steyn, John Tattersall, Holly Tompson, Paulo Velozo, Ryan Hermosura, and Cullum Andrews (CBS)

=== Commercial ===
Commercial
**Outstanding Commercial**
- **"Teenage Dream" – Smuggler and BBDO New York (Sandy Hook Promise)**‡
  - "Detectives" – O Positive and Apple (Apple iPhone 13 Pro)
  - "Everyone But Jon Hamm" – Hungry Man Productions and Media Arts Lab (Apple TV+)
  - "The Lost Class" – Hungry Man Productions and Leo Burnett Chicago (Change the Ref)
  - "Skate Nation Ghana" – Love Song and Droga5 (Meta)
  - "Walter the Cat" – O Positive and Commonwealth//McCann (Chevy Silverado)

=== Costumes ===
Costumes
**Outstanding Period Costumes (Area)**: **The Great: "Seven Days" – Sharon Long, Viveene Campbell, Anna Cavaliere, and Bobbie Edwards (Hulu)**‡; Angelyne: "Glow in the Dark Queen of the Universe" – Danny Glicker, Jessica Fasman, and Adam Girardet (Peacock); Bridgerton: "Harmony" – Sophie Canale, Dougie Hawkes, Sarah June Mills, Charlotte Armstrong, Sanaz Missaghian, and Kevin Pratten-Stone (Netflix); The First Lady: "Cracked Pot" – Signe Sejlund, Felicia Jarvis, Matthew Hemesath, Paula Truman, Stephen Oh, and Jessica Trejos (Showtime); The Marvelous Mrs. Maisel: "Maisel vs. Lennon: The Cut Contest" – Donna Zakowska, Moria Sine Clinton, Ben Philipp, Ginnie Patton, Dan Hicks, and Mikita Thompson (Prime Video)	**Outstanding Fantasy/Sci-Fi Costumes (Area)**: **What We Do in the Shadows: "The Wellness Center" – Laura Montgomery, Judy Laukkanen, and Barbara Cardoso (FX)**‡; The Book of Boba Fett: "Chapter 1: Stranger in a Strange Land" – Shawna Trpcic, Julie Robar, and Areayl Cooper (Disney+); Loki: "Glorious Purpose" – Christine Wada, Nora Pedersen, Tamsin Costello, and Carol Beadle (Disney+); Moon Knight: "Gods and Monsters" – Meghan Kasperlik, Martin Mandeville, Richard Davies, and Wilberth Gonzalez (Disney+); Star Trek: Picard: "Penance" – Christine Bieselin Clark, Mitchell Ray Kenney, and Allison Agler (Paramount+); The Witcher: "Family" – Lucinda Wright and Rebecca Jempson (Netflix)
**Outstanding Contemporary Costumes (Area)**: **Hacks: "The Captain's Wife" – Kathleen Felix-Hager and Karen Bellamy (HBO Max)**‡; Black-ish: "That's What Friends Are For" – Michelle R. Cole, Stanley Vance Hudson, and Suzanne M. Bantit (ABC); Euphoria: "Trying to Get to Heaven Before They Close the Door" – Heidi Bivens, Devon Patterson, and Angelina Vitto (HBO); Only Murders in the Building: "Who Is Tim Kono?" – Dana Covarrubias, Amanda Bujak, and Amy Burt (Hulu); Pam & Tommy: "Destroyer of Worlds" – Kameron Lennox, Danielle Baker, and Petra Larsen (Hulu); The White Lotus: "Arrivals" – Alex Bovaird, Brian Sprouse, and Eileen Stroup (HBO)	**Outstanding Costumes for Variety, Nonfiction, or Reality Programming (Juried)**: **We're Here: "Evansville, Indiana" – Casey Caldwell, Diego Montoya, Joshua "Domino" Schwartz, Marco Marco, and Patryq Howell (HBO)**‡

=== Directing ===
Directing
**Outstanding Directing for a Variety Series**: **A Black Lady Sketch Show: "Save My Edges, I'm a Donor!" – Bridget Stokes (HBO)**‡; Last Week Tonight with John Oliver: "Union Busting" – Paul Pennolino and Christopher Werner (HBO); Late Night with Seth Meyers: "Episode 1252" – Alexander J. Vietmeier (NBC); The Late Show with Stephen Colbert: "Artistic Musical Performance by Chance the Rapper; Monologue: Ukraine & Russian War, January 6 Committee Evidence on Trump & Donald Jr.; Guest Beanie Feldstein" – Jim Hoskinson (CBS); Saturday Night Live: "Host: Billie Eilish" – Don Roy King and Liz Patrick (NBC)	**Outstanding Directing for a Variety Special**: **Adele One Night Only – Paul Dugdale (CBS)**‡; Dave Chappelle: The Closer – Stan Lathan (Netflix); Jerrod Carmichael: Rothaniel – Bo Burnham (HBO); Norm Macdonald: Nothing Special – Norm Macdonald and Jeff Tomsic (Netflix); The Pepsi Super Bowl LVI Halftime Show Starring Dr. Dre, Snoop Dogg, Mary J. Blige, Eminem, Kendrick Lamar and 50 Cent – Hamish Hamilton (NBC)
**Outstanding Directing for a Documentary/Nonfiction Program**: **The Beatles: Get Back: "Part 3: Days 17–22" – Peter Jackson (Disney+)**‡; The Andy Warhol Diaries: "Shadows: Andy & Jed" – Andrew Rossi (Netflix); George Carlin's American Dream – Judd Apatow and Michael Bonfiglio (HBO); Lucy and Desi – Amy Poehler (Prime Video); Stanley Tucci: Searching for Italy: "Venice" – Ian Denyer (CNN); We Need to Talk About Cosby: "Part 1" – W. Kamau Bell (Showtime)	**Outstanding Directing for a Reality Program**: **Lizzo's Watch Out for the Big Grrrls: "Naked" – Nneka Onuorah (Prime Video)**‡; Cheer: "Daytona Pt. 2: If the Judges Disagree" – Greg Whiteley (Netflix); Queer Eye: "Angel Gets Her Wings" – Aaron Krummel (Netflix); RuPaul's Drag Race: "Moulin Ru: The Rusical" – Nick Murray (VH1); Top Chef: "Freedmen's Town" – Ari Boles (Bravo)

=== Hairstyling ===
Hairstyling
**Outstanding Contemporary Hairstyling**: **Impeachment: American Crime Story: "The Assassination of Monica Lewinsky" – Natalie Driscoll, Nanxy Tong-Heater, Michelle Ceglia, Suzy Mazzarese Allison, Lauren Kress, and Leighann Pitchon (FX)**‡; American Horror Stories: "Game Over" – Valerie Jackson, Lauren Poole, Roma Goddard, and Allie Keck (FX on Hulu); Black-ish: "That's What Friends Are For" – Nena Ross Davis, Debra Brown, Stacey Morris, Shirlena Allen, Dominique Evans, and Lionel Brown (ABC); Euphoria: "The Theater and Its Double" – Kimberly Kimble, Kendra Garvey, Patricia Vecchio, and Teresita Mariscal (HBO); Hacks: "The Captain's Wife" – Jennifer Bell (HBO Max); Ted Lasso: "No Weddings and a Funeral" – Nicky Austin and Nicola Springall (Apple TV+)	**Outstanding Period and/or Character Hairstyling (Area)**: **Bridgerton: "The Viscount Who Loved Me" – Erika Okvist, Jenny Rhodes-McLean, and Sim Camps (Netflix)**‡; The First Lady: "See Saw" – Colleen LaBaff, Louisa Anthony, Lawrence Davis, Julie Kendrick, Robert Wilson, Jamika Wilson, Evelyn Roach, and Jaime Leigh McIntosh (Showtime); The Marvelous Mrs. Maisel: "How Do You Get to Carnegie Hall?" – Kimberley Spiteri, Barbara Dally, and Daniel Koye (Prime Video); Pam & Tommy: "Jane Fonda" – Barry Lee Moe, Erica Adams, George Guzman, and Helena Cepeda (Hulu); Stranger Things: "Chapter Seven: The Massacre at Hawkins Lab" – Sarah Hindsgaul, Katrina Suhre, Brynn Berg, Dena Gibson, Jamie Freeman, Tariq Nevar, Chase Heard, and Charles Grico (Netflix)
**Outstanding Hairstyling for a Variety, Nonfiction or Reality Program (Juried)**: **Annie Live! – Mia Neal and Leah Loukas (NBC)**‡

=== Lighting Design / Lighting Direction ===
Lighting Design and Lighting Direction
**Outstanding Lighting Design / Lighting Direction for a Variety Series (Area)**: **The Voice: "Live Finale" – Oscar Dominguez, Samuel Barker, Ronald K. Wirsgalla, Daniel K. Boland, Erin Anderson, and Andrew Munie (NBC)**‡; America's Got Talent: "Finale Results" – Noah Mitz, Michael Berger, William Gossett, Ryan Tanker, Matt Benson, Patrick Brazil, and Scott Chmielewski (NBC); American Song Contest: "Semi-Final #1" – Noah Mitz, William Gossett, Patrick Brazil, Rob Koenig, Matt Benson, Darien Koop, and Matthew Cotter (NBC); Dancing with the Stars: "Finale" – Tom Sutherland, Joe Holdman, Nate Files, and Matt McAdam (ABC); The Masked Singer: "Group A Semi-Final" – Simon Miles and Cory Fournier (Fox)	**Outstanding Lighting Design / Lighting Direction for a Variety Special (Area)**: **Adele One Night Only – Noah Mitz, Bryan Klunder, Patrick Boozer, Patrick Brazil, Matthew Cotter, and Christopher Landy (CBS)**‡; Annie Live! – Robert Barnhart, Pete Radice, Ben Green, Madigan Stehly, and Robert Styles (NBC); The 64th Annual Grammy Awards – Noah Mitz, Madigan Stehly, Bryan Klunder, Andy O'Reilly, Patrick Boozer, Ryan Tanker, Erin Anderson, and Matthew Cotter (CBS); One Last Time: An Evening with Tony Bennett and Lady Gaga – Leroy Bennett and Jason Baeri (CBS); The Tony Awards Present: Broadway's Back! – Noah Mitz, Ed McCarthy, Harry Sangmeister, Richard Beck, and Jason Rudolph (CBS)

=== Main Title and Motion Design ===
Main Title and Motion Design
**Outstanding Main Title Design**: **Severance – Oliver Latta and Teddy Blanks (Apple TV+)**‡; Candy – Ronnie Koff, Peter Frankfurt, Lexi Gunvaldson, Rob Slychuk, Nader Husseini, and Elizabeth Steinberg (Hulu); Cowboy Bebop – Karin Fong, Kiyoon Nam, James Gardner, Merrill Hall, Kathy Liang, and Lexi Gunvaldson (Netflix); Foundation – Ronnie Koff, Zach Kilroy, Danil Krivoruchko, James Gardner, Brandon Savoy, and Nicole DiLeo (Apple TV+); Lisey's Story – Karin Fong, Osbert Parker, Henry Chang, Merrill Hall, Russ Gautier, and Lexi Gunvaldson (Apple TV+); Only Murders in the Building – Lisa Bolan, Tnaya Witmer, Laura Perez, James Hurlburt, Evan Larimore, and Jahmad Rollins (Hulu); Pachinko – Angus Wall, Nadia Tzuo, Florian Hoffmeister, Ante Cheng, Nathaniel Park, and Lucy Kim (Apple TV+)	**Outstanding Motion Design (Juried)**: **Home Before Dark – Jon Berkowitz, Brad Colwell, Kimberly Tang, and Nolan Borkenhagen (Apple TV+)**‡

=== Makeup ===
Makeup
**Outstanding Contemporary Makeup (Non-Prosthetic)**: **Euphoria: "The Theater and Its Double" – Doniella Davy, Tara Lang Shah, and Alexandra French (HBO)**‡; American Horror Stories: "Rubber(wo)Man: Part One" / "Rubber(wo)Man: Part Two" – Tyson Fountaine, Elizabeth Mendoza Kellogg, Elizabeth Briseno, Ron Pipes, Gage Munster, Heather Cummings, Michael Johnston, and Lufeng Qu (FX on Hulu); American Horror Story: Double Feature: "Gaslight" – Eryn Krueger Mekash, Kim Ayers, Mike Mekash, and Ana Gabriela Quinonez (FX); Angelyne: "The Tease" – David Williams, Ron Pipes, Erin LeBre, Ann Pala Williams, and Mara Rouse (Peacock); Impeachment: American Crime Story: "The Assassination of Monica Lewinsky" – Robin Beauchesne, KarriAnn Sillay, Angela Moos, Erin LeBre, and Kerrin Jackson (FX); Ozark: "A Hard Way to Go" – Tracy Ewell, Kimberly Amacker, and Susan Reilly Lehane (Netflix)	**Outstanding Period and/or Character Makeup (Non-Prosthetic) (Area)**: **Pam & Tommy: "Jane Fonda" – David Williams, Jennifer Aspinall, Jason Collins, Abby Lyle Clawson, Mo Meinhart, Dave Snyder, Bill Myer, and Victor Del Castillo (Hulu)**‡; The First Lady: "Cracked Pot" – Carol Rasheed, Sergio López-Rivera, Valli O'Reilly, Chauntelle Langston, and Milene Melendez (Showtime); The Marvelous Mrs. Maisel: "How Do You Get to Carnegie Hall?" – Patricia Regan, Claus Lulla, Margot Boccia, Tomasina Smith, Michael Laudati, Roberto Baez, and Alberto Machuca (Prime Video); Star Trek: Picard: "Hide and Seek" – Silvina Knight, Tanya Cookingham, Peter De Oliveira, Allyson Carey, and Hanny Eisen (Paramount+); Stranger Things: "Chapter Two: Vecna's Curse" – Amy L. Forsythe, Devin Morales, Leo Satkovich, Nataleigh Verrengia, Rocco Gaglioti Jr., Lisa Poe, Benji Dove, and Jan Rooney (Netflix)
**Outstanding Makeup for a Variety, Nonfiction or Reality Program (Juried)**: **Legendary: "Whorror House" – Tonia Green, Tyson Fountaine, Sean Conklin, Marcel Banks, Jennifer Fregozo, Silvia Leczel, and Glen Alen (HBO Max)**‡; **We're Here: "Kona, Hawaii" – Jeremy "6" Austin, Martin de Luna Jr. "Lushious Massacr", and Laila McQueen (HBO)**‡	**Outstanding Prosthetic Makeup (Area)**: **Stranger Things: "Chapter Four: Dear Billy" – Barrie Gower, Duncan Jarman, Mike Mekash, Eric Garcia, Nix Herrera, Patt Foad, and Paula Eden (Netflix)**‡; Angelyne: "Glow in the Dark Queen of the Universe" – Vincent Van Dyke, Kate Biscoe, Mike Mekash, Abby Lyle Clawson, and Chris Burgoyne (Peacock); Gaslit: "Final Days" – Kazu Hiro, Vincent Van Dyke, Richard Redlefsen, Christopher Nelson, Michael Ornelaz, and Kelly Golden (Starz); Impeachment: American Crime Story: "The Wilderness" – Justin Raleigh, Greg Cannom, Thom Floutz, Chris Hampton, and Kelly Golden (FX); Star Trek: Picard: "Hide and Seek" – James Mackinnon, Vincent Van Dyke, Kevin Kirkpatrick, Hugo Villasenor, Bianca Appice, Neville Page, Toryn Reed, and Ralis Kahn (Paramount+)

=== Music ===
Music
**Outstanding Music Composition for a Series (Original Dramatic Score)**: **Severance: "The We We Are" – Theodore Shapiro (Apple TV+)**‡; The Flight Attendant: "The Reykjavík Ice Sculpture Festival Is Lovely This Time of Year" – Blake Neely (HBO Max); Loki: "Glorious Purpose" – Natalie Holt (Disney+); Only Murders in the Building: "The Boy from 6B" – Siddhartha Khosla (Hulu); Schmigadoon!: "Schmigadoon!" – Christopher Willis (Apple TV+); Succession: "Chiantishire" – Nicholas Britell (HBO)	**Outstanding Music Composition for a Limited or Anthology Series, Movie or Special (Original Dramatic Score)**: **The White Lotus: "Mysterious Monkeys" – Cristobal Tapia de Veer (HBO)**‡; 1883: "1883" – Brian Tyler and Breton Vivian (Paramount+); Moon Knight: "Asylum" – Hesham Nazih (Disney+); Station Eleven: "Unbroken Circle" – Dan Romer (HBO Max); A Very British Scandal: "Episode 1" – Nathan Barr (Prime Video)
**Outstanding Music Composition for a Documentary Series or Special (Original Dramatic Score)**: **Lucy and Desi – David Schwartz (Prime Video)**‡; 14 Peaks: Nothing Is Impossible – Nainita Desai (Netflix); Return to Space – Mychael Danna and Harry Gregson-Williams (Netflix); They Call Me Magic: "Earvin" – Terence Blanchard (Apple TV+); The Tinder Swindler – Jessica Jones (Netflix)	**Outstanding Music Direction**: **The Pepsi Super Bowl LVI Halftime Show Starring Dr. Dre, Snoop Dogg, Mary J. Blige, Eminem, Kendrick Lamar and 50 Cent – Adam Blackstone (NBC)**‡; 43rd Annual Kennedy Center Honors – Rickey Minor (CBS); 44th Annual Kennedy Center Honors – Rickey Minor (CBS); One Last Time: An Evening with Tony Bennett and Lady Gaga – Michael Bearden and Lee Musiker (CBS); Saturday Night Live: "Host: Jake Gyllenhaal" – Lenny Pickett, Leon Pendarvis, and Eli Brueggemann (NBC)
**Outstanding Original Music and Lyrics**: **Schmigadoon!: "Schmigadoon!" – "Corn Puddin'" by Cinco Paul (Apple TV+)**‡; Euphoria: "All My Life, My Heart Has Yearned for a Thing I Cannot Name" – "Elliot's Song" by Labrinth, Muzhda Zemar-McKenzie, and Zendaya (HBO); Euphoria: "You Who Cannot See, Think of Those Who Can" – "I'm Tired" by Labrinth, Zendaya, and Sam Levinson (HBO); The Marvelous Mrs. Maisel: "How to Chew Quietly and Influence People" – "Maybe Monica" by Thomas Mizer and Curtis Moore (Prime Video); This Is Us: "Day of the Wedding" – "The Forever Now" by Siddhartha Khosla and Taylor Goldsmith (NBC)	**Outstanding Original Main Title Theme Music**: **The White Lotus – Cristobal Tapia de Veer (HBO)**‡; Loki – Natalie Holt (Disney+); Only Murders in the Building – Siddhartha Khosla (Hulu); Severance – Theodore Shapiro (Apple TV+); Squid Game – Jung Jae-il (Netflix)
**Outstanding Music Supervision**: **Stranger Things: "Chapter Four: Dear Billy" – Nora Felder (Netflix)**‡; Better Call Saul: "Black and Blue" – Thomas Golubić (AMC); Euphoria: "Trying to Get to Heaven Before They Close the Door" – Jen Malone and Adam Leber (HBO); The Marvelous Mrs. Maisel: "How Do You Get to Carnegie Hall?" – Robin Urdang (Prime Video); Ozark: "The Cousin of Death" – Gabe Hilfer (Netflix); The White Lotus: "Departures" – Janet Lopez (HBO)

=== Picture Editing ===
Picture Editing
**Outstanding Single-Camera Picture Editing for a Drama Series**: **Euphoria: "The Theater and Its Double" – Laura Zempel, Julio C. Perez IV, Nikola Boyanov, and Aaron I. Butler (HBO)**‡; Severance: "In Perpetuity" – Erica Freed Marker and Geoffrey Richman (Apple TV+); Severance: "The We We Are" – Geoffrey Richman (Apple TV+); Squid Game: "Gganbu" – Nam Na-yeong (Netflix); Stranger Things: "Chapter Four: Dear Billy" – Dean Zimmerman and Casey Cichocki (Netflix); Succession: "All the Bells Say" – Ken Eluto and Ellen Tam (HBO); Succession: "Chiantishire" – Jane Rizzo (HBO)	**Outstanding Single-Camera Picture Editing for a Comedy Series**: **Barry: "starting now" – Ali Greer (HBO)**‡; Hacks: "There Will Be Blood" – Jessica Brunetto (HBO Max); Insecure: "Choices, Okay?!" – Nena Erb (HBO); Only Murders in the Building: "Fan Fiction" – JoAnne Marie Yarrow (Hulu); Only Murders in the Building: "Open and Shut" – Julie Monroe (Hulu); Ted Lasso: "No Weddings and a Funeral" – A.J. Catoline and Alex Szabo (Apple TV+); Ted Lasso: "Rainbow" – Melissa McCoy (Apple TV+)
**Outstanding Multi-Camera Picture Editing for a Comedy Series**: **How I Met Your Father: "Timing Is Everything" – Sue Federman (Hulu)**‡; Call Me Kat: "Call Me by My Middle Name" – Pam Marshall (Fox)	**Outstanding Single-Camera Picture Editing for a Limited or Anthology Series or Movie**: **The White Lotus: "Departures" – John M. Valerio (HBO)**‡; Dopesick: "Black Box Warning" – C. Chi-yoon Chung (Hulu); Dopesick: "First Bottle" – Douglas Crise (Hulu); Pam & Tommy: "I Love You, Tommy" – Tatiana S. Riegel (Hulu); Station Eleven: "Unbroken Circle" – David Eisenberg, Anna Hauger, Anthony McAfee, and Yoni Reiss (HBO Max); The White Lotus: "Mysterious Monkeys" – Heather Persons (HBO)
**Outstanding Picture Editing for Variety Programming (Area)**: **A Black Lady Sketch Show: "Save My Edges, I'm a Donor!" – Stephanie Filo, Bradinn French, Taylor Joy Mason, and S. Robyn Wilson (HBO)**‡; Conan: "Series Finale" – Robert James Ashe, Mike Api, Christopher P. Heller, and Matthew Shaw (TBS); The Daily Show with Trevor Noah: "Jordan Klepper Takes on 'Wellness' Anti-Vaxxers + Fringewatching Rep. Lauren Boebert" – Storm Choi, Eric Davies, Tom Favilla, Lauren Beckett Jackson, Nikolai Johnson, Ryan Middleton, Mark Paone, Erin Shannon, Catherine Trasborg, and Einar Westerlund (Comedy Central); Harry Potter 20th Anniversary: Return to Hogwarts – Simon Bryant, Jim Clark, James Collett, Bill DeRonde, Asaf Eisenberg, Will Gilbey, Lior Linevitz–Matthews, Pablo Noe, Tim Perniciaro, and Jacob Proctor (HBO Max); Last Week Tonight with John Oliver: "The Confesstigators" – Anthony Miale (HBO)	**Outstanding Picture Editing for a Nonfiction Program**: **The Beatles: Get Back: "Part 3: Days 17–22" – Jabez Olssen (Disney+)**‡; George Carlin's American Dream – Joseph Beshenkovsky (HBO); Lucy and Desi – Robert A. Martinez, Dan Reed, and Inaya Graciana Yusuf (Prime Video); Stanley Tucci: Searching for Italy: "Venice" – Hamit Shonpal (CNN); The Tinder Swindler – Julian Hart (Netflix); We Need to Talk About Cosby: "Part 1" – Meg Ramsay, Jennifer Brooks, F. Michael Young, and Jeremy Lusk (Showtime)
**Outstanding Picture Editing for a Structured Reality or Competition Program**: **Lizzo's Watch Out for the Big Grrrls: "Naked" – Deidre Panziera, Hannah Carpenter, Brian Murphy, and Jeanie Phillips (Prime Video)**‡; Queer Eye: "Angel Gets Her Wings" – Nova Taylor and Sean Gill (Netflix); RuPaul's Drag Race: "Big Opening #1" – Jamie Martin, Paul Cross, Ryan Mallick, and Michael Roha (VH1); RuPaul's Drag Race All Stars: "Halftime Headliners" – Michael Lynn Deis, Mary DeChambres, Katherine Griffin, Laurel Mick Ostrander, and Michael Roha (Paramount+); Top Chef: "Restaurant Wars" – Steve Lichtenstein, Ericka Concha, Tim Daniel, George Dybas, Eric Lambert, Anthony Rivard, Jay Rogers, Sarah Goff, Matt Reynolds, and Clark Vogeler (Bravo)	**Outstanding Picture Editing for an Unstructured Reality Program**: **Love on the Spectrum U.S.: "Episode 1" – Rachel Grierson-Johns, Simon Callow-Wright, and John Rosser (Netflix)**‡; Below Deck Mediterranean: "A Yacht in Kneed" – Cameron Teisher, Garrett Hohendorf, Bil Yoelin, and Jonathan Anderson (Bravo); Cheer: "Daytona Pt. 2: If the Judges Disagree" – Daniel George McDonald, Daniel J. Clark, Zachary Fuhrer, Stefanie Maridueña, Dana Martell, Jody McVeigh-Schultz, Sharon Weaver, and David Zucker (Netflix); Deadliest Catch: "Five Souls on Board" – Rob Butler, Isaiah Camp, Alexandra Moore, Adrian Orozco, Alexander Rubinow, Hugh Elliott, and Chris Courtner (Discovery Channel); Life Below Zero: "Fire in the Sky" – Michael Swingler, Tony Diaz, Matt Edwards, and Jennifer Nelson (National Geographic)

=== Sound Editing ===
Sound Editing
**Outstanding Sound Editing for a Comedy or Drama Series (One Hour)**: **Stranger Things: "Chapter Seven: The Massacre at Hawkins Lab" – Craig Henighan, Will Files, Ryan Cole, Korey Pereira, Angelo Palazzo, Katie Halliday, Ken McGill, Steven Baine, David Klotz, and Lena Glikson-Nezhelskaya (Netflix)**‡; Better Call Saul: "Carrot and Stick" – Nick Forshager, Kathryn Madsen, Jane Boegel, Matt Temple, Marc Glassman, Jeff Cranford, Jason Tregoe Newman, Gregg Barbanell, and Alex Ullrich (AMC); The Book of Boba Fett: "Chapter 6: From the Desert Comes a Stranger" – Matthew Wood, Bonnie Wild, David Acord, Angela Ang, Ryan Cota, Benjamin A. Burtt, David Collins, Alyssa Nevarez, Stephanie McNally, Margie O'Malley, Andrea Gard, and Sean England (Disney+); Loki: "Journey into Mystery" – Matthew Wood, David Acord, David Farmer, Brad Semenoff, Steve Slanec, Kyrsten Mate, Adam Kopald, Joel Raabe, Anele Onyekwere, Ed Hamilton, Nashia Wachsman, Shelley Roden, and John Roesch (Disney+); Star Trek: Picard: "Penance" – Matthew E. Taylor, Michael Schapiro, Sean Heissinger, Alex Pugh, Clay Weber, John Sanacore, Ben Schor, Katherine Harper, and Ginger Geary (Paramount+); Star Trek: Strange New Worlds: "Memento Mori" – Matthew E. Taylor, Michael Schapiro, Sean Heissinger, Kip Smedley, Clay Weber, John Sanacore, David Barbee, Matt Decker, Alyson Dee Moore, Rick Owens, and Chris Moriana (Paramount+)	**Outstanding Sound Editing for a Comedy or Drama Series (Half-Hour) and Animation**: **Barry: "starting now" – Sean Heissinger, Matthew E. Taylor, John Creed, Rickley W. Dumm, Clay Weber, Darrin Mann, Michael Brake, Alyson Dee Moore, and Chris Moriana (HBO)**‡; Arcane: "When These Walls Come Tumbling Down" – Brad Beaumont, Eliot Connors, Shannon Beaumont, Alex Ephraim, Alexander Temple, Alex Seaver, Dan O'Connell, and John Cucci (Netflix); Cobra Kai: "The Rise" – Patrick Hogan, Daniel Salas, Jesse Pomeroy, Gary DeLeone, Nick Papalia, Andres Locsey, and Mitchell Kohen (Netflix); Love, Death & Robots: "In Vaulted Halls Entombed" – Brad North, Craig Henighan, Antony Zeller, Jeff Charbonneau, Zane Bruce, and Lindsay Pepper (Netflix); Ted Lasso: "Beard After Hours" – Brent Findley, Bernard Weiser, Ashley Harvey, Kip Smedley, Mark Cleary, Jordan McClain, Sharyn Gersh, Richard David Brown, Sanaa Kelley, and Matt Salib (Apple TV+); What We Do in the Shadows: "The Escape" – Steffan Falesitch, Chris Kahwaty, David Barbee, John Guentner, Sam Lewis, Steve Griffen, and Ellen Heuer (FX)
**Outstanding Sound Editing for a Limited or Anthology Series, Movie or Special**: **Moon Knight: "Gods and Monsters" – Bonnie Wild, Mac Smith, Kimberly Patrick, Vanessa Lapato, Matt Hartman, Teresa Eckton, Tim Farrell, Leo Marcil, Joel Raabe, Ian Chase, Anele Onyekwere, Stephanie Lowry, Carl Sealove, Dan O'Connell, and John Cucci (Disney+)**‡; American Horror Story: Double Feature: "Gaslight" – Christian Buenaventura, Steve M. Stuhr, David Beadle, Tim Cleveland, Zheng Jia, Samuel Muñoz, Sean McGuire, and Noel Vought (FX); Gaslit: "Year of the Rat" – Kevin Buchholz, Stefani Feldman, Sang Kim, Dan Kremer, Adam Parrish King, Sam Munoz, Jordan Aldinger, Ben Zales, Chris Rummel, Jacob McNaughton, and Noel Vought (Starz); Midnight Mass: "Book VII: Revelation" – Trevor Gates, Jonathan Wales, Kristen Hirlinger, Jason Dotts, Michael Baird, Paul Knox, Russell Topal, James Miller, Matthew Thomas Hall, Mark Coffey, Amy Barber, Julia Huberman, Brett "Snacky" Pierce, Ben Parker, and Jonathan Bruce (Netflix); Station Eleven: "Wheel of Fire" – Bradley North, Tiffany S. Griffith, Chuck Michael, Matt Manselle, Matt Telsey, Lodge Worster, and Brian Straub (HBO Max)	**Outstanding Sound Editing for a Nonfiction or Reality Program (Single or Multi-Camera)**: **The Beatles: Get Back: "Part 3: Days 17–22" – Martin Kwok, Emile De La Rey, Matt Stutter, Michael Donaldson, Stephen Gallagher, Tane Upjohn-Beatson, and Simon Riley (Disney+)**‡; George Carlin's American Dream – Bobby Mackston, Miriam Cole, Matt Temple, and Joseph Beshenkovsky (HBO); Lucy and Desi – Anthony Vanchure, Daniel Pagan, Mike James Gallagher, Jason Tregoe Newman, and Bryant J. Fuhrmann (Prime Video); McCartney 3,2,1: "The People We Loved Were Loving Us!" – Jonathan Greber, Leff Lefferts, Bjorn Ole Schroeder, E. Larry Oatfield, and Kim Foscato (Hulu); The Tinder Swindler – Maria Kelly, Chad Orororo, and Nirupama Rajendran (Netflix)

=== Sound Mixing ===
Sound Mixing
**Outstanding Sound Mixing for a Comedy or Drama Series (One Hour)**: **Stranger Things: "Chapter Seven: The Massacre at Hawkins Lab" – Will Files, Mark Paterson, Craig Henighan, and Michael P. Clark (Netflix)**‡; Better Call Saul: "Carrot and Stick" – Larry Benjamin, Kevin Valentine, and Phillip W. Palmer (AMC); Euphoria: "Stand Still Like the Hummingbird" – Anne Jimkes-Root, Chris David, Austin Roth, and Sean O'Malley (HBO); The Marvelous Mrs. Maisel: "How Do You Get to Carnegie Hall?" – Ron Bochar, Mathew Price, George A. Lara, and Stewart Lerman (Prime Video); Ozark: "Sanctified" – Larry Benjamin, Kevin Valentine, Akira Fukasawa, and Amy Barber (Netflix); Succession: "Too Much Birthday" – Nicholas Renbeck, Andy Kris, and Ken Ishii (HBO)	**Outstanding Sound Mixing for a Limited or Anthology Series or Movie**: **The White Lotus: "Departures" – Christian Minkler, Ryan Collins, Walter Anderson, and Jeffrey Roy (HBO)**‡; Dopesick: "Pseudo-Addiction" – Nick Offord, Ryan Collins, and Jay Meagher (Hulu); Gaslit: "Final Days" – John W. Cook II, Ben Wilkins, and Devendra Cleary (Starz); Moon Knight: "Gods and Monsters" – Bonnie Wild, Scott R. Lewis, Tamás Csaba, and Scott Michael Smith (Disney+); Pam & Tommy: "The Master Beta" – Nick Offord, Ryan Collins, and Juan Cisneros (Hulu)
**Outstanding Sound Mixing for a Comedy or Drama Series (Half-Hour) and Animation (Area)**: **Only Murders in the Building: "The Boy from 6B" – Lindsey Alvarez, Mathew Waters, Joseph White Jr., and Alan DeMoss (Hulu)**‡; Barry: "all the sauces" – Elmo Ponsdomenech, Teddy Salas, and Scott Harber (HBO); Curb Your Enthusiasm: "IRASSHAIMASE!" – Earl Martin, Chuck Buch, and Michael Miller (HBO); Hacks: "The Captain's Wife" – John W. Cook II, Ben Wilkins, and Jim Lakin (HBO Max); Ted Lasso: "Rainbow" – Ryan Kennedy, Sean Byrne, David Lascelles, and Arno Stephanian (Apple TV+); What We Do in the Shadows: "The Casino" – Diego Gat, Sam Ejnes, and Rob Beal (FX)	**Outstanding Sound Mixing for a Variety Series or Special (Area)**: **Adele One Night Only – Paul Wittman, Tom Elmhirst, Eric Schilling, Josh Morton, Kristian Pedregon, Shane O'Connor, and Christian Schrader (CBS)**‡; The 64th Annual Grammy Awards – Thomas Holmes, John Harris, Eric Schilling, Christian Schrader, Eric Johnston, Josh Morton, Ron Reaves, Jeffrey Michael Peterson, Mike Parker, Tom Pesa, Juan Pablo Velasco, and Aaron Walk (CBS); The Late Show with Stephen Colbert: "First Show Back with an Audience, Dana Carvey as Joe Biden, Interview with Jon Stewart, and Jon Batiste Performs 'Freedom'" – Pierre de Laforcade, Harvey Goldberg, Alan Bonomo, and Tom Herrmann (CBS); The Pepsi Super Bowl LVI Halftime Show Starring Dr. Dre, Snoop Dogg, Mary J. Blige, Eminem, Kendrick Lamar and 50 Cent – Thomas Holmes, Alex Guessard, Dave Natale, Tom Pesa, Christian Schrader, and Pablo Munguia (NBC); Saturday Night Live: "Host: John Mulaney" – Robert Palladino, Ezra Matychak, Bob Selitto, Frank J. Duca Jr., Caroline Sanchez, Josiah Gluck, Tyler McDiarmid, Douglas Nightwine, William Taylor, Devin Emke, Eric Pfeifer, and Andrew Guastella (NBC)
**Outstanding Sound Mixing for a Nonfiction or Reality Program (Single or Multi-Camera) (Area)**: **The Beatles: Get Back: "Part 3: Days 17–22" – Michael Hedges, Brent Burge, Alexis Feodoroff, and Giles Martin (Disney+)**‡; George Carlin's American Dream – Earl Martin, Jason Gaya, Brad Bergbom, and Kevin Rosen Quan (HBO); Lizzo's Watch Out for the Big Grrrls: "Becoming 100% That Bitch" – Erik Brena, Ross D'Alessandro, Julianne Kane, and Deanna Decenario (Prime Video); McCartney 3,2,1: "These Things Bring You Together" – Gary A. Rizzo and Laura Cunningham (Hulu); RuPaul's Drag Race: "Big Opening #1" – Erik Valenzuela, David Nolte, and Glenn Gaines (VH1); Stanley Tucci: Searching for Italy: "Venice" – Tom O'Pray and Renato Ferrari (CNN)

=== Special Visual Effects ===
Special Visual Effects
**Outstanding Special Visual Effects in a Season or a Movie**: **The Book of Boba Fett – Richard Bluff, Abbigail Keller, Paul Kavanagh, Cameron Neilson, Scott Fisher, John Rosengrant, Enrico Damm, Robin Hackl, and Landis Fields (Disney+)**‡; Foundation – Chris MacLean, Addie Manis, Mike Enriquez, Victoria Keeling, Chris Keller, Jess Brown, Nicolas Hernandez, Richard Clegg, and Arnaud Brisebois (Apple TV+); Lost in Space – Jabbar Raisani, Terron Pratt, Troy Davis, Dirk Valk, Jed Glassford, Niklas Jacobson, Juri Stanossek, Jared Higgins, and Paul Benjamin (Netflix); Stranger Things – Michael Maher Jr., Marion Spates, Jabbar Raisani, Terron Pratt, Ashley J. Ward, Julien Hery, Niklas Jacobson, Manolo Mantero, and Neil Eskuri (Netflix); The Witcher – Dadi Einarsson, Gavin Round, Bruno Baron, Matthias Bjarnason, Sebastien Francoeur, Aleksandar Pejic, Oliver Cubbage, Mateusz Tokarz, and Stefano Pepin (Netflix)	**Outstanding Special Visual Effects in a Single Episode (Area)**: **Squid Game: "VIPS" – Cheong Jai-hoon, Kang Moon-jung, Kim Hye-jin, Jo Hyun-jin, Kim Seong-cheol, Lee Jae-bum, Shin Min-soo, Seok Jong-yeon, and Jun Sung-man (Netflix)**‡; The Man Who Fell to Earth: "Hallo, Spaceboy" – Jason Michael Zimmerman, Aleksandra Kochoska, Shawn Ewashko, Simon Carr, Elizabeth Alvarez, Richard R Reed, Jesper Kjolsrud, Anna James, and Neal Champion (Showtime); See: "Rock-a-Bye" – Chris Wright, Parker Chehak, Scott Riopelle, Javier Roca, Tristan Zerafa, Nathan Overstrom, Sam O'Hare, Tony Kenny, and Tamriko Barda (Apple TV+); Snowpiercer: "A Beacon for Us All" – Geoff Scott, Darren Bell, Chris Ryan, Christine Galvan, Anita Milias, Jordan Acomba, Jason Snea, Hannes Poser, and Jamie Barty (TNT); Vikings: Valhalla: "The Bridge" – Ben Mossman, Melanie Callaghan, Vishal Rustgi, Troy Tylka, Mina Gaued, Jorge Perez, Liz Sui, Blayke Nadeau, and Summer Zong (Netflix)

=== Stunts ===
Stunt Coordination
**Outstanding Stunt Coordination for a Comedy Series or Variety Program**: **Barry – Wade Allen (HBO)**‡; Cobra Kai – Ken Barefield (Netflix); Hawkeye – Heidi Moneymaker and Noon Orsatti (Disney+); Peacemaker – Wayne Dalglish and Gaston Morrison (HBO Max); The Righteous Gemstones – John Copeman (HBO); What We Do in the Shadows – Tig Fong and JF Lachapelle (FX)	**Outstanding Stunt Coordination for a Drama Series, Limited or Anthology Series or Movie**: **Stranger Things – Hiro Koda (Netflix)**‡; The Blacklist – Cort L. Hessler III (NBC); The Book of Boba Fett – JJ Dashnaw (Disney+); Moon Knight – Olivier Schneider and Yves Girard (Disney+); 9-1-1: Lone Star – Buddy Sosthand (Fox); The Witcher – Adam Horton (Netflix)
**Outstanding Stunt Performance**: **Squid Game: "Stick to the Team" – Lim Tae-hoon, Shim Sang-min, Kim Cha-i, and Lee Tae-young (Netflix)**‡; Barry: "710N" – Clay Cullen, David Castillo, Jolene Van Vugt, and Chris Morrison (HBO); The Blacklist: "Between Sleep and Awake" – Chad Michael Hessler (NBC); Hawkeye: "Echoes" – Carl Richard Burden, Noon Orsatti, Renae Moneymaker, and Crystal Hooks (Disney+); Moon Knight: "Gods and Monsters" – Daren Nop, Jamel Blissat, Estelle Darnault, and Sara Leal (Disney+); Stranger Things: "Chapter Four: Dear Billy" – Matthew Scheib and Jurijs Kruze (Netflix)

=== Technical Direction ===
Technical Direction
**Outstanding Technical Direction, Camerawork, Video Control for a Series (Area)**: **Last Week Tonight with John Oliver: "Union Busting" – Dave Saretsky, Dante Pagano, John Harrison, Rich Freedman, John Schwartz, and Augie Yuson (HBO)**‡; American Idol: "Disney Night" – Charles Ciup, David Bernstein, Bettina Levesque, Bert Atkinson, Damien Tuffereau, Rob Palmer, Bruce Green, Daryl Studebaker, Mike Carr, Jofre Rosero, Nat Havholm, Easter Xua, Andrew Georgopoulos, Ed Horton, Brian Reason, Keith Dicker, Adam Margolis, Ron Lehman, Christopher Gray, and Luke Chantrell (ABC); The Daily Show with Trevor Noah: "Robert Glasper Performs 'Heaven's Here'" – Michael Williams, Matt Muro, Rich York, Tim Quigley, Phil Salanto, Ricardo Sarmiento, and Joel Sadler (Comedy Central); Dancing with the Stars: "Horror Night" – Charles Ciup, Christine Salomon, Brian Reason, Bettina Levesque, Daryl Studebaker, Cary Symmons, Bert Atkinson, Nat Havholm, Ron Lehman, Mike Carr, Adam Margolis, Damien Tuffereau, Easter Xua, Derek Pratt, Mark Koonce, John Gardner, Andrew Georgopoulos, Dylan Sanford, Luke Chantrell, and Ed Moore (ABC); The Masked Singer: "Masks Back – The Good, the Bad & the Cuddly – Round 1" – Christine Salomon, Nat Havholm, Mark Koonce, Brett Crutcher, Adam Margolis, Rob Palmer, Ron Lehman, Bert Atkinson, Bettina Levesque, Jeff Wheat, Kary D'Alessandro, Daryl Studebaker, John Goforth, Cary Symmons, Sean Flannery, Darin Gallacher, and Chris Hill (Fox); The Voice: "Live Top 10 Performances" – Allan Wells, Danny Bonilla, Mano Bonilla, Martin J. Brown Jr., Robert Burnette, Suzanne Ebner, Guido Frenzel, Alex Hernandez, Marc Hunter, Scott Hylton, Kathrine Iacofano, Scott Kaye, Steve Martynuk, Jofre Rosero, Steve Simmons, and Terrance Ho (NBC)	**Outstanding Technical Direction, Camerawork, Video Control for a Special (Area)**: **Adele One Night Only – Michael Anderson, Dan Winterburn, Danny Webb, Rob Palmer, David Eastwood, Vincent Foilett, Allen Merriweather, Bruce Green, Robert Del Russo, Brian Lataille, Keith Dicker, Patrick Gleason, Danny Bonilla, Rob Vuona, David Rudd, Keyan Safyari, Freddy Frederick, Gabriel De La Parra, Jofre Rosero, David Carline, Kosta Krstic, Terrance Ho, and Joey Lopez (CBS)**‡; 57th Academy of Country Music Awards – Eric Becker, Iqbal Hans, Danny Bonilla, Mano Bonilla, Davide Carline, Robert Del Russo, Suzanne Ebner, Darla Elledge, Freddy Frederick Jr., Pat Gleason, Ed Horton, Garrett Hurt, Kat Kallergis, Jay Kulick, Steve Martyniuk, Allen Merriweather, Lyn Noland, Rob Palmer, John Perry, David Plakos, Easter Xua, Danny Webb, Matt Greene, Cody Alderman, Daniel Schade, Jeff Lee, Terrance Ho, Guy Jones, and Kevin Faust (Prime Video); The 64th Annual Grammy Awards – Eric Becker, Ken Shapiro, Danny Bonilla, Michael Carr, Suzanne Ebner, Sean Flannery, Jeremy Freeman, Helena Jackson, Tore Livia, Steve Martyniuk, Allen Merriweather, Rob Palmer, John Perry, David Plakos, Jofre Rosero, Keyan Safyari, Chad Smith, Easter Xua, Guy Jones, and Kevin Faust (CBS); 2021 MTV Video Music Awards – Eric Becker, Mike Williams, Shaun Harkins, John Lee, Rich York, David Trenkle, Nat Havholm, Robert Del Russo, Mark Renaudin, Tore Livia, Rob Balton, Jimmy O'Donnell, Marc Bloomgarden, Ray Hoover, Daniel Paulet, Kurt Decker, Jay Kulick, Jeff Latonero, Jofre Rosaro, J.M. Hurley, and Bob Benedetti (MTV); One Last Time: An Evening with Tony Bennett and Lady Gaga – Lori Gallati, Rob Balton, Jerry Cancel, Eli Clarke, Robert Del Russo, Dave Driscoll, Jay Kulick, Jeff Latonero, Lyn Noland, Mark Renaudin, Carlos Rios, Jim Scurti, Tim Quigley, Dan Zadwarny, and J.M. Hurley (CBS)

=== Writing ===
Writing
**Outstanding Writing for a Variety Series**: **Last Week Tonight with John Oliver – Daniel O'Brien, Owen Parsons, Charlie Redd, Joanna Rothkopf, Seena Vali, Johnathan Appel, Ali Barthwell, Tim Carvell, Liz Hynes, Greg Iwinski, Ryan Ken, Mark Kramer, Sofía Manfredi, John Oliver, Taylor Kay Phillips, and Chrissy Shackelford (HBO)**‡; A Black Lady Sketch Show – Tracey Ashley, Robin Thede, Alrinthea Carter, Michelle Davis, Sonia Denis, Jonterri Gadson, Chloé Hilliard, Shenovia Large, and Natalie McGill (HBO); The Daily Show with Trevor Noah – Dan Amira, Lauren Sarver Means, Daniel Radosh, David Angelo, Devin Delliquanti, Zach DiLanzo, Jen Flanz, Jason Gilbert, Josh Johnson, David Kibuuka, Matt Koff, Christiana Mbakwe, Trevor Noah, Joseph Opio, Randall Otis, Zhubin Parang, Kat Radley, Scott Sherman, and Ashton Womack (Comedy Central); The Late Show with Stephen Colbert – Ariel Dumas, Jay Katsir, Delmonte Bent, Michael Brumm, Aaron Cohen, Stephen T. Colbert, Paul Dinello, Glenn Eichler, Gabe Gronli, Barry Julien, Michael Cruz Kayne, Eliana Kwartler, Matt Lappin, Caroline Lazar, Pratima Mani, Felipe Torres Medina, Opus Moreschi, Carley Moseley, Asher Perlman, Tom Purcell, Kate Sidley, Brian Stack, John Thibodeaux, and Steve Waltien (CBS); Saturday Night Live – Michael Che, Alison Gates, Streeter Seidell, Colin Jost, Kent Sublette, Bryan Tucker, Dan Bulla, Mike DiCenzo, Billy Domineau, Alex English, Martin Herlihy, Steve Higgins, John Higgins, Vanessa Jackson, Erik Kenward, Tesha Kondrat, Ben Marshall, Lorne Michaels, Jake Nordwind, Ben Silva, Will Stephen, Celeste Yim, Anna Drezen, Steven Castillo, Rob Klein, Jasmine Pierce, Rosebud Baker, Clare O'Kane, Pete Schultz, Megan Callahan-Shah, Dennis McNicholas, Josh Patten, and Mark Steinbach (NBC)	**Outstanding Writing for a Nonfiction Program**: **Lucy and Desi – Mark Monroe (Prime Video)**‡; The Andy Warhol Diaries: "Shadows: Andy & Jed" – Andrew Rossi (Netflix); How To with John Wilson: "How to Appreciate Wine" – John Wilson, Michael Koman, Susan Orlean, and Conner O'Malley (HBO); The Problem with Jon Stewart: "The Economy" – Chelsea Devantez, Jon Stewart, and Kristen Acimovic (Apple TV+); The Tinder Swindler – Felicity Morris (Netflix)

=== Nominations and wins by program ===
For the purposes of the lists below, any wins in juried categories are assumed to have a prior nomination.

Shows with multiple Creative Arts nominations
Nominations	Show	Network
13	Euphoria	HBO
13	Succession	HBO
12	Hacks	HBO Max
12	Stranger Things	Netflix
11	Only Murders in the Building	Hulu
10	Ted Lasso	Apple TV+
9	The White Lotus	HBO
8	The Marvelous Mrs. Maisel	Prime Video
8	Moon Knight	Disney+
7	Barry	HBO
7	Ozark	Netflix
7	RuPaul's Drag Race	VH1
7	Severance	Apple TV+
7	Squid Game	Netflix
6	Loki	Disney+
6	Lucy and Desi	Prime Video
6	Pam & Tommy	Hulu
6	Saturday Night Live	NBC
6	Queer Eye	Netflix
5	Adele One Night Only	CBS
5	Arcane	Netflix
5	The Beatles: Get Back	Disney+
5	Dopesick	Hulu
5	George Carlin's American Dream	HBO
5	The 64th Annual Grammy Awards	CBS
5	Lizzo's Watch Out for the Big Grrrls	Prime Video
5	The Pepsi Super Bowl LVI Halftime Show Starring Dr. Dre, Snoop Dogg, Mary J. Blige, Eminem, Kendrick Lamar, 50 Cent	NBC
5	Stanley Tucci: Searching for Italy	CNN
5	The Tinder Swindler	Netflix
4	The Andy Warhol Diaries	Netflix
4	A Black Lady Sketch Show	HBO
4	The Book of Boba Fett	Disney+
4	Gaslit	Starz
4	Last Week Tonight with John Oliver	HBO
4	The Late Show with Stephen Colbert	CBS
4	One Last Time: An Evening with Tony Bennett and Lady Gaga	CBS
4	Schmigadoon!	Apple TV+
4	Star Trek: Picard	Paramount+
4	Station Eleven	HBO Max
4	Top Chef	Bravo
4	We Need to Talk About Cosby	Showtime
4	What We Do in the Shadows	FX
3	Angelyne	Peacock
3	Annie Live!	NBC
3	Better Call Saul	AMC
3	Bridgerton	Netflix
3	Cheer	Netflix
3	Curb Your Enthusiasm	HBO
3	The Daily Show with Trevor Noah	Comedy Central
3	Dancing with the Stars	ABC
3	1883	Paramount+
3	The First Lady	Showtime
3	Impeachment: American Crime Story	FX
3	Love, Death & Robots	Netflix
3	Love on the Spectrum U.S.	Netflix
3	McCartney 3,2,1	Hulu
3	The Oscars	ABC
3	What If...?	Disney+
3	The Witcher	Netflix
2	American Horror Stories	FX on Hulu
2	American Horror Story: Double Feature	FX
2	Below Deck Mediterranean	Bravo
2	Black-ish	ABC
2	The Blacklist	NBC
2	The Boys Presents: Diabolical	Prime Video
2	Cobra Kai	Netflix
2	Dave Chappelle: The Closer	Netflix
2	Deadliest Catch	Discovery Channel
2	The Flight Attendant	HBO Max
2	Foundation	Apple TV+
2	The Great	Hulu
2	Harry Potter 20th Anniversary: Return to Hogwarts	HBO Max
2	Hawkeye	Disney+
2	How I Met Your Father	Hulu
2	I Think You Should Leave with Tim Robinson	Netflix
2	Insecure	HBO
2	Life Below Zero	National Geographic
2	Live in Front of a Studio Audience: The Facts of Life and Diff'rent Strokes	ABC
2	The Masked Singer	Fox
2	Norm Macdonald: Nothing Special	Netflix
2	100 Foot Wave	HBO
2	Our Great National Parks	Netflix
2	The Problem with Jon Stewart	Apple TV+
2	Savage X Fenty Show Vol. 3	Prime Video
2	Shark Tank	ABC
2	State of the Union	Sundance TV
2	The Tony Awards Present: Broadway's Back!	CBS
2	The Voice	NBC
2	We Feed People	Disney+
2	We're Here	HBO
2	Zoey's Extraordinary Christmas	The Roku Channel

Shows with multiple Creative Arts wins
Wins	Show	Network
5	Adele One Night Only	CBS
5	The Beatles: Get Back	Disney+
5	Euphoria	HBO
5	Stranger Things	Netflix
5	The White Lotus	HBO
4	Arcane	Netflix
4	Squid Game	Netflix
3	Barry	HBO
3	Love on the Spectrum U.S.	Netflix
3	Only Murders in the Building	Hulu
3	The Pepsi Super Bowl LVI Halftime Show Starring Dr. Dre, Snoop Dogg, Mary J. Blige, Eminem, Kendrick Lamar and 50 Cent	NBC
2	A Black Lady Sketch Show	HBO
2	Hacks	HBO Max
2	How I Met Your Father	Hulu
2	Last Week Tonight with John Oliver	HBO
2	Lizzo's Watch Out for the Big Grrrls	Prime Video
2	Love, Death & Robots	Netflix
2	Lucy and Desi	Prime Video
2	RuPaul's Drag Race	VH1
2	Severance	Apple TV+
2	We're Here	HBO

=== Nominations and wins by network ===
Networks with multiple Creative Arts nominations
Nominations	Network
93	HBO / HBO Max
87	Netflix
34	Apple TV+
34	Disney+
32	Hulu
27	CBS
26	Prime Video
24	NBC
16	ABC
15	FX / FX on Hulu
11	Paramount+
11	Showtime
9	VH1
7	Bravo
7	YouTube
6	Fox
5	CNN
4	Starz
3	AMC
3	Comedy Central
3	Peacock
3	The Roku Channel
2	Adult Swim
2	Discovery Channel
2	Discovery+
2	National Geographic
2	PBS
2	Sundance TV
2	TBS

Networks with multiple Creative Arts wins
Wins	Network
26	HBO / HBO Max
23	Netflix
9	Disney+
8	Hulu
6	Prime Video
5	Apple TV+
5	CBS
5	NBC
3	FX / FX on Hulu
2	VH1

== Ceremony order and presenters ==
The following categories were presented at each ceremony:

Saturday, September 3
Category	Presenter(s)
Outstanding Variety Special (Pre-Recorded)	Judd Apatow
Outstanding Directing for a Variety Series	Judd Apatow
Outstanding Picture Editing for Variety Programming	Judd Apatow
Outstanding Lighting Design / Lighting Direction for a Variety Series	Mary Fitzgerald; Emma Hernan; Chelsea Lazkani; Chrishell Stause
Outstanding Lighting Design / Lighting Direction for a Variety Special	Mary Fitzgerald; Emma Hernan; Chelsea Lazkani; Chrishell Stause
Outstanding Hairstyling for a Variety, Nonfiction or Reality Program	Mary Fitzgerald; Emma Hernan; Chelsea Lazkani; Chrishell Stause
Outstanding Character Voice-Over Performance	RuPaul
Outstanding Narrator	RuPaul
Outstanding Commercial	RuPaul
Outstanding Choreography for Variety or Reality Programming	Monica Aldama; Morgan Simianer
Outstanding Cinematography for a Nonfiction Program	Monica Aldama; Morgan Simianer
Outstanding Cinematography for a Reality Program	Monica Aldama; Morgan Simianer
Outstanding Music Direction	Randy Rainbow
Outstanding Music Composition for a Documentary Series or Special (Original Dramatic Score)	Randy Rainbow
Outstanding Individual Achievement in Animation	Randy Rainbow
Outstanding Unstructured Reality Program	Cat Deeley
Outstanding Picture Editing for a Structured Reality or Competition Program	Cat Deeley
Outstanding Directing for a Reality Program	Cat Deeley
Outstanding Production Design for a Variety, Reality or Competition Series	Nicole Byer
Outstanding Production Design for a Variety Special	Nicole Byer
Outstanding Costumes for Variety, Nonfiction, or Reality Programming	Nicole Byer
Outstanding Documentary or Nonfiction Series	Bobby Berk; Karamo Brown; Tan France; Antoni Porowski; Jonathan Van Ness
Outstanding Writing for a Variety Series	Bobby Berk; Karamo Brown; Tan France; Antoni Porowski; Jonathan Van Ness
Outstanding Makeup for a Variety, Nonfiction or Reality Program	Bobby Berk; Karamo Brown; Tan France; Antoni Porowski; Jonathan Van Ness
Outstanding Short Form Animated Program	Jon Gabrus; Adam Pally
Outstanding Short Form Comedy, Drama or Variety Series	Jon Gabrus; Adam Pally
Outstanding Short Form Nonfiction or Reality Series	Jon Gabrus; Adam Pally
Outstanding Directing for a Documentary/Nonfiction Program	Chris Hardwick
Outstanding Sound Mixing for a Variety Series or Special	Chris Hardwick
Outstanding Sound Editing for a Nonfiction or Reality Program (Single or Multi-Camera)	Chris Hardwick
Outstanding Structured Reality Program	Bob the Drag Queen; Eureka; Shangela
Outstanding Picture Editing for an Unstructured Reality Program	Bob the Drag Queen; Eureka; Shangela
Outstanding Casting for a Reality Program	Bob the Drag Queen; Eureka; Shangela
In Memoriam segment	Not applicable
Outstanding Host for a Reality or Competition Program	Bill Nye
Outstanding Hosted Nonfiction Series or Special	Bill Nye
Outstanding Picture Editing for a Nonfiction Program	Bill Nye
Outstanding Technical Direction, Camerawork, Video Control for a Series	Christine Chiu; Kevin Kreider
Outstanding Technical Direction, Camerawork, Video Control for a Special	Christine Chiu; Kevin Kreider
Outstanding Sound Mixing for a Nonfiction or Reality Program (Single or Multi-Camera)	Christine Chiu; Kevin Kreider
Outstanding Documentary or Nonfiction Special	Diallo Riddle; Bashir Salahuddin
Outstanding Writing for a Nonfiction Program	Diallo Riddle; Bashir Salahuddin
Exceptional Merit in Documentary Filmmaking	Diallo Riddle; Bashir Salahuddin
Outstanding Variety Special (Live)	Chip Gaines; Joanna Gaines
Outstanding Directing for a Variety Special	Chip Gaines; Joanna Gaines
Outstanding Animated Program	Chip Gaines; Joanna Gaines

Sunday, September 4
Category	Presenter(s)
Outstanding Casting for a Comedy Series	Marcia Gay Harden
Outstanding Casting for a Drama Series	Marcia Gay Harden
Outstanding Casting for a Limited or Anthology Series or Movie	Marcia Gay Harden
Outstanding Period Costumes	Rachel Bloom
Outstanding Contemporary Costumes	Rachel Bloom
Outstanding Fantasy/Sci-Fi Costumes	Rachel Bloom
Outstanding Period and/or Character Hairstyling	Jane Lynch
Outstanding Multi-Camera Picture Editing for a Comedy Series	Jane Lynch
Outstanding Choreography for Scripted Programming	Jane Lynch
Outstanding Sound Mixing for a Limited or Anthology Series or Movie	Coral Peña; Shantel VanSanten
Outstanding Sound Mixing for a Comedy or Drama Series (One Hour)	Coral Peña; Shantel VanSanten
Outstanding Sound Mixing for a Comedy or Drama Series (Half-Hour) and Animation	Coral Peña; Shantel VanSanten
Outstanding Guest Actress in a Comedy Series	Jane Levy
Outstanding Cinematography for a Single-Camera Series (Half-Hour)	Jane Levy
Outstanding Cinematography for a Single-Camera Series (One Hour)	Jane Levy
Outstanding Guest Actress in a Drama Series	Ryan Broussard; James Caverly
Outstanding Special Visual Effects in a Season or a Movie	Ryan Broussard; James Caverly
Outstanding Special Visual Effects in a Single Episode	Ryan Broussard; James Caverly
Outstanding Stunt Coordination for a Comedy Series or Variety Program	Jeanette "JJ" Branch; Niecy Nash
Outstanding Stunt Coordination for a Drama Series, Limited or Anthology Series or Movie	Jeanette "JJ" Branch; Niecy Nash
Outstanding Stunt Performance	Jeanette "JJ" Branch; Niecy Nash
Outstanding Period and/or Character Makeup (Non-Prosthetic)	Ashley Nicole Black; Sam Richardson
Outstanding Contemporary Makeup (Non-Prosthetic)	Ashley Nicole Black; Sam Richardson
Outstanding Prosthetic Makeup	Ashley Nicole Black; Sam Richardson
Outstanding Production Design for a Narrative Period or Fantasy Program (One Hour or More)	Jon Huertas
Outstanding Production Design for a Narrative Contemporary Program (One Hour or More)	Jon Huertas
Outstanding Production Design for a Narrative Program (Half-Hour)	Jon Huertas
Outstanding Single-Camera Picture Editing for a Drama Series	Simone Missick
Outstanding Single-Camera Picture Editing for a Comedy Series	Simone Missick
Outstanding Single-Camera Picture Editing for a Limited or Anthology Series or Movie	Simone Missick
Outstanding Main Title Design	Jason Sklar; Randy Sklar
Outstanding Guest Actor in a Comedy Series	Jason Sklar; Randy Sklar
Outstanding Motion Design	Jason Sklar; Randy Sklar
Outstanding Original Music and Lyrics	Skylar Astin
Outstanding Music Composition for a Limited or Anthology Series, Movie or Special (Original Dramatic Score)	Skylar Astin
Outstanding Music Supervision	Skylar Astin
In Memoriam segment	Not applicable
Outstanding Sound Editing for a Comedy or Drama Series (One Hour)	Colman Domingo
Outstanding Sound Editing for a Limited or Anthology Series, Movie or Special	Colman Domingo
Outstanding Sound Editing for a Comedy or Drama Series (Half-Hour) and Animation	Colman Domingo
Outstanding Guest Actor in a Drama Series	Angela Sarafyan
Outstanding Music Composition for a Series (Original Dramatic Score)	Angela Sarafyan
Outstanding Original Main Title Theme Music	Angela Sarafyan
Outstanding Actress in a Short Form Comedy or Drama Series	Melissa Fumero
Outstanding Actor in a Short Form Comedy or Drama Series	Melissa Fumero
Outstanding Contemporary Hairstyling	Melissa Fumero
Outstanding Cinematography for a Multi-Camera Series	Ralph Macchio; William Zabka
Outstanding Cinematography for a Limited or Anthology Series or Movie	Ralph Macchio; William Zabka
Outstanding Television Movie	Ralph Macchio; William Zabka

== Ceremony information ==
In April 2022, the Academy of Television Arts & Sciences announced that the 74th Primetime Creative Arts Emmy Awards would be held on September 3 and 4, leading into the 74th Primetime Emmy Awards on September 12. Nominations for the awards were announced on July 12. The first night of awards focused on unscripted, variety, and animated programming, while the second night focused on scripted programs. For the first time since 2019, the ceremonies were held at the Microsoft Theater in Downtown Los Angeles; the ceremonies had been held elsewhere the previous two years due to the COVID-19 pandemic. Additionally, the ceremonies were followed by the Governors Galas for the first time since before the pandemic. The two nights were edited into a single broadcast shown on FXX on September 10 and made available later on Hulu.

The event used a mix of tables and theater seating; producer Bob Bain explained that the tables aimed to create a "nightclub environment". Additionally, satellite stages were positioned to shorten walks for some winners. To keep each ceremony around two and a half hours, the producers opted to go hostless, instead using short monologues and comedy bits from presenters. To comply with COVID-19 protocols, all production members and attendees were required to show a negative COVID-19 test before the event.

=== Category and rule changes ===
Changes for the Creative Arts categories this year included:

- Comedy and drama series designations were no longer based on runtime; instead, producers decided where to submit programs, subject to Television Academy review.
- The categories for Outstanding Interactive Program and Outstanding Innovation in Interactive Programming were eliminated. Interactive programs were eligible for submission in other categories.
- Outstanding Stunt Coordination was split back into Outstanding Stunt Coordination for a Comedy Series or Variety Program and Outstanding Stunt Coordination for a Drama Series, Limited or Anthology Series or Movie.
- Outstanding Technical Direction, Camerawork, Video Control for a Special, Outstanding Lighting Design / Lighting Direction for a Variety Series, and Outstanding Lighting Design / Lighting Direction for a Variety Special became area awards.
- The names for Outstanding Hairstyling for a Variety, Nonfiction or Reality Program and Outstanding Makeup for a Variety, Nonfiction or Reality Program were updated, and both were shifted to juried awards.
- Any films placed on the Academy of Motion Picture Arts and Sciences platform became ineligible for the Emmys (previously, this rule only applied to non-documentary films).

In addition, several categories were moved between the main and Creative Arts broadcasts. Outstanding Variety Special (Live) and Outstanding Variety Special (Pre-Recorded) were moved to the Creative Arts ceremonies, while Outstanding Writing for a Variety Special replaced Outstanding Writing for a Variety Series in the main broadcast.
