= Norm Macdonald: Nothing Special =

2022 Netflix stand-up special

- Promotional release poster
- Directed by: Norm Macdonald; Jeff Tomsic
- Written by: Norm Macdonald
- Starring: Norm Macdonald
- Cinematography: Jordan Levy; Dylan Sanford
- Edited by: Clark Burnett; Lane Farnham
- Distributed by: Netflix
- Release date: May 30, 2022
- Running time: 86 minutes
- Country: United States

Norm Macdonald: Nothing Special is a stand-up comedy special featuring Norm Macdonald, consisting of 50 minutes of previously unreleased material recorded by Macdonald in June 2020, and a half-hour roundtable discussion featuring his friends and colleagues reflecting on his life and career. It was released on Netflix on May 30, 2022, eight months after Macdonald's death from acute leukemia.

The special earned three Primetime Emmy Award nominations for Outstanding Variety Special (Pre-Recorded), Outstanding Writing for a Variety Special, and Outstanding Directing for a Variety Special, marking Macdonald's first Primetime Emmy nominations.

== Cast ==
- Norm Macdonald
- Dave Chappelle
- David Letterman
- Conan O'Brien
- Adam Sandler
- Molly Shannon
- David Spade

== Production ==
Macdonald had planned to tape the material with a live audience at a venue in Los Angeles, but owing to his health challenges and the COVID-19 pandemic, he elected to record the material alone in the apartment of his producing partner Lori Jo Hoekstra to ensure it would be available to view. Hoekstra commented: "While this version of Nothing Special was not originally meant to be the final product, COVID restrictions prevented him from filming in front of an audience. We want to make sure his fans see this very funny hour. He left this gift for all of us." Macdonald recorded the material on June 28, 2020, not long after his multiple myeloma had returned from remission and metastasized into myelodysplastic syndrome.

The concluding roundtable discussion, which features several of Macdonald's friends and collaborators commenting on the special and Macdonald's life, was taped during the May 2022 "Netflix Is a Joke" festival.

== Reception ==
=== Critical response ===
On the review aggregator website Rotten Tomatoes, 100% of 10 critics' reviews are positive, with an average rating of 9.2/10. The website's consensus reads: "Norm Macdonald's parting standup set is as dry and unconventionally hilarious as fans could have hoped, and the specter of the comedian's encroaching mortality gives his characteristically unsentimental sendoff a powerful emotional undertow." Metacritic, which uses a weighted average, assigned the film a score of 78 out of 100, based on 6 critics, indicating "generally favorable" reviews.

=== Accolades ===
Year	Award	Category	Nominee(s)	Result	Ref.
2022	Hollywood Critics Association TV Awards	Best Comedy or Standup Special	Norm Macdonald: Nothing Special	Won	
2022	Primetime Creative Arts Emmy Awards	Outstanding Variety Special (Pre-Recorded)	Norm Macdonald, Lori Jo Hoekstra, Marc Gurvitz, John Irwin, and Casey Spira	Nominated	
2022	Primetime Creative Arts Emmy Awards	Outstanding Directing for a Variety Special	Norm Macdonald and Jeff Tomsic	Nominated	
2022	Primetime Emmy Awards	Outstanding Writing for a Variety Special	Norm Macdonald	Nominated	
2023	Critics' Choice Awards	Best Comedy Special	Norm Macdonald: Nothing Special	Won	
