= Charles Porlier =

Canadian make-up artist

Charles E. Porlier (born 1961) is a Canadian makeup artist and makeup effects teacher-lecturer.

Porlier was born in Calgary, Alberta, Canada and started his career as a child-puppeteer, inspired by, then meeting and learning from Jim Henson of the Muppets. After a brief period spent practicing stage magic, he turned to makeup artistry for films and television.

In 1995, Porlier, Kevin Haney, and Patricia Green won an Emmy Award for 'Outstanding Makeup for a Miniseries or Special' for Kissinger and Nixon starring Beau Bridges and Ron Silver, but no statue was awarded due to an incorrect screen credit. In 2000, Porlier, alongside Tom Woodruff, Alec Gillis, and Jeff Dawn were nominated for a Saturn Award (Science Fiction Academy) for best makeup for the Arnold Schwarzenegger film The 6th Day.

In 2003, Porlier was nominated twice for an Emmy Award in the same category, 'Outstanding makeup for a Miniseries or Special' for the television film Door to Door, starring William H. Macy, and the television miniseries Taken. Porlier, along with Matthew W. Mungle and Jayne Dancose won the award for 'Door to Door. In 2003, Porlier was nominated for a CNoMA Award for The Santa Clause 2, but won the CNoMA for Door to Door.
