= Eryn Krueger Mekash =

American make-up artist, producer and special effects artist

- Occupations: Make-up artist, producer, special effects artist
- Spouse: Mike Mekash

Eryn Krueger Mekash is an American make-up artist, producer and special effects artist. She was nominated for an Academy Award in the category Best Makeup and Hairstyling for the film Hillbilly Elegy. Mekash has also won eight Primetime Emmy Awards and been nominated for 39 more in the categories Outstanding Makeup (Non-Prosthetic) and Outstanding Prosthetic Makeup.

== Selected filmography ==
- Hillbilly Elegy (2020; co-nominated with Patricia Dehaney and Matthew W. Mungle)
