= Mike Elizalde =

Mexican-American special make-up effects artist

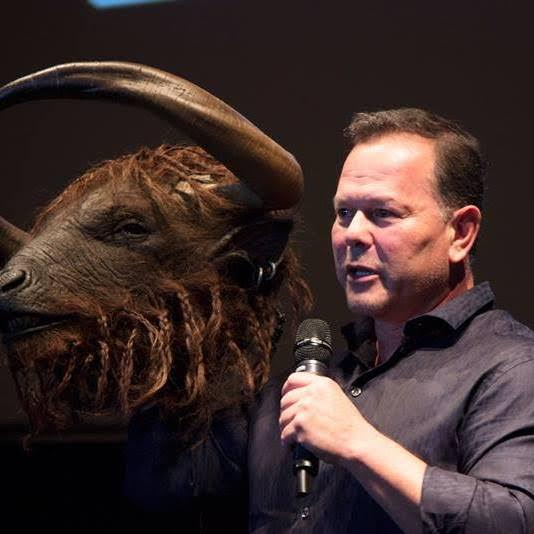
- Born: Winston Miguel Elizalde Torres; 1960 (age 65–66); Mazatlan, Sinaloa, Mexico
- Occupation: Special make-up effects artist
- Years active: 1987-present
- Spouse: Mary Elizalde (May 23, 1992-Present)
- Children: 2

Mike Elizalde (born 1960) is a Mexican-American special make-up effects artist. He was nominated at the 81st Academy Awards in the category of Best Makeup for his work on the film Hellboy II: The Golden Army. His nomination was shared with Thomas Floutz.

== Early life ==
Born Winston Miguel Elizalde Torres in Mazatlán, Sinaloa. His parents were Miguel Angel Elizalde and Paula Torres. He immigrated to the United States when he was five years old and grew up in Alhambra, California. As a child, Elizalde was interested in movie monsters, drawing them using found materials and trying to recreate make-up designs on himself.

While attending high school in Alhambra he spent time at the magic store Owen Magic Supreme, where he learned to work with his hands while learning how to perform magic. Alan Zagorsky, the current owner of the store, was his first mentor.

== Career ==
Elizalde taught himself to sculpt and create prosthetic makeup effects by following the work of Dick Smith, Stan Winston, and Rick Baker. After serving for eight years in the United States Navy, during which time he became a naturalized U.S. citizen, he returned to Hollywood, California to begin his career.

Elizalde worked at several Hollywood special effects studios, including Rick Baker's Cinovation Studios and Stan Winston Studio, learning to become an animatronics designer, puppeteer, and prosthetic makeup artist. In 1994, he and his wife Mary formed Spectral Motion, a design studio specializing in creature effects, prosthetic makeup, robotics, and animatronics.

He has worked on over 100 film and television projects in his career, including Men in Black, Nutty Professor II: The Klumps, Hellboy, Hansel and Gretel: Witch Hunters, Bright, Birdman, The Carbonaro Effect, Legends of Tomorrow, and Stranger Things.

Elizalde's company also collaborated with illusionist David Copperfield (illusionist).

In addition to his 81st Academy Awards nomination, Elizalde won a Saturn Award in 2004 for his work on Hellboy.

=== Affiliations ===
Elizalde is a Magician Member at The Academy of Magical Arts at the Hollywood Magic Castle and served as an officer (Secretary) on the Board of Directors from November 2016, through March 2018. He is also a member of The Academy of Motion Picture Arts and Sciences where he served on the Executive Committee for the Makeup Artists and Hairstylists branch for six years from 2009 until 2015. He is also a member of the International Alliance of Theatrical Stage Employees, Local 706, the Screen Actors Guild, and the Los Angeles County Museum of Art.
