= Stephen Prouty =

American makeup effects artist

Stephen Prouty is a makeup effects artist for film and television. He was nominated for the Academy Award for Best Makeup and Hairstyling for Jackass Presents: Bad Grandpa (2013).

== Recognition ==
=== Awards and nominations ===
- 2014, nominated for an Academy Award for 'Best Achievement in Makeup and Hairstyling' for Jackass Presents: Bad Grandpa
- 2014, won Hollywood Makeup Artist and Hair Stylist Guild Award for 'Best Special Makeup Effects - Feature Films' for Jackass Presents: Bad Grandpa (shared with Tony Gardner (designer))
- 2010, nominated for an Emmy Award for 'Outstanding Prosthetic Makeup for a Series, Miniseries, Movie or a Special' for Castle (Vampire Weekend episode)
- 2001, nominated for Hollywood Makeup Artist and Hair Stylist Guild Award for 'Best Special Makeup Effects - Television (For a Single Episode of a Regular Series - Sitcom, Drama or Daytime)' for Angel (Shroud of Ramon episode)
- 2000, nominated for an Emmy Award for 'Outstanding Makeup for a Series' for Angel (The Ring episode)
- 1995, nominated for an Emmy Award for 'Outstanding Individual Achievement in Makeup for a Series' for Earth 2 (After the Thaw episode)
