= Christopher Nelson (make-up artist) =

American make-up artist

Christopher Allen Nelson is an American make-up artist, VFX artist, writer and actor.

== Career ==
He is best known for his makeup and stylings for films such as Halloween, Halloween Kills, Halloween Ends, Kill Bill: Vol. 1, Pirates of the Caribbean: The Curse of the Black Pearl, Kill Bill: Vol. 2, Sin City, Thor: The Dark World, The Amazing Spider-Man, World War Z, Inherent Vice, Deadpool, Guardians of the Galaxy Vol. 2 and Suicide Squad (2016) has earned him numerous awards and nominations. His acting credits include the groom of Beatrix Kiddo in Kill Bill: Volume 2, Officer Francis, the cop with brownies in Halloween, and a serial killer in the 2008 Criminal Minds episode "Limelight".

He won two consecutive Primetime Emmy Award for Outstanding Makeup for a Limited Series or a Movie (Non-Prosthetic) and Outstanding Prosthetic Makeup for a Series, Limited Series, Movie or a Special for American Horror Story: Freak Show, and for Suicide Squad, he received an Academy Award for Best Makeup and Hairstyling at 89th Academy Awards.

== Awards and nominations ==
- 2014–2015: Primetime Emmy Award for Outstanding Makeup for a Limited Series or a Movie (Non-Prosthetic) and Outstanding Prosthetic Makeup for a Series, Limited Series, Movie or a Special – American Horror Story: Freak Show
- 2016: Academy Award for Best Makeup and Hairstyling – Suicide Squad with Alessandro Bertolazzi and Giorgio Gregorini.
