= John E. Jackson (make-up artist) =

American make-up artist

- Occupation: makeup artist
- Years active: 1991-present

John E. Jackson is an American make-up artist who won at the 75th Academy Awards for the film Frida. This was in the category of Best Makeup. He shared his win with Beatrice De Alba.

== Selected filmography ==
- The Town (2010)
- Gone Baby Gone (2007)
- Sky High (2005)
- Frida (2002)
- American History X (1998)
- Austin Powers: International Man of Mystery (1997)
- Ace Ventura: When Nature Calls (1994)
