= Christien Tinsley =

American make-up artist

Christien Tinsley (born May 4, 1974) is an American make-up artist.

Tinsley was nominated for an Academy Award for Best Makeup for his work in The Passion of the Christ (2004). He won an Academy Award for Technical Achievement in 2008 "for the creation of the transfer techniques for creating and applying 2D and 3D makeup known as Tinsley Transfers". He won the National Film Award in 2009 for best make up for the 2009 Bollywood film Paa. Tinsley is also nominated for the 2012 Primetime Emmy Award for Outstanding Prosthetic Makeup for a Series, Miniseries, Movie or a Special for American Horror Story. His other credits include Westworld and Santa Clarita Diet.
