= Thomas Floutz =

American make-up artist

- Occupation: Make-up artist

Thomas Floutz is an American make-up artist and special effects artist. He was nominated for an Academy Award in the category Best Makeup and Hairstyling for the film Hellboy II: The Golden Army.

In addition to his Academy Award nomination, he won two Primetime Emmy Awards and was nominated for seven more in the category Outstanding Makeup for his work on the television programs Alex Haley's Queen, Six Feet Under, Grey's Anatomy, Westworld, American Crime Story and The Pitt.

== Selected filmography ==
- Hellboy II: The Golden Army (2008; co-nominated with Mike Elizalde)
