= Silvina Knight =

American make-up artist

- Occupation: Make-up artist
- Spouse: Wyatt Knight (died. 2011)

Silvina Knight is an American make-up artist. She has won two Primetime Emmy Awards, in 2016 for American Horror Story: Hotel and in 2018 for The Assassination of Gianni Versace, and has been nominated for thirteen more in the category Outstanding Makeup.
