= Mike Mekash =

American make-up artist

- Occupation: Make-up artist
- Spouse: Eryn Krueger Mekash

Mike Mekash is an American make-up artist. He has won six Primetime Emmy Awards and has been nominated for eighteen more in the category Outstanding Makeup. In 2022 he won a Primetime Emmy Award for his work on the television program Stranger Things.
