= 59th Primetime Creative Arts Emmy Awards =

2007 American television programming awards

- Date: September 8, 2007
- Location: Shrine Auditorium; Los Angeles, California
- Presented by: Academy of Television Arts & Sciences
- Hosted by: Carlos Mencia
- Most awards: Bury My Heart at Wounded Knee (5)
- Most nominations: Bury My Heart at Wounded Knee (11)

Television/radio coverage
- Network: E!
- Produced by: Lee Miller; John Moffitt; Spike Jones Jr.
- Directed by: Chris Donovan

The 59th Primetime Creative Arts Emmy Awards honored the best in artistic and technical achievement in American prime time television programming from June 1, 2006, until May 31, 2007, as chosen by the Academy of Television Arts & Sciences. The awards were presented on September 8, 2007, in a ceremony hosted by Carlos Mencia at the Shrine Auditorium in Los Angeles, California. The ceremony was broadcast by E! on September 15, preceding the 59th Primetime Emmy Awards on September 16. A total of 80 Creative Arts Emmys were presented across 66 categories.

Bury My Heart at Wounded Knee received five wins from 11 nominations, leading all programs in both wins and nominations. Planet Earth and Tony Bennett: An American Classic tied for the second-most awards with four each, followed by Jane Eyre, Rome, and When the Levees Broke: A Requiem in Four Acts with three each. The 60th Annual Tony Awards, Ghosts of Abu Ghraib, Kathy Griffin: My Life on the D-List, A Lion in the House, Nick News with Linda Ellerbee, Planet Earth, South Park, When the Levees Broke, and Where's Lazlo? won Emmys in their respective overall program fields. HBO was the most-recognized network, receiving 15 awards from 53 nominations.

== Winners and nominees ==
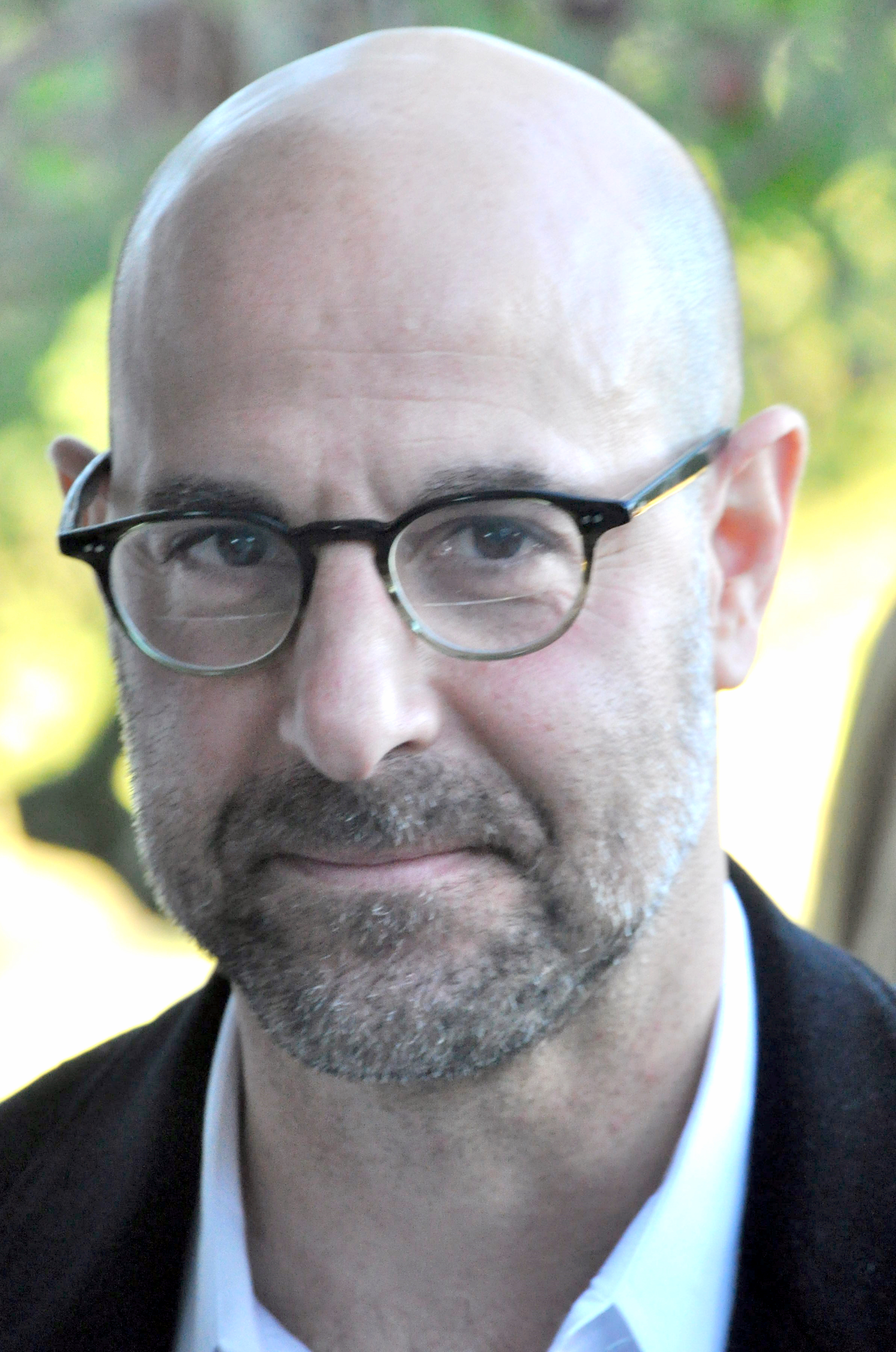
Stanley Tucci, Outstanding Guest Actor in a Comedy Series winner

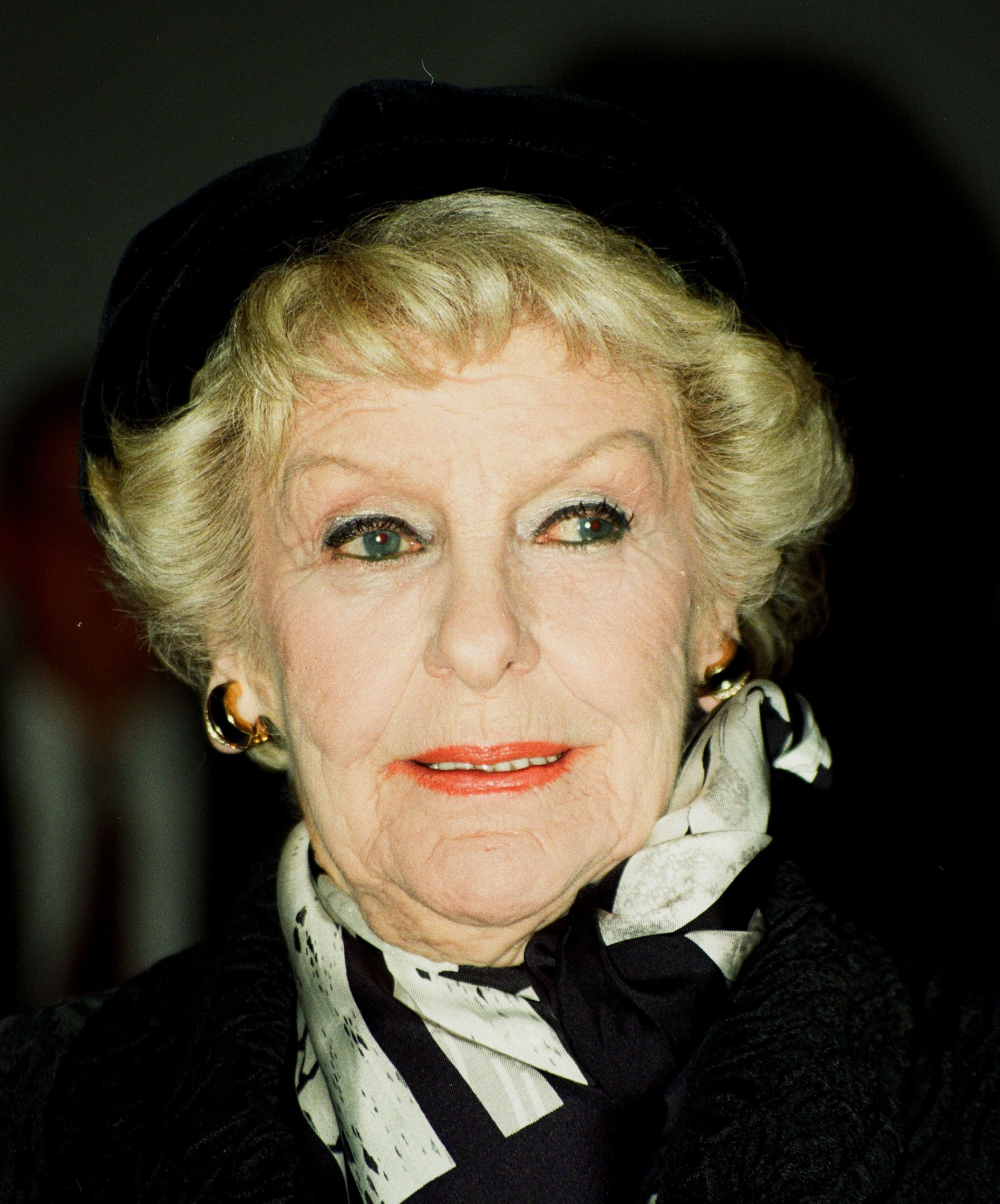
Elaine Stritch, Outstanding Guest Actress in a Comedy Series winner

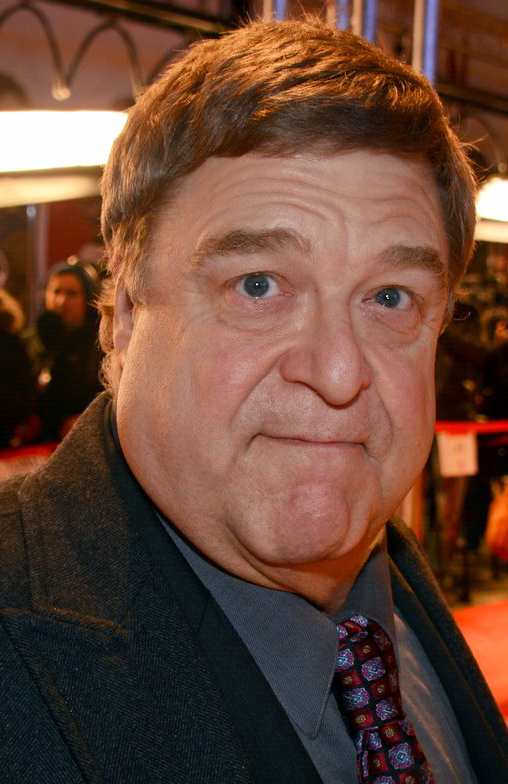
John Goodman, Outstanding Guest Actor in a Drama Series winner

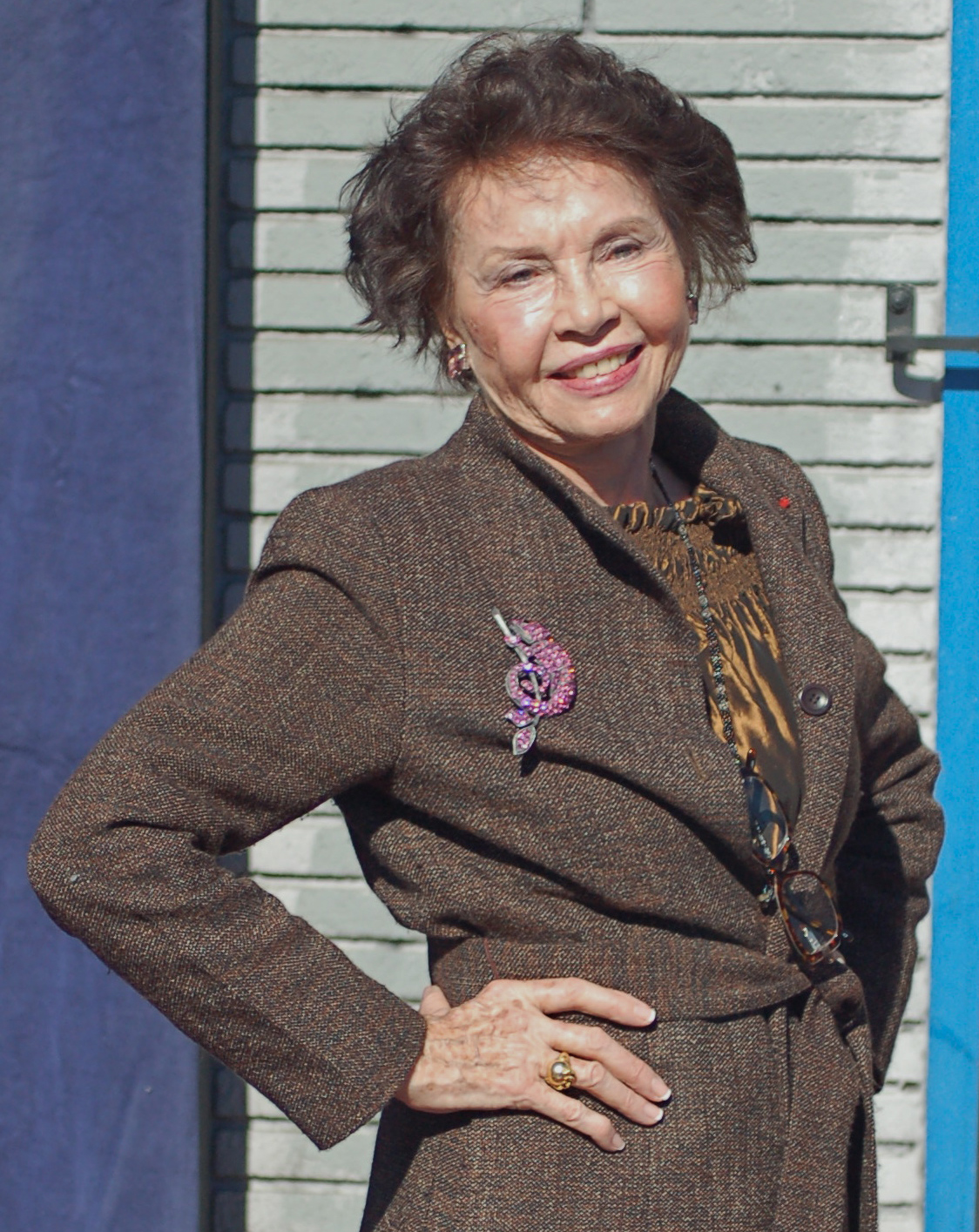
Leslie Caron, Outstanding Guest Actress in a Drama Series winner

Winners are listed first, highlighted in boldface, and indicated with a double dagger (‡). (Note: The outlets listed for each program are the U.S. broadcasters or streaming services identified in the nominations, which for some international productions are different than the broadcaster(s) that originally commissioned the program.) Sections are based upon the categories listed in the 2006–2007 Emmy rules and procedures. Area awards and juried awards are denoted next to the category names as applicable. (Note: Area awards are non-competitive and nominees are considered on their own terms. Any nominee with at least two-thirds approval received an Emmy. If no nominee received two-thirds approval, the nominee with the highest approval (and a minimum majority approval) received an Emmy.; Juried awards generally do not have nominations; instead, all entrants were screened before members of the appropriate peer group, and one, more than one, or no entry was awarded an Emmy based on the jury's vote.) For simplicity, producers who received nominations for program awards have been omitted.

=== Programs ===
Programs
**Outstanding Special Class Program (Area)**: **The 60th Annual Tony Awards (CBS)**‡; 79th Annual Academy Awards (ABC); The 64th Golden Globe Awards (NBC); Jerry Seinfeld – The Comedian Award (HBO); Prince Super Bowl XLI Halftime Show (CBS)	**Outstanding Children's Program (Area)**: **Nick News with Linda Ellerbee: Private Worlds: Kids and Autism (Nickelodeon)**‡; Hannah Montana (Disney Channel); The Suite Life of Zack & Cody (Disney Channel); That's So Raven (Disney Channel); When Parents Are Deployed (PBS)
**Outstanding Animated Program (For Programming Less Than One Hour)**: **South Park: "Make Love, Not Warcraft" (Comedy Central)**‡; Avatar: The Last Airbender: "City of Walls and Secrets" (Nickelodeon); Robot Chicken: "Lust for Puppets" (Cartoon Network); The Simpsons: "The Haw-Hawed Couple" (Fox); SpongeBob SquarePants: "Bummer Vacation / Wigstruck" (Nickelodeon)	**Outstanding Animated Program (For Programming One Hour or More) (Area)**: **Where's Lazlo? (Camp Lazlo) (Cartoon Network)**‡; Good Wilt Hunting (Foster's Home for Imaginary Friends) (Cartoon Network); Hellboy Animated: Sword of Storms (Cartoon Network); Secrets of the Deep (Discovery Channel)
**Outstanding Nonfiction Series (Area)**: **Planet Earth (Discovery Channel)**‡; American Masters (PBS); Biography (A&E); Deadliest Catch (Discovery Channel); Inside the Actors Studio (Bravo)	**Outstanding Nonfiction Special (Area)**: **Ghosts of Abu Ghraib (HBO)**‡; AFI's 100 Years...100 Cheers: America's Most Inspiring Movies (CBS); Blood Diamonds (The History Channel); Brando (TCM); Star Wars: The Legacy Revealed (The History Channel)
**Exceptional Merit in Nonfiction Filmmaking (Juried)**: **A Lion in the House (Independent Lens) (PBS)**‡; **When the Levees Broke: A Requiem in Four Acts (HBO)**‡; Jonestown: The Life and Death of Peoples Temple (American Experience) (PBS)	**Outstanding Reality Program**: **Kathy Griffin: My Life on the D-List (Bravo)**‡; Antiques Roadshow (PBS); Dog Whisperer with Cesar Millan (National Geographic); Extreme Makeover: Home Edition (ABC); Penn & Teller: Bullshit! (Showtime)
**Outstanding Creative Achievement in Interactive Television (Programming) (Juried) (Note: Finalists were announced for this juried category; they are not considered to be nominees.)**: **The Fallen Alternate Reality Game**‡; Big Brother Goes Mobile; DirecTV Interactive Sports; Heroes Interactive; The Jericho Experience

=== Performing ===
Performing
**Outstanding Guest Actor in a Comedy Series**: **Stanley Tucci – Monk as David Ruskin (USA)**‡; Beau Bridges – My Name Is Earl as Carl Hickey (NBC); Martin Landau – Entourage as Bob Ryan (HBO); Ian McKellen – Extras as himself (HBO); Giovanni Ribisi – My Name Is Earl as Ralph Mariano (NBC)	**Outstanding Guest Actress in a Comedy Series**: **Elaine Stritch – 30 Rock as Colleen Donaghy (NBC)**‡; Dixie Carter – Desperate Housewives as Gloria Hodge (ABC); Salma Hayek – Ugly Betty as Sofia Reyes (ABC); Judith Light – Ugly Betty as Claire Meade (ABC); Laurie Metcalf – Desperate Housewives as Carolyn Bigsby (ABC)
**Outstanding Guest Actor in a Drama Series**: **John Goodman – Studio 60 on the Sunset Strip as Judge Robert Bebe (NBC)**‡; Christian Clemenson – Boston Legal as Jerry "Hands" Espenson (ABC); Tim Daly – The Sopranos as J.T. Dolan (HBO); David Morse – House as Michael Tritter (Fox); Eli Wallach – Studio 60 on the Sunset Strip as Eli Weintraub (NBC); Forest Whitaker – ER as Curtis Ames (NBC)	**Outstanding Guest Actress in a Drama Series**: **Leslie Caron – Law & Order: Special Victims Unit as Lorraine Delmas (NBC)**‡; Kate Burton – Grey's Anatomy as Ellis Grey (ABC); Marcia Gay Harden – Law & Order: Special Victims Unit as Star Morrison (NBC); Elizabeth Reaser – Grey's Anatomy as Jane Doe (ABC); Jean Smart – 24 as Martha Logan (Fox)
**Outstanding Voice-Over Performance (Juried)** No award given

=== Animation ===
Animation
**Outstanding Individual Achievement in Animation (Juried)**
- **Avatar: The Last Airbender: "Lake Laogai" – Sang-Jin Kim (Nickelodeon)**‡
- **Billy & Mandy's Big Boogey Adventure (The Grim Adventures of Billy & Mandy) – Phil Rynda (Cartoon Network)**‡
- **Camp Lazlo: "Squirrel Secrets" – Sue Mondt (Cartoon Network)**‡
- **Class of 3000: "Eddie's Money" – David Colman (Cartoon Network)**‡
- **Eloise: "Me, Eloise" – James McDermott (Starz Kids & Family)**‡
- **Family Guy: "No Chris Left Behind" – Steve Fonti (Fox)**‡
- **Good Wilt Hunting (Foster's Home for Imaginary Friends) – Dave Dunnet (Cartoon Network)**‡
- **Moral Orel: "The Lord's Prayer" – Sihanouk Mariona (Cartoon Network)**‡
- **My Gym Partner's a Monkey: "The Big Field Trip" – Narina Sokolova (Cartoon Network)**‡
- **Robot Chicken: "Lust for Puppets" – Thomas Smith (Cartoon Network)**‡

=== Art Direction ===
Art Direction
**Outstanding Art Direction for a Multi-Camera Series**: **How I Met Your Mother: "Aldrin Justice" / "Something Borrowed" / "Something Blue" – Steve Olson and Susan Eschelbach (CBS)**‡; The Class: "Pilot" – Glenda Rovello and Peter Gurski (CBS)	**Outstanding Art Direction for a Single-Camera Series**: **Rome: "Heroes of the Republic" / "Philippi" / "Deus Impeditio Esuritori Nullus" – Joseph Bennett, Anthony Pratt, Carlo Serafini, and Cristina Onori (HBO)**‡; Deadwood: "Tell Your God to Ready for Blood" / "True Colors" / "Amateur Night" – Maria Caso, David Potts, and Ernie Bishop (HBO); Heroes: "Genesis" – Curtis A. Schnell, Daniel J. Vivanco, and Crista Schneider (NBC); Shark: "Teacher's Pet" – Suzuki Ingerslev, Cat Smith, and Rusty Lipscomb (CBS); The Tudors: "Episode 101" – Tom Conroy, Alan Gilmore, and Eliza Solesbury (Showtime); Ugly Betty: "The Box and the Bunny" – Mark Worthington, Jim Wallis, and Archie D'Amico (ABC)
**Outstanding Art Direction for a Miniseries or Movie (Area)**: **Jane Eyre (Masterpiece Theatre) – Grenville Horner, Patrick Rolfe, and Clare Andrade (PBS)**‡; Broken Trail – Ken Rempel, Bill Ives, and Paul Healy (AMC); Bury My Heart at Wounded Knee – Ian Thomas, D.A. Menchions, and Paul Healy (HBO); Return to Halloweentown – Edward L. Rubin and Kenneth J. Kirchner (Disney Channel); The Starter Wife – Tracey Gallacher, Brian Edmonds, and Rolland Pike (USA)	**Outstanding Art Direction for Variety, Music or Nonfiction Programming (Area)**: **79th Annual Academy Awards – J. Michael Riva, Gregory Richman, and Tamlyn Wright (ABC)**‡; **Tony Bennett: An American Classic – John Myhre, Tomas Voth, and Barbara Cassel (NBC)**‡; Cirque Du Soleil: Corteo – Jean Rabasse (Bravo); Desperate Crossing: The Untold Story of the Mayflower – Katha Seidman and Kent Lanigan (The History Channel); Engineering an Empire: "Egypt" – Preeya Jensen (The History Channel); Hell's Kitchen: "Episode 210" – John Janavs, Robert Frye, and Dawn Sinko (Fox); MADtv: "Episode 1209" – John Sabato, D Martyn Bookwalter, and Daryn Reid Goodall (Fox)

=== Casting ===
Casting
**Outstanding Casting for a Comedy Series**: **Ugly Betty – Libby Goldstein and Junie Lowry Johnson (ABC)**‡; 30 Rock – Jennifer McNamara (NBC); Desperate Housewives – Junie Lowry Johnson and Scott Genkinger (ABC); Entourage – Sheila Jaffe and Georgianne Walken (HBO); Weeds – Amy McIntyre Britt and Anya Colloff (Showtime)	**Outstanding Casting for a Drama Series**: **Friday Night Lights – Linda Lowy, John Brace, and Beth Sepko (NBC)**‡; Brothers & Sisters – Jeanie Bacharach and Gillian O'Neill (ABC); Grey's Anatomy – Linda Lowy and John Brace (ABC); Studio 60 on the Sunset Strip – Elizabeth Barnes, Francine Maisler, and Liberman/Patton Casting (NBC); The Tudors – Nuala Moiselle, Frank Moiselle, Mary Jo Slater, and Steven Brooksbank (Showtime)
**Outstanding Casting for a Miniseries, Movie or a Special**: **Broken Trail – Wendy Weidman, Coreen Mayrs, Heike Brandstatter, Jackie Lind, and Fiorentino/Mangieri/Weidman Casting (AMC)**‡; Bury My Heart at Wounded Knee – Rene Haynes, Rhonda Fisekci, and Candice Elzinga (HBO); Jane Eyre (Masterpiece Theatre) – Di Carling (PBS); The Path to 9/11 – Meg Liberman, Cami Patton, Robin D. Cook, Nicole Hilliard-Forde, and Suzanne M. Smith (ABC); The Ron Clark Story – Gary M. Zuckerbrod, Lonnie Hamerman, Bonnie Finnegan, Rhonda Fisekci, and Candice Elzinga (TNT); The Starter Wife – Mary Jo Slater, Steven Brooksbank, and Tom McSweeney (USA)

=== Choreography ===
Choreography
**Outstanding Choreography (Area)**
- **So You Think You Can Dance: "Calling You" – Mia Michaels (Fox)**‡
- **So You Think You Can Dance: "Ramalama (Bang Bang)" – Wade Robson (Fox)**‡
- **Tony Bennett: An American Classic – John DeLuca and Rob Marshall (NBC)**‡
  - Dancing with the Stars: "Episode 303" – Louis Van Amstel (ABC)

=== Cinematography ===
Cinematography
**Outstanding Cinematography for a Multi-Camera Series**: **Two and a Half Men: "Release the Dogs" – Steven Silver (CBS)**‡; According to Jim: "Hoosier Daddy" – George Mooradian (ABC); Rules of Engagement: "Jeff's Wooby" – Wayne Kennan (CBS)	**Outstanding Cinematography for a Single-Camera Series**: **Rome: "Passover" – Alik Sakharov (HBO)**‡; CSI: Crime Scene Investigation: "Built to Kill (Part One)" – Michael Slovis (CBS); Deadwood: "Catbird Seat" – Joseph E. Gallagher (HBO); The Sopranos: "Soprano Home Movies" – Phil Abraham (HBO); Studio 60 on the Sunset Strip: "Pilot" – Thomas Del Ruth (NBC)
**Outstanding Cinematography for a Miniseries or Movie**: **Bury My Heart at Wounded Knee – David Franco (HBO)**‡; Broken Trail: "Part 1" – Lloyd Ahern (AMC); Jane Eyre (Masterpiece Theatre): "Part 1" – Mike Eley (PBS); The Path to 9/11: "Night 2" – Joel Ransom (ABC); The Valley of Light (Hallmark Hall of Fame Presentation) – Eric Van Haren Noman (CBS)	**Outstanding Cinematography for Nonfiction Programming**: **Planet Earth: "Pole to Pole" – Doug Allan, Martyn Colbeck, Paul Stewart, Simon King, Michael Kelem, and Wade Fairley (Discovery Channel)**‡; Deadliest Catch: "The Unforgiving Sea" – Doug Stanley, Zac McFarlane, Don Bland, Cameron Glendenning, Todd Stanley, and Eric Lange (Discovery Channel); Meerkat Manor: "Family Affair" – John Brown and Robin Smith (Animal Planet); This American Life: "God's Close-Up" – Adam Beckman (Showtime); When the Levees Broke: A Requiem in Four Acts – Cliff Charles (HBO)
**Outstanding Cinematography for Reality Programming**: **The Amazing Race: "I Know Phil, Little Ol' Gorgeous Thing" – Per Larsson, John Armstrong, Sylvester Campe, Petr Cikhart, Tom Cunningham, Chip Goebert, Bob Good, Peter Rieveschl, Dave Ross, Uri Sharon, and Alan Weeks (CBS)**‡; Dirty Jobs: "Mule Logger" – Douglas Glover, Troy Paff, and Christopher Whiteneck (Discovery Channel); Intervention: "Sylvia" – Chris Baron, Meri Pritchett, and Jamie Hall (A&E); Project Runway: "Iconic Statement" – Tony Sacco (Bravo); Top Chef: "Episode 209" – Craig Spirko and Gus Dominguez (Bravo)

=== Commercial ===
Commercial
**Outstanding Commercial**
- **"Animals" – Hungry Man and Ogilvy & Mather (American Express)**‡
  - "Battle" – Park Pictures and BBDO New York (Cingular)
  - "Happiness Factory" – Psyop and Wieden+Kennedy Amsterdam (Coca-Cola)
  - "Jar" – Partizan Entertainment and BBDO New York (GE)
  - "Pinball" – Partizan Entertainment and BBDO New York (Pepsi)
  - "Singing Cowboy" – MJZ and Arnold / Crispin Porter + Bogusky (Truth)
  - "Snowball" – MJZ and Fallon (Travelers)

=== Costumes ===
Costumes
**Outstanding Costumes for a Series**: **The Tudors: "Episode 103" – Joan Bergin, Ger Scully, and Jessica O'Leary (Showtime)**‡; Deadwood: "Amateur Night" – Katherine Jane Bryant and Le Dawson (HBO); Desperate Housewives: "Getting Married Today" – Catherine Adair, Karo Vartanian, and Joyce Unruh Goodwin (ABC); Rome: "De Patre Vostro (About Your Father)" – April Ferry, Augusto Grassi, and Uliva Pizzetti (HBO); Ugly Betty: "I'm Coming Out" – Eduardo Castro and Michael Chapman (ABC)	**Outstanding Costumes for a Miniseries, Movie or a Special**: **Jane Eyre (Masterpiece Theatre): "Part 1" – Andrea Galer and Sally Crees (PBS)**‡; Broken Trail: "Part 2" – Wendy Partridge and Kathleen Morley (AMC); Bury My Heart at Wounded Knee – Mario Davignon, Micheline Rouillard, and Jill Blackie (HBO); Longford – James Keast and Sarah Moore (HBO); The Starter Wife: "Part 1" – Marion Boyce, Debra McGuire, and Vanessa Loh (USA)
**Outstanding Costumes for a Variety/Music Program or a Special (Juried)**: **Tony Bennett: An American Classic – Colleen Atwood and Kendall Errair (NBC)**‡

=== Directing ===
Directing
**Outstanding Directing for Nonfiction Programming**
- **When the Levees Broke: A Requiem in Four Acts – Spike Lee (HBO)**‡
  - Ghosts of Abu Ghraib – Rory Kennedy (HBO)
  - Star Wars: The Legacy Revealed – Kevin Burns (The History Channel)
  - Thin – Lauren Greenfield (HBO)
  - This American Life: "God's Close-Up" – Christopher Wicha (Showtime)

=== Hairstyling ===
Hairstyling
**Outstanding Hairstyling for a Series**: **Rome: "De Patre Vostro (About Your Father)" – Aldo Signoretti, Stefano Ceccarelli, Claudia Catini, and Michele Vigliotta (HBO)**‡; Dancing with the Stars: "Episode 303" – Mary Guerrero, Lucia Mace, and Cynthia P. Romo (ABC); Deadwood: "A Constant Throb" – Peter Tothpal, Carol Pershing, and De'Ann Power (HBO); Desperate Housewives: "It Takes Two" – Gabor Heiligenberg, Dena Green, James Dunham, and Maria Fernandez (ABC); Ugly Betty: "I'm Coming Out" – Mary Ann Valdes, Lynda K. Walker, and Norma Lee (ABC)	**Outstanding Hairstyling for a Miniseries, Movie or a Special**: **Jane Eyre (Masterpiece Theatre) – Anne Oldham and Fay De Bremaeker (PBS)**‡; 79th Annual Academy Awards – Maria Valdivia, Anthony Wilson, and Cynthia P. Romo (ABC); Broken Trail – Penny-Lea Thompson (AMC); Bury My Heart at Wounded Knee – Iloe Flewelling, Chris Harrison, Heather Smith, and Penny-Lea Thompson (HBO)

=== Lighting Direction ===
Lighting Direction (Electronic Production)
**Outstanding Lighting Direction (Electronic, Multi-Camera) for Variety, Music or Comedy Programming**
- **49th Annual Grammy Awards – Robert A. Dickinson, Matt Firestone, and Andy O'Reilly (CBS)**‡
  - 79th Annual Academy Awards – Robert A. Dickinson, Robert Barnhart, and Andy O'Reilly (ABC)
  - American Idol: "The Finale" – Kieran Healy, George Harvey, and Harry Sangmeister (Fox)
  - Dancing with the Stars: "Episode 308" – Simon Miles (ABC)
  - Late Night with Conan O'Brien: "Episode 2408" – Fred Bock, Ronnie Skopac, and Eugene Meienhofer (NBC)

=== Main Title Design ===
Main Title Design
**Outstanding Main Title Design**
- **Dexter – Eric Anderson, Josh Bodnar, Lindsay Daniels, and Colin Davis (Showtime)**‡
  - Hu$tle – Joe Berger and Pascal Wyse (AMC)
  - The Lost Room – Thomas Cobb, Robert Bradley, and Patrick Loungway (Sci Fi Channel)
  - The Path to 9/11 – Matthew Mulder, Dave Molloy, Colin Day, and Lindsay Daniels (ABC)
  - Standoff – Michael Riley, Bob Swensen, Dan Meehan, and Brad Simmons (Fox)
  - Ugly Betty – Garson Yu and Yolanda Santosa (ABC)

=== Makeup ===
Makeup
**Outstanding Makeup for a Series (Non-Prosthetic)**: **Deadwood: "I Am Not the Fine Man You Take Me For" – John Rizzo, Ron Snyder, Bob Scribner, and Jim Scribner (HBO)**‡; CSI: Crime Scene Investigation: "Fannysmackin'" – Melanie Levitt, Tom Hoerber, Matthew Mungle, and Clinton Wayne (CBS); Dancing with the Stars: "Episode 303" – Melanie Mills, Zena Shteysel, Patti Ramsey Bortoli, and Nadege Shoenfeld (ABC); MADtv: "Episode 1210" – Jennifer Aspinall, Heather Mages, James Rohland, and David Williams (Fox); Rome: "De Patre Vostro (About Your Father)" – Maurizio Silvi, Francesco Nardi, Federico Laurenti, and Laura Tonello (HBO)	**Outstanding Makeup for a Miniseries, Movie or a Special (Non-Prosthetic)**: **Bury My Heart at Wounded Knee – Gail Kennedy, Rochelle Pomerleau, and Joanne Preece (HBO)**‡; Broken Trail – Debbie Vandelaar and Tania El Zahr (AMC); Desperate Crossing: The Untold Story of the Mayflower – Ronell Oliveri and Jason Allen (The History Channel); Nightmares & Dreamscapes: From the Stories of Stephen King – Angela Conte and Katherin Birch (TNT); The Starter Wife – Viv Mepham and Deborah Lanser (USA)
**Outstanding Prosthetic Makeup for a Series, Miniseries, Movie or a Special (Area)**: **House: "Que Sera Sera" – Dalia Dokter, Jamie Kelman, and Ed French (Fox)**‡; CSI: Crime Scene Investigation: "Living Legend" – Melanie Levitt, Tom Hoerber, Matthew Mungle, and Clinton Wayne (CBS); Grey's Anatomy: "My Favorite Mistake" – Norman Leavitt, Brigitte Bugayong, Tom Burman, and Bari Burman (ABC); MADtv: "Episode 1203" – Jennifer Aspinall, Heather Mages, James Rohland, and Randy Westgate (Fox); Nip/Tuck: "Conor McNamara" – Eryn Krueger, Stephanie Fowler, Bill Corso, Mary Kay Witt, Christopher Nelson, and Christien Tinsley (FX)

=== Music ===
Music
**Outstanding Music Composition for a Series (Original Dramatic Score)**: **Planet Earth: "Pole to Pole" – George Fenton (Discovery Channel)**‡; 24: "Day 6: 6:00 p.m. – 7:00 p.m." – Sean Callery (Fox); CSI: Crime Scene Investigation: "Law of Gravity" – John Keane (CBS); Ghost Whisperer: "Love Never Dies" – Mark Snow (CBS); Kidnapped: "Pilot" – W. G. Snuffy Walden (NBC); Rome: "Philippi" – Jeff Beal (HBO)	**Outstanding Music Composition for a Miniseries, Movie or a Special (Original Dramatic Score)**: **Nightmares & Dreamscapes: From the Stories of Stephen King: "Battleground" – Jeff Beal (TNT)**‡; Boffo! Tinseltown's Bombs and Blockbusters – Todd Boekelheide (HBO); Broken Trail – David Mansfield and Van Dyke Parks (AMC); Bury My Heart at Wounded Knee – George S. Clinton (HBO); The Librarian: Return to King Solomon's Mines – Joseph LoDuca (TNT); Longford – Rob Lane (HBO); The Path to 9/11 – John Cameron (ABC)
**Outstanding Music Direction**: **79th Annual Academy Awards – William Ross (ABC)**‡; Dancing with the Stars: "Episode 310" – Harold Wheeler (ABC); Scrubs: "My Musical" – Jan Stevens (NBC); The 60th Annual Tony Awards – Elliot Lawrence (CBS)	**Outstanding Original Music and Lyrics**: **Saturday Night Live: "Host: Justin Timberlake" – "Dick in a Box" by Justin Timberlake, Jorma Taccone, Katreese Barnes, Asa Taccone, Akiva Schaffer, and Andy Samberg (NBC)**‡; Family Guy: "Peter's Two Dads" – "My Drunken Irish Dad" by Danny Smith and Walter Murphy (Fox); MADtv: "Episode 1209" – "Merry Ex-Mas" by Greg O'Connor, Jim Wise, and Bruce McCoy (Fox); Scrubs: "My Musical" – "Everything Comes Down to Poo" by Debra Fordham, Robert Lopez, and Jeff Marx (NBC); Scrubs: "My Musical" – "Guy Love" by Debra Fordham and Paul F. Perry (NBC)
**Outstanding Original Main Title Theme Music**: **The Tudors: "Episode 5" – Trevor Morris (Showtime)**‡; 30 Rock: "Hard Ball" – Jeff Richmond (NBC); Dexter – Rolfe Kent (Showtime); Hu$tle: "Episode 401" – Simon Rogers (AMC); On the Lot: "Episode 102A" – Mark T. Williams and Jeff Lippencott (Fox)

=== Picture Editing ===
Picture Editing
**Outstanding Single-Camera Picture Editing for a Drama Series**: **Dexter: "Dexter" – Elena Maganini (Showtime)**‡; Heroes: "Genesis" – Michael Murphy, Donn Aron, and Louise A. Innes (NBC); Lost: "Through the Looking Glass" – Stephen Semel, Mark J. Goldman, Henk Van Eeghen, and Christopher Nelson (ABC); The Sopranos: "The Second Coming" – Lynne M. Whitlock (HBO); The Sopranos: "Soprano Home Movies" – William B. Stich (HBO)	**Outstanding Single-Camera Picture Editing for a Comedy Series**: **The Office: "The Job" – David Rogers and Dean Holland (NBC)**‡; My Name Is Earl: "Guess Who's Coming Out of Joy" – Lance Luckey (NBC); My Name Is Earl: "The Trial" – William Marrinson (NBC); Weeds: "Crush Girl Love Panic" – William Turro (Showtime); Weeds: "Mrs. Botwin's Neighborhood" – David Helfand (Showtime)
**Outstanding Single-Camera Picture Editing for a Miniseries or a Movie**: **Bury My Heart at Wounded Knee – Michael Ornstein and Michael Brown (HBO)**‡; **The Path to 9/11: "Night 2" – Geoffrey Rowland, Eric Sears, Bryan Horne, David Handman, and Mitchell Danton (ABC)**‡; Broken Trail: "Part 2" – Freeman Davies and Philip Norden (AMC); Jane Eyre (Masterpiece Theatre): "Part 1" – Jason Krasucki (PBS); Life Support – Mary Jo Markey (HBO); The Starter Wife: "Part 3" – Robert Florio (USA)	**Outstanding Multi-Camera Picture Editing for a Series**: **Two and a Half Men: "Release the Dogs" – Joe Bella (CBS)**‡; American Idol: "Idol Gives Back" – Bill DeRonde, Oren Castro, Gus Comegys, John Cox, Patrick Franks, Narumi Inatsugu, Tim Perniciaro, Jeff Roe, and Ryan Tanner (Fox); The Daily Show with Jon Stewart: "Episode 12043" – Tonya Dreher, Graham Frazier, Mark Paone, Daric Schlesselman, Einar Westerlund, and Rob York (Comedy Central); Dancing with the Stars: "Episode 304" – Ned Kerwin, Pamela Malouf, David Timoner, and Hans van Riet (ABC); How I Met Your Mother: "Robin Sparkles" – Sue Federman (CBS)
**Outstanding Picture Editing for a Special (Single or Multi-Camera)**: **Cirque Du Soleil: Corteo – Sylvain Lebel (Bravo)**‡; 79th Annual Academy Awards – Michael Polito, Jeff Roe, Douglass M. Stewart Jr., Kyle Cooper, Neil Travis, Chuck Workman, and Steve Sidwell (ABC); Lewis Black: Red, White & Screwed – Jeff U'Ren (HBO); Tony Bennett: An American Classic – Wyatt Smith (NBC); A Tribute to James Taylor (Great Performances) – Gary Bradley and Laura Young (PBS)	**Outstanding Picture Editing for Nonfiction Programming**: **When the Levees Broke: A Requiem in Four Acts – Sam Pollard, Geeta Gandbhir, and Nancy Novack (HBO)**‡; AFI's 100 Years...100 Cheers: America's Most Inspiring Movies – Tim Preston, Debra Light, and Barry A. O'Brien (CBS); Deadliest Catch: "The Unforgiving Sea" – Kelly Coskran and Ed Greene (Discovery Channel); Ghosts of Abu Ghraib – Sari Gilman (HBO); Meerkat Manor: "Family Affair" – Renoir Tuahene (Animal Planet); Planet Earth: "Mountains" – Andrew Netley (Discovery Channel)
**Outstanding Picture Editing for Reality Programming**: **The Amazing Race: "I Know Phil, Little Ol' Gorgeous Thing" – Jon Bachmann, Steven Escobar, Eric Goldfarb, Julian Gomez, Andy Kozar, Paul Nielsen, and Jacob Parsons (CBS)**‡; American Idol: "Memphis Auditions" – Bill DeRonde, Gus Comegys, Cliff Dorsey, Ryan Tanner, Oren Castro, Narumi Inatsugu, and Tim Perniciaro (Fox); Extreme Makeover: Home Edition: "The Thomas Family" – Matt Deitrich, Wes Paster, Tenna Guthrie, Phil Stuben, Jason Cherella, Ben Daughtry, and Hilary Scratch (ABC); Project Runway: "Iconic Statement" – Kevin Leffler, Annie Tighe, Steve Lichtenstein, Drew Brown, Clark Vogeler, Andy Robertson, and Jillian Moul (Bravo); Survivor: "An Evil Thought" – Brian Barefoot, Bob Mathews, Eric Gardner, Chad Bertalotto, Fred Hawthorne, Tim Atzinger, and Evan Mediuch (CBS)

=== Sound Editing ===
Sound Editing
**Outstanding Sound Editing for a Series**: **24: "Day 6: 10:00 p.m. – 11:00 p.m." – William Dotson, Catherine Speakman, Jeffrey R. Whitcher, Pembrooke Andrews, Shawn Kennelly, Rick Polanco, Vic Radulich, Jeffrey Charbonneau, Laura Macias, and Vince Nicastro (Fox)**‡; Battlestar Galactica: "Exodus, Part 2" – Jack Levy, Daniel Colman, Vince Balunas, Michael Baber, Doug Madick, and Rick Partlow (Sci Fi Channel); CSI: Miami: "No Man's Land" – Tim Kimmel, Todd Niesen, Bradley C. Katona, Ruth Adelman, Skye Lewin, Zane Bruce, and Joseph Sabella (CBS); ER: "Bloodline" – Walter Newman, Bob Redpath, Darleen R. Stoker, Karyn Foster, Kenneth Young, Adam Johnston, Sharon Tylk-Gersh, Casey Crabtree, and Mike Crabtree (NBC); Lost: "A Tale of Two Cities" – Thomas deGorter, Paula Fairfield, Carla Murray, Maciek Malish, Jay Keiser, Joe Schultz, Geordy Sincavage, Alex Levy, Doug Reed, and Cynthia Merrill (ABC); Smallville: "Zod" – Michael E. Lawshe, Jeremy Gordon, Eric Hertsgaard, Timothy Cleveland, Eric Erickson, Marc Meyer, Paul Diller, Chris McGeary, Casey Crabtree, and Michael Crabtree (The CW)	**Outstanding Sound Editing for a Miniseries, Movie or a Special**: **Bury My Heart at Wounded Knee – Stephen Flick, Avram Gold, Steffan Falesitch, Eric Hertsgaard, Patricio Libenson, Denise Horta, Adam Johnston, Paul Berolzheimer, Dean Beville, Jeff Sawyer, Kenneth Young, Mike Flicker, David Lee Fein, and Hilda Hodges (HBO)**‡; Broken Trail: "Night 2" – Kevin Howard, Robert Hegedus, Richard Calistan, Clive Turner, P. Jason MacNeill, Steve Copley, Carl Sealove, John Sievert, and Virginia Storey (AMC); The Librarian: Return to King Solomon's Mines – Mark Friedgen, Joy Ealy, Kristi Johns, Burt Weinstein, Tim Terusa, Anton Holden, Bob Costanza, Rick Steele, Bill Bell, Jason Ruder, Tim Chilton, and Jill Sanders (TNT); The Path to 9/11: "Night 1" – G. Michael Graham, J. Michael Hooser, Bob Costanza, Bill Bell, Mike Dickeson, Kevin Fisher, Anton Holden, Adriane Marfiak, Mark Steele, Joy Ealy, Devon Curry, Dan Johnson, Tim Chilton, and Jill Sanders (ABC); Tsunami: The Aftermath: "Part 1" – Julian Slater, Paul Conway, Simon Price, Tony Currie, Peter Gates, Steve Browell, Ben Norrington, Stephen Griffiths, John Warhurst, John Fewell, and Julie Ankerson (HBO)
**Outstanding Sound Editing for Nonfiction Programming (Single or Multi-Camera)**: **Planet Earth: "Pole to Pole" – Kate Hopkins (Discovery Channel)**‡; The Amazing Race: "I Know Phil, Little Ol' Gorgeous Thing" – Jon Bachmann, Eric Goldfarb, Julian Gomez, Andy Kozar, Paul Nielsen, Jacob Parsons, and Rick Livingstone (CBS); American Masters: "Atlantic Records: The House That Ahmet Built" – Richard Fairbanks and Pamela Scott Arnold (PBS); Ghosts of Abu Ghraib – Margaret Crimmins and Greg Smith (HBO); When the Levees Broke: A Requiem in Four Acts – Fredric Rosenberg (HBO)

=== Sound Mixing ===
Sound Mixing
**Outstanding Sound Mixing for a Comedy or Drama Series (One-Hour)**: **CSI: Crime Scene Investigation: "Living Doll" – Mick Fowler, Yuri Reese, and Bill Smith (CBS)**‡; 24: "Day 6: 10:00 p.m. – 11:00 p.m." – Bill Gocke, Michael Olman, Kenneth Kobett, and Jeff Gomillion (Fox); Boston Legal: "Lincoln" – Clark King, David Rawlinson, and Peter R. Kelsey (ABC); Deadwood: "A Two-Headed Beast" – Geoffrey Patterson, R. Russell Smith, and William Freesh (HBO); Heroes: "Genesis" – Kenn Fuller, Gerry Lentz, and Richard Weingart (NBC); The Sopranos: "Stage 5" – Mathew Price, Kevin Burns, and Todd Orr (HBO)	**Outstanding Sound Mixing for a Miniseries or a Movie**: **Bury My Heart at Wounded Knee – George Tarrant, Rick Ash, and Edward C. Carr, III (HBO)**‡; Broken Trail: "Night 2" – Michael Playfair, Cory Mandel, and James Porteous (AMC); Jane Eyre (Masterpiece Theatre): "Part 1" – Richard Manton and Stuart Hilliker (PBS); Krakatoa: Volcano of Destruction – Frank Coakley, Marc Hatch, Nigel Heath, and Joe Powers (Discovery Channel); The Lost Room: "The Key and the Clock (Night 1)" – Bayard Carey, Rick Alexander, and Rich Rogers (Sci Fi Channel)
**Outstanding Sound Mixing for a Comedy or Drama Series (Half-Hour) and Animation (Area)**: **Entourage: "One Day in the Valley" – Steve Morantz, Dennis Kirk, and Mark Fleming (HBO)**‡; **Scrubs: "My Musical" – Joe Foglia, John W. Cook II, and Peter J. Nusbaum (NBC)**‡; 30 Rock: "Corporate Crush" – Griffin Richardson, Tony Pipitone, and Bill Marino (NBC); My Name Is Earl: "Our Cops Is On!" – Darin Knight, David Rawlinson, and Peter R. Kelsey (NBC); The Office: "The Coup" – Benjamin Patrick, John W. Cook II, and Peter J. Nusbaum (NBC)	**Outstanding Sound Mixing for a Variety or Music Series or Special (Area)**: **Tony Bennett: An American Classic – Dae Bennett, Sue Pelino, and Christopher Koch (NBC)**‡; 79th Annual Academy Awards – Ed Greene, Tom Vicari, Patrick Baltzell, Robert Douglass, and Jamie Santos (ABC); The Daily Show with Jon Stewart: "Episode 12061" – Tim Lester (Comedy Central); 49th Annual Grammy Awards – Tom Holmes, John Harris, Eric Schilling, Paul Sandweiss, Don Worsham, Klaus Landsberg, Mikael Stewart, Ron Reaves, Mike Parker, Dave Velte, and Bob LaMasney (CBS); The Magic Flute (Great Performances at the Met) – Jay David Saks and Ken Hahn (PBS)
**Outstanding Sound Mixing for Nonfiction Programming (Single or Multi-Camera)**: **American Masters: "Atlantic Records: The House That Ahmet Built" – Ed Campbell (PBS)**‡; The Amazing Race: "I Know Phil, Little Ol' Gorgeous Thing" – Jim Ursulak, Jerry Chabane, Dean Gaveau, Barry Weissman, Peter Wong, and Troy Smith (CBS); Deadliest Catch: "The Unforgiving Sea" – Bob Bronow (Discovery Channel); Planet Earth: "Pole to Pole" – Graham Wild (Discovery Channel); When the Levees Broke: A Requiem in Four Acts – Ken Ishii, Stuart Deutsch, Charles Hunt, Bo Walker, Bob Chefalas, and Doug Murray (HBO)

=== Special Visual Effects ===
Special Visual Effects
**Outstanding Special Visual Effects for a Series**: **Battlestar Galactica: "Exodus, Part 2" – Gary Hutzel, Michael Gibson, Doug Drexler, Adam "Mojo" Lebowitz, Jeremy Hoey, Tom Archer, Andrew Karr, Alec McClymont, and Brenda Campbell (Sci Fi Channel)**‡; Eureka: "Pilot" – Robert Habros, Matthew S. Gore, Darren Marcoux, Elizabeth Alvarez, Lane Jolly, Ben Funk, Tom Tennisco, Jarrod Davis, and Jamie Clark (Sci Fi Channel); Grey's Anatomy: "Walk on Water" – Sam Nicholson, Val Pfahning, Scott Ramsey, Anthony Ocampo, Michael Cook, Diego Galtieri, Eric Grenaudier, Adalberto Lopez, and Jason Gustafson (ABC); Heroes: "Five Years Gone" – Mark Kolpack, Mark Spatny, Gary D'Amico, Daniel Kumiega, Cedric Tomacruz, Diego Galtieri, Chris Martin, Ragui Hanna, and Jon Rosenthal (NBC); Rome: "Philippi" – James Madigan, Barrie Hemsley, Anna Panton, Merrin Jensen, Paula Pope, Daniel Acon, Duncan Kinnaird, Gary Brozenich, and Doug Larmour (HBO)	**Outstanding Special Visual Effects for a Miniseries, Movie or a Special**: **Nightmares & Dreamscapes: From the Stories of Stephen King: "Battleground" – Sam Nicholson, Eric Grenaudier, Mark Spatny, Adalberto Lopez, Michael Cook, Daniel Kumiega, Megan Omi, Ryan Wieber, and Marc van Buuren (TNT)**‡; Bury My Heart at Wounded Knee – David Goldberg, Chris Del Conte, Joseph Bell, Justin Mitchell, Erik Bruhwiler, Tommy Tran, Benoit Girard, Tammy Sutton, and Andrew Roberts (HBO); Drive: "The Starting Line" – Loni Peristere, Raoul Yorke Bolognini, Chris Jones, Jarrod Davis, Mark Shimer, Jamie Clark, Steve Meyer, Tyler Nathan, and Nate Overstrom (Fox.com) (Note: While Drive was broadcast on Fox, the relevant effects were released online because the series was cancelled before reaching the six-episode eligibility requirement. As a result, this nomination was the first broadband nominee at the Emmys. This also led to its nomination as a special, not a series.); Nightmares & Dreamscapes: From the Stories of Stephen King: "The End of the Whole Mess" – David Vana, Peter Stubbs, Vit Komrzy, Marc van Buuren, Monika Pavlickova, Jiri Linhart, Jaroslav Poklensky, Jan Heusler, and Jiri Forejt (TNT); The Path to 9/11: "Night 1" – Anthony Paterson, Tom Turnbull, Robert Crowther, Ian Britton, Tavia Charlton, Joel Skeete, Graham Cunningham, Andrew Nguyen, and Kristijan Danilovski (ABC); Secrets of the Deep – Tim Greenwood, Pete Farrer, Lorna Paterson, Antony Carysforth, Pete Metelko, Theo Facey, Adam Burnett, and Jason Horley (Discovery Channel)

=== Stunt Coordination ===
Stunt Coordination
**Outstanding Stunt Coordination**
- **CSI: Miami: "Rush" – Jim Vickers (CBS)**‡
  - 24: "Day 6: 2:00 p.m. – 3:00 p.m." – Jeff Cadiente (Fox)
  - CSI: NY: "Sleight Out of Hand" – Norman Howell (CBS)
  - ER: "Bloodline" – Gary Hymes (NBC)
  - Heroes: "Genesis" – Ian Quinn (NBC)

=== Technical Direction ===
Technical Direction
**Outstanding Technical Direction, Camerawork, Video for a Series**: **Saturday Night Live: "Host: Alec Baldwin and Musical Guest: Christina Aguilera" – Steven Cimino, John Pinto, Richard B. Fox, Brian Phraner, Barry Frischer, Eric A. Eisenstein, Susan Noll, and Frank Grisanti (NBC)**‡; American Idol: "Bon Jovi" – John Pritchett, Manny Bonilla, Bert Atkinson, John Repczynski, George Prince, Danny Bonilla, Alex Hernandez, Dave Eastwood, Bobby Highton, Ken Dahlquist, Bill Chaikowski, Damien Tuffereau, Danny Webb, Ed Horton, and Mark Sanford (Fox); Dancing with the Stars: "Episode 310" – Charles Ciup, Diane Biederbeck, Danny Bonilla, Dave Hilmer, James Karidas, Dave Levisohn, Hector Ramirez, Brian Reason, John Repczynski, Damien Tuffereau, Easter Xua, and Chuck Reilly (ABC); Jimmy Kimmel Live!: "Jay-Z Show" – Ervin D. Hurd, Parker Bartlett, Randy Gomez, Greg Grouwinkel, Mark Gonzales, Garrett Hurt, Ritch Kenney, Kris Wilson, Mike Malone, Marc Hunter, and Guy Jones (ABC); Late Night with Conan O'Brien: "Episode 2424" – Gregory Aull, Richard S. Carter, Kurt Decker, Eugene Huelsman, Chris Matott, James Palczewski, Pat Casey, Gregory Kasoff, and Carl M. Henry, III (NBC)	**Outstanding Technical Direction, Camerawork, Video for a Miniseries, Movie or a Special**: **American Idol: "Idol Gives Back" – John Pritchett, Rick Edwards, Damien Tuffereau, Suzanne Ebner, John Repczynski, George Prince, Easter Xua, Alex Hernandez, Dave Eastwood, Bobby Highton, Ray Gonzales, Vince Singletary, Bert Atkinson, Brian Reason, Ed Horton, Rob Vuona, Mike Tribble, Hector Ramirez, Brad Zerbst, Garrett Hurt, Danny Bonilla, Dave Hilmer, Allen Merriweather, Marc Hunter, Richard Strock, and Mark Sanford (Fox)**‡; 79th Annual Academy Awards – John B. Field, Kenneth Shapiro, Allan Wells, Ted Ashton, Robert Balton, Danny Bonilla, John Burdick, Dave Eastwood, Marc Hunter, Charlie Huntley, Dave Levisohn, Lyn Noland, Rob Palmer, Bill Philbin, David Plakos, Hector Ramirez, Brian Reason, Mark Whitman, Kris Wilson, Brett Crutcher, Aaron Fitzgerald, Dean Hall, Easter Xua, Chuck Reilly, Mark Sanford, and Keith Winikoff (ABC); Comic Relief 2006 – Keith Winikoff, Ted Ashton, Bill Chaikowski, Dave Eastwood, Larry Heider, Dave Hilmer, Dave Levisohn, Ken Patterson, Bill Philbin, Hector Ramirez, Gordi Saiger, and Mark Sanford (HBO); Dane Cook: Vicious Circle – Keith Winikoff, Robert Balton, John Burdick, Bob Del Russo, Manny Gutierrez, Charlie Huntley, John Mieklejohn, Jay Millard, Lyn Noland, Mark Renaudin, Carlos Rios, Jofre Rosero, Jim Scurti, David Smith, Ron Washburn, Mark Whitman, Matty Randazzo, and Bob Amour (HBO); 49th Annual Grammy Awards – John B. Field, Ted Ashton, Mike Breece, Dave Eastwood, Freddy Frederick, Hank Geving, Dean Hall, Larry Heider, Dave Hilmer, Ed Horton, Marc Hunter, Charlie Huntley, Dave Levisohn, Steve Martyniuk, Rob Palmer, Bill Philbin, Hector Ramirez, Brian Reason, Guy Jones, and Keith Winikoff (CBS); Prince Super Bowl XLI Halftime Show – Eric Becker, Dave Bernstein, Robert Balton, Danny Webb, Ray Hoover, John Burdick, Jofre Rosero, Mark Sanford, and Rob Levy (CBS); Tony Bennett: An American Classic – Terry Donohue, Sion Michel, Darin Moran, John Grillo, Thomas G. Tcimpidis, and Nick Theodorakis (NBC)

=== Writing ===
Writing
**Outstanding Writing for Nonfiction Programming**
- **American Masters: "Andy Warhol: A Documentary Film" – James Sanders and Ric Burns (PBS)**‡
  - Penn & Teller: Bullshit!: "Wal-Mart" – Penn Jillette, Teller, Sheryl Zohn, Jon Hotchkiss, Michael Goudeau, Star Price, Cliff Schoenberg, and David Weiss (Showtime)
  - Planet Earth: "Mountains" – Vanessa Berlowitz and Gary Parker (Discovery Channel)
  - Star Wars: The Legacy Revealed – Steven Smith, David Comtois, and Kevin Burns (The History Channel)
  - This American Life: "God's Close-Up" – Nancy Updike (Showtime)

=== Special awards ===
==== Governors Award ====
The Governors Award, recognizing an individual or group "whose works stand out with the immediacy of current achievement", was presented to two programs:

- American Idol's "Idol Gives Back" (Fox) was recognized for raising "more than $75 million to benefit relief programs for children and young people in extreme poverty in America and Africa".
- The Addiction Project (HBO) was "an unprecedented multi-platform and outreach campaign [...] aimed at helping Americans understand addiction as a chronic but treatable brain disease".

==== Outstanding Achievement in Engineering Development ====
One Emmy Award, four plaques, and one certificate of recognition were presented to recognize engineering achievements:

- The Charles F. Jenkins Lifetime Achievement Award was presented to Howard A. Anderson for his visual effects work.
- Plaques for Outstanding Achievement in Engineering Development went to TM Systems' QC Station, Osram Sylvania Products' OSRAM HMI Metal Halide Lamp Technology, Digital Vision's DVNR Image Processing Hardware-DVO Image Process Software, and Silicon Optix's Teranex Video Computer.
- A Certificate of Achievement, recognizing a historic contribution to television technology, was presented to Sycom for its work on the varicap.

==== Syd Cassyd Founders Award ====
The Syd Cassyd Founders Award was presented to Rich Frank, former television executive and president of the Television Academy, for his "significant positive impact on the Academy through [his] efforts and service over many years of involvement".

=== Nominations and wins by program ===
For the purposes of the lists below, any wins in juried categories are assumed to have a prior nomination.

Shows with multiple Creative Arts nominations
Nominations	Show	Network
11	Bury My Heart at Wounded Knee	HBO
10	Broken Trail	AMC
8	79th Annual Academy Awards	ABC
7	Dancing with the Stars	ABC
7	Jane Eyre (Masterpiece Theatre)	PBS
7	The Path to 9/11	ABC
7	Planet Earth	Discovery Channel
7	Rome	HBO
7	Ugly Betty	ABC
6	Deadwood	HBO
6	Tony Bennett: An American Classic	NBC
6	When the Levees Broke: A Requiem in Four Acts	HBO
5	24	Fox
5	American Idol	Fox
5	CSI: Crime Scene Investigation	CBS
5	Desperate Housewives	ABC
5	Grey's Anatomy	ABC
5	Heroes	NBC
5	My Name Is Earl	NBC
5	The Sopranos	HBO
5	The Starter Wife	USA
4	30 Rock	NBC
4	The Amazing Race	CBS
4	American Masters	PBS
4	Deadliest Catch	Discovery Channel
4	Ghosts of Abu Ghraib	HBO
4	MADtv	Fox
4	Scrubs	NBC
4	Studio 60 on the Sunset Strip	NBC
4	The Tudors	Showtime
3	49th Annual Grammy Awards	CBS
3	Dexter	Showtime
3	ER	NBC
3	Entourage	HBO
3	Star Wars: The Legacy Revealed	The History Channel
3	This American Life	Showtime
3	Weeds	Showtime
2	The 60th Annual Tony Awards	CBS
2	AFI's 100 Years...100 Cheers: America's Most Inspiring Movies	CBS
2	Avatar: The Last Airbender	Nickelodeon
2	Battlestar Galactica	Sci Fi Channel
2	Boston Legal	ABC
2	Cirque Du Soleil: Corteo	Bravo
2	CSI: Miami	CBS
2	The Daily Show with Jon Stewart	Comedy Central
2	Desperate Crossing: The Untold Story of the Mayflower	The History Channel
2	Extreme Makeover: Home Edition	ABC
2	Family Guy	Fox
2	Good Wilt Hunting (Foster's Home for Imaginary Friends)	Cartoon Network
2	House	Fox
2	How I Met Your Mother	CBS
2	Hu$tle	AMC
2	Late Night with Conan O'Brien	NBC
2	Law & Order: Special Victims Unit	NBC
2	The Librarian: Return to King Solomon's Mines	TNT
2	Longford	HBO
2	Lost	ABC
2	The Lost Room	Sci Fi Channel
2	Meerkat Manor	Animal Planet
2	Nightmares & Dreamscapes: From the Stories of Stephen King	TNT
2	The Office	NBC
2	Penn & Teller: Bullshit!	Showtime
2	Robot Chicken	Cartoon Network
2	Prince Super Bowl XLI Halftime Show	CBS
2	Project Runway	Bravo
2	Saturday Night Live	NBC
2	Secrets of the Deep	Discovery Channel
2	So You Think You Can Dance	Fox
2	Two and a Half Men	CBS

Shows with multiple Creative Arts wins
Wins	Show	Network
5	Bury My Heart at Wounded Knee	HBO
4	Planet Earth	Discovery Channel
4	Tony Bennett: An American Classic	NBC
3	Jane Eyre (Masterpiece Theatre)	PBS
3	Rome	HBO
3	When the Levees Broke: A Requiem in Four Acts	HBO
2	79th Annual Academy Awards	ABC
2	The Amazing Race	CBS
2	American Idol (Note: Including the Governors Award)	Fox
2	American Masters	PBS
2	Dexter	Showtime
2	Nightmares & Dreamscapes: From the Stories of Stephen King	TNT
2	Saturday Night Live	NBC
2	So You Think You Can Dance	Fox
2	The Tudors	Showtime
2	Two and a Half Men	CBS

=== Nominations and wins by network ===
Networks with multiple Creative Arts nominations
Nominations	Network
53	HBO
48	ABC
42	NBC
31	CBS
24	Fox
17	PBS
15	Discovery Channel
15	Showtime
12	AMC
11	Cartoon Network
7	Bravo
7	The History Channel
7	TNT
6	USA
5	Sci Fi Channel
4	Disney Channel
4	Nickelodeon
3	Comedy Central
2	A&E
2	Animal Planet

Networks with multiple Creative Arts wins
Wins	Network
15	HBO
12	NBC
9	CBS
8	Cartoon Network
7	Fox
6	PBS
4	ABC
4	Discovery Channel
4	Showtime
2	Bravo
2	Nickelodeon
2	TNT

== Presenters ==
The following individuals presented awards at the ceremony:

- Kristen Bell
- David Boreanaz
- Billy Ray Cyrus
- Miley Cyrus
- Tim Daly
- Josh Duhamel
- Omar Epps
- America Ferrera
- Tom Green
- Seth Green
- Greg Grunberg
- Marcia Gay Harden
- Neil Patrick Harris
- Bob Iger
- Rex Lee
- Mekhi Phifer
- Jennifer Morrison
- Rob Morrow
- Emily Procter
- Yeardley Smith
- Maura Tierney
- Stanley Tucci
- Blair Underwood
- Michael Urie
- Rainn Wilson

== Ceremony information ==
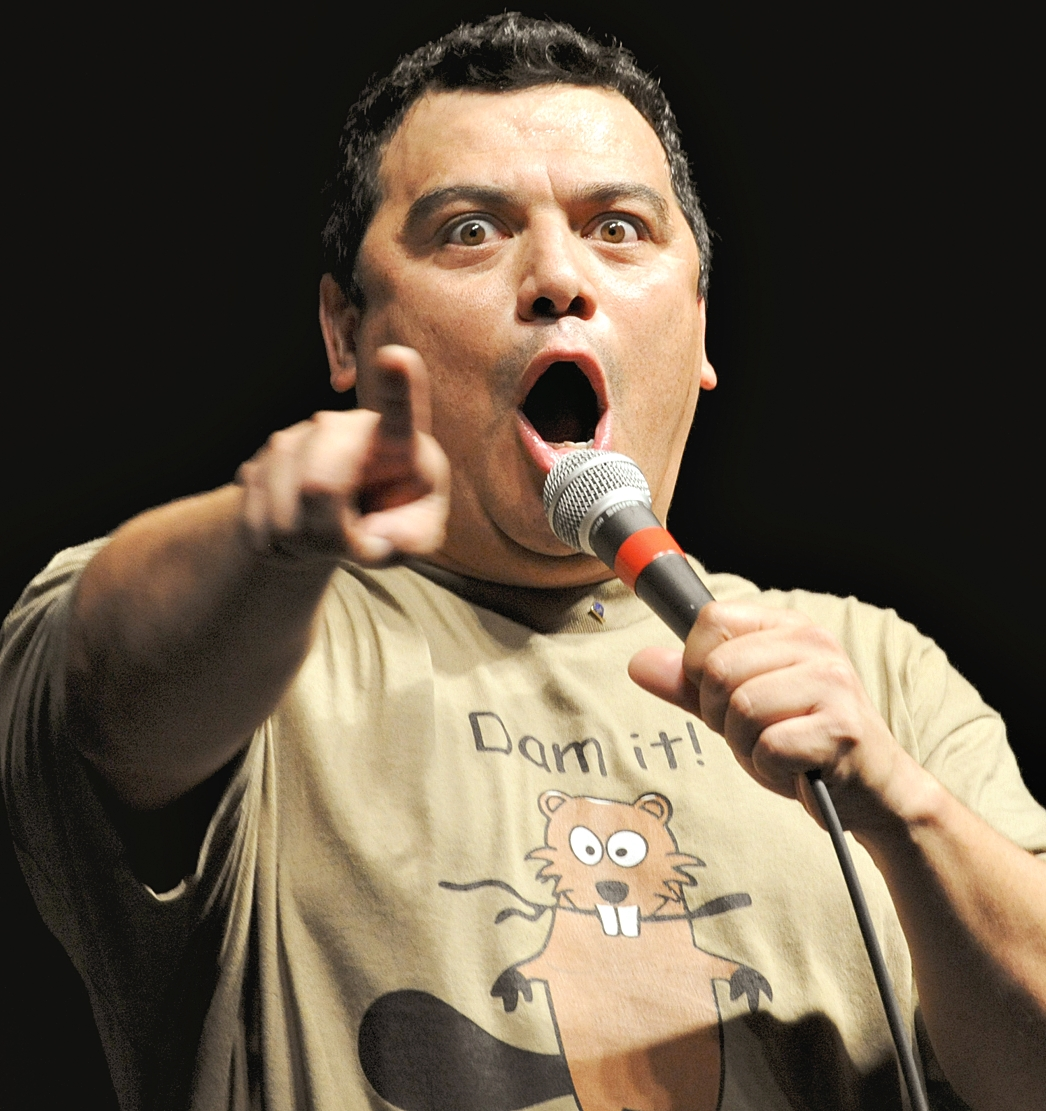
Carlos Mencia served as host for the ceremony.

The 59th Primetime Creative Arts Emmy Awards were executive produced by Lee Miller and John Moffitt, produced by Spike Jones Jr. through his company SJ2 Entertainment, and directed by Chris Donovan. Comedian Carlos Mencia was announced as the host in August. Nominations were announced on July 19, a week later than usual due to changes in voting rules. The awards were presented on September 8 in a four-hour ceremony at the Shrine Auditorium in Los Angeles, which was then edited into a two-hour broadcast shown on E! on September 15, the day before the main ceremony on Fox.

Major rule changes for this year's Creative Arts categories included:

- Public performances taped for television were moved from Outstanding Variety, Music, or Comedy Special to Outstanding Special Class Program.
- Broadband programs were allowed to compete in categories alongside cable and broadcast programs.
- Episodes of an eligible program airing outside of the eligibility window became qualified for awards in the same year that the program was competing. Previously, such episodes were ineligible for any awards.
