= Primetime Emmy Award for Outstanding Title Design =

Annual film award

Primetime Emmy Award for Title Design
- Awarded for: Outstanding Title Design
- Country: United States
- Presented by: Academy of Television Arts & Sciences
- Currently held by: Spider-Noir (2026)
- Website: emmys.com

This is a list of the winning and nominated programs of the Primetime Emmy Award for Outstanding Title Design presented for the best main title sequence in television programming. Prior to 1997, the award was presented for Outstanding Individual Achievement in Graphic Design and Title Sequences or Outstanding Graphic Design and Title Sequences. In the 1980s and early 1990s, the award was presented with the "possibility of one, more than one, or no award given," resulting in years where there were nominees without any winner or multiple winners.

== Winners and nominations ==
=== 1970s ===
| Year | Program | Designers | Network |
|---|---|---|---|
1976 (28th)
| 1976 (28th) | Addie and the King of Hearts | Norman Sunshine, graphic designer | CBS |
| 1976 (28th) | The Adams Chronicles | Girish Bhargava and Bill Mandel, graphic designers | PBS |
| 1976 (28th) | Eleanor and Franklin | Anthony Goldschmidt, graphic designer | ABC |
| 1976 (28th) | The New Original Wonder Woman | Phil Norman, graphic designer | ABC |
| 1976 (28th) | Saturday Night Live | Edie Baskin and Bob Pook, graphic designers | NBC |
1977 (29th)
| 1977 (29th) | The Bell Telephone Jubilee | Eytan Keller and Stu Bernstein, graphic designers | NBC |
| 1977 (29th) | Arthur Hailey's The Moneychangers | Phil Norman, graphic designer | NBC |
| 1977 (29th) | Previn and the Pittsburgh | Martine Sheon and David Summers, graphic designers | PBS |
| 1977 (29th) | Visions: The Gardener's Son | Gene Piotrowsky, graphic designer | PBS |
1978 (30th)
| 1978 (30th) | NBC: The First Fifty Years - A Closer Look | Bill Davis, graphic designer | NBC |
| 1978 (30th) | 50th Annual Awards of the Academy of Motion Pictures | Eytan Keller and Stu Bernstein, graphic designers | ABC |
| 1978 (30th) | Washington: Behind Closed Doors | Phill Norman, graphic designer | ABC |
| 1978 (30th) | Ziegfeld: The Man and His Women | Maury Nemoy, Robert Branham and John DeCuir, graphic designers | NBC |
1979 (31st)
| 1979 (31st) | Cinderella at the Palace | Stu Bernstein and Eytan Keller, graphic designers | CBS |
| 1979 (31st) | Vega$ | Phill Norman, graphic designer | ABC |

=== 1980s ===
| Year | Program | Designers | Network |
|---|---|---|---|
1980 (32nd)
| 1980 (32nd) | The French Atlantic Affair | Phill Norman, graphic designer | ABC |
| 1980 (32nd) | Salem's Lot | Gene Kraft, graphic designer | CBS |
1981 (33rd)
| 1981 (33rd) | Shōgun | Phill Norman, graphic designer | NBC |
| 1981 (33rd) | Freebie and the Bean | Gene Kraft, graphic designer | CBS |
| 1982 (34th) | Outstanding Individual Achievement - Graphic Design and Title Sequences (Note: As a juried award, nominees had to garner 50% approval to win the award. None of the nominees met the benchmark and no award was given.) | | |
| 1982 (34th) | Brideshead Revisited | Valerie Pye, graphic designer | PBS |
| 1982 (34th) | Fame | Michael Levine and Michael A. Hoey, graphic designers | NBC |
| 1982 (34th) | Late Night with David Letterman | Bob Pook, William Shortridge Jr. and Arlen Schumer, graphic designers | NBC |
| 1982 (34th) | Outstanding Individual Achievement - Creative Special Achievement | | |
| 1982 (34th) | Inside the Third Reich | Tim Donahue and William Mesa, graphic artists | ABC |
| 1982 (34th) | SCTV Network 90 | Alex Tkach, Michael C. Gross and Wayne Schneider, graphic artists | Syndicated |
| 1982 (34th) | Outstanding Individual Achievement - Informational Programming | | |
| 1982 (34th) | Hollywood: The Gift of Laughter | Bruce Bryant and James Castle, graphic artists | ABC |
| 1982 (34th) | Omni: The New Frontier | Richard L. Froman and Ron Hays, graphic artists | Syndicated |
1983 (35th)
| 1983 (35th) | Cheers | James Castle and Bruce Bryant, graphic designers | NBC |
| 1983 (35th) | Entertainment Tonight | John Ridgway, Pam Bloch and Harry Marks, graphic designers | Syndicated |
| 1983 (35th) | The Life and Adventures of Nicholas Nickleby | R.O. Blechman, Seymour Chwast and Andy Ewan, graphic designers | Syndicated |
| 1983 (35th) | Square Pegs | Edie Baskin and Jeff Carpenter, graphic designers | CBS |
| 1983 (35th) | The Scarlet and the Black | Phill Norman, graphic designer | CBS |
1984 (36th)
| 1984 (36th) | The Duck Factory | Ted Woolery and Gerry Woolery, graphic designers | NBC |
| 1984 (36th) | The 56th Annual Academy Awards | Bruce Bryant and James Castle, graphic designers | ABC |
1985 (37th)
| 1985 (37th) | Agatha Christie's Partners in Crime | John Tribe, graphic designer | PBS |
| 1985 (37th) | Friday Night Videos | Rocky Morton and Annabel Jankel, title designers; Dick Ebersol, executive producer | NBC |
| 1985 (37th) | Saturday Night Live | Alex Weil and Charles Levi, title sequence creators | NBC |
1986 (38th)
| 1986 (38th) | Stingray | Betty Green, graphic designer | NBC |
1987 (39th)
| 1987 (39th) | The Bronx Zoo | Wayne Fitzgerald and David Oliver Pfeil, graphic designers | NBC |
| 1987 (39th) | A Carol Burnett Special: Carol, Carl, Whoopi and Robin | Sandy Dvore, graphic designer | ABC |
1988 (40th)
| 1988 (40th) | Strong Poison: A Dorothy L. Sayers Mystery (Mystery!) | Liz Friedman, graphic designer | PBS |
| 1988 (40th) | Friday the 13th: The Series | Paul Boyington, graphic designer | Syndicated |
| 1988 (40th) | Moyers: God and Politics | Chris Kogler and David Chomowicz, graphic designers | PBS |
| 1988 (40th) | The Slap Maxwell Story | James Castle, Bruce Bryant, Carol Johnsen and Vic Lowrey, graphic designers | ABC |
1989 (41st)
| 1989 (41st) | Christmas at Pee Wee's Playhouse | Prudence Fenton, animation producer/director; Joel Fletcher, animator | CBS |
| 1989 (41st) | Just Say Julie | John Payson, designer | MTV |
| 1989 (41st) | Later with Bob Costas | John Semerad, Chris Harvey and Alex Weil, designers | NBC |
| 1989 (41st) | Now Hear This: MTV's Guide to New Music | Martin Brierley and Steven Lowe, designers/creators | MTV |
| 1989 (41st) | The Tracey Ullman Show | Jeff Boortz, designer/animator; Ed Sullivan, designer/producer; Billy Pittard, production designer | Fox |

=== 1990s ===
| Year | Program | Designers | Network |
|---|---|---|---|
1990 (42nd)
| 1990 (42nd) | Alive from Off Center | Jim Blashfield, designer; Robert Hoffmann, graphic designer | PBS |
| 1990 (42nd) | Downtown Julie Brown | Harry Dorrington, director | MTV |
1991 (43rd)
| 1991 (43rd) | ABC World of Discovery | Steve Martino and Jeff Doud, designers/directors; Jon Townley, creative director; Thomas Barham, designer | ABC |
| 1991 (43rd) | American Dreamer | Ed Sullivan, graphics/titles; Ron Crabb and Jeff Boortz, designers | NBC |
| 1991 (43rd) | Shannon's Deal | Ed Sullivan, design director; Jeff Boortz, designer; Scott Milne, harry artist | CBS |
| 1991 (43rd) | Sunday Best | Billy Pittard, design director; Jeff Boortz, designer/harry artist | CBS |
1992 (44th)
| 1992 (44th) | Liquid Television | Ken Pearce, designer/animator; Mark Malmberg, Creative Director/designer | MTV |
| 1992 (44th) | Brooklyn Bridge | Ed Sullivan, designer/art director/creative director; Suzanne Kiley, designer/producer/illustrator | CBS |
| 1992 (44th) | In Living Color | Martin Ansolabehere, title designer | Fox |
| 1992 (44th) | The Very Best of the Ed Sullivan Show 2 | James House, title designer | CBS |
1993 (45th)
| 1993 (45th) | Dudley | Billy Pittard, senior title designer; Frances Schifrin, principal title designer; Jennifer Grey Berkowitz, title designer/animator; Dale Everett, title designer/producer | CBS |
| 1993 (45th) | Homicide: Life on the Street | Mark Pellington, title designer | NBC |
| 1993 (45th) | MTV Video Music Awards | Michael D. Smith, designer; Dave Spafford, animator | MTV |
| 1993 (45th) | Rave | Ed Sullivan, senior title designer; Jeff Boortz, principal title designer | A&E |
| 1993 (45th) | Sisters | Billy Pittard, senior title designer; Judy Korin, principal title designer | NBC |
1994 (46th)
| 1994 (46th) | The X-Files | James Castle, Bruce Bryant and Carol Johnsen, title designers | Fox |
| 1994 (46th) | Birdland | Billy Pittard, senior title designer; Suzanne Kiley, principal title designer | ABC |
| 1994 (46th) | Late Show with David Letterman | Hal Gurnee, creative designer; D. Wallace Colvard, computer designer; Roger White, graphic designer | CBS |
| 1994 (46th) | Rolling Stone '93: The Year in Review | Joel Gallen, producer; Pam Thomas, director | Fox |
| 1994 (46th) | South of Sunset | Ed Sullivan, senior title designer; Jeff Boortz, principal title designer | CBS |
| 1994 (46th) | TekWar | Stephen Roloff, title sequence designer; Bret Culp, animator | Syndicated |
1995 (47th)
| 1995 (47th) | ER | Billy Pittard, senior title designer; Suzanne Kiley, principal title designer | NBC |
| 1995 (47th) | Cinemax Movie Open | Orest Woronewych, director of design; Adam Chin, animator; Tom Gericke, designer; Cliff Iwai, co-designer | Cinemax |
| 1995 (47th) | Future Quest | Michael Kory, Rick Simone and Jeff Wunderlich, title designers | PBS |
| 1995 (47th) | The Museum of Television & Radio Presents: Science Fiction, A Journey Into the Unknown | Judy Korin, Michael Kory and Jeff Wunderlich, title designers | Fox |
| 1995 (47th) | The Promised Land | Jacob Lawrence, animation; Alyson Hamilton and Guy Thomson, title designers; Anthony Geffen, title animation | Discovery |
| 1995 (47th) | Star Trek: Voyager | Dan Curry, title designer; John Grower, effects and animation supervisor; Erik Tiemens, storyboard/design; Eric Guaglione, animation supervisor | UPN |
1996 (48th)
| 1996 (48th) | Caroline in the City | Bruce Bryant, James Castle, Mark Dennison and Carol Johnsen, title designers | NBC |
| 1996 (48th) | Central Park West | Paul Newman and Billy Pittard, title designers | CBS |
| 1996 (48th) | Discovery Journal | Suzanne Kiley and Billy Pittard, title designers | Discovery |
1997 (49th)
| 1997 (49th) | Dark Skies | Mike Jones, title designer | NBC |
| 1997 (49th) | The Burning Zone | Kasumi Mihori and Billy Pittard, title designers | UPN |
| 1997 (49th) | Gun | Earl Jenshus and Billy Pittard, title designers; Jennifer Grey Berkowitz, creative director | ABC |
| 1997 (49th) | The Learning Channel's Great Books | Yvonne Gensurowsky and Billy Pittard, title designers | TLC |
| 1997 (49th) | The Magical World of Disney | Clark, Kasumi Mihori and Billy Pittard, title designers | Disney |
1998 (50th)
| 1998 (50th) | The Wonderful World of Disney | Kasumi Mihori, Billy Pittard and Ed Sullivan, title designers | ABC |
| 1998 (50th) | The Hunger | Nicholas Livesey, title designer | Showtime |
| 1998 (50th) | Politically Incorrect | Nancy Giandomenico, Nancy Laurence, Kelly Moseley and Mark Woods, graphics designers | ABC |
| 1998 (50th) | Popular Science | Mark Dwyer and Greg Pecknold, title designer | TLC |
| 1998 (50th) | Union Square | Bruce Bryant, Mark Dennison and Carol Johnsen, title designers | NBC |
1999 (51st)
| 1999 (51st) | Dilbert | Yarrow Cheney and Carrie Cheney, title designers | UPN |
| 1999 (51st) | Alice in Wonderland | Chris Allies, title designer | NBC |
| 1999 (51st) | First Wave | Halbo van der Klaauw, title designer | Sci-Fi |
| 1999 (51st) | Private Screenings | Shannon Davis Forsyth and Jin Lim, title designers | TCM |

=== 2000s ===
| Year | Program | Designers | Network |
|---|---|---|---|
2000 (52nd)
| 2000 (52nd) | The 10th Kingdom | Tim Webber, title designer | NBC |
| 2000 (52nd) | Nature | Billy Pittard and Ed Sullivan, creative directors; Juan Rosenfeldt, title designer | PBS |
| 2000 (52nd) | Now and Again | Earl Bateman, designer; Lee Dyer, co-designer; Alexander Lebedev, animator | CBS |
| 2000 (52nd) | The West Wing | Billy Pittard, creative director; Mark Johnston, title designer | NBC |
2001 (53rd)
| 2001 (53rd) | Exxon Mobil Masterpiece Theatre's American Collection | Karin Fong, Grant Lau, Peggy Oei, Dana Yee, title designers | PBS |
| 2001 (53rd) | AudioFile | Michael Goedecke and C. Ryan Riccio, title designers | Tech |
| 2001 (53rd) | MADtv | Adam Byrd and Stephen Kirklys, title designers | Fox |
| 2001 (53rd) | Norm | Clark and Wilfred Wong, title designers; Quico Encinias and Ricardo Silva, graphic artists | ABC |
| 2001 (53rd) | The Wonderful World of Disney | Michael Goetz, Kevin Goetz and Michael Goode, title designers | ABC |
2002 (54th)
| 2002 (54th) | Six Feet Under | Eric Anderson, Scott Hudziak, Paul Matthaeus and Danny Yount, title designers | HBO |
| 2002 (54th) | Band of Brothers | Michelle Dougherty, Jeff Miller, Michael Riley and Jason Web, title designers | HBO |
| 2002 (54th) | The Mind of the Married Man | Eric Anderson, Paul Matthaeus, Mason Nicoll and James Webber, title designers | HBO |
| 2002 (54th) | Wolf Lake | Thomas Cobb, Blake Danforth, George Montgomery and John Narun, title designers | CBS |
2003 (55th)
| 2003 (55th) | Hysterical Blindness | Laurent Fauchere, Chris Haak, Antoine Tinguely and Jakob Trollback, title designers | HBO |
| 2003 (55th) | The Anna Nicole Show | Dave Foss, Elizabeth Schricker and Jill Taffet, title designers | E! |
| 2003 (55th) | Napoléon | Sylvie Talbot, title designer | A&E |
| 2003 (55th) | Normal | Laurent Fauchere, Jasmine Jodry, Antoine Tinguely and Jakob Trollback, title designers | HBO |
| 2003 (55th) | Penn & Teller: Bullshit! | Kyle Hollingsworth and Justin Leibow, title designers | Showtime |
2004 (56th)
| 2004 (56th) | Carnivàle | Patrick Murphy, Vonetta Taylor and Angus Wall, title designers | HBO |
| 2004 (56th) | Angels in America | Randall Balsmeyer, J. John Corbett, Jim Rider and Amit Sethi, title designers | HBO |
| 2004 (56th) | Nicole Kidman: An American Cinematheque Tribute | Greg Hahn and Jakob Trollback, title designers | AMC |
| 2004 (56th) | Nip/Tuck | Eric Anderson, Vince Haycock, Paul Matthaeus and Paul Schneider, title designers | FX |
| 2004 (56th) | Stephen King's Kingdom Hospital | Josh Bodnar, Colin Day, Paul Matthaeus and Dade Ogeron, title designers | ABC |
2005 (57th)
| 2005 (57th) | Huff | Tracy Chandler, Jose Gomez, Christopher Markos and André Stringer, title designers | Showtime |
| 2005 (57th) | Desperate Housewives | Yolanda Santosa and Garson Yu, title designers | ABC |
| 2005 (57th) | The Grid | Dan Brown, Shawn Fedorchuk, Paul Matthaeus and Danny Yount, title designers | TNT |
| 2005 (57th) | House | Dan Brown, Dave Molloy, Matt Mulder and Jake Sargeant, title designers | Fox |
| 2005 (57th) | The Life and Death of Peter Sellers | Paul Donnellon, David Z. Obadiah, John Sunter and Andrew White, title designers | HBO |
2006 (58th)
| 2006 (58th) | The 78th Annual Academy Awards | Renato Grgic and Kristijan Petrovic, creative directors; Alen Petkovic, producer/creative designer; Jon Teschner, art director | ABC |
| 2006 (58th) | Big Love | Kirk Baxter, editor; Larry Ewing, creative director/producer; Maurice Marable, director; Angus Wall, creative designer/consultant | HBO |
| 2006 (58th) | Ghost Whisperer | Paul Matthaeus, creative director; Erin Sarofsky, designer; Anthony Vitagliano and Shangyu Yin, animators | CBS |
| 2006 (58th) | Rome | Kirk Balden, compositor; Andrew Hall, graphic supervisor; Angus Wall, director; Brad Waskewich, editor | HBO |
| 2006 (58th) | The Triangle | Robert Cribbett, compositor/designer; Nate Homan, animator/designer; Yolanda Santosa, art director/designer; Garson Yu, creative director/designer | Sci-Fi |
| 2006 (58th) | Weeds | Robert Bradley and Thomas Cobb, title designers | Showtime |
2007 (59th)
| 2007 (59th) | Dexter | Eric Anderson, creative director; Josh Bodnar, editor; Lindsay Daniels, designer; Colin Davis, main title producer | Showtime |
| 2007 (59th) | Hu$tle | Joe Berger, main title producer/animator; Pascal Wyse, designer | AMC |
| 2007 (59th) | The Lost Room | Thomas Cobb and Robert Bradley, title designers; Patrick Loungway, director of photography | Sci-Fi |
| 2007 (59th) | The Path to 9/11 | Matthew Mulder, creative director; Dave Molloy, editor; Colin Day and Lindsay Daniels, designers | ABC |
| 2007 (59th) | Standoff | Michael Riley, Bob Swensen, Dan Meehan and Brad Simmons, title designers | Fox |
| 2007 (59th) | Ugly Betty | Garson Yu, creative director; Yolanda Santosa, art director | ABC |
2008 (60th)
| 2008 (60th) | Mad Men | Mark Gardner and Steve Fuller, designers/directors; Cara McKenney, main title producer | AMC |
| 2008 (60th) | Bernard and Doris | Garson Yu and Synderela Peng, designers/art directors; Etsuko Uji, designer/animator; Edwin Baker, designer | HBO |
| 2008 (60th) | Chuck | Karin Fong, Jonathan Gershon and Dana Yee, title designers | NBC |
| 2008 (60th) | The Company | Matthew Mulder, creative director; Ryan Gagnier, designer/animator; Igor Choromanski and Cody Cobb, 3D animator/designer; Noah Conopask, designer | TNT |
| 2008 (60th) | New Amsterdam | Johanna Marciano, creative director/designer; Wendy Brovetto, main title producer; Bryan Keeling, animator | Fox |
2009 (61st)
| 2009 (61st) | United States of Tara | Jamie Caliri, director/director of photography/editor/main digital compositor; Dave Finkel, creator; Brett Baer, creator; Alex Jukasz, illustrator | Showtime |
| 2009 (61st) | Lie to Me | Robert Bradley and Thomas Cobb, title designers | Fox |
| 2009 (61st) | The Story Makers | James Spindler, creative director; Mike Wasilewski, designer; Ahmet Ahmet and Grant Lau, art directors | AMC |
| 2009 (61st) | Taking Chance | Michael Riley and Dru Nget, title designers; Dan Meehan, aimator; Bob Swensen, main title producer | HBO |
| 2009 (61st) | True Blood | Shawn Fedorchuk, editor; Matthew Mulder, creative director; Morgan Henry, main title producer; Rama Allen, Camm Rowland and Ryan Gagnier, designers | HBO |

=== 2010s ===
| Year | Program | Designers | Network |
|---|---|---|---|
2010 (62nd)
| 2010 (62nd) | Bored to Death | Tom Barham, Marci Ichimura, Dean Haspiel, and Anthony Santoro, title designers | HBO |
| 2010 (62nd) | Human Target | Karin Fong, Jeremy Cox, and Cara McKenney, title designers | Fox |
| 2010 (62nd) | Nurse Jackie | Stephen Fuller, Mark Gardner, Corey Weisz, and Cara McKenney, title designers | Showtime |
| 2010 (62nd) | The Pacific | Steve Fuller, Ahmet Ahmet, Peter Frankfurt, and Lauren Hartstone, title designers | HBO |
| 2010 (62nd) | Temple Grandin | Michael Riley, Zee Nederlander, Dru Nget, and Bob Swensen, title designers | HBO |
2011 (63rd)
| 2011 (63rd) | Game of Thrones | Angus Wall, creative director; Robert Feng, art director; Kirk H. Shintani, animator; Hameed Shaukat, designer | HBO |
| 2011 (63rd) | Any Human Heart | Paul McDonnell, designer; Hugo Moss, art director; Justin Lowings, animator | PBS |
| 2011 (63rd) | Boardwalk Empire | Karin Fong, Michelle Dougherty, designer/directors; Lauren Hartstone, designer/art director; Cara McKenney, producer/art director | HBO |
| 2011 (63rd) | Rubicon | Karin Fong, creative director; Jeremy Cox, designer/animator; Theodore Daley, designer; Cara McKenney, producer/art director | AMC |
| 2011 (63rd) | Too Big to Fail | Michael Riley, creative director; Bob Swensen, creative lead; Adam Bluming, editor; Cory Shaw, designer/animator | HBO |
2012 (64th)
| 2012 (64th) | Great Expectations | Nic Benns, title designer; Rodi Kaya, 3D artist; Tom Bromwich, titles producer | PBS |
| 2012 (64th) | American Horror Story | Kyle Cooper, title designer; Juan Ruiz Anchía, director of photography; Gabriel Diaz, editor; Ryan Murphy, designer | FX |
| 2012 (64th) | Magic City | Ahmet Ahmet, designer/creative director; Michelle Dougherty, designer/creative designer; Kathy Kelehan, producer/creative lead; Danielle White, editor | Starz |
| 2012 (64th) | New Girl | Conn Reilly, producer; Veva Burns, art director; John Priday, creative director | Fox |
| 2012 (64th) | Strike Back | Nic Benns, creative director/designer/animator; Miki Kato, art director; Joe Lea, compositor/editor | Cinemax |
2013 (65th)
| 2013 (65th) | Da Vinci's Demons | Paul McDonnell, creative director; Hugo Moss, art director; Nathan Mckenna, illustrator; Tamsin McGee, designer | Starz |
| 2013 (65th) | American Horror Story: Asylum | Kyle Cooper, title designer; Ryan Murphy, designer; Juan Ruiz Anchía, director of photography; Kate Berry, title producer | FX |
| 2013 (65th) | Elementary | Simon Clowes, title designer; Benji Bakshi, director of photography; Kyle Cooper, creative director; Nate Park, editor | CBS |
| 2013 (65th) | Halo 4: Forward Unto Dawn | Heiko Schneck, CG lead; Fabian Poss, producer/animator; Csaba Letay, compositor; Jan Bitzer, CG lead/editor | Machinima.com |
| 2013 (65th) | The Newsroom | Michael Riley and Denny Zimmerman, title designers; Cory Shaw, animator; Justine Gerenstein, editor | HBO |
| 2013 (65th) | Vikings | Rama Allen, director; Audrey Davis, art director; Ryan McKenna, editor; Westley Sarokin, 2D lead artist/VFX supervisor | History |
2014 (66th)
| 2014 (66th) | True Detective | Patrick Clair, creative director; Raoul Marks, animator; Jennifer Sofio Hall, creative producer | HBO |
| 2014 (66th) | Black Sails | Karin Fong, director; Michelle Dougherty, designer/director; Alan Williams, designer/art director; Kris Kuksi, fine art sculptor; Brian Butcher, producer | Starz |
| 2014 (66th) | Cosmos: A Spacetime Odyssey | Curtis Doss and Shaun Collings, creative directors; Randall Smith, visual effects supervisor; Tom Connors, CG supervisor; Troy James Miller, Producer | Fox |
| 2014 (66th) | Masters of Sex | Leanne Dare, art director; Yi-Jen Liu, designer; Jon Forsman, animator; Gabriel Britz, editor | Showtime |
| 2014 (66th) | Silicon Valley | Garson Yu, creative director; Mehmet Kizilay, designer/lead animator | HBO |
2015 (67th)
| 2015 (67th) | Manhattan | Dan Gregoras, creative director; Jeremy Cox, art director; Jon Hassell, creative producer; Griffin Frazen, designer | WGN America |
| 2015 (67th) | American Horror Story: Freak Show | Ryan Murphy and Kyle Cooper, creative directors; Lee Nelson, art director/3D supervisor; Nadia Tzuo, art director/2D supervisor | FX |
| 2015 (67th) | Bosch | Grant Lau, creative director; JJ Gerber, creative producer; Michael Radtke, editor; Rod Basham, flame artist | Amazon |
| 2015 (67th) | Halt and Catch Fire | Patrick Clair, creative director; Raoul Marks, animator; Eddy Herringson, designer; Paul Kim, typographer | AMC |
| 2015 (67th) | Marvel's Daredevil | Patrick Clair, creative director; Andrew Romatz, CGI lead; Miguel Salek, fluids lead; Shahana Kahn, lead compositor | Netflix |
| 2015 (67th) | Olive Kitteridge | Garson Yu, creative director; Synderela Peng, art director; Michael Lane Parks, editor; Alex Pollini, director of photography | HBO |
2016 (68th)
| 2016 (68th) | The Man in the High Castle | Patrick Clair, creative director; Paul Kim, designer; Jose Limon, CG artist; Raoul Marks, animator | Amazon |
| 2016 (68th) | Marvel's Jessica Jones | Michelle Dougherty, creative director; Arisu Kashiwagi, lead designer; Rod Basham, flame artist; David Mack, illustrator; Eric Demeusy, animator; Thomas McMahan, animator | Netflix |
| 2016 (68th) | Narcos | Tom O'Neill, creative director; Nik Kleverov, editor; David Badounts, lead animator/compositor; Josh Smith, CG/design lead | Netflix |
| 2016 (68th) | The Night Manager | Patrick Clair, creative director; Jeff Han, designer; Paul Kim, designer; Raoul Marks, animator | AMC |
| 2016 (68th) | Vinyl | Alan Williams and Michelle Dougherty, creative directors; Tess Sitzmann, creative producer; Jon Hassell, executive producer; Jessica Ledoux, editor | HBO |
2017 (69th)
| 2017 (69th) | Stranger Things | Michelle Dougherty, creative director; Peter Frankfurt, executive creative director; Arisu Kashiwagi, designer; Eric Demeusy, compositor/designer | Netflix |
| 2017 (69th) | American Gods | Patrick Clair, creative director; Raoul Marks, lead compositor and animator; Devin Maurer, editor; Jeff Han, designer | Starz |
| 2017 (69th) | The Crown | Patrick Clair, creative director; Raoul Marks, lead compositor and animator; Javier Leon Carrillo, look developer; Jeff Han, designer | Netflix |
| 2017 (69th) | Feud: Bette and Joan | Ryan Murphy, creative director; Alexis Martin Woodall, creative producer; Kyle Cooper, director; Nadia Tzuo, designer; Margherita Premuroso, animator | FX |
| 2017 (69th) | Westworld | Patrick Clair, creative director; Raoul Marks, lead compositor and animator; Yongsub Song, compositor and animator; Felix Soletic, designer; Jessica Hurst, CG modeler; Jose Limon, CG modeler/sculptor | HBO |
2018 (70th)
| 2018 (70th) | Counterpart | Karin Fong, creative director; Jake Ferguson, lead designer; Felipe Carvalho, Nathan Lee, designer; Zach Kilroy, editor | Starz |
| 2018 (70th) | The Alienist | Angus Wall and Lisa Bolan, creative directors; Yongsub Song and Charles Khoury, animators/compositors; Heidi Berg, art director; Felix Soletic, designer | TNT |
| 2018 (70th) | Altered Carbon | Lisa Bolan, creative director; Thomas McMahan, Yongsub Song and Byron Slaybaugh, animators/compositors; Carlo Sa and Mert Kizilay, designers | Netflix |
| 2018 (70th) | GLOW | Jason Groves, Christopher Harding and Richard Kenworthy, creative directors/art directors/designers | Netflix |
| 2018 (70th) | Westworld | Patrick Clair, creative director; Raoul Marks, lead animator/lead compositor; Jose Limon, lead CG modeler; Savva Tsekmes, animator/compositor | HBO |
2019 (71st)
| 2019 (71st) | Game of Thrones | Angus Wall, creative director; Kirk Shintani, art director; Shahana Khan, lead compositor; Ian Ruhfass, 3D lead; Rustam Hasanov, lead conceptual designer | HBO |
| 2019 (71st) | Conversations with a Killer: The Ted Bundy Tapes | Lisa Bolan, creative director; Peter Murphy, animator; Alyssa Oh, editor; June Cho, designer | Netflix |
| 2019 (71st) | Star Trek: Discovery | Ana Criado, creative director; Nader Husseini and Zachary Kinney, animators; Francisco Sánchez de Cañete, art director; Christian Antolin, designer; Kyle Cooper, creative director | CBS All Access |
| 2019 (71st) | True Detective | Patrick Clair, Nic Pizzolatto, Kyle Moore and Victor Joy, creative directors; Raoul Marks, designer/creative director; Woosung Kang, designer/compositor/art director/animator | HBO |
| 2019 (71st) | Warrior | John Likens, creative director; Wesley Ebelhar, art director; Arisu Kashiwagi, designer/art director | Cinemax |

=== 2020s ===
| Year | Program | Designers | Network |
|---|---|---|---|
2020 (72nd)
| 2020 (72nd) | Godfather of Harlem | Mason Nicoll, creative director/editor; Peter Pak, designer/lead animator/art director; Giovana Pham, designer; Cisco Torres, animator | Epix |
| 2020 (72nd) | Abstract: The Art of Design | Allie Fisher, creative director; Anthony Zazzi, animator; Brian Oakes, director | Netflix |
| 2020 (72nd) | Carnival Row | Lisa Bolan, creative director; Henry DeLeon and Mert Kizilay, art directors; Kaya Thomas, designer; Yongsub Song, animator/compositor; Alex Silver, animator | Prime Video |
| 2020 (72nd) | The Morning Show | Angus Wall and Hazel Baird, creative directors; Emanuele Marani, lead designer; EJ Kang, lead animator; Peter Murphy and Erik Righetti, animators | Apple TV+ |
| 2020 (72nd) | The Politician | Heidi Berg and Felix Soletic, creative directors; Carlo Sa, lead designer; Yongsub Song, lead animator; Joe Paniagua, 3D artist; Rachel Fowler, editor | Netflix |
| 2020 (72nd) | Watchmen | Paul Mitchell, creative director; Olga Midlenko, art director; Maciek Sokalski, lead compositor; Gabe Perez, animator; Benjamin Woodlock, designer | HBO |
| 2020 (72nd) | Westworld | Patrick Clair and Pinar Yanadarg Delul, creative directors; Raoul Marks, lead animator and compositor; Lance Slaton, designer | HBO |
2021 (73rd)
| 2021 (73rd) | The Good Lord Bird | Efrain Montanez, director/creative director; Eduardo Guisandes, art director/designer; Abigail Fairfax, illustrator/animator | Showtime |
| 2021 (73rd) | Between the World and Me | Hazel Baird, creative director; Diego Coutinho, art director; Rafael Morinaga, animator | HBO |
| 2021 (73rd) | Lovecraft Country | Patrick Clair, creative director; Raoul Marks, art director/animator/compositor/lead 3D artist; Ken Taylor, illustrator | HBO |
| 2021 (73rd) | The Queen's Gambit | Saskia Marka, creative director/designer/editor; David Whyte, designer/animator | Netflix |
| 2021 (73rd) | Raised by Wolves | Steve Small, director | HBO Max |
| 2021 (73rd) | WandaVision | John LePore and Doug Appleton, creative directors; Nick Woythaler, lead designer/animator; Alex Rupert, designer/animator | Disney+ |
2022 (74th)
| 2022 (74th) | Severance | Oliver Latta, director/creative director/art director/editor/animator/3D artist; Teddy Blanks, typographer/typography animation | Apple TV+ |
| 2022 (74th) | Candy | Ronnie Koff and Peter Frankfurt, creative directors; Lexi Gunvaldson, editor; Rob Slychuk and Nader Husseini, animators; Elizabeth Steinberg, designer | Hulu |
| 2022 (74th) | Cowboy Bebop | Karin Fong, creative director; Kiyoon Nam, James Gardner and Merrill Hall, designers/animators; Kathy Liang, designer; Lexi Gunvaldson, editor | Netflix |
| 2022 (74th) | Foundation | Ronnie Koff, creative director; Zach Kilroy, editor; Danil Krivoruchko, animator/3D artist; James Gardner and Brandon Savoy, designers | Apple TV+ |
| 2022 (74th) | Lisey's Story | Karin Fong and Osbert Parker, directors; Henry Chang, lead designer/animator; Merrill Hall and Russ Gautier, animators; Lexi Gunvaldson, editor | Apple TV+ |
| 2022 (74th) | Only Murders in the Building | Lisa Bolan, creative director; Tnaya Witmer and Laura Perez, designers; James Hurlburt, Evan Larimore and Jahmad Rollins, animators | Hulu |
| 2022 (74th) | Pachinko | Angus Wall and Nadia Tzuo, creative directors; Florian Hoffmeister and Ante Cheng, cinematographers; Nathaniel Park, lead editor; Lucy Kim, lead animator | Apple TV+ |
2023 (75th)
| 2023 (75th) | The Last of Us | Andy Hall and Nadia Tzuo, creative directors; Gryun Kim and Jun Kim, 3D artists; Min Shi and Xiaolin (Mike) Zeng, designers | HBO |
| 2023 (75th) | Guillermo del Toro's Cabinet of Curiosities | Mike Schaeffer, creative director; Chet Hirsch, director; David Rowley, art director; Akshay Tiwari, designer | Netflix |
| 2023 (75th) | Hello Tomorrow! | Ronnie Koff, creative director; Lexi Gunvaldson, editor; Christoph Gabathuler, 3D artist; Juan Monasterio and Fernando Lazzari, animators; Lindsey Mayer-Beug, illustrator | Apple TV+ |
| 2023 (75th) | The Lord of the Rings: The Rings of Power | Katrina Crawford and Mark Bashore, directors; Anthony Vitagliano, creative director; Fernando Domínguez Cózar, animation director | Prime Video |
| 2023 (75th) | Wednesday | Aaron Becker, creative director; Joseph Ahn, designer; James Ramirez, Lee Nelson and Hsien Lun Su, animators; Eric Keller, 3D artist | Netflix |
| 2023 (75th) | The White Lotus | Katrina Crawford, director/creative director/photographer; Mark Bashore, director/editor; Lezio Lopes, illustrator; Cian McKenna, animator | HBO |
2024 (76th)
| 2024 (76th) | Shōgun | Nadia Tzuo, creative director; Xiaolin Zeng and Ilya Tselyutin, designers; Alex Silver, Lee Buckley and Evan Larimore, animators | FX |
| 2024 (76th) | Fallout | Patrick Clair, creative director; Lance Slaton, art director; Raoul Marks, animator; Scott Geersen, 3D artist | Prime Video |
| 2024 (76th) | Lessons in Chemistry | Hazel Baird and Rob Cawdery, creative directors; Ben Jones, designer; Phil Davies, 3D artist | Apple TV+ |
| 2024 (76th) | Palm Royale | Ronnie Koff, creative director/designer; Rob Slychuk and Nader Husseini, animators; Lexi Gunvaldson, editor | Apple TV+ |
| 2024 (76th) | Silo | Patrick Clair and Raoul Marks, creative directors; Lance Slaton, illustrator | Apple TV+ |
| 2024 (76th) | 3 Body Problem | Patrick Clair and Raoul Marks, creative directors; Eddy Herringson, designer | Netflix |
2025 (77th)
| 2025 (77th) | Severance | Oliver Latta, creative director/designer/animator/compositor; Teddy Blanks, typographer | Apple TV+ |
| 2025 (77th) | Dark Matter | Ronnie Koff, creative director/designer/animator; Charlie Proctor and Alex Braddock, animators; Lexi Gunvaldson, editor | Apple TV+ |
| 2025 (77th) | The Decameron | Mark Bashore and Katrina Crawford, directors; Jason Esser, designer/animator; Torin Bashore, illustrator/animator; Harry Teitelman, animator; Mauro Gimferrer Alos, 3D artist | Netflix |
| 2025 (77th) | House of the Dragon | Garson Yu, creative director; Mulan Leong-Suzuki, art director/designer; James Robertson, art director/designer/animator; Damian Stricker, 3D artist; Dan Tegnelia, editor; Gregory Jones, compositor | HBO |
| 2025 (77th) | The Penguin | Aaron Becker, creative director; Joseph Ahn and Michael Lo, designers; Hsien Lun Su, Alasdair Willson and Ben Hurand, animators | HBO |
| 2025 (77th) | The White Lotus | Katrina Crawford, director/art director; Mark Bashore, director/editor; Mauro Gimferrer and Marcos Coral, 3D artists | HBO |
2026 (78th)
| 2026 (78th) | Spider-Noir | Mason Nicoll, director; Andrew Julien, art director/editor; Arik Weiss, designer; Peter Pak, art director; John Van Unen, 3D artist; Daniel Duda and Christian Arnsparger, animators; Rachel Brickel, cinematographer | MGM+ / Prime Video |
| 2026 (78th) | It: Welcome to Derry | Aaron Becker, creative director; Seth Kleinberg, art director; Troy Miller, editor; Joseph Ahn, Michael Lo, Hsien Lun Su and Li-Yu Chen, designers; Lee Nelson, animator | HBO |
| 2026 (78th) | Murderbot | Hazel Baird and Rob Cawdery, creative directors; Phil Davies, designer/animator; Ben Jones, animator; Ethem Cem and Xiaolin Zeng, designers; Joe Paniagua, 3D artist; Lance Slaton, illustrator | Apple TV |
| 2026 (78th) | Ponies | Ronnie Koff, creative director; Kathy Liang, designer; Fernando Lazzari, Charles Khoury, Christoph Gabathuler and Jeffrey Su, animators/designers; Min Shi, 3D artist; Lexi Gunvaldson, editor | Peacock |
| 2026 (78th) | Smoke | Mason Nicoll, director; Peter Pak, art director; Rachel Brickel, art director/cinematographer; Ana Criado, designer; Simon Chan, animator; Justin West, editor | Apple TV |
| 2026 (78th) | Young Sherlock | Ronnie Koff, creative director; Elizabeth Steinberg, designer; Min Shi, 3D artist; Scott Bell, lead animator; Henry Chang, Christoph Gabathuler and Charlie Proctor, animators; Lexi Gunvaldson, editor | Prime Video |

== Programs with multiple awards ==
2 awards

- Game of Thrones
- Severance

== Programs with multiple nomination ==
3 nominations

- American Horror Story
- Westworld

2 nominations

- Game of Thrones
- Saturday Night Live
- Severance
- True Detective
- The Wonderful World of Disney
- The White Lotus
