= List of awards and nominations received by Weeds =

List of awards and nominations for Weeds
Awards and nominations
Award	Wins	Nominations
ADG Excellence in Production Design Awards	2	3
ALMA Awards	0	1
Artios Awards	0	2
BMI Film and TV Awards	1	1
Directors Guild of America Awards	0	1
Golden Globe Awards	1	10
Guild of Music Supervisors Awards	0	1
NAACP Image Awards	0	3
People's Choice Awards	0	2
Primetime Emmy Awards	2	20
Producers Guild of America Awards	0	3
Satellite Awards	2	11
Saturn Awards	0	1
Screen Actors Guild Awards	0	6
Writers Guild of America Awards	1	3
Young Artist Awards	2	6

Totals (Note: Certain award groups do not simply award one winner. They acknowledge several different recipients, have runners-up, and have third place. Since this is a specific recognition and is different from losing an award, runner-up mentions are considered wins in this award tally. For simplification and to avoid errors, each award in this list has been presumed to have had a prior nomination.)
- Wins: 11
- Nominations: 74

This is the list of awards and nominations received by the American dark comedy drama television series Weeds.

== Awards and nominations ==
Awards and nominations received by Weeds
Award	Year (Note: The listed year refers to the date of the ceremony, not necessarily the year in which the corresponding season or episode aired.)	Category	Nominee(s)	Result	Ref.
ADG Excellence in Production Design Awards	2009	Excellence in Production Design for Half Hour Single-Camera Series	Joseph P. Lucky, William J. Durrell Jr., Julie Bolder (for "Excellent Treasures")	Won	
ADG Excellence in Production Design Awards	2010	Excellence in Production Design for Half Hour Single-Camera Series	Joseph P. Lucky, William J. Durrell Jr., Viva Wang, Julie Bolder (for "Ducks and Tigers")	Won	
ADG Excellence in Production Design Awards	2012	Excellence in Production Design for Half Hour Single-Camera Series	Joseph P. Lucky, William J. Durrell Jr., Sharon Busse, Meagen Brooks, Julie Bolder (for "Game-Played")	Nominated	
ALMA Awards	2009	Year in TV Comedy – Actor	Demián Bichir	Nominated	
Artios Awards	2008	Outstanding Achievement in Casting – Television Series – Comedy	Dava Waite	Nominated	
Artios Awards	2009	Outstanding Achievement in Casting – Television Series – Comedy	Dava Waite	Nominated	
BMI Film and TV Awards	2007	BMI Cable Award	Gwendolyn Sanford	Won	
Directors Guild of America Awards	2009	Outstanding Directorial Achievement in Comedy Series	Paris Barclay (Note: Additional nominees: Leslie Waldman (unit production manager), Eric Jewett (first assistant director), Amy Hughes (second assistant director), Stephen Dudycha (second second assistant director)) (for "The Three Coolers")	Nominated	
Golden Globe Awards	2006	Best Television Series – Musical or Comedy	Weeds	Nominated	
Golden Globe Awards	2006	Best Performance by an Actress in a Television Series – Musical or Comedy	Mary-Louise Parker	Won	
Golden Globe Awards	2006	Best Performance by an Actress in a Supporting Role in a Series, Miniseries or Motion Picture Made for Television	Elizabeth Perkins	Nominated	
Golden Globe Awards	2007	Best Television Series – Musical or Comedy	Weeds	Nominated	
Golden Globe Awards	2007	Best Performance by an Actress in a Television Series – Musical or Comedy	Mary-Louise Parker	Nominated	
Golden Globe Awards	2007	Best Performance by an Actress in a Supporting Role in a Series, Miniseries or Motion Picture Made for Television	Elizabeth Perkins	Nominated	
Golden Globe Awards	2007	Best Performance by an Actor in a Supporting Role in a Series, Miniseries or Motion Picture Made for Television	Justin Kirk	Nominated	
Golden Globe Awards	2008	Best Performance by an Actress in a Television Series – Musical or Comedy	Mary-Louise Parker	Nominated	
Golden Globe Awards	2009	Best Television Series – Musical or Comedy	Weeds	Nominated	
Golden Globe Awards	2009	Best Performance by an Actress in a Television Series – Musical or Comedy	Mary-Louise Parker	Nominated	
Guild of Music Supervisors Awards	2013	Best Music Supervision for Television Musical or Comedy	Bruce Gilbert	Nominated	
NAACP Image Awards	2007	Outstanding Supporting Actor in a Comedy Series	Romany Malco	Nominated	
NAACP Image Awards	2008	Outstanding Supporting Actor in a Comedy Series	Romany Malco	Nominated	
NAACP Image Awards	2008	Outstanding Supporting Actress in a Comedy Series	Tonye Patano	Nominated	
People's Choice Awards	2009	Favorite TV Drama Diva	Mary-Louise Parker	Nominated	
People's Choice Awards	2012	Favorite Cable TV Comedy	Weeds	Nominated	
Primetime Emmy Awards	2006	Outstanding Supporting Actress in a Comedy Series	Elizabeth Perkins (for "You Can't Miss the Bear" and "The Punishment Light")	Nominated	
Primetime Emmy Awards	2006	Outstanding Directing for a Comedy Series	Craig Zisk (for "Good Shit Lollipop")	Nominated	
Primetime Emmy Awards	2007	Outstanding Lead Actress in a Comedy Series	Mary-Louise Parker (for "Mrs. Botwin's Neighborhood")	Nominated	
Primetime Emmy Awards	2007	Outstanding Supporting Actress in a Comedy Series	Elizabeth Perkins (for "Pittsburgh")	Nominated	
Primetime Emmy Awards	2008	Outstanding Lead Actress in a Comedy Series	Mary-Louise Parker (for "Bill Sussman")	Nominated	
Primetime Emmy Awards	2009	Outstanding Comedy Series	Weeds (Note: Nominees: Roberto Benabib, Mark A. Burley, Rolin Jones, Jenji Kohan, Matthew Salsberg, Craig Zisk)	Nominated	
Primetime Emmy Awards	2009	Outstanding Lead Actress in a Comedy Series	Mary-Louise Parker (for "Lady's a Charm")	Nominated	
Primetime Emmy Awards	2009	Outstanding Supporting Actress in a Comedy Series	Elizabeth Perkins (for "No Man is Pudding")	Nominated	
Primetime Creative Arts Emmy Awards	2006	Outstanding Casting for a Comedy Series	Amy McIntyre Britt, Anya Colloff	Nominated	
Primetime Creative Arts Emmy Awards	2006	Outstanding Main Title Design	Robert Bradley, Thomas Cobb	Nominated	
Primetime Creative Arts Emmy Awards	2006	Outstanding Single-Camera Picture Editing for a Comedy Series	David Helfand (for "Good Shit Lollipop")	Nominated	
Primetime Creative Arts Emmy Awards	2007	Outstanding Casting for a Comedy Series	Amy McIntyre Britt, Anya Colloff	Nominated	
Primetime Creative Arts Emmy Awards	2007	Outstanding Single-Camera Picture Editing for a Comedy Series	David Helfand (for "Mrs. Botwin's Neighborhood")	Nominated	
Primetime Creative Arts Emmy Awards	2007	Outstanding Single-Camera Picture Editing for a Comedy Series	William Turro (for "Crush Girl Love Panic")	Nominated	
Primetime Creative Arts Emmy Awards	2008	Outstanding Picture Editing for a Comedy Series (Single or Multi-Camera)	William Turro (for "A Pool and His Money")	Nominated	
Primetime Creative Arts Emmy Awards	2008	Outstanding Sound Mixing for a Comedy or Drama Series (Half-Hour) and Animation	Susan Moore-Chong, Chris Philp, Fred Tator (for "Go")	Nominated	
Primetime Creative Arts Emmy Awards	2009	Outstanding Casting for a Comedy Series	Dava Waite	Nominated	
Primetime Creative Arts Emmy Awards	2009	Outstanding Cinematography for a Half-Hour Series	Michael Trim (for "No Man is Pudding")	Nominated	
Primetime Creative Arts Emmy Awards	2009	Outstanding Sound Mixing for a Comedy or Drama Series (Half-Hour) and Animation	Jon Ailetcher, Chris Philp, Fred Tator (for "The Three Coolers")	Won	
Primetime Creative Arts Emmy Awards	2010	Outstanding Cinematography for a Half-Hour Series	Michael Trim (for "A Modest Proposal")	Won	
Producers Guild of America Awards	2007	Outstanding Producer of Episodic Television, Comedy	Roberto Benabib, Mark A. Burley, Jenji Kohan	Nominated	
Producers Guild of America Awards	2009	Outstanding Producer of Episodic Television, Comedy	Roberto Benabib, Mark A. Burley, Jenji Kohan, Craig Zisk	Nominated	
Producers Guild of America Awards	2010	Outstanding Producer of Episodic Television, Comedy	Roberto Benabib, Mark A. Burley, Jenji Kohan, Craig Zisk	Nominated	
Satellite Awards	2005	Best Actress in a Series, Musical or Comedy	Mary-Louise Parker	Won (Note: Tied with Felicity Huffman for Desperate Housewives)	
Satellite Awards	2005	Best Actress in a Series, Musical or Comedy	Elizabeth Perkins	Nominated	
Satellite Awards	2006	Best Actress in a Series, Musical or Comedy	Mary-Louise Parker	Nominated	
Satellite Awards	2006	Best Actress in a Supporting Role in a Series, Mini-Series or Motion Picture Made for Television	Elizabeth Perkins	Nominated	
Satellite Awards	2007	Best Television Series, Musical or Comedy	Weeds	Nominated	
Satellite Awards	2007	Best Actor in a Supporting Role in a Series, Mini-Series or Motion Picture Made for Television	Justin Kirk	Nominated	
Satellite Awards	2008	Best Actress in a Series, Musical or Comedy	Mary-Louise Parker	Nominated	
Satellite Awards	2008	Best Actor in a Series, Musical or Comedy	Justin Kirk	Won	
Satellite Awards	2009	Best Television Series, Musical or Comedy	Weeds	Nominated	
Satellite Awards	2009	Best Actress in a Series, Musical or Comedy	Mary-Louise Parker	Nominated	
Satellite Awards	2010	Best Actress in a Series, Musical or Comedy	Mary-Louise Parker	Nominated	
Saturn Awards	2011	Best Guest Starring Role on Television	Richard Dreyfuss	Nominated	
Screen Actors Guild Awards	2006	Outstanding Performance by a Female Actor in a Comedy Series	Mary-Louise Parker	Nominated	
Screen Actors Guild Awards	2007	Outstanding Performance by a Female Actor in a Comedy Series	Mary-Louise Parker	Nominated	
Screen Actors Guild Awards	2007	Outstanding Performance by an Ensemble in a Comedy Series	Martin Donovan, Alexander Gould, Allie Grant, Indigo, Justin Kirk, Romany Malco, Andy Milder, Kevin Nealon, Maulik Pancholy, Mary-Louise Parker, Hunter Parrish, Tonye Patano, Elizabeth Perkins, Eden Sher	Nominated	
Screen Actors Guild Awards	2008	Outstanding Performance by a Female Actor in a Comedy Series	Mary-Louise Parker	Nominated	
Screen Actors Guild Awards	2009	Outstanding Performance by a Female Actor in a Comedy Series	Mary-Louise Parker	Nominated	
Screen Actors Guild Awards	2009	Outstanding Performance by an Ensemble in a Comedy Series	Demián Bichir, Julie Bowen, Enrique Castillo, Guillermo Diaz, Alexander Gould, Allie Grant, Justin Kirk, Hemky Madera, Andy Milder, Kevin Nealon, Mary-Louise Parker, Hunter Parrish, Elizabeth Perkins, Jack Stehlin	Nominated	
Writers Guild of America Awards	2006	Television: Episodic Comedy	Jenji Kohan (for "You Can't Miss the Bear")	Won	
Writers Guild of America Awards	2009	Television: Comedy Series	Roberto Benabib, Mark A. Burley, Ron Fitzgerald, Dave Holstein, Rolin Jones, Brendan Kelly, Jenji Kohan, Victoria Morrow, Matthew Salsberg	Nominated	
Writers Guild of America Awards	2012	Television: Episodic Comedy	Stephen Falk (for "Object Impermanence")	Nominated	
Young Artist Awards	2007	Best Performance in a TV Series (Comedy or Drama) – Supporting Young Actor	Alexander Gould	Won	
Young Artist Awards	2007	Best Performance in a TV Series (Comedy or Drama) – Supporting Young Actress	Allie Grant	Nominated	
Young Artist Awards	2007	Best Performance in a TV Series – Recurring Young Actor	Kasey Campbell	Nominated	
Young Artist Awards	2008	Best Performance in a TV Series (Comedy or Drama) – Supporting Young Actor	Alexander Gould	Nominated	
Young Artist Awards	2009	Best Performance in a TV Series – Recurring Young Actor	Joey Luthman	Nominated	
Young Artist Awards	2013	Best Performance in a TV Series – Guest Starring Young Actor 11–13	Mateus Ward	Won	
