= Patrick Clair =

Australian film director

Patrick Clair (born c.1983) is an Australian film director and title sequence designer. He has won the Primetime Emmy Award for Outstanding Main Title Sequence in 2014 and 2016. He has been nominated in the category twelve times. He is the founder of production and design studio Antibody.

== Education ==
Clair studied screen direction at Queensland University of Technology, graduating in 2002. Following this he completed a Master of Arts: Film, Television and Digital Media at the Australian Film, Television and Radio School.

== Early career ==
He directed a series of documentaries for the Australian Broadcasting Corporation, many focusing on the intersection of technology and conflict. This included films on robot warfare, DDOS cyberattacks, Wikileak’s Collateral Murder Video and digital privacy. His 2011 film, Stuxnet: Anatomy of a Virus, achieved viral notoriety and was subsequently exhibited by the New York Museum of Modern Art (MoMA) as part of their Design and Violence series. It has since become a key example of motion infographics from the era.

In 2012 Clair collaborated with Brookings Institution on a film, Big Bets and Black Swans, for the White House outlining the risks facing President Obama’s foreign policy in his second term.

== Title sequences ==
In 2014 Clair worked with frequent collaborator Raoul Marks to create the title sequence for HBO series, True Detective. The sequence went on to win the 2014 Primetime Emmy for Outstanding Main Title. Clair described the sequence as creating “broken portraits out of broken landscapes". The sequence is notable for its use of double exposure motifs, Clair has said "Visually, we were inspired by photographic double exposures. Fragmented portraits, created by using human figures as windows into partial landscapes, served as a great way to show characters that are marginalized or internally divided. It made sense for the titles to feature portraits of the lead characters built out the place they lived." Industry sources have said of Clair that "his striking True Detective main titles, which featured silhouettes of the main characters filled with watery images from the series, cemented Clair as a key designer of main titles, an art form all its own in the era of premium TV."

This was the first in a long line of title sequences created by the pair. Their work often contrasts two opposing symbols, such as for American Gods (Religious symbolism and neon lighting) or The Man in the High Castle (American and Nazi iconography). Maria Lewis, a curator at ACMI proffered “the pair are pioneers in the artform and their work has been foundational to the genre of title sequences for prestige television” and “has helped redefine and resurrect title credits as we know them.”

Clair's sequences for Westworld have been nominated for the Outstanding Main Title Emmy Award in 2017, 2018 and 2020. Showrunner Lisa Joy praised the collaboration as creating a "piece of moving art." Austin Shaw, Professor of Motion Design at Savannah College of Art and Design cited Westworld as a peak example of motion design that employed strong emotional engagement, "these images portray the classical motif of the mother and child. This theme is universal to human experience and can evoke powerful feelings of love and vulnerability. However, juxtaposed within the context of artificial intelligence and 3D printing, these images convey additional feelings of threat, fear, and uncertainty."

Series their work has appeared on include:

- True Detective, HBO, 2014-
- The Crown, Netflix, 2015-
- Westworld, HBO, 2016-2022
- Halt and Catch Fire, AMC, 2014-2017
- American Gods, Start, 2017-2021
- The Night Manager, BBC, 2016
- Lovecraft Country, HBO, 2021
- Silo, AppleTV+, 2023-
- Interview with the Vampire, AMC, 2022-

== Directing ==
In 2015 Clair collaborated with games publisher Activision on a short speculative film charting the evolution of body implants across the 21st century, from sport to potential uses in military augmentation. The teaser film, Embers, was used to promote Call of Duty: Black Ops III. The video deals with "military and biotechnological subject including dystopian transhumanist elements." The film opens with a quote from Albert Einstein “our technology has exceeded our humanity.” Alternate versions of the film open with the text “Mankind’s greatest mistake will be its inability to control the technology it has created.” No citation is included on the alternate version of the film.

Clair has worked with French video game publisher Ubisoft on a series of projects exploring technology and conflict, often blending real world facts with video game folklore. “Who Turned the lights off?” (2012) invoked a 2003 black-out in the United States to explore the vulnerability of physical infrastructure and was used to announce the hacker-themed game Watch Dogs. Vice described the trailer as "tapping into the zeitgeist anxiety of our digital age—the notion of privacy and how our online habits and movements are being monitored—Clair’s bold graphics are the perfect fit to introduce the paranoid narrative of the game." Clair wrote and directed materials for the 2013 launch of Tom Clancy’s The Division that drew on the real life Dark Winter simulation. In 2018 he worked with Ubisoft again on a trailer revisiting themes of Artificial Intelligence and Autonomous Weapons for Ghost Recon Breakpoint. Upon its release, Clair said he's "been fascinated by the relationship between war and technology... what’s interesting/terrifying is how easily reality blends into fiction and vice-versa... we’re always looking to tell stories that interrogate ethics, human fallibility, and technology."

His style is notable for combining elements of live-action with animation, design and motion graphics.

His work often contains themes of technology and conflict. Unusually, in addition to these projects with military and technology themes, Clair has also worked with luxury fashion house Louis Vuitton and Swiss watchmaker Audemars Piguet.

== Views on artificial intelligence ==
Clair has been a vocal proponent of harnessing the power of AI to enhance creativity, while also cautioning that the technology is poised to disrupt the creative industries. He was quoted on The Verge as saying “they [generative AI models] are going to reshape industries and jobs will be lost” while also expressing that fear must not shape the conversation around AI. “The problem with conversations driven by fear is that they often lack nuance, and when arguments lack nuance, they lack compassion and empathy.”

Clair has expressed surprise at the creative potential of AI generative art, saying “DALL-E surprises you, and comes back with things that are genuinely creative” and that the art can have “touching little moments of character.”

Clair's title sequence work has also dealt with themes of AI and ethics, with one writer observing of his Westworld sequence: "The theme of AI developing its own consciousness and turning on its creators is beautifully encapsulated in a little less than two minutes."
