= Vic Pratt =

British comic writer

Victor Alfred Cornelius Eustace Beltane Diggory Penrith Pratt, more commonly known as Vic Pratt, is an artist, writer, musician and actor born in 1971. He lives in Muswell Hill, North East London.

Pratt printed two issues of his own British small press comics Flea Circus in the mid-1990s. His comic strips are mostly autobiographical similar to Robert Crumb or Chester Brown. His art influences are David Law and Hergé. He drew a comic strip "Bad Feedback" in which he remembers his time in university having his comics rejected.

He wrote reviews in the 1990s small press zine Zum! He also wrote for Story Paper Collectors' Digest, a magazine about British boys' story paper fiction. He wrote reports on "The Old Boys' Bookclub". Pratt is a historian on British comics and wrote reviews and drew comics in Psychopia the zine of British comics. He drew many multi artist "jam strips" in the zine including "Martian Jam" and "Stranded on the M25".

As the British Film Institute fiction film curator he brought the first screening of Stanley Long's Primitive London film. He brought to the National Film Theatre the first screening of the live-action The Adventures of Tintin film Tintin and the Golden Treasure. As National Film Archive curator he introduces Rupert Bear Night with special guests Mary Turner creator of the puppet show and Terry Jones (Monty Python).

In his spare time he plays and sings in country-folk-pop group Monogram with Stephen McConnachie and Corinna Reicher. They first performed live at The Drill Hall, London in October 2004 and they recorded their first album for the Irregular Records subsidiary label for new bands, Unlabelled. He also played and sang in humorous music hall novelty-pop group Dylan Rabbit.

He has also played the leading roles in the Hounslow films of director Jan Manthey. He has acted in films such as Teenagecstasy.

He sent a drawing of himself to Robert Crumb asking him to draw himself shaking Vic's hand. The art can be seen in the 1974 comic book Odds & Ends.
