= Psychopia =

British 1990s comic book review zine

Psychopia is a small press zine featuring reviews and articles on British comic books and small press comics and interviews with cartoonists. Unusually for comix zines it focussed almost entirely on British comics such as The Beano and The Dandy ignoring American superhero comics.

== History and profile ==
Issue #0 was the first published in 1994. Psychopia was created by cartoonist/writer B. Patston. The fanzine evolved out of his small press comic Oy Mister!! published in 1992. Like Escape Magazine it printed comic strips.

Patston drew comics in his bedroom in Linslade typing up articles on his manual typewriter. He pasted up the final pages on his card table. The zine had a very downbeat amateurish look to it due to the underground sensibilities of the editor. The misspelling Psycopia for the magazine originated with the reputation for text mangling, technical typesetting failures and typographical errors, and once misspelled its own name on the cover as "Psycopia".

Psychopia has printed comics by small press artists including "The Slap Of Doom" by Joe Berger, Ben Hunt, Lee Kennedy and "The People Under The Bed" by Vic Pratt. In addition Psychopia reprinted artwork by Darryl Cunningham and Marc Baines. Also from issue #3 Psychopia featured jam comic strips with many artists including Vic Pratt, Victor Ambrus, Caspar Williams and underground cartoonists Pete Loveday and Robert Crumb contributing to "TV Funnies" in Psychopia #5.

== Interviews ==
Psychopia features interviews with comic artists including

- Terry Bave
- Davy Francis
- Trevor Metcalfe
- David Mostyn
- Bill Ritchie
- Lew Stringer
- Daniel Clowes

At the same time Patston was offering comics for sale as a mail order distribution "Pretentious Mail Art".

It also currently exists as a website with an Image board and forums.
