= Pete Loveday =

British illustrator and cartoonist

- Born: Peter Loveday c1944
- Died: 16/04/2024 Devon
- Areas: Cartoonist; Writer
- Notable works: Russell, The Saga of a peaceful man

Pete Loveday was a British underground cartoonist. He is best known for his series of comics charting the adventures of hippie character Russell, including Big Bang Comics, Big Trip Travel Agency and Plain Rapper Comix printed by AK Press.

Since its initial publication in 1981, Big Bang Comics is Britain's most successful underground comic book series. His style is reminiscent of US underground comic creators Robert Crumb and Gilbert Shelton, with a similar use of cross-hatching. Recurring themes in Loveday's comics are drugs, Rock festivals, and environmentalism. Plain Rapper Comix #2 is Loveday's pamphlet in comic book form on a history of hemp and why it would be beneficial for the environment to replace tree paper with hemp paper. This was the first publication in modern times to be printed on such paper. The Russell comics have been collected in book form, Russell, The Saga of a peaceful man published by John Brown Publishing.

The character of Russell reappeared in the Big Trip Travel Agency series published by AK Press in six volumes released between 1995 and 2012. Issue 2 notably featured The Levellers. After Big Trip 5 (1999), Russell's story was to be continued in Volume 6, which it seemed would never appear. Then in 2012, to many fan's delight, AKPress made Big Trip 6 available through their website and through a mainstream Internet retailer where some reviews of Loveday's classic comics can also be read.

As a champion of British small press comics, he drew many multi-artist jam strips in B. Patston's Psychopia. He drew a Russell comic in Danny King's Blah, Blah, Blah!

He used to have a stall at Glastonbury Festival, selling his comics and other items and then, after a gap of more than a decade, had a stall at the Secret Garden Party and Beautiful Days, both festivals for which he produced artwork.

He experienced some problems with his eyesight although he remained prolific, producing a wide range of artwork including advertising posters (including an unlikely 1998 campaign for Nike) through greetings cards, postcards, CD and record sleeve designs, book illustrations to flyers, and T-shirt designs.

In July 2018, Freedom Seeds, a UK based seed bank, named a cannabis strain ‘Big Trip’ in tribute to Loveday. Pete created a logo for the product.

Loveday attributed his black sense of humour to having spent the 1969 Summer of Love disembowelling chickens in a poultry processing factory, a traumatic experience that left him with a morbid fear of eggs.

His death was confirmed on 17/04/2024 by his son Mark.
