= Daniel Acon =

American special effects coordinator

Daniel Acon (born January 24, 1958 Rome) is an American Special Effects Coordinator and Supervisor.

He graduated from Seton Hall University. He has created the special effects for many blockbuster movies and primetime TV shows. Daniel Acon has been nominated for 2 primetime Emmy awards, 2002 and 2007 for Art Directing Sting's television concert "Sting ...All this time", and for the special effects on HBO's Rome television series. His television series Rome was nominated for the Royal Television Society.

He has worked with film directors such as Martin Scorsese on Gangs of New York, Mel Gibson on The Passion of Christ, J.J. Abrams, on Mission: Impossible III, Ridley Scott's Hannibal, and recently with director Spike Lee on Miracle at St. Anna.

His current special effects filmography is issued on IMDb and consists of the following motion pictures and television movies and series:

- Angels and Demons directed by Ron Howard
- Miracle at St. Anna by Spike Lee
- Jumper
- Mission: Impossible III
- The Life Aquatic with Steve Zissou
- Eros
- The Passion of the Christ
- The Order
- Gangs of New York
- Hannibal
- Malèna
- U-571
- A Midsummer Night's Dream
- Legionnaire
- Double Team
- Daylight
- Cliffhanger
- The Godfather Part III
- Rome (TV)
- Ghostboat
- Judas
- My House in Umbria and Samson and Delilah (TV movie)
