= Garson Yu =

Garson Yu is a Hong Kong-born American designer. He is the founder and creative director of yU+co in Hollywood, California.

== Biography ==
Garson Yu was born in Hong Kong in 1961. Garson attended the Yale School of Art, on the Norman Ives Scholarship in 1985. Upon graduating with the Alexei Brodovitch Prize in 1987, Garson started his career in New York as a freelance designer at R/Greenberg Associates.

Garson taught graphic design at the School of Visual Arts and exhibited as an artist in New York. He has had group exhibitions at the Artist Space, PS1/Clock Tower Gallery and The Dia Art Foundation. Garson’s design entry won the International AIDS design competition. He was then commissioned by the New York Public Art Fund to design and produce a 30-second television Public Service Announcement on AIDS. In 1992, he worked with Muriel Cooper at the MIT Media Lab to design IBM’s ‘Future Interface Demo’.

In 1993, Garson moved to Los Angeles and served as co-creative director alongside Kyle Cooper for what was, at the time, the West coast branch of R/GA but would later be reformed as Imaginary Forces. In 1998, Garson founded yU+co, a design company specializing in motion graphics for film and television. Since the company’s inception, Garson has collaborated with many filmmakers for his title design work including Steven Spielberg, Ang Lee, John Woo, Sydney Pollack, and Ridley and Tony Scott.

Garson has won numerous awards and honors for his title design and motion graphics work including a Daytime Emmy for Outstanding Achievement in Title Design for Dora the Explorer and five other Emmy nominations, the New York Art Directors Club Award, three BDA Awards, Monitor Award, ID Magazine International Design Award, HOW Magazine International Design Award, AIGA Design Award and the Eyes and Ears of Europe Award. Garson is also a visiting lecturer for film title design at Carnegie Mellon University, USA, Cologne International Film School, Germany and Central Academy of Fine Arts School of Design, China. He is also a member of Alliance Graphique Internationale, Switzerland.
