= Chris Donovan (director) =

Chris Donovan is a television director and producer who is the long-time director of the televised Golden Globe Awards, and other television gala specials. He received a bachelor's degree in theater from the University of Connecticut in 1969.

Most recently, he directed The 38th Annual Daytime Emmy Awards which was televised live on June 19, 2011; and also the 2011 Primetime Creative Arts Emmy Awards which was televised on September 17, 2011.

Donovan has been nominated for four Emmy Awards, three of them for his work on the 1990s Home Improvement television series.
