= Joe Berger (illustrator) =

British cartoonist and book illustrator

- Born: 1970 (age 55–56) Bristol, England
- Areas: Cartoonist, artist

Joe Berger is an illustrator and cartoonist from Bristol.

He has been making films, illustrating and cartooning since 1991. In 1992 he drew his own British small press comics Shooba heavily influenced by underground cartoonist Robert Crumb. These were autobiographical strips and a surreal strip Drift Dream with a tank rolling down the street same as Ingmar Bergman's The Silence.

He drew "The Slap of Doom" in Psychopia.

In 1993 he drew The Artist with writer Mike Von Joel a picture book about how a talentless Neo-conceptual art student makes it big in the art world similar to Young British Artists Damien Hirst. It has recently been republished.

He often works with writer/sound magician Pascal Wyse. Every Friday Since 2003, Berger and Wyse have produced The Pitchers comic strip in The Guardian. It is about the madness of Hollywood seen through the eyes of a pair of scriptwriters.

He is currently working on his first children's book Bridget Fidget.

He also plays shortstop for the Bangers, a coed softball team based in Mesa, Arizona.

== Works ==
Illustrations

- Whip Your Life into Shape (2005), a self-help book
- How to Change Your Life the Guardian (2005), G2 cover
- Bloggers Guide the Guardian (2005), travel cover

Book covers

- My Latest Grievance, Elinor Lipman (2006) Headline
- The Pitch, by Eileen Quinn and Judy Counihan (2006) Faber
- The Apologist, by Jay Rayner (2004) Atlantic Books
- The Hamster that liked Puccini, by Simon Hoggart (2005) Atlantic Books/Guardian Books
