= Thomas Cobb (director) =

Thomas Cobb is an American director, editor, compositor, and cinematographer who directed the opening credit sequence for "Orange Is the New Black".
