= Kyle Cooper =

American designer (born 1962)

- Born: July 13, 1962 (age 64); Salem, Massachusetts, U.S.
- Education: University of Massachusetts Amherst (BA); Yale School of Art (MFA)
- Known for: Title sequence design
- Website: prologue.com

Kyle Cooper (born 1962) is an American designer known for his main title sequence work. He has produced and directed over 350 visual effects and title sequences for motion pictures and broadcast.

== Early life ==
=== Childhood ===
Cooper was born July 13, 1962, a Friday the 13th, in Salem, Massachusetts. As a child, he spent his days sketching monsters. He was fascinated by comic books, monster makeup books, and horror films. Cooper stated in an interview with Revert to Saved that he had always wanted to be a film director: "I've always been interested in film and editing—more specifically, the juxtaposition of images in film or on a single page. However, I felt it more comprehensive to tell stories over time. Print design can provide great single moments, but I wanted to work with a sequence that had a beginning, middle and end".

=== Education ===
Cooper attended the University of Massachusetts Amherst, studying interior architecture. While struggling academically, he convinced his professor to let him pass by promising never to work as an interior designer.

He then earned his Master of Fine Arts in graphic design at Yale University in 1988. During his time there, he studied independently with American modernist Paul Rand. Cooper wrote his thesis on director Sergei Eisenstein and received the Mohawk Paper Traveling Fellowship to complete his research in the then Soviet Union.

== Career ==
=== Early work ===
After graduating with his M.F.A. from the Yale School of Art, Cooper worked at R/GA (then known as R/Greenberg Associates) from 1988 to 1996, first in New York City and then Los Angeles. Cooper created the title sequence for the 1995 American crime film Seven, a seminal work that received critical acclaim and is credited with inspiring younger designers for years to come. According to Cooper, at the time he made the title sequence for Seven, main title sequences lagged behind developments in print, music videos, and commercials. Cooper has stated he aimed to create main titles that would raise the bar creatively for future title sequences.

=== Founded companies ===
In 1996, Cooper founded Imaginary Forces with Peter Frankfurt and Chip Houghton. Imaginary Forces became one of the most successful creative agencies in Hollywood to emerge from the West Coast division of R/GA. "We have spent a long time building and refining a brilliant creative and production team… Keeping this group together as our own company is truly exciting," commented Cooper about the name change. Finding himself too involved with the business side of running a design company the size of Imaginary Forces, Cooper decided to focus more on his creative work. In 2003, he left Imaginary Forces and founded Prologue, a creative agency where he works with a small team, focusing on creating title sequences.

=== Influences ===
Cooper has cited Stephen Frankfurt's opening title sequence for To Kill a Mockingbird as his most significant influence in his choice of profession. Cooper also draws inspiration from William Shakespeare; his former production company, Imaginary Forces, takes its name from a line in the prologue of Shakespeare's Henry V. The idea to name the company after this prologue is based on the concept that opening titles often act like a prologue to a film. This can also be seen as an influence on his current company, Prologue. Wired noted Cooper is not typically hired for a signature "style" but to "dig under the celluloid and tap into the symbolism of a film". This was a precedent he started with some of his earliest work, notably Seven.

=== Seven title sequence ===
Cooper's work on David Fincher's film Seven is arguably his best-known work. The sequence is notable for its use of tabletop photography and tactile techniques. Industry website Art-of-the-Title describes the process: "The typography itself... was hand-etched into black-surface scratchboard and manipulated during the film transfer process to further smear and jitter it." Rather than use digital techniques, Cooper's team largely assembled the sequence by hand.

== Awards and acclaim ==
Cooper has been credited by Details magazine with "almost single-handedly revitalizing the main title sequence as an art form". Los Angeles magazine calls him the "Da Vinci of main titles". Creativity magazine named him "one of the top 50 biggest and best creative thinkers from the last 20 years of advertising and consumer culture". Wired magazine stated, "Not since Saul Bass' legendary preludes … have credits attracted such attention".

Cooper is a member of the Academy of Motion Picture Arts and Sciences and holds the title of honorary Royal Designer for Industry from the Royal Society of Arts in London. He has received seven Emmy nominations and two wins. In 2014, he received the lifetime achievement medal from the American Institute of Graphic Arts, recognizing him for designing title sequences for film and television with a "bold and unexpected style".

== Selected title sequences ==
- The Laser Man (1988)
- She-Devil (1989)
- Bird on a Wire (1990)
- Home Alone (1990)
- Narrow Margin (1990)
- Men of Respect (1990)
- The Bonfire of the Vanities (1990)
- The Hard Way (1991)
- Curly Sue (1991)
- Don't Tell Mom the Babysitter's Dead (1991)
- McBain (1991)
- Passenger 57 (1992)
- Newsies (1992)
- Zebrahead (1992)
- Home Alone 2 (1992)
- Used People (1992)
- The Joy Luck Club (1993)
- Body Snatchers (1993)
- Indecent Proposal (1993)
- Rising Sun (1993)
- Matinee (1993)
- Amos & Andrew (1993)
- Last Action Hero (1993)
- Sister Act 2 (1993)
- Carlito's Way (1993)
- Homicide: Life on the Street (1993)
- True Lies (1994)
- Angels in the Outfield (1994)
- Immortal Beloved (1994)
- The Getaway (1994)
- When a Man Loves a Woman (1994)
- Wolf (1994)
- North (1994)
- Richie Rich (1994)
- Quiz Show (1994)
- Braveheart (1995)
- Seven (1995)
- Nixon (1995)
- The American President (1995)
- Dead Presidents (1995)
- The Island of Dr. Moreau (1996)
- Mission: Impossible (1996)
- Twister (1996)
- Eraser (1996)
- Gotti (1996)
- The Fan (1996)
- White Squall (1996)
- Ghosts of Mississippi (1996)
- Bogus (1996)
- The Juror (1996)
- Celtic Pride (1996)
- Flubber (1997)
- Mimic (1997)
- Donnie Brasco (1997)
- Men in Black (1997)
- Gattaca (1997)
- George Wallace (1997)
- Mousehunt (1997)
- Metro (1997)
- Nightwatch (1997)
- Volcano (1997)
- Men with Guns (1997)
- Red Corner (1997)
- G.I. Jane (1997)
- The Practice (1997)
- The Mask of Zorro (1998)
- Fallen (1998)
- The Horse Whisperer (1998)
- Sphere (1998)
- The Avengers (1998)
- The Negotiator (1998)
- The Rat Pack (1998)
- Lost in Space (1998)
- Without Limits (1998)
- Mighty Joe Young (1998)
- The Parent Trap (1998)
- Arlington Road (1999)
- The Mummy (1999)
- Three Kings (1999)
- Pushing Tin (1999)
- Wild Wild West (1999)
- The General's Daughter (1999)
- Forces of Nature (1999)
- The Story of Us (1999)
- Reindeer Games (2000)
- The Crossing (2000)
- Along Came a Spider (2001)
- The Mummy Returns (2001)
- K-Pax (2001)
- Zoolander (2001)
- Metal Gear Solid 2: Sons of Liberty (2001)
- Spider-Man (2002)
- Minority Report (2002)
- One Hour Photo (2002)
- Path to War (2002)
- Boomtown (2002)
- Dreamcatcher (2003)
- Darkness Falls (2003)
- Identity (2003)
- Angels in America (2003)
- The Rundown (2003)
- Dawn of the Dead (2004)
- Spider-Man 2 (2004)
- Godzilla: Final Wars (2004)
- Metal Gear Solid 3: Snake Eater (2004)
- The New World (2005)
- Superman Returns (2006)
- Scarface: The World Is Yours (2006)
- Spider-Man 3 (2007)
- Across the Universe (2007)
- Iron Man (2008)
- The Incredible Hulk (2008)
- Tropic Thunder (2008)
- Orphan (2009)
- Sherlock Holmes (2009)
- Tron: Legacy (2010)
- A Nightmare on Elm Street (2010)
- The Walking Dead (2010)
- Arthur (2011)
- American Horror Story (2011)
- Final Destination 5 (2011)
- The Secret Life Of Walter Mitty (2013)
- Godzilla (2014)
- Metal Gear Solid V: The Phantom Pain (2015)
- Scream Queens (2015)
- Limitless (2015)
- Feud (2017)
- Resident Evil 2 (Remake) (2019)
- Death Stranding (2019)
- Godzilla: King of the Monsters (2019)
- Godzilla vs. Kong (2021)
- Death Stranding 2: On the Beach (2025)
- Metal Gear Solid Delta: Snake Eater (2025)
