= An Ideal Husband (2000 film) =

2000 film

- Directed by: William P. Cartlidge
- Written by: William P. Cartlidge
- Based on: An Ideal Husband; 1885 play by Oscar Wilde
- Produced by: Daniel Figuero
- Starring: James Wilby; Sadie Frost
- Cinematography: Jake Polonsky
- Edited by: Matthew Glen
- Music by: Nigel Hess
- Distributed by: ILC Prime
- Release date: 2000
- Running time: 90 minutes
- Country: United Kingdom
- Language: English

An Ideal Husband is a 2000 film based on the 1895 play An Ideal Husband by Oscar Wilde.

== Plot ==
While the film retains the premise of Wilde's play and much of the original dialogue, it updates the action to the present day. The external scenes of the film were shot at various locations in the English 'home counties', principally in Buckinghamshire.

Sir Robert Chiltern, a rich landowner, belongs to the English 'county set' and is a member of an (unnamed) local government authority somewhere north of London. Well-off and with a loving and trusting wife, his honour and very existence are threatened when Mrs. Laura Cheveley appears with evidence of a past misdeed of Sir Robert's. It transpires that Robert's wealth stems from insider trading concerning a proposed canal project at an unspecified location.

She attempts to blackmail Sir Robert into supporting the project - in which she has invested heavily - and in desperation, Sir Robert turns for help to his friend Lord Goring, an apparently idle philanderer. Goring knows the lady from years before.

After several varieties of machination, the story ends happily. Lord Goring marries Robert's sister Mabel, Mrs. Chevely is outsmarted, and Lady Chiltern retains her faith in her husband's honour and 'idealism'.

== Cast ==
- Trevyn McDowell – Lady Gertrude Chiltern
- Jonathan Firth – Lord Arthur Goring
- Sadie Frost – Mrs. Laura Cheveley
- James Wilby – Sir Robert Chiltern
- Robert Hardy – Lord Caversham
- Prunella Scales – Lady Markby
- Helena Hughes – James the servant
