= An Ideal Husband (disambiguation) =

An Ideal Husband is an 1895 comedic stage play by Oscar Wilde.

An Ideal Husband may also refer to the following adaptations:

- An Ideal Husband (1935 film), starring Brigitte Helm and Sybille Schmitz
- An Ideal Husband (1947 British film), starring Paulette Goddard and Michael Wilding
- An Ideal Husband (1947 Argentine film), starring Santiago Gómez Cou, Alicia Barrié and Golde Flami
- An Ideal Husband (1980 film), starring Lyudmila Gurchenko and Yury Yakovlev
- An Ideal Husband (1999 film), starring Julianne Moore and Rupert Everett
- An Ideal Husband (2000 film), featuring Sadie Frost and James Wilby
