= Cinderella (2015 American film) =

2015 film by Kenneth Branagh

- Theatrical release poster
- Directed by: Kenneth Branagh
- Screenplay by: Chris Weitz
- Based on: Disney's Cinderella; "Cendrillon" by Charles Perrault
- Produced by: Simon Kinberg; Allison Shearmur; David Barron
- Starring: Cate Blanchett; Lily James; Richard Madden; Stellan Skarsgård; Holliday Grainger; Derek Jacobi; Helena Bonham Carter
- Cinematography: Haris Zambarloukos
- Edited by: Martin Walsh
- Music by: Patrick Doyle
- Production companies: Walt Disney Pictures; Kinberg Genre; Beagle Pug Films; Allison Shearmur Productions
- Distributed by: Walt Disney Studios; Motion Pictures
- Release dates: February 13, 2015 (Berlinale); March 13, 2015 (United States); March 27, 2015 (United Kingdom)
- Running time: 106 minutes
- Countries: United States; United Kingdom
- Language: English
- Budget: $95 million
- Box office: $543.5 million

Cinderella is a 2015 romantic fantasy film directed by Kenneth Branagh and written by Chris Weitz. It is a live-action adaptation of the fairy tale of the same name, and Walt Disney's 1950 animated film. It stars Lily James as Cinderella, with an ensemble cast including Cate Blanchett, Richard Madden, Stellan Skarsgård, Holliday Grainger, Sophie McShera, Derek Jacobi, and Helena Bonham Carter.

Development for Cinderella began in May 2010, with producer Simon Kinberg and screenwriter Aline Brosh McKenna attached to the project. Mark Romanek was initially set to direct in August 2011, but was fired by January 2013 due to creative differences with Disney and was replaced by Branagh, while Weitz was hired to revise McKenna's script. Casting began in November 2012, with Blanchett being the first actor to be cast. James signed on to portray the title role in April 2013, and the rest of the cast joined between May and September 2013. Principal photography took place at Pinewood Studios in Buckinghamshire, England, from September to December 2013.

Cinderella premiered at the 65th Berlin International Film Festival on February 13, 2015, and was released theatrically in the United States on March 13 by Walt Disney Studios Motion Pictures, in conjunction with the animated film's 65th anniversary. It grossed $543 million worldwide and received positive reviews from critics. It was nominated for costume design at the 88th Academy Awards, 21st Critics' Choice Awards, and 69th British Academy Film Awards.

== Plot ==
Ella, the kindhearted daughter of a wealthy merchant, lives happily with her parents. Ella's mother becomes ill; on her deathbed, she instructs Ella to always have courage and be kind. Years later, Ella's father marries the widowed Lady Tremaine, who has two daughters of her own, Drisella and Anastasia. After overhearing that Ella's father still misses his first wife, Lady Tremaine becomes bitterly jealous. When Ella's father leaves on a business trip, Lady Tremaine persuades Ella to give up her large bedroom to her stepsisters and move into the attic. Ella's father dies of illness during the journey, and Lady Tremaine dismisses all the household servants to save money, forcing their duties upon Ella instead. Seeing her face covered in cinders after sleeping by the fireplace, Ella's stepfamily mockingly dubs her "Cinderella".

Distraught by her stepfamily's mistreatment of her, Ella goes for a ride in the woods. There, she comes across a stag hunt, and meets Kit, the crown prince, who introduces himself as a palace apprentice. They take a liking to each other, but part without him learning her name. Back at the palace, Kit learns that his terminally ill father plans to throw a royal ball, so Kit may choose a princess to marry. Kit persuades the king to invite all the eligible maidens in the land, secretly hoping Ella will come.

Ella, also wanting to see Kit again, refashions her mother's old dress and attempts to join her stepfamily at the ball. However, they rip her dress and leave her behind. Ella runs into the garden in tears, and meets an old beggar woman, who reveals herself to be her fairy godmother. She magically transforms a pumpkin into a carriage, mice into horses, lizards into footmen, and a goose into a coachman. She then bestows Ella an exquisite blue ball gown and glass slippers. After casting a final spell to prevent Ella's stepfamily from recognizing her, the Fairy Godmother warns her the magic will end at the last stroke of midnight.

When Ella arrives at the ball, Kit is delighted to see her, and gives her the first dance. The Grand Duke, who promised Kit to Princess Chelina of Zaragoza for political reasons, expresses annoyance and is overheard by Lady Tremaine. Although surprised to learn Kit is the prince, Ella bonds with him, and they fall deeper in love. However, before she can tell him her name, she hears the clock chime close to midnight, and she flees the palace, losing one of her glass slippers. The Grand Duke pursues her, but Ella manages to hide right before the magic dissipates.

The next morning, Lady Tremaine notices Ella acting unusually jolly when hearing about the events at the ball, and becomes suspicious. On his deathbed, the King gives Kit his blessing to marry Ella. As the new King, Kit issues a proclamation professing his love for "the mysterious princess who wore glass slippers to the ball" and requests she present herself. Ella hurries to retrieve the slipper to prove her identity, but Lady Tremaine finds it first. She attempts to blackmail Ella into making her the head of the royal household, but Ella refuses. Lady Tremaine breaks the slipper and locks Ella in the attic. She brings the remains to the Grand Duke, and reveals the truth to him. He agrees to make Lady Tremaine a countess and secure advantageous marriages for her daughters, and to keep Ella hidden forever.

Suspecting the Grand Duke is plotting something, Kit orders the Grand Duke and the Captain of the Guard to find the mystery princess by trying the intact slipper on every woman in the kingdom. At Ella's house, the shoe fits neither stepsister, and the company prepares to depart, until they hear Ella singing in the attic. Kit, who has secretly accompanied the group, commands the Captain to investigate, forcing Lady Tremaine to release Ella. Ella successfully tries on the slipper and, as she leaves with Kit, forgives her stepmother. Soon afterward, Lady Tremaine, her daughters, and the Grand Duke leave the kingdom permanently, while Ella and Kit marry and become its most beloved monarchs, ruling with the same courage and kindness that Ella had promised her mother.

== Cast ==
- Cate Blanchett as Lady Tremaine, Ella's bitter, jealous stepmother, who resents her stepdaughter for her unbreakable spirit and kindness. Blanchett described her character as a "woman who has tried to start her life again, and becomes intensely jealous of the deep affection that her new husband has for his daughter, Cinderella. She's not as beautiful and not as kind and as good as Cinderella. When Cinderella's father dies, the financial pressures, the panic and the jealousy grow... that is what makes her wicked."
- Lily James as Ella, also known as Cinderella, a strong-willed and kind-hearted young woman who is forced to become a maidservant in her own house by her stepfamily. James described her character as a "kind, good person that is able to be happy in a cruel environment, and that is her superpower... I think we have to, to get through life, which can throw us off. I think what's amazing about Ella is that she's the best version of herself, at all times."
  - Eloise Webb as 10-year-old Ella.
- Richard Madden as Prince Kit, a humble and noble soon-to-be king who falls in love with Ella, despite his duty to marry the princess for the good of his kingdom. Madden described his character as "someone who had a sense of humor and who is aware of his own privilege and who has compassion for everyone around him."
- Helena Bonham Carter as the Fairy Godmother, a ditzy yet caring sorceress who helps Ella get to the ball. She also serves as the film's narrator. Bonham Carter's casting is a homage to Verna Felton, who voiced the character in the 1950 animated film, and also The Queen of Hearts in Alice in Wonderland a year later whom Bonham Carter played a hybrid version of the character and the Red Queen in the 2010 live-action adaptation and 2016 sequel.
- Nonso Anozie as the Captain, Kit's sarcastic yet loyal best friend and confidant. Anozie described his character as "somebody who's a bit of a role model and somebody who's rooting for him [Kit] to get what he wants."
- Stellan Skarsgård as the Grand Duke, a shady and calculating royal functionary who seeks the prosperity of the kingdom by questionable actions. Unlike his animated counterpart, this version of the character is portrayed in a more antagonistic light. Skarsgård described his character as someone who "runs the show, is very pragmatic, and doesn't approve of the absolutely silly idea that anyone should marry out of love, the Prince included."
- Sophie McShera and Holliday Grainger as Drisella and Anastasia Tremaine, Lady Tremaine's vain and shallow biological daughters and Ella's stepsisters. McShera described their characters as "pretty vile, but we look ridiculous, so you can't help but feel a bit sorry for us sometimes", while Grainger elaborated that "they are both so needy and look up to their mother so much that they have no self-esteem, which manifests itself through jealousy and selfishness directed toward Cinderella."
- Derek Jacobi as the King, Kit's strict yet loving father who wants him to marry both for his own good and for the good of the kingdom. Jacobi described his character as "very traditional in that he wants his son to inherit a safe and secure kingdom, which means he needs to enter into a mutually-advantageous marriage."

The film also features Ben Chaplin and Hayley Atwell as Ella's biological parents. Additionally, Rob Brydon plays Master Phineus, the royal painter. Jana Pérez portrays Princess Chelina of Zaragoza, Kit's unwanted suitor, whom the Grand Duke wants him to marry. Alex Macqueen appears as the Royal Crier. Tom Edden and Gareth Mason play Lizard Footman and Goose Coachman, the human forms of Ella's animal friends. Paul Hunter portrays John, a farmer who works for Ella's family. Joshua McGuire appears as the Palace Official. Josh O'Connor appears as the Ballroom Palace Guard.

== Production ==
=== Development ===
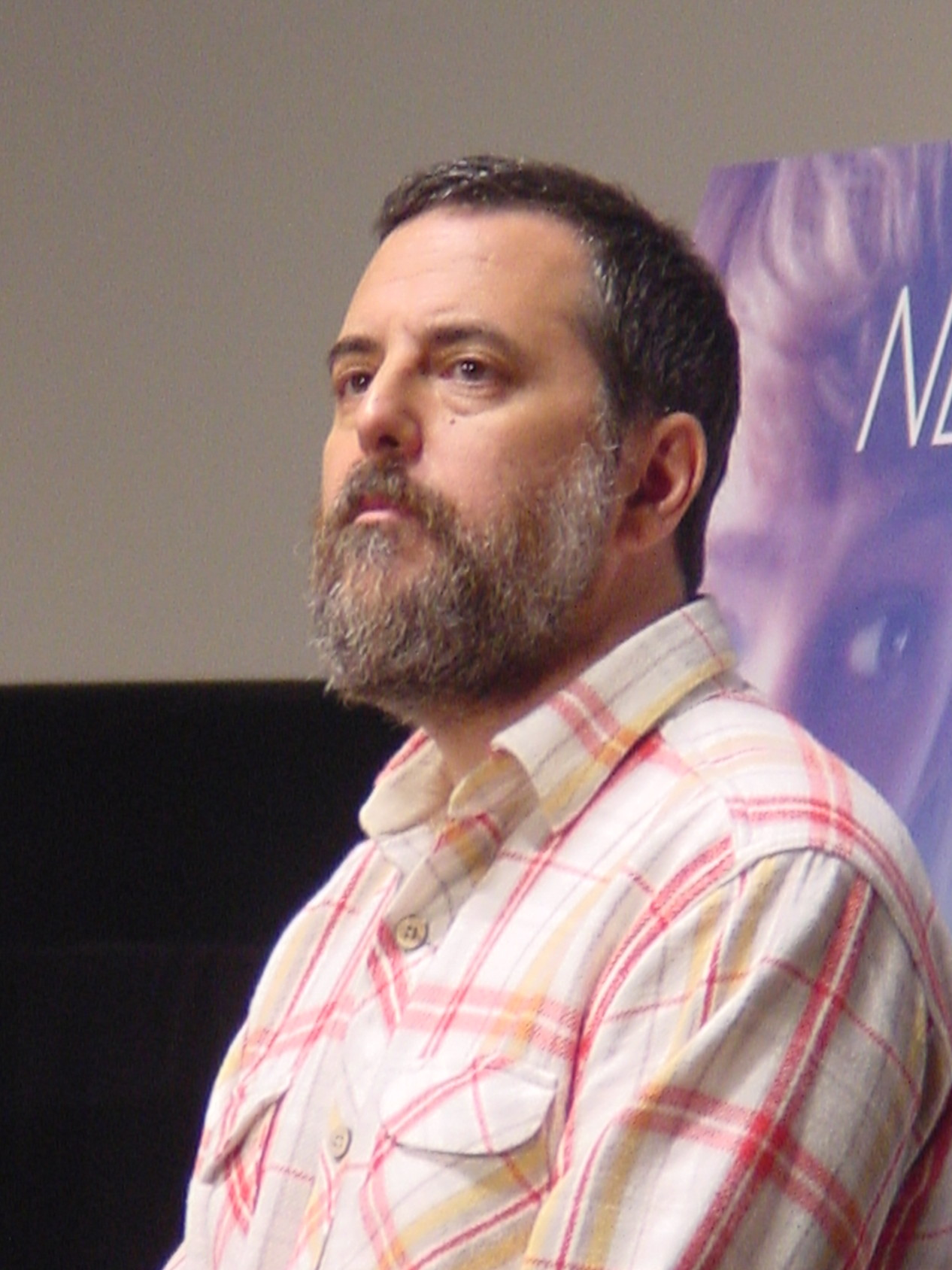
Mark Romanek was attached to direct the film from August 2011 to January 2013.

Walt Disney Pictures began developing a live-action reimagining of Charles Perrault's fairy tale Cinderella in May 2010, following the box-office success of Tim Burton's Alice in Wonderland (2010). The studio made a seven-figure pitch deal with Aline Brosh McKenna and Simon Kinberg, who were set as screenwriter and producer, respectively. According to Sean Bailey, studio chairman Alan F. Horn wanted to make the film a "definitive Cinderella for generations to come", and told him that if he needed to "spend a little more, spend it, to make sure it's one for the time capsule".

McKenna's initial drafts suggested a "swashbuckling" take on the story, with the prince being groomed for a politically arranged marriage until he meets Cinderella, recast as a knight, whom McKenna described as "somebody who's learning to go after what she wants. Basically, she gets separated from the prince and has to find her way back to him, but it's more complicated than that. She's very active and independent". However, the idea was discarded, since the studio needed a more "recognizable" approach to the story.

In August 2011, Mark Romanek was hired to direct the film, with Chris Weitz brought on to revise McKenna's script in February 2012. Romanek supervised the project for fifteen months, envisioning a film that would be like "Barry Lyndon but with magic". In January 2013, it was reported that Romanek left the project due to creative differences with Disney, as his vision of the film was darker than the studio wanted. However, he would later clarify that he did not leave the project willingly, but was fired when an executive change occurred at Disney. Later that month, Kenneth Branagh was announced to take over as director, and by April 2013, Allison Shearmur and David Barron were hired as producers.

=== Casting ===
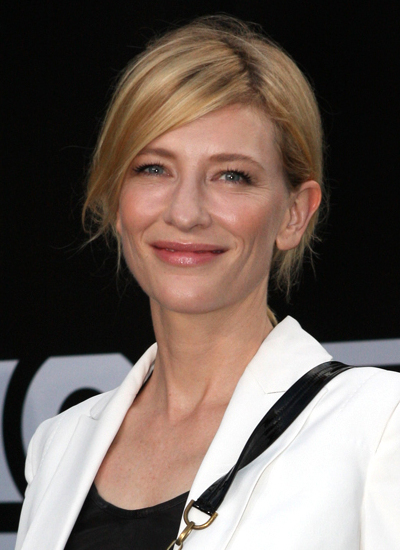
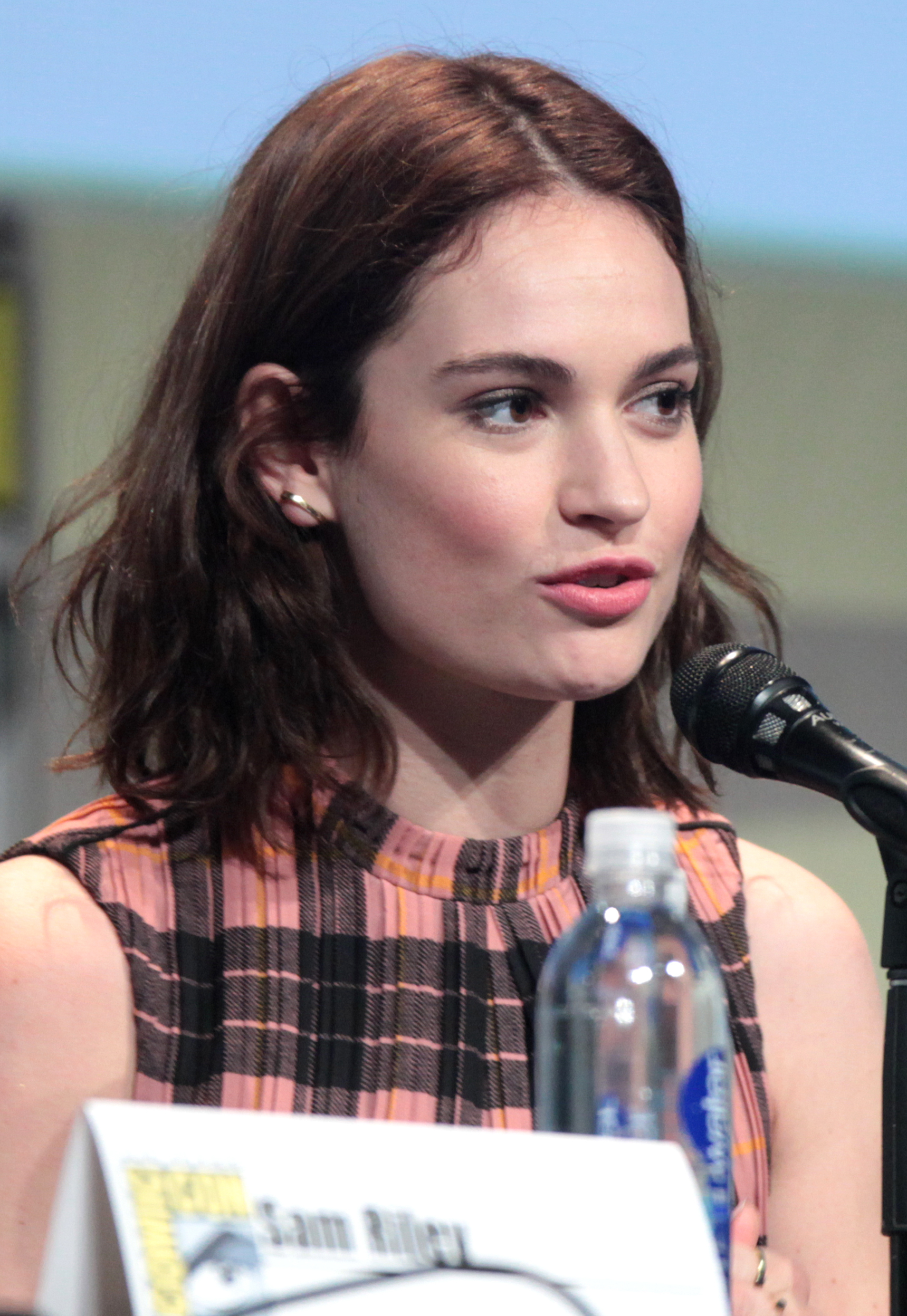
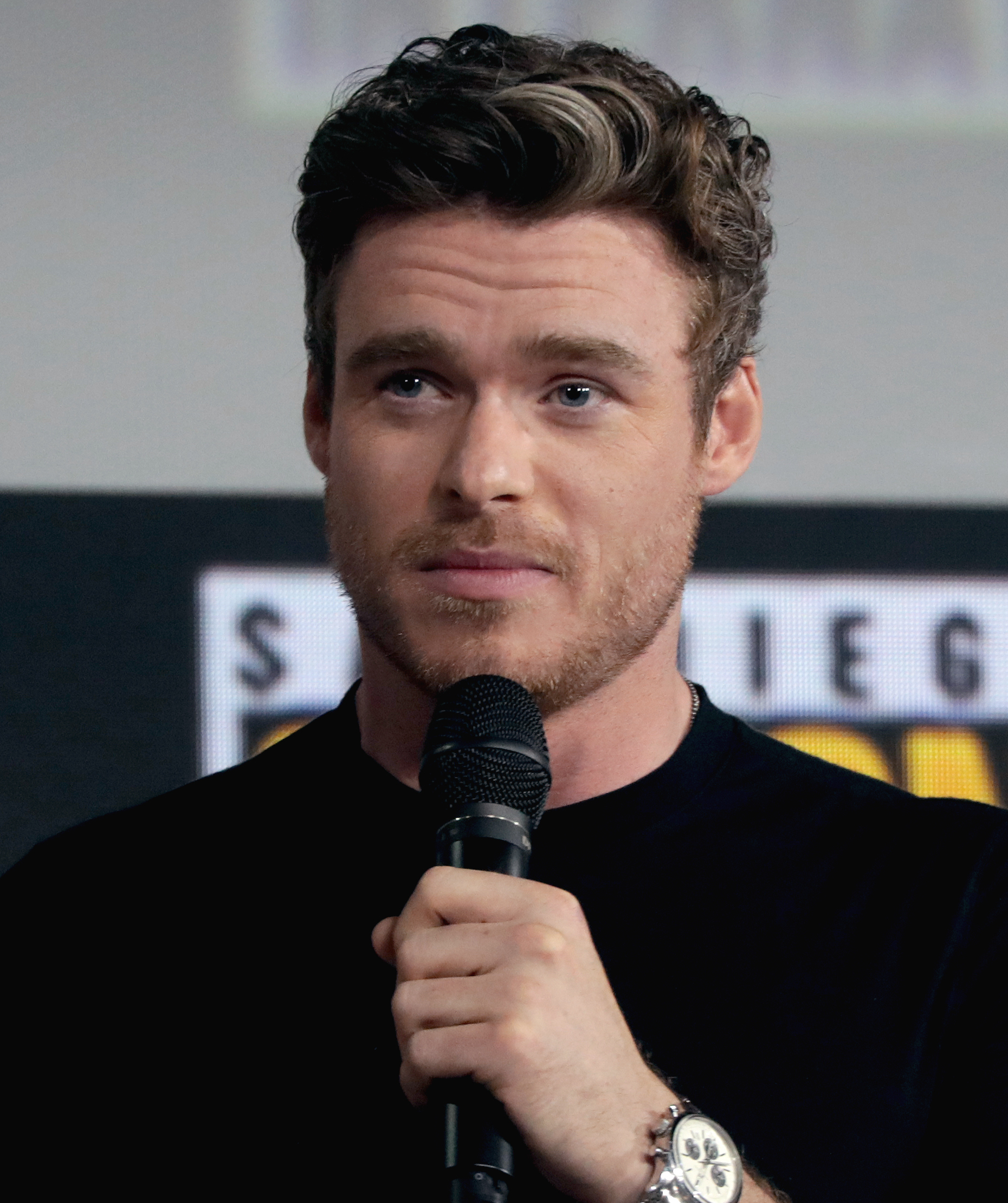
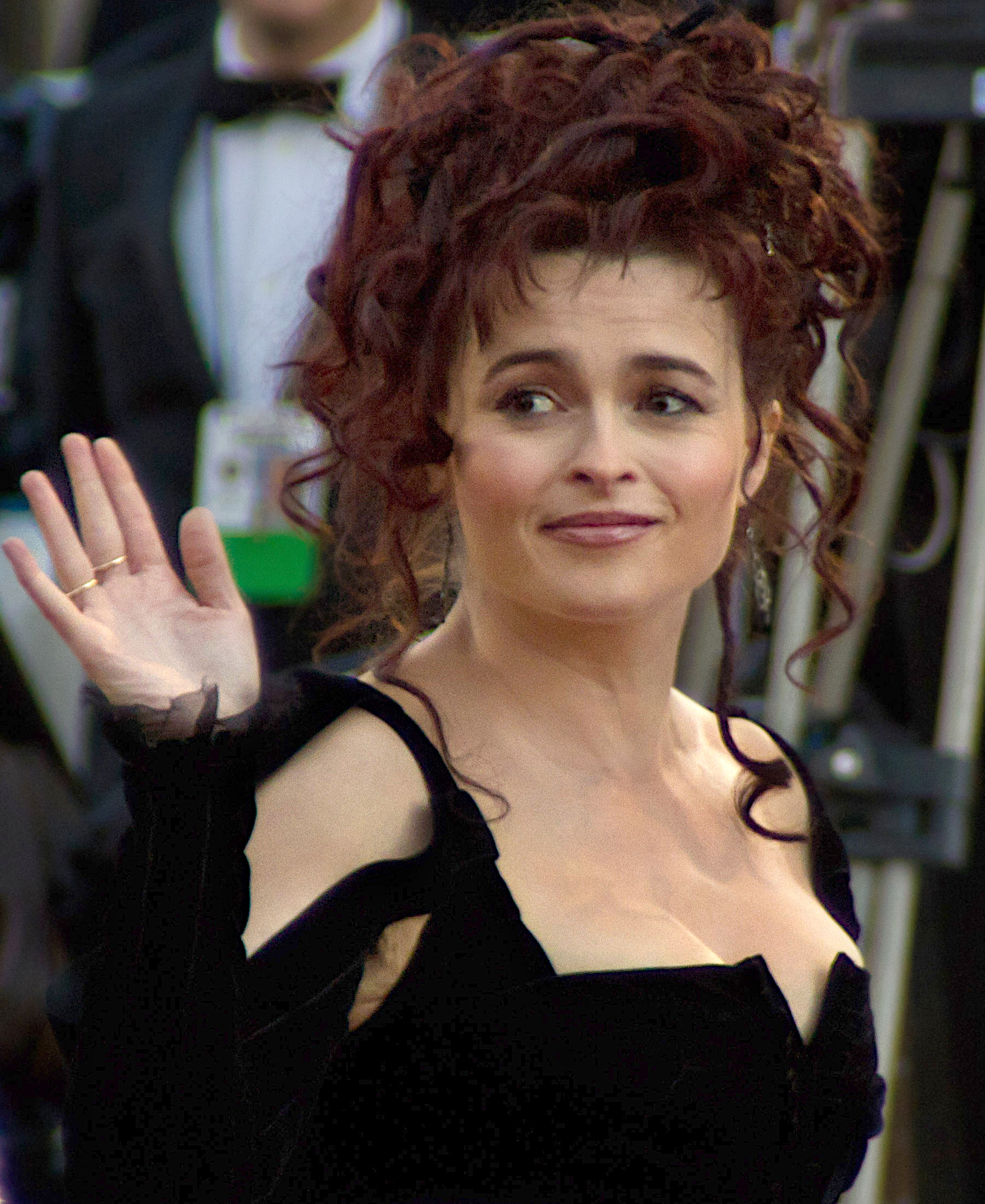
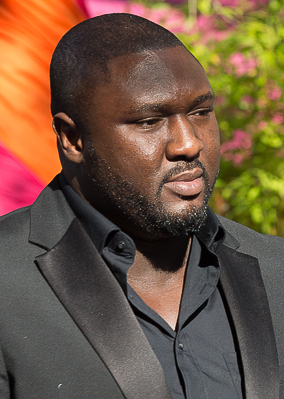
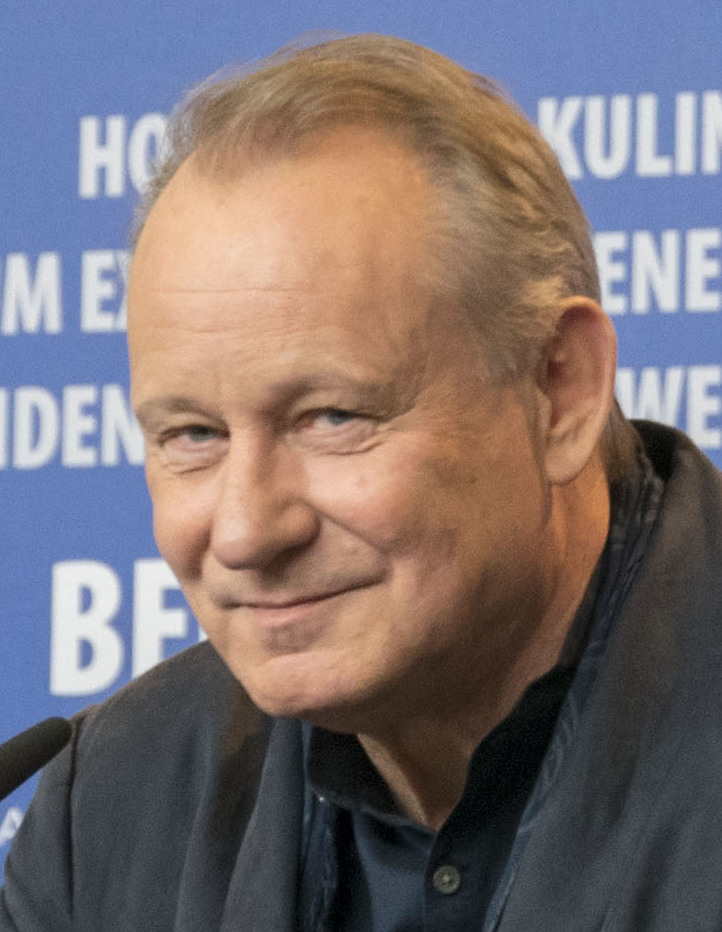
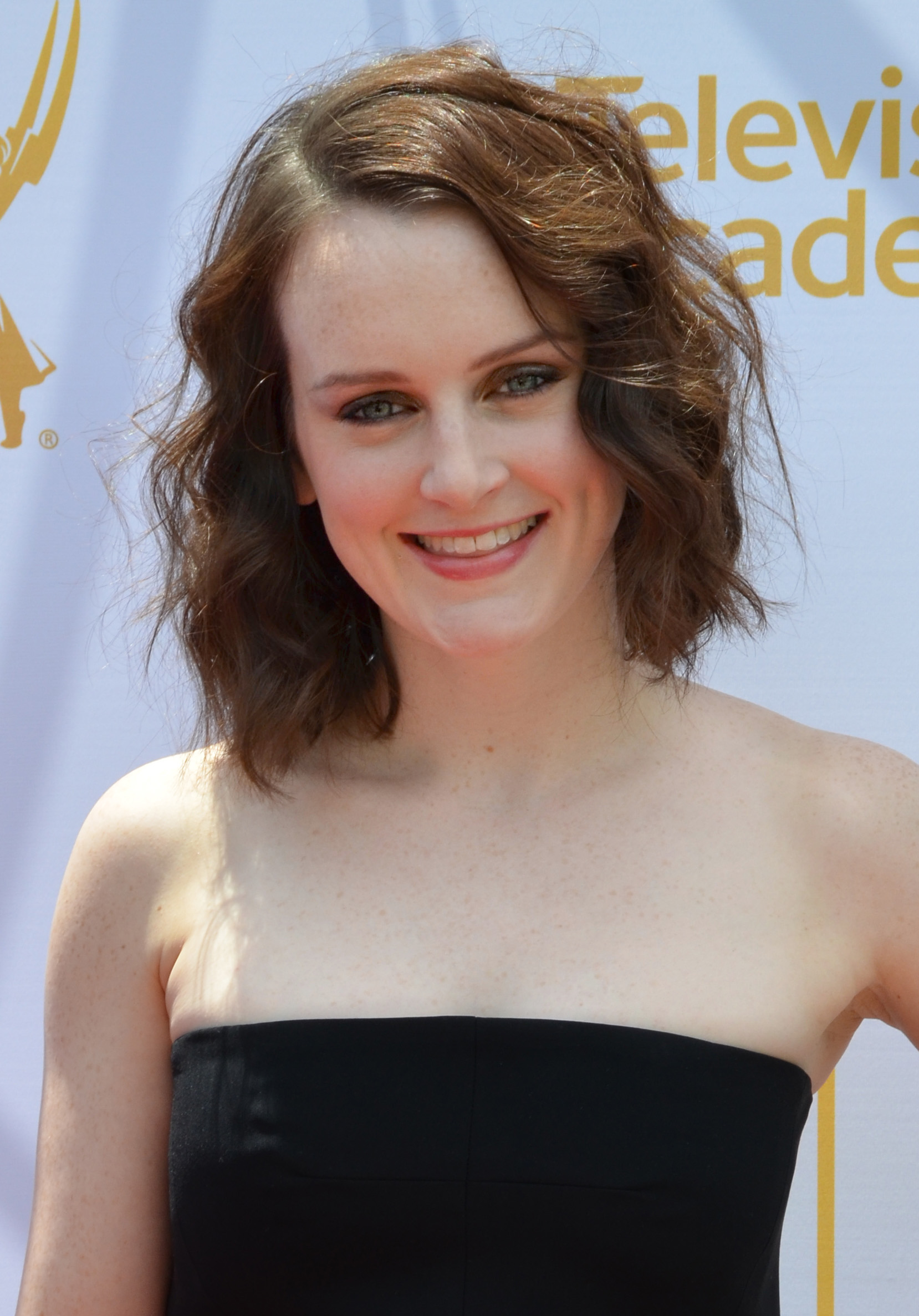
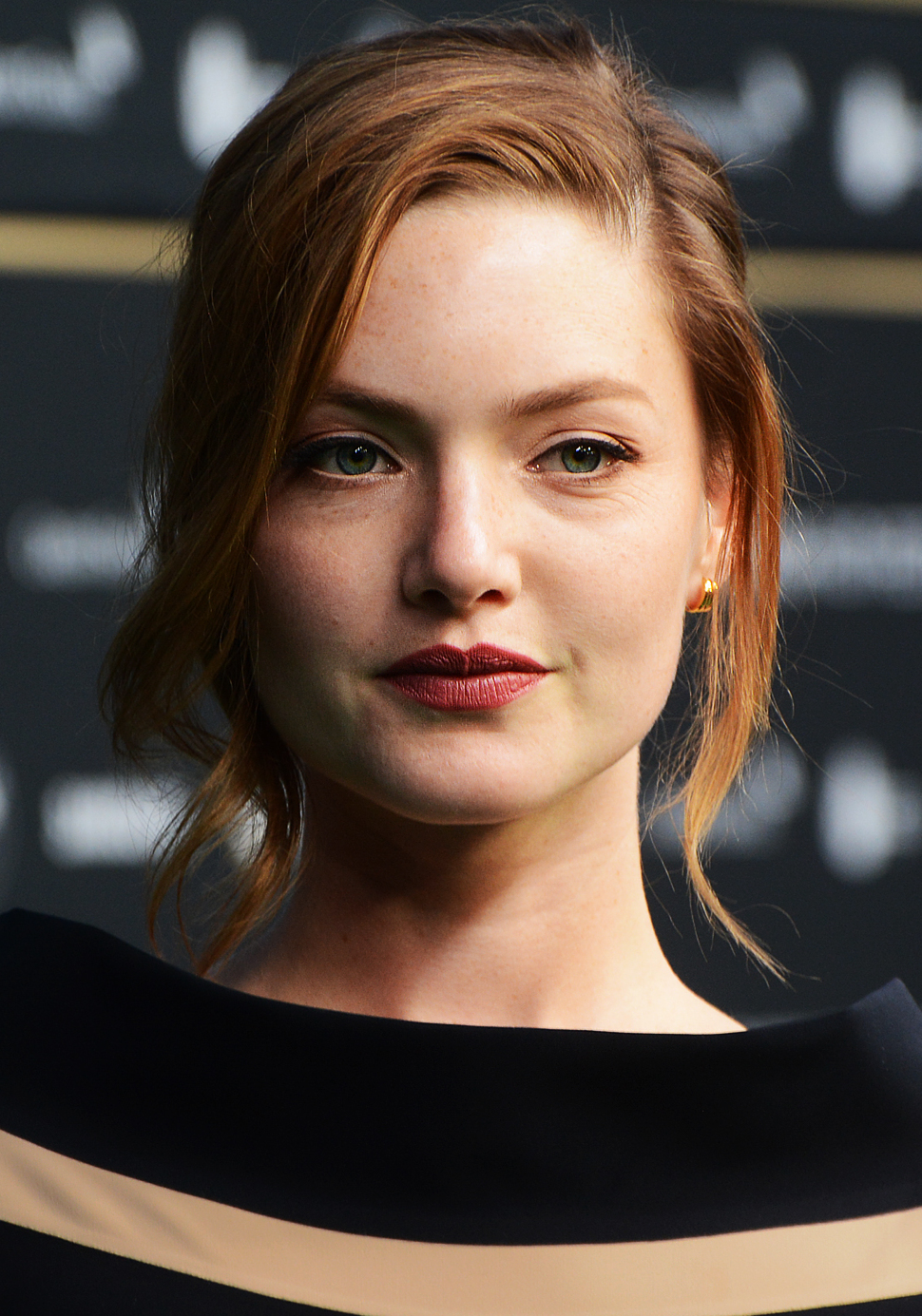
Top row: Cate Blanchett, Lily James, Richard Madden, and Helena Bonham Carter play Lady Tremaine, Ella, Kit, and Fairy Godmother.
Bottom row: Nonso Anozie, Stellan Skarsgård, Sophie McShera, and Holliday Grainger portray Captain, Grand Duke, Drisella and Anastasia Tremaine.

In November 2012, Deadline Hollywood reported that Cate Blanchett was in deep negotiations to play Lady Tremaine. She was the first actor to sign on for the project and, according to Shearmur, was always the only choice for the role. A few days later, Saoirse Ronan, Alicia Vikander, and Gabriella Wilde were reported to be in the running for the role of Cinderella, with Imogen Poots also being considered. By February 2013, Emma Watson entered negotiations for the title role, but a deal ultimately did not work out. Later, after she was cast as Belle in the 2017 live-action film adaptation of Beauty and the Beast (1991), directed by Bill Condon and starring alongside Dan Stevens, Watson elaborated that she refused because Cinderella's character did not resonate with her. By April 2013, Bella Heathcote, Lily James and Margot Robbie were testing for the title role, with James eventually cast later that month. She originally auditioned for the role of Anastasia, before the casting director suggested that she try out for Cinderella. In the following month, Richard Madden was cast as Prince Kit.

By June 2013, Holliday Grainger was set to play Anastasia, and a few days later, Sophie McShera, who had previously co-starred with James in the ITV television series Downton Abbey (2010–2015), was reported to be in talks for the role of Drisella. McShera's casting was confirmed later that month, while Helena Bonham Carter, who had previously worked with Branagh in Mary Shelley's Frankenstein (1994) and The Theory of Flight (1998), was cast as the Fairy Godmother. Like Blanchett, Bonham Carter was the first and only choice for her respective role. The following month, Stellan Skarsgård, who had previously worked with Branagh in Thor (2011), signed on to portray the Grand Duke, and Hayley Atwell landed the role of Cinderella's mother in August 2013. In September 2013, as the principal photography began, The Walt Disney Studios announced the casting of Branagh's frequent collaborator Derek Jacobi as the King and Nonso Anozie as the Captain.

=== Costumes ===
Three-time Oscar-winning costume designer Sandy Powell was in charge of the costumes for the film. Powell began working on concepts for the characters' looks almost two years before principal photography began in the summer of 2013. Powell said she was aiming for the look of "a nineteenth-century period film made in the 1940s or 1950s".

For the Fairy Godmother, Powell took a major departure from the animated film of the 1950s, instead giving actress Helena Bonham Carter an opulent white ballgown, featuring fairy wings, puff sleeves and a very full skirt. The skirt also had battery lights underneath it, which Carter said caused issues when filming scenes as the batteries would run low quite quickly.

For the stepmother and stepsisters, Powell had a very clear idea about the look; "They are meant to be totally ridiculous on the outside—a bit too much and overdone—and ugly on the inside". The silhouette of the prince came from the original animation, however she created a more fitted look and less masculine colours. Some of the prince costumes were dyed to accentuate Madden's eyes.

The ball gown was inspired by the Disney animated film in its color and shape: "The gown had to look lovely when she dances and runs away from the ball. I wanted her to look like she was floating, like a watercolour painting". The dress was made with more than a dozen fine layers of fabric, a corset and a petticoat. Eight versions of the Cinderella gown were designed, each with more than 270 yards of fabric and 10,000 crystals. It took 18 tailors and 500 hours to make each dress.

The wedding dress was another difficult project. "Creating the wedding dress was a challenge. Rather than try to make something even better than the ball gown, I had to do something completely different and simple... I wanted the whole effect to be ephemeral and fine, so we went with an extreme-lined shaped bodice with a long train", said Powell. It took 16 people and 550 hours to complete the silk-organza, hand-painted dress. While the crew photographed James in the gown, the actress stood too close to an electric heater and the dress caught on fire; the top layer of the dress had to be redone because only one wedding dress was created due to time and budget constraints.

For the glass slipper, Powell took inspiration from a 1950s shoe she saw in a museum. Since glass does not sparkle, they decided to use crystal instead. Swarovski partnered with Disney to make the famous shoe. Powell went directly to Swarovski headquarters in Austria to meet the product developers. It took six digital renderings of the shoes until they found the right one for the film. Swarovski made five life-size crystal shoes for the film, though none were actually wearable. Consequently, the leather shoes James wore on set had to be digitally altered into crystal. Alongside the slipper, Swarovski provided more than 1.7 million crystals that were used in costumes and 100 tiaras for the ball scene.

=== Filming ===
Principal photography on Cinderella began on September 23, 2013. The film was shot at Pinewood Studios in Buckinghamshire, England, and at various other locations including Hampton Court Palace, Blenheim Palace, Windsor Castle, Cliveden, Old Royal Naval College and Black Park. Although the royal palace is mainly computer-generated, it was modeled after the Zwinger in Dresden, Germany.

=== Post-production ===
Post-production began in December 2013, and was completed in August 2014. The finished film was rated PG for "mild thematic elements" by the Motion Picture Association of America. In the United Kingdom, the film received a U classification for "very mild scenes of emotional upset" by the British Board of Film Classification.

== Music ==
On June 7, 2013, news confirmed that composer Patrick Doyle would score the film, with the music having an emphasis on romance. Doyle has previously scored several Branagh films, including Hamlet and Thor. He has also scored the Disney·Pixar animated fantasy-comedy film Brave. Doyle recorded the film's score with the London Symphony Orchestra conducted by James Shearman at the Air Lyndhurst Studios in London.

The soundtrack debuted at No. 60 on the Billboard 200, selling 8,000 copies in its first week.

== Marketing ==
The first official presentation of the film occurred at Disney's three-day D23 Expo in August 2013. The film was previewed at CinemaCon in Las Vegas, Nevada, in March 2014, with a teaser showing Cinderella hearing about her father's death, meeting the prince while riding through the forest, her mother's ball gown being torn apart by her step-family and a comedic section where the Fairy Godmother transforms a pumpkin into a carriage.

The first official trailer debuted on May 15, 2014. In the minute-long teaser, which didn't include any footage from the film, a sparkling glass slipper is slowly revealed over a black background. The second official trailer – two-and-a-half minutes long and containing footage from the film – debuted on Good Morning America on November 19, 2014, with a 15-second trailer preview released two days prior. In its first 24 hours of release, the trailer was viewed 4.2 million times on YouTube and 33 million times on Facebook, the highest views among all Disney films in history, except for Marvel Studios releases. The movie's official poster was also released on November 19, featuring James as Cinderella and photographed by Annie Leibovitz. Disney released an international trailer on December 16, 2014. A new trailer was released on January 1, 2015. On February 11, 2015, Disney released a final trailer for the film.

=== Novelization ===
A tie-in novelization of the film written by Elizabeth Rudnick was published by Disney Publishing Worldwide on January 27, 2015.

== Release ==
=== Theatrical ===
The film had its world premiere on February 13, 2015, at the 65th Berlin International Film Festival, and was released on March 13, 2015. Theatrically, it was accompanied by Walt Disney Animation Studios' short film Frozen Fever, featuring the characters from Frozen. On February 10, 2015, IMAX Corporation and Disney announced plans to digitally re-master the film into the IMAX format and release it in IMAX theaters globally on the scheduled release date.

=== Home media ===
Walt Disney Studios Home Entertainment released Cinderella on Blu-ray combo pack, Digital HD, DVD, and "Disney Movies Anywhere" on September 15, 2015. Blu-ray bonus features include an alternate opening, the Frozen Fever short, and the featurettes: "Staging The Ball", "Ella's Furry Friends", "A Fairy Tale Comes to Life" and "Costume Test Fun". Five deleted scenes with an introduction by Kenneth Branagh are included exclusively on Disney Movies Anywhere. The film debuted in second place on the home media sales charts behind Furious 7. Cinderella was released on 4K Blu-ray on June 25, 2019.

In October 2014, a licensing agreement between Disney and Turner Broadcasting was announced, in which Cinderella would premiere across Turner's cable network portfolio (including TBS and TNT) in the Spring of 2017. The film had its network television premiere on TBS on August 13, 2017. The film also premiered on Disney Channel on August 14, 2018. The film aired on ABC's Wonderful World of Disney programming block on January 19, 2021.

== Reception ==
=== Box office ===
Cinderella grossed $201.2 million in the United States and Canada and $342.3 million in other territories, for a worldwide total of $543.5 million against a budget of $95 million. It was the twelfth-highest-grossing film of 2015. The film had a worldwide opening of $132 million, and an IMAX opening of $9 million. Deadline Hollywood calculated the film's net profit as $164.77 million, accounting for production budgets, marketing, talent participations, and other costs; box office grosses and home media revenues placed it eighth on their list of 2015's "Most Valuable Blockbusters".

In the U.S. and Canada, Cinderella opened on Friday, March 13, 2015, across 3,845 theaters, and earned $23 million. The film's Friday gross included a $2.3 million late night run. It topped the box office during its opening weekend as projected, earning $67.9 million, including a record $5 million from 358 IMAX theaters, and became Disney's biggest 2D PG-rated opening of all time. It is director Kenneth Branagh's biggest opening of his career (breaking 2011's Thor record), the fourth-highest Disney opening in March, and was the seventh-highest opening in March overall (not counting for inflation). Audiences during its opening weekend comprised 66% female, 66% families, 26% adults, 8% teenagers, 31% under the age of 12 and 9% 50 years and older. Cinderella finished its first week at the box office with $87.55 million, which was very high end of the film's lofty pre-release expectations. In its second weekend, the film declined 49% to $35 million and was surpassed by The Divergent Series: Insurgent, dropping to #2. The drop was in between two of Disney's previous live-action fantasy films, Oz the Great and Powerful (48%) and Maleficent (51%). In North America, Cinderella was the ninth-highest-grossing film of 2015.

Outside North America, box office analysts predicted as much as $60 million opening. The film made its debut outside of North America on the same weekend as its wide North American release and earned an estimated $62.4 million from 31 countries, including $4 million from IMAX theaters. It topped the box office for two non-consecutive weekends. It opened in China with $25 million, the biggest March opening in the country, and Russia with $7.3 million. The opening in these two countries were considered impressive given that both the countries are famous for their keenness for 3D films rather than 2D. Other high openings occurred in the UK, Ireland and Malta ($5.6 million), Mexico ($5 million), Japan ($4.8 million), France ($3.3 million), and Brazil ($3.7 million). In Australia, where the release date was coinciding with the Cricket World Cup finale, it managed to open with $3.4 million. Italy opened with $4.6 million and topped the box office for three consecutive weekends. It also topped the Japanese box office for five consecutive weekends. It became the second-highest grossing Disney live-action film in China, behind Pirates of the Caribbean: On Stranger Tides and in the Philippines, behind Maleficent. In total earnings, its largest markets outside of the US and Canada are China ($71.1 million), Japan ($46 million) and the UK, Ireland and Malta ($29.2 million).

=== Critical response ===
Cinderella received positive reviews from critics. Critics praised its performances and visual style, noting that it remained faithful to the original while introducing new elements. On the review aggregator website Rotten Tomatoes, the film holds an approval rating of 83% based on 258 reviews, with an average rating of 7.2/10. The website's critics consensus reads: "Refreshingly traditional in a revisionist era, Kenneth Branagh's Cinderella proves Disney hasn't lost any of its old-fashioned magic". Metacritic assigned the film a weighted average score of 67 out of 100, based on 47 critics, indicating "generally favorable" reviews. Audiences polled by CinemaScore gave the film a grade of "A" on an A+ to F scale.

David Rooney of The Hollywood Reporter reviewed the film at the Berlin Film Festival and praised the special effects, the screenplay and Blanchett's performance and said that "anyone nostalgic for childhood dreams of transformation will find something to enjoy in an uplifting movie that invests warm sentiment in universal themes of loss and resilience, experience and maturity". Peter Debruge of Variety said: "It's all a bit square, big on charm, but lacking the crackle of Enchanted or The Princess Bride. But though this Cinderella could never replace Disney's animated classic, it's no ugly stepsister either, but a deserving companion". Guy Lodge of The Guardian gave the film three stars out of five and said: "While it might have been nice to see the new-model Cinderella follow Frozen's progressive, quasi-feminist lead, the film's naff, preserved-in-amber romanticism is its very charm". Scott Mendelson of Forbes admired the film's visual effects and production design and deemed the costume design Oscar-worthy, adding: "With an emphasis on empathy and empowerment, Walt Disney's Cinderella is the best film yet in their 'turn our animated classics into live-action blockbuster' subgenre".

Richard Corliss of Time magazine said that Branagh's Cinderella successfully updated and revitalized Disney's "ill-conceived" animated film, and praised the empowered Ella, the visuals and Blanchett's performance. Katy Waldman of Slate similarly deemed the film a commendable and authentic upgrade that does not undermine its heroine while maintaining its classic splendor and charm. Joe Morgenstern of The Wall Street Journal commended James' and Blanchett's performances, the sets, costumes and minimal digital effects, as well as Branagh's direction, stating that he "set a tone of lushly sustainable fantasy that's often affecting, frequently witty, seldom cloying, nearly free of self-comment and entirely free of irony". Likewise, Claudia Puig of USA Today complimented the performances along with Branagh and screenwriter Chris Weitz for "ground[ing] this romantic tale with sincerity amid the dazzle". Betsy Sharkey of the Los Angeles Times praised Blanchett's and James' performances and described the film as a "poetically, if not prophetically, imagined storybook fable" that succeeds because of its earnestness, humor, its lack of modern-day pretenses, and Branagh's "singular focus". Lawrence Toppman of The Charlotte Observer proclaimed: "This version has more psychological depth than usual and answers questions we may always have had. Branagh's Cinderella does something extraordinarily rare among fairy-tale adaptations: It leaves out nothing we want and adds nothing we don't". Noting the religious themes and symbols of the film, cultural commentator Fr. Robert Barron wrote that, due to Branagh's traditional telling of the story, "he actually allows the spiritual – indeed specifically Christian – character of the tale to emerge".

The film was ranked #1 on TheWrap's list of "Every Disney Live-Action Remake of an Animated Classic Ranked, Worst to Best", #2 in Variety's list of "Disney's Live-Action Remakes Ranked From 101 Dalmatians to Mulan", #3 on the Rotten Tomatoes list of "All 14 Disney Live-Action Remakes Ranked", and #1 on Polygon's "All 20 Disney live-action remake movies, ranked."

Following the release of the live action version of Snow White and the Seven Dwarfs to commercial disappointment ten years after the film was released, some stated that the film set the standard for Disney live-action remakes due to its strong storytelling and character development, visual spectacle and production design (which includes the limited use of computer generated imagery), exceptional casting, being more than just a remake, director Kenneth Branagh's approach of blending classical and commercial filmmaking, genre-hopping and focusing on actor performances; others stated that it is the only live-action adaptation made by Disney that worked.

=== Accolades ===
Award	Date of ceremony	Category	Recipient(s)	Result	Ref.
Teen Choice Awards	August 16, 2015	Choice Movie: Sci-Fi/Fantasy	Cinderella	Nominated	
Teen Choice Awards	August 16, 2015	Choice Movie Actress: Sci-Fi/Fantasy	Lily James	Nominated	
World Soundtrack Awards	October 24, 2015	Best Original Score of the Year	Patrick Doyle	Nominated	
Hollywood Film Awards	November 1, 2015	Costume Design Award	Sandy Powell	Won	
Hollywood Music in Media Awards	November 11, 2015	Best Original Score – Fantasy Film	Patrick Doyle	Nominated	
Washington D.C. Area Film Critics Association Awards	December 7, 2015	Best Art Direction	Dante Ferretti and Francesca Lo Schiavo	Nominated	
St. Louis Gateway Film Critics Association	December 21, 2015	Best Art Direction	Dante Ferretti	Nominated	
Capri Hollywood Film Festival Awards	January 2, 2016	Best Costume	Sandy Powell	Won	
People's Choice Awards	January 2, 2016	Favorite Family Movie	Cinderella	Nominated	
Critics' Choice Awards	January 17, 2016	Best Costume Design	Sandy Powell	Nominated	
London Film Critics' Circle	January 17, 2016	Technical Achievement	Sandy Powell (costumes)	Nominated	
Art Directors Guild	January 31, 2016	Excellence in Production Design for a Fantasy Film	Dante Ferretti	Nominated	
British Academy Film Awards	February 14, 2016	Costume Design	Sandy Powell	Nominated	
Make-Up Artists and Hair Stylists Guild Awards	February 20, 2016	Feature Motion Picture: Best Period and/or Character Hair Styling	Carol Hemming, Orla Carroll, and Wakana Yoshihara	Won	
Make-Up Artists and Hair Stylists Guild Awards	February 20, 2016	Feature Motion Picture: Best Period and/or Character Makeup	Naomi Dunne and Norma Webb	Nominated	
Satellite Awards	February 21, 2016	Best Art Direction and Production Design	Dante Ferretti	Nominated	
Satellite Awards	February 21, 2016	Best Costume Design	Sandy Powell	Nominated	
Costume Designers Guild Awards	February 23, 2016	Excellence in Fantasy Film	Sandy Powell	Nominated	
Academy Awards	February 28, 2016	Best Costume Design	Sandy Powell	Nominated	
Kids' Choice Awards	March 12, 2016	Favorite Movie	Cinderella	Nominated	
Kids' Choice Awards	March 12, 2016	Favorite Movie Actress	Lily James	Nominated	
Empire Awards	March 20, 2016	Best Costume Design	Sandy Powell	Nominated	
Golden Trailer Awards	May 4, 2016	Best Animation/Family Trailer	Cinderella	Nominated	
Saturn Awards	June 22, 2016	Best Fantasy Film	Cinderella	Won	
Saturn Awards	June 22, 2016	Best Costume Design	Sandy Powell	Nominated	

== Bibliography ==
- Solomon, Charles (2015). A Wish Your Heart Makes: From the Grimm Brothers' Aschenputtel to Disney's Cinderella. Disney Editions. ISBN 978-1-4847-1326-6.
