= Douglas Hodge =

British actor (born 1960)

- Born: Douglas William Hodge; 25 February 1960 (age 66); Plymouth, Devon, England
- Education: Royal Academy of Dramatic Art
- Occupations: Actor; director; musician
- Years active: 1985–present
- Spouse: Amanda Miller
- Partner: Tessa Peake-Jones (1984–2013)
- Children: 2

Douglas William Hodge (born 25 February 1960) is an English actor, director and musician. He has had an extensive career in theatre, as well as film and television where he has appeared in Robin Hood (2010), Legends of Oz: Dorothy's Return and Diana (both 2013), Penny Dreadful (2016), Catastrophe (2018), Joker and Lost in Space (both 2019), and The Great (2020–2023).

== Early life and education ==
Douglas William Hodge was born on 25 February 1960 in Plymouth, Devon. When he was young, his family moved to Wigmore, Gillingham, Kent.

He attended Fairview Primary School and The Howard School in Rainham, Kent. He was awarded a position as student at the Royal Academy of Dramatic Art (RADA), in London, but was not happy and left before graduating. This never affected his desire to be an actor.

== Career ==
=== Theatre ===
Hodge has acted in plays by Harold Pinter, including No Man's Land at the Comedy Theatre in February 1993; Moonlight at the Almeida Theatre in September 1993; A Kind of Alaska,The Lover; The Collection at the Donmar Warehouse in May 1998; as Jerry in Betrayal at the Royal National Theatre's Lyttelton Theatre, in November 1998; and as Aston in The Caretaker at the Comedy Theatre in November 2000, co-starring Michael Gambon (Davies) and Rupert Graves (Mick), directed by Patrick Marber – for which he was nominated for an Olivier Award for Best Actor in a Supporting Role. For the National Theatre in May 1994 Hodge played the title role in Phyllida Lloyd's Olivier Theatre staging of Shakespeare's Pericles and Al in Stephen Poliakoff's Blinded by the Sun directed by Ron Daniels at the Cottesloe Theatre in May 1997.

In 2002, Hodge played Leontes in an RSC revival of The Winter's Tale at the Roundhouse. In April 2003 he portrayed Andrei in Michael Blakemore's revival of Chekhov's Three Sisters at the Playhouse Theatre. In 2004, he made his Royal Court debut as Barry in Joe Penhall's study of entrapment journalism Dumb Show, directed by Terry Johnson. Hodge's directorial debut came in 2004, at the Oxford Playhouse in a double bill of The Dumb Waiter and Other Pieces. Hodge appeared in the 2005 revival of Guys and Dolls at the Piccadilly Theatre playing Nathan Detroit opposite Ewan McGregor playing Sky Masterson. He received an Olivier Award nomination for his performance.

During the summer of 2006, he acted the title role in Titus Andronicus, at Shakespeare's Globe. Simultaneously, he made his West End directorial debut with See How They Run, a 1940s wartime farce by Philip King, preceded by a UK tour. When his production opened in the West End, Nancy Carroll took over from Hattie Morahan in the role of the vicar's young wife. In May 2007 he displayed a lyric tenor voice as Frank, the neurosurgeon in A Matter of Life and Death with the Kneehigh Theatre company at the National Theatre, a production with music, based on events in the film of the same name. Also in 2007 he guest starred in the Doctor Who audio dramas Urban Myths and Son of the Dragon. In 2008, Hodge starred as Albin in the London revival of La Cage aux Folles which played originally at the Menier Chocolate Factory. He later reprised this role at the Playhouse Theatre in the West End and won the 2009 Olivier Award for Best Actor in a Musical.

In 2010, The London production of La Cage aux Folles transferred to Broadway, at the Longacre Theatre, with Hodge as Albin, and Kelsey Grammer as Georges. Hodge won the 2010 Tony Award for Best Performance by a Leading Actor in a Musical for his performance. A 2011 revival of John Osborne's Inadmissible Evidence at the Donmar Theatre, London, offered Hodge another role, as Maitland, the lawyer in crisis. Hodge received an Olivier Award nomination for his performance. In 2012, Hodge returned to Broadway when he starred as Cyrano de Bergerac in the Roundabout Theatre Company's revival of Cyrano de Bergerac at the American Airlines Theatre. In October 2012, Hodge was cast as Willy Wonka in the musical Charlie and the Chocolate Factory the Musical at the Theatre Royal, Drury Lane London.

In 2015, Hodge made his debut as a Broadway director, helming a revival of Pinter's 1971 play Old Times, which starred Clive Owen, Eve Best and Kelly Reilly, and opened at the American Airlines Theatre.

==== Writing ====
Hodge wrote a musical with Aschlin Ditta, temporarily called Meantime. Josefina Gabrielle, Denis Lawson and several others participated in a cast recording, and actors including Rory Kinnear, Indira Varma and Cillian Murphy participated in a reading of the book.

He wrote the music and lyrics for the musical 101 Dalmatians, based on the novel by Dodie Smith with a book by Johnny McKnight (from a stage adaptation by Zinnie Harris) at the Regent's Park Open Air Theatre. The musical was due to open in May 2020, however was postponed to July 2022 due to the COVID-19 pandemic.

==== Directing ====
Hodge has parallel careers as a writer, director and composer, most recently directing Torch Song Trilogy at the Menier Chocolate Factory in 2012. He was associate director at the Donmar Theatre directing Dimetos in 2009, Absurdia in 2007.

He directed the world premiere of Last Easter by Bryony Lavery at Birmingham Repertory Theatre, and See How They Run.

He also directed the Millennium Dome Show in the year 2000.

==== Awards ====
Hodge has received Olivier Award nominations for Best Actor for Inadmissible Evidence in 2012 and Best Actor in a Musical for Guys and Dolls in 2006, winning Best Actor in a Musical for La Cage aux Folles in 2010. He was also nominated for Best Actor in the 2005 Evening Standard Awards for his role in Dumbshow at the Royal Court.

Hodge starred as Albin in the Broadway transfer of La Cage aux Folles, for which his performance won him a Tony Award for Best Actor in a Musical, a Drama Desk Award for Outstanding Actor in a Musical, and an Outer Critics Circle Award for Outstanding Actor in a Musical. He originally played the role in London in 2008 at the Menier Chocolate Factory and then at the Playhouse Theatre in the West End.

=== Television ===
With Peter Searles, Hodge co-wrote Pacha Mama's Blessing and Forest People, about the Amazon rainforest, performed by the National Youth Theatre on BBC Television in 1989. He appeared in the BBC's production Middlemarch, adapted by Andrew Davies from the novel by George Eliot and directed by Anthony Page. In the US it aired on Masterpiece Theatre in 1994.

His other TV appearances include leading roles in Behaving Badly (1989); Capital City (1989–1990); A Fatal Inversion (1992); Bliss (1995); Only Fools and Horses (1996) The Uninvited (1997); The Scold's Bridle (1998); Shockers: Dance (1999); The Law (2000); the BBC serial adaptation of Trollope's The Way We Live Now (2001), as Roger Carbury; The Russian Bride (2001); Red Cap (2003–2004); Spooks (2005); ITV's 2007 adaptation of Mansfield Park, as Sir Thomas Bertram; and the made-for-TV film Lift, directed by James Hawes, a 2007 Hartswood Films production for BBC Four, as Paul Sykes, "a constantly exasperated, highly-strung middle-aged businessman with commitments.".

In 2010, he appeared in the episode "The Restaurant" of the third series of the BBC sitcom Outnumbered as Brick Bolenger, an American therapist who is married to Auntie Angela (played by Samantha Bond). The character was involved in a story line of the fourth series in 2011, but never appeared on screen. In 2012, Hodge had a role in the BBC drama One Night, as well as appearing in the conspiracy thriller miniseries Secret State, and the ITV-1 drama The Town.

In 2016, he featured as Rex Mayhew in the BBC adaptation of John le Carré's The Night Manager. In 2017, he appeared in "Black Museum", an episode of the anthology series Black Mirror. He appeared as Inspector Bartholomew Rusk in the series Penny Dreadful. He played Grimes in a BBC adaptation of Evelyn Waugh's Decline and Fall, alongside Jack Whitehall, Stephen Graham and David Suchet.

From 2020 to 2023, Hodge played the role of General Velementov, head of Catherine the Great's armies in The Great, alongside Elle Fanning and Nicholas Hoult.

=== Music ===
Doug Hodge released two albums of his own compositions: "Cowley Road Songs" in 2005, and "Nightbus" in 2009. He won the Stiles and Drewe 2012 Best New Song Award for his song 'Powercut' from "Meantime", the musical he co-wrote with Aschlin Ditta.

"I've been writing songs all my life but — apart from the occasional girlfriend late at night — I'd never sung them to anyone. Then last year I finally started playing at various venues in and around Oxford. Each time I wrote a new song I'd go down the Ex [on Cowley Road] and sing it... Then Rightback Records asked me to record them. We went into the Blue Moon Studios in Banbury for just four days. This [Cowley Road Songs] is what we came out with..." – Douglas Hodge

== Personal life ==
Until 2013, Hodge was in a relationship with actress Tessa Peake-Jones with whom he has two children. He subsequently married American wigmaker Amanda Miller.

== Filmography ==
=== Film ===
Year	Title	Role	Notes
1988	Salome's Last Dance	John the Baptist / Lord Alfred "Bosey" Douglas	
1989	Dealers	Patrick Skill	
1989	Diamond Skulls	Jamie Skinner	
1991	Buddy's Song	Bobby Rosen	
1993	The Trial	Inspector	
1996	Hollow Reed	Hannah's barrister	
2000	The Magic of Vincent	Dr. Robert Blake	Short film
2004	Vanity Fair	Pitt Crawley	
2004	Out of Time	Michael	Short film
2006	Scenes of a Sexual Nature	Brian	
2009	The Descent Part 2	Dan	
2010	Robin Hood	Sir Robert Loxley	
2012	Bert & Dickie	John Bushnell	
2013	Legends of Oz: Dorothy's Return	Fruit Striped Lawyer	Voice
2013	Diana	Paul Burrell	
2014	Serena	Horace Kephart	
2016	The Complete Walk: The Tempest	Prospero	Short film
2016	The Dancer	Taylor	
2017	Tulip Fever	Nicholas Steen	
2018	Beirut	Sully	
2018	Red Sparrow	Maxim Volontov	
2018	Wanderland	Dr. Rock Positano	
2018	Jonathan	Hans	
2019	The Report	Dr. James Mitchell	
2019	Joker	Alfred Pennyworth	
2019	Gemini Man	Jack Willis	
2020	The Devil All the Time	Tater Brown	
2022	The Curse of Bridge Hollow	Old Man	
2022	A Grand Romantic Gesture	Simon	
2024	We Live in Time	Reginald	
2025	G20	Oliver Everett	
2025	Pillion	Pete	
2026	Jack Ryan: Ghost War	Nigel Cooke	
TBA	Vindication Swim	TBA	Post-production
TBA	(Saint) Peter	Coach Phillips	Post-production

=== Television ===
Year	Title	Role	Notes
1985	Alas Smith and Jones	Unknown	Episode #2.1
1986	Sorry!	Geoffrey	Episode: "Every Clown Wants to Play Hamlet"
1988	Me and My Girl	Tarzan	Episode: "Question Time"
1988	Ten Great Writers of the Modern World	Stage Manager / Son / Ordolfo / Raskolnikov	2 episodes
1988	London's Burning	Bobby	Episode #1.5
1988	King and Castle	Detective Sergeant	Episode: "Cons"
1988	Rumpole of the Bailey	Nigel Timson	Episode: "Rumpole and the Barrow Boy"
1989	Behaving Badly	Giles	
1989–1990	Capital City	Declan McConnochie	
1992	A Fatal Inversion	Adam	3 episodes
1992	Anglo-Saxon Attitudes	Young Gerald Middleton	3 episodes
1994	Middlemarch	Dr. Tertius Lydgate	
1994	Broken Lives	Unknown	TV film
1994	Open Fire	DC Peter Finch	TV film
1994–1995	Screen Two	Michael Cooper / Leslie Bliss / Tracey	3 episodes
1995	It Could Be You	Bob	TV film
1996	True Love	James	TV film
1996	Only Fools and Horses	Adult Damien	Episode: "Heroes and Villains"
1997	The Uninvited	Steve Blake	
1997	Rules of Engagement	Moorhead	TV film
1998	The Scold's Bridle	Jack Blankeney	2 episodes
1999	Shockers: Dance	Mike Swift	TV film
2000	The Law	DI Jack Raleigh	TV film
2000	The Canterbury Tales	Unknown	Episode: "The Journey Back"; Voice role
2001	The Way We Live Now	Roger Carbury	
2001	The Russian Bride	Eddie Brennan	TV film
2001, 2003–2004	Red Cap	Sgt. Maj. Kenneth Burns	
2002	Blue Heelers	Ray Barry	Episode: "Private Lives"
2005	Spooks	Gary Hicks	Episode #4.5
2007	The Lift	Paul Sykes	TV film
2007	Mansfield Park	Sir Thomas Bertram	TV film
2007	The Whistleblowers	DI Bell	Episode: "Ghosts"
2009	Unforgiven	Michael Belcombe	3 episodes
2010	Arena	Various characters	Episode: "Harold Pinter: A Celebration"
2010	Skins	Edward Jones	Episode: "JJ"
2010	Outnumbered	Brick	Episode: "The Restaurant"
2012	One Night	Ted	
2012	Secret State	Anthony Fossett	3 episodes
2012	The Town	Inspector Chris Franks	
2015–2016	Penny Dreadful	Bartholomew Rusk	13 episodes
2016	The Good Wife	Damon Stryk	Episode: "Tracks"
2016, 2026	The Night Manager	Rex Mayhew	6 episodes
2016	Falling Water	H. Robert Arnot, CEO White Sand Equity	5 episodes
2017	Death in Paradise	Daniel Langham	Episode: "Errupting in Murder"
2017	Unforgotten	Paul Nixon	4 episodes
2017	Decline and Fall	Grimes	
2017	Maigret in Montmartre	Fred Alfonsi	TV film
2017	Black Mirror	Rolo Haynes	Episode: "Black Museum"
2017–2019	Catastrophe	Douglas	7 episodes
2018	Elementary	Sydney Place	Episode: "Our Time Is Up"
2018	Watergate	Richard Nixon	
2019	Curfew	Tom Weston	Episode #1.4
2019–2021	Lost in Space	Alistair Hastings	6 episodes
2020	The Undoing	Robert Adelman	2 episodes
2020–2023	The Great	General Velementov	
2022	I Hate Suzie Too	Bailey Quinn	Episode #2.1
2023	Extrapolations	Hendricks	1 episode
2025	The Bombing of Pan Am 103	DCS Stuart Henderson	1 episode
2026	Legends	Blake	Main cast; 6 episodes
2026	Youth	Malcolm Hammond	3 episodes

== Awards and nominations ==
Year	Award	Category	Work	Result	Reference
2001	Laurence Olivier Award	Best Actor in a Supporting Role	The Caretaker	Nominated	
2006	Laurence Olivier Award	Best Actor in a Musical	Guys and Dolls	Nominated	
2009	Laurence Olivier Award	Best Actor in a Musical	La Cage aux Folles	Won	
2010	Tony Award	Best Performance by a Leading Actor in a Musical	La Cage aux Folles	Won	
2010	Drama Desk Award	Outstanding Actor in a Musical	La Cage aux Folles	Won	
2010	Outer Critics Circle Award	Outstanding Actor in a Musical	La Cage aux Folles	Won	
2012	Laurence Olivier Award	Best Actor	Inadmissible Evidence	Nominated	
2014	Whatsonstage.com Awards	Best Actor in a Musical	Charlie and the Chocolate Factory	Nominated	
2014	Laurence Olivier Award	Best Actor in a Musical	Charlie and the Chocolate Factory	Nominated	
2021	Screen Actors Guild Awards	Outstanding Performance by an Ensemble in a Comedy Series	The Great	Nominated	
