= Jana Pérez =

Spanish actress

- Born: 23 September 1986 (age 39); Barcelona, Spain
- Occupations: Actress, model
- Known for: Cinderella

Jana Pérez (born 23 September 1986) is a Spanish actress and model.

== Early life ==
Raised in the neighborhood of Horta, Barcelona, she made her debut as an advertising model at the age of 6. At that same age, she met her father (who is from Ceuta).

Her grandfather was a boxing champion in Spain.

== Career ==
In 2013 she starred in the global campaign The House of Häagen-Dazs, alongside actor Bradley Cooper.

== Filmography ==
- 2013: Love Matters (as Matilda)
- 2015: Cinderella (as Princess Chelina of Zaragoza)
- 2016: Our Kind of Traitor (as Maria)
- 2018: Fariña (as Camila Reyes)
- 2018: Holmes & Watson (as Lestrade's wife)
- 2021: The One (as Sophia Rodriguez)
- 2023: Fairgame [short] (as Lorena)
