= Daniel Parker (make-up artist) =

English make-up artist

- Occupation: Make-up artist

Daniel Parker is an English make-up artist. He was nominated for an Academy Award in the category Best Makeup and Hairstyling for the film Mary Shelley's Frankenstein.

== Selected filmography ==
- Mary Shelley's Frankenstein (1994; co-nominated with Paul Engelen and Carol Hemming)
