= Empire State (1987 film) =

1987 British gang warfare film by Ron Peck

- Theatrical release poster
- Directed by: Ron Peck
- Screenplay by: Mark Ayres, Ron Peck
- Produced by: Mark Ayres; Norma Heyman; Glen Murphy
- Starring: Cathryn Harrison; Jason Hoganson; Glen Murphy; Martin Landau; Jamie Foreman; Emily Bolton
- Cinematography: Tony Imi
- Edited by: Chris Kelly
- Distributed by: Virgin Films
- Release date: 1987
- Running time: 103 minuets
- Country: United Kingdom
- Language: English

Empire State is a 1987 British film about gang warfare over American investment in the East End of London, directed by Ron Peck.

== Synopsis ==
In the late eighties, investment and redevelopment of the East End of London is well underway. Empire State, a sumptuous nightclub, attracts crowds. However, under the control of gangland boss Frank Wright (Ray McAnally) it is also a cover for gangland violence and drug dealing. As new investment capital flows into the city, a gangland turf war is underway, with the area's older generation of gangsters, led by Frank, being challenged by ambitious upstarts like Paul (Ian Sears). When an American called Chuck (Martin Landau) arrives in the city intending to invest a substantial amount of capital in the Docklands redevelopment, everyone becomes interested. Caught in the midst of this turmoil are receptionists Marion and Tricia, out for a night on the town; call girl Susan and her increasingly insane lover Danny, drifter Pete, rent boy Johnny, and boxers intent on proving themselves in illegal bare-fist combat at the club. Journalist Richard delves into the internal workings of the club, trying to find out details about Empire State and the criminal activity that occurs there. After the climactic bare-knuckle boxing competition, Danny finds Marion at the night club with her night's companion, and opens fire on the club's entrance.

== Cast ==
- Cathryn Harrison – Marion
- Jason Hoganson – Pete
- Glen Murphy – Vincenzo
- Jamie Foreman – Danny
- Emily Bolton – Susan
- Ian Sears – Paul
- Martin Landau – Chuck
- Lorcan Cranitch – Richard
- Ray McAnally – Frank
- Lee Drysdale – Johnny
- Jenny Bolt – Tricia
- Jimmy Flint – Billy
- John Levitt – Harry
- Ian McCurrach – 'Metropolis' editor
- Elizabeth Hickling – Cheryl
- Perry Fenwick – Darren
- Michelle Collins – Emma

== Response ==
The film was criticised at the time for its uneven pacing, rudimentary characterisation and acting skills of many of its cast. However, after the redevelopment of the Docklands area in the late eighties and early nineties, which had only begun when Empire State was filmed, architectural students have noted the contrast between the transitional status of derelict buildings and the imminent arrival of capital in the area to construct new apartments and corporate premises.
