= Capital City (TV series) =

British television series

- Genre: Drama
- Starring: William Armstrong; John Bowe; Denys Hawthorne; Dorian Healy; Douglas Hodge; Jason Isaacs; Joanna Kanska; Richard LeParmentier; Trevyn McDowell; Anna Nygh; Joanna Phillips-Lane; Rolf Saxon; Emily Bolton; Saira Todd
- Country of origin: United Kingdom
- Original language: English
- No. of series: 2
- No. of episodes: 23

Production
- Running time: 50 minutes
- Production company: Euston Films for Thames Television

Original release
- Network: ITV
- Release: 26 September 1989 – 20 December 1990

Capital City is a television series which focused on the professional and personal lives of a group of investment bankers working in the dealing room at Shane Longman, a fictional international bank based in the City of London. The 23-episode series was produced by Euston Films, a wholly owned subsidiary of Thames Television, for the ITV network and that aired from 26 September 1989 to 20 December 1990.

Thames Television spent an estimated £500,000 to run newspaper and billboard advertisements to promote the series' launch which at the time was believed to be the largest advertising spend for a programme in the history of ITV. Full-page advertisements were taken in six national newspapers including The Financial Times, The Times and The Independent. The ads promoted the Shane Longman "brand", rather than "Capital City", and featured images of cast members in character.

Thames Television stated that the press and poster ads were considered necessary to raise the profile of the series amongst members of the public who had a specialised or more professional interest, however a number of City bankers described the series as "fairly inaccurate", "confusing for the ordinary viewer", and lacking solid research. One television critic stated: "All of this would have been quite novel and exciting three years ago, but the world has turned, the market has crashed and we have all seen enough of other people's Porsches to last a lifetime... City hustlers do not look very heroic any more, just extravagantly paid."

Still, it could be argued that most of the characters in "Capital City" – perhaps with the exception of the reckless and predatory Jimmy Destry, power-hungry Lee Wolf and the duplicitous Sylvia Roux Teng – portray City bankers in a generally positive manner. The primary characters come across as likeable and – in contrast to the Gordon Gekko "greed is good" stereotype often associated with their industry – as possessing a moral and/or social conscience; in one episode, the entire dealing room threatens to go on strike in protest against handling a bond issue on behalf of a company which dumps toxic waste in poor African countries and demand that Shane Longman introduce policies which enable them to avoid dealing with clients whom they regard as unethical.

Capital City is very much a product of the late 1980s, on the cusp of the digital revolution. The dealing room computers use what appeared to be a MS-DOS; mobile phones are the size of bricks; the primary methods of long-distance "instant" communication are still the land line telephone, fax and telex; and smoking – banned in England, within most public buildings, in 2007 – is still allowed in the workplace as well as inside restaurants, bars and other public places. At the same time, the series dealt with several mature storylines including alcoholism, depression, mental illness, sexual assault, drug use, homosexuality, physical assault, gambling addiction, prostitution, promiscuity, shoplifting, fraud, bribery, corruption and abortion.

== Cast ==
The main cast (in alphabetical order as shown in the series credits) included:

- William Armstrong as Max Lubin
- Emily Bolton as Sylvia Roux Teng (from episode 13)
- John Bowe as Leonard Ansen
- Denys Hawthorne as James Farrell
- Dorian Healy as Jimmy Destry (to episode 13)
- Douglas Hodge as Declan McConnachie
- Jason Isaacs as Chas Ewell
- Joanna Kanska as Sirkka Nieminen
- Richard LeParmentier as Lee Wolf
- Trevyn McDowell as Michelle Hauptmann
- Anna Nygh as Hannah Burgess
- Joanna Phillips-Lane as Wendy Foley (to episode 14)
- Rolf Saxon as Hudson J. Talbot III
- Saira Todd as Hilary Rollinger (from episode 15)
- Briony Glassco as Gail Martin

Recurring support and guest cast included Mark Burns as Peter Longman, grandson of the bank's founder, the eponymous Shane Longman, and 30 per cent shareholder; Louise Lombard who appeared as Louise, a 17-year-old runaway who is befriended by Chas and is later assaulted by Jimmy; Faith Brook as Katherine Talbot, Hudson's mother; Charlotte Cornwell as Petra Allunson; Julia Ormond as Allison; Ben Daniels as Colin de Selincourt; and Pia Henderson, as Yolande, with whom Sirkka has a brief relationship.

== Characters ==
- Max Lubin (William Armstrong), the bank's unconventional and somewhat eccentric, pony tail-wearing Head of Swaps
- Sylvia Roux Teng (Emily Bolton), replaces Wendy Foley as the bank's Chief Trader in episode 13; Sylvia's duplicitous nature is revealed when she mentions to City headhunter and personal friend, Petra Allunson, that the core members of the dealing room team – Declan McConnochie, Michelle Hauptmann, Sirkka Nieminen, Chas Ewell and their assistants – are unhappy and potentially "on the market"
- Leonard Ansen (John Bowe), the Director of Banking Activities, who constantly clashes with the power-hungry Lee Wolf who regards the bank's dealers as reckless risk-takers; becomes romantically involved with Hannah Burgess after her marriage breaks down
- James Farrell (Denys Hawthorne), the bank's Chief Executive Officer
- Jimmy Destry (Dorian Healy), a maverick junior trader, nicknamed 'Squirt' by Declan McConnochie, who is sacked for malpractice in episode 13; Destry shares a flat with Chas Ewell but the two fall out after Destry molests Louise, a 17-year-old runaway who Chas befriends at a railway station, in episode 4
- Declan McConnachie (Douglas Hodge), a senior trader on the secondary desk; becomes romantically involved with Michelle Hauptmann, who he marries in the final episode
- Chas Ewell (Jason Isaacs), a junior trader on the primary desk, who questions his role in the city during a personal crisis in series one
- Sirkka Nieminen (Joanna Kanska), a senior trader in the secondary desk; the character is originally from Finland (though the actress is Polish) and experiences numerous personal crises during the series including a battle with alcoholism, an abortion and a lesbian affair; she is a serial risk-taker and thrill-seeker who, during episode 11, represents herself as a high-class prostitute on at least two occasions; during the series it is revealed that Sirkka and Declan McConnochie were romantically involved at one stage in the past
- Lee Wolf (Richard LeParmentier), the Director of Corporate Finance, who constantly clashes with Leonard Ansen over the role of the banks dealers, who Wolf regards as reckless risk-takers
- Michelle Hauptmann (Trevyn McDowell), a 24-year-old senior trader on the primary desk; she is originally from Germany and becomes romantically involved with Declan McConnachie during series one; the two marry in the final episode at the end of series two
- Hannah Burgess (Anna Nygh), responsible for overseeing the dealing room IT and computer systems; Australian-born; she becomes romantically involved with Leonard Ansen after she and her husband Ryan divorce
- Wendy Foley (Joanna Phillips-Lane), initially the Chief Trader, Wendy is promoted to become the new Head of Derivatives in episode 13 and is replaced on the dealing room floor by Sylvia Roux Teng; she resigns from the bank in episode 14 to work with major shareholder Peter Longman
- Hudson J. Talbot III (Rolf Saxon), a US-born attorney and the bank's capital markets originator whose mentally unwell wife Alex leaves him and their infant son in episode 1
- Hilary Rollinger (Saira Todd), a 22-year-old graduate who excelled in economics and philosophy; joins Shane Longman in episode 15 to assist Michelle Hauptmann on the primary desk; during the office party celebrating the impending nuptials of Michelle and Declan, a very tipsy Hilary manages to tell Declan what a sweet and sexy guy he is, much to everyone's amusement as they look on from the table

== Episodes ==
=== Series 1 (1989) ===
No. overall	No. in series	Title	Directed by	Written by	Original release date	Duration
1	1	"Second Quarter Figures"	Paul Seed	Andrew Maclear	26 September 1989	50 minutes
It's Monday morning on the trading floor of Shane Longman, a London-based international bank. The market has been erratic, nobody is getting it right and with the US trade figure due, the dealers are under pressure to improve on last month's performance. Several members of the board are critical of the 'maverick' image of the trading floor. Heads may roll. Meanwhile, Hudson's mentally unwell wife abandons him and their infant son, and Chas Ewell befriends Louise, a 17-year-old runaway.
2	2	"Insider Trading"	Sarah Hellings	Andrew Maclear	3 October 1989	50 minutes
A serious problem looms at Shane Longman. Leonard Ansen, the Senior Director of Banking Activities, and Wendy's closest ally on the top floor, is in trouble with the DTI. He is suspected of insider trading and is forced to inform the board of his situation. Lee Wolf, the Director of Corporate Finance, and Ralph Goldring, the Director of Finance, demand Leonard's resignation; however, when CEO James Farrell and major shareholder Peter Longman put their support behind Leonard, it is Ralph Goldring who is forced out.
3	3	"Thanksgiving"	Paul Seed	Andrew Maclear	10 October 1989	50 minutes
It's Friday evening. The market is winding down. Sirkka is flying to Copenhagen for the weekend to see her boyfriend, Sven, and is about to leave when she hears that Aristotle has dropped out of an important deal she has set up. She must find another player fast as the deal has to be in place by Monday morning. Sirkka confronts Aristotle in a nearby bar and ends up with a black eye.
4	4	"Max in Trouble"	Mike Vardy	Matthew Bardsley	17 October 1989	50 minutes
Declan is having a dinner party for Max, Michelle and Sophie – an art dealer who likes Max and whom Max, for his part, seems to like as well until he discovers she used to use drugs and, he feels, might start using again. Max, though, seems far more interested in a potential deal, making a killing in some bonds by selling now while the price is high and buying back once the price has fallen. Jimmy and Chas fall out after Jimmy sexually assaults Louise, a 17-year-old runaway, following a night of partying.
5	5	"Pension Fund"	Sarah Hellings	Andrew Maclear	24 October 1989	50 minutes
Leonard has spent a year wooing back a major client, the Municipal Pension Fund, and he assigns the job of advising them to Declan, the bank's senior dealer. Unforeseen problems threaten the deal that Declan is setting up for the bank thanks to Jimmy, a junior dealer.
6	6	"Newspaper Story"	Mike Vardy	Charles Jennings	31 October 1989	50 minutes
Jimmy Destry meets journalist Sarah Douglas at a private party, Not realising her profession, he divulges potentially damaging information about his colleagues and the departure of Ralph Goldring, Shane Longman's former Finance Director. The article is later published in the London Evening Post and includes unfavourable references to team members including a "Scandinavian cow", which Sirkka believes is her. It is later revealed that Max and Sarah were once lovers.
7	7	"Rainforest"	Paul Seed	Andrew Maclear	7 November 1989	50 minutes
Hudson Talbot, Shane Longman's capital markets originator, is woken in the middle of the night by his colleague, Max Lubin, the Bank's Director of Swaps. Hudson is persuaded, reluctantly, to discuss what sounds like another of Max's unorthodox but possibly brilliant schemes.
8	8	"Takeover"	Sarah Hellings	Andrew Maclear	14 November 1989	50 minutes
A dawn raid has occurred and Friedmans, a rival bank, has acquired 15 per cent of Shane Longman's shares. A takeover is threatened and the dealers' jobs are suddenly at stake. Chief Executive James Farrell tries to contact Peter Longman, the bank's major shareholder, only to discover that he is fishing somewhere off the north-west coast of Tahiti and cannot be reached. But a young accountant doing an audit at Shane lets slip to Chas and Declan that things at the rival bank are not what they seem.
9	9	"Japanese Fund"	Mike Vardy	Andrew Maclear	21 November 1989	50 minutes
Peter Longman is in ebullient spirits. As Shane Longman's major shareholder, he has secured a deal with Tokyo-based Ikeda Bank to set up a joint venture. The signing of the agreement between the two banks is to be widely covered by the City press. Leonard Ansen is not so enthusiastic and believes Longman has rushed into the deal too quickly without considering the long-term implications of the tie-up. Ikeda executives give some indication of their desire to eventually take over Shane Longman but walk away from the deal after being less than impressed by what they perceived as a lack of discipline in the dealing room.
10	10	"Max in Space"	Robert Walker	Matthew Bardsley	28 November 1989	50 minutes
Max and Hudson have completed a deal with the Pan Mediterranean Fund, an EEC entity which offers finance to the poorer areas of Europe. Jerome Heron is a difficult character but his deputy, Monique Danvier, is far more likeable.
11	11	"Twelve Degrees Capricorn"	Sarah Hellings	Andrew Maclear	5 December 1989	50 minutes
Eyebrows are raised when Max employs astrology to predict major deals. Thrill-seeking Sirkka enters dangerous territory when she becomes a high-class prostitute and discovers that risk isn't confined to the dealing room floor.
12	12	"Max in Poland"	Mike Vardy	Andrew Maclear	12 December 1989	50 minutes
Whilst finalising an awkward deal in Warsaw, Max becomes very taken by Maxine, who works in an art gallery. Meanwhile, Sirkka hits rock bottom when she collapses with alcoholic poisoning and is rushed to hospital.
13	13	"Hard Drugs and Snails"	Paul Seed	Andrew Maclear	19 December 1989	50 minutes
Wendy is promoted to become the new Head of Derivatives and is replaced as Chief Trader on the floor by the hard-boiled Sylvia Roux Teng. Sirkka gets a wake-up call and decides to join Alcoholics Anonymous. Jimmy Destry is sacked for malpractice after Declan discovers his off-market trades.

=== Series 2 (1990) ===
No. overall	No. in series	Title	Directed by	Written by	Original release date	Duration
14	1	"Toxic Waste Syndrome"	Mike Vardy	Andrew Maclear	18 October 1990	50 minutes
Sirkka investigates a corporate client's background and her passionate reaction brings her into serious conflict with her colleagues and the Bank's executives.
15	2	"Swami's in Town"	Clive Fleury	Andrew Maclear	25 October 1990	50 minutes
Michelle and her new assistant, Hilary, are puzzled by a client who balks at making a profit, and Max is surprised to find that Sylvia – the new Head Trader – believes that his job is not essential to the Bank.
16	3	"The Gnome From Zurich"	Diarmuid Lawrence	Andrew Maclear	1 November 1990	50 minutes
The beautiful Claudine – an old friend of Declan's – persuades him into a deal he soon regrets. Michelle is unsympathetic as he gets into more and more difficulty, but the Bank softball match gives her the chance to help him out.
17	4	"Shoes on the Wrong Foot"	Mike Vardy	Andrew Maclear	8 November 1990	50 minutes
Lee Wolf travels to Prague to complete a multi-million dollar deal but his acquiescence in a colleague's questionable arrangements gets him into difficulty.
18	5	"Ethical Investments"	Clive Fleury	Tom Greenwood	15 November 1990	50 minutes
Hilary's job is threatened when Sylvia tries to convince the Bank's executives that they need staff cuts. The deal which might save her looks like it's going wrong. Sirkka faces a personal trauma on her own.
19	6	"Headhunting"	Diarmuid Lawrence	Andrew Maclear	22 November 1990	50 minutes
Declan and Michelle are having a difficult time. Declan wonders whether things would be better if they did not work together. As it happens, he is approached by another bank but he is unsure why.
20	7	"Strange Attractions"	Mike Vardy	Richard O'Keefe	29 November 1990	50 minutes
Hudson unwillingly introduces his friend, Danny, to the trading floor. Danny is an expert in chaos theory, and starts giving good advice. Sylvia is impressed and thinks Danny should be part of the team. Michelle and Hilary get involved with a deal for an attractive tycoon. For Michelle, it's just business, but Hilary hopes it might be more.
21	8	"Strange Fruits"	Clive Fleury	Andrew Maclear	6 December 1990	50 minutes
Hudson is embroiled in a difficult issue. The childminder has left and Hudson's mother – visiting from the United States – is standing in and looking after his son. Inevitably there's friction. Sirkka finds that she has to look closely at her relationship with her friend, Yolande.
22	9	"A Wolf in Wolf's Clothing"	Diarmuid Lawrence	Andrew Maclear	13 December 1990	50 minutes
Contrary to the image he projects at the Bank, Lee Wolf is a gambler and an unlucky one. His debts put his job and his personal life in jeopardy. He has to pull off something big to survive. While things get worse for Wolf, however, they get better for Declan and Michelle, who have a big decision to make.
23	10	"The Wedding"	Mike Vardy	Andrew Maclear	20 December 1990	50 minutes
Sylvia saddles Hilary and Chas with an unsaleable issue and won't accept that the problem has been caused by her. Hilary's attempts to sort things out are complicated by the fact that everyone at the Bank is off to the wedding of the year.

== Production credits ==
- Creator: Andrew Maclear
- Writers: Andrew Maclear, Matthew Bardsley, Charles Jennings, Tom Greenwood, Richard O'Keefe
- Directors: Mike Vardy, Sarah Hellings, Paul Seed, Robert Walker, Clive Fleury, Diarmuid Lawrence
- Associate Producer: Ron Purdie
- Executive Producers: Andrew Brown, John Hambley
- Producer: Irving Teitelbaum
- Music: Colin Towns

== Series trivia ==
- The series was created by Andrew Maclear, who also wrote the 1989 movie Dealers; the film's dealing room set, which reportedly cost £1,000,000 to construct, was retained for use in "Capital City". The dealing room equipment was provided by Reuters Limited.
- Exterior scenes were shot throughout London and landmarks such as Big Ben, the Palace of Westminster, Tower Bridge, River Thames and St Paul's Cathedral appeared as backdrops. Coincidentally, stylised forms of these icons were also featured in the on-air idents for Euston Films' parent company, Thames Television, that were shown at the end of each episode.
- It is estimated that Euston Films spent more than US$10 million (£5 million) to produce the first 13 episodes (series one)
- The music for the series was composed by Colin Towns and enjoyed some success in its own right.
- The bank's address is shown in an Attachment of Earnings Order (Judgment Debt) served on Lee Wolf as 8 Gracewell Street, London EC2; Wolf's address is shown in the same document as 56 Chalfont Court, 238 Baker Street, London NW1. Neither address actually exists.
- Shane Longman's headquarters are located near the Bank of England; in one episode Michelle Hauptmann loses her driver's licence for one year after being caught speeding in her Porsche and is shown exiting the London Underground at Bank station after catching the Tube to work.
- In the final episode, Michelle and Declan are married and, in the closing scenes, are shown travelling by water taxi to the airport en route to their honeymoon in Venice; their marriage is taken to have occurred on 1 September 1990 as this is the date shown on their travel documents.

== Series quotes ==
- Sylvia Roux Teng to Hilary Rollinger: "Your job involves more than being a smile and dial girl."
- James Farrell to (the newly married) Declan and Michelle McConnochie: "In 30 years of banking, this is the happiest merger I've ever seen", to which Declan replies: "James, this isn't a merger. This is a takeover."

== Broadcast information ==
Capital City was originally broadcast on Thames Television between 26 September 1989 and 20 December 1990; many other ITV regions also carried the programme, though participation and broadcast dates have varied. Despite its short run in the UK, the series was rebroadcast on UKTV Gold. It ran for only 2 series despite good ratings due to Thames deeming the series as too expensive (series 2 was cut to 10 episodes from the 13 of series 1) as Thames was facing a franchise auction in 1991.

The series was also transmitted in Australia by ABC Television, in the United States on selected public television stations, and in Canada on CBC Television, as well as on networks in Switzerland, Germany and Poland.

== Availability ==
The complete series of 23 episodes have been released on DVD.

== See also ==
- Traders, a Canadian drama also involving investment bankers
