= William P. Cartlidge =

British film producer (1942–2021)

William P. Cartlidge (June 16, 1942 – March 3, 2021) was an English film and television producer.

== Life and career ==
William P. Cartlidge was born on June 16, 1942.

Cartlidge worked on three James Bond films, each of which was directed by Lewis Gilbert. He was the first assistant director for the 1967 film You Only Live Twice, the associate producer for the 1977 film The Spy Who Loved Me, and the associate producer for the 1979 film Moonraker.

In 2002, Cartlidge was nominated for an Emmy Award for Outstanding Miniseries at the 54th Primetime Emmy Awards for his work as the producer of Dinotopia.

Cartlidge died on March 3, 2021. He was 78 years old.

== Filmography ==
=== 1960s ===
- The Young Ones (1962), second assistant director
- The Punch and Judy Man (1963), second assistant director
- Summer Holiday (1963), second assistant director
- Girl in the Headlines (1963), assistant director
- The Evil of Frankenstein (1964), assistant director
- Strictly for the Birds (1964), assistant director
- Success Machine (1965), assistant director
- Wild Goose Chase (1965), assistant director
- Struggle for a Mind (1965), assistant director
- Dual Control (1965), producer
- Alfie (1966)
- The Reptile (1966), assistant director
- Born Free (1966), assistant director
- The Double Man (1967), assistant director
- You Only Live Twice (1967), assistant director
- Duffy (1968), production manager

=== 1970s ===
- The Adventurers (1970), assistant director
- Fragment of Fear (1970), assistant director
- The Last Valley (1971), assistant director
- Friends (1971), assistant director
- Nearest and Dearest (1972), assistant director
- Young Winston (1972), assistant director
- Phase IV (1974), assistant director
- That's Your Funeral (1974), assistant director
- Paul and Michelle (1974), associate producer
- Seven Nights in Japan (1976), associate producer
- The Spy Who Loved Me (1977), associate producer
- Moonraker (1979), associate producer

=== 1980s ===
- Educating Rita (1983), co-producer
- Not Quite Jerusalem (1984), co-producer
- Consuming Passions (1988), producer
- Dealers (1989), producer

=== 1990s ===
- The Playboys (1992), producer
- Haunted (1995), co-producer
- Incognito (1997), co-producer
- The Scarlet Tunic (1997), executive producer

=== 2000s ===
- Dinotopia Part 1 (2002), producer
- Dinotopia Part 2 (2002), producer
- Dinotopia Part 3 (2002), producer

=== 2010s ===
- Everything or Nothing 007 (2012), cast member
