= Carol Hemming =

- Occupation: Make-up artist
- Years active: 1980–present

Carol Hemming is a British make-up artist who was nominated in the category of Best Makeup at the 67th Academy Awards. She was nominated for Mary Shelley's Frankenstein, she shared her nomination with Paul Engelen and Daniel Parker.

== Selected filmography ==
- The Bostonians (1984)
- The Remains of the Day (1993)
- Mary Shelley's Frankenstein (1994)
- A Midsummer Night's Dream (1999)
- Hairspray (2007)
- Stardust (2007)
- Dark Shadows (2012)
- The Lone Ranger (2013)
- Jack Ryan: Shadow Recruit (2014)
- Cinderella (2015)
