= Joanna Phillips-Lane =

British actress

Joanna Phillips-Lane is a British actress who played the character Roxy in Carla Lane's sitcom Bread. She also played the character Wendy Foley in Capital City.
