= Space Island One =

- Genre: Science fiction; Adventure
- Created by: Andrew Maclear
- Starring: Judy Loe; Indra Ove; Angus MacInnes; Bruno Eyron; Julia Bremermann; Kourosh Asad; William Oliver
- Countries of origin: Isle of Man; Germany
- Original language: English
- No. of seasons: 2
- No. of episodes: 26

Production
- Producers: Andrew Maclear; Margaret Matheson
- Running time: 45 minutes

Original release
- Network: Sky One
- Release: 7 January – 9 November 1998

Space Island One (or Raumstation Unity in German) is a British/German science fiction television series that ran for 26 episodes beginning in 1998. A co-production between the UK's Sky One channel and the German Vox channel, it starred Judy Loe as Kathryn McTiernan, the commander of the multinational crew of the space station Unity.

Among the screenwriters for the show were Stephen Baxter, P. J. Hammond, Adrian Rigelsford and Andy Lane.

== Cast ==
- Judy Loe as Commander Kathryn MacTiernan
- Angus MacInnes as Lieutenant Commander Walter B. Shannon
- Bruno Eyron as Dusan Kashkavian
- Indra Ové as Paula Hernandez
- William Oliver as Chief Science Officer Lyle Campbell
- Julia Bremermann as Harriet "Harry" Eschenbach
- Kourash Asad as Dr. Kaveh Homayuni
- Sally Grace as the voice of Control
- Charlie Bovenizer as the first baby born in space

== Series overview ==
Season	Episodes	Originally released	
Season	Episodes	First released	Last released
1	13	January 7, 1998	April 1, 1998
2	13	August 17, 1998	November 9, 1998

== Episodes ==
=== Season 1 (1998) ===
No. overall	No. in season	Title	Directed by	Written by	Original release date
1	1	"Message from Keeler"	Dirk Campbell	Andrew Maclear	January 7, 1998
A new crew member, an environmental specialist named Paula Hernandez replaced a man who killed himself and placed a bomb on the Unity.
2	2	"All the News that Fits"	Mary McMurray	Andrew Maclear	January 14, 1998
A visiting journalist uncovers information regarding a secret space mission. Paula Hernandez begins her sexual pursuit of Dusan Kashkavian.
3	3	"Quarantine"	Crispin Reece	Stephen Baxter	January 21, 1998
An acrylic-eating Martian virus is brought aboard for examination and may cost Lyle Campbell his life.
4	4	"Rogue Satellite"	Colin Bucksey	Andrew Maclear	January 21, 1998
5	5	"Dangerous Liaison"	Colin Bucksey	Andrew Maclear	February 4, 1998
6	6	"Crew Test"	Colin Bucksey	Matthew Bardsley	February 11, 1998
7	7	"The Barrier of Second Attention"	Kevin Davies	Matthew Bardsley	February 18, 1998
8	8	"Sarcophagus"	Colin Bucksey	Adrian Rigelsford	February 25, 1998
9	9	"Spring Fever"	Crispin Reece	Andrew Maclear	March 4, 1998
Commander Kathryn MacTiernan is on earth. Lieutenant Commander Walter B. Shannon is running Unity. Paula Hernandez and Dusan Kashkavian hook-up.
10	10	"The Third Man"	Roy Battersby	Matthew Bardsley	March 11, 1998
11	11	"Awakening"	Rick Stroud	Written by: Jimmy Richards; Story by : Andy Lane	March 18, 1998
12	12	"Nemesis"	Kevin Davies	John Brosnan	March 25, 1998
Abandoned Cold-war stealth armoury is accidentally reactivated by one of Shannon's probes and it identifies the space station as a hostile entity.
13	13	"A Child is Born"	Roy Battersby	Andrew Maclear & Adrian Rigelsford	April 1, 1998

=== Season 2 (1998) ===
No. overall	No. in season	Title	Directed by	Written by	Original release date
14	1	"Unfinished Business"	Dirk Campbell	Andrew Maclear	August 17, 1998
15	2	"Split Allegiances"	Sarah Hellings	Andrew Maclear	August 24, 1998
16	3	"Winter Kills"	Sarah Hellings	Andrew Maclear	August 31, 1998
17	4	"A Place in the Sun"	Rick Stroud	Jimmy Richards	September 7, 1998
18	5	"Lost Property"	Dirk Campbell	P.J. Hammond	September 14, 1998
19	6	"Mayfly"	Adrian Shergold	Andy Lane	September 21, 1998
20	7	"Not in My Back Yard"	Rick Stroud	Diane Duane	September 28, 1998
21	8	"Abandoned"	Adrian Shergold	Matthew Bardsley	October 5, 1998
22	9	"Silver Bullet"	Sue Dunderdale	Robert Smith	October 12, 1998
23	10	"Anniversary"	Rick Stroud	Andrew Maclear	October 19, 1998
24	11	"Lost in Space"	Matt McConaghy	Martin Stone	October 26, 1998
25	12	"Money Makes the World Go Around"	Rick Stroud	Written by: Jimmy Richards; Story by : Andy Lane	November 2, 1998
26	13	"Trouble in Paradise"	Rick Stroud	Andrew Maclear	November 9, 1998

== Reception ==
Described by Dave Bradley as “a mix of Moonbase 3 and Jupiter Moon, but more turgid than either," io9 described it as:

The best science fiction show you've never heard of… The show unflinchingly looks at the implications of for-profit science… and provides the most realistic look ever at life in space, including bone-mass loss. A few episodes are dull, but the show is often surprisingly weird and fun… It also features some of the most complex, believable characters of any television show.
