= Andrew Maclear =

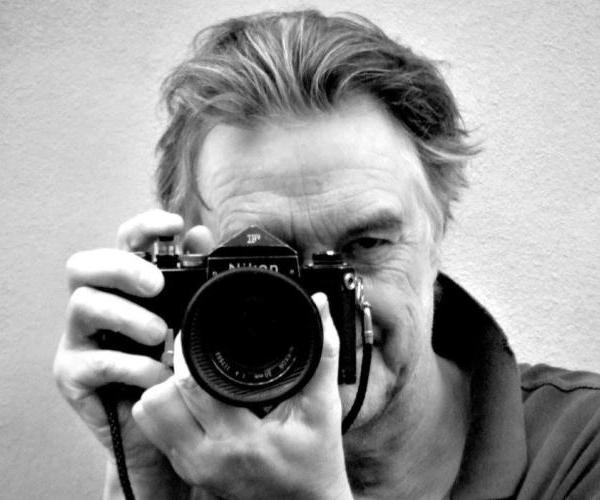
- Born: 13 June 1950 (age 76); Lewes, East Sussex, England
- Occupations: Photographer, screenwriter and documentalist
- Website: www.andrewmaclear.com

Andrew Maclear is an English photographer, screenwriter and documentalist.

== Biography ==
He was born in Lewes (East Sussex) in 1950.

In 1968, he took photographs of John and Yoko Lennon. His images of London in this period appeared in magazines, newsprint and books. Maclear produced several documentaries including a profile of the psychologist p Elisabeth Kübler-Ross.

In the early 1980s, following the success of a feature film set in the city of London starring Rebecca de Mornay, he developed a 26-hour TV series for English television on the same theme; money traders and their lives. Maclear wrote episodes of established TV series and then developed a further 26-hour original series, Space Island One, produced by Margaret Matheson for Sky UK, German and Australian Television.

Maclear moved to Paris when he was fifty and continued writing screenplays. He latterly returned to photography and produced a book about the town of Soller in Mallorca, and became a travel writer. He continues to sell and speak about his photographs from London during the nineteen sixties, many of which are acknowledged as being emblematic of this extraordinary cultural and sociological period.

== Works ==
=== Documentaries ===
Producer/Writer/Director

- Homoepathy (Origins and Principals). Produced with Arabella Churchill, 1978
- Airplay (Profile of New York City and WNEW-FM), 1982 (Director & 2nd camera)
- Rock Steady. Profile of New York City break dancing phenomena (Cameraman)
- Elisabeth Kubler Ross (To Live Until We Die). BBC TV & PBS Boston, 1982
- Randy Newman (Profile of the America composer). BBC TV & PBS Boston, 1983

=== Cinema and drama series ===
Creator and principal writer

- Dealers. Euston Films. Rebecca de Mornay & Paul McGann, 1984
- Capital City. 23 part one hour ensemble series for ITV London, 1989–1990
- Space Island One. 26-hour ensemble TV series for Sky BSB / German and Australian Television, 1998
- Night Kitchen. Pilot episode of ensemble series set in the kitchen world, 2004
- Express Yourself (Cameraman). Short psychological drama produced by Peter Delaunay, 2014
