= Academy Entertainment =

American home video distributor (1985-1994)

- Formerly: Academy Home Entertainment (1984-1987)
- Type: Subsidiary
- Industry: Home video
- Founded: November 20, 1984; 41 years ago
- Founder: Roger Reese
- Defunct: 1994; 32 years ago
- Headquarters: Beverly Hills, California, United States

Academy Entertainment is a home video distributor that was founded in 1984 by Roger Reese as a unit of Artec, Inc. to distribute home video titles. It was based in Beverly Hills, California. The company went defunct in 1994.

== History ==
The company was originally founded in 1984 as Academy Home Entertainment by Roger Reese to distribute videocassettes as a subsidiary of Artec, Inc., with Artec taking majority control of the company. It had two offices in Beverly Hills, California, and Artec's plant in Shelburne, Vermont.

In 1985, Artec took over a 50% stake in the company, and started making pre-recorded home video releases. The company had intended to release low-budget movies on videocassette. The company then signed a deal with Trans-Atlantic Enterprises to release its titles on videocassette after its showings at the American Film Market. In late 1985, Jim Fisher was named executive vice president of Academy Home Entertainment.

In early 1986, the company signed a Canadian home video deal with Monte Video Distributing, Ltd. to issue home video releases in Canada. In mid-1986, the company purchased rights to titles from Crown International Pictures, which were released on home video. In 1986, Robert Baruc was named president of the company, replacing Roger Reese. Around the same time, Academy bought the home video distribution rights to the Troma film Play Dead. In August 1986, the company introduced a new home video line, Infovid, designed for instructional videos.

In 1987, the company signed a deal with Shapiro Entertainment through which Academy released its titles on videocassette. The company shortened its name to Academy Entertainment in 1987 to reflect the expansion, and released its title Concrete Angels, with The Beatles-related merchandise, on home video. In late 1987, the company released the Ralph Bakshi title Coonskin on home video for the first time, under the title Streetfight.

In early 1988, the company reduced prices on 58 titles. In 1988, the company hit its biggest title, Blue Movies, which was released on March 16, 1988. In August 1988, the company signed a deal with Steven Paul's company Paul Home Vision, to release its titles on home video. In September 1988, the company offered two prepack releases of its upcoming titles for November, Sexpot and Take Two. In late 1988, the company entered the laserdisc business.

In 1989, the company expanded into making theatrical films with a distribution deal with Skouras Pictures, with Dealers the first film financed by the video company. In 1990, the company sold home video rights of The Amityville Curse and Amityville 4: The Evil Escapes to rival home video distributor Vidmark Entertainment. Also in 1990, Robert Baruc was named president of the company's theatrical division of the company, Academy Pictures, which was designed to sell films for movie theaters.

In 1992, the company was expanded further, to include a telemarketing arm.

In 1994, foreign film distributor Communications & Entertainment Corp signed a deal to purchase Academy Entertainment from Artec Corporation, and later shut down its business.
