= Emily Bolton =

British actress

- Born: 1951 (age 74–75); Aruba
- Other name: June Bolton
- Occupation: Actress
- Years active: 1973–1992
- Known for: Moonraker; Valentino; Tenko

Emily Bolton (born 1951 in Aruba) is a Dutch actress raised in England and the Netherlands.

== Career ==
Bolton appeared in the James Bond film Moonraker in which she played 007's Brazilian contact Manuela. Originally she had wanted to become a concert pianist, but at the age of eighteen she chose to go to drama school.

She is also known for her TV appearances as a recurring cast member in:

- Space: 1999 in which she played Operative June (uncredited).
- Tenko, the BBC prisoner of war drama in which she played Christina Campbell.
- Capital City in which she played Sylvia Roux Teng.

Her other TV credits include Survivors, Gangsters and Crossroads, and her other films include Percy's Progress (1974), Valentino (1977) and Empire State (1987).

She was credited as June Bolton in some of her early roles. By the release of Tenko Reunion, she had quit acting and become an agent.

== Filmography ==
Film
| Year | Title | Role | Notes |
|---|---|---|---|
| 1974 | Percy's Progress | Miss Thailand | |
| 1976 | Voyage of the Damned | Local Woman | Uncredited |
| 1977 | Valentino | Bianca de Saulles | |
| 1979 | Moonraker | Manuela | |
| 1987 | Empire State | Susan | |

== Television ==
| Year | Title | Role | Notes |
|---|---|---|---|
| 1973 | The Regiment | Victoria Smith | Episode: "Riot" |
| 1975 | Survivors | Tessa | Episode: "Corn Dolly" |
| 1975, 1977 | Play for Today | Pramila, Lady MC | Episodes: "A Passage to England", "Catchpenny Twist" |
| 1975–1976 | Space: 1999 | Operative June | 5 episodes |
| 1976 | Crossroads | Lia Hua | 6 episodes |
| 1976 | Gangsters | Mangit | Regular role (series 1) |
| 1977 | Anna Karenina | Tzigane Singer | Episode: "1.5" |
| 1977 | Die Kette | Liz Mason | Mini-series |
| 1978 | Return of the Saint | Yasmina | Episode: "One Black September" |
| 1980 | The Enigma Files | Yasmin | Episode: "The Full Flying Carpet Treatment" |
| 1981–1985 | Tenko | Christina Campbell | Main role (series 1–3) |
| 1983 | The Winds of War | FDR's Aide at Train Station | Mini-series |
| 1989–1990 | Capital City | Sylvia Roux Teng | 11 episodes |
| 1992 | The Good Guys | Mildred McFadyean | Episode: "Relative Values" |
