= Middlemarch (1994 serial) =

- Based on: Middlemarch by George Eliot
- Screenplay by: Andrew Davies
- Directed by: Anthony Page
- Starring: Juliet Aubrey; Rufus Sewell; Douglas Hodge; Patrick Malahide; Trevyn McDowell; Julian Wadham; Robert Hardy; Peter Jeffrey; Michael Hordern
- Theme music composer: Stanley Myers
- Composers: Stanley Myers (episode 1); Christopher Gunning (episode 2–6)
- Country of origin: United Kingdom
- Original language: English
- No. of series: 1
- No. of episodes: originally aired as 6, but 7 in the worldwide release

Production
- Executive producers: Michael Wearing; Rebecca Eaton
- Producer: Louis Marks
- Production locations: Stamford, Lincolnshire, England; Yeovil, Somerset, England
- Cinematography: Brian Tufano
- Editors: Jerry Leon; Paul Tothill
- Running time: 75 minutes (x1); 60 minutes (x5)
- Production company: WGBH Productions for BBC

Original release
- Network: BBC2
- Release: 12 January – 16 February 1994

Middlemarch is a 1994 British television adaptation of the 1871 novel of the same name by George Eliot. Produced by the BBC in collaboration with the American station WGBH-TV, it was commissioned by Alan Yentob and broadcast on BBC2, with episodes repeated a few days later on BBC1. Comprising six episodes (seven episodes in the worldwide TV series), it is the second television adaptation of the novel. It was directed by Anthony Page from a screenplay by Andrew Davies, and starred Juliet Aubrey, Rufus Sewell, Douglas Hodge and Patrick Malahide.

== Plot ==
The series is based on Middlemarch (1871–72), a novel by George Eliot, which follows the intersecting lives of several residents of a Midlands town. The drama focuses on Dorothea Brooke's ill-fated marriage, the professional struggles of Dr Tertius Lydgate, the romantic fortunes of Fred Vincy and Mary Garth, and the eventual disgrace of the banker Nicholas Bulstrode.

=== Episode 1 ===
In the provincial town of Middlemarch, Dorothea Brooke longs for a purposeful life. Though admired by the young baronet Sir James Chettam, she accepts the proposal of the older clergyman and scholar Edward Casaubon, believing she can assist his intellectual work. Her uncle Mr Brooke supports the match, while Dorothea’s sister Celia has doubts. Meanwhile, the ambitious young doctor Tertius Lydgate arrives in Middlemarch, intent on reforming medical practice, and Fred Vincy, the mayor’s feckless son, counts on inheriting from his wealthy uncle Peter Featherstone while pursuing his childhood sweetheart Mary Garth.

=== Episode 2 ===
On honeymoon in Rome, Dorothea becomes disillusioned with Casaubon’s coldness and obsession with his research. She befriends his penniless cousin Will Ladislaw, whose warmth unsettles her and provokes Casaubon’s jealousy. Back in Middlemarch, Fred’s debts worsen when he borrows against his expected inheritance, drawing Mary’s father Caleb Garth into financial loss. Lydgate gains notice for his advanced views on science and sanitation and is admired by Rosamond Vincy, Fred’s beautiful but self-centred sister.

=== Episode 3 ===
Casaubon’s health declines, intensifying his insecurity about Dorothea’s friendship with Ladislaw. Fred falls gravely ill and is treated by Lydgate, who becomes known for his skill and dedication. Rosamond determines to marry Lydgate despite his modest income, and their growing attachment unsettles his professional ambitions. At Featherstone’s deathbed, Mary refuses to burn one of his two wills, and the estate passes to his illegitimate son Joshua Rigg, leaving Fred disinherited and destitute.

=== Episode 4 ===
Fred begins to reconsider his direction in life, while Rosamond secures Lydgate’s hand in marriage. Their union soon brings financial strain as her extravagance pushes him into debt. Casaubon, increasingly frail, presses Dorothea to promise obedience to his wishes after his death. When he dies suddenly, his will includes a codicil that disinherits Dorothea if she marries Ladislaw, fuelling gossip across Middlemarch and complicating their growing attachment.

=== Episode 5 ===
Nicholas Bulstrode, the town’s wealthy banker and Lydgate’s patron, is blackmailed by the disreputable John Raffles, who threatens to reveal Bulstrode’s past fraud and concealment of inheritances. In panic, Bulstrode hastens Raffles’s death while lending money to Lydgate, who is desperate to clear his debts. When the scandal breaks, Bulstrode is disgraced and Lydgate is suspected of complicity. Though Dorothea defends him, public opinion forces Lydgate and Rosamond into retreat, and his hopes of medical reform collapse.

=== Episode 6 ===
As reputations falter, Fred redeems himself by training as a land agent under Caleb Garth. With the quiet support of the Rev. Farebrother, who suppresses his own feelings for Mary, Fred matures and wins her hand. Bulstrode lives in disgrace, shunned by the town but supported by his wife. Dorothea finally admits her love for Ladislaw, renouncing Casaubon’s fortune and shocking her family by marrying him. The series concludes with Fred and Mary settled in useful domestic life, Lydgate pursuing a conventional medical career outside Middlemarch, and Dorothea and Ladislaw embracing reformist ideals despite limited prospects.

== Cast ==
- Juliet Aubrey as Dorothea Brooke
- Patrick Malahide as Rev. Edward Casaubon
- Rufus Sewell as Will Ladislaw
- Douglas Hodge as Dr Tertius Lydgate
- Robert Hardy as Arthur Brooke
- Caroline Harker as Celia Brooke
- Julian Wadham as Sir James Chettam
- Elizabeth Spriggs as Mrs Cadwallader
- Jonathan Firth as Fred Vincy
- Trevyn McDowell as Rosamund Vincy
- Michael Hordern as Peter Featherstone
- Rachel Power as Mary Garth
- Peter Jeffrey as Bulstrode
- Judi Dench as George Eliot (voiceover)
- Roger Milner as Pratt

== Awards ==
- British Academy Television Awards - Best Actress (Juliet Aubrey), Best Make Up (Anushia Nieradzik), Best Original Television Music (Stanley Myers, Christopher Gunning)
- Broadcasting Press Guild Awards - Best Actress (Juliet Aubrey)
- Writers' Guild of Great Britain - Best Dramatised Serial
- Television and Radio Industries Club Awards - BBC Programme of the Year

== Reactions ==
In a 28 March 1994 review for The New York Times, Elizabeth Kolbert said the mini-series was a hit in Britain as it "mesmerized millions of viewers here, setting off a mini-craze for Victorian fiction. In its wake there were Middlemarch lectures, Middlemarch comics, even a wave of Middlemarch debates. Authors and columnists argued in the London papers over whether Dorothea would, in fact, live happily ever after, whether Casaubon, if left alone, would have finished his great work and finally whether Will Ladislaw entered his marriage bed a virgin." In an 11 April 1994 review in Time magazine, John Elson stated that the series "was a recent critical and popular success in Britain, leading to lectures and even debates on the novel. As a result of the show, a Penguin paperback of the novel topped best-seller lists for five weeks, and is still doing well. The town of Stamford, Lincolnshire, where exteriors were filmed, is preparing for a summertime influx of tourists."
