= Paul Engelen =

British make-up artist (1949–2024)

- Born: Paul Richard Anthony Engelen; 30 October 1949; Walton-on-Thames, Surrey, England
- Died: 3 November 2024 (aged 75)
- Occupation: Make-up artist
- Years active: 1971–2024

Paul Richard Anthony Engelen (30 October 1949 – 3 November 2024) was a British make-up artist. He had over 75 credits in television and film, including the television show Game of Thrones, for which he won a number of Emmy Awards.

== Life and career ==
Engelen was born in Walton-on-Thames, Surrey on 30 October 1949.

Engelen was also twice nominated for the Academy Award for Best Makeup and Hairstyling:

- 1984 Academy Awards- nominated for the film Greystoke: The Legend of Tarzan, Lord of the Apes. Nomination was shared with Rick Baker. Lost to Amadeus.
- 1994 Academy Awards- nominated for Mary Shelley's Frankenstein, nomination shared with Carol Hemming and Daniel Parker. Lost to Ed Wood.

Engelen died from cancer on 3 November 2024, at the age of 75.

At the 97th Academy Awards, his name was mentioned in the In Memoriam section.

== Selected filmography ==
- The Man With The Golden Gun (1974)
- The Spy Who Loved Me (1977)
- Escape to Athena (1979)
- Moonraker (1979)
- Reds (1981)
- Pink Floyd - The Wall (1982)
- Greystoke: The Legend of Tarzan, Lord of the Apes (1984)
- Little Shop of Horrors (1986)
- Empire of the Sun (1987)
- Batman (1989)
- Robin Hood: Prince of Thieves (1991)
- The Three Musketeers (1993)
- Mary Shelley's Frankenstein (1994)
- The Ghost and the Darkness (1996)
- Seven Years in Tibet (1997)
- The Saint (1997)
- Star Wars: Episode I – The Phantom Menace (1999)
- A Midsummer Night's Dream (1999)
- Gladiator (2000)
- Lara Croft: Tomb Raider (2001)
- The Hours (2002)
- Die Another Day (2002)
- Cold Mountain (2003)
- Troy (2004)
- Munich (2005)
- Kingdom of Heaven (2005)
- Casino Royale (2006)
- Quantum of Solace (2008)
- The Chronicles of Narnia: Prince Caspian (2008)
- Robin Hood (2010)
- Wrath of the Titans (2012)
- Hercules (2014)
