= Trevyn McDowell =

South African actress and property developer

- Born: 26 April 1967 (age 59); Johannesburg, South Africa
- Occupation: Actress
- Years active: 1988–1999
- Known for: Mary Shelley's Frankenstein
- Spouse: Julian McGowan
- Children: Ruby (born 2001); Zachary (born 2002); Gabriel (born 2006); Ryder (born 2009)

Trevyn McDowell is a former actress and a property developer, who has starred in films, television programmes, theatre and radio, predominantly in her adopted homeland of England.

She appeared in the 1994 film Mary Shelley's Frankenstein and was Rosamund Vincy in Middlemarch. She is also well known for her portrayal of Michelle Hauptmann in Capital City a 1989 television series produced by Euston Films which focused on the professional and personal lives of a group of investment bankers working on the corporate trading floor of Shane-Longman, a fictional international bank based in the City of London.
