= Mary Shelley's Frankenstein (film) =

1994 film directed by Kenneth Branagh

- Theatrical release poster
- Directed by: Kenneth Branagh
- Screenplay by: Steph Lady; Frank Darabont
- Based on: Frankenstein; or, The Modern Prometheus by Mary Shelley
- Produced by: Francis Ford Coppola; James V. Hart; John Veitch
- Starring: Robert De Niro; Kenneth Branagh; Tom Hulce; Helena Bonham Carter; Aidan Quinn; Ian Holm; John Cleese
- Cinematography: Roger Pratt
- Edited by: Andrew Marcus
- Music by: Patrick Doyle
- Production companies: TriStar Pictures; Japan Satellite Broadcasting, Inc.; IndieProd Company Productions; American Zoetrope
- Distributed by: TriStar Pictures
- Release dates: November 3, 1994 (London); November 4, 1994 (US)
- Running time: 123 minutes
- Countries: United States; Japan
- Language: English
- Budget: $45 million
- Box office: $112 million

Mary Shelley's Frankenstein is a 1994 science fiction gothic horror film directed by Kenneth Branagh, who also stars as Victor Frankenstein, with Robert De Niro portraying Frankenstein's monster (called the Creation in the film), and co-starring Tom Hulce, Helena Bonham Carter, Ian Holm, John Cleese, Richard Briers and Aidan Quinn. It is considered to be one of the most faithful film adaptations of Mary Shelley's 1818 novel Frankenstein; or, The Modern Prometheus, despite several differences and additions. Like the source material, the story follows Frankenstein, a medical student who produces the Creation, a creature made of human body parts, leading to dark consequences.

Mary Shelley's Frankenstein premiered at the London Film Festival on November 3, 1994, and was released theatrically on November 4, 1994, by TriStar Pictures. The film received mixed reviews from critics and grossed $112 million worldwide on a budget of $45 million, making it less successful than the previous Francis Ford Coppola-produced horror adaptation Bram Stoker's Dracula (1992).

== Plot ==
In 1794, Captain Walton leads an expedition to the North Pole. While their ship is trapped in ice, a frightening noise is heard and a cloaked man emerges from the mist, telling the crew to follow him with their weapons. The dogs run toward the noise but are killed by its source. The newcomer reveals that his name is Victor Frankenstein and tells his life story (in flashback).

Victor grows up with his adopted sister Elizabeth Lavenza. Victor's mother dies giving birth to his brother William, and Victor vows to find a way to conquer death. He and his friend Henry Clerval study medicine at the University of Ingolstadt under professor Shmael Augustus Waldman, whose notes contain information on creating life. Waldman warns Victor not to use them lest he create an abomination.

While inoculating people for smallpox, Waldman is murdered by a patient who is subsequently hanged. Using the killer's body and Waldman's brain, Victor builds a creature based on Waldman's notes. He gives his creation life but is horrified by the creature's hideous appearance and tries to kill him. The creature steals Victor's coat and flees.

The creature shelters for months in a family's barn, learning to read and speak by watching them. He attempts to earn their trust by anonymously tending to their land and bringing them food, and he eventually converses with the elderly, blind patriarch. When the man's family returns and sees the creature, they are terrified by his appearance and chase him away. The creature finds Victor's journal and learns the circumstances of his creation. After returning to the farmhouse, he discovers that the family has abandoned it. He burns down the farm and vows revenge on Victor for bringing him into a world that hates him.

Returning to Geneva to marry Elizabeth, Victor learns that his younger brother William has been murdered. The Frankensteins' servant Justine is blamed and hanged by a violent mob. The creature makes his survival known to Victor and abducts him, admitting that he is the killer. He demands the creation of a female companion for him, promising in return to leave Victor and humanity in peace. Victor agrees, but when the creature insists that he use Justine's body, he is horrified and breaks his promise.

The creature exacts revenge on Victor by killing his father, and then, during Victor's wedding night, he breaks into Elizabeth's bridal suite and rips out her heart. Seized by grief and obsession, Victor races to bring Elizabeth back to life. He stitches her head and hands onto Justine's body and reanimates her as a disfigured, mindless shadow of her former self. The creature demands Elizabeth as his bride, leading to a fight with Victor. Realizing what has been done to her, Elizabeth ends her existence by setting herself on fire. Victor and the creature escape as the mansion burns.

Back in the Arctic, Victor tells Walton that he has been pursuing his creation for months to kill him. Victor dies of pneumonia. Walton later discovers the creature weeping over Victor's body, having lost the only family that he has known. The crew prepares a funeral pyre, but the ice around the ship cracks. Walton invites the creature onto the ship, but the creature chooses to remain with the pyre. He takes the torch and burns himself alive with Victor's body. Walton, seeing the consequences of Victor's obsession, orders the ship to return home, avoiding repeating his mistakes.

== Cast ==
- Robert De Niro as The Creature, a reanimated corpse who is rejected by humanity and swears revenge on the world as a result
  - De Niro also portrays the Sharp-Featured Man, the killer of Professor Waldman whose corpse is the primary one used for the creature
- Kenneth Branagh as Victor Frankenstein, a Genevese scientist obsessed with conquering death
  - Rory Jennings as young Victor
- Tom Hulce as Henry Clerval, Frankenstein's friend and partner
- Helena Bonham Carter as Elizabeth Lavenza Frankenstein, Frankenstein's adoptive sister and fiancée
  - Hannah Taylor-Gordon as young Elizabeth
- Ian Holm as Baron Alphonse Frankenstein, Victor Frankenstein's father
- John Cleese as Professor Waldman, Frankenstein's mentor
- Aidan Quinn as ship's commander Captain Robert Walton
- Richard Briers as Grandfather
- Robert Hardy as Professor Krempe
- Trevyn McDowell as Justine Moritz, a nursemaid in the Frankenstein household
  - Christina Cuttall as young Justine
- Celia Imrie as Mrs. Moritz, the head housekeeper of the Frankenstein household and Justine's mother
- Cherie Lunghi as Caroline Beaufort Frankenstein, Victor's mother
- Ryan J.W. Smith as William Frankenstein, Victor's younger brother
  - Charles Wyn-Davies as young William Frankenstein
- Hugh Bonneville as Schiller
- Gerard Horan as Claude
- Mark Hadfield as Felix
- Joanna Roth as Marie
- Jimmy Yuill as Grigori
- Jenny Galloway as Vendor's wife
- Alex Lowe as Crewman
- George Asprey as Policeman
- Patrick Doyle (uncredited) as Ballroom orchestra conductor

== Production ==
Steph Lady wrote the original script to the film that was sold to Francis Ford Coppola's American Zoetrope. Coppola originally intended to direct the film, having already directed Bram Stoker's Dracula (1992), but instead elected to serve as producer. Coppola wanted Robert De Niro cast as The Creature above all else, which resulted in his casting over considerations of casting Gérard Depardieu and Andy García.

De Niro chose Branagh to direct the film. Branagh brought in Frank Darabont to write a second draft of the screenplay, insisting on including elements from the novel that had not been present in the script, complete with having as many "explicitly sexual birth images" to go along with elements inspired from Mary Shelley's life in terms of her being "surrounded by images of death". As opposed to the novel, the film includes a re-created bride due to Branagh believing that it seemed to "make psychological sense" while reflecting on his difference from James Whale in his staging for both of his Frankenstein films that he stated as having "high camp".

Filming began on October 21, 1993, and wrapped on February 25, 1994. Branagh stated in an interview that the film was "a family tragedy, like Shakespeare. There are lots of echoes of 'Hamlet' in it, I think. Victor Frankenstein is the opposite side of the same coin as Hamlet. Instead of forming a philosophy of death and our journey toward it, he resists it. He says, 'Let's stop them dying and see if we can do it better.' He replaces Hamlet's intellectual pursuit with physical action. And still isn't happy." De Niro studied stroke victims in preparation for the voice of The Creature.

=== Music ===
All music is composed by Patrick Doyle.

Frankenstein (Original Motion Picture Soundtrack)
No.	Title	Length
1.	"To Think of a Story"	3:30
2.	"What's Out There?"	2:51
3.	"There's an Answer"	4:35
4.	"I Won't If You Won't"	1:58
5.	"A Perilous Direction"	3:20
6.	"A Risk Worth Taking"	3:19
7.	"Victor Begins"	0:54
8.	"Even If You Die"	2:16
9.	"The Creation"	2:01
10.	"Evil Stitched to Evil"	4:43
11.	"The Escape"	1:47
12.	"The Reunion"	0:46
13.	"The Journal"	1:04
14.	"Friendless"	2:09
15.	"William!"	2:44
16.	"Death of Justine/Sea of Ice"	3:55
17.	"Yes I Speak"	5:37
18.	"God Forgive Me"	0:57
19.	"Please Wait"	3:21
20.	"The Honeymoon"	1:17
21.	"The Wedding Night"	2:05
22.	"Elizabeth"	4:11
23.	"She's Beautiful"	3:35
24.	"He Was My Father"	6:10
Total length:		1:09:00

== Release ==
The film had its world premiere on November 3, 1994, at the London Film Festival before opening in the United Kingdom and United States on November 4.

== Reception ==
=== Critical response ===
On the review aggregator website Rotten Tomatoes, 42% of 52 critics' reviews are positive, with an average rating of 5.5/10. The website's consensus reads: "Mary Shelley's Frankenstein is ambitious and visually striking, but the overwrought tone and lack of scares make for a tonally inconsistent experience."

Roger Ebert of the Chicago Sun-Times gave the film 2½ stars out of 4, writing: "I admired the scenes with De Niro [as the Creature] so much I'm tempted to give Mary Shelley's Frankenstein a favorable verdict. But it's a near miss. The Creature is on target, but the rest of the film is so frantic, so manic, it doesn't pause to be sure its effects are registered."

Janet Maslin of The New York Times wrote, "Branagh is in over his head. He displays neither the technical finesse to handle a big, visually ambitious film nor the insight to develop a stirring new version of this story. Instead, this is a bland, no-fault Frankenstein for the '90s, short on villainy but loaded with the tragically misunderstood. Even the Creature (Robert De Niro), an aesthetically challenged loner with a father who rejected him, would make a dandy guest on any daytime television talk show."

Conversely, James Berardinelli of Reelviews.net gave the film three stars out of four: "Mary Shelley's Frankenstein may not be the definitive version of the 1818 novel, and the director likely attempted more than is practical for a two-hour film, but overambition is preferable to the alternative, especially if it results—as in this case—in something more substantial than Hollywood's typical, fitfully entertaining fluff."

James Lowder reviewed Mary Shelley's Frankenstein in White Wolf Inphobia #55 (May, 1995), rating it 3 out of 5, and stated that "the prolonged goop-wrestling that follows the Creature's birth and the uncomfortable dance scene with Victor and the reanimated Elizabeth tumble right past melodrama into the realm of outright weirdness."

Audiences polled by CinemaScore gave the film an average grade of "B−" on a scale of A+ to F.

=== Box office ===
Mary Shelley's Frankenstein collected $11,212,889 during its opening weekend, ranking in second place at the box office below Stargate. In the US and Canada, the film grossed $22,006,296, with the opening weekend making up more than half of its total. The film opened the same day in the United Kingdom and Ireland and was the number one film with a gross of $2 million (£1.3 million) in its opening weekend from 320 screens. It remained at number one in the UK for a second week. Outside the U.S. and Canada, it grossed $90 million, bringing the worldwide gross to $112 million.

=== Frank Darabont ===
Original screenwriter Steph Lady, who sold the script to Francis Ford Coppola's American Zoetrope, said, "The film was a shocking disappointment; a misshapen monster born of Kenneth Branagh's runaway ego. He took a poignant, thought-provoking tragedy and turned it into a heavy metal monster movie. The casting of Robert De Niro as the monster was beyond inexplicable." Frank Darabont, who did a second draft, called the film "the best script I ever wrote and the worst movie I've ever seen". He elaborated:

There's a weird doppelgänger effect when I watch the movie. It's kind of like the movie I wrote, but not at all like the movie I wrote. It has no patience for subtlety. It has no patience for quiet moments. It has no patience period. It's big and loud and blunt and rephrased by the director at every possible turn. Cumulatively, the effect was a totally different movie. I don't know why Branagh needed to make this big, loud film ... the material was subtle. Shelley's book was way out there in a lot of ways, but it's also very subtle. I don't know why it had to be this operatic attempt at filmmaking. Shelley's book is not operatic, it whispers at you a lot. The movie was a bad one. That was my Waterloo. That's where I really got my ass kicked most as a screenwriter ... [Branagh] really took the brunt of the blame for that film, which was appropriate. That movie was his vision entirely. If you love that movie you can throw all your roses at Ken Branagh's feet. If you hated it, throw your spears there too, because that was his movie.

=== Year-end lists ===
- 3rd worst – Peter Travers, Rolling Stone
- 9th worst – Janet Maslin, The New York Times

=== Accolades ===
Award	Category	Recipients	Result
Academy Awards	Best Makeup	Daniel Parker, Paul Engelen, Carol Hemming	Nominated
British Academy Film Awards	Best Production Design	Tim Harvey	Nominated
Saturn Awards	Best Horror/Thriller Film		Nominated
Saturn Awards	Best Actor	Kenneth Branagh	Nominated
Saturn Awards	Best Actress	Helena Bonham Carter	Nominated
Saturn Awards	Best Make-up	Daniel Parker, Paul Engelen	Nominated
Saturn Awards	Best Music	Patrick Doyle	Nominated
Saturn Awards	Best Supporting Actor	Robert De Niro	Nominated
Saturn Awards	Best Writing	Steph Lady, Frank Darabont	Nominated

== Video game ==
A video game adaptation based on the film was released on numerous home video game consoles in 1994. A themed pinball machine was released in early 1995 by Sega Pinball; it is one of the machines included in the video pinball simulator The Pinball Arcade.

== See also ==
- Frankenstein in popular culture
- List of films featuring Frankenstein's monster
- Bram Stoker's Dracula (1992), a similar adaptation from Coppola
