= Dealers (film) =

- Theatrical poster
- Directed by: Colin Bucksey
- Written by: Andrew Maclear
- Produced by: William P Cartlidge
- Starring: Paul McGann; Rebecca De Mornay; Derrick O'Connor; John Castle; Paul Guilfoyle; Adrian Dunbar; Sara Sugarman
- Cinematography: Peter Sinclair
- Edited by: Jon Costelloe
- Music by: Richard Hartley
- Production companies: Euston Films; Rank Organisation
- Distributed by: J. Arthur Rank Film Distributors
- Release date: 15 September 1989 (Toronto Festival of Festivals)
- Running time: 87 minutes
- Country: United Kingdom
- Language: English

Dealers is a 1989 British film directed by Colin Bucksey. It stars Paul McGann and Rebecca De Mornay.

== Plot ==
Based at the London branch of Whitney Paine, a fictional American investment bank; possibly a play on the names of Paine Webber and Dean Witter.

== Cast ==
- Paul McGann as Daniel Pascoe
- Rebecca De Mornay as Anna Schuman
- Derrick O'Connor as Robbie Barrell
- John Castle as Frank Mallory
- Paul Guilfoyle as Lee Peters
- Adrian Dunbar as Lennon Mayhew
- Sara Sugarman as Elana

== Production ==
Part of the finance came from the Rank Organisation. The American rights were sold to Academy Entertainment and Skouras Pictures.

== Reception ==
The Evening Standard wrote "not a character in it rings true." The Sunday Telegraph called the screenplay "a disaster of October crash proportions."

Dealers received a fairly mixed response from American critics at the Austin, Texas Film Festival, some describing it as 'poorly acted' and 'poorly scripted', with others describing it as having an 'edge-of-your-seat climax'. The film was popular among university students.

However, the film was extremely popular by the very people it protagonised: Risk taking "propriety traders" or "prop traders."

== Legacy ==
The dealing room itself was so meticulous, costing a rumoured one million pounds, that it was kept intact and reused for Capital City (TV series), a UK TV series which successfully capitalised on the post Wall Street, trendy City Job, City Lifestyle. Both film and TV series being produced by Euston Films. One visible change for its reuse were the three prominent clocks over the door to the trading room: 'Frankfurt', 'London' and 'New York' instead became 'London','New York' and 'Tokyo'.
