= List of awards and nominations received by Bill Maher =

Bill Maher awards and nominations
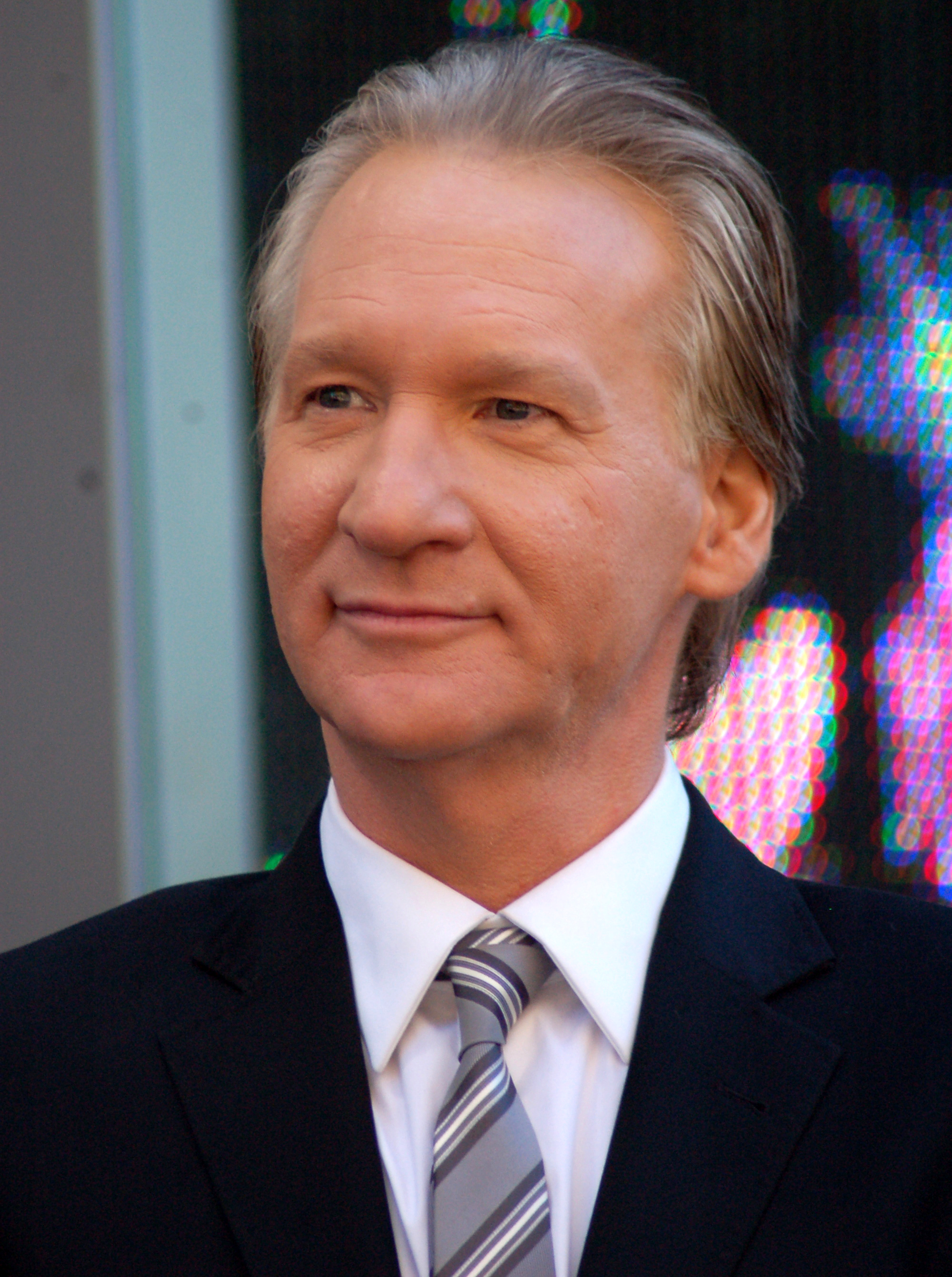
- Maher in 2010
Award	Wins	Nominations
Primetime Emmy Awards	1	41
Grammy Awards	0	2

Bill Maher is an American comedian and commentator best known for his ABC series Politically Incorrect (1993–2002) and HBO series Real Time with Bill Maher (2003–present).

Recognized with a Star on the Hollywood Walk of Fame since 2010, Maher became the 27th recipient of the Mark Twain Prize for American Humor in 2026.

He has received 41 Primetime Emmy Award nominations, winning as executive producer of Vice for Outstanding Informational Series or Special in 2014. His two Grammy Award nominations for Spoken Word Album recognized When You Ride Alone You Ride with bin Laden in 2004 and New Rules: Polite Musings from a Timid Observer in 2007. Maher has also received thirteen Producers Guild of America Award nominations and fifteen Writers Guild of America Award nominations.

== Major associations ==
=== Emmy Awards ===
Year	Category	Nominated work	Result	Ref.
Primetime Emmy Awards
1995	Outstanding Variety, Music or Comedy Series	Politically Incorrect	Nominated	
1996	Outstanding Variety, Music or Comedy Series	Politically Incorrect	Nominated	
1996	Outstanding Writing in a Variety or Music Program	Politically Incorrect	Nominated	
1997	Outstanding Variety, Music or Comedy Series	Politically Incorrect	Nominated	
1997	Outstanding Writing in a Variety or Music Program	Politically Incorrect	Nominated	
1997	Outstanding Performance in a Variety of Music Program	Politically Incorrect	Nominated	
1998	Outstanding Variety, Music or Comedy Series	Politically Incorrect	Nominated	
1999	Outstanding Variety, Music or Comedy Series	Politically Incorrect	Nominated	
2000	Outstanding Variety, Music or Comedy Series	Politically Incorrect	Nominated	
2001	Outstanding Variety, Music or Comedy Series	Politically Incorrect	Nominated	
2002	Outstanding Variety, Music or Comedy Series	Politically Incorrect	Nominated	
2004	Outstanding Performance in a Variety of Music Program	Real Time with Bill Maher	Nominated	
2005	Outstanding Variety, Music or Comedy Series	Real Time with Bill Maher	Nominated	
2005	Outstanding Writing for a Variety, Music or Comedy Program	Real Time with Bill Maher	Nominated	
2006	Outstanding Variety, Music or Comedy Series	Real Time with Bill Maher	Nominated	
2006	Outstanding Writing for a Variety, Music or Comedy Program	Real Time with Bill Maher	Nominated	
2006	Outstanding Variety, Music or Comedy Special	Bill Maher: I'm Swiss	Nominated	
2007	Outstanding Variety, Music or Comedy Series	Real Time with Bill Maher	Nominated	
2007	Outstanding Writing for a Variety, Music or Comedy Program	Real Time with Bill Maher	Nominated	
2008	Outstanding Variety, Music or Comedy Series	Real Time with Bill Maher	Nominated	
2008	Outstanding Variety, Music or Comedy Special	Bill Maher: The Decider	Nominated	
2009	Outstanding Variety, Music or Comedy Series	Real Time with Bill Maher	Nominated	
2010	Outstanding Variety, Music or Comedy Series	Real Time with Bill Maher	Nominated	
2010	Outstanding Writing for a Variety, Music or Comedy Series	Real Time with Bill Maher	Nominated	
2010	Outstanding Variety, Music or Comedy Special	Bill Maher...But I'm Not Wrong	Nominated	
2010	Outstanding Writing for a Variety, Music or Comedy Special	Bill Maher...But I'm Not Wrong	Nominated	
2011	Outstanding Variety, Music or Comedy Series	Real Time with Bill Maher	Nominated	
2012	Outstanding Variety Series	Real Time with Bill Maher	Nominated	
2012	Outstanding Writing for a Variety Series	Real Time with Bill Maher	Nominated	
2013	Outstanding Variety Series	Real Time with Bill Maher	Nominated	
2013	Outstanding Writing for a Variety Series	Real Time with Bill Maher	Nominated	
2013	Outstanding Documentary or Nonfiction Series	Vice	Nominated	
2014	Outstanding Variety Series	Real Time with Bill Maher	Nominated	
2014	Outstanding Informational Series or Special	Vice	Won	
2015	Outstanding Variety Special	Bill Maher: Live from D.C.	Nominated	
2015	Outstanding Informational Series or Special	Vice	Nominated	
2016	Outstanding Variety Talk Series	Real Time with Bill Maher	Nominated	
2016	Outstanding Informational Series or Special	Vice	Nominated	
2017	Outstanding Variety Talk Series	Real Time with Bill Maher	Nominated	
2017	Outstanding Informational Series or Special	Vice	Nominated	
2018	Outstanding Informational Series or Special	Vice	Nominated	
2024	Outstanding Short Form Comedy, Drama or Variety Series	Real Time with Bill Maher: Overtime	Nominated	

=== Grammy Awards ===
Year	Category	Nominated work	Result	Ref.
2004	Best Spoken Word Album	When You Ride Alone You Ride with bin Laden	Nominated	
2007	Best Spoken Word Album	New Rules: Polite Musings from a Timid Observer	Nominated	

=== Tony Award ===
Year	Category	Nominated work	Result	Ref.
2003	Best Special Theatrical Event	Bill Maher: Victory Begins at Home	Nominated	

== Industry awards ==
=== Producers Guild of America Awards ===
Year	Category	Nominated work	Result	Ref.
2006	Outstanding Producer of Variety Television	Real Time with Bill Maher	Nominated	
2007	Outstanding Producer of Variety Television	Real Time with Bill Maher	Won	
2008	Outstanding Producer of Live Entertainment & Competition Television	Real Time with Bill Maher	Nominated	
2009	Outstanding Producer of Live Entertainment & Competition Television	Real Time with Bill Maher	Nominated	
2011	Outstanding Producer of Live Entertainment & Competition Television	Real Time with Bill Maher	Nominated	
2012	Outstanding Producer of Live Entertainment & Competition Television	Real Time with Bill Maher	Nominated	
2013	Outstanding Producer of Live Entertainment & Competition Television	Real Time with Bill Maher	Nominated	
2014	Outstanding Producer of Live Entertainment & Competition Television	Real Time with Bill Maher	Nominated	
2015	Outstanding Producer of Live Entertainment & Competition Television	Real Time with Bill Maher	Nominated	
2016	Outstanding Producer of Live Entertainment & Competition Television	Real Time with Bill Maher	Nominated	
2016	Outstanding Producer of Non-Fiction Television	Vice	Nominated	
2017	Outstanding Producer of Live Entertainment & Talk Television	Real Time with Bill Maher	Nominated	
2019	Outstanding Producer of Live Entertainment & Talk Television	Real Time with Bill Maher	Nominated	

=== Writers Guild of America Awards ===
Year	Category	Nominated work	Result	Ref.
2001	Comedy-Variety Talk Series	Politically Incorrect	Nominated	
2002	Comedy-Variety Talk Series	Politically Incorrect	Nominated	
2004	Comedy-Variety Talk Series	Real Time with Bill Maher	Nominated	
2005	Comedy-Variety Talk Series	Real Time with Bill Maher	Nominated	
2006	Comedy-Variety Talk Series	Real Time with Bill Maher	Nominated	
2007	Comedy-Variety Talk Series	Real Time with Bill Maher	Nominated	
2008	Comedy-Variety Talk Series	Real Time with Bill Maher	Nominated	
2009	Comedy-Variety Talk Series	Real Time with Bill Maher	Nominated	
2010	Comedy-Variety Talk Series	Real Time with Bill Maher	Nominated	
2012	Comedy-Variety Talk Series	Real Time with Bill Maher	Nominated	
2013	Comedy-Variety Talk Series	Real Time with Bill Maher	Nominated	
2015	Comedy-Variety Talk Series	Real Time with Bill Maher	Nominated	
2015	Best Comedy/Variety – Specials	Bill Maher: Live from DC	Nominated	
2016	Comedy/Variety – Talk Series	Real Time with Bill Maher	Nominated	
2018	Comedy/Variety – Talk Series	Real Time with Bill Maher	Nominated	
