= 58th Primetime Creative Arts Emmy Awards =

2006 American television programming awards

- Date: August 19, 2006
- Location: Shrine Auditorium; Los Angeles, California
- Presented by: Academy of Television Arts & Sciences
- Most awards: Elizabeth I (5)

The 58th Primetime Creative Arts Emmy Awards honored the best in artistic and technical achievement in American prime time television programming from June 1, 2005, until May 31, 2006, as chosen by the Academy of Television Arts & Sciences. The awards were presented on August 19, 2006, at the Shrine Auditorium in Los Angeles, California. A total of 79 Creative Arts Emmys were handed out across 67 categories. The ceremony preceded the 58th Primetime Emmy Awards, held on August 27.

The miniseries Elizabeth I led all programs with five wins, followed by Baghdad ER and Rome with four wins each and the 78th Annual Academy Awards with three wins. For overall program fields, awards went to Baghdad ER, Before the Dinosaurs, Dance in America: Swan Lake with American Ballet Theatre, Extreme Makeover: Home Edition, High School Musical, I Have Tourette's but Tourette's Doesn't Have Me, Rome: Engineering an Empire, The Simpsons, 10 Days That Unexpectedly Changed America, The XX Olympic Winter Games – Opening Ceremony, and Two Days in October. HBO led all networks with 17 wins.

== Winners and nominees ==
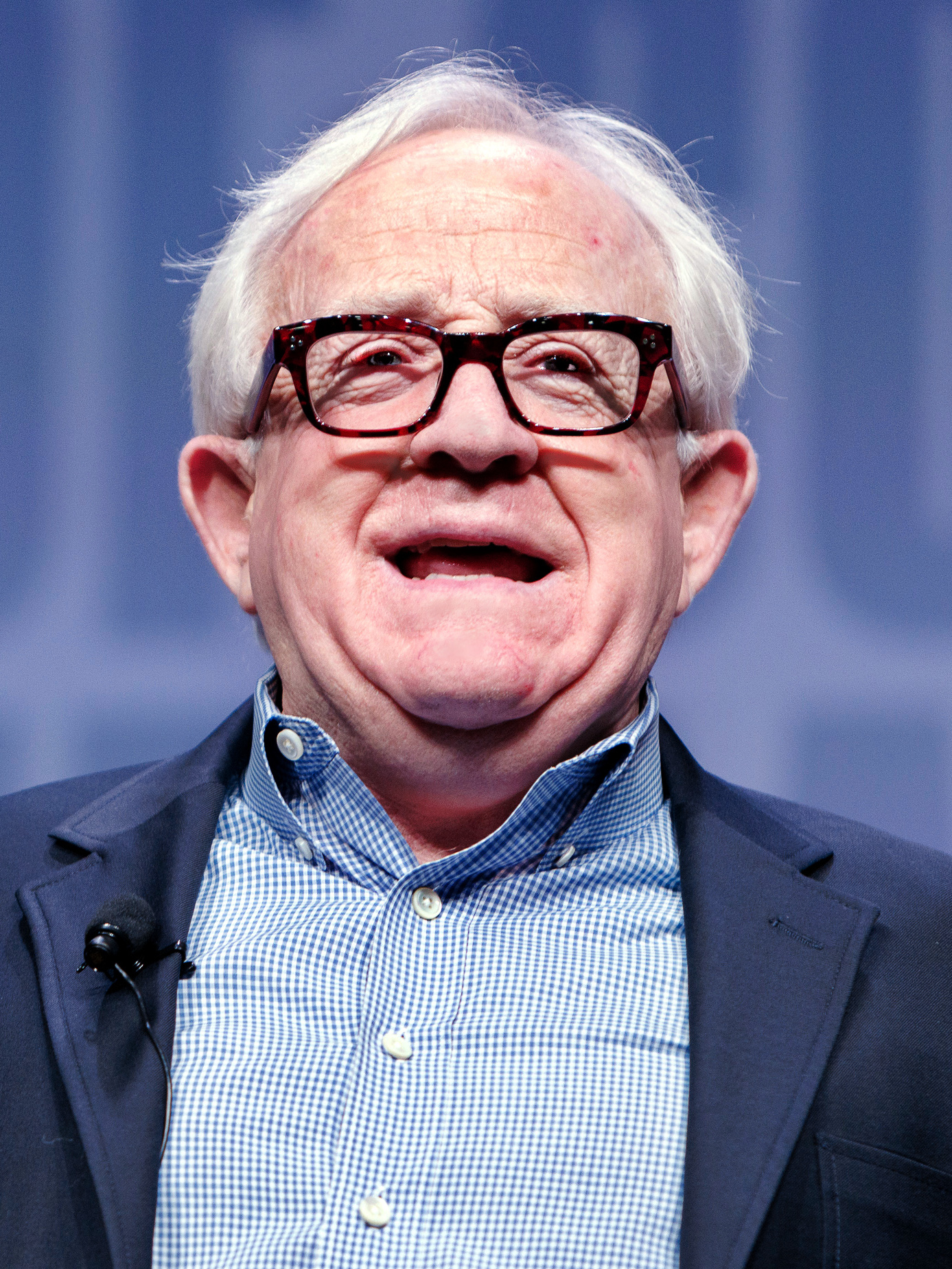
Leslie Jordan, Outstanding Guest Actor in a Comedy Series winner

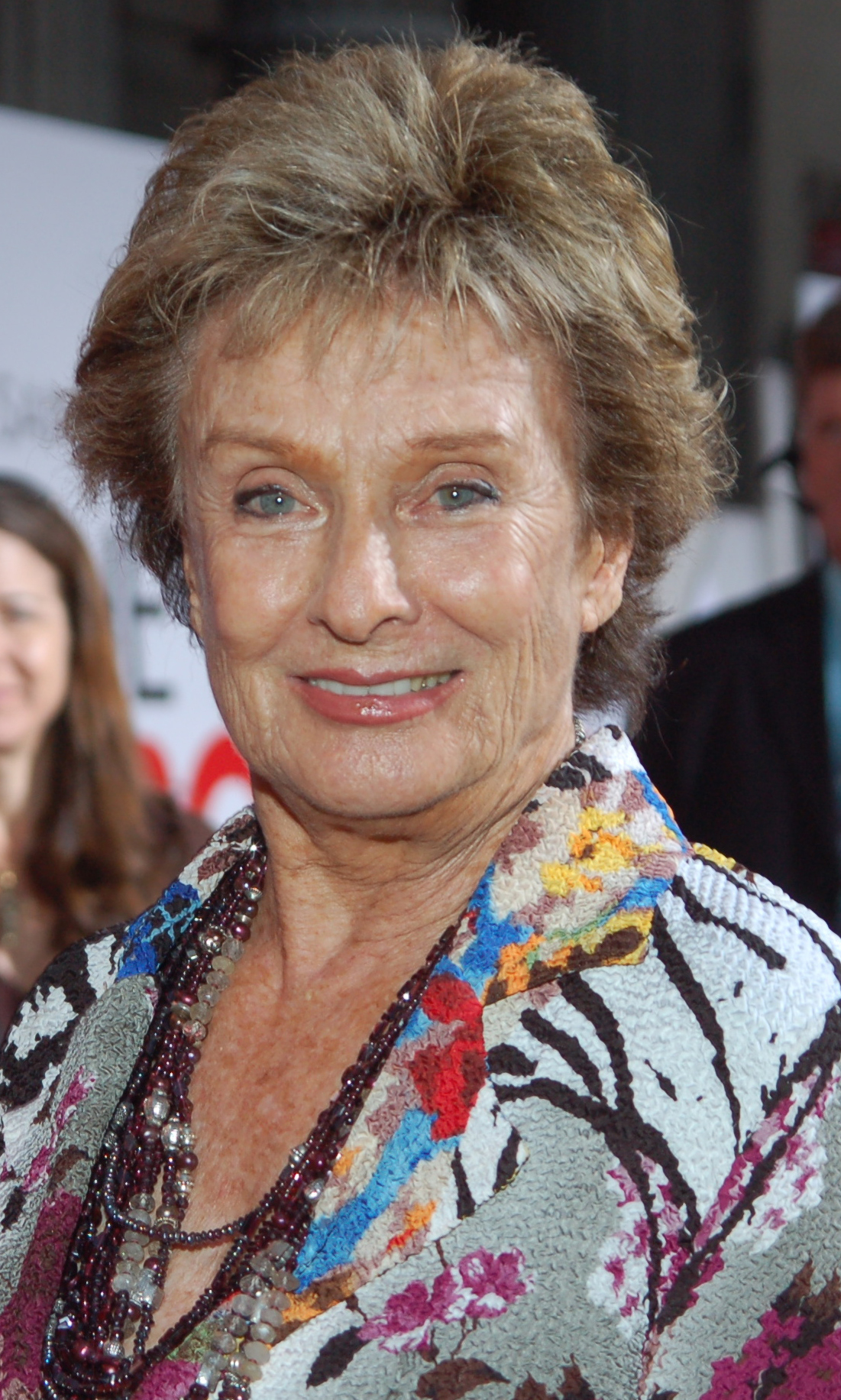
Cloris Leachman, Outstanding Guest Actress in a Comedy Series winner

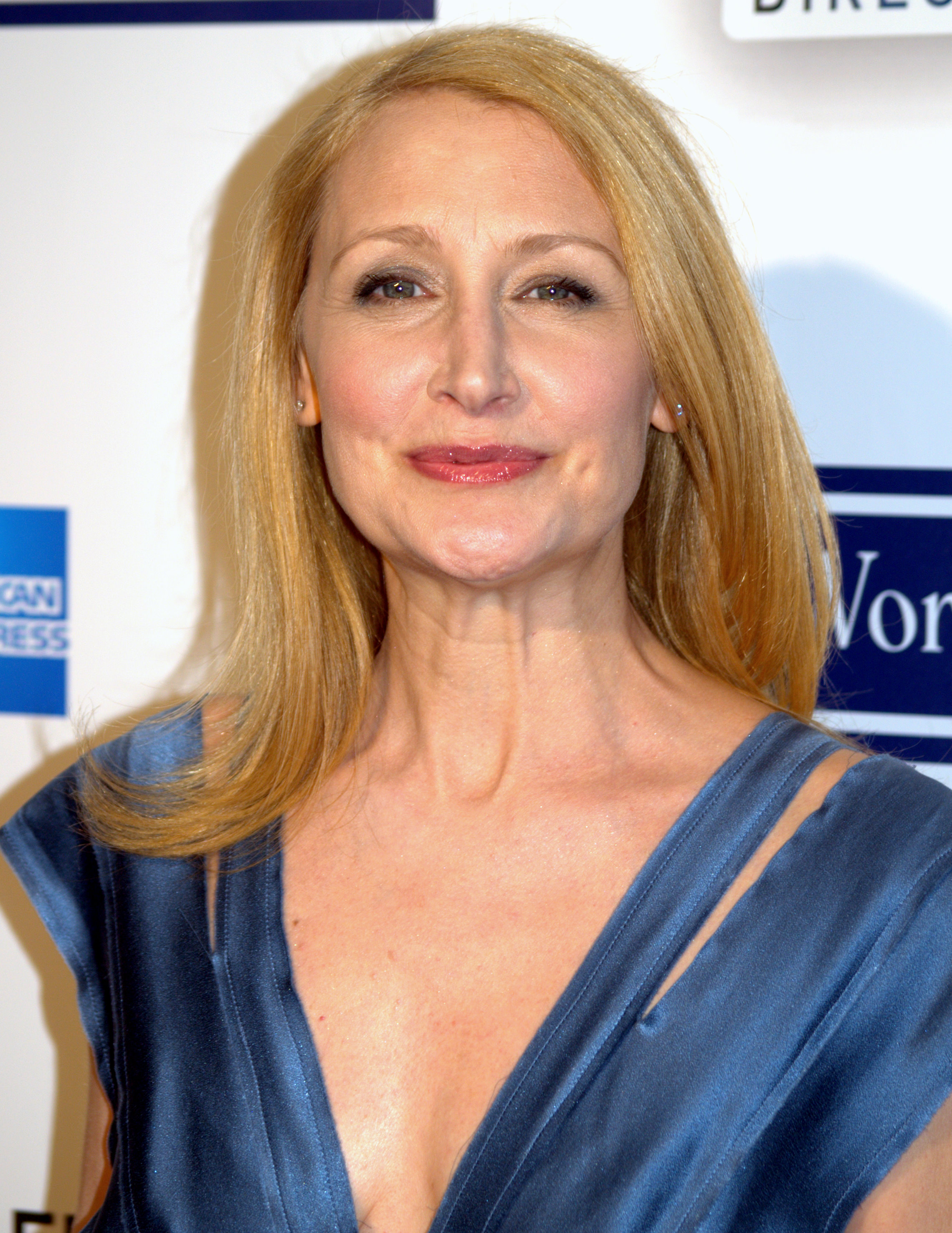
Patricia Clarkson, Outstanding Guest Actress in a Drama Series winner

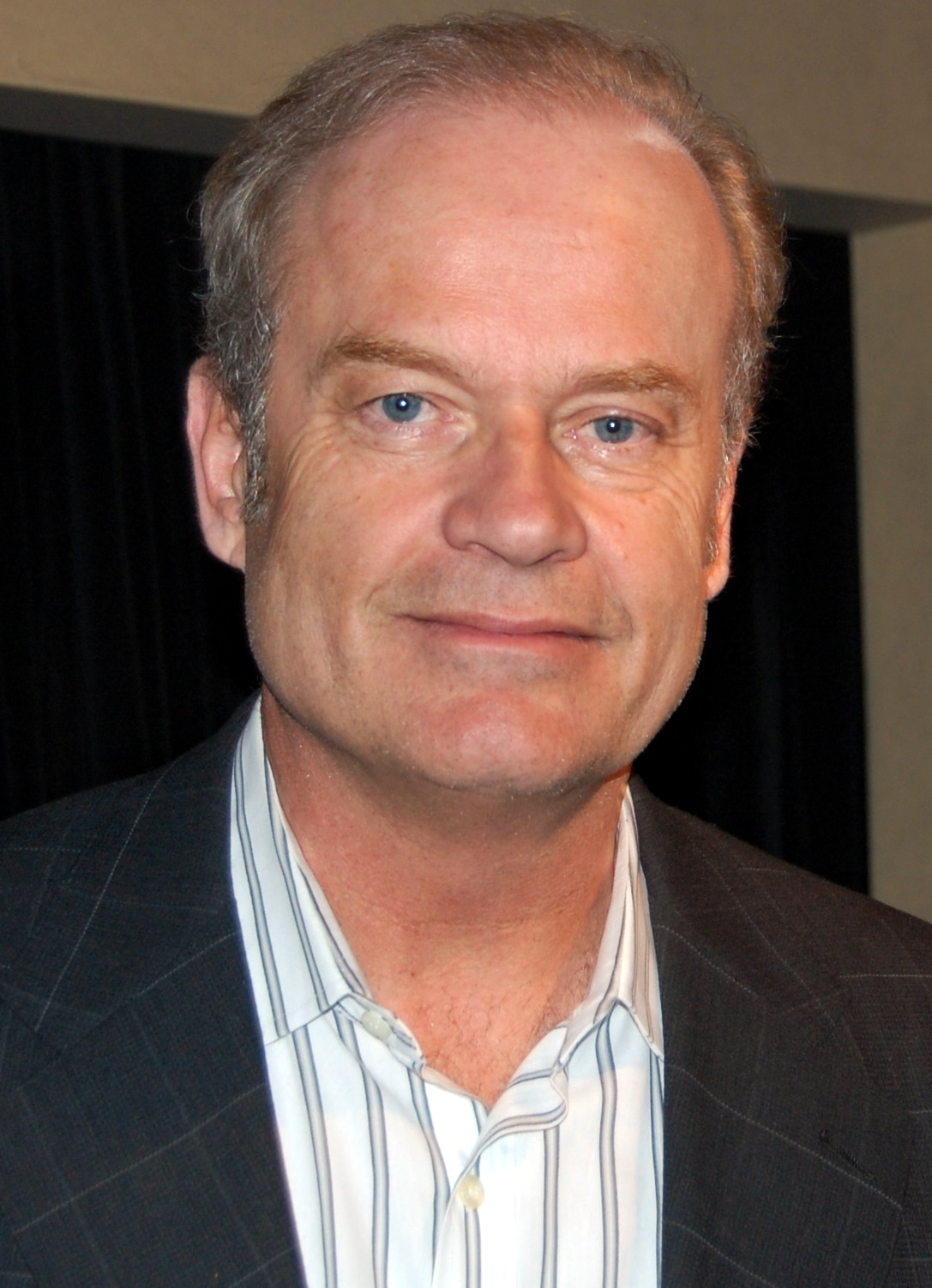
Kelsey Grammer, Outstanding Voice-Over Performance winner

Winners are listed first, highlighted in boldface, and indicated with a double dagger (‡). (Note: The outlets listed for each program are the U.S. broadcasters or streaming services identified in the nominations, which for some international productions are different than the broadcaster(s) that originally commissioned the program.) Sections are based upon the categories listed in the 2005–2006 Emmy rules and procedures. Area awards and juried awards are denoted next to the category names as applicable. (Note: Area awards are non-competitive and nominees are considered on their own terms. Any nominee with at least two-thirds approval received an Emmy. If no nominee received two-thirds approval, the nominee with the highest approval (and a minimum majority approval) received an Emmy.; Juried awards generally do not have nominations; instead, all entrants were screened before members of the appropriate peer group, and one, more than one, or no entry was awarded an Emmy based on the jury's vote.) For simplicity, producers who received nominations for program awards have been omitted.

=== Programs ===
Programs
**Outstanding Variety, Music or Comedy Special**: **The XX Olympic Winter Games – Opening Ceremony (NBC)**‡; 78th Annual Academy Awards (ABC); Bill Maher: I'm Swiss (HBO); George Carlin: Life Is Worth Losing (HBO); McCartney in St. Petersburg (A&E)	**Outstanding Special Class Program (Area)**: **Dance in America: Swan Lake with American Ballet Theatre (Great Performances) (PBS)**‡; Jazz at Lincoln Center – Higher Ground Hurricane Relief Benefit Concert (Live from Lincoln Center) (PBS); A Lincoln Center Special: 30 Years of Live from Lincoln Center (PBS); South Pacific in Concert from Carnegie Hall (Great Performances) (PBS)
**Outstanding Reality Program**: **Extreme Makeover: Home Edition (ABC)**‡; Antiques Roadshow (PBS); The Dog Whisperer (National Geographic); Kathy Griffin: My Life on the D-List (Bravo); Penn & Teller: Bullshit! (Showtime)	**Outstanding Children's Program (Area)**: **High School Musical (Disney)**‡; **I Have Tourette's but Tourette's Doesn't Have Me (HBO)**‡; Classical Baby 2 (HBO); Nick News with Linda Ellerbee: Do Something! Caring for the Kids of Katrina (Nickelodeon)
**Outstanding Animated Program (For Programming Less Than One Hour)**: **The Simpsons: "The Seemingly Never-Ending Story" (Fox)**‡; Camp Lazlo: "Hello Dolly" / "Over Cooked Beans" (Cartoon Network); Family Guy: "PTV" (Fox); Foster's Home for Imaginary Friends: "Go Goo Go" (Cartoon Network); South Park: "Trapped in the Closet" (Comedy Central)	**Outstanding Animated Program (For Programming One Hour or More) (Area)**: **Before the Dinosaurs (Discovery Channel)**‡; Escape from Cluster Prime (Nickelodeon)
**Outstanding Nonfiction Series (Area)**: **10 Days That Unexpectedly Changed America (The History Channel)**‡; American Masters (PBS); Biography (A&E); Deadliest Catch (Discovery Channel); Inside the Actors Studio (Bravo)	**Outstanding Nonfiction Special (Area)**: **Rome: Engineering an Empire (The History Channel)**‡; All Aboard! Rosie's Family Cruise (HBO); How William Shatner Changed the World (The History Channel); Inside 9/11 (National Geographic); Stardust: The Bette Davis Story (TCM)
**Exceptional Merit in Documentary Filmmaking (Juried)**: **Baghdad ER (HBO)**‡; **Two Days in October (American Experience) (PBS)**‡; Combat Diary: The Marines of Lima Company (A&E); In the Realms of the Unreal (P.O.V.) (PBS); Three Days in September (Showtime)	**Outstanding Achievement in Interactive Television (Juried)**: **TiVo** (Note: For Outstanding Achievement for Program Specific Enhanced or Interactive Television)‡; **ABC.com's full-episode streaming player** (Note: For Outstanding Achievement for Non-Program Specific Enhanced or Interactive Television for a Channel, Network or Service)‡

=== Performing ===
Performing
**Outstanding Guest Actor in a Comedy Series**: **Leslie Jordan – Will & Grace as Beverley Leslie (NBC)**‡; Alec Baldwin – Will & Grace as Malcolm (NBC); Martin Sheen – Two and a Half Men as Harvey (CBS); Patrick Stewart – Extras as himself (HBO); Ben Stiller – Extras as himself (HBO)	**Outstanding Guest Actress in a Comedy Series**: **Cloris Leachman – Malcolm in the Middle as Ida (Fox)**‡ (Episodes: “Bride of Ida” and “Graduation”); Blythe Danner – Will & Grace as Marilyn Truman (NBC); Shirley Knight – Desperate Housewives as Phyllis Van de Kamp (ABC); Laurie Metcalf – Monk as Cora (USA); Kate Winslet – Extras as herself (HBO)
**Outstanding Guest Actor in a Drama Series**: **Christian Clemenson – Boston Legal as Jerry "Hands" Espenson (ABC)**‡; Kyle Chandler – Grey's Anatomy as Dylan Young (ABC); Henry Ian Cusick – Lost as Desmond (ABC); Michael J. Fox – Boston Legal as Daniel Post (ABC); James Woods – ER as Dr. Nate Lennox (NBC)	**Outstanding Guest Actress in a Drama Series**: **Patricia Clarkson – Six Feet Under as Aunt Sarah (HBO)**‡; Kate Burton – Grey's Anatomy as Ellis Grey (ABC); Joanna Cassidy – Six Feet Under as Margaret Chenowith (HBO); Swoosie Kurtz – Huff as Madeline Sullivan (Showtime); Christina Ricci – Grey's Anatomy as Hannah (ABC)
**Outstanding Voice-Over Performance (Juried)**: **Kelsey Grammer – The Simpsons: "The Italian Bob" as Sideshow Bob (Fox)**‡

=== Animation ===
Animation
**Outstanding Individual Achievement in Animation (Juried)**
- **Classical Baby 2: "The Hippo Dance" – Jarek Szyszko (HBO)**‡
- **Escape from Cluster Prime – Bryan Arnett (Nickelodeon)**‡
- **Foster's Home for Imaginary Friends: "Go Goo Go" – Shannon Tindle (Cartoon Network)**‡
- **The Grim Adventures of Billy & Mandy – Mike Diederich (Cartoon Network)**‡
- **The Life and Times of Juniper Lee: "Adventures in Babysitting" – Frederick Gardner (Cartoon Network)**‡
- **Robot Chicken: "Easter Basket" – Sarah E. Meyer (Cartoon Network)**‡

=== Art Direction ===
Art Direction
**Outstanding Art Direction for a Multi-Camera Series**: **How I Met Your Mother: "Pilot" – Stephan Olson and Richard C. Walker (CBS)**‡; Stacked: "iPod" – Bernard Vyzga and Mark Johnson (Fox); Will & Grace: "I Love L. Gay" – Glenda Rovello and Melinda Ritz (NBC)	**Outstanding Art Direction for a Single-Camera Series**: **Rome: "Caesarion" / "Triumph" / "Kalends of February" – Joseph Bennett, Domenico Sica, and Cristina Onori (HBO)**‡; Desperate Housewives: "There's Something About a War" – Thomas A. Walsh, P. Erik Carlson, and Erica Rogalla (ABC); House: "Autopsy" / "Distractions" / "Skin Deep" – Derek R. Hill and Danielle Berman (Fox); Nip/Tuck: "Ben White" – Liz Kay and Ellen Brill (FX); Six Feet Under: "Hold My Hand" / "Singing for Our Lives" / "Everyone's Waiting" – Suzuki Ingerslev, Kristan Andrews, and Rusty Lipscomb (HBO)
**Outstanding Art Direction for a Miniseries or Movie (Area)**: **Elizabeth I – Eve Stewart, Leon McCarthy, and Sarah Whittle (HBO)**‡; Bleak House (Masterpiece Theatre) – Simon Elliot and Bill Crutcher (PBS); The Girl in the Café – Candida Otton and Andrea Coathupe (HBO); Into the West – Marek Dobrowolski, Rick Roberts, Guy Barnes, Paul Healy, and Wendy Ozols-Barnes (TNT); Stephen King's Desperation – Philip Dagort, Jason Weil, and Marcia Calosio (ABC)	**Outstanding Art Direction for a Variety, Music Program, or Special (Area)**: **78th Annual Academy Awards – Roy Christopher and Greg Richman (ABC)**‡; American Idol: "Episode 519" – Andy Walmsley and James Yarnell (Fox); Dancing with the Stars: "Episode 206" – Patrick Doherty and James Yarnell (ABC); MADtv: "Episode 1115" – John Sabato, D Martyn Bookwalter, and Daryn Reid Goodall (Fox); Rome: Engineering an Empire – Vincent Kralyevich (The History Channel)

=== Casting ===
Casting
**Outstanding Casting for a Comedy Series**: **My Name Is Earl – Dava Waite Peaslee (NBC)**‡; Desperate Housewives – Junie Lowry Johnson and Scott Genkinger (ABC); Entourage – Sheila Jaffe, Georgianne Walken, and Meredith Tucker (HBO); Weeds – Amy McIntyre Britt and Anya Colloff (Showtime)	**Outstanding Casting for a Drama Series**: **Grey's Anatomy – Linda Lowy and John Brace (ABC)**‡; Big Love – Junie Lowry Johnson and Libby Goldstein (HBO); Boston Legal – Ken Miller and Nikki Valko (ABC); House – Amy Lippens and Stephanie Laffin (Fox); Lost – April Webster, Veronica Collins Rooney, and Mandy Sherman (ABC)
**Outstanding Casting for a Miniseries, Movie or a Special**: **Elizabeth I – Doreen Jones (HBO)**‡; The Girl in the Café – Fiona Weir (HBO); High School Musical – Jason LaPadura and Natalie Hart (Disney); Into the West – Meg Liberman, Cami Patton, Rene Haynes, Candice Elzinga, Rhonda Fisekci, and Jo Edna Boldin (TNT); Mrs. Harris – Junie Lowry Johnson and Libby Goldstein (HBO)

=== Choreography ===
Choreography
**Outstanding Choreography (Area)**
- **High School Musical – Kenny Ortega, Charles Klapow, and Bonnie Story (Disney)**‡
  - Dancing with the Stars: "Episode #204" – Nick Kosovich and Cheryl Burke (ABC)
  - Dancing with the Stars: "Episode #208" – Cheryl Burke (ABC)
  - Dancing with the Stars: "Episode #208" – Tony Dovolani (ABC)
  - Malcolm in the Middle: "Bomb Shelter" – Fred Tallaksen (Fox)
  - The Suite Life of Zack & Cody: "Commercial Breaks" – Travis Payne (Disney)

=== Cinematography ===
Cinematography
**Outstanding Cinematography for a Multi-Camera Series**: **How I Met Your Mother: "The Limo" – Christian La Fountaine (CBS)**‡; According to Jim: "Mr. Right" – George Mooradian (ABC); The New Adventures of Old Christine: "Open Water" – Gregg Heschong (CBS); Reba: "The Goodbye Guy" – Bryan Hays (WB); Two and a Half Men: "Carpet Burns and a Bite Mark" – Steven V. Silver (CBS)	**Outstanding Cinematography for a Single-Camera Series**: **CSI: Crime Scene Investigation: "Gum Drops" – Michael Slovis (CBS)**‡; Everybody Hates Chris: "Everybody Hates Funerals" – Mark Doering-Powell (UPN); Lost: "Man of Science, Man of Faith" – Michael Bonvillain (ABC); The Sopranos: "The Ride" – Phil Abraham (HBO); 24: "9:00 PM – 10:00 PM" – Rodney Charters (Fox)
**Outstanding Cinematography for a Miniseries or Movie**: **Bleak House (Masterpiece Theatre): "Episode 1" – Kieran McGuigan (PBS)**‡; Four Minutes – James Chressanthis (ESPN2); Into the West: "Dreams and Schemes" – William Wages (TNT); Into the West: "Wheel to the Stars" – Alan Caso (TNT); Mrs. Harris – Steven Poster (HBO); Sleeper Cell: "Al-Fatiha" – Robert Primes (Showtime)	**Outstanding Cinematography for Nonfiction Programming (Single-Camera Productions)**: **Baghdad ER – Jon Alpert and Matthew O'Neill (HBO)**‡; All Aboard! Rosie's Family Cruise – Maryse Alberti, Sandra Chandler, and Beth Wichterich (HBO); Children of Beslan – Dirk Nel (HBO); I Have Tourette's but Tourette's Doesn't Have Me – Buddy Squires (HBO); Rome: Engineering an Empire – Jeremiah Crowell (The History Channel)
**Outstanding Cinematography for Nonfiction Programming (Multi-Camera Productions)**: **The Amazing Race: "Here Comes the Bedouin!" – Per A. C. Larsson, Sylvester Campe, Tom Cunningham, Chip Goebert, Uri Sharon, and Scott Shelley (CBS)**‡; The Apprentice: "Episode #509" – Jim Harrington, Alan Pierce, Jeff Watt, Rodney Chauvin, Tom Magill, and Vince Monteleone (NBC); Deadliest Catch: "The Clock's Ticking" – Doug Stanley, Scott Simper, Patrick Cummings, Zac McFarlane, Marc Carter, and Bryan Miller (Discovery Channel); Project Runway: "Clothes Off Your Back" – Tony Sacco (Bravo); Survivor: "Big Trek, Big Trouble, Big Surprise" – Mark "Ninja" Lynch, Michael Murray, Mark Hryma, Derek Carver, Leighton DeBarros, and Kevin Garrison (CBS)

=== Commercial ===
Commercial
**Outstanding Commercial**
- **"Required Reading" – The Institute for the Development of Enhanced Perceptual Awareness and Leo Burnett Chicago (Hallmark)**‡
- **"Stick" – Partizan and BBDO New York (FedEx)**‡
  - "Clydesdale American Dream" – PYTKA and DDB Chicago (Budweiser)
  - "Concert" – MJZ and DDB Los Angeles (Ameriquest)

=== Costumes ===
Costumes
**Outstanding Costumes for a Series**: **Rome: "Triumph" – April Ferry and Augusto Grassi (HBO)**‡; Battlestar Galactica: "Lay Down Your Burdens, Part 2" – Glenne Campbell, Glenna Owen, and Cali Newcomen (Sci Fi Channel); Desperate Housewives: "Next" – Catherine Adair, Joyce Goodwin, and Karo Vartanian (ABC); Everybody Hates Chris: "Everybody Hates the Pilot" – Darryle Johnson and Shirlene Williams (UPN); The Sopranos: "Mr. & Mrs. John Sacrimoni Request..." – Juliet Polcsa, Joseph La Corte, and Elizabeth Feldbauer (HBO)	**Outstanding Costumes for a Miniseries, Movie or a Special**: **Elizabeth I: "Part 2" – Mike O'Neill and Samantha Horn (HBO)**‡; Bleak House (Masterpiece Theatre): "Episode 1" – Andrea Galer and Charlotte Morris (PBS); Into the West: "Hell on Wheels" – Michael T. Boyd and Joe McCloskey (TNT); Mrs. Harris – Julie Weiss and Elaine Ramires (HBO); Once Upon a Mattress – Bob Mackie, Chris Hargadon, and Dawn Leigh Climie (ABC)
**Outstanding Costumes for a Variety or Music Program (Juried)**: **Benise: Nights of Fire! – Erin Lareau (PBS)**‡; **Dancing with the Stars: "Episode 208A" – Dana Campbell and Randall Christensen (ABC)**‡; **MADtv: "Episode #1109" – Wendy Benbrook and Wanda Leavey (Fox)**‡

=== Directing ===
Directing
**Outstanding Directing for Nonfiction Programming**
- **Baghdad ER – Jon Alpert and Matthew O'Neill (HBO)**‡
  - All Aboard! Rosie's Family Cruise – Shari Cookson (HBO)
  - American Masters: "Bob Dylan: No Direction Home" – Martin Scorsese (PBS)
  - American Masters: "John Ford/John Wayne: The Filmmaker and the Legend" – Sam Pollard (PBS)
  - Children of Beslan – Ewa Ewart and Leslie Woodhead (HBO)

=== Hairstyling ===
Hairstyling
**Outstanding Hairstyling for a Series**: **Rome: "Stealing from Saturn" – Aldo Signoretti, Ferdinando Merolla, Stefano Ceccarelli, and Gaetano Panico (HBO)**‡; Alias: "There's Only One Sydney Bristow" – Michael Reitz, Katherine Rees, and Shimmy Osman (ABC); Desperate Housewives: "Remember" – Dena Green, Gabor Heiligenberg, Nicole Frank, and James Dunham (ABC); Six Feet Under: "Everyone's Waiting" – Randy Sayer, Miia Kovero, Karl Wesson, and Daphne Lawson (HBO); Will & Grace: "The Finale" – Luke O'Connor and Tim Burke (NBC)	**Outstanding Hairstyling for a Miniseries, Movie or a Special**: **Elizabeth I: "Part 2" – Fae Hammond and Su Westwood (HBO)**‡; Into the West: "Casualties of War" – Mary Lampert and Jennifer Santiago (TNT); Into the West: "Manifest Destiny" – Iloe Flewelling (TNT); Mrs. Harris – Bunny Parker, Susan Schuler, and Elle Elliot (HBO)

=== Lighting Direction ===
Lighting Direction
**Outstanding Lighting Direction (Electronic, Multi-Camera) for Variety, Music or Comedy Programming**
- **2005 American Music Awards – Olin Younger and Harry Sangmeister (ABC)**‡
  - 78th Annual Academy Awards – Robert A. Dickinson, Robert Barnhart, and Andy O'Reilly (ABC)
  - American Idol: "American Classics Songbook with Rod Stewart" – Kieran Healy, Eli McKinney, and George Harvey (Fox)
  - American Idol: "Finale" – Kieran Healy, Harry Sangmeister, and George Harvey (Fox)
  - Late Night with Conan O'Brien: "Episode #2226" – Fred Bock (NBC)

=== Main Title Design ===
Main Title Design
**Outstanding Main Title Design**
- **78th Annual Academy Awards – Alen Petkovic, Jon Teschner, Renato Grgic, and Kristijan Petrovic (ABC)**‡
  - Big Love – Angus Wall, Maurice Marable, Kirk Baxter, and Larry Ewing (HBO)
  - Ghost Whisperer – Paul Matthaeus, Erin Sarofsky, Anthony Vitagliano, and Shangyu Yin (CBS)
  - Rome – Angus Wall, Kirks Balden, Brad Waskewich, and Andrew Hall (HBO)
  - The Triangle – Garson Yu, Yolanda Santosa, Robert Cribbett, and Nate Homan (Sci Fi Channel)
  - Weeds – Thomas Cobb and Robert Bradley (Showtime)

=== Makeup ===
Makeup
**Outstanding Makeup for a Series (Non-Prosthetic)**: **Black. White.: "Hour One" – Brian Sipe, Keith VanderLaan, and Will Huff (FX)**‡; CSI: NY: "Wasted" – Perri Sorel, Rela Martine-Gray, James MacKinnon, and John Goodwin (CBS); Grey's Anatomy: "Owner of a Lonely Heart" – Norman Leavitt, Brigitte Bugayong, Tom Burman, and Bari Dreiband-Burman (ABC); MADtv: "Episode 1109" – Jennifer Aspinall, Nathalie Fratti, Heather Mages, and David Williams (Fox); Nip/Tuck: "Quentin Costa" – Eryn Krueger, Stephanie Fowler, Debbie Zoller, and Michele Tyminski (FX); Rome: "Caesarion" – Maurizio Silvi, Federico Laurenti, Francesco Nardi, and Laura Tonello (HBO); Will & Grace: "The Finale" – Patty Bunch, Karen Kawahara, Farah Bunch, and Greg Cannom (NBC)	**Outstanding Makeup for a Miniseries, Movie or a Special (Non-Prosthetic)**: **Bleak House (Masterpiece Theatre) – Daniel Phillips (PBS)**‡; Into the West: "Ghost Dance" – Tarra Day (TNT); Into the West: "Wheel to the Stars" – Gail Kennedy (TNT); Mrs. Harris – Tina Roesler Kerwin, Elisa Marsh, Julie Hewett, and Michele Baylis (HBO); The Ten Commandments – Michele Baylis, Khalid Alami, Angie Mudge, and Jennifer Harty (ABC)
**Outstanding Prosthetic Makeup for a Series, Miniseries, Movie or a Special (Area)**: **Six Feet Under: "Everyone's Waiting" – Matthew W. Mungle, Michelle Vittone McNeil, John E. Jackson, and Clinton Wayne (HBO)**‡; Grey's Anatomy: "Yesterday" – Norman Leavitt, Brigitte Bugayong, Tom Burman, and Bari Dreiband-Burman (ABC); Into the West: "Wheel to the Stars" – Gail Kennedy and Matthew W. Mungle (TNT); MADtv: "Episode 1117" – Jennifer Aspinall, Heather Mages, Wade Daily, Douglas Noe, James Rohland, and David Williams (Fox); Nip/Tuck: "Cherry Peck" – Eryn Krueger, Stephanie Fowler, Tom Burman, and Bari Dreiband-Burman (FX)

=== Music ===
Music
**Outstanding Music Composition for a Series (Original Dramatic Score)**: **24: "6:00 AM – 7:00 AM" – Sean Callery (Fox)**‡; Masters of Horror: "Dreams in the Witch House" – Richard Band (Showtime); Rome: "Triumph" – Jeff Beal (HBO); Stargate: Atlantis: "Grace Under Pressure" – Joel Goldsmith (Sci Fi Channel); Supernatural: "Pilot" – Christopher Lennertz (WB)	**Outstanding Music Composition for a Miniseries, Movie or a Special (Original Dramatic Score)**: **Into the West – Geoff Zanelli (TNT)**‡; The Dive from Clausen's Pier – Bruce Broughton (Lifetime); Human Trafficking: "Part 1" – Normand Corbeil (Lifetime); Sleeper Cell – Paul Haslinger (Showtime); The Water Is Wide (Hallmark Hall of Fame Presentation) – Jeff Beal (CBS)
**Outstanding Music Direction**: **South Pacific in Concert from Carnegie Hall (Great Performances) – Paul Gemignani (PBS)**‡; 78th Annual Academy Awards – Bill Conti (ABC); Andrea Bocelli: Amore Under the Desert Sky (Great Performances) – David Foster (PBS); The Kennedy Center Honors – Elliot Lawrence and Rob Mathes (CBS); The 59th Annual Tony Awards – Elliot Lawrence (CBS)	**Outstanding Original Music and Lyrics**: **MADtv: "Episode 1111" – "A Wonderfully Normal Day" by Greg O'Connor and Jim Wise (Fox)**‡; Gideon's Daughter – "Natasha's Song" by Stephen Poliakoff and Adrian Johnston (BBC America); High School Musical – "Breaking Free" by Jamie Houston (Disney); High School Musical – "Get'cha Head in the Game" by Ray Cham, Greg Cham, and Andrew Seeley (Disney); Once Upon a Mattress – "That Baby of Mine" by Ken Welch and Mitzie Welch (ABC)
**Outstanding Original Main Title Theme Music**: **Masters of Horror – Edward Shearmur (Showtime)**‡; Get Ed – Amin Bhatia and Ari Posner (Toon Disney); Over There – Chris Gerolmo (FX); Prison Break – Ramin Djawadi (Fox); Rome – Jeff Beal (HBO)

=== Picture Editing ===
Picture Editing
**Outstanding Single-Camera Picture Editing for a Drama Series**: **24: "7:00 AM – 8:00 AM" – David Latham (Fox)**‡; Boston Legal: "Race Ipsa" – Philip Neel (ABC); Lost: "Live Together, Die Alone (Part 1 & 2)" – Sue Blainey, Stephen Semel, and Sarah Boyd (ABC); Lost: "One of Them" – Sarah Boyd (ABC); 24: "9:00 AM – 10:00 AM" – Scott Powell (Fox)	**Outstanding Single-Camera Picture Editing for a Comedy Series**: **My Name Is Earl: "Ruined Joy's Wedding" – Lance Luckey (NBC)**‡; Arrested Development: "The Ocean Walker" – Stuart Bass (Fox); Curb Your Enthusiasm: "The Ski Lift" – Steve Rasch (HBO); Desperate Housewives: "That's Good, That's Bad" – Nancy Morrison (ABC); The Office: "Booze Cruise" – Dean Holland (NBC); The Office: "Christmas Party" – David Rogers; Weeds: "Good Shit Lollipop" – David Helfand (Showtime)
**Outstanding Single-Camera Picture Editing for a Miniseries or a Movie**: **Elizabeth I: "Part 1" – Beverley Mills (HBO)**‡; Elizabeth I: "Part 2" – Melanie Oliver (HBO); Flight 93 – Scott Boyd (A&E); The Girl in the Café – Mark Day (HBO); The Ten Commandments – Mark Conte, Ingrid Koller, Klaus Hundsbichler, and Victor Dubois (ABC)	**Outstanding Multi-Camera Picture Editing for a Series**: **Two and a Half Men: "That Special Tug" – Joe Bella (CBS)**‡; Late Night with Conan O'Brien: "Episode #2198" – Katherine Babiak, Mark Jankeloff, Liz Gross, and Vic Fabilli (NBC); Late Show with David Letterman: "Show #2519" – Mark Spada, Andrew Evangelista, Steve Hostomsky, Tom Catusi, James Alkins, and Mona Lu (CBS); That '70s Show: "We Will Rock You" – Michael Karlich (Fox); Will & Grace: "The Finale" – Peter Chakos (NBC)
**Outstanding Picture Editing for a Special (Single or Multi-Camera)**: **The Kennedy Center Honors – Mike Polito, John Zimmer, Cathy Shields, and Anny Meza (CBS)**‡; 78th Annual Academy Awards – Douglass M. Stewart Jr., June Beallor, Chuck Workman, Michael J. Shapiro, Troy Miller, Jon Bloom, and Mike Polito (ABC); Bill Maher: I'm Swiss – El Armstrong and Sara Aderhold (HBO); A Concert for Hurricane Relief – Rico Bolognino, Paul Musilli, Barry Spitzer, and Sean Sohl (NBC); Dance in America: Swan Lake with American Ballet Theatre – Girish Bhargava (PBS); The XX Olympic Winter Games – Opening Ceremony – Howard Tate, Don Vermeulen Jr., Rachel Pillar, Patrice Freymond, and Jim O'Farrell (NBC)	**Outstanding Picture Editing for Nonfiction Programming (Small Team Entries)**: **Rome: Engineering an Empire – Jennifer P. Honn (The History Channel)**‡; AFI's 100 Years...100 Movie Quotes – Tim Preston, Debra Light, and Barry A. O'Brien (CBS); American Masters: "Bob Dylan: No Direction Home" – David Tedeschi (PBS); American Masters: "John Ford/John Wayne: The Filmmaker and the Legend" – Steven Wechsler (PBS); Baghdad ER – Patrick McMahon and Carrie Goldman (HBO); Penn & Teller: Bullshit!: "Prostitution" – Steven Uhlenberg (Showtime)
**Outstanding Picture Editing for Nonfiction Programming (Large Team Entries)**: **The Amazing Race: "Here Comes the Bedouin!" – Matt Deitrich, Michael Bolanowski, Evan Finn, Eric Goldfarb, Julian Gomez, Andy Kozar, and Paul Nielsen (CBS)**‡; American Idol: "Audition City: Greensboro" – Bill De Ronde, Barnaby Levy, Cliff Dorsey, Ryan Tanner, Oren Castro, and Narumi Inatsugu (Fox); Project Runway: "Clothes Off Your Back" – Steve Lichtenstein, Clark Vogeler, Joe Mastromonaco, LaRonda Morris, Drew Brown, and Noel Guerra (Bravo); Survivor: "Salvation and Desertion" – Ivan Ladizinsky, Tim Atzinger, Fred Hawthorne, Conroy Browne, and Evan Mediuch (CBS); Survivor: "Starvation and Lunacy" – Michael Greer, H. A. Arnarson, Fred Hawthorne, J. D. Sievertson, Tim Atzinger, Evan Mediuch, and Dave Harrison (CBS)

=== Sound Editing ===
Sound Editing
**Outstanding Sound Editing for a Series**: **Smallville: "Arrival" – Michael Lawshe, Timothy Cleveland, Paul Diller, Stuart Calderon, Jason Oliver, Jessica Dickson, David Cowan, Chris McGeary, Casey Crabtree, and Michael Crabtree (WB)**‡; CSI: Crime Scene Investigation: "A Bullet Runs Through It, Part 1" – Mace Matiosian, Ruth Adelman, David Van Slyke, Jivan Tahmizian, Mark Allen, Troy Hardy, Zane Bruce, and Joseph Sabella (CBS); ER: "Two Ships" – Walter Newman, Tom Harris, Darleen Stoker, Rick M. Hromadka, Darren Wright, Kenneth Young, Bruce Honda, Sharyn Tylk-Gersh, Casey Crabtree, and Michael Crabtree (NBC); Supernatural: "Pilot" – Michael Lawshe, Timothy Cleveland, Paul Diller, Marc Meyer, David Lynch, Jessica Dickson, Karyn Foster, Chris McGeary, David Lee Fein, and Jody Thomas (WB); 24: "9:00 PM – 10:00 PM" – William Dotson, Catherine Speakman, Pembrooke Andrews, Jeffrey Whitcher, Shawn Kennelly, Rick Polanco, Jeffrey Charbonneau, Laura Macias, and Vince Nicastro (Fox)	**Outstanding Sound Editing for a Miniseries, Movie or a Special**: **Flight 93 – Harry Snodgrass, Mark Linden, Tara A. Paul, David A. Sharf, Geoff Raffan, Carlos Ramirez, Joan Rowe, and Chris Julian (A&E)**‡; Category 7: The End of the World: "Night 1" – Joseph Melody, Devon Curry, Kevin Fisher, Rick Steele, Anton Holden, Joy Ealy, J. Michael Hooser, Burt Weinstein, Tim Terusa, Mark Steele, Sean Byrne, Peter DiRado, Tim Chilton, and Sharon Michaels (CBS); Into the West: "Manifest Destiny" – Michael Graham, Kristi Johns, Bill Bell, Bob Costanza, Mike Dickeson, Gary Macheel, Lou Thomas, Adriane Marfiak, Anton Holden, Burt Weinstein, Tim Terusa, Charles Kolander, Rusty Tinsley, Jim Schultz, Jill Sanders, and Tim Chilton (TNT); Sleeper Cell: "Youmud-Din" – Mark Kamps, Todd Murakami, Jane Boegel, Jason Lezama, Patrick Hogan, Bob Newlan, Matt Fausak, and Dale Perry (Showtime); Stephen King's Desperation – Richard Taylor, Todd Murakami, Jason Lezama, Andrew Ellerd, Bob Costanza, Brian Thomas Nist, Patrick Hogan, Mark Cookson, Mark Kamps, Robert Ramirez, Fred Judkins, Rick Steele, Sonya Lindsay, and Stan Jones (ABC)
**Outstanding Sound Editing for Nonfiction Programming (Single or Multi-Camera)**: **Baghdad ER – Lila Yomtoob (HBO)**‡; The Amazing Race: "Here Comes the Bedouin!" – Matt Deitrich, Mike Bolanowski, Evan Finn, Eric Goldfarb, Julian Gomez, Andy Kozar, Paul Nielsen, and Rick Livingstone (CBS); American Masters: "Bob Dylan: No Direction Home" – Philip Stockton, Allan Zaleski, Frederic Rosenberg, Jennifer Dunnington, and Annette Kudrak (PBS); Survivor: "Big Trek, Big Trouble, Big Surprise" – Ryan Owens, Mark Jasper, Vince Tennant, Matt Slivinski, Glen Frazier, Rick Livingstone, Michael Brake, and Monique Reymond (CBS); Two Days in October (American Experience) – Jack Levy, Daniel Colman, Vince Balunas, Jeff Brunello, Kim Roberts, and Doug Madick (PBS)

=== Sound Mixing ===
Sound Mixing
**Outstanding Single-Camera Sound Mixing for a Series**: **Boston Legal: "Finding Nimmo" – Craig Hunter, Peter R. Kelsey, Clark King, and William Butler (ABC)**‡; Battlestar Galactica: "Scattered" – Kenneth Kobett, Michael Olman, and Rick Bal (Sci Fi Channel); CSI: Crime Scene Investigation: "A Bullet Runs Through It" – Yuri Reese, Bill Smith, and Mick Fowler (CBS); House: "Euphoria, Part 1" – Gerry Lentz, Richard Weingart, and Russell C. Fager (Fox); Lost: "Live Together, Die Alone (Part 2)" – David Barr Yaffe, Sean Rush, Frank Morrone, and Scott Weber (ABC); 24: "7:00 AM – 8:00 AM" – Michael Olman, Kenneth Kobett, and Bill Gocke (Fox)	**Outstanding Single-Camera Sound Mixing for a Miniseries or a Movie**: **Into the West: "Dreams and Schemes" – George Tarrant, Rick Alexander, and Richard Rogers (TNT)**‡; Elizabeth I: "Part 1" – Ken Campbell and Paul Hamblin (HBO); Flight 93 – Mark Linden, Tara A. Paul, Liam Lockhart, and Harry Snodgrass (A&E); Into the West: "Hell on Wheels" – Bayard Carey, Rick Alexander, and Richard Rogers (TNT); Sleeper Cell: "Youmud-Din" – Elmo Ponsdomenech, Joe Earle, and Roger Pietschmann (Showtime); The Ten Commandments: "Part II" – Alistair Crocker, Terry O'Bright, and Keith Rogers (ABC)
**Outstanding Multi-Camera Sound Mixing for a Series or Special**: **The West Wing: "The Debate" – Edward J. Greene and Andrew Strauber (NBC)**‡; Two and a Half Men: "The Unfortunate Little Schnauzer" – Bruce Peters, Charlie McDaniel, Kathy Oldham, and Bob La Masney (CBS)	**Outstanding Sound Mixing for a Variety or Music Series or Special or Animation (Area)**: **78th Annual Academy Awards – Edward J. Greene, Tom Vicari, Patrick Baltzell, Robert Douglass, and Jamie Santos (ABC)**‡; **Eagles Farewell I Tour – Live from Melbourne – Elliot Scheiner and Sue Pelino (NBC)**‡; American Idol: "American Classics Songbook with Rod Stewart" – Edward J. Greene, Andrew Fletcher, Paul Sandweiss, Brian Riordan, and Conner Moore (Fox); Barry Manilow: Music and Passion – Tom Davis, John Zvolensky, and Steve Johnson (PBS); 48th Annual Grammy Awards – Tom Holmes, John Harris, Eric Schilling, Don Worsham, Mikael Stewart, Ron Reaves, Paul Sandweiss, and Bob La Masney (CBS)
**Outstanding Sound Mixing for Nonfiction Programming (Single or Multi-Camera)**: **American Masters: "Bob Dylan: No Direction Home" – Tom Fleischman (PBS)**‡; The Amazing Race: "Here Comes the Bedouin!" – Troy Smith, Jim Ursulak, Jerry Chabane, and Peter Jones (CBS); Baghdad ER – Jon Alpert, Matthew O'Neill, and Paul Hsu (HBO); Deadliest Catch: "The Clock's Ticking" – Bob Bronow (Discovery Channel); Survivor: "Big Trek, Big Trouble, Big Surprise" – Terrance Dwyer, Jeremy Ireland, Matthias Hoffman, Tony Jensen, and Terry Meehan (CBS)

=== Special Visual Effects ===
Special Visual Effects
**Outstanding Special Visual Effects for a Series**: **Rome: "The Stolen Eagle" – Barrie Hemsley, James Madigan, Joe Pavlo, Duncan Kinnaird, Dan Pettipher, Michele Sciolette, Charles Darby, Clare Herbert, and Anna Panton (HBO)**‡; Battlestar Galactica: "Resurrection Ship (Part 2)" – Gary Hutzel, Michael Gibson, Doug Drexler, Steve Kullback, Mark Shimer, Chris Zapara, Lane Jolly, Kyle Toucher, and Daniel Osaki (Sci Fi Channel); Lost: "Live Together, Die Alone (Part 1 & 2)" – Kevin Blank, Mitch Suskin, Jay Worth, Scott Dewis, Steve Fong, Spencer Levy, Eric Chauvin, Archie Ahuna, and Bob Lloyd (ABC); Perfect Disaster: "Super Tornado" – Gareth Edwards and Bob Trevino (Discovery Channel); Surface: "Episode #101" – Mitch Suskin, Dave Morton, Eric Hance, John Teska, Pierre Drolet, Eric Chauvin, Steve Fong, and Neal Sopata (NBC)	**Outstanding Special Visual Effects for a Miniseries, Movie or a Special**: **The Triangle: "Part 1" – Marc Weigert, Volker Engel, Ingo Putze, Robin Graham, Todd Sheridan Perry, Conrad Murrey, Sam Khorshid, Paul Graff, and Ben Grossmann (Sci Fi Channel)**‡; Before the Dinosaurs – Tim Greenwood, Neil Glasbey, Chloe Leland, Nigel Booth, Jeremy Hunt, Daren Horley, Peter Thorn, and Darren Byford (Discovery Channel); Into the West: "Hell on Wheels" – Tim McHugh, Craig Weiss, Glenn Campbell, Christopher DeCristo, Christopher Moore, Niel Wray, Don L. McCoy, George Garcia, and Eric Ehemann (TNT); Mammoth – Armen Kevorkian, Liz Castro, Matt Scharf, David Morton, Christian Bloch, Stefan Bredereck, Jason Zimmerman, Spencer Levy, and Scott Dewis (Sci Fi Channel); The Nightingale (Great Performances) – Hugues Namur, Paul Carteron, Morgan Sagel, Anne Chatelain, Oliver Garcelon, Alexander Gregoire, Guillaume Ho Tsong Fang, Ugo Bimar, and Julien Limouse (PBS)

=== Stunt Coordination ===
Stunt Coordination
**Outstanding Stunt Coordination**
- **E-Ring: "Snatch and Grab" – Jimmy Romano (NBC)**‡
  - Alias: "Reprisal (Part 1)" / "All the Time in the World (Part 2)" – Shauna Duggins (ABC)
  - Numb3rs: "Harvest" – Jim Vickers (CBS)
  - 24: "9:00 PM – 10:00 PM" – Jeff Cadiente (Fox)
  - The Unit: "First Responders" – Norman Howell (CBS)

=== Technical Direction ===
Technical Direction
**Outstanding Technical Direction, Camerawork, Video for a Series**: **Dancing with the Stars: "Episode #204" – John Pritchett, Brian Reason, Hector Ramirez, Dave Levisohn, John Repczynski, Danny Bonilla, Easter Xua, Diane Biederbeck, Suzanne Ebner, James Karidas, and Chris Gray (ABC)**‡; American Idol: "Episode #530" – John Pritchett, Diane Biederbeck, Danny Bonilla, Manny Bonilla, Dave Eastwood, Suzanne Ebner, Bobby Highton, Ed Horton, Steve Martynuik, Ken Patterson, George Prince, John Repczynski, Easter Xua, Diane Biederbeck, Suzanne Ebner, James Karidas, and Mark Sanford (Fox); Late Night with Conan O'Brien: "Episode #2226" – Gregory Aull, Richard S. Carter, Kenneth Decker, Kurt Decker, Eugene Huelsman, Gregory Kasoff, Chris Matott, James Palczewski, James Scurti, Mark Sofil, Eli Clarke, Carl M. Henry III, and Keith Winikoff (NBC); Late Show with David Letterman: "Show #2472" – Timothy W. Kennedy, Al Cialino, David J. Dorsett, Karin-Lucie Grzella, Jack W. Young, John Hannel, John Curtin, George Rothweiler, Dan Flaherty, Fred Shimizu, Steven G. Kaufman, John Pry, Kevin Bailey, William J. White, and Daniel L. Campbell (CBS); Saturday Night Live: "Host: Jack Black, Musical Guest Neil Young" – Steven Cimino, John Pinto, Richard B. Fox, Brian Phraner, Michael Bennett, Eric A. Eisenstein, John Rosenblatt, Gene Huelsman, Susan Noll, and Frank Grisanti (NBC)	**Outstanding Technical Direction, Camerawork, Video for a Miniseries, Movie or a Special**: **The XX Olympic Winter Games – Opening Ceremony – Robert LaMacchia, Cody Alexander, Dan Beard, Joe Debonis, Kenneth Decker, Eric A. Eisenstein, Rick Fox Jr., Sal Guarna, Mike Harvath, Terry Hester, Igor Klobas, Richie Leible Jr., Tore Livia, Jon Mantak, Chris Matott, Robert Mikkelson, Brian Phraner, John Pinto, Marc Tippy, Nick Utley, James Wachter, Harry Weisman, Mike Wimberley, Ken Woo, John Murphy, and Jerrold Hochman (NBC)**‡; 78th Annual Academy Awards – John B. Field, Kenneth Shapiro, Allan Wells, Ted Ashton, Robert Balton, John Burdick, David Eastwood, Marc Hunter, Charlie Huntley, Dave Levisohn, Jay Millard, Lyn Noland, Rob Palmer, Bill Philbin, David Plakos, Hector Ramirez, Brian Reason, Mark Whitman, Kris Wilson, Bret Crutcher, Aaron Fitzgerald, Dean Hall, Easter Xua, Mark Sanford, Keith Winikoff, and Chuck Reilly (ABC); Andrea Bocelli: Amore Under the Desert Sky (Great Performances) – Allan Wells, Randy Baer, Bill Chaikowsky, Ken Dahlquist, Hank Geving, Manny Guitierrez, Larry Heider, Pat Kerby, Ken Patterson, Gordie Saiger, Rob Vuona, Daniel Webb, Easter Xua, Billy Steinberg, and Steve Rice (PBS); Elton John: The Red Piano – Chuck Reilly, Barrie Dodd, Andy Watt, James Ramsay, Derek Pennell, Paul Freeman, Tom Geren, Kenny Patterson, David Plakos, Daniel Webb, Ted Ashton, Hector Ramirez, Gordie Saiger, David Eastwood, John Repczynski, Robert Palmer, Harry Skip Eppley, Chris Methven, and Guy Jones (NBC); NFL Opening Kickoff 2005 – Eric Becker, Bob Del Russo, Freddy Fredrick, Pat Gleason, Charlie Huntley, Lyn Noland, Mark Whitman, Easter Xua, Jay Kulick, John Meiklejohn, John Kosmaczewski, Chuck Reilly, and Guy Jones (ABC)

=== Writing ===
Writing
**Outstanding Writing for Nonfiction Programming**
- **Stardust: The Bette Davis Story – Peter Jones (TCM)**‡
  - American Masters: "Ernest Hemingway: Rivers to the Sea" – DeWitt Sage (PBS)
  - American Masters: "John Ford/John Wayne: The Filmmaker and the Legend" – Ken Bowser (PBS)
  - How William Shatner Changed the World – Alan Handel and Julian Jones (The History Channel)
  - Penn & Teller: Bullshit!: "Prostitution" – Penn Jillette, Teller, Cliff Schoenberg, Jon Hotchkiss, Michael Goudeau, and Star Price (Showtime)
