= Bill Maher: WhinyLittleBitch =

- Genre: Stand-up comedy
- Starring: Bill Maher
- Country of origin: United States
- Original language: English

Original release
- Network: Facebook
- Release: November 2, 2016

Bill Maher: WhinyLittleBitch (also spelled Bill Maher: #WhinyLittleBitch) is a 2016 stand-up comedy special that live streamed on Facebook starring Bill Maher.

== Critical reception ==
Daily Kos wrote "Bill isn't everyone's cup-o-tea, but he really nails Trump to the railroad tracks with this one."

HuffPost said "Maher destroyed the Republican presidential nominee in his "Whiny Little Bitch" standup event using his sometimes-obscene shtick to sum up the sentiments of many Americans before Tuesday's election."
