= Bill Maher: Adulting =

- Genre: Stand-up comedy
- Starring: Bill Maher
- Country of origin: United States
- Original language: English

Original release
- Network: HBO
- Release: 2022

Bill Maher: Adulting (also spelled as Bill Maher: #Adulting) is a 2022 HBO stand-up comedy television special starring Bill Maher.

== Critical reception ==
Vulture said "In Maher's old stand-up, he made proclamations filled with the arrogance of a guy who felt he'd thought of angles you hadn't. In #Adulting, he's not just detached from the prickly daily realities of navigating gender-identity struggles and rethinking American power dynamics, he wants you to join him. If you can afford to, have at it."

Time wrote "Maher demands in #Adulting, during a riff on the supposed cancellation of Aziz Ansari. "So many perfect people who never make a mistake, never do anything wrong, yet get to judge your date." Comedian, heal thyself."
