= The New New Rules =

2011 book by Bill Maher

The New New Rules: A Funny Look At How Everybody But Me Has Their Head Up Their Ass
- Author: Bill Maher
- Language: English
- Subject: Politics, American culture
- Publisher: Blue Rider Press
- Publication date: 2011
- Publication place: United States
- Media type: Print
- Pages: 354
- ISBN: 9780399158414
- Preceded by: New Rules: Polite Musings from a Timid Observer

The New New Rules: A Funny Look At How Everybody But Me Has Their Head Up Their Ass is a book by Bill Maher. It is the sequel to his 2005 book, New Rules: Polite Musings from a Timid Observer. The book was published in late 2011 by Blue Rider Press, an imprint of Penguin Books.

The book debuted at No. 11 on The New York Times Best Seller non-fiction list.
