= Bill Maher: Crazy Stupid Politics =

2012 comedy special

- Bill Maher inaugurating Yahoo Screen with Crazy Stupid Politics
- Genre: Stand-up comedy
- Starring: Bill Maher
- Country of origin: United States
- Original language: English

Original release
- Network: Yahoo Screen
- Release: 2012

Bill Maher: Crazy Stupid Politics is a 2012 stand-up comedy special starring Bill Maher that premiered on Yahoo Screen.

According to The Ann Arbor News, "Crazy Stupid Politics is a free hour of Maher's political stand-up comedy, designed to titillate fans and amuse those with which he'd agree and irrationally anger whomever identifies with the antagonized side of his political spectrum."
