= Engineering an Empire =

- Genre: Documentary
- Presented by: Peter Weller
- Narrated by: Michael Carroll
- Music by: Michael Richard Plowman; Peter Boyer
- Country of origin: United States
- Original language: English
- No. of seasons: 1
- No. of episodes: 14

Production
- Executive producer: Dolores Gavin
- Producer: Randy Martin
- Running time: approx. 44–90 minutes
- Production companies: Kralyevich Productions; Mechanism Digital; Bloober Team (game)

Original release
- Network: History Channel
- Release: September 13, 2005 – March 25, 2010

Engineering an Empire is a television documentary miniseries that originally aired on the History Channel. The series explores the engineering and/or architectural feats that were characteristic of notable societies and cultures.

It is hosted by Peter Weller, who is most famous for playing the titular role in RoboCop (1987). When the series was made he had recently earned a master's degree in Roman and Renaissance art at Syracuse University. The show started as a documentary about the engineering feats of Ancient Rome and later evolved into a series. It originally ran for one full season of weekly episodes.

A video game, History: Egypt – Engineering an Empire, was released on March 25, 2010. This was the very first video game developed by Bloober Team, who would later become well known for their horror titles such as Observer (video game) starring Rutger Hauer as David Lazarski in one of his final voice acting roles.

== Reception ==
Engineering an Empire received critical acclaim. The premiere "Rome" won two Emmys after being nominated in four categories.

Tracy Spurrier of the Archaeological Institute of America gave the episode "Egypt" a positive review and praised the show's live action and CGI reenactments of building the ancient monuments. However, she was disappointed about the absence of the Great Pyramids of Giza.

== Episodes ==
Episode Number	Episode Name	Civilization	Original Air Date
1	Rome	Ancient Rome	September 13, 2005
2	Egypt	Ancient Egypt	October 9, 2006
3	Greece	Ancient Greece	October 16, 2006
4	Greece: Age of Alexander	Macedon	October 23, 2006
5	The Aztecs	Aztec	October 30, 2006
6	Carthage	Ancient Carthage	November 6, 2006
7	The Maya: Death Empire	The Maya	November 13, 2006
8	Russia	Russian Empire	November 20, 2006
9	Britain: Blood and Steel	British Empire	November 27, 2006
10	The Persians	First Persian Empire	December 4, 2006
11	China	Imperial China	December 11, 2006
12	Napoleon: Steel Monster	First French Empire	December 18, 2006
13	The Byzantines	Byzantine Empire	December 25, 2006
14	Da Vinci's World	Italian Renaissance	January 8, 2007
