= True Story: A Novel =

1994 book by Bill Maher

True Story
- Author: Bill Maher
- Language: English
- Publisher: Random House. Simon & Schuster
- Publication date: 1994
- Publication place: United States
- Media type: Print
- Pages: 302
- ISBN: 0-7432-4251-3
- Followed by: When You Ride Alone You Ride with bin Laden

True Story: A Novel is a book by Bill Maher. It was Maher's first book, and his only novel. It was first published in 1994 by Random House and was published in 2000 by Simon & Schuster. The book is an episodic novel detailing the true accounts of Maher and other stand-up comics in the late 1970s and early 1980s.

== Production ==
Maher began writing True Story while he was working in comedy clubs, shortly after graduating from Cornell University with a degree in English.

I did have a deep desire to write one novel. I always believed from my English studies that most novelists wrote one great novel and then pretty much wrote the same one over and over. So I thought I'd just write one.

— Bill Maher

== Reception ==
Richard Bernstein from The New York Times gave a mixed to favourable review, stating "when True Story works, it works because of Mr. Maher's energetic intelligence and his creation of characters whose prolonged sophomorism has distinct qualities", as did Raw Sawhill from The New York Times, who stated that whilst the first half of the book seemed like "an underdramatized blur", Maher "comes through with a handful of well-conceived scenes" in its second half.
