= Bob La Masney =

American sound engineer

- Occupation: Sound engineer

Bob La Masney is an American sound engineer. He is known for his work on the television programs Mom, The Big Bang Theory, B Positive, Mike & Molly, Two and a Half Men and Sister, Sister. He has won thirteen Primetime Emmy Awards and has been nominated for twenty-two more in the category Outstanding Sound Mixing.
