= Bill Maher =

American comedian and television host (born 1956)

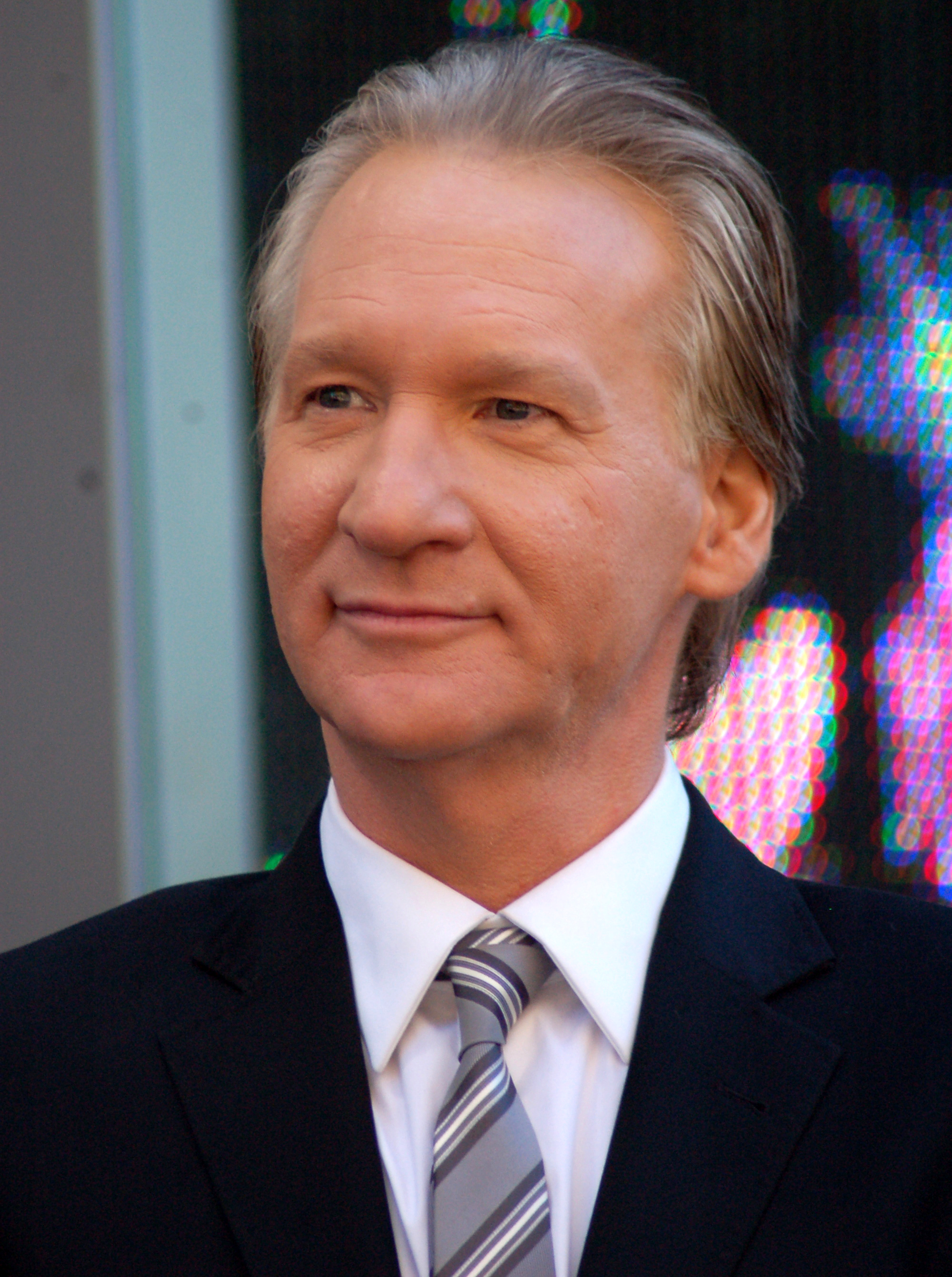
- Maher in 2010
- Born: William Maher; January 20, 1956 (age 70); New York City, U.S.
- Education: Cornell University (BA)
- Occupations: Television host; comedian; actor; political commentator
- Years active: 1979–present

Comedy career
- Medium: Stand-up; television; film; books; podcast
- Genres: Political/news satire; observational comedy; insult comedy; black comedy; cringe comedy; sarcasm
- Subjects: Mass media; news media; media criticism; American politics; American culture; current events; religion; pop culture
- Website: billmaher.com

William Maher (Note: /mɑːr/ MAR) (born January 20, 1956) is an American television host, comedian, actor and political commentator. Known for his political satire, he is the host of the HBO political talk show Real Time with Bill Maher (2003–present) and podcast Club Random (2022–present). He previously hosted a late-night show called Politically Incorrect (1993–2002) on ABC and Comedy Central.

Often described as a moderate liberal, Maher targets many topics including religion, political correctness, and the mass media. His critical views of religion were the basis for his 2008 documentary film Religulous. He is a supporter of animal rights, having served on the board of PETA since 1997. Maher supports the legalization of cannabis, serving on the advisory board of NORML.

In 2005, Maher ranked at No. 38 on Comedy Central's 100 greatest stand-up comedians of all time. He received a Hollywood Walk of Fame star in 2010, and the Mark Twain Prize for American Humor in 2026. Maher has earned 41 Primetime Emmy Award nominations and a win for his work as executive producer for Vice in 2014. He has also received two nominations for Grammy Awards and one for a Tony Award.

== Early life and education ==
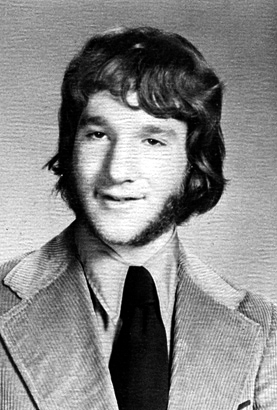
Maher's 1974 high school yearbook photo

William Maher was born in New York City on January 20, 1956. His father, William Aloysius Maher Jr., was a network news editor and radio announcer, and his mother, Julie Maher (née Berman), was a nurse. He was raised in his Irish-American father's Roman Catholic religion. Until his early teens, he was unaware that his mother, whose family was from Hungary, was Jewish. Owing to his disagreement with the Catholic Church's doctrine concerning birth control, Maher's father stopped taking Maher and his sister to Catholic Mass when Maher was thirteen.

Maher was raised in River Vale, New Jersey, and graduated from Pascack Hills High School in Montvale in 1974. He then attended Cornell University, where he double-majored in English literature and history. He graduated in 1978 with a Bachelor of Arts. Maher has said, "Selling pot allowed me to get through college and make enough money to start off in comedy."

== Career ==
=== Early career ===
Maher began his career as a comedian and actor. He was host of the New York City comedy club Catch a Rising Star in 1979. Maher began appearing on Johnny Carson's and David Letterman's shows in 1982. In 1984 he served as "announcer and sidekick" in all six episodes of the Disney Channel's Steve Allen's Music Room.

He made limited television appearances including on Sara (1985), Max Headroom (1987), Murder, She Wrote (1989, 1990), and Charlie Hoover (1991). His feature film debut was in D.C. Cab (1983). He later appeared in Ratboy (1986), House II: The Second Story (1987), Cannibal Women in the Avocado Jungle of Death (1988), Newhart (1988), hosted the talk show Midnight Hour on CBS (1990) and appeared in Pizza Man (1991).

=== Television career ===
==== Politically Incorrect with Bill Maher ====
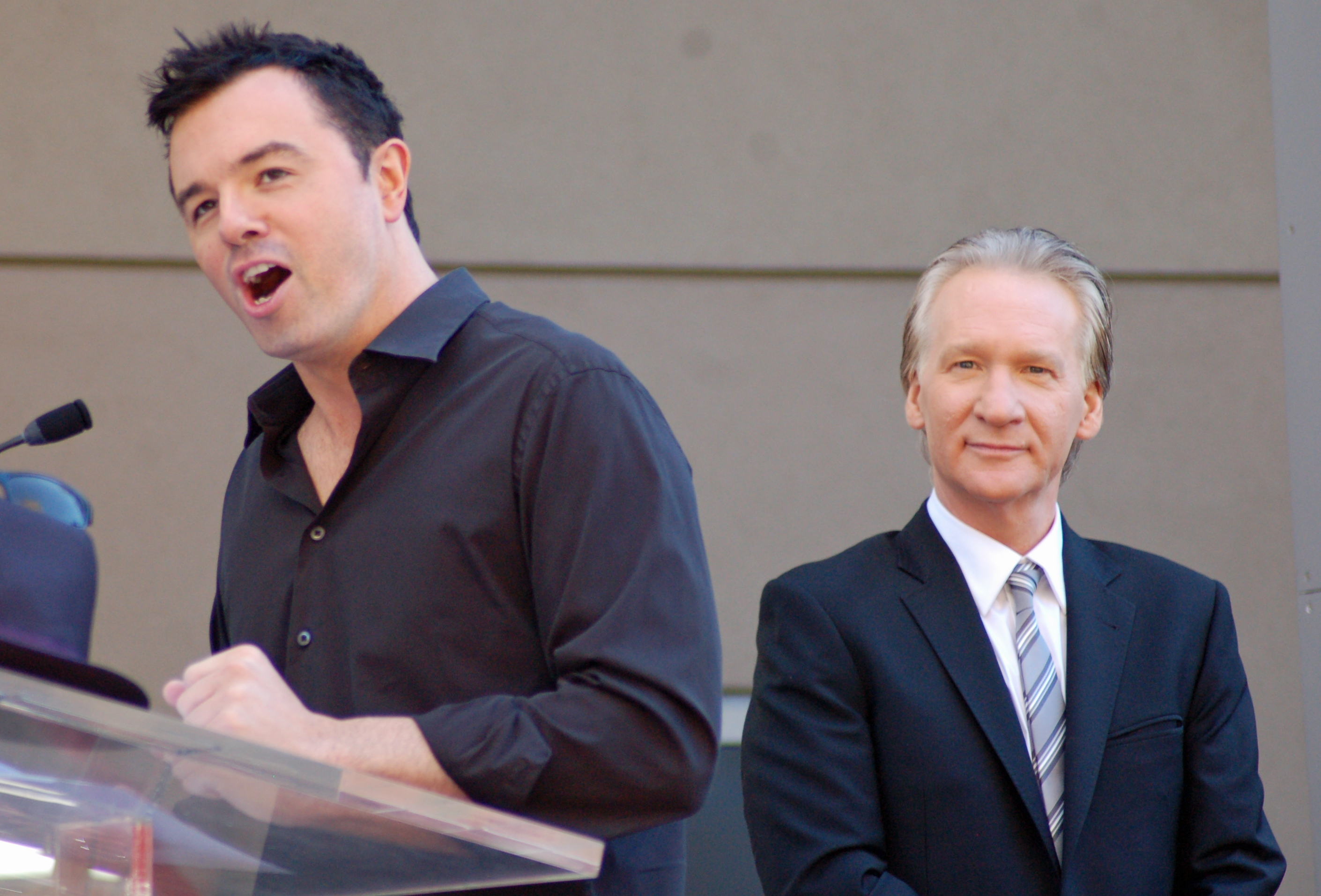
Seth MacFarlane speaking at a ceremony for Maher to receive a star on the Hollywood Walk of Fame in September 2010

Maher assumed the host role on Politically Incorrect with Bill Maher, a late-night political talk show that ran on Comedy Central from 1993 to 1997 and on ABC from 1997 to 2002. The show regularly began with a topical monologue by Maher preceding the introduction of four guests, usually a diverse group of individuals, such as show business, popular culture, political pundits, political consultants, authors, and occasionally news figures. The group would discuss topical issues selected by Maher, who also participated in the discussions. Jerry Seinfeld, a regular guest on the show, stated that Politically Incorrect reminded him of talk shows from the 1950s and '60s "when guests interacted with each other as much as with the host".

Politically Incorrect won an array of awards, including an Emmy Award for Outstanding Technical Direction, two CableACE awards for Best Talk Show Series, and a Genesis Award for Best Television Talk Show. Maher earned numerous award nominations for his producing, writing, and hosting of Politically Incorrect, including ten Emmy nominations, two TV Guide nominations, and two Writers Guild nominations. ABC decided against renewing Maher's contract for Politically Incorrect in 2002, after he made a controversial on-air remark six days after the September 11 attacks. He agreed with his guest, conservative pundit Dinesh D'Souza, that the 9/11 terrorists did not act in a cowardly manner (in rebuttal to President Bush's statement calling them cowards). Maher said, "We have been the cowards. Lobbing cruise missiles from 2,000 miles away. That's cowardly. Staying in the airplane when it hits the building. Say what you want about it. Not cowardly. You're right." Maher later clarified that his comment was not anti-military, referencing his well-documented and longstanding support for the American armed services. After receiving complaints, FedEx and Sears pulled their advertisements from the show, costing the show significant revenue.

Maher's remarks after 9/11 were not the first time he had sparked controversy on Politically Incorrect. In the same year, he expressed his deep regrets and apologized after being widely criticized for comparing his dogs to mentally disabled children. The show was canceled on June 16, 2002; the Sinclair Broadcast Group had dropped the show from its ABC-affiliated stations several months earlier. On June 22, 2002, six days after the cancellation of Politically Incorrect, Maher received the Los Angeles Press Club president's award (for "championing free speech"). Maher was on the board of judges for the 2002 PEN/Newman's Own First Amendment Award, which was given to writer Vanessa Leggett, imprisoned for 168 days for protecting sources and research notes.

==== Real Time with Bill Maher ====
In 2003, Maher became the host, co-producer, and co-writer of Real Time with Bill Maher, a weekly hour-long political comedy talk show on the cable television network HBO. In 2016, HBO renewed Real Time through 2018, for its 15th and 16th seasons. During an interview, Maher told Terry Gross (on NPR's Fresh Air) that he much prefers having serious and well-informed guests on his program, as opposed to the random celebrities that fleshed out his roundtable discussions on Politically Incorrect. After appearing on HBO on Fridays, Real Time is re-broadcast on CNN on Saturdays.

As with his previous show, Politically Incorrect, Maher begins Real Time with a comic opening monologue based upon current events and other topical issues. He proceeds to a one-on-one interview with a guest, either in-studio or via satellite. Following the interview, Maher sits with two or three panelists—usually consisting of pundits, authors, activists, actors, politicians, and journalists—for a discussion of the week's events.

Real Time has earned widespread praise. It has been nominated for more than ten Primetime Emmy Awards and six Writer's Guild awards. In 2007, Maher and his co-producers were awarded the Television Producer of the Year Award in Variety Television by the Producers Guild of America. Maher holds the record for the most Emmy nominations without a win, having been nominated on 22 occasions and not winning once. Eleven of the nominations were for Politically Incorrect, while nine were for Real Time. The other two were nominations for two of his HBO comedy specials: I'm Swiss and Bill Maher: The Decider.

=== Political commentator ===
Maher is a frequent commentator on various cable news networks, including CNN, MSNBC, Fox News, and HLN. Maher has regularly appeared on CNN's The Situation Room with Wolf Blitzer and has also been a frequent guest on MSNBC's Hardball with Chris Matthews, The Rachel Maddow Show, and Countdown with Keith Olbermann. Maher has also appeared as a guest on HLN's The Joy Behar Show. He wrote the foreword for the 2002 book, Spin This!: All the Ways We Don't Tell the Truth by show host Bill Press.

Maher hosted the January 13, 2006, edition of Larry King Live, on which he was a frequent guest. Maher appeared as a special guest on the June 29, 2010, edition of the show, on which CNN anchor Larry King announced his retirement. Maher co-emceed the final show of Larry King Live on December 16, 2010, with Ryan Seacrest.

=== Other work ===
In 2004, Maher appeared on stage as Satan in The Steve Allen Theater production of "Hollywood Hell House", a spoof of Christian-run hell houses. The show was a faithful reproduction of an evangelistic scare-experience written by Reverend Keenan Roberts to terrify teenagers into declaring themselves Christians. "Our faith is that putting this up as itself, it will hoist itself on its own petard, that it's comical just as it is," explained producer Maggie Rowe. The show featured a rotating cast of over 160 celebrities, including Andy Richter (Jesus), Richard Belzer, Dave Thomas, Traci Lords, Craig Bierko, Sarah Silverman, and Julia Sweeney. Maher and director Larry Charles teamed up to make the movie Religulous, described by trade publication Variety as a documentary "that spoofs religious extremism across the world". It was released on October 3, 2008.

In 2013, Maher became one of the executive producers for the HBO newsmagazine series Vice. Also in 2013, Maher appeared on The Tonight Show with Jay Leno and offered to pay $5 million to a charity if Donald Trump would produce his birth certificate, a challenge meant to disprove a joke that Trump was the son of an orangutan. Maher said this in response to Trump having previously challenged President Barack Obama to produce his birth certificate, and having offered $5 million payable to a charity of Obama's choice if Obama would produce his college applications, transcripts, and passport records.

In response to Maher's offer, Trump produced his birth certificate, and then Trump launched a lawsuit after Maher was not forthcoming, claiming that Maher's $5 million offer was legally binding. "I don't think he was joking", Trump said. "He said it with venom." Trump withdrew his lawsuit against the comedian after eight weeks.

==== Club Random podcast ====
On March 21, 2022, Maher launched a podcast titled Club Random, a series hosting one-on-one interviews with guests, recorded in his bar at home, where he discusses everything except politics. Guests have included Quentin Tarantino, Jimmy Kimmel, Bella Thorne, Judd Apatow, Mike Tyson, Killer Mike, and William Shatner. In February 2024, Maher revealed that he decided not to release a two-hour interview with Kanye West recorded for Club Random because of the rapper's recent antisemitic comments. In March 2024, Maher announced that he was starting a podcast network with Chris Casey and Chuck LaBella called Club Random Studios. In May 2024, Maher told Jerry Seinfeld on the Club Random podcast that "after this year, I'm going to stop doing [stand-up]".

=== Sports team ownership ===
In 2012, Maher purchased a minority ownership interest in the New York Mets, which he sold in 2020.

== Political views ==
Maher often eschews political labels, referring to himself as "practical"; however, he has generally held moderately liberal views over the years. Maher stands against political correctness. In his words, "The difference is that liberals protect people, and P.C. people protect feelings." In the past, he has also described himself as a libertarian, and has also referred to himself "as a progressive, as a sane person". Maher discussed his libertarian streak with Rainn Wilson on a 2023 episode of the Club Random podcast, saying "There are parts of me that are libertarian, yes, I always was for smoking pot, and leaving, you know, our private lives whatever way we want as long as it doesn't hurt anybody else" and "I can't ever believe why it's so hard in this country to achieve 'liberal-but-not-stupid-woke,' 'fiscally-sane-but-not-cruel.' Is that really that fucking impossible?"

In a 2012 panel discussion with Salman Rushdie, Maher counted himself, Rushdie, and others such as Ayaan Hirsi Ali, Christopher Hitchens, and Sam Harris as "9/11 liberals", noting that they differentiate themselves from many mainstream liberals in saying that not all religions are alike and that they are not bigoted in singling out the religion of Islam for criticism: "we are liberals, and we are liberals on almost every issue, but not the Muslim issue." He said in a later interview: "It's ridiculous to label criticism of a religion as a phobia of a religion. I'm going to criticize any person or group that violates liberal principles...." He has addressed his Republican fans who have asked him why he, after frequently criticizing the Democratic party over the years for various policies and decisions and being "so good in roasting the woke nonsense-peddlers", will not just "go all the way and join" the right-wing by saying "because I don’t want to live in North Korea".

Maher favors the ending of corporate welfare and federal funding of non-profits; he also favors the legalization of gambling, prostitution, and cannabis. Maher also supports the death penalty. Maher describes himself as an environmentalist, and he has spoken in favor of the Kyoto treaty on global warming on his show Real Time. He often criticizes industry figures involved in environmental pollution. He is a board member of People for the Ethical Treatment of Animals. In 2007, Maher noted the hypocrisy of people who claim they distrust "elite" politicians, writing, "I don’t get it: In other fields — outside of government — elite is a good thing, like an elite fighting force. Tiger Woods is an elite golfer. If I need brain surgery, I’d like an elite doctor. But in politics, elite is bad [...] When the anti-elite crowd demonizes the elite, what they’re actually doing is embracing incompetence."

After NPR CEO Katherine Maher (no relation) defended NPR's journalism as "completely unbiased" at a congressional hearing in March 2025, Bill Maher characterized the radio network as "crazy far-left" and called for defunding public media outlets, arguing that the country is "past the age" of subsidizing them.

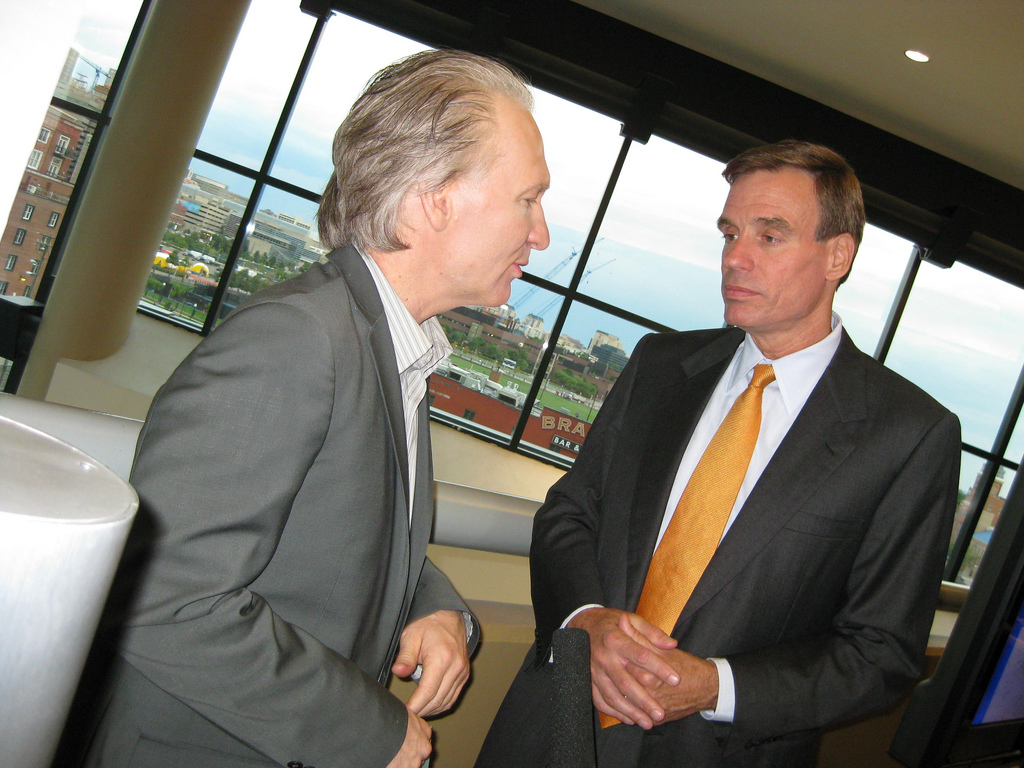
Maher with Senator Mark Warner (D-Virginia)

=== Candidates and endorsements ===
Maher considers himself to be at odds with both the Republican Party and the Democratic Party. In the 2008 U.S. presidential election, Maher announced his support for U.S. Senator Barack Obama (D-IL). Although Maher welcomed Obama's electoral victory, he soon became critical of the new president for not acting more boldly on health care reform and other liberal issues. On February 23, 2012, after his "Crazy Stupid Politics" special streamed on Yahoo! Screen, Maher announced that he was contributing $1 million to Priorities USA, the Obama SuperPAC. Maher has voted for Bob Dole and Ralph Nader.

In the lead-up to the 2014 midterm elections, Maher conducted a "Flip a District" contest on his HBO show. His audience was asked to select one "terrible, entrenched" member of Congress in a close election race—"the loserest loser of all"—to remove from office. Maher aimed to help oust that representative by shining a "national spotlight" on the politician during segments of his show and stand-up comedy appearances in that member's district during the Fall election. Maher ultimately selected Republican Representative John Kline from Minnesota's 2nd congressional district, but he failed to prevent him from winning against his Democratic-Farmer-Labor Party opponent Mike Obermueller.

In the 2016 U.S. presidential election, Maher initially endorsed Senator Bernie Sanders on February 5, 2016. Maher later announced his support for Hillary Clinton after Clinton won the nomination from the Democratic Party primary elections in June 2016. In October 2016, Maher criticized WikiLeaks founder Julian Assange for publishing leaks from the DNC's emails, saying: "I really feel like he's lost his way a little, and he hates Hillary." On March 31, 2017, following her defeat, Maher responded on air to suggestions Clinton was ready to end her low profile and speak out: "Hillary, stay in the woods. Okay. You had your shot. You fucked it up. You're Bill Buckner. We had the World Series, and you let the grounder go through your legs. Let someone else have the chance." In August 2019, Maher said an economic recession would be "worth it" if Donald Trump did not get re-elected in 2020. He said: "We have survived many recessions. We can't survive another Donald Trump term."

Over the course of 20 different editions of Real Time with Bill Maher broadcast between April 13, 2018, and August 7, 2020, and in several press interviews, Maher predicted that Trump would refuse to concede any loss in the 2020 United States presidential election, dedicating a 'New Rules' end segment to the subject on January 25, 2020. Maher highlighted Trump's own public references to Maher's assertions that Trump was "not going to leave", and quoted Trump's March 14, 2019, assertion, "I have the support of the police, the military, the bikers [for Trump]" and "the tough people", citing this as evidence that Trump would seek to remain in office by force. Maher predicted there would be violence by armed Trump supporters attempting to keep Trump in power and criticized Democratic Party politicians for not taking the threat seriously:

"So my question to all Democratic candidates is: what's the plan? If you win, and the next day he claims he's voiding the election because of irregularities he's hearing about, what do you do? What do you do when the crowd that was in Virginia this week, 22,000 strong, marches on Washington? This is a scary moment. And when I've asked Democrats, 'What do we do if he doesn't go?', their answer is always some variation of 'We have to win big!'... First of all, NO! No, we don't have to win by a landslide! Jesus, fucking Democrats! I am so sick of Democrats volunteering to play by two different sets of rules. That's the new paradigm? Republicans can win by one vote, but we're not legitimate unless it's a landslide? Fuck. And two, do you really think it would matter if it was? That they would suddenly get rational about math and facts? They believe Hillary ran a pedophile ring out of a pizza parlor!"

Maher later said in an August 15, 2020, interview with Vanity Fair that "we've baked it into the cake that he's not going to leave." In the September 25, 2020, edition of Real Time, Maher criticized the framing of a New York Times story by Michael Crowley headlined "Trump Won't Commit to Peaceful Transfer of Power", which ran on page 15 of the print edition of the paper. Maher asserted, "I got no help from the New York Times, Washington Post, [or] CNN", adding that the media "should have amplified" the severity of Trump's threats that he would refuse to concede or commit to a peaceful transition of power.

In January 2022, Maher declined to run in the 2024 United States presidential election following speculation by Dana Perino that he might be called on to do so. In July 2024, he called on Joe Biden to decline the Democratic party's nomination in order to have an open convention at the Democratic Convention; Maher expressed his support for Gavin Newsom to replace Biden as the party's nominee.

In February 2025, Maher endorsed Pennsylvania Senator John Fetterman for the 2028 Democratic Party presidential primaries and praised his strong support of the Israeli government and stance against "woke".

In July 2026, Maher expressed openness to voting for JD Vance if he was the 2028 Republican nominee, pointing to the rise in support of the Democratic Socialists of America on the left. The same month, he described the DSA as “communists” and suggested he would vote for Sarah Palin instead, despite also referring to her as a “bimbo”.

In March 2025 and October 2026, Maher had dinner with Donald Trump at the White House.

=== National security ===
On June 7, 2013, Maher expressed on his show limited support for the NSA's PRISM intelligence data collection from private phone calls and the Internet, saying that the threat of terrorists obtaining and using nuclear weapons was the tipping point for him. While he stated that he trusted the Obama administration to employ the program responsibly, he described the NSA's access to private data as a "slippery slope", and worried about whether other politicians would be as responsible.

Since the 9/11 attacks, he has endorsed certain uses of profiling at airports, saying, "Places like Israel, where they have faced terrorism for a long time, of course understand that profiling is part of all detective work. It's part of all police work. If they stop calling it profiling and start calling it high-intelligence screening or something, people would go, it's about time."

Maher opposed Trump's Executive Order 13769, which banned entry into the US of citizens from five majority-Muslim countries, and has hosted multiple guests, including Sam Harris and Jim Jefferies, on his show who have also opposed the order. In 2022, Maher criticized the Biden administration's Disinformation Governance Board and agreed with the comparison that the board was similar to the Ministry of Truth from George Orwell's dystopian novel Nineteen Eighty-Four.

=== Foreign policy ===
Maher favors having a strong military, but has said he is disenchanted with the size of the American military and defense spending. In 2015, Maher criticized Barack Obama's visit to Saudi Arabia, a close U.S. ally, saying: "Stop respecting their medieval bullshit under the guise of, 'It's their culture.'" Maher opposed the Iraq War from the beginning and has summarized his opinion by saying that the United States and the world have had to pay too high a price for the war.

On the Israeli–Palestinian conflict, Maher says he is "more on the side of the Israelis" and does not consider both sides equally guilty. He acknowledges that "Palestinians do have gripes", and he has been critical of U.S. financial aid to Israel, saying "they don't need our money, they can handle it themselves." Maher says that most Israelis prefer a two-state solution and oppose the hard-line stance of their government, which he describes as having been taken over by their version of the Tea Party. However, Maher has defended Israel's military actions against Palestinians amid criticism over civilian deaths and disproportionate casualty count between Israelis and Palestinians during the 2014 Gaza war. He argues that Israel is still showing restraint, and he finds it ironic that the same people who were incredulous over how the Jews in World War II were led "to their slaughter" cannot understand why they are defending themselves now. Maher faced online backlash for tweeting at the start of the war, "Dealing w/ Hamas is like dealing w/ a crazy woman who's trying to kill u - u can only hold her wrists so long before you have to slap her".

In August 2019, Maher denounced the Boycott, Divestment and Sanctions movement, saying: "It's predicated on this notion ... I think it's very shallow thinking that the Jews in Israel are mostly white and Palestinians are mostly brown, so they must be innocent and correct and the Jews must be wrong." He responded to Rep. Rashida Tlaib's call to boycott his talk show: "Some people have one move only: boycott. Cancel. Make-go-away. But here's the thing, the house voted 318 (Note: There were 398 votes in favor. Maher later corrected himself on this.) to 17 to condemn the #BDS movement, including 93% of Dems. Does Tlaib want to boycott 93% of her own party?" Condemning the October 7 attacks, Maher spoke about it as Israel's 9/11, and took serious issue with people who seemed to applaud these attacks; however, he cautioned Israel not to "lose the moral high ground" in the Gaza war. Maher expressed disappointment with former President Barack Obama over his comments on the Gaza war, saying that "there is a big difference between collateral damage and what Hamas did."

In April 2020, Maher criticized those who equated using the term "Wuhan virus" with racism, stating, "Scientists...have been naming diseases after the places they came from for a very long time. Zika is from the Zika Forest, Ebola from the Ebola River, hantavirus the Hantan River. There's the West Nile virus and Guinea worm and Rocky Mountain spotted fever and, of course, the Spanish flu." He added: "This has nothing to do with Asian Americans, and it has everything to do with China." In March 2021, Maher criticized China's persecution of the Uyghur minority in Xinjiang. However, he also said the United States has "lost" to China in the "battle for the 21st century". He said that China is dominating the world while the U.S. is wasting time in a "never-ending woke competition". He also compared China's "40,000 kilometers of high-speed rail" to his own country, which had none.

In September 2025, Maher criticized the lack of news coverage on the persecution of Christians in Nigeria, stating that they are being "systematically killed". He rhetorically questioned: "Where are the kids protesting this?"

In September 2026, Maher denied the Gaza genocide on his “Real Time with Bill Maher” show, stating that “Gaza=genocide is a lie, an easily provable lie.” Maher called Israel's actions since the Oct. 7, 2023, attack “a counterattack in a war, a war that’s been raged against Israel since 1948, based on the ridiculous premise that Jews don’t belong in the one place on earth they are indigenous.” Maher said that if a famine happened in Gaza, it occurred because Hamas stole food, often donated by Israel, intended for Palestinians. He added that while the deaths of Palestinians is tragic, he highlighted Israel’s actions to aid Palestinians during the war and contrasted the percentage of deaths in Gaza with the percentage of Polish Jews killed during the Holocaust. Maher criticized rapper Macklemore for his Pro-Palestinian advocacy in the midst of the Macklemore–Ed Sheeran tour controversy, referring to a controversial costume he wore at a concert in 2014 and calling his statements about the situation in Gaza being a genocide a "lie".

=== Race ===
In June 2017, Maher came under criticism for saying in an off-the-cuff joke "I'm a house nigger" in response to guest Senator Ben Sasse offering Maher to work on the fields in his home state on Real Time. This led to calls being made by people to HBO to fire him. Following the episode, HBO sent a statement to media outlets, calling Maher's remarks "inexcusable and tasteless", and said the cable network would remove that segment from future airings of the show. Maher also issued a statement apologizing for the remarks, saying in part, "I regret the word I used in the banter of a live moment. The word was offensive, and I regret saying it and am very sorry." Maher apologized on his show and had a discussion with Michael Eric Dyson, Ice Cube, and Symone Sanders about the controversy.

In 2021, Maher opposed the NFL's decision to play the "Black national anthem" before games, considering it a form of segregation. Instead, he argued for one national anthem and rejected separate ceremonies and dorms based on race, which drew some criticism. In 2022, Maher criticized the Democratic Party for "checking boxes" in regard to candidates of different identity groups, including race. He stated that Democrats prioritize diversity over merit. Maher has also spoken out against critical race theory but supports teaching the history of racism.

=== Immigration ===
In November 2015, Maher expressed opposition to the United States accepting Syrian refugees. Maher argued that they have different values which are at odds with American values due to some refugees may be coming from places which are governed by Sharia law or want to be. Maher cited cases in the UK where Muslim immigrants had carried out female genital mutilation and honor killings. In 2021, after the withdrawal of U.S. troops from Afghanistan, Maher urged America to take in Afghan refugees. Maher has criticized Donald Trump's opposition to immigration, including his proposed border wall, and accused him of hypocrisy, having himself married two immigrants. Maher has also accused Republicans of hypocrisy for opposing immigration and praising their immigrant parents, saying "You can't spend the first half of a debate bitching about how immigrants are ruining the country and the second half on the uplifting stories of your immigrant parents." Maher has criticized Democrats' approach to immigration and has praised Canada's system, saying "Canada is much more to the right on immigration. You have to have a skill. That's mostly what it's based on. Ours is mostly based on family."

=== Gun rights and hunting rights ===
Maher endorsed a 2014 Maine referendum to ban the use of bait, traps and dogs to hunt bears in Maine. He specifically criticized the use of bait, referring to its use as "nothing but an execution". Maher is a gun owner, and explained in his February 12, 2013, appearance on the late-night TV talk show Conan that he owns guns for personal home protection. However, he does not identify himself as a "proud" gun owner, commenting that being a proud gun owner is akin to "saying I'm a 'proud remote control owner'". Maher has stated that statistics showing that gun owners are more likely to harm a member of their household are caused by irresponsible gun owners, and believes that tragedies such as school shootings will not lead to a fundamental change in gun laws because both Democrats and Republicans favor guns. Maher has also questioned the need to own large arsenals of guns. He believes the Second Amendment is "bullshit" and said that bipartisan background check legislation proposed by Pat Toomey and Joe Manchin was "so marginal". In 2022, Maher blamed mass shooting in part due to Hollywood romanticization of gun violence in movies. However, Maher has said that despite him not liking guns he is glad that they exist, saying it "levels the playing field".

== Views ==
=== Religion ===
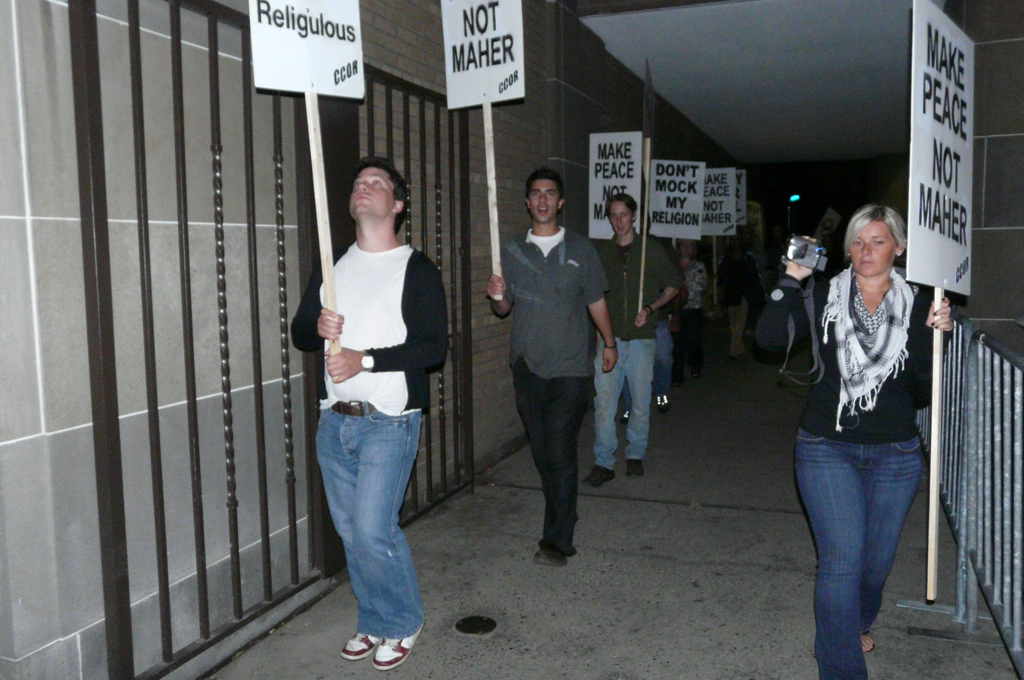
Protesters outside Ryerson University awaiting the arrival of Bill Maher on September 6, 2008

Maher is highly critical of religion and views it as highly destructive. He has been described, or self-identified, variously as an agnostic, atheist, and apatheist, while objecting to having his views defined by a single label. In his 2008 feature film Religulous, he refers to himself as agnostic. He has rejected being grouped with explicit atheists, saying in 2002, "I'm not an atheist. There's a really big difference between an atheist and someone who just doesn't believe in religion. Religion to me is a bureaucracy between man and God that I don't need, but I'm not an atheist, no."

Maher has occasionally referred to himself as an apatheist, saying in 2011 "I don't know what happens when you die, and I don't care." When discussing his apatheism and his views on the existence of God, he said on a scale from 1 to 7 (7 being "absolutely certain there is no god"), he was only at 6.9, like Richard Dawkins, "because we just don't know ... but we just don't think about it." He added, "There's atheist and there's agnostic, and I'm okay with us not splitting the difference on those; if you are just not a super-religious person, you are on my team." Several months later on a 2012 episode of his HBO show, Maher declared that "idiots must stop claiming that atheism is a religion ... believe it or not, I don't really enjoy talking about religion all the time. In fact, not only is atheism not a religion, it's not even my hobby, and that's the best thing about being an atheist. It requires so little of your time." He has reiterated his stance during other interviews, rejecting both the certitude of the existence, as well as the certitude of nonexistence of deities, concluding, "I'm saying that doubt is the only appropriate response for human beings."

While critical of all organized religions, saying "they're all stupid and dangerous", Maher says all religions are not alike, and has drawn comparisons and contrasts between them. He has said, "By any standard, Mormonism is more ridiculous than any other religion." He has referred to tenets of Judaism as "insane" and "funny", and has said that Buddhism includes some crazy things like "reincarnation". He has described Christianity and Islam as more "warlike", and has asserted that, like historic Christianity, present-day Islam needs to undergo its own reformation and enlightenment.

In defense of his criticism of Islam, Sharia law and Muslim culture, Maher says he "believes in the values that Western people believe in which a lot of the Muslim world does not. Like separation of church and state. Like equality of the sexes. Like respect for minorities, free elections, free speech, freedom to gather. These things are not just different from cultures that don't have them.... It's better ... I would like to keep those values here." In 2017, Maher agreed with the author Sam Harris that "the left has allied itself with Islamists", and that the liberals had failed to stand up to Islamic extremism.

Citing studies and poll results by Pew Research Center, the World Economic Forum and others, Maher says the human rights violations and "illiberal ideas" found in Islam are not extremist views held by a small minority but are supported by a majority of citizens in Muslim countries. Maher has criticized liberals as hypocritical for defending these core liberal values and ideals only at home, while not condemning the oppression of these values and groups in Muslim culture. Regarding the more recent publicity generated by his stance in the ongoing debate, Maher says he thinks people are finally paying closer attention to a conversation that they need to have. "I'm just shining a light on the reality of the situation. I don't even understand why this is so controversial."

Maher received the 2009 Richard Dawkins Award from Atheist Alliance International. He was an advisory board member of author Sam Harris's Project Reason, a foundation that promotes scientific knowledge and secular values within society. In 2023, while still being critical of religion, Maher discussed some of his spiritual queries and interests with long-time friend and new age guru, Deepak Chopra.

=== Health and health care ===
Maher supports the establishment of a Medicare-for-All universal single-payer health care system, and has consistently agreed with the proposal since 2011. Maher has stated that the American Medical Association is a powerful lobbying group and was one of the primary reasons why the United States had failed to enact health care reform in the decades prior to the passage of the Affordable Care Act. On the topic of getting the Affordable Care Act passed, in 2009 Maher stated that Obama should forget about trying to get 60 votes for it because "he only needs 51": "Forget getting the sixty votes or sixty percent—sixty percent of people don't believe in evolution in this country—he just needs to drag them to it, like I said, they're stupid; get health care done, with or without them." On Fox News in a televised debate with Bill O'Reilly, Maher said that "if Jesus was in charge of the country we'd probably have health care for everybody."

Maher has expressed the view that a lot of illness is the result of poor diet and lack of exercise, and that medicine is often not the most appropriate way of addressing illness. In an episode of his show about the 2008 presidential candidates' health plans, Maher stated that poor nutrition was a primary cause of illness, and that "the answer isn't another pill." He also has said: "If you believe you need to take all the pills the pharmaceutical industry says you do, then you're already on drugs!" He has expressed his distaste for the pharmaceutical and health care industries in general, arguing that they made their money out of treating people who are made sick by consuming unhealthy food that corporations push on the public. Maher maintains that mass consumption of high-fructose corn syrup is a contributor to the rise in frequency of obesity in the United States.

In a discussion with Michael Moore about Moore's 2007 film Sicko, Maher said, "The human body is pretty amazing; it doesn't get sick, usually, for no reason. I mean, there's some genetic stuff that can get to you, but, basically, people are sick in this country because they're poisoned. The environment is a poisoning factor, but also, we gotta say, they poison themselves. They eat shit. People eat shit, and that's, to my way of thinking, about 90 percent of why people are sick, is because they eat shit." Tara Parker-Pope and former Senator (R-TN) Bill Frist, a physician, have called Maher's criticism of the H1N1 flu vaccinations unscientific. Infectious diseases expert Paul Offit wrote that misinformation about vaccines from celebrities like Maher has put children at unnecessary risk.

Surgical Oncologist David Gorski criticized Maher's claims about vaccines several times on ScienceBlogs, and deemed it inappropriate that Maher received the Richard Dawkins Award. Skeptics, including magician and popular science writer Martin Gardner, neurologist Steven Novella, and magician Jamy Ian Swiss have also strongly rebuked Maher, characterizing him as anti-science, uninformed and potentially endangering the health of fans who take his "non-medical" advice. Maher responded to the criticism, saying, "What I've read about what they think I'm saying is not what I've said. I'm not a germ theory denier. I believe vaccinations can work. Polio is a good example. Do I think in certain situations that inoculating Third World children against malaria or diphtheria, or whatever, is right? Of course. In a situation like that, the benefits outweigh costs. But to me living in Los Angeles? To get a flu shot? No." In 2019, Gorski again criticized Maher for his HBO interview with the doctor Jay Gordon and Maher's claims about vaccines (in particular, the influenza vaccine), including the speculation about a link between vaccines and autism, which is debunked according to consensus science. In January 2021, Maher promoted the COVID-19 lab leak theory. On April 16, 2021, Maher called media coverage of the COVID-19 pandemic "panic porn" and added that "When all of our sources for medical information have an agenda to spin us, yeah, you wind up with a badly misinformed population, including on the left."

=== Cannabis legalization ===
Maher, who has a California medical marijuana card, openly and publicly uses cannabis, and has been a visible supporter of cannabis law reform. Maher is a member of the advisory boards for both the NORML and Marijuana Policy Project, organizations that support regulated legalization of cannabis. He sold cannabis while in college at Cornell and credits it for making his college and the beginning of his career as a comic possible. In 2015, Maher called on then President Barack Obama to pardon people incarcerated for marijuana offenses and later praised President Joe Biden for pardoning citizens convicted of marijuana offenses. He has been called "one of the brightest torches for sensible marijuana policy" and "a contemporary cannabis statesman".

=== Conspiracy theories ===
Maher has been a critic of 9/11 conspiracy theories. On October 19, 2007, Maher confronted several 9/11 truthers and had them ejected from his show audience after they interrupted the live show numerous times by calling out from the audience. The incident drew significant media attention and praise from Fox News talk show host and frequent critic John Gibson. Maher has spoken out against QAnon and the conspiracy theories they have promoted. Maher has criticized the decision to ban conspiracy theorist Alex Jones from Twitter saying "I don't like Alex Jones, but Alex Jones gets to speak. Everybody gets to speak."

=== Gender and sexuality ===
Maher has been critical of the #MeToo movement, describing it in February 2018 as McCarthyism. He has supported Chris Matthews against allegations of sexual harassment in 2020. He has also downplayed the sexual harassment allegations against former senator Al Franken including rejecting the idea that Franken was a "sexual predator" and has suggested that the allegations against Franken were political.

Maher supports same-sex marriage. He has referred to arguments against same-sex marriage as "bankrupt". In May 2022, on why more people are identifying as LGBT, Maher said "Yes, part of the rise in LGBT numbers is from people feeling free enough to tell it to a pollster, and that's all good, but some of it is [because] it's trendy". Maher also referred to puberty blockers and other transgender health care for trans youth as "literally experimenting on children". GLAAD criticized Maher for these statements and referred to him as transphobic, citing articles from organizations such as the World Health Organization and the American Academy of Pediatrics that state gender-affirming care is medically appropriate. He has claimed that Democrats will "lose every election" without changing their positions on trans issues and banning gender-affirming care for minors.

Maher has also criticized the Democratic Party's approach to sex education on multiple occasions. In March 2022, Maher rebuked liberals for their opposition to the Florida Parental Rights in Education Act and defended Republicans for pushing the bill.

=== 2023 Writers Guild of America strike ===
Maher criticized the 2023 Writers Guild of America strike on his Club Random podcast. Speaking to comedian Jim Gaffigan in September 2023, has stated, "they kind of believe that you're owed a living as a writer, and you're not". He went on to say that "They're asking for a lot of things that are, like, kooky." In an interview with TMZ, Maher stated he supported the strike and added that the writers have "legitimate gripes" with the studios. However, Maher clarified his problems with the strike noting "there are some things that [the writers] are demanding I don't agree with." In particular, Maher criticized the WGA proposal of having a mandate to have a particular set number of writers on each show. He stated, "They want to micromanage the creative process in a way that I think is antithetical to anybody that is an artist. They want to tell people how many people, what kind of people you can have working on your show, writing on your show". Maher stated his wish to have Governor Gavin Newsom help end the strike.

On September 13, 2023, Maher released a statement on Twitter announcing his plans to restart a version of his HBO show. He wrote in part:

"Real Time is coming back...It has been five months, and it is time to bring people back to work. The writers have important issues that I sympathize with, and hope they are addressed to their satisfaction, but they are not the only people with issues, problems and concerns...[I] will honor the spirit of the strike by not doing a monologue, desk piece, New Rules or editorial".

— Bill Maher

Maher's announcement, as well as the continuation of The Drew Barrymore Show and The View, led to protests. The Writers Guild of America released a statement describing Maher's decision as "disappointing", adding, "It is difficult to imagine how Real Time with Bill Maher can go forward without a violation of WGA strike rules taking place. WGA will be picketing this show." Early the next week, Maher said he would wait a few days to see what the next round of negotiations might produce.

== Awards and nominations ==
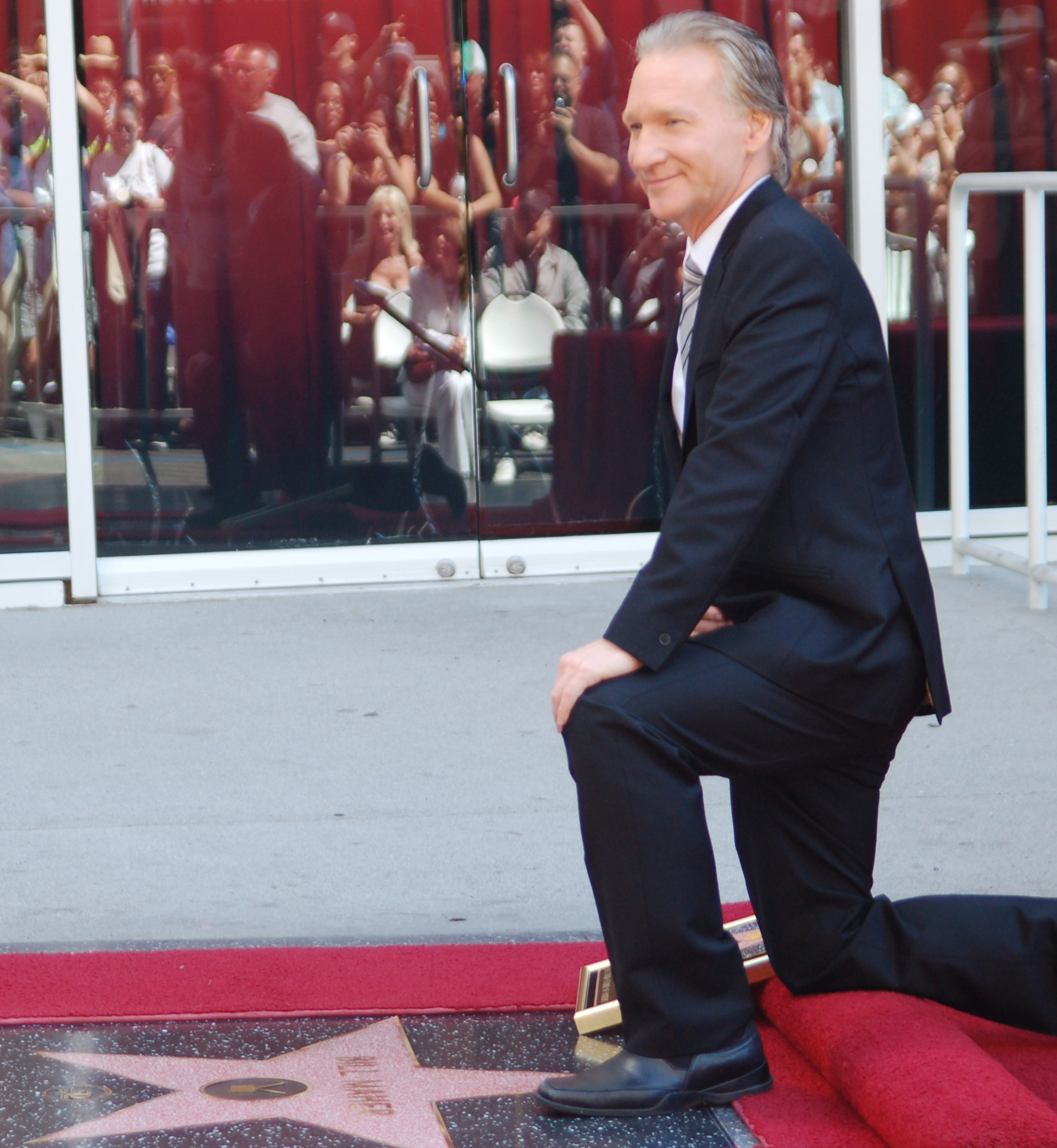
Maher next to his star on the Hollywood Walk of Fame in 2010

Maher has received 41 Primetime Emmy Award nominations winning for Outstanding Informational Series or Special for Vice in 2015. He also received two Grammy Award nominations and various Producers Guild of America Award and Writers Guild of America Award nominations. In 2003 he was nominated at the 57th Tony Awards for the Tony Award for Best Special Theatrical Event for Bill Maher: Victory Begins at Home. In 2016, Vice was nominated for the Peabody Award for their segment on Student debt. Maher was honored by High Times as "Top Pot Comic in 2006" and Real Time won a Stony Award in 2006 for "Best Cable News Show". High Times later designated him as "Stoner of the Year".

In 2026, Maher became the 27th recipient of the Mark Twain Prize for American Humor, awarded by the Kennedy Center.

== Personal life ==
Maher has never married. Regarding marriage, Maher is quoted on his website as saying, "I'm the last of my guy friends to have never gotten married, and their wives—they don't want them playing with me. I'm like the escaped slave—I bring news of freedom."

Maher has said his comedic influences include Lenny Bruce, Steve Allen, Johnny Carson, Robert Klein, and George Carlin. Comedians who have said they were influenced by Maher include Chris Rock.

In 2003, he began dating flight attendant Coco Johnsen. In November 2004, at the end of their 17-month relationship, Johnsen sued Maher for US$9 million for "pain and suffering" for alleged "insulting, humiliating and degrading racial comments." Her suit stated that Maher promised to marry her and father her children, support her financially and buy a house in Beverly Hills. Johnsen's suit also alleged that she quit her job as a flight attendant and occasional model to be with him. Maher's lawyers in their response, filed on November 23, 2004, in Los Angeles County Superior Court said Maher is a "confirmed bachelor, and a very public one at that" who "never promised to marry [Johnsen] or to have children with her." Maher's filing stated that, after the relationship had ended, Johnsen "launched a campaign to embarrass, humiliate, and extort ridiculous sums of money from Bill Maher." Johnsen's lawsuit was dismissed on May 2, 2005.

In 2005, Maher began dating Karrine Steffans, author and former hip hop model. When commentators suggested there was a pattern to his dating because both his girlfriend and former girlfriend were black, Maher said, "People say I'm into black women. Robert De Niro is into black women. I'm just into women who are real, and they happen to be black." From 2009 to 2011, Maher dated former adjunct professor, science educator, and current Skeptics' Guide to the Universe co-host Cara Santa Maria. Since 2014, Maher has dated Canadian singer Anjulie Persaud.

== Filmography ==
=== Film ===
Year	Title	Role	Ref.
1983	D.C. Cab	Baba	
1986	Ratboy	Party Guest	
1987	House II: The Second Story	John	
1989	Cannibal Women in the Avocado Jungle of Death	Jim	
1991	Pizza Man	Elmo Bunn	
1998	Primary Colors	Himself	
1999	EDtv	Himself	
2001	Tomcats	Carlos	
2002	John Q.	Himself	
2003	Pauly Shore Is Dead	Himself	
2005	The Aristocrats	Himself	
2005	Fuck	Himself	
2005	Inside Deep Throat	Himself	
2007	Heckler	Himself	
2008	Swing Vote	Himself	
2008	Religulous	Himself	
2012	The Campaign	Himself	
2013	Iron Man 3	Himself	
2013	Delivery Man	Himself	
2014	A Million Ways to Die in the West	Comic	
2014	The Interview	Himself	
2015	Ted 2	Himself	
2018	Gringo	Himself	
2019	Late Night	Himself	

=== Television ===
Year	Title	Role	Notes
1985	Alice	Officer Gary Conroy	Episode: "Vera's Anniversary Blues"
1985	Sara	Marty Lang	13 episodes
1986	Club Med	Rick	TV movie
1987	Rags to Riches	Freddie	Episode: "Pilot"
1987	Hard Knocks	Gower	3 episodes
1987	Max Headroom	Haskel	Episode: "Whacketts"
1988	Out of Time	Maxwell Taylor	TV movie
1988	Newhart	Norm Murphy	Episode: "The Buck Stops Here"
1989–90	Murder, She Wrote	Rick Rivers/Frank Albertson	2 episodes
1989–1992	One Night Stand	Himself	2 episodes
1991	Charlie Hoover	Elliot	4 episodes
1993	Married... with Children	Adam Gold	Episode: "You Can't Miss"
1993	The Jackie Thomas Show	Mr. Lorre	Episode: "Strike"
1993	Roseanne	Photographer	Episode: "It Was Twenty Years Ago Today"
1993–2002	Politically Incorrect	Himself (host)	2,266 episodes; creator, writer and executive producer
1997	The Larry Sanders Show	Himself	Episode: "The Roast"
1997	Dharma & Greg	Himself	Episode: "Mr. Montgomery Goes to Washington"
1998	V.I.P.	Himself	Episode: "One Wedding and Val's Funeral"
1999	Spin City	Himself	Episode: "Politically Incorrect"
1999	Brother's Keeper	Himself	Episode: "Politically Impolite"
1999	Snoops	Himself	Episode: "Higher Calling"
2000	The Chris Rock Show	Himself	Episode: "5.8"
2002	Son of the Beach	Himself	Episode: "Penetration Island"
2003–present	Real Time with Bill Maher	Himself (host)	Also creator, writer and executive producer
2004	MADtv	Himself	Episode: "10.6"
2008	True Blood	Himself	Episode: "Strange Love"
2010	The Sarah Silverman Program	Himself	Episode: "The Silverman and the Pillows"
2010	The Boondocks	Himself (voice)	Episode: "It's a Black President, Huey Freeman"
2010–2017	Family Guy	Himself (voice)	3 episodes
2012	The Good Wife	Himself	Episode: "Anatomy of a Joke"
2013	House of Cards	Himself	Episode: "Chapter 6"
2013–2018	Vice	—	113 episodes; executive producer
2015	Blackish	Himself	Episode: "Elephant in the Room"
2026	The Terminal List	Himself	Episode: "Romulus S.V,"

=== Specials ===
Year	Title	Platform
1995	Bill Maher: Stuff that Struck Me Funny	HBO
1997	Bill Maher: The Golden Goose Special	HBO
2000	Bill Maher: Be More Cynical	HBO
2003	Bill Maher: Victory Begins at Home	HBO
2005	Bill Maher: I'm Swiss	HBO
2007	Bill Maher: The Decider	HBO
2010	Bill Maher... But I'm Not Wrong	HBO
2012	Bill Maher: Crazy Stupid Politics	HBO
2014	Bill Maher: Live from D.C.	HBO
2016	Bill Maher: #WhinyLittleBitch	HBO
2018	Bill Maher: Live from Oklahoma	HBO
2022	Bill Maher: #Adulting	HBO
2025	Bill Maher: Is Anyone Else Seeing This?	HBO

== Bibliography ==
- True Story: A Novel, 1994 (ISBN 0-7432-4251-3)
- Does Anybody Have a Problem with That? Politically Incorrect's Greatest Hits, 1996 (ISBN 0-679-45627-9)
- Does Anybody Have a Problem with That? The Best of Politically Incorrect, 1997 (ISBN 0-345-41281-8)
- When You Ride Alone You Ride with bin Laden: What the Government Should Be Telling Us to Help Fight the War on Terrorism, 2003 (ISBN 1-893224-90-2)
- Keep the Statue of Liberty Closed: The New Rules, 2004 (ISBN 1-932407-47-2)
- New Rules: Polite Musings from a Timid Observer, 2005 (ISBN 1-59486-295-8)
- The New New Rules: A Funny Look at How Everybody but Me Has Their Head Up Their Ass, 2011 (ISBN 0-39915-841-3)
- What This Comedian Said Will Shock You, 2024

== See also ==
- List of atheists in film, radio, television and theater
