= Bill Maher: The Decider =

2007 stand-up comedy special by Bill Maher

- Genre: Stand-up comedy
- Written by: Bill Maher
- Starring: Bill Maher
- Country of origin: United States
- Original language: English

Original release
- Network: HBO
- Release: 2007

Bill Maher: The Decider is Bill Maher's eighth HBO stand-up comedy special. It was filmed on 21 July 2007 at the Berklee Performance Center in Boston, Massachusetts.

Maher talks about various social and political topics, such as the Iraq War, lobbying, sexuality, prescription drugs and religion. The title parodies one of the nicknames of then-U.S. president George W. Bush, and his politics and administration are a main topic of the special.
