= New Rules (book) =

2005 book by Bill Maher

New Rules: Polite Musings from a Timid Observer
- Author: Bill Maher
- Language: English
- Subject: Politics, American culture, sports
- Publisher: Rodale Books
- Publication date: 2005
- Publication place: United States
- Media type: Print
- Pages: 239 pp
- ISBN: 1-59486-505-1
- OCLC: 71366870
- Preceded by: When You Ride Alone You Ride with bin Laden
- Followed by: The New New Rules: A Funny Look at How Everybody but Me Has Their Head Up Their Ass

New Rules: Polite Musings from a Timid Observer is a 2005 book by comedian Bill Maher. It is published by Rodale, Inc. in Emmaus, Pennsylvania.

The book is a commentary on a variety of subjects ranging from cell phones to celebrities to politics. It is the second book in his "New Rules" trilogy. The publication plays off Bill Maher's segment on HBO's Real Time with Bill Maher which is also named "New Rules". The Rules are suggestions made by Maher to the general public. He feels that things need change, and he voices what type of changes he would prefer. Maher separates subject matter alphabetically, and each letter has at least one entry while others contain up to 10 entries.

The book debuted at No. 10 on The New York Times Best Seller non-fiction list, Maher's first book to make the list.
