= Sarah de Gaudemar =

American animator

Sarah de Gaudemar, also known professionally as Sarah E. Meyer, is an animator who has worked on the animated television series Moral Orel, Robot Chicken (for which she won an Emmy in 2006), Green Screen Show, Phantom Investigators, Gary & Mike, The PJs, and Celebrity Deathmatch, and the feature film Davey & Goliath's Snowboard Christmas.

She is also credited with animating the "Robot Chicken Universe" (with fellow Robot Chicken animators Eileen Kohlhepp and Kelly Mazurowski) in the Family Guy episode "Road to the Multiverse."
