= When You Ride Alone You Ride with bin Laden =

2002 non-fiction book by Bill Maher

When You Ride Alone You Ride With bin Laden: What the Government Should Be Telling Us to Help Fight the War on Terrorism
- Author: Bill Maher
- Language: English
- Subject: American Politics
- Publisher: New Millennium
- Publication date: October 2002
- Publication place: United States
- Pages: 132
- ISBN: 1-59777-513-4
- OCLC: 176853657
- Preceded by: True Story: A Novel
- Followed by: New Rules: Polite Musings from a Timid Observer

When you ride ALONE you ride with bin Laden: What the Government SHOULD Be Telling Us to Help Fight the War on Terrorism (ISBN 1-59777-513-4) is a 2002 non-fiction political book by comedian and author Bill Maher. Maher targets American citizens in this publication and notes that the American people are much too wasteful, and while Maher mainly critiques the methods the United States is using to fight the war on terrorism, he also addresses issues such as oil dependency, environmental destruction, religion, the war on drugs and foreign relations.

In the book, Maher uses vintage World War II propaganda posters and manipulates the images to apply to the current issues facing the world and the United States, and he uses each image as the introduction to each new chapter and as the basis for several pages of writing. While written in a humorous style, the comments and suggestions that Maher makes that deal with global issues are serious and genuine. He mentions the Bush Doctrine, and says that if he were president, countries that harbor terrorists who bring nuclear weapons into the US will be considered to have fired a missile at the United States. Maher concludes the book with his analysis of how the United States has behaved in comparison to other superpowers in the past, and pushes the position that the US would have acted "better" than any other nation in such a position of power.

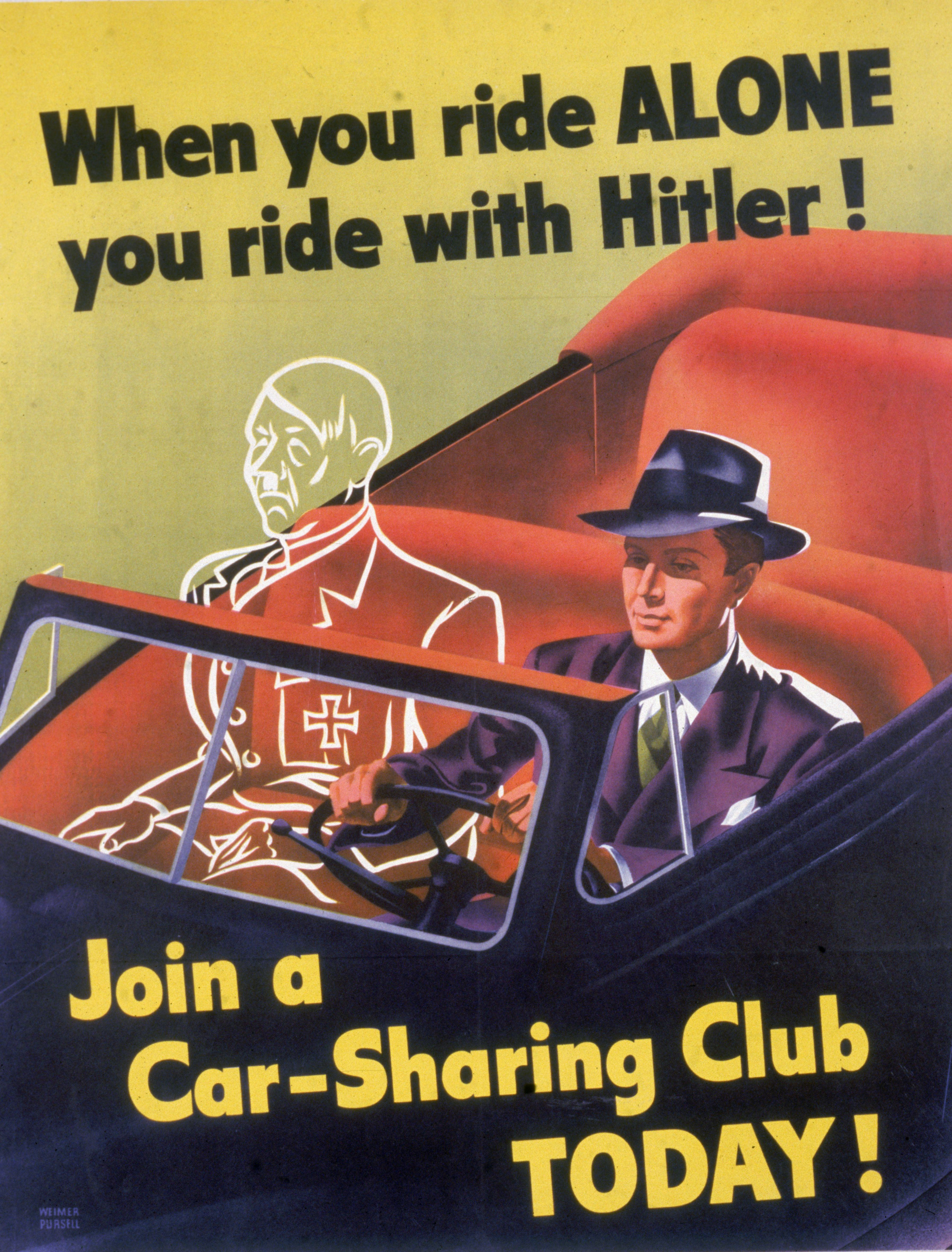
Original poster

The title of the book alludes to a World War II propaganda poster that read "When you ride ALONE you ride with Hitler !" (see left), which suggested that automobile owners carpool to conserve gasoline for the war effort.
