= Mechanism Digital =

Motion graphics production company

- Company type: Private company
- Industry: Film industry
- Founded: April 1996; 30 years ago
- Founder: Lucien Harriot
- Headquarters: New York, New York, United States
- Services: Visual Effects, Post-production, Production, New Media
- Website: www.mechanismdigital.com

Mechanism Digital is an American motion graphics production company based in New York City. Mechanism specializes in Visual Effects and 3-D Animation.

== History ==
Established by Lucien Harriot in 1996, Mechanism Digital is a digital production studio and a provider of visual effects for feature film, commercials and episodic television in New York City. The studio’s team of directors, artists and producers specializes in 3D animation, compositing, conceptual design, animated characters, digital environments and on-set VFX supervision.

Mechanism Digital’s credits include ‘Rome: Engineering an Empire’, which won an Emmy in 2007, and an animated promo for the movie Juno airing on Cinemax, which won an ADDY award in 2009.
