= Bill Maher: I'm Swiss =

- Genre: Stand-up comedy
- Written by: Bill Maher
- Starring: Bill Maher
- Country of origin: United States
- Original language: English

Original release
- Network: HBO
- Release: 2005

Bill Maher: I'm Swiss (and other Treasonous Statements) is the seventh HBO special by comedian Bill Maher.

The title is derived from a statement Maher made during the show in which, as a result of the embarrassment he feels as an American during the George W. Bush administration, he tells people that he is actually Swiss.

It was filmed on March 26, 2005, at The Arlene Schnitzer Concert Hall in Portland, Oregon; it was released on DVD November 1, 2005. His set included material covering George W. Bush, drug laws, gay marriage, 9/11, health and religion. There is also a segment where Maher 'translates' rap lyrics to a more profound, Caucasian dialect in what he calls 'Master P's Theatre'.
