= 50th Primetime Emmy Awards =

1998 American television programming awards

- Date: September 13, 1998 (Ceremony); August 29, 1998 (Creative Arts Awards)
- Location: Shrine Auditorium, Los Angeles, California
- Presented by: Academy of Television Arts and Sciences

Highlights
- Most awards: Major: Frasier; George Wallace; NYPD Blue (3); All: Frasier; 70th Academy Awards (5)
- Most nominations: ER; NYPD Blue (8)
- Outstanding Comedy Series: Frasier
- Outstanding Drama Series: The Practice
- Outstanding Miniseries: From the Earth to the Moon
- Outstanding Variety, Music or Comedy Series: Late Show with David Letterman

Television/radio coverage
- Network: NBC
- Produced by: Don Mischer

The 50th Primetime Emmy Awards were held on Sunday, September 13, 1998. It was broadcast on NBC. 27 awards were presented.

When Frasier was announced as the winner of Outstanding Comedy Series, Emmy history was made. The NBC sitcom became the first show to win one of the two main series prizes five consecutive years. This record has since been passed by The Daily Show with Jon Stewart, whose winning streak was ten years, but for the main two genres, it was not matched until 2014, when the ABC sitcom Modern Family won its fifth consecutive award for Outstanding Comedy Series. Frasier tied for the most major wins overall with three, and most overall wins with five.

The Practice won Outstanding Drama Series. For the second straight year, medical drama ER came into the night as the most nominated program, but once again walked away empty handed, going 0/8 in major categories.

Ally McBeal became the first hour-long series to be nominated for Outstanding Comedy Series since Love, American Style in 1971.

This year saw the Emmys move to a new venue, the Shrine Auditorium, marking the return of the award ceremony to Los Angeles for the first time since the 1976 Emmy Awards, following a 20-year residency at the Pasadena Civic Auditorium outside L.A. in Pasadena. The Shrine had hosted the 70th Academy Awards the previous march; the Oscars tied with Frasier with five overall awards, including two major awards.

As of the 2023 Emmy Awards ceremony, this is the last year where all the nominees for Outstanding Drama Series were from the broadcast networks.

== Winners and nominees ==
=== Programs ===
Outstanding Comedy Series: Frasier (NBC); 3rd Rock from the Sun (NBC); Ally McBeal (Fox); The Larry Sanders Show (HBO); Seinfeld (NBC)	Outstanding Drama Series: The Practice (ABC); ER (NBC); Law & Order (NBC); NYPD Blue (ABC); The X-Files (Fox)
Outstanding Variety, Music or Comedy Series: Late Show with David Letterman (CBS); Dennis Miller Live (HBO); Politically Incorrect with Bill Maher (ABC); The Tonight Show with Jay Leno (NBC); Tracey Takes On... (HBO)	Outstanding Variety, Music or Comedy Special: The 1997 Tony Awards (CBS); The 70th Annual Academy Awards (ABC); Christopher Reeve: A Celebration of Hope (ABC); Cinderella (ABC); Garth: Live from Central Park (HBO)
Outstanding Made for Television Movie: Don King: Only in America (HBO); 12 Angry Men (Showtime); A Bright Shining Lie (HBO); Gia (HBO); What the Deaf Man Heard (CBS)	Outstanding Miniseries: From the Earth to the Moon (HBO); George Wallace (TNT); Merlin (NBC); Moby Dick (USA); More Tales of the City (Showtime)

=== Acting ===
==== Lead performances ====
Outstanding Lead Actor in a Comedy Series: Kelsey Grammer as Dr. Frasier Crane in Frasier (NBC) (Episode: "Frasier's Imaginary Friend"); Michael J. Fox as Mike Flaherty in Spin City (ABC) (Episode: "The Goodbye Girl"); John Lithgow as Dr. Dick Solomon in 3rd Rock from the Sun (NBC) (Episode: "Stuck with Dick"); Paul Reiser as Paul Buchman in Mad About You (NBC) (Episode: "The Conversation"); Garry Shandling as Larry Sanders in The Larry Sanders Show (HBO) (Episode: "Flip")	Outstanding Lead Actress in a Comedy Series: Helen Hunt as Jamie Buchman in Mad About You (NBC) (Episode: "Moody Blues"); Kirstie Alley as Veronica Chase in Veronica's Closet (NBC) (Episode: "Pilot"); Ellen DeGeneres as Ellen Morgan in Ellen (ABC) (Episode: "Neighbors"); Jenna Elfman as Dharma Montgomery in Dharma & Greg (ABC) (Episode: "Haus Arrest"); Calista Flockhart as Ally McBeal in Ally McBeal (Fox) (Episode: "One Hundred Tears Away"); Patricia Richardson as Jill Taylor in Home Improvement (ABC) (Episode: "Bright Christmas")
Outstanding Lead Actor in a Drama Series: Andre Braugher as Frank Pembleton in Homicide: Life on the Street (NBC) (Episode: "Fallen Heroes", Part 2); David Duchovny as FBI Special Agent Fox Mulder in The X-Files (Fox) (Episode: "Redux II"); Anthony Edwards as Dr. Mark Greene in ER (NBC) (Episode: "Family Practice"); Dennis Franz as Andy Sipowicz in NYPD Blue (ABC) (Episode: "The One That Got Away"); Jimmy Smits as Bobby Simone in NYPD Blue (ABC) (Episode: "Lost Israel")	Outstanding Lead Actress in a Drama Series: Christine Lahti as Dr. Kate Austin in Chicago Hope (CBS) (Episode: "Cabin Fever"); Gillian Anderson as Dr. Dana Scully in The X-Files (Fox) (Episode: "All Souls"); Roma Downey as Monica in Touched by an Angel (CBS) (Episode: "The Spirit of Liberty Moon"); Julianna Margulies as Carol Hathaway in ER (NBC) (Episode: "Carter's Choice"); Jane Seymour as Dr. Michaela Quinn on Dr. Quinn, Medicine Woman (CBS) (Episode: "Point Blank")
Outstanding Lead Actor in a Miniseries or Movie: Gary Sinise as George Wallace in George Wallace (TNT); Jack Lemmon as Juror #8 in 12 Angry Men (Showtime); Sam Neill as Merlin in Merlin (NBC); Ving Rhames as Don King in Don King: Only in America (HBO); Patrick Stewart as Captain Ahab in Moby Dick (USA)	Outstanding Lead Actress in a Miniseries or Movie: Ellen Barkin as Glory Marie Jackson in Before Women Had Wings (ABC); Jamie Lee Curtis as Maggie Green in Nicholas' Gift (CBS); Judy Davis as Gladwyn Ritchie in The Echo of Thunder (CBS); Olympia Dukakis as Mrs. Anna Madrigal in More Tales of the City (Showtime); Angelina Jolie as Gia Carangi in Gia (HBO); Sigourney Weaver as Lady Claudia Hoffman in Snow White: A Tale of Terror (Showtime)
Outstanding Performance in a Variety or Music Program: Billy Crystal in The 70th Annual Academy Awards (ABC); Garth Brooks in Garth: Live from Central Park (HBO); Michael Crawford in Michael Crawford in Concert (PBS); Jay Leno in The Tonight Show with Jay Leno (NBC); David Letterman in Late Show with David Letterman (CBS); Tracey Ullman in Tracey Takes On... (HBO)

==== Supporting performances ====
Outstanding Supporting Actor in a Comedy Series: David Hyde Pierce as Dr. Niles Crane in Frasier (NBC) (Episodes: "The Maris Counselor" + "First Date"); Jason Alexander as George Costanza in Seinfeld (NBC) (Episode: "The Strike"); Phil Hartman as Bill McNeal in NewsRadio (NBC) (posthumously); Jeffrey Tambor as Hank Kingsley in The Larry Sanders Show (HBO); Rip Torn as Arthur in The Larry Sanders Show (HBO)	Outstanding Supporting Actress in a Comedy Series: Lisa Kudrow as Phoebe Buffay in Friends (NBC) (Episode: "The One with Ross's Wedding"); Christine Baranski as Maryann Thorpe in Cybill (CBS) (Episode: "The Golden Years"); Kristen Johnston as Sally Solomon in 3rd Rock from the Sun (NBC); Jane Leeves as Daphne Moon in Frasier (NBC) (Episodes: "Where Every Bloke Knows Your Name" + "First Date"); Julia Louis-Dreyfus as Elaine Benes in Seinfeld (NBC)
Outstanding Supporting Actor in a Drama Series: Gordon Clapp as Greg Medavoy in NYPD Blue (ABC); Héctor Elizondo as Dr. Phillip Watters in Chicago Hope (CBS) (Episodes: "Psychodrama" + "Bridge Over Troubled Watters"); Steven Hill as Adam Schiff in Law & Order (NBC); Eriq La Salle as Dr. Peter Benton in ER (NBC); Noah Wyle as Dr. John Carter in ER (NBC)	Outstanding Supporting Actress in a Drama Series: Camryn Manheim as Ellenor Frutt in The Practice (ABC) (Episodes: "Checkmate" + "Axe Murderer"); Kim Delaney as Diane Russell in NYPD Blue (ABC); Laura Innes as Dr. Kerry Weaver in ER (NBC); Della Reese as Tess in Touched by an Angel (CBS); Gloria Reuben as Jeanie Boulet in ER (NBC)
Outstanding Supporting Actor in a Miniseries or Movie: George C. Scott as Juror #3 in 12 Angry Men (Showtime); Hume Cronyn as Juror #9 in 12 Angry Men (Showtime); Gregory Peck as Father Mapple in Moby Dick (USA); Martin Short as Frik in Merlin (NBC); J. T. Walsh as Ray Percy in Hope (TNT)	Outstanding Supporting Actress in a Miniseries or Movie: Mare Winningham as Lurleen Wallace in George Wallace (TNT); Helena Bonham Carter as Morgan Le Fey in Merlin (NBC); Julie Harris as Leonora Nelson in Ellen Foster (CBS); Judith Ivey as Lucille in What the Deaf Man Heard (CBS); Angelina Jolie as Cornelia Wallace in George Wallace (TNT)

=== Directing ===
Outstanding Directing for a Comedy Series: The Larry Sanders Show (HBO): "Flip" – Todd Holland; 3rd Rock from the Sun (NBC): "Dick and the Other Guy" – Terry Hughes; Ally McBeal (Fox): "Cro-Magnon" – Allan Arkush; Ally McBeal (Fox): "Pilot" – James Frawley; Dharma & Greg (ABC): "Pilot" – James Burrows	Outstanding Directing for a Drama Series: Brooklyn South (CBS): "Pilot" – Mark Tinker; NYPD Blue (ABC): "Lost Israel", Part 2 – Paris Barclay; Chicago Hope (CBS): "Brain Salad Surgery" – Bill D'Elia; ER (NBC): "Ambush" – Thomas Schlamme; The X-Files (Fox): "The Post-Modern Prometheus" – Chris Carter
Outstanding Directing for a Variety or Music Program: The 70th Annual Academy Awards (ABC) – Louis J. Horvitz; Cinderella (ABC) – Robert Iscove; Fleetwood Mac: The Dance (MTV) – Bruce Gowers; Garth: Live from Central Park (HBO) – Marty Callner; Stomp Out Loud (HBO) – Luke Cresswell and Steve McNicholas; Tracey Takes On... (HBO): "Smoking" – Don Scardino	Outstanding Directing for a Miniseries or Movie: George Wallace (TNT) – John Frankenheimer; 12 Angry Men (Showtime) – William Friedkin; Don King: Only in America (HBO) – John Herzfeld; From the Earth to the Moon (HBO): "Part I" – Tom Hanks; Merlin (NBC) – Steve Barron

=== Writing ===
Outstanding Writing for a Comedy Series: The Larry Sanders Show (HBO): "Flip" – Peter Tolan and Garry Shandling; Ally McBeal (Fox): "Theme of Life" – David E. Kelley; Ellen (ABC): "Emma" – Lawrence Broch; Frasier (NBC): "The Ski Lodge" – Joe Keenan; The Larry Sanders Show (HBO): "Putting the 'Gay' Back in Litigation" – Richard Day, Alex Gregory and Peter Huyck	Outstanding Writing for a Drama Series: NYPD Blue (ABC): "Lost Israel", Part 2 – Story by : David Milch and Bill Clark Teleplay by : David Milch and Nicholas Wootton; Homicide: Life on the Street (NBC): "The Subway" – James Yoshimura; NYPD Blue (ABC): "Lost Israel", Part 1 – Story by : Ted Mann, Bill Clark and Meredith Stiehm Teleplay by : David Milch and Ted Mann; The Practice (ABC): "Betrayal" – David E. Kelley; The X-Files (Fox): "The Post-Modern Prometheus" – Chris Carter
Outstanding Writing for a Variety or Music Program: Dennis Miller Live (HBO); The Chris Rock Show (HBO); Late Night with Conan O'Brien (NBC); Late Show with David Letterman (CBS); Mr. Show with Bob and David (HBO)	Outstanding Writing for a Miniseries or Movie: Don King: Only in America (HBO) – Kario Salem; From the Earth to the Moon (HBO): "Part II" – Graham Yost; Gia (HBO) – Jay McInerney and Michael Cristofer; Merlin (NBC) – Story by : Edward Khmara Teleplay by : David Stevens and Peter Barnes; More Tales of the City (Showtime) – Nicholas Wright

== Most major nominations ==
Networks with multiple major nominations (Note: "Major" constitutes the categories listed above: Program, Acting, Directing, and Writing. Does not include the technical categories.)
Network	No. of Nominations
NBC	49
HBO	29
ABC	25
CBS	19
Fox	13

Programs with multiple major nominations
Program	Category	Network	No. of Nominations
ER	Drama	NBC	8
NYPD Blue	Drama	ABC	8
The Larry Sanders Show	Comedy	HBO	7
Merlin	Miniseries	NBC	6
12 Angry Men	Movie	Showtime	5
Ally McBeal	Comedy	Fox	5
Frasier	Comedy	NBC	5
George Wallace	Miniseries	TNT	5
The X-Files	Drama	Fox	5
3rd Rock from the Sun	Comedy	NBC	4
Don King: Only in America	Movie	HBO	4
The 70th Annual Academy Awards	Variety	ABC	3
Chicago Hope	Drama	CBS	3
From the Earth to the Moon	Miniseries	HBO	3
Garth: Live from Central Park	Variety	HBO	3
Gia	Movie	HBO	3
Late Show with David Letterman	Variety	CBS	3
Moby Dick	Miniseries	USA	3
More Tales of the City	Miniseries	Showtime	3
The Practice	Drama	ABC	3
Seinfeld	Comedy	NBC	3
Tracey Takes On...	Variety	HBO	3
Cinderella	Variety	ABC	2
Dennis Miller Live	Variety	HBO	2
Dharma & Greg	Comedy	ABC	2
Ellen	Comedy	ABC	2
Homicide: Life on the Street	Drama	NBC	2
Law & Order	Drama	NBC	2
Mad About You	Comedy	NBC	2
The Tonight Show with Jay Leno	Variety	NBC	2
Touched by an Angel	Drama	CBS	2
What the Deaf Man Heard	Movie	CBS	2

== Most major awards ==
Networks with multiple major awards
Network	No. of Awards
ABC	8
HBO	6
NBC	6
CBS	4
TNT	3

Programs with multiple major awards
Program	Category	Network	No. of Awards
Frasier	Comedy	NBC	3
George Wallace	Miniseries	TNT	3
NYPD Blue	Drama	ABC	3
The 70th Annual Academy Awards	Variety	ABC	2
Don King: Only in America	Movie	HBO	2
The Larry Sanders Show	Comedy	HBO	2
The Practice	Drama	ABC	2

== In Memoriam ==
Patrick Stewart presented a clip tribute to the TV actors who had died: Red Skelton, Shari Lewis, Lloyd Bridges, Roy Rogers, singer John Denver, Robert Young, dancer Jerome Robbins, sports narrator Harry Caray, Frank Sinatra, singer Buffalo Bob, E. G. Marshall, J. T. Walsh, Sonny Bono, Phil Hartman, and Chris Farley. As an interesting note, Gary Sinise won the award for Outstanding Lead Actor in a Miniseries or Movie for his portrayal of George Wallace on the day that the latter died.
