= Primetime Emmy Award for Outstanding Picture Editing for Variety Programming =

Television award category

- Awarded for: Outstanding Picture Editing for Variety Programming
- Country: United States
- Presented by: Academy of Television Arts & Sciences
- Currently held by: The Muppet Show (2026)
- Website: emmys.com

The Primetime Emmy Award for Picture Editing for Variety Programming is awarded to one television series each year. From 2012 to 2015, the category was called Outstanding Picture Editing for Short-Form Segments and Variety Specials. Prior to 2012, short-form segments and variety specials competed independently of one another.

In the following list, the first titles listed in gold are the winners; those not in gold are nominees, which are listed in alphabetical order. The years given are those in which the ceremonies took place.

== Winners and nominations ==
indicates the winner

Outstanding Videotape Editing for a Limited Series or a Special

=== 1970s ===
Year	Program	Nominees	Network
1976
1976	Alice Cooper: The Nightmare (In Concert)	Nick V. Giordano	ABC
1976	The Hemingway Play (Hollywood Television Theatre)	Roy Stewart	PBS
1976	Mitzi... Roarin' in the 20's'	Rex Bagwell, Frank Phillips	CBS
1976	Texaco Presents: A Quarter Century of Bob Hope on Television	Hal Collins, Danny White	NBC
1977
1977	American Bandstand's 25th Anniversary	Gary Anderson	ABC
1977	The Barry Manilow Special	William H. Breshears, Thomas Klein	ABC
1977	The Captain and Tennille Special	Susan Jenkins, Manuel Martinez,	ABC
1977	The Dorothy Hamill Special	Jimmy B. Frazier, Danny White	ABC
1977	The Neil Diamond Special	Barbara Babcock, William H. Breshears	NBC
1977	Victory at Entebbe	Mike Gavaldon, James McElroy, David Saxon	ABC
1978
1978	The Sentry Collection Presents Ben Vereen: His Roots	Pam Marshall, Andy Zall	ABC
1978	The Carpenters...Space Encounters	Jimmy B. Frazier	ABC
1978	The Goldie Hawn Special	Ed J. Brennan	CBS
1978	Superstunt	Harvey W. Berger, Jimmy B. Frazier, Terry Greene, Marco Zappia	NBC
1978	Texaco Presents: Bob Hope in a Very Special Special	Chip Brooks, Hal Collins	NBC
1979	Outstanding Video Tape Editing for a Limited Series or a Special		
1979	The Scarlet Letter ("Part 2")	Ken Denisoff, Tucker Wiard, Janet McFadden	PBS
1979	The Cheryl Ladd Special	Andy Zall	ABC
1979	Liberace: A Valentine Special	Marco Zappia	CBS
1979	The Muppets Go Hollywood	Darryl Sutton	CBS
1979	Outstanding Individual Achievement - Special Class (Note: As a juried award, nominees had to garner 50% approval to win the award. The nominee did not meet the benchmark and no award was given.)		
1979	The 51st Annual Academy Awards	Terry Pickford, Michael L. Wenig	ABC
1979	The Television Annual: 1978/1979	David W. Foster, Eddie C. Joseph	ABC

=== 1980s ===
Year	Program	Nominees	Network
1980 (32nd)	Outstanding Video Tape Editing for a Limited Series or a Special		
1980 (32nd)	Olivia Newton-John: Hollywood Nights	Danny White	ABC
1980 (32nd)	Baryshnikov on Broadway	Andy Zall	ABC
1980 (32nd)	The Donna Summer Special	Terry Climer	ABC
1980 (32nd)	Perry Como's Christmas in New Mexico	Marco Zappia	ABC
1980 (32nd)	Outstanding Individual Achievement - Special Class (Note: As a juried award, nominees had to garner 50% approval to win the award. The nominee did not meet the benchmark and no award was given.)		
1980 (32nd)	Bob Hope's Overseas Christmas Tours: Around the World with the Troops — 1941-1972	Darryl Sutton	NBC
1981
1981	Perry Como's Christmas in the Holy Land	Branda Miller, Marco Zappia	ABC
1981	The American Film Institute Salute to Fred Astaire	Harvey W. Berger, Andy Schubert	CBS
1981	Diana	Terry W. Greene, Ron Menzies	CBS
1981	John Schneider: Back Home	Pam Marshall	CBS
1981	The Tom and Dick Smothers Brothers Special I	Raymond M. Bush	NBC
1982 (32nd)	Outstanding Video Tape Editing for a Limited Series or a Special		
1982 (32nd)	American Bandstand's 30th Anniversary Special	William H. Breshears, Pam Marshall, Tucker Ward	ABC
1982 (32nd)	Ain't Misbehavin'	Ed J. Brennan	NBC
1982 (32nd)	Lily for President?	Jimmy B. Frazier, Ken Laski	CBS
1982 (32nd)	Perry Como's French-Canadian Christmas	Pam Marshall	ABC
1982 (32nd)	Working (American Playhouse)	Roy Stewart	PBS
1982 (32nd)	Outstanding Individual Achievement - Creative Special Achievement		
1982 (32nd)	Shirley MacLaine... Illusions	Andy Zall	CBS
1983
1983	Special Bulletin	Arden Rynew	NBC
1983	Big Bird in China	Ken Gutstein	NBC
1983	David Frost Presents: The Fourth International Book of World Records	Ken Denisoff	ABC
1983	Motown 25: Yesterday, Today, Forever	Danny White	NBC
1984
1984	AFI Life Achievement Award: A Tribute to Lillian Gish	Jim McQueen, Catherine Shields	CBS
1984	The Best of Everything	Branda Miller, Marco Zappia	NBC
1984	The Chemical People	Catherine Hughes, Vern Oakley, Christine Ochtun, Nicholas Spies	PBS
1984	New York City Ballet's Tribute to George Balanchine (Live from Lincoln Center)	Frank C. Cernese, Matty Powers	PBS
1984	Perry Como's Christmas in New York	Pam Marshall	ABC
1984	The Stars Salute the U.S. Olympic Team	Manuel Martinez	NBC
1984	Super Night of Rock 'N Roll	David Fairfield, Mark West, Andy Zall	NBC
1985
1985	Sweeney Todd (Great Performances)	Jimmy B. Frazier	PBS
1985	David Frost Presents: The Fifth International Book of World Records	Jeff Bass, Roger Berger, Bruce Gowers, Michael Sachs, Marco Zappia	ABC
1985	Motown Returns to the Apollo	Frank Mazzaro, Mark West	NBC
1985	Olympic Gala	Michael L. Weitzman	ABC
1985	Perry Como's Christmas in England	Kris Trexler	ABC

Outstanding Editing for a Miniseries or a Special (Multi-Camera Production)

Year	Program	Nominees	Network
1986
1986	American Bandstand's 33-1/3 Celebration	Pam Marshall	ABC
1986	Neil Diamond... Hello Again	Kevin Fernan, Mark West	CBS
1987
1987	Happy Birthday, Hollywood	Kris Trexler	ABC
1987	Minnelli on Minnelli: Liza Remembers Vincente	Steven Hess, Vic Lowrey	PBS
1987	The Pointer Sisters... Up All Nite	Mark Fernan, Mark West	NBC
1988
1988	Julie Andrews... The Sound of Christmas	Bob Jenkis, Mark West, Andy Zall	ABC
1988	The Barbara Walters Specials ("Glenn Close, Oprah Winfrey and Cher")	Mark Oberthaler, Ann Woodward	ABC
1988	Plaza Suite	Robert Bernstein	ABC
1988	Willie Nelson, Texas Style	Pam Marshall	CBS
1989
1989	Dance in America: Gregory Hines — Tap Dance in America (Great Performances)	Mark West	PBS
1989	The 50th Barbara Walters Special	Mark Oberthaler, Ann Woodward	ABC
1989	Disney/MGM Studios Theme Park Grand Opening	Terry Climer, Jeff Palmer, Kris Trexler	NBC
1989	Late Night with David Letterman's 7th Anniversary Special	George Magda	NBC
1989	A Raisin in the Sun (American Playhouse)	Gary Anderson	PBS

=== 1990s ===
Year	Program	Nominees	Network
1990
1990	The Best of The Tracey Ullman Show	M. Pam Blumenthal, Douglas Hines, Brian K. Roberts	Fox
1990	Dance in America: Bob Fosse — Steam Heat (Great Performances)	Girish Bhargava	PBS
1990	Julie & Carol: Together Again	Kris Trexler	ABC
1990	Sammy Davis Jr.'s 60th Anniversary Celebration	Keith Fernandes, Donn Hoyer, Michael Kelly, Barney Robinson, Maria Schlatter, David Vernon	ABC
1990	Seinfeld ("The Stake Out")	Robert Souders	NBC
1991
1991	The Muppets Celebrate Jim Henson	Girish Bhargava, David Gumpel	CBS
1991	The Best of Disney: 50 Years of Magic	Harry Arends, Bruce Bailey, Kevin Miller, Robert P. Schneider, Mark West	ABC
1991	Cheers: 200th Anniversary Special	Andy Ackerman	NBC
1991	The Magic of David Copperfield XIII: Mystery on the Orient Express	Ray Miller, Tony Teresi, George Verschoor	CBS
1991	Red, Hot & Blue	Harry Arends, David Fairfield, Booey Kober, Bruce Motyer	ABC

Outstanding Multi-Camera Picture Editing for a Miniseries, Movie or a Special

Year	Program	Nominees	Network
1992
1992	The Magic of David Copperfield XIV: Flying — Live the Dream	Ray Miller, Jeff U'Ren	CBS
1992	Cirque du Soleil II: A New Experience	Vidal Beique	HBO
1992	Sting at the Hollywood Bowl	Michael Burlingame, Sean Fullan	Disney Channel
1993
1993	The Magic of David Copperfield XV: Fires of Passion	Larry Lyman, Ray Miller, Jeff U'Ren	CBS
1993	Bob Hope: The First 90 Years	Harry Arends, David Blewitt, Susan Eisner, Eve Gage, James R. Hardy, Floyd Ingram, Rick Piccini, Robert P. Schneider, Douglass M. Stewart Jr.	NBC
1993	The Carol Burnett Show: A Reunion	Robert Bernstein	CBS
1993	Dance in America: The Hard Nut (Great Performances)	Girish Bhargava	PBS
1993	For Our Children: The Concert	Michael Polito	Disney Channel
1993	Rowan and Martin's Laugh-In: 25th Anniversary Reunion	Tim Amyx, Cary Gries, Donn Hoyer, Mark Raudonis, Barney Robinson	NBC
1994
1994	David Copperfield: 15 Years of Magic	Alan Carter, Ray Miller, Mike Satterfield, David D. Williams	CBS
1994	Carol Burnett: The Special Years	Robert Bernstein, Evan Wright	CBS
1994	Porgy and Bess (American Playhouse / Great Performances)	St. John O'Rorke	PBS
1994	Rowan and Martin's Laugh-In: A Valentine's Day Special	Tim Amyx, Cary Gries, Donn Hoyer, Mick Kollins, Barney Robinson	NBC
1994	Tracey Ullman Takes On New York	Michael Hunt	HBO
1995
1995	The Magic of David Copperfield XVI: Unexplained Forces	Ray Miller, Jeff U'Ren	CBS
1995	Barbra Streisand: The Concert	Bruce Motyer	HBO
1995	Eagles: Hell Freezes Over	Stan Kellam	MTV
1995	Sinatra: Duets	Donn Hoyer, Ned Kerwin, Valerie Remy, Barney Robinson, Laurie Schmidt	CBS
1995	Tibor Rudas Presents The Three Tenors in Concert 1994	Ray Miller	PBS
1996
1996	20 Years of Comedy on HBO	Mark West	HBO
1996	Kelsey Grammer Salutes Jack Benny	Ray Miller, Leslie Tong	NBC
1996	The Kennedy Center Honors	Michael Polito	CBS
1996	Pavarotti on Miami Beach	Tim Clark, Floyd Ingram, Richard J. Piccini	PBS
1996	Sinatra: 80 Years My Way	Beth Gallagher, Donn Hoyer, Nikole Hoyer, Ned Kerwin, Maria S. Schlatter	ABC
1997
1997	The Kennedy Center Honors	Randy Magalski, Mark Muheim, Michael Polito, Catherine Shields, Joe Wiedenmeyer	CBS
1997	Bette Midler: Diva Las Vegas	Troy Okoniewski, Jeff U'Ren	HBO
1997	Disney's Beauty and the Beast: A Concert on Ice	Ron Barr, Steve Binder	CBS
1997	Happy Birthday Elizabeth: A Celebration of Life	Michael Polito	ABC
1997	Robert Altman's Jazz '34: Remembrances of Kansas City Swing (Great Performances)	Brent Carpenter, Dylan Tichenor	PBS
1998
1998	Stomp Out Loud	Richard Daws, Jason Porthouse	HBO
1998	AMC Salute to Film Noir	Floyd Ingram	AMC
1998	Garth Brooks: Ireland and Back	Michael Salomon	NBC
1998	The Kennedy Center Honors	Barbara S. Ballow, Randy Magalski, Mark Muheim, Michael Polito, Joe Wiedenmayer	CBS
1998	Quincy Jones... The First 50 Years	Alan Carter, Randy Magalski	ABC
1998	Variety and Virtuosity: American Ballet Theatre Now (Great Performances)	Girish Bhargava	PBS
1999
1999	The Kennedy Center Honors	Barbara S. Ballow, Randy Magalski, Mark Muheim, Michael Polito, Joe Wiedenmayer	CBS
1999	Celine Dion: These Are Special Times	Booey Kober	CBS
1999	Disney's Young Musician's Symphony Orchestra	Bruce Motyer	Disney Channel
1999	The Kennedy Center Presents: A Tribute to Muddy Waters	Sean Fullan	PBS
1999	Late Show with David Letterman: Fifth Anniversary Special	Steve Babb, Tom Catusi, Keith Debetham, Michael Goldsmith, Mark Spada	CBS
1999	The World's Greatest Magic V	Ray Miller	NBC

=== 2000s ===
Year	Program	Nominees	Network
2000
2000	A Supernatural Evening with Santana	Bill DeRonde	Fox
2000	The 72nd Annual Academy Awards	Patrick Clancey, Bruce Hepler, Mark Intravartolo, Alexandra Komisaruk, Joan La Duca, Randy Magalski, Tom McQuade, Michael Polito, Andy Ralston, Michael J. Shapiro, Matthew Sharp, Douglass M. Stewart Jr., Paula S. Vannucci, Steve Welch, Jeremy Workman, Chuck Workman	ABC
2000	AFI's 100 Years...100 Stars	Sue "Spyke" Hirshon, Barry A. O'Brien, Tim Preston	CBS
2000	Chris Rock: Bigger and Blacker	Grady Cooper	HBO
2000	Here's to You, Charlie Brown: 50 Great Years!	Brian Schnuckel	CBS
2001
2001	Bruce Springsteen & The E Street Band: Live in New York City	Thom Zimny	HBO
2001	The 73rd Annual Academy Awards	June Beallor, Jon Bloom, Maura Corey, Brian Derby, Glenn Erickson, Alexandra Komisaruk, Mark Leiss, Maureen Nolan, Barry A. O'Brien, Michael Polito, Jeff Roe, Michael J. Shapiro, Matthew Sharp, Douglass M. Stewart Jr., Yoram Tal, Chuck Workman	ABC
2001	Barbra Streisand: Timeless	Michael Polito	Fox
2001	Elton John: One Night Only – Greatest Hits Live	Dave Gardener, Tim Kelly, Booey Kober	CBS
2001	Hendrix	Nancy Richardson	Showtime
2002
2002	A&E in Concert: Sting in Tuscany ...All This Time	Scott C. Wilson	A&E
2002	The 74th Annual Academy Awards	Doug Abel, Lewis Cohen, Kyle Cooper, Ben Daughtrey, Bill DeRonde, Beth Dewey, Jeffrey Doe, Sean Fanton, Susan Franco, Justine Gerenstein, William Goldenberg, Michael Johnson, Alexandra Komisaruk, Barnaby Levy, Dave Maguire, Paul Marengo, Richard Marks, Errol Morris, Geoff Nelson, Tia Nolan, Barry A. O'Brien, Michael Polito, Meg Reticker, Jeff Roe, Gary Ross, Terilyn Shropshire, Brian Smith, Douglass M. Stewart Jr., Yoram Tal, Brent White, Danielle White, Chuck Workman, John Zimmer	ABC
2002	Come Together: A Night for John Lennon's Words and Music	Ron Andreassen, Eric Singer, Eli Tishberg	TNT
2002	Janet Jackson: In Concert from Hawaii	Michael Polito, Ryan Polito, Jeff Roe	HBO
2002	John Leguizamo's Sexaholix... A Love Story	Chad Callner	HBO
2002	U2 Elevation 2001: Live from Boston	Guy Harding, Brian McCue, Tim Qualtrough	VH1
2003
2003	AFI's 100 Years... 100 Passions: America's Greatest Love Stories	Debra Light, Barry A. O'Brien, Tim Preston	CBS
2003	The 75th Annual Academy Awards	Jon Bloom, John Burridge, Tony Cacciarelli, Maura Corey, Brian Derby, Karen Erickson, Susan Franco, Radu Ion, Alexandra Komisaruk, Paul Marengo, Dirk Meenen, Michael Polito, Jeff Roe, Phil Savenick, Michael J. Shapiro, Matthew Sharp, Mark Stepp, Douglass M. Stewart Jr., Yoram Tal, Paula S. Vannucci, John Wesley Whitton, Lucas Wilson, Chuck Workman, John Zimmer	ABC
2003	Bruce Springsteen & The E Street Band: Live in Barcelona	Thom Zimny	CBS
2003	The 25th Annual Kennedy Center Honors	John Francis, Anny Meza, Mark Muheim, Mike Polito, Yoram Tal, Joseph Wiedenmayer	CBS
2003	Paul McCartney's Back in the U.S.	Jason Brandenberg, Niven Howie, Zoran Jevremov	ABC
2004
2004	A&E in Concert: Paul McCartney in Red Square	Lance Cain, Zoran Jevremov	A&E
2004	A&E in Concert: Sting – Sacred Love	Chris Osterhus, Scott Richter	A&E
2004	The 76th Annual Academy Awards	Cole Barager, Jon Bloom, Tony Cacciarelli, Gus Comegys, Brian Derby, Bill DeRonde, Beth Dewey, Karen Erickson, Kevin Finn, John Francis, Dean Holland, Tiffany Hope, Eric Hornberger, Scott Kirby, Paul Marengo, Dirk Meenen, Troy Miller, Michael Polito, Ryan Polito, Jeff Roe, Joe Saccone, Michael J. Shapiro, Matthew Sharp, Andrew Solt, Mark Stepp, John Sterneman, Douglass M. Stewart Jr., Yoram Inon Tal, Ray Wolf, Chuck Workman, John Zimmer	ABC
2004	AFI Life Achievement Award: A Tribute to Robert De Niro	Debra Light, Adam "Chip" Pauken, Mike Polito, Ryan Polito, Thelma Schoonmaker, Martin Scorsese, Yoram Inon Tal	USA
2004	Friends: The One Before The Last One — 10 Years of Friends	Todd Felker, Sven Nilsson, Stephen Prime, Kenny Tintorri	NBC

Outstanding Picture Editing for a Special (Single or Multi-Camera)

Year	Program	Episode	Nominees	Network
2005
2005	Eric Clapton: Crossroads Guitar Festival (Great Performances)		Gary Bradley	PBS
2005	The 77th Annual Academy Awards		Martin Apelbaum, June Beallor, Carsten Becker, Jon Bloom, Tony Cacciarelli, Tim Carras, Gus Comegys, Kyle Cooper, Kimberly Cooper, Maura Corey, Brian Derby, Beth Dewey, Karen Erickson, Shawn Fedorchuk, John Francis, Scott Kirby, Josh Laurence, Barnaby Levy, Paul Marengo, David J. Martell, David E. Miller, Paul Nesmith, Barry A. O'Brien, Michael Polito, Ryan Polito, Jeff Roe, Michael J. Shapiro, Matthew Sharp, John Sterneman, Douglass M. Stewart Jr., Carol Streit, Yoram Inon Tal, Chuck Workman, John Zimmer	ABC
2005	Dave Chappelle: For What It's Worth		Jeff U'Ren	Showtime
2005	The Games of the XXVIII Olympiad: Opening Ceremony		Jim Bell, Phil Chalmers, Patrice Freymond, Jim O'Farrell	NBC
2005	Tracey Ullman: Live and Exposed		Tammis Chandler	HBO
2006
2006	The Kennedy Center Honors		Anny Meza, Michael Polito, Catherine Shields, John Zimmer	CBS
2006	The 78th Annual Academy Awards		June Beallor, Jon Bloom, Troy Miller, Michael Polito, Michael J. Shapiro, Douglass M. Stewart Jr., Chuck Workman	ABC
2006	Bill Maher: I'm Swiss		Sara Aderhold, El Armstrong	HBO
2006	A Concert for Hurricane Relief		Rico Bolognino, Jim Jenkin, Paul Musilli, Sean Sohl, Barry Spitzer	NBC
2006	Dance in America: Swan Lake with the American Ballet Theatre (Great Performances)		Girish Bhargava	PBS
2006	The XX Olympic Winter Games: Opening Ceremony		Patrice Freymond, Jim O'Farrell, Rachel Pillar, Howard Tate, Don Vermeulen	NBC
2007
2007	Ciruq Du Solei: Corteo		Sylvain Lebel	Bravo
2007	The 79th Annual Academy Awards		Michael Polito, Jeff Roe, Douglass M. Stewart Jr., Kyle Cooper, Neil Travis, Chuck Workman, Steve Sidwell	ABC
2007	Lewis Black: Red, White & Screwed		Jeff U'Ren	HBO
2007	Tony Bennett: An American Classic		Wyatt Smith	NBC
2007	A Tribute to James Taylor (Great Performances)		Gary Bradley, Laura Young	PBS
2008
2008	Outstanding Picture Editing for a Special (Single or Multi-Camera)			
2008	Justin Timberlake: FutureSex/LoveShow		Michael D. Schultz, Jim Kelly, Chad Callner	HBO
2008	AFI Life Achievement Award: A Tribute to Al Pacino		Michael Polito, Pi Ware, Narumi Inatsugo, Tim Pernieiaro, Mark Stepp	USA
2008	Company (Great Performances)		Gary Bradley	PBS
2008	Movies Rock		Mark Stepp, Chester Contaoi, Bill Morris	CBS
2008	We Love Ella! A Tribute to the First Lady of Song (Great Performances)		Gary Bradley, Laura Young	PBS
2008	Outstanding Short-Form Picture Editing			
2008	American Idol	"David Cook Goes Home (733)"	Bill DeRonde, Oren Castro	Fox
2008	Jimmy Kimmel Live!	"I'm F***ing Matt Damon (5th Year Anniversary Show)"	James Crowe	ABC
2008	The 80th Annual Academy Awards	"Oscar Show Tribute Sequence"	Chuck Workman	ABC
2008	Dancing with the Stars	"Head to Head Package (610)"	David Timoner	ABC
2008	Jimmy Kimmel Live!	"I'm F***ing Ben Affleck (After the Academy Awards)"	Jason Bielski	ABC
2009
2009	Outstanding Picture Editing for a Special (Single or Multi-Camera)			
2009	Chris Rock: Kill the Messenger		Michael D. Schultz	HBO
2009	AFI Life Achievement Award: A Tribute to Warren Beatty		Michael Polito, Pi Ware, Oren Castro	USA
2009	A Colbert Christmas: The Greatest Gift of All		Jason Baker	Comedy Central
2009	The Kennedy Center Honors		Michael Polito	CBS
2009	Ricky Gervais: Out Of England — The Stand-Up Special		Booey Kober	HBO
2009	Outstanding Short-Form Picture Editing			
2009	The 81st Annual Academy Awards		Kyle Cooper, Hal Honigsberg	ABC
2009	Stand Up to Cancer		David Brodie, Andy Grieve	ABC, CBS, NBC
2009	The Daily Show with Jon Stewart	"13098"	Graham Frazier	Comedy Central
2009	The Daily Show with Jon Stewart	"13109"	Einar Westerlund	Comedy Central
2009	Dancing with the Stars	"710A"	David Timoner	ABC

=== 2010s ===
Year	Program	Episode	Nominees	Network
2010
2010	Outstanding Picture Editing for a Special (Single or Multi-Camera)			
2010	The 25th Anniversary Rock and Roll Hall of Fame Concert		Bill DeRonde, John Zimmer, Mark Stepp, Michael Polito	HBO
2010	Kathy Griffin: Balls of Steel		David Foster	Bravo
2010	The Kennedy Center Honors		Michael Polito	CBS
2010	Robin Williams: Weapons of Self Destruction		Michael D. Schultz	HBO
2010	Outstanding Short-Form Picture Editing			
2010	Late Night with Jimmy Fallon	"6-Bee"	Christopher Tartaro	NBC
2010	The 82nd Annual Academy Awards	"Horror Tribute"	Kabir Akhtar	ABC
2010	The 82nd Annual Academy Awards	"John Hughes Tribute"	Jon Bloom, Bayard Stryker	ABC
2010	American Idol	"Dream"	Oren Castro	Fox
2010	Jimmy Kimmel Live!	"The Handsome Men's Club"	Brian Marsh	ABC
2010	Jimmy Kimmel Live!	"The Late Night Wars"	Kevin McCullough	ABC
2011
2011	Outstanding Picture Editing for a Special (Single or Multi-Camera)			
2011	Lady Gaga Presents the Monster Ball Tour: At Madison Square Garden		Mike Polito, Bill DeRonde, Kevin O'Dea, Katie Hetland	HBO
2011	Carrie Fisher in Wishful Drinking		Marc Cohen	HBO
2011	Louis C.K.: Hilarious		Louis C.K.	Epix
2011	Ricky Gervais: Out Of England 2 — The Stand-Up Special		David W. Foster	HBO
2011	Thurgood		Michael Polito	HBO
2011	Outstanding Short-Form Picture Editing			
2011	The 2010 ESPY Awards	"Images Piece"	Matt O'Connor, Anthony Marchegiano	ESPN
2011	The 83rd Annual Academy Awards	"Opening Film"	Kabir Akhtar	ABC
2011	The 83rd Annual Academy Awards	"This Year's Unintentional Musicals"	Evan Gregory, Michael Gregory	ABC
2011	American Idol	"Top 3 Results Show: Scotty's Home Story"	Oren Castro	Fox
2011	Jimmy Kimmel Live!	"After The Academy Awards: The President's Speech"	Brian Marsh	ABC

Outstanding Picture Editing for Short-Form Segments and Variety Specials

Year	Program	Episode	Nominees	Network
2012	2012 Rock and Roll Hall of Fame Induction Ceremony		Bill DeRonde, Chris Lovett, Mark Stepp, Pi Ware, John Zimmer, Ben Folts	HBO
2012	The 84th Annual Academy Awards	"Opening Film" (segment)	Kabir Akhtar	ABC
2012	The Colbert Report	"Stephen Colbert Occupies Wall Street" (segment)	Andrew Matheson	Comedy Central
2012	The Daily Show with Jon Stewart	"A Love Supreme: Profanity & Nudity on TV" (segment)	Eric Davies	Comedy Central
2012	Extreme Makeover: Home Edition	"Rise and Honor: A Veterans Day Special"	Matt Deitrich, Josh Young, Ken Yankee, Jacob Parsons, Jennifer Nelson, Anita Crouch, Tim Leavitt	ABC
2012	Louis C.K.: Live at the Beacon Theater		Louis C.K.	FX
2013	The Daily Show with Jon Stewart	"Australia & Gun Control's Aftermath (Part 3)" (segment)	Einar Westerlund	Comedy Central
2013	The Colbert Report	"CGI University" (segment)	Jason Baker	Comedy Central
2013	London 2012 Olympic Games Opening Ceremony	"Happy & Glorious" (segment)	Sascha Dhillon	NBC
2013	Louis C.K.: Oh My God		Louis C.K.	HBO
2013	Saturday Night Live	"Lincoln" (segment)	Adam Epstein	NBC

Outstanding Picture Editing for Variety Programming

Year	Program	Episode	Nominees	Network
2014	The Daily Show with Jon Stewart	"McConnelling" (segment)	Eric Davies	Comedy Central
2014	AFI Life Achievement Award: A Tribute to Mel Brooks		Michael Polito, Debra Light, Thomas Mitchell, Dave Brown, Pi Ware	TNT
2014	Billy Crystal: 700 Sundays		Kent Beyda	HBO
2014	The Colbert Report	"People Destroying America: Vicco Mayor Johnny Cummings" (segment)	Christein Aromando	Comedy Central
2014	The Colbert Report	"StePhfest Colbchella `013 - Daft Punk'd" (segment)	Jason Baker	Comedy Central
2015	The Colbert Report	"Farewell Colbert" (segment)	Jason Baker	Comedy Central
2015	Conan	"Conan in Cuba"	Robert James Ashe, Chris Heller, Dave Grecu	TBS
2015	Key & Peele	"Scariest Movie Ever"	Christian Hoffman, Richard LaBrie, Phil Davis	Comedy Central
2015	Last Week Tonight with John Oliver	"N.S.A. Edward Snowden" (segment)	Ryan Barger	HBO
2015	Late Show with David Letterman	"Finale Montage" (segment)	Mark Spada, Andrew Evangelista, Dan Baggio, Stephen Hostomsky	CBS
2016	Last Week Tonight with John Oliver	"Public Defenders" (segment)	Anthony Miale	HBO
2016	Conan	"Conan in Korea"	Robert James Ashe, Chris Heller, Dave Grecu, Meaghan Wilbur	TBS
2016	Drunk History	"Inventors"	Jody McVeigh-Schultz	Comedy Central
2016	Key & Peele	"The End"	Richard LaBrie, Neil Mahoney, Nicholas Monsour, Stephen Waichulis	Comedy Central
2016	Lemonade		Bill Yukich	HBO
2017
2017	Last Week Tonight with John Oliver	"F*ck 2016" (segment)	Anthony Miale	HBO
2017	Conan	"Conan in Berlin"	Robert James Ashe, Chris Heller, Dave Grecu, Meaghan Wilbur	TBS
2017	Drunk History	"Bar Fights"	Aaron Morris	Comedy Central
2017	Last Week Tonight with John Oliver	"Stoplight" (segment)	Ryan Barger	HBO
2017	Saturday Night Live	"Kellyanne Conway" (segment)	Adam Epstein	NBC
2018
2018	Last Week Tonight with John Oliver	"Border Patrol" (segment)	Ryan Barger	HBO
2018	Carpool Karaoke Primetime Special 2018		Brad Conlin & Tom Jarvis	CBS
2018	Dave Chappelle: Equanimity		Jeff U'ren	Netflix
2018	Drunk History	"Heroines"	John Cason	Comedy Central
2018	Full Frontal with Samantha Bee Presents: The Great American* Puerto Rico (*It's Complicated)		Jesse Coane, Charles Divak, Daphne Gomez-Mena, Andrew Mendelson, Tennille Uithof	TBS
2018	Last Week Tonight with John Oliver	"Wax President Harding" (segment)	Anthony Miale	HBO
2019
2019	Last Week Tonight with John Oliver	"The Wax & The Furious" (segment)	Ryan Barger	HBO
2019	Carpool Karaoke: When Corden Met McCartney Live from Liverpool		Tom Jarvis	CBS
2019	Drunk History	"Are You Afraid of the Drunk?"	John Cason	Comedy Central
2019	Last Week Tonight with John Oliver	"The Journey Of ChiiJohn" (segment)	Anthony Miale	HBO
2019	Who Is America?	"Episode 102"	Vera Drew, Eric Notarnicola, Roger Nygard, Matt Davis and Jeremy Cohen	Showtime

=== 2020s ===
Year	Program	Episode	Nominees	Network
2020
2020	Last Week Tonight with John Oliver	"Eat Sh!t, Bob!" (segment)	Ryan Barger	HBO
2020	The Daily Show with Trevor Noah	"Trump's Coronavirus Address (Bloopers Included) and Trevor's Audience Tribute Song"	Mike Choi, Tom Favilla, Nikolai Johnson, Mark Paone, Erin Shannon, Catherine Trasborg, Einar Westerlund and Robert York	Comedy Central
2020	Dave Chappelle: The Kennedy Center Mark Twain Prize For American Humor		Brad Gilson, Chester G Contaoi, Jon Alloway, Pi Ware and Brian Forbes	PBS
2020	Dave Chappelle: Sticks & Stones		Jeff U'Ren	Netflix
2020	Last Week Tonight with John Oliver	"The Journey of ChiiJohn: Chapter 2" (segment)	Anthony Miale	HBO
2021
2021	A Black Lady Sketch Show	"Sister, May I Call You Oshun?"	Daysha Broadway, Stephanie Filo, Jessica Hernández	HBO
2021	Bo Burnham: Inside		Bo Burnham	Netflix
2021	Hamilton		Jonah Moran	Disney+
2021	Last Week Tonight with John Oliver	Trump & Election Results / F*ck 2020" (segment)	Ryan Barger and Anthony Miale	HBO
2021	Saturday Night Live	"Murder Show" (segment)	Ryan Spears	NBC
2021	Saturday Night Live	"Stu" (segment)	Ryan McIlraith	NBC
2022
2022	A Black Lady Sketch Show	"Save My Edges, I'm a Donor!"	Stephanie Filo, Bradinn French, Taylor Joy Mason and S. Robyn Wilson	HBO
2022	Conan	"Series Finale"	Robert James Ashe, Mike Api, Christopher P. Heller and Matthew Shaw	TBS
2022	The Daily Show with Trevor Noah	"Jordan Klepper Takes on "Wellness" Anti-Vaxxers + Fringewatching Rep. Lauren Boebert"	Storm Choi, Eric Davies, Tom Favilla, Lauren Beckett Jackson, Nikolai Johnson, Ryan Middleton, Mark Paone, Erin Shannon, Catherine Trasborg and Einar Westerlund	Comedy Central
2022	Harry Potter 20th Anniversary: Return to Hogwarts		Simon Bryant, Jim Clark, James Collett, Bill DeRonde, Asaf Eisenberg, Will Gilby, Lior Linevitz–Matthews, Pablo Noe, Tim Perniciaro and Jacob Proctor	HBO Max
2022	Last Week Tonight with John Oliver	"The Confesstigators (segment)"	Anthony Miale	HBO
2023
2023	A Black Lady Sketch Show	"My Love Language Is Words of Defamation"	Stephanie Filo, Malinda Zehner Guerra and Taylor Joy Mason	HBO
2023	Carol Burnett: 90 Years of Laughter + Love		Mike Polito and Timothy Schultz	NBC
2023	The Daily Show with Trevor Noah	"Jordan Klepper Shows Trump Supporters January 6th Hearing Clips"	Storm Choi, Eric Davies, Tom Favilla, Lauren Beckett Jackson, Nikolai Johnson, Ryan Middleton, Mark Paone, Erin Shannon, Catherine Trasborg and Einar Westerlund	Comedy Central
2023	History of the World, Part II	"III"	Angel Gamboa Bryant, Stephanie Filo, Daniel Flesher and George Mandl	Hulu
2023	Saturday Night Live	"HBO Mario Kart Trailer (segment)"	Ryan Spears and Christopher Salerno	NBC
2024	Outstanding Picture Editing for Variety Programming			
2024	John Mulaney Presents: Everybody's in LA	"Paranormal"	Kelly Lyon, Sean McIlraith and Ryan McIlraith	Netflix
2024	Dolly Parton's Pet Gala		Bill DeRonde, James Collet, Kari Heavenrich and Stavros Stavropoulos	CBS
2024	Nikki Glaser: Someday You'll Die		Guy Harding	HBO
2024	Ramy Youssef: More Feelings		Joanna Naugle	HBO
2024	Tig Notaro: Hello Again		Kelly Lyon	Prime Video
2024	Outstanding Picture Editing for Variety Programming (Segment)			
2024	The Daily Show	"The Dailyshowography of Vivek Ramaswamy: Enter the RamaVerse"	Catherine Trasborg	Comedy Central
2024	Last Week Tonight with John Oliver	"Boeing"	Anthony Miale	HBO
2024	Last Week Tonight with John Oliver	"The Sad Tale of Henry the Engine"	Ryan Barger	HBO
2024	Saturday Night Live	"Bowen's Straight"	Paul Del Gesso and Kristie Ferriso	NBC
2024	Saturday Night Live	"I'm Just Pete"	Ryan Spears	NBC
2025	Outstanding Picture Editing for Variety Programming			
2025	Cunk on Life		Damon Tai and Jason Boxall	Netflix
2025	Ali Wong: Single Lady		Sean Hubbert	Netflix
2025	Bill Burr: Drop Dead Years		Kelly Lyon	Hulu
2025	Conan O'Brien: The Kennedy Center Mark Twain Prize for American Humor		Bill DeRonde and Timothy Schultz	Netflix
2025	Your Friend, Nate Bargatze		Sean Hubbert	Netflix
2025	Outstanding Picture Editing for Variety Programming (Segment)			
2025	SNL50: The Anniversary Special	"Physical Comedy"	Ryan Spears, Paul Del Gesso, Christopher Salerno, Daniel Garcia, Sean McIlraith and Ryan McIlraith	NBC
2025	The Daily Show	"The Dailyshowography of Kamala Harris: Just Normal"	Lauren Beckett Jackson	Comedy Central
2025	The Daily Show	"The Dailyshowography of Stephen Miller: What He Does in the Shadows"	Storm Choi	Comedy Central
2025	Last Week Tonight with John Oliver	"Facebook Content Moderation"	Anthony Miale	HBO
2025	Last Week Tonight with John Oliver	"That Stuff's American"	Ryan Barger	HBO
2026	Outstanding Picture Editing for Variety Programming			
2026	The Muppet Show		Kelly Lyon	Disney+
2026	Nikki Glaser: Good Girl		Guy Harding	Hulu
2026	Ramy Youssef: In Love		Joanna Naugle	HBO
2026	Taylor Swift | The Eras Tour | The Final Show		Dom Whitworth, Rupa Rathod, Benjamin Wainwright-Pearce, Michael Heubel and Hamish Lyons	Disney+
2026	Wanda Sykes: Legacy		Angel Gamboa Bryant	Netflix
2026	Outstanding Picture Editing for Variety Programming (Segment)			
2026	The Late Show with Stephen Colbert	"The Late Show closes out its storied run at the Ed Sullivan Theater with help from Paul McCartney and Elvis Costello"	Andrew Matheson and Amanda Sprecher	CBS
2026	The Daily Show	"RFK Hospital: An Original Series Inspired by the Medical Advice of RFK Jr."	Nikolai Johnson	Comedy Central
2026	Last Week Tonight with John Oliver	"Moon Mammoths Game Documentary"	Ryan Barger	HBO
2026	Saturday Night Live	"Home Alone"	Ryan Spears	NBC
2026	Saturday Night Live	"MAHAspital (The New Pitt)"	Christopher Salerno and Mak Makower	NBC

== Programs with multiple awards ==
5 wins

- Last Week Tonight with John Oliver

3 wins

- A Black Lady Sketch Show

2 wins

- The Daily Show with Jon Stewart

== Programs with multiple nominations ==
17 nominations

- Last Week Tonight with John Oliver

12 nominations

- The Daily Show

9 nominations

- Saturday Night Live

5 nominations

- The Colbert Report
- Jimmy Kimmel Live!

4 nominations

- Conan
- Drunk History

3 nominations

- American Idol
- A Black Lady Sketch Show

2 nominations

- Carpool Karaoke
- Dancing with the Stars
- Key & Peele
- Late Show with David Letterman
