= 60th Primetime Creative Arts Emmy Awards =

2008 American television programming awards

- Date: September 13, 2008
- Location: Nokia Theatre; Los Angeles, California
- Presented by: Academy of Television Arts & Sciences
- Most awards: John Adams (8)
- Most nominations: John Adams (15)

Television/radio coverage
- Network: E!

The 60th Primetime Creative Arts Emmy Awards honored the best in artistic and technical achievement in American prime time television programming from June 1, 2007, until May 31, 2008, as chosen by the Academy of Television Arts & Sciences. The awards were presented on September 13, 2008, at the Nokia Theatre in Los Angeles, California. The ceremony was hosted by Neil Patrick Harris and Sarah Chalke and was broadcast by E! on September 20, preceding the 60th Primetime Emmy Awards on September 21. In total, 79 Creative Arts Emmys were presented across 75 categories.

John Adams won eight Emmys to lead all programs at the ceremony. It was followed by Mad Men with four wins and 30 Rock, the 50th Annual Grammy Awards, and The War with three wins each. John Adams also received the most nominations, with 15 in total. In the overall program fields, winners included The 61st Annual Tony Awards, American Masters, Autism: The Musical, Classical Baby, Eric Clapton Crossroads Guitar Festival Chicago, Kathy Griffin: My Life on the D-List, Mr. Warmth: The Don Rickles Project, New York City Opera: Madama Butterfly, Nick News with Linda Ellerbee, The Simpsons, South Park, This American Life, and White Light/Black Rain, among others. While ABC led all networks with 50 nominations, HBO took home the most awards with 16 Emmys.

== Winners and nominees ==
Winners are listed first, highlighted in boldface, and indicated with a double dagger (‡). (Note: The outlets listed for each program are the U.S. broadcasters or streaming services identified in the nominations, which for some international productions are different than the broadcaster(s) that originally commissioned the program.) Sections are based upon the categories listed in the 2007–2008 Emmy rules and procedures. Area awards and juried awards are denoted next to the category names as applicable. (Note: Area awards are non-competitive and nominees are considered on their own terms. Any nominee with at least two-thirds approval received an Emmy. If no nominee received two-thirds approval, the nominee with the highest approval (and a minimum majority approval) received an Emmy.; Juried awards generally do not have nominations; instead, all entrants were screened before members of the appropriate peer group, and one, more than one, or no entry was awarded an Emmy based on the jury's vote.) For simplicity, producers who received nominations for program awards have been omitted.

=== Programs ===
Programs
**Outstanding Variety, Music or Comedy Special**: **Mr. Warmth: The Don Rickles Project (HBO)**‡; Bill Maher: The Decider (HBO); George Carlin: It's Bad for Ya! (HBO); James Taylor: One Man Band (Great Performances) (PBS); Kathy Griffin: Straight to Hell (Bravo); The Kennedy Center Honors (CBS)	**Outstanding Special Class – Awards Programs (Area)**: **The 61st Annual Tony Awards (CBS)**‡; 80th Annual Academy Awards (ABC)
**Outstanding Special Class – Not-Exclusively-Made-for-Television Variety, Music, Comedy Event Programs (Area)**: **Eric Clapton Crossroads Guitar Festival Chicago (Great Performances) (PBS)**‡	**Outstanding Special Class – Classical Music/Dance Programs (Area)**: **New York City Opera: Madama Butterfly (Live from Lincoln Center) (PBS)**‡
**Outstanding Reality Program**: **Kathy Griffin: My Life on the D-List (Bravo)**‡; Antiques Roadshow (PBS); Dirty Jobs (Discovery Channel); Extreme Makeover: Home Edition (ABC); Intervention (A&E)	**Outstanding Children's Program (Area)**: **Classical Baby (I'm Grown Up Now): The Poetry Show (HBO)**‡; **Nick News with Linda Ellerbee: The Untouchable Kids of India (Nickelodeon)**‡; Hannah Montana (Disney Channel); High School Musical 2 (Disney Channel); The Suite Life of Zack and Cody (Disney Channel)
**Outstanding Animated Program (For Programming Less Than One Hour)**: **The Simpsons: "Eternal Moonshine of the Simpson Mind" (Fox)**‡; Creature Comforts America: "Don't Choke to Death, Please" (CBS); King of the Hill: "Death Picks Cotton" (Fox); Robot Chicken: "Robot Chicken: Star Wars" (Cartoon Network); SpongeBob SquarePants: "Inmates of Summer / Two Faces of Squidward" (Nickelodeon)	**Outstanding Animated Program (For Programming One Hour or More) (Area)**: **Imaginationland (South Park) (Comedy Central)**‡; Blue Harvest (Family Guy) (Fox); Justice League: The New Frontier (Warner Bros. on Demand)
**Outstanding Nonfiction Series (Area)**: **American Masters (PBS)**‡; **This American Life (Showtime)**‡; Biography (Biography Channel); Deadliest Catch (Discovery Channel); Inside the Actors Studio (Bravo)	**Outstanding Nonfiction Special (Area)**: **Autism: The Musical (HBO)**‡; AFI's 100 Years...100 Movies – 10th Anniversary Edition (CBS); Alive Day Memories: Home from Iraq (HBO); Pioneers of Television – Late Night: Johnny, Jack, Steve, and Merv (PBS); The Pixar Story (Starz)
**Exceptional Merit in Nonfiction Filmmaking (Juried)**: **White Light/Black Rain (HBO)**‡; Oswald's Ghost (American Experience) (PBS); Walt Whitman (American Experience) (PBS)	**Outstanding Special Class – Short-Format Live-Action Entertainment Programs (Area)**: **Battlestar Galactica – Razor Featurette #4 (Sci Fi Channel.com)**‡; 30 Rock: Kenneth the Web Page (NBC.com); Friday Night Lights: Spotlight on Austin (NBC.com); Lost: Missing Pieces (ABC.com); Sarah Silverman Program Nugget (Comedycentral.com)
**Outstanding Special Class – Short-Format Animated Programs (Area)**: **Camp Lazlo: "Lazlo's First Crush" (Cartoon Network)**‡; Chowder: "Burple Nurples" (Cartoon Network)	**Outstanding Special Class – Short-Format Nonfiction Programs (Area)**: **Great Moments from the Campaign Trail (History Channel / VOD)**‡; Deadliest Catch: The Real Dutch (Discovery.com); Jay Leno's Garage (Jaylenosgarage.com)
**Outstanding Interactive Media Programming – Interactive Fiction (Juried) (Note: Finalists were announced for this juried category; they are not considered to be nominees.)**: **The Heroes Digital Experience**‡; ABC Family's Kyle XY: The Collective Experience; HBO Voyeur; The L Word Initiative; Lost Find 815	**Outstanding Interactive Media Programming – Interactive Nonfiction (Juried)**: **Disney Channel Games Digital Media Event**‡; America's Player Interactive; Bravo Media's Project Runway; Bravo Media's Top Chef; Dancing with the Stars Multi-Platform Experience

=== Performing ===
Performing
**Outstanding Guest Actor in a Comedy Series**: **Tim Conway – 30 Rock as Bucky Bright (NBC)**‡; Will Arnett – 30 Rock as Devin Banks (NBC); Shelley Berman – Curb Your Enthusiasm as Nat David (HBO); Steve Buscemi – 30 Rock as Len (NBC); Rip Torn – 30 Rock as Don Geiss (NBC)	**Outstanding Guest Actress in a Comedy Series**: **Kathryn Joosten – Desperate Housewives as Karen McCluskey (ABC)**‡; Polly Bergen – Desperate Housewives as Stella Wingfield (ABC); Edie Falco – 30 Rock as Celeste "C.C." Cunningham (NBC); Carrie Fisher – 30 Rock as Rosemary Howard (NBC); Sarah Silverman – Monk as Marci Maven (USA); Elaine Stritch – 30 Rock as Colleen Donaghy (NBC)
**Outstanding Guest Actor in a Drama Series**: **Glynn Turman – In Treatment as Alex Sr. (HBO)**‡; Charles Durning – Rescue Me as John Gavin, Sr. (FX); Robert Morse – Mad Men as Bertram Cooper (AMC); Oliver Platt – Nip/Tuck as Freddie Prune (FX); Stanley Tucci – ER as Dr. Kevin Moretti (NBC); Robin Williams – Law & Order: Special Victims Unit as Merritt Rook (NBC)	**Outstanding Guest Actress in a Drama Series**: **Cynthia Nixon – Law & Order: Special Victims Unit as Janis Donovan (NBC)**‡; Ellen Burstyn – Big Love as Nancy Dutton (HBO); Diahann Carroll – Grey's Anatomy as Jane Burke (ABC); Sharon Gless – Nip/Tuck as Colleen Rose (FX); Anjelica Huston – Medium as Cynthia Keener (NBC)
**Outstanding Voice-Over Performance (Juried)**: **Keith David – The War: "A Necessary War" as narrator (PBS)**‡

=== Animation ===
Animation
**Outstanding Individual Achievement in Animation (Juried)**
- **Creature Comforts America: "Self Image / Winging It / Art" – Teresa Drilling (CBS)**‡
- **Foster's Home for Imaginary Friends: "Mondo Coco" – Ben Balistreri (Cartoon Network)**‡

=== Art Direction ===
Art Direction
**Outstanding Art Direction for a Multi-Camera Series**: **How I Met Your Mother: "The Yips" / "No Tomorrow" / "Miracles" – Stephan Olson and Susan Eschelbach (CBS)**‡; The New Adventures of Old Christine: "Between a Rock and a Hard Place" / "The New Adventures of Old Christine" / "House" – Cabot McMullen and Amy Feldman (CBS)	**Outstanding Art Direction for a Single-Camera Series**: **Mad Men: "Smoke Gets in Your Eyes" – Bob Shaw, Henry Dunn, and Rena DeAngelo (AMC)**‡; Dexter: "That Night, A Forest Grew" – Tony Cowley and Linda Spheeris (Showtime); Heroes: "Out of Time" – Ruth Ammon, Matthew Jacobs, and Ron Franco (NBC); Mad Men: "Shoot" – Dan Bishop, Christopher Brown, and Amy Wells (AMC); Pushing Daisies: "Pie-lette" – Michael Wylie, William Durrell, Jr., and Halina Siwolop (ABC); Ugly Betty: "How Betty Got Her Grieve Back" – Mark Worthington, Jim Wallis, and Archie D'Amico (ABC)
**Outstanding Art Direction for a Miniseries or Movie (Area)**: **John Adams – Gemma Jackson, David Crank, Christina Moore, Kathy Lucas, and Sarah Whittle (HBO)**‡; The Andromeda Strain – Jerry Wanek, Dan Hermansen, and Merline Dervisevic (A&E); Cranford (Masterpiece) – Donal Woods and Trisha Edwards (PBS); Recount – Patti Podesta, Christopher Tandon, and Radha Mehta (HBO); Tin Man – Michael Joy, Paulo Venturi, and Mark Lane (Sci Fi Channel)	**Outstanding Art Direction for Variety, Music or Nonfiction Programming (Area)**: **80th Annual Academy Awards – Roy Christopher and Joe Celli (ABC)**‡; 50th Annual Grammy Awards – Steve Bass, Brian Stonestreet, and Alana Billingsley (CBS); Hell's Kitchen: "Episode 401" – John R. Janavs, Robert Frye, and Stephen Paul Fackrell (Fox); MADtv: "Episode 1315" – Nicole Elespuru, James Yarnell, and Daryn Reid Goodall (Fox); 2007 MTV Video Music Awards – Scott Storey, Joe Celli, and James Connelly (MTV)

=== Casting ===
Casting
**Outstanding Casting for a Comedy Series**: **30 Rock – Jennifer McNamara Shroff (NBC)**‡; Californication – Felicia Fasano and Pat McCorkle (Showtime); Curb Your Enthusiasm – Allison Jones (HBO); Pushing Daisies – Camille Patton, Meg Liberman, and Jennifer Lare (ABC); Ugly Betty – Jeff Greenberg and Mark Scott (ABC)	**Outstanding Casting for a Drama Series**: **Damages – Julie Tucker, Ross Meyerson, and Avy Kaufman (FX)**‡; Brothers & Sisters – Jeanie Bacharach and Gillian O'Neill (ABC); Friday Night Lights – Linda Lowy, John Brace, and Beth Sepko (NBC); Mad Men – Kim Miscia, Beth Bowling, Laura Schiff, and Carrie Audino (AMC); The Tudors – Nuala Moiselle, Frank Moiselle, Mary Jo Slater, Steve Brooksbank, and Stephanie Gorin (Showtime)
**Outstanding Casting for a Miniseries, Movie or a Special**: **John Adams – Kathleen Chopin, Nina Gold, and Tracy Kilpatrick (HBO)**‡; The Bronx Is Burning – Billy Hopkins, Paul Schnee, and Hopkins, Smith & Barden Casting (ESPN); The Company – Denise Chamian, Scout Masterson, Diane Kerbel, Priscilla John, and Zsolt Csutak (TNT); Cranford (Masterpiece) – Maggie Lunn (PBS); Recount – David Rubin, Richard Hicks, Lori S. Wyman, and Kathleen Chopin (HBO)

=== Choreography ===
Choreography
**Outstanding Choreography (Juried)**
- **So You Think You Can Dance: "Hummingbird and Flower" / "The Chairman's Waltz" – Wade Robson (Fox)**‡
  - Dancing with the Stars: "Mambo" / "Para Los Rumberos" – Julianne Hough (ABC)
  - High School Musical 2: "What Time Is It?" / "Fabulous" / "Work This Out" / "I Don't Dance" / "You Are the Music in Me" / "For One" – Kenny Orgeta, Charles Klapow, and Bonnie Story (Disney Channel)
  - So You Think You Can Dance – "Table" / "Sweet Dreams (Are Made of This)" – Mandy Moore (Fox)
  - So You Think You Can Dance – "Transformers" / "Fuego" – Shane Sparks (Fox)

=== Cinematography ===
Cinematography
**Outstanding Cinematography for a Half-Hour Series**: **Californication: "Pilot" – Peter Levy (Showtime)**‡; 30 Rock: "Rosemary's Baby" – Vanja Cernjul (NBC); According to Jim: "The Chaperone" – George Mooradian (ABC); In Treatment: "Sophie – Week Six" – Fred Murphy (HBO); My Name Is Earl: "Stole a Motorcycle" – Michael Goi (NBC); Scrubs: "My Princess" – John Inwood (NBC)	**Outstanding Cinematography for a One Hour Series**: **Mad Men: "Smoke Gets in Your Eyes" – Phil Abraham (AMC)**‡; Battlestar Galactica: "Razor" – Stephen McNutt (Sci Fi Channel); Breaking Bad: "Pilot" – John Toll (AMC); Dexter: "The British Invasion" – Romeo Tirone (Showtime); Lost: "The Constant" – John Bartley (ABC); Rescue Me: "Babyface" – Tom Houghton (FX)
**Outstanding Cinematography for a Miniseries or Movie**: **John Adams: "Independence" – Tak Fujimoto (HBO)**‡; The Andromeda Strain: "Part 1" – Jon Joffin (A&E); Bernard and Doris – Mauricio Rubinstein (HBO); The Company: "Part 1" – Ben Nott (TNT); John Adams: "Don't Tread on Me" – Tak Fujimoto and Danny Cohen (HBO); Sense & Sensibility (Masterpiece): "Part 1" – Sean Bobbitt (PBS)	**Outstanding Cinematography for Nonfiction Programming**: **Deadliest Catch: "No Mercy" – cinematography team (Discovery Channel)**‡; Autism: The Musical – Tricia Regan (HBO); Ice Road Truckers: "Ready to Roll" – cinematography team (History Channel); Meerkat Manor: "Journey's End" – Ted Giffords, John Waters, and Ralph Bower (Animal Planet); This American Life: "Escape" – Adam Beckman (Showtime)
**Outstanding Cinematography for Reality Programming**: **Carrier: "Rites of Passage" – Axel Baumann, Robert Hanna, Ulli Bonnekamp, Mark Brice, and Wolfgang Held (PBS)**‡; The Amazing Race: "Honestly, They Have Witch Powers or Something" – Per Larsson, Sylvester Campe, Tom Cunningham, Lucas Kenna Mertes, and Peter Rieveschl (CBS); Project Runway: "En Garde!" – Derth Adams, Malkuth "Mo" Frahm, John Armstrong, Marcus Bleecker, and David Vlasits (Bravo); Survivor: "Just Don't Eat the Apple" – cinematography team (CBS); Top Chef: "Finale (Part 1)" – Paul Starkman (Bravo)

=== Commercial ===
Commercial
**Outstanding Commercial**
- **"Swear Jar" – Hungry Man and DDB Chicago (Bud Light)**‡
  - "Brother of the Bride" – PYTKA and Leo Burnett (Hallmark)
  - "Carrier Pigeons" – MJZ and BBDO New York (FedEx)
  - "Delivery" – MJZ and Fallon (Travelers)
  - "It's Mine" – MJZ and Wieden+Kennedy (Coca-Cola)

=== Costumes ===
Costumes
**Outstanding Costumes for a Series**: **The Tudors: "Episode 202" – Joan Bergin, Susan O'Connor Cave, and Gabriel O'Brien (Showtime)**‡; Desperate Housewives: "In Buddy's Eyes" – Catherine Adair, Joyce Unruh Goodwin, and Karo Vartanian (ABC); Mad Men: "Smoke Gets in Your Eyes" – John A. Dunn and Lisa Padovani (AMC); Pushing Daisies: "Pie-lette" – Mary Vogt and Stephanie Fox-Kramer (ABC); Ugly Betty: "Bananas for Betty" – Eduardo Castro and Michael Chapman (ABC)	**Outstanding Costumes for a Miniseries, Movie or a Special**: **John Adams: "Reunion" – Donna Zakowska, Amy Andrews Harrell, and Clare Spragge (HBO)**‡; Bernard and Doris – Joseph G. Aulisi and Autumn Saville (HBO); Comanche Moon: "Part 2" – Van Broughton Ramsey and Betsey Potter (CBS); Cranford (Masterpiece): "Part One" – Jenny Beavan and Mark Ferguson (PBS); Tin Man: "Night 1" – Angus Strathie and Sandra J. Blackie (Sci Fi Channel)
**Outstanding Costumes for a Variety/Music Program or a Special (Juried)**: **Frank TV: "Ballpark Frank" – Shanna Knecht and Elizabeth Tagg (TBS)**‡

=== Directing ===
Directing
**Outstanding Directing for Nonfiction Programming**
- **This American Life: "Escape" – Christopher Wilcha and Adam Beckman (Showtime)**‡
  - The Amazing Race: "Honestly, They Have Witch Powers or Something" – Bertram van Munster (CBS)
  - Autism: The Musical – Tricia Regan (HBO)
  - Project Runway: "En Garde!" – Tony Sacco (Bravo)
  - The War: "Pride of Our Nation" – Ken Burns and Lynn Novick (PBS)

=== Hairstyling ===
Hairstyling
**Outstanding Hairstyling for a Single-Camera Series**: **Mad Men: "Shoot" – Gloria Pasqua Casny, Lucia Mace, Anthony Wilson, and Barbara Cantu (AMC)**‡; Desperate Housewives: "In Buddy's Eyes" – Gabor Heiligenberg, Dena Green, James Dunham, and Maria Fernandez DiSarro (ABC); Dirty Sexy Money: "The Bridge" – Dennis Parker, Polly Lucke, Kay Majerus, and Anna Maria Orzano (ABC); Pushing Daisies: "Smell of Success" – Daniel Curet and Yuko Tokunaga-Koach (ABC); Tracey Ullman's State of the Union: "Episode 104" – Martin Samuel (Showtime); Ugly Betty: "A Nice Day for a Posh Wedding" – Mary Ann Valdes, Lynda K. Walker, Norma Lee, and Kimi Messina (ABC)	**Outstanding Hairstyling for a Multi-Camera Series or a Special**: **Saturday Night Live: "Host: Tina Fey" – Bettie O. Rogers, AnneMichelle Radcliffe, and Jodi Mancuso (NBC)**‡; Dancing with the Stars: "Episode 510A" – Mary Guerrero, Lucia Mace, Cynthia P. Romo, and Maria Valdivia (ABC); Two and a Half Men: "City of Great Racks" – Pixie Schwartz, Krista Borrelli, Ralph M. Abalos, and Janice Zoladz (CBS)
**Outstanding Hairstyling for a Miniseries or a Movie**: **Cranford (Masterpiece) – Alison Elliott (PBS)**‡; Bernard and Doris – Robin Maginsky Day and Milton Buras (HBO); John Adams – Jan Archibald and Loulia Sheppard (HBO); Tin Man – Anji Bemben and Linda Jones (Sci Fi Channel)

=== Lighting Direction ===
Lighting Direction
**Outstanding Lighting Direction (Electronic, Multi-Camera) for Variety, Music or Comedy Programming**
- **50th Annual Grammy Awards – Robert A. Dickinson, Matt Firestone, and Andy O'Reilly (CBS)**‡
  - 80th Annual Academy Awards – Robert A. Dickinson, Robert Barnhart, and Andy O'Reilly (ABC)
  - Dancing with the Stars: "Episode 510A" – Simon Miles (ABC)
  - Late Night with Conan O'Brien: "Episode 2518" – Fred Bock (NBC)
  - Late Show with David Letterman: "Episode 2843" – Stephen Brill and Tim Stephenson (CBS)

=== Main Title Design ===
Main Title Design
**Outstanding Main Title Design**
- **Mad Men – Mark Gardner, Steve Fuller, and Cara McKenney (AMC)**‡
  - Bernard and Doris – Garson Yu, Synderela Peng, Etsuko Uji, and Edwin Baker (HBO)
  - Chuck – Karin Fong, Jonathan Gershon, and Dana Yee (NBC)
  - The Company – Matthew Mulder, Ryan Gagnier, Igor Choromanski, Cody Cobb, and Noah Conopask (TNT)
  - New Amsterdam – Johanna Marciano, Wendy Brovetto, and Bryan Keeling (Fox)

=== Makeup ===
Makeup
**Outstanding Makeup for a Single-Camera Series (Non-Prosthetic)**: **Tracey Ullman's State of the Union: "Episode 102" – Sally Craven and Matthew Mungle (Showtime)**‡; CSI: Crime Scene Investigation: "Dead Doll" – Melanie Elaine Levitt, Tom Hoerber, Matthew Mungle, and Clinton Wayne (CBS); Grey's Anatomy: "Crash Into Me – Parts 1 & 2" – Norman Leavitt, Brigitte Bugayong, Shauna Giesbrecht, and Michele Teleis (ABC); Mad Men: "The Hobo Code" – Debbie Zoller, Ron Pipes, and Suzanne Diaz (AMC); Pushing Daisies: "Dummy" – Todd A. McIntosh, David De Leon, and Bradley M. Look (ABC)	**Outstanding Makeup for a Multi-Camera Series or Special (Non-Prosthetic)**: **Dancing with the Stars: "Episode 503" – Melanie Mills, Zena Shteysel, Patti Ramsey Bortoli, and Nadege Schoenfeld (ABC)**‡; MADtv: "Episode 1308: With Kathy Griffin" – Jennifer Aspinall, Heather Mages, Christopher Burgoyne, and Ned Neidhardt (Fox); So You Think You Can Dance: "Episode 311" – Amy Strozzi, Heather Cummings, Tifanie White, and Crystal Wolfchild (Fox); Two and a Half Men: "City of Great Racks" – Janice Berridge, Peggy Nichols, Shelly Woodhouse-Collins, and Gabriel Solana (CBS)
**Outstanding Makeup for a Miniseries or a Movie (Non-Prosthetic)**: **Tin Man – Lisa Love and Rebecca Lee (Sci Fi Channel)**‡; The Andromeda Strain – Connie Parker, Jill Bailey, and Lise Kuhr (A&E); Comanche Moon – Tarra Day, Karen McDonald, and Jessie Brown (CBS); John Adams – Trefor Proud and John R. Bayless (HBO)	**Outstanding Prosthetic Makeup for a Series, Miniseries, Movie or a Special (Area)**: **John Adams – Trefor Proud, John R. Bayless, Christopher Burgoyne, and Matthew Mungle (HBO)**‡; Grey's Anatomy: "Forever Young" – Norman Leavitt, Brigitte Bugayong, Thomas Burman, and Bari Dreiband-Burman (ABC); Mad Men: "Nixon vs. Kennedy" – Debbie Zoller, Joel Harlow, Brian Penikas, and Jake Garber (AMC); Pushing Daisies: "Smell of Success" – Todd A. McIntosh, David De Leon, and Sara De Pue (ABC); Tracey Ullman's State of the Union: "Episode 104" – Sally Craven and Matthew Mungle (Showtime)

=== Music ===
Music
**Outstanding Music Composition for a Series (Original Dramatic Score)**: **Pushing Daisies: "Pigeon" – Jim Dooley (ABC)**‡; Family Guy: "Lois Kills Stewie" – Ronald Neal Jones (Fox); House: "Guardian Angels" – Jon Ehrlich and Jason Derlatka (Fox); Little People, Big World: "Roloff Road Trip: Grand Canyon" – Joey Newman (TLC); Lost: "The Constant" – Michael Giacchino (ABC); The Simpsons: "Treehouse of Horror XVIII" – Alf Clausen (Fox)	**Outstanding Music Composition for a Miniseries, Movie or a Special (Original Dramatic Score)**: **The Company: "Night 1" – Jeff Beal (TNT)**‡; Bernard and Doris – Alex Wurman (HBO); John Adams: "Independence" – Rob Lane (HBO); Masters of Science Fiction: "Jerry Was a Man" – Laura Karpman (ABC); Oprah Winfrey Presents: Mitch Albom's For One More Day – Lennie Niehaus (ABC); Sense & Sensibility (Masterpiece) – Martin Phipps (PBS)
**Outstanding Music Direction**: **Movies Rock – Steve Jordan and Mark Watters (CBS)**‡; 80th Annual Academy Awards – Bill Conti (ABC); Barry Manilow: Songs from the Seventies – Ron Walters, Jr. (PBS); Christmas in Washington – Ian Fraser (TNT); 50th Annual Grammy Awards – Rickey Minor (CBS)	**Outstanding Original Music and Lyrics**: Jimmy Kimmel Live! – "I'm F***ing Matt Damon" by Sarah Silverman, Tony Barbieri, Wayne McClammy, Sal Iacono, and Dan Warner (ABC)‡; Flight of the Conchords – "Inner City Pressure" by Bret McKenzie, Jemaine Clement, and James Bobin (HBO); Flight of the Conchords – "The Most Beautiful Girl (In the Room)" by Bret McKenzie and Jemaine Clement (HBO); MADtv – "Sad Fitty Cent" by Greg O'Connor, Jordan Peele, and Jim Wise (Fox); Phineas and Ferb – "I Ain't Got Rhythm" by Danny Jacob, Jeff "Swampy" Marsh, Robert F. Hughes, Martin Olson, and Dan Povenmire (Disney Channel)
**Outstanding Original Main Title Theme Music**: **Pirate Master: "Episode 102" – Russ Landau (CBS)**‡; Canterbury's Law – Tree Adams (Fox); Kid Nation: "Episode 101" – Jeff Lippencott and Mark T. Williams (CBS); Phineas and Ferb – Dan Povenmire, Jeff "Swampy" Marsh, Michael Hirano Culross, Carl Hill Williams, and Michael Walker (Disney Channel); Saving Grace: "Pilot" – Eric "Everlast" Schrody (TNT)

=== Picture Editing ===
Picture Editing
**Outstanding Single-Camera Picture Editing for a Drama Series**: **Breaking Bad: "Pilot" – Lynne Willingham (AMC)**‡; Battlestar Galactica: "He That Believeth in Me" – Julius Ramsay (Sci Fi Channel); Boston Legal: "The Mighty Rogues" – Philip Neel (ABC); Heroes: "Powerless" – Scott Boyd (NBC); Lost: "There's No Place Like Home (Parts 2 & 3)" – Henk Van Eeghen, Robert Florio, Mark J. Goldman, and Stephen Semel (ABC); Terminator: The Sarah Connor Chronicles: "Pilot" – Paul Karasick (Fox)	**Outstanding Picture Editing for a Comedy Series (Single or Multi-Camera)**: **Pushing Daisies: "Pie-lette" – Stuart Bass (ABC)**‡; 30 Rock: "Cooter" – Ken Eluto (NBC); Curb Your Enthusiasm: "The Bat Mitzvah" – Steven Rasch (HBO); The Office: "Goodbye, Toby" – Dean Holland and Dave Rogers (NBC); Weeds: "A Pool and His Money" – William Turro (Showtime)
**Outstanding Single-Camera Picture Editing for a Miniseries or a Movie**: **Recount – Alan Baumgarten (HBO)**‡; The Andromeda Strain: "Part 1" – Scott Vickrey (A&E); Extras: The Extra Special Series Finale – Richard Halladey and Graham Barker (HBO); John Adams: "Independence" – Melanie Oliver (HBO); Tin Man: "Part 1" – Allan Lee (Sci Fi Channel)	**Outstanding Picture Editing of a Clip Package for Talk, Performance, Award, or Reality-Competition Programs (Area)**: **American Idol: "Episode 733 (David Cook Goes Home)" – Bill DeRonde and Oren Castro (Fox)**‡; Jimmy Kimmel Live!: "5th Year Anniversary Show (I'm F***ing Matt Damon)" – James Crowe (ABC)‡; 80th Annual Academy Awards: "Oscar Show Tribute Sequence" – Chuck Workman (ABC); Dancing with the Stars: "Episode 610 (Head to Head Package)" – David Timoner (ABC); Jimmy Kimmel Live!: "After the Academy Awards (I'm F***ing Ben Affleck)" – Jason Bielski (ABC)
**Outstanding Picture Editing for a Special (Single or Multi-Camera)**: **Justin Timberlake: FutureSex/LoveShow – Michael D. Schultz, Jim Kelly, and Chad Callner (HBO)**‡; The AFI Life Achievement Award: A Tribute to Al Pacino – Michael Polito, Pi Ware, Narumi Inatsugo, Tim Pernieiaro, and Mark Stepp (USA); Company (Great Performances) – Gary Bradley (PBS); Movies Rock – Mark Stepp, Chester Contaoi, and Bill Morris (CBS); We Love Ella! A Tribute to the First Lady of Song (Great Performances) – Gary Bradley and Laura Young (PBS)	**Outstanding Picture Editing for Nonfiction Programming**: **Autism: The Musical – Kim Roberts (HBO)**‡; AFI's 100 Years...100 Movies – 10th Anniversary Edition – Barry A. O'Brien, Debra Light, and Marlise Malkames (CBS); Deadliest Catch: "No Mercy" – Kelly Coskran and Rob Butler (Discovery Channel); This American Life: "Escape" – Joe Beshenkovsky (Showtime); The War: "FUBAR" – Paul Barnes (PBS); The War: "Pride of Our Nation" – Tricia Reidy (PBS)
**Outstanding Picture Editing for Reality Programming**: **Top Chef: "First Impressions" – Kevin Leffler, Vikash Patel, Marc Clark, Annie Tighe, Steve Lichtenstein, Sue Hoover, and Katherine Griffin (Bravo)**‡; The Amazing Race: "Honestly, They Have Witch Powers or Something" – Steven Escobar, Eric Goldfarb, Julian Gomez, Andy Kozar, Jennifer Nelson, Paul Nielsen, and Jacob Parsons (CBS); Extreme Makeover: Home Edition: "The Hughes Family" – Wes Paster, Matt Deitrich, Tenna Guthrie, Phil Stuben, Jason Cherella, Hilary Scratch, and Steve Mellon (ABC); Project Runway: "En Garde!" – Jamie Pedroza, Bri Dellinger, Steve Lichtenstein, Andy Robertson, Clark Vogeler, LaRonda Morris, and Joe Mastromonaco (Bravo); Survivor: "He's a Ball of Goo!" – Brian Barefoot, Robert D. Mathews, Chad Bertalotto, Andrew Bolhuis, Evan Mediuch, Steve Frederick, and Eric Van Wagenen (CBS)

=== Sound Editing ===
Sound Editing
**Outstanding Sound Editing for a Series**: **Smallville: "Bizarro" – Michael E. Lawshe, Norval "Charlie" Crutcher III, Jessica Dickson, Timothy Cleveland, Marc Meyer, Paul J. Diller, Albert Gomez, Casey Crabtree, Michael Crabtree, and Chris McGeary (The CW)**‡; CSI: Crime Scene Investigation: "Cockroaches" – Mace Matiosian, Ruth Adelman, Jivan Tahmizian, David Van Slyke, Chad Hughes, Joseph Sabella, Zane Bruce, and Troy Hardy (CBS); ER: "The War Comes Home" – Walter Newman, Bob Redpath, Darleen R. Stoker, Bruce Honda, Kenneth Young, Adam Johnston, Casey Crabtree, Michael Crabtree, and Sharyn Tylk-Gersh (NBC); Lost: "The Shape of Things to Come" – Thomas deGorter, Paula Fairfield, Carla Murray, Maciek Malish, Joseph Schultz, Geordy Sincavage, Jay Keiser, Jim Bailey, Cynthia Merril, and Alex Levy (ABC); Supernatural: "Jus in Bello" – Michael E. Lawshe, Norval "Charlie" Crutcher III, Karyn Foster, Marc Meyer, Timothy Cleveland, Paul J. Diller, Albert Gomez, Casey Crabtree, Michael Crabtree, and Dino Moriana (The CW)	**Outstanding Sound Editing for a Miniseries, Movie or a Special**: **John Adams: "Don't Tread on Me" – Stephen Hunter Flick, Vanessa Lapato, Kira Roessler, Curt Schulkey, Randy Kelly, Ken Johnson, Paul Berolzheimer, Dean Beville, Bryan Bowen, Patricio Libenson, Solange S. Schwalbe, David Fein, Hilda Hodges, and Alex Gibson (HBO)**‡; The Andromeda Strain: "Part 2" – Michael Graham, Devon Curry, Anton Holden, Tim Terusa, Dan Tripoli, Mike Dickeson, Bob Costanza, Kevin Fisher, Rick Steele, Bill Bell, Erich Gann, Tim Chilton, Sharon Michaels, and Bunny K. Andrews (A&E); Comanche Moon: "Part 2" – Joseph Melody, Rick Steele, Suzanne Angel, Mike Dickeson, Penny Harold, Adriane Marfiak, Bill Bell, Kevin Fisher, J. Michael Hooser, Tim Chilton, Sharon Michaels, and Chris McGeary (CBS); John Adams: "Unnecessary War" – Jon Johnson, Bryan Bowen, Kira Roessler, Vanessa Lapato, Eileen Horta, Virginia Cook McGowan, Samuel C. Crutcher, Mark Messick, Martin Maryska, Greg Stacy, Patricio Libenson, Solange S. Schwalbe, David Fein, Hilda Hodges, and Nicholas Vitarelli (HBO); Tin Man: "Part 1" – Anke Bakker, Brian Campbell, Kris Fenske, James Fonnyadt, Devan Kraushar, Steve Smith, Matthew Wilson, Ken Cade, Jay Cheetham, Cam Wagner, Shane Shemko, and Rich Walters (Sci Fi Channel)
**Outstanding Sound Editing for Nonfiction Programming (Single or Multi-Camera)**: **The War: "When Things Get Tough" – Erik Ewers, Ryan Gifford, Mariusz Glabinski, Magdaline Volaitis, Ira Spiegel, Marlena Grzaslewicz, and Jacob Ribicoff (PBS)**‡; Alive Day Memories: Home from Iraq – Stuart Stanley and Philippe Desloovere (HBO); The Amazing Race: "Honestly, They Have Witch Powers or Something" – Eric Goldfarb, Andy Kozar, Paul Nielsen, Jacob Parsons, Steven Escobar, Julian Gomez, and Rick Livingstone (CBS); American Masters: "Les Paul: Chasing Sound" – John Paulson (PBS); Autism: The Musical – Keith Rishkofski (HBO); Life After People – Dave Philips, Coby Taitano, Corey Morgan, Stephen Parise, Ryan Young, Nozomu Furuya Hirota, and Jack Crosby (History Channel)

=== Sound Mixing ===
Sound Mixing
**Outstanding Sound Mixing for a Comedy or Drama Series (One-Hour)**: **Lost: "Meet Kevin Johnson" – Robert Anderson, Frank Morrone, and Scott Weber (ABC)**‡; Battlestar Galactica: "Razor" – Rick Bal, Michael Olman, and Kenneth Kobett (Sci Fi Channel); Boston Legal: "Beauty and the Beast" – Clark King, Peter R. Kelsey, and Dave Rawlinson (ABC); Burn Notice: "Loose Ends (Part 1)" – Scott Clements, Sherry Klein, and David Raines (USA); Dexter: "It's Alive!" – Patrick Hanson, Elmo Ponsdomenech, and Joe Earle (Showtime)	**Outstanding Sound Mixing for a Miniseries or a Movie**: **John Adams: "Don't Tread on Me" – Jay Meagher, Marc Fishman, and Tony Lamberti (HBO)**‡; The Andromeda Strain: "Part 1" – Daryl Powell, Terry O'Bright, and Keith Rogers (A&E); Comanche Moon: "Part 2" – Darryl L. Frank, Rick Alexander, and Rich Rogers (CBS); John Adams: "Join or Die" – Jay Meagher, Mike Minkler, and Bob Beemer (HBO); Tin Man: "Part 1" – Eric Lamontagne, Paul Sharpe, Iain Pattison, and Graeme Hughes (Sci Fi Channel)
**Outstanding Sound Mixing for a Comedy or Drama Series (Half-Hour) and Animation (Area)**: **30 Rock: "Episode 210" – Griffin Richardson, Tony Pipitone, and Bill Marino (NBC)**‡; Entourage: "Adios Amigos" – Steve Morantz, Dennis Kirk, and Bill Jackson (HBO); The Office: "Local Ad" – Ben Patrick, John W. Cook II, and Peter J. Nusbaum (NBC); Two and a Half Men: "Is There a Mrs. Waffles?" – Bruce Peters, Kathy Oldham, Charlie McDaniel, and Bob La Masney (CBS); Weeds: "Go" – Susan Moore-Chong, Fred Tator, and Chris Philp (Showtime)	**Outstanding Sound Mixing for a Variety or Music Series or Special (Area)**: **50th Annual Grammy Awards – Thomas Holmes, Klaus Landsberg, John Harris, Eric Schilling, Eric Johnston, Tom Pesa, Mikael Stewart, Ron Reaves, Mike Parker, and Bob La Masney (CBS)**‡; 80th Annual Academy Awards – Edward J. Greene, Tom Vicari, Patrick Baltzell, Robert Douglass, Jamie Santos, Conner Moore, and Paul Sandweiss (ABC); American Idol: "Finale" – Edward J. Greene, Randy Faustino, Andrew Fletcher, Mike Parker, Gary Long, Brian Riordan, Conner Moore, and Christian Schrader (Fox); Late Night with Conan O'Brien: "Episode 2524" – Fred Zeller, Joe Aebig, Glenn Arber, Bruce Leonard, and David Winslow (NBC); Super Bowl XLII Halftime Show Starring Tom Petty & the Heartbreakers – Edward J. Greene, Pablo Munguia, Patrick Baltzell, Robert Douglass, and Ryan Ulyate (Fox)
**Outstanding Sound Mixing for Nonfiction Programming (Single or Multi-Camera)**: **American Masters: "Tony Bennett: The Music Never Ends" – Jason King (PBS)**‡; The Amazing Race: "Honestly, They Have Witch Powers or Something" – Jim Ursulak, Jerry Chabane, Dean Gaveau, and Troy Smith (CBS); Deadliest Catch: "No Mercy" – Bob Bronow (Discovery Channel); The War: "When Things Get Tough" – Dominick Tavella (PBS)

=== Special Visual Effects ===
Special Visual Effects
**Outstanding Special Visual Effects for a Series**: **Battlestar Galactica: "He That Believeth in Me" – Gary Hutzel, Michael Gibson, David Takemura, Doug Drexler, Kyle Toucher, Sean Jackson, Pierre Drolet, Aurore De Blois, and Derek Ledbetter (Sci Fi Channel)**‡; Heroes: "Four Months Ago..." – Eric Grenaudier, Mark Spatny, Gary D'Amico, Mike Enriquez, Michael Cook, Diego Galtieri, Ryan Wieber, Chris Martin, and Daniel Kumiega (NBC); Human Body: Pushing the Limits: "Strength" – Tim Goodchild, Louise Hussey, Mike Tucker, Nick Kool, Hayden Jones, Mark Pascoe, Angela Noble, and Peter Tyler (Discovery Channel); Jericho: "Patriots and Tyrants" – Andrew Orloff, Blythe Dalton, John Stirber, Chris Jones, Michael Cliett, Lane Jolly, Johnathan R. Banta, and Josh Hooker (CBS); Stargate Atlantis: "Adrift" – Mark Savela, Shannon Gurney, Erica Henderson, Jason Gross, Jamie Yukio Kawano, Michael Lowes, Giles Hancock, Jeremy Kehler, and Daniel Osaki (Sci Fi Channel); Terminator: The Sarah Connor Chronicles: "Pilot" – James Lima, Jon Massey, Andrew Orloff, Chris Zapara, Lane Jolly, Steve Graves, Rick Shick, Jeff West, Bradley Mullennix, and Andrew Orloff (Fox)	**Outstanding Special Visual Effects for a Miniseries, Movie or a Special**: **John Adams: "Join or Die" – Erik Henry, Jeff Goldman, Paul Graff, Steve Kullback, Christina Graff, David Van Dyke, Robert Stromberg, Edwardo Mendez, and Ken Gorrell (HBO)**‡; Comanche Moon: "Part 1" – Scott Ramsey, Randy Moore, Chris Martin, Megan Omi, Richard Sachar, Ragui Hanna, Daniel Kumiega, Cedric Tomacruz, and Kristin Johnson (CBS); The Company: "Part 2" – Viktor Muller, Vit Komrzy, Jan Vseticek, Miro Gal, Peter Nemec, Jiri Stamfest, and Jaroslav Matys (TNT); Life After People – Matt Drummond, Max Ivins, Steffen Schlachtenhaufen, Melinka Thompson-Godoy, Andrea D'Amico, Danny Kim, Dave Morton, James Allen May, and Casey Benn (History Channel); Tin Man: "Part 1" – Lee Wilson, Lisa Sepp-Wilson, Sebastien Bergeron, Todd Liddiard, Philippe Thibault, Les Quinn, Mike Goddard, Ken Lee, and Andrew Domachowski (Sci Fi Channel)

=== Stunt Coordination ===
Stunt Coordination
**Outstanding Stunt Coordination**
- **Chuck: "Chuck Versus the Undercover Lover" – Merritt Yohnka (NBC)**‡
  - Criminal Minds: "Tabula Rasa" – Tom Elliott (CBS)
  - CSI: NY: "Playing with Matches" – Norman Howell (CBS)
  - NCIS: "Requiem" – Diamond Farnsworth (CBS)
  - Terminator: The Sarah Connor Chronicles: "Gnothi Seauton" – Joel Kramer (Fox)

=== Technical Direction ===
Technical Direction
**Outstanding Technical Direction, Camerawork, Video for a Series**: **Dancing with the Stars: "Episode 502A" – Charles Ciup, Brian Reason, Hector Ramirez, James Karidas, Dave Levisohn, Larry Heider, Bettina Levesque, Dave Hilmer, Damien Tuffereau, Easter Xua, Mike Malone, and Chuck Reilly (ABC)**‡; Jimmy Kimmel Live!: "After the Academy Awards" – Ervin Hurd, Parker Bartlett, Randy Gomez, Greg Grouwinkel, Garrett Hurt, Ritch Kenney, Kris Wilson, Gary Taillon, and Christopher Gray (ABC); Late Night with Conan O'Brien: "Episode 2585" – Gregory Aull, Richard S. Carter, Patrick Casey, Kurt Decker, Eugene Huelsman, Chris Matott, James Palczewski, Vincent Demaio, James Mott, Edward Wallace, James Corgan, and Carl M. Henry III (NBC); Late Show with David Letterman: "Episode 2827" – Timothy W. Kennedy, Karin-Lucie Grzella, David Dorsett, Jack Young, Al Cialino, John Curtin, Fred Shimizu, Daniel L. Campbell, John Hannel, Dan Flaherty, George Rothweiler, Steven G. Kaufman, and William J. White (CBS)	**Outstanding Technical Direction, Camerawork, Video for a Miniseries, Movie or a Special**: **50th Annual Grammy Awards – John B. Field, Eric Becker, Mike Breece, David Eastwood, Freddy Frederick, Hank Geving, Dean Hall, Larry Heider, Dave Hilmer, Ed Horton, Marc Hunter, Charlie Huntley, Dave Levisohn, Steve Martyniuk, Rob Palmer, Bill Philbin, Hector Ramirez, Brian Reason, Ted Ashton, Keith Winikoff, and Guy Jones (CBS)**‡; 80th Annual Academy Awards – John B. Field, Kenneth Shapiro, Allan Wells, Ted Ashton, Robert Balton, Danny Bonilla, John Burdick, David Eastwood, Marc Hunter, Charlie Huntley, Dave Levisohn, Lyn Noland, Rob Palmer, Bill Philbin, David Plakos, Hector Ramirez, Brian Reason, Mark Whitman, Kris Wilson, Easter Xua, Keith Dicker, Dean Hall, Steve Martyniuk, Mark Sanford, Keith Winikoff, and Chuck Reilly (ABC); American Idol: "Idol Gives Back" – Shiran Stotland, Eric Becker, David Eastwood, Marc Hunter, Bobby Highton, Brian Reason, Easter Xua, Danny Bonilla, George Prince, Ed Horton, John Repczynski, Suzanne Ebner, Diane Beiderbeck, William Chaikowski, Alex Hernandez, and Mark Sanford (Fox); Hansel and Gretel (Great Performances at the Met) – Jon Pretnar, Miguel Armstrong, Bill Finley, Manny Gutierrez, Charlie Huntley, John "Kosmo" Kosmaczewski, Alain Onesto, Tim Quigley, Mark Renaudin, David Smith, Larry Solomon, Jim Tufaro, Ron Washburn, Mark Whitman, Jeff Muhlstock, Claus Stuhlweissenburg, Billy Steinberg, Matty Randazzo, and Paul Ranieri (PBS); Justin Timberlake: FutureSex/LoveShow – Keith Winikoff, Ted Ashton, Rob Balton, John Burdick, Robert Delrusso, Manny Gutierrez, Ray Hoover, Gene Kelly, Tore Livia, Steve Martyniuk, John Meiklejohn, Jay Millard, Lyn Noland, Kenneth Patterson, Tim Quigley, Brian Reason, Mark Renaudin, Carlos Rios, Jim Scurti, Eli Clarke, Freddy Frederick, Jimmy Goldsmith, Helene Haviland, Jim Yockey, Rich York, John "Kosmo" Kosmaczewski, Matty Randazzo, Paul Ranieri, and Roy Otake (HBO)

=== Writing ===
Writing
**Outstanding Writing for Nonfiction Programming**
- **The War: "Pride of Our Nation" – Geoffrey C. Ward (PBS)**‡
  - Intervention: "Caylee" – Jeff Grogan (A&E)
  - Life After People – David de Vries (History Channel)
  - This American Life: "Escape" – Ira Glass (Showtime)
  - Walt Whitman (American Experience) – Mark Zwonitzer (PBS)

=== Governors Award ===
The Governors Award was presented to the National Geographic Channel's "Preserve Our Planet" campaign, a "long-term, multi-platform effort to help Americans understand the issues of environmental conservation and global survival".

=== Nominations and wins by program ===
For the purposes of the lists below, any wins in juried categories are assumed to have a prior nomination.

Shows with multiple Creative Arts nominations
Nominations	Show	Network
15	John Adams	HBO
11	30 Rock	NBC
10	Mad Men	AMC
8	Pushing Daisies	ABC
8	Tin Man	Sci Fi Channel
7	80th Annual Academy Awards	ABC
7	The War	PBS
6	The Andromeda Strain	A&E
6	Dancing with the Stars	ABC
5	50th Annual Grammy Awards	CBS
5	The Amazing Race	CBS
5	Autism: The Musical	HBO
5	Bernard and Doris	HBO
5	Comanche Moon	CBS
5	The Company	TNT
5	Lost	ABC
5	This American Life	Showtime
4	Battlestar Galactica	Sci Fi Channel
4	Cranford (Masterpiece)	PBS
4	Deadliest Catch	Discovery Channel
4	Desperate Housewives	ABC
4	Jimmy Kimmel Live!	ABC
4	So You Think You Can Dance	Fox
4	Ugly Betty	ABC
3	American Idol	CBS
3	American Masters	PBS
3	Curb Your Enthusiasm	HBO
3	Dexter	Showtime
3	Grey's Anatomy	ABC
3	Heroes	NBC
3	Late Night with Conan O'Brien	NBC
3	Life After People	History Channel
3	MADtv	Fox
3	Project Runway	Bravo
3	Recount	HBO
3	Terminator: The Sarah Connor Chronicles	Fox
3	Tracey Ullman's State of the Union	Showtime
3	Two and a Half Men	CBS
2	AFI's 100 Years...100 Movies – 10th Anniversary Edition	CBS
2	Alive Day Memories	HBO
2	Boston Legal	ABC
2	Breaking Bad	AMC
2	Californication	Showtime
2	Chuck	NBC
2	CSI: Crime Scene Investigation	CBS
2	Creature Comforts America	CBS
2	ER	NBC
2	Extreme Makeover: Home Edition	ABC
2	Flight of the Conchords	HBO
2	High School Musical 2	Disney Channel
2	In Treatment	HBO
2	Intervention	A&E
2	Justin Timberlake: FutureSex/LoveShow	HBO
2	Late Show with David Letterman	CBS
2	Law & Order: Special Victims Unit	NBC
2	Movies Rock	CBS
2	Nip/Tuck	FX
2	The Office	NBC
2	Phineas and Ferb	Disney Channel
2	Rescue Me	FX
2	Sense & Sensibility (Masterpiece)	PBS
2	The Simpsons	Fox
2	Survivor	CBS
2	Top Chef	Bravo
2	The Tudors	Showtime
2	Walt Whitman (American Experience)	PBS
2	Weeds	Showtime

Shows with multiple Creative Arts wins
Wins	Show	Network
8	John Adams	HBO
4	Mad Men	AMC
3	30 Rock	NBC
3	50th Annual Grammy Awards	CBS
3	The War	PBS
2	American Masters	PBS
2	Autism: The Musical	HBO
2	Dancing with the Stars	ABC
2	Jimmy Kimmel Live!	ABC
2	Pushing Daisies	ABC
2	This American Life	Showtime

=== Nominations and wins by network ===
Networks with multiple Creative Arts nominations
Nominations	Network
50	ABC
47	HBO
40	CBS
30	NBC
29	PBS
23	Fox
17	Showtime
13	Sci Fi Channel
12	AMC
8	A&E
8	Bravo
7	TNT
6	Discovery Channel
6	Disney Channel
5	FX
5	History Channel
4	Cartoon Network
3	USA
2	The CW
2	NBC.com
2	Nickelodeon

Networks with multiple Creative Arts wins
Wins	Network
16	HBO
9	ABC
9	PBS
8	CBS
6	NBC
5	AMC
5	Showtime
3	Fox
2	Bravo
2	Cartoon Network
2	Sci Fi Channel

== Presenters ==
The following individuals presented awards at the ceremony:

- Jennifer Beals
- Valerie Bertinelli
- Bryan Cranston
- Jon Cryer
- Alan Cumming
- Cat Deeley
- Lisa Edelstein
- Jenna Fischer
- Seth Green
- Anna Gunn
- Tom Hanks
- Joe Mantegna
- Jack McBrayer
- Cesar Millan
- Masi Oka
- Lee Pace
- James Pickens, Jr.
- Oliver Platt
- Chloë Sevigny
- Sarah Silverman
- Evan Spiridellis
- Gregg Spiridellis
