= Pandemonium: the Lost and Found Orchestra =

Pandemonium: the Lost and Found Orchestra is a music based physical theatre piece created by the founders of the percussive theatre show Stomp, Luke Cresswell and Steve McNicholas.

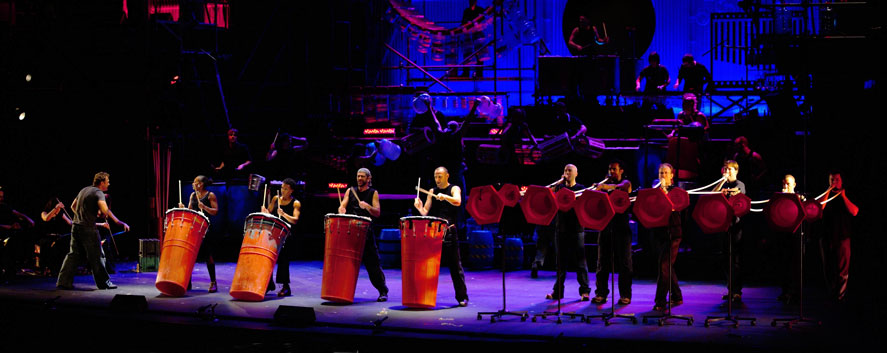

Its origins lie in the theatrical conceits of Stomp and the film/TV soundtrack work of Cresswell/McNicholas. The basic premise was to create an entire orchestra, replacing each section with invented instruments and found objects, bringing the elements of physical theatre and silent comedy from Stomp to an eclectic orchestral concert.

It was initially commissioned for the 2006 Brighton Festival, which was celebrating its 40th anniversary, re-appeared at the Sydney Festival in the Sydney Opera House the following year. After playing the Royal Festival Hall it had a short run at the Carré Theatre in Amsterdam in early 2009. Reworked and renamed for 2010 performances in the USA, what was formerly known as "The Lost and Found Orchestra" or "LFO" became the show, "Pandemonium", as performed by the LFO.
