= Harriet Leve =

American theatrical producer

Harriet Newman Leve is an American theater and movie producer. She is best known for her work with Broadway shows, including Beautiful: The Carole King Musical (2014), Hedwig and the Angry Inch (2014), An American in Paris (2019), and Life of Pi (2023). She was also the executive producer of the films A Call to Spy (2019) and Radium Girls (2018). Plays that she co-produced on Broadway have received Drama Desk Awards, Drama League Awards, Olivier Awards, Outer Critics Circle Awards, and four Tony Awards.

== Early life ==
Leve is a graduate of the Indiana University Bloomington.

== Career ==
Leve began producing plays in Los Angeles in from 1984 to 1995. She began working off-broadway in New York in 1994, with a production of the original play, Edith Stein. Her Broadway premier was Twilight: Los Angeles, 1992 in April 1994. She co-produced the national tour and co-produced the original New York production of STOMP, which ran for 29 years, from February 27, 1994 to January 8, 2023.

Leve's other Broadway productions include Of Mice and Men starring James Franco and Chris O'Dowd, Ann based on the life of former Texas Governor, Ann Richards, written and performed by Holland Taylor, the George Gershwin musical Nice Work If You Can Get It starring Matthew Broderick and Kelli O'Hara, the hit comedy One Man, Two Guvnors starring James Corden, the Tony Award-winning production of War Horse at Lincoln Center, the Tony Award-winning productions of Alfred Hitchcock's The 39 Steps, and the Tony Award-winning production of Alan Ayckbourn's The Norman Conquests.

With Raise the Roof, Leve co-produced The Mountaintop starring Samuel L. Jackson, Burn the Floor on Broadway and the National Tour, Tracy Letts's Superior Donuts at the Music Box Theater on Broadway, Stephen Sondheim's A Little Night Music starring Catherine Zeta-Jones and Angela Lansbury, and the three-time Tony Award-winning production of La Cage Aux Folles.

Other productions include the Tony-nominated Broadway production of Martin McDonagh's The Lieutenant of Inishmore, the Broadway and national tour productions of Eve Ensler's The Good Body, August Wilson's Ma Rainey's Black Bottom; the Tony-nominated production of Arthur Miller's The Crucible, Hedda Gabler, the Tony-nominated production of The Diary of Anne Frank, Twilight: Los Angeles, 1992, and the Olivier Award-winning production of Kat and the Kings.

She co-produced the world premiere musical Beautiful: The Carole King Musical which opened on January 12, 2014. She co-produced the Broadway premiere of Hedwig and the Angry Inch at the Belasco Theatre with Raise the Roof; Hedwig opened on April 22, 2014. Leve co-produced the world premiere of An American in Paris, based on the Oscar-winning film of the same name. An American in Paris debuted at the Théâtre du Châtelet in Paris on December 10, 2014, before transferring to Broadway. She co-produced the musical Redwood, which ran on Broadway from February 13, 2025 to May 18, 2025 and the play Life of Pi, which ran on Broadway from March 30, 2023 to July 23, 2023 and was on US tour from 2024 to 2025. She also co-produced the Broadway musical Ain’t Too Proud: The Life and Times of the Temptations which opened on Broadway on March 21, 2019, and closed in London's West End on September 17, 2023.

Harriet is now co-producing the upcoming revival of Damn Yankees on Broadway, which begins previews March 24th and opens April 20th, 2027 at the Marquis Theater.

She is a member of The Broadway League and was on the board of directors of New York Stage and Film for four years.

== Awards ==
- 1994 Drama Desk Award Unique Theater Experience – Harriet Newman Leve for Stomp
- 2002 Drama League Award Distinguished Production of a Revival – The Crucible
- 2008 Drama Desk Award Unique Theatrical Experience – The 39 Steps
- 2009 Tony Award for Best Revival of a Play – The Norman Conquests
- 2009 Drama Desk Award for Outstanding Revival of a Play – The Norman Conquests
- 2009 Outer Critics Circle Award for Outstanding Revival of a Play – The Norman Conquests
- 2010 Tony Award for Best Revival of a Musical – La Cage Aux Folles
- 2011 Outer Critics Circle Award for Outstanding New Broadway Play – War Horse
- 2011 Drama Desk Award for Outstanding Play and Special Award – War Horse
- 2012 Outer Critics Circle Award for Outstanding New Broadway Play – One Man, Two Guvnors
- 2014 Tony Award for Best Revival of a Musical – Hedwig and the Angry Inch
- 2014 Outer Critics Circle Award for Outstanding Revival of a Musical – Hedwig and the Angry Inch
- 2014 Drama League Award for Distinguished Revival of a Musical – Hedwig and the Angry Inch
- 2015 Outer Critics Circle Award for Outstanding New Broadway Musical – An American in Paris
- 2022 Laurence Olivier Awards Best New Play – Life of Pi

== Filmography ==
- Pulse: a STOMP Odyssey (2002), producer
- A Call to Spy (2019), executive producter
- Radium Girls (2018), executive producer
- A Call to Spy (2019), executive producer

== Selected productions ==
=== Broadway ===
- Twilight: Los Angeles, 1992 (Original Play, Solo), April 17, 1994 – June 19, 1994
- The Diary of Anne Frank (Revival Play), December 4, 1997 – June 14, 1998
- Kat and the Kings (Original Musical), August 19, 1999 – January 2, 2000
- Hedda Gabler (Revival Play), October 4, 2001 – January 13, 2002
- The Crucible (Revival Play), March 7, 2002 – June 9, 2002
- Ma Rainey's Black Bottom (Revival Play), February 6, 2003 – April 6, 2003
- The Good Body (Original Play), November 15, 2004 – December 19, 2004
- The Lieutenant of Inishmore (Original Play), May 3, 2006 – September 3, 2006
- Coram Boy (Original, Play with music), May 2, 2007 – May 27, 2007
- The 39 Steps (Original Play), January 15, 2008 – January 10, 2010
- The Norman Conquests: Round and Round the Garden (Revival Play) April 23, 2009 – July 26, 2009
- The Norman Conquests: Table Manners (Revival Play), April 24, 2009 – July 26, 2009
- The Norman Conquests: Living Together (Revival Play), April 25, 2009 – July 26, 2009
- Burn the Floor (Dance), August 2, 2009 – January 10, 2010
- Superior Donuts (Original Play), October 1, 2009 – January 3, 2010
- A Little Night Music (Revival Musical), December 13, 2009 – January 9, 2011
- La Cage Aux Folles (Revival Musical), April 18, 2010 – May 1, 2011
- War Horse (Original Play), April 14, 2011 – January 6, 2013
- The Mountaintop (Original Play), October 13, 2011 – January 22, 2012
- One Man, Two Guvnors (Original Play), April 18, 2012 – September 2, 2012
- Nice Work If You Can Get It (Original Musical), April 24, 2012 – June 15, 2013
- Dead Accounts (Original Play), November 29, 2012 – January 6, 2013
- Ann (Original, Play), March 7, 2013 – June 30, 2013
- Beautiful: The Carole King Musical (Original Musical), January 12, 2014 – October 27, 2019
- Of Mice and Men (Revival Play), April 16, 2014 – July 27, 2014
- Hedwig and the Angry Inch (Original Musical), April 22, 2014– September 13, 2015
- An American in Paris (Original Musical), April 12, 2015 – October 9, 2016
- Anastasia (Original Musical), April 24, 2017 – March 31, 2019
- Ain't Too Proud: The Life and Times of the Temptations (Original Musical), March 21, 2019 – January 16, 2022
- Life of Pi (Play), March 30, 2023 – July 23, 2023
- Redwood (Original Musical), February 13, 2025 - May 18, 2025

=== Off-Broadway ===
- Edith Stein (Original Play), January 8, 1994 – January 30, 1994
- The 39 Steps (Original Play), March 25, 2010 – January 16, 2011
- Stomp (Original Instrumental), February 27, 1994 – January 8, 2023
- Bunny Bunny (Original Play), March 23, 1997 – May 25, 1997
- Communicating Doors (Original Play, Drama), August 20, 1998 – January 3, 1999
- Necessary Targets (Original Play), February 28, 2002 – April 21, 2002
- Shockheaded Peter (Original, Musical, Comedy), February 22, 2005 – May 29, 2005
- Family Secrets (Original Play), March 8, 2006 – April 9, 2006
- The Beebo Brinker Chronicles (Original Play), February 19, 2008 – April 29, 2008

=== National Tours ===
- The 39 Steps (Original Play), August 2009–June 2010
- Burn the Floor (Dance), September 2010–June 2011
- La Cage Aux Folles (Revival Musical), October 2011–November 2012
- War Horse (Original Play), June 2012– August 2014
- Beautiful: The Carole King Musical (Original Musical), September 2019–May 2023
- Ain't Too Proud: The Life and Times of the Temptations (Original Musical), December 2021–2024

=== Los Angeles ===
- Isn't It Romantic (Original Play), October 18, 1984 – September 1, 1985
- The Normal Heart (Original Play), April 21, 1985 – July 7, 1985
- Curse of the Starving Class (Revival Play), July 20, 1985 – February 16, 1986
- Excess Baggage (Original Play), 1988
- Telegrams from Heaven (Original Play), 1992
- Why We Have a Body (Original Play), 1995

== Publications ==
- "You Never Forget Your First Time" in The Commercial Theater Institute: Guide to Producing Plays and Musicals. Frederic B. Vogel and Ben Hodges, editors. New York: Applause Theatre & Cinema Books, 2006. ISBN 1557836523
