= Pulse: A Stomp Odyssey =

- Directed by: Luke Cresswell; Steve McNicholas
- Produced by: Don Kempf; Steve Kempf; Harriet Leve; James D. Stern
- Cinematography: Christophe Lanzenberg; James Neihouse
- Edited by: Luke Cresswell; Steve McNicholas
- Production companies: Giant Screen Films; Walden Media; Endgame Entertainment; Leve Productions; Yes/No Productions
- Distributed by: Giant Screen Films; La Géode
- Release date: October 17, 2002
- Running time: 40 minutes
- Country: United States
- Language: English
- Box office: $10,086,514

Pulse: A Stomp Odyssey is a 2002 American short documentary film inspired by the Theatrical Production Stomp. The film begins with the members of "Stomp" pounding out a beat from the windows and fire escapes from several floors of a rundown NYC apartment building (the multiples stories are seen to excellent effect on the giant vertical screen) and proceeds with brief segments, cut together with often clever segues, depicting the various international troupes performing in their own parts of the world. (Hollywood Reporter) Some featured performances include Brazil's Timbalada, South Africa's Bayeza Cultural Dancers and Les Percussions de Guinée.

Stomp was directed by Luke Cresswell and Steve McNicholas. It was the first film to be produced and distributed by Walden Media. It won the 2004 Giant Screen Theater Association Film Achievement Award for Best Film and for Best Sound in 2003. The Motion Picture Sound Editors also nominated it for best Sound Editing in Special Venue Award in 2003.
