= Raise the Roof =

Raise the Roof may refer to:

== Film ==
- Raise the Roof (film), a 1930 film directed by Walter Summers
- Raise the Roof, a 2015 documentary film about the construction of a replica of the Gwoździec Synagogue

== Music ==
- Raise the Roof (album), a 2021 collaboration album by Robert Plant and Alison Krauss
- Raise the Roof (composition), a timpani concerto by Michael Daugherty
- "Raise the Roof" (Luke song), 1998
- "Raise the Roof", a song by Tracey Thorn
- "Raise the Roof", a 2012 song by Morten Hampenberg & Alexander Brown
- "Raise the Roof", a song from the 2000 musical The Wild Party
- "Raise the Roof", a song by NCT U from their album NCT 2020 Resonance Pt. 2

== Other uses ==
- Raise the Roof (game show), a British television game show
- Raise the Roof (producer), a Broadway theatre production group
- Raise the Roof, a book by Pat Summitt

== See also ==
- Raising the Roof, a 1972 British comedy film
- Raising the Roofs, a 2006 American reality television show
