= The Yes/No People =

British band

Yes/No People were a British band which recorded on London Records, and which featured Luke Cresswell and Steve McNicholas, and now are best known for their dance theatre performance pieces called Stomp.

== Pookiesnackenburger ==
Yes/No People grew out of another act named Pookiesnackenburger, that was formed in Brighton in the early 1980s, and which was named after a character on a compilation album of 1960s American radio recordings. The band released a number of albums that were a mixture of rhythm and blues and comedy, contributed material to the Channel 4 show Alter Image, and had an eponymous 1985 Channel 4 television series. Other band members included Sue Bradley, also of the Reward System and the New Objekts.

Pookiesnackenburger were also responsible for the Heineken Pilsener "Bins" commercial, which would be further developed into climactic dustbin dance in the Stomp shows.

Pookiesnackenburger used to open for the band Madness in the 1980s at the Dominion Theatre in London.

== Early career of Yes/No People ==
In 1986 Yes/No People signed to London Records, and started work on their debut album. A Yes/No People performance can be seen in the Bette Midler HBO special Mondo Beyondo.

On 9 September 1986 the band appeared at the Limelight, London.

On 28 March 1987 the band appeared in an episode of Saturday Live aired on Channel 4, in which they performed the track 'Some Things Are True'.

A track from the band appeared on the London Records sampler Giant in September 1987, along with tracks by other bands such as Hothouse Flowers and Voice of the Beehive. Later in 1987, the band's debut single "Mr. Johnson" was released; it failed to reach the Top 75 UK Singles Chart, however it did register on "The Next 25" feature, spending one week on that list at #99. Apart from the theme tune to Channel 4's Wired, no further music was heard from the band in the 1980s.

At this point, with the traditional band set-up failing to make much headway in the charts, Yes/No People moved into other areas and decided to go back to the musical theatre idea of Pookiesnackenburger.

== Stomp ==
In 1991 the ITV children's show presented by Andrea Arnold, called A Beetle Called Derek appeared and included a number of percussive video shorts by Yes/No People. It was from these parts that "Stomp" was developed as a full-length theatre show. Stomp had a large and varying line-up centred on Cresswell and McNicholas, appearing first at the Edinburgh Fringe, Royal Court Theatre, and for several years on international tour.

In 1994 they recorded the theme tune for the children's television programme Blue Peter, which was used from September 1994 until August 1999.
