= Stomp Out Loud =

1997 musical film

Stomp Out Loud is a 1997 musical film produced by HBO that featured the Brighton, UK, and Manhattan-based dance troupe known as Stomp. The film is 44 minutes long and provides footage from the Broadway performances as well as scenes shot solely for the film. The film transforms ordinary objects and moments to make music in an unexpected way. There is hardly any dialogue in the film, but the movement of the actors display the unspoken words. The location of the scenes vary from the inside of a truck, under a bridge, the streets on a rainy day, the kitchen of a restaurant, and in the air with the actors suspended. The objects used to make the music vary from basketballs, broomsticks, socks, and trash cans.

It was nominated for the Primetime Emmy Award for Outstanding Sound Mixing for a Variety Series or Special, and won the Primetime Emmy Award for Outstanding Picture Editing for Variety Programming.

It was directed by Luke Cresswell and Steve McNicholas. The cast included Steven Dean Davis, Keith Middleton, Dashiell Eaves, Anthony Sparks, Raquel Horsford, Michael Bove and Anthony Johnson.
