= Riot (1997 film) =

1997 TV movie directed by Galen Yuen

- Written by: Galen Yuen; Joseph B. Vasquez; Richard Di Lello; David C. Johnson
- Directed by: Galen Yuen; Alex Munoz; Richard Di Lello; David C. Johnson
- Starring: Dante Basco; Kieu Chinh; Mako; Alexis Cruz; Yelba Osorio; John Ortiz; Douglas Spain; Luke Perry; Peter Dobson; Mario van Peebles; Melvin van Peebles; Cicely Tyson
- Music by: Luke Cresswell; Steve McNicholas
- Country of origin: United States
- Original languages: English, Spanish, Chinese

Production
- Producer: Shelly Glasser
- Cinematography: Paul Elliott
- Editor: Norman Buckley
- Running time: 105 minutes

Original release
- Release: April 27, 1997

Riot is a 1997 American television film starring Luke Perry and Mario Van Peebles. It was written and directed by four writers and directors of four different racial groups prominent in Los Angeles. The title "Riot" refers to the Los Angeles riots of 1992 that were sparked by the beating of Rodney King, and the subsequent acquittal of the four police officers who beat him.

== Plot ==
The film dissects the aftermath of the Rodney King verdict and the ensuing riots through four narratives. A Chinese liquor store owner tries to come to an understanding with his assimilating teenage son who sees his father's Old World ways and non-aggressive Buddhism as signs of weakness. A Hispanic teenager tries to live a straight life and do well in school so he will not make the same mistakes his older brother had made, and be able to provide as best he can for his current and future family. A white LAPD officer struggles with obligations from his new girlfriend and not-quite-ex-wife, while confronting a surprisingly gung ho attitude from his fellow officers. An African American middle class man who has recently moved his new family out of "the ghetto", visits the store his father used to own in the old neighborhood and seeks to give some good news to his mother who has vivid memories from living through the Watts riots less than thirty years prior. These four stories are nominally separate vignettes, but interact with each other throughout the film.

== Cast ==
Actor	Role
Dante Basco	Jeffrey Lee (segment "Gold Mountain")
Mako	Mr. Lee (segment "Gold Mountain")
Kieu Chinh	Mrs. Lee (segment "Gold Mountain")
Derek Basco	Lyle (segment "Gold Mountain")
Phil Wong	Phil (segment "Gold Mountain")
Douglas Spain	Manuel (segment "Caught in the Fever")
Yelba Osorio	Iris (segment "Caught in the Fever")
John Ortiz	Cisco (segment "Caught in the Fever")
Alexis Cruz	Carlos (segment "Caught in the Fever")
Luke Perry	Boomer (segment "Empty")
Peter Dobson	Chaz (segment "Empty")
Lucy Liu	Boomer's girlfriend (segment "Empty")
Mario Van Peebles	Turner (segment "Homecoming Day")
Cicely Tyson	Maggie (segment "Homecoming Day")
Melvin Van Peebles	Vernon (segment "Homecoming Day")
