= Raise the Roof (producer) =

Raise the Roof is a Broadway producing entity. It is composed of the producers Harriet Leve, Jennifer Isaacson, and the members of WalkRunFly Productions: Brandon Victor Dixon and Warren Adams.

The group was founded by Jean Doumanian, Elaine Krauss, Harriet Leve, and Jennifer Isaacson. Their first venture together was Burn the Floor as Raise the Roof 1. Next, Krauss, Leve, and Manocherian came together as Raise the Roof 2 to produce the recent Broadway production of Superior Donuts by Tracy Letts, the Pulitzer Prize winning playwright of August: Osage County. Doumanian was a lead producer on that production. In 2010, the group, as Raise the Roof 3, produced the Tony nominee for Best Revival, A Little Night Music, starring Catherine Zeta Jones (who won a Tony for this performance) and Angela Lansbury (who was nominated for a Tony for this performance). On July 13, 2010, Broadway legends Bernadette Peters and Elaine Stritch joined the cast and assumed those roles. They were also represented, as Raise the Roof 4, by the Tony Award winning Best Revival of La Cage Aux Folles, starring Kelsey Grammer (who was nominated for a Tony for this performance) and Douglas Hodge (who won a Tony for this performance).

== Productions ==
La Cage Aux Folles [Revival, Musical]

Cast featuring: Kelsey Grammer, Douglas Hodge, A.J. Shively
April 6, 2010 - May 01, 2011

A Little Night Music [Revival, Musical]

Cast featuring: Catherine Zeta-Jones (through June 20th), Angela Lansbury (through June 20th), Bernadette Peters (beginning July 13th), Elaine Stritch (beginning July 13th), Alexander Hanson, Erin Davie, Hunter Ryan Herdlicka, Leigh Ann Larkin, Aaron Lazar, Ramona Mallory
November 24, 2009–Present

Superior Donuts [Original, Play]

Cast featuring: Michael McKean, Jon Michael Hill, Yasen Peyankov, James Vincent Meredith, Kate Buddeke, Robert Maffia, Jane Alderman, Cliff Chamberlain, Michael Garvey
September 16, 2009 - January 3, 2010

Burn the Floor [Dance]

Created by Harley Medcalf
Featuring: Maksim Chmerkovskiy, Karina Smirnoff, Henry Bayalikov, Sharna Burgess, Kevin Clifton, Sasha Farber, Jeremy Garner, Anya Garnis, Gordana Grandosek, Patrick Helm, Sarah Hives, Melanie Hooper, Peta Murgatroyd, Giselle Peacock, Sarah Soriano, Damon Sugden, Rebecca Sugden, Damian Whitewood, Trent Widdon, and Robin Windsor
July 25, 2009 – January 10, 2010

== Awards and nominations ==
=== La Cage Aux Folles ===
TONY AWARDS

2010 Tony Award Best Revival of a Musical [WINNER]

2010 Tony Award Best Leading Actor in a Musical

Kelsey Grammer [nominee]
Douglas Hodge [WINNER]

2010 Tony Award Best Featured Actor in a Musical

Robin De Jesus [nominee]

2010 Tony Award Best Direction of a Musical

Terry Johnson [WINNER]

2010 Tony Award Best Choreography

Lynne Page [nominee]

2010 Tony Award Best Orchestrations

Jason Carr [nominee]

2010 Tony Award Best Scenic Design of a Musical

Tim Shortall [nominee]

2010 Tony Award Best Costume Design of a Musical

Matthew Wright [nominee]

2010 Tony Award Best Lighting Design of a Musical

Nick Richings [nominee]

2010 Tony Award Best Sound Design of a Musical

Jonathan Deans [nominee]

DRAMA DESK AWARDS

2010 Drama Desk Award Outstanding Revival of a Musical [WINNER]

2010 Drama Desk Award Outstanding Actor in a Musical

Douglas Hodge [WINNER]

2010 Drama Desk Award Outstanding Featured Actor in a Musical

Robin De Jesus [nominee]

2010 Drama Desk Award Outstanding Director of a Musical

Terry Johnson [nominee]

2010 Drama Desk Award Outstanding Choreography in a Musical

Lynne Page [nominee]

2010 Drama Desk Award Outstanding Costume Design

Matthew Wright [nominee]

2010 Drama Desk Award Outstanding Sound Design in a Musical

Jonathan Deans [nominee]

=== A Little Night Music ===
TONY AWARDS

2010 Tony Award Best Revival of a Musical [nominee]

2010 Tony Award Best Leading Actress in a Musical

Catherine Zeta-Jones [WINNER]

2010 Tony Award Best Featured Actress in a Musical

Angela Lansbury [nominee]

2010 Tony Award Best Sound Design of a Musical

Dan Moses Schreier and Gareth Owen [nominee]

DRAMA DESK AWARDS

2010 Drama Desk Award Outstanding Revival of a Musical [nominee]

2010 Drama Desk Award Outstanding Actress in a Musical

Catherine Zeta-Jones [WINNER]

2010 Drama Desk Award Outstanding Featured Actress in a Musical

Angela Lansbury [nominee]

=== Superior Donuts ===
TONY AWARDS

2010 Tony Award Best Featured Actor in a Play

Jon Michael Hill [nominee]
