= Alive Day Memories =

- Also known as: Alive Day Memories: Home from Iraq
- Directed by: Jon Alpert; Ellen Goosenberg Kent
- Starring: James Gandolfini; Dawn Halfaker; Dexter Pitts; John P. W. Jones; Jacob Schick
- Theme music composer: Wendy Blackstone; Peter Fish
- Country of origin: United States
- Original language: English

Production
- Producer: Jon Alpert
- Cinematography: Jon Alpert; Matthew O'Neill
- Editor: Paula Heredia
- Running time: 57 minutes
- Production company: Attaboy Films

Original release
- Release: September 9, 2007

Alive Day Memories: Home from Iraq is a 2007 documentary television film featuring interviews with Iraq War amputees.

== Summary ==
Ten veterans tell producer James Gandolfini of how they received their near-fatal wounds while serving in the Iraq War, and the emotional effect that it has had on them.

Among the veterans featured in the documentary are Dawn Halfaker, a former U.S. Army officer who lost her right arm in Iraq; Dexter Pitts, who discusses his experiences with post-traumatic stress disorder; and Jay Wilkerson, who sustained a traumatic brain injury in a roadside bombing.

An ‘Alive Day’ is the anniversary of a day when a veteran or service member nearly lost their life in combat, survived a severe injury, recovered from a serious illness, or experienced any near-death event that had a major impact on their life. The term was coined by Jim Mayer, a veteran lobbyist who lost his legs to a landmine explosion while serving in the Vietnam War and has celebrated surviving his wounds every year since the incident.

== Accolades ==
- Television Academy Honors
