= Stomp (theatrical show) =

British percussion group

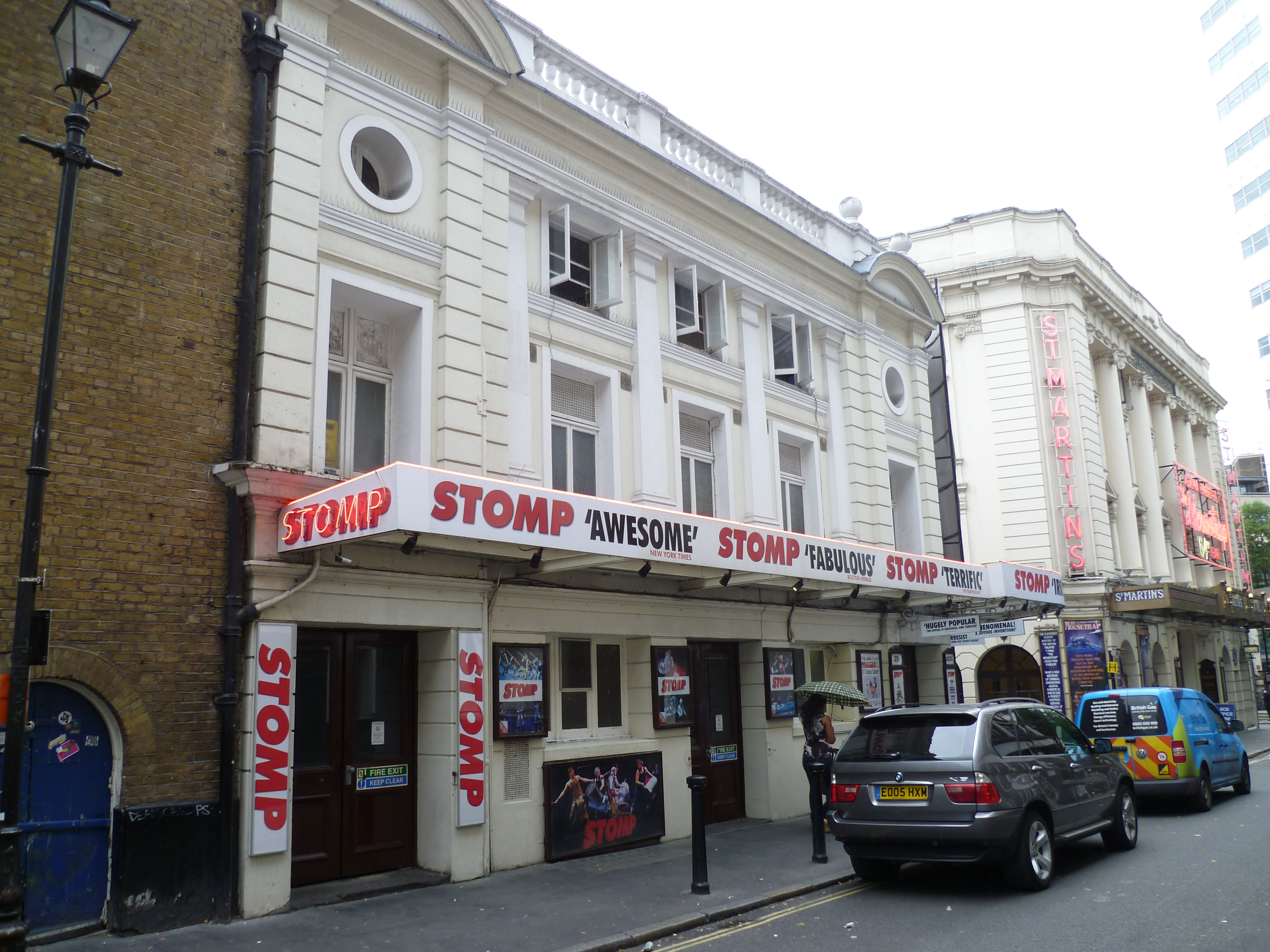
- Stomp at the Ambassadors Theatre, West Street, London, July 2016.
- Genre: Physical theatre
- Show type: Off-Broadway, West End, touring
- Date of premiere: 1991
- Location: Ambassadors Theatre, London; Touring

Creative team
- Co-creator: Steve McNicholas
- Co-creator: Luke Cresswell
- Official website

Stomp (stylised as STOMP) is a percussion group, originating in Brighton, England, that uses the body and ordinary objects to create a physical theatre performance using rhythms, acrobatics, and pantomime.

== History and performances ==
=== 1990–98 ===
Stomp was created by Steve McNicholas and Luke Cresswell in 1991. The performers use a variety of everyday objects as percussion instruments in their shows.

Cresswell and McNicholas first worked together in 1981 as members of the street band Pookiesnackenburger and the theatre group Cliff Hanger. Together, these groups presented a series of street comedy musicals at the Edinburgh Festival throughout the early 1980s. After two albums, a TV series and extensive touring in Europe, Pookiesnackenburger also produced the "Bins" commercial for Heineken lager. The piece was originally written and choreographed as part of the band's stage show.

In 1986, Cresswell formed the Urban Warriors, a "junkpercussion duo" with Benjamin Frederick Tin, a Liverpool drummer also based in Brighton. Cresswell later said, "Two of us would do street work, beating the hell out of each other with sticks and armour made out of bits of metal." The Urban Warriors appeared on the 1986 children's television show No.73 and the Tube with Jools Holland. Tin also appeared in the Heineken advert, playing a drum solo on dustbin lids.

Between 1987 and 1990, Cresswell directed and staged four large-scale outdoor events, including "Beat the Clyde", which involved floating a drum orchestra on a pontoon in the centre of Glasgow. The largest of these events, the "Heineken Hove Lagoon Show", involved a 120-piece drum orchestra featuring the Brighton Festival Chorus and a full orchestral string section.

In the summer of 1991, Cresswell and McNicholas produced, financed, and directed the original Stomp show, previewing at London's Bloomsbury Theatre and premiering at the Assembly Rooms in Edinburgh, where it became the Guardian's "Critic's Choice" and won the Daily Express's "Best of the Fringe" award. Originally a seven-piece (with Luke Cresswell, Theseus Gerard, Fraser Morrison, Carl Smith, Nick Dwyer, David Olrod and Sarah Eddy), Stomp grew to be an eight-person outfit with the addition of Fiona Wilkes in the autumn of 1991.

Between 1991 and 1994, the original cast of Stomp played to capacity audiences around the world. The touring culminated in a season at Sadler's Wells Theatre in London in January 1994, where Stomp received an Olivier nomination for the "Best Entertainment Award" and won "Best Choreography Award in a West End show". Also, in 1993, they performed in an advertisement for apples for the Australian Horticultural Corporation.

Stomp began its run at the Orpheum Theatre in New York City in February 1994 winning an Obie Award and a Drama Desk Award for Most Unique Theatre Experience. By the summer of 1994, the first American cast was in place at the Orpheum, freeing the original cast for a tour of North America and Japan. The cast appeared on the American soap opera General Hospital in 1994.

An extended version of Stomp, involving up to 30 cast members, was created for the Brighton Festival and was subsequently presented in Melbourne. It was most recently seen in September 1995 in an open-air production at the Acropolis in Athens and at the Royal Festival Hall in London.

In October 1995, Stomp appeared on an episode of Mister Rogers' Neighborhood.

One by one, the entire cast was interviewed by Space Ghost on the Cartoon Network television sitcom Space Ghost Coast to Coast and appeared on Reading Rainbow in 1996.

=== 2000–present ===
Stomp performed at the Lincoln Memorial at the Millennium celebrations of US President Bill Clinton. During 2000, a Sesame Street special, "Let's Make Music", a collaboration between Stomp and the Muppets, was released on TV and video in North America.

Cresswell and McNicholas began production of their IMAX film, Pulse: A Stomp Odyssey, in Brazil during Carnaval 2000 and completed it in the summer of 2002. Pulse features an international cast, with performances from Kodo, Timbalada and Eva Yerbabuena. It was released in the autumn of 2002 and won two awards at La Geode's film festival in Paris the following year. In 2004, it received the ultimate IMAX Award for Best Film at the GSTA in Montreal.

In September 2002, Stomp entered London's West End at the Vaudeville Theatre, and later that year performed as part of the Royal Variety Show for the second time.

In 2003, a Dolby Digital trailer featuring Stomp performances debuted in cinemas worldwide, and the following year an Emmy-nominated sequence was created for ABC Sports coverage of the World Figure Skating Championships.

In 2006, Stomp's New York production passed its 5000th performance mark. In the same year, Cresswell and McNicholas directed a public service announcement for television called "Stomp Out Litter", which featured the cast "sweeping up" at iconic locations in the five boroughs. They also began filming an IMAX 3D movie about South Africa's Sardine run, released in early 2008.

In addition, they were commissioned to create and produce Pandemonium: the Lost and Found Orchestra in celebration of 40 years of the Brighton Festival. The LFO subsequently performed at the Sydney Opera House as part of the Sydney Festival early in 2007 and at the Royal Festival Hall in London. The show was reworked and renamed for a US tour in 2010: Pandemonium: the Lost and Found Orchestra.

In 2007, Stomp Out Loud opened in Las Vegas at Planet Hollywood Resort & Casino with an expanded cast and performed inside a theatre specifically created for the production.

In August 2012, Stomp contributed to the musical segment of the 2012 Summer Olympics closing ceremony in London.

In October 2017, the show’s creators, Luke Cresswell and Steve McNicholas, announced that the London show would end its 15-year run in January 2018 but were quoted in an article in The Stage as stating that "its closure would not mark the end of Stomp in London."

The New York production closed on 8 January 2023 after over 11,000 performances.

== See also ==
- Stomp Out Loud
- Pulse: A Stomp Odyssey
- List of artists who reached number one on the US Dance chart
- Cookin'
- Blue Man Group
- GEAR
