= Movies Rock =

Movies Rock is a supplement that accompanies The New Yorker, Vanity Fair, and 12 other Condé Nast Publications in November 2007. The magazine, like its sister publication, Fashion Rocks, is intended to run once yearly; it largely serves to promote a televised concert on CBS to air December 7, 2007. The objective of the magazine, which contains features and interviews of musicians and actors, is to promote films and American pop music in the style of Entertainment Weekly. The roughly 100-page magazine contains no page numbers and is written "to make this read like V.F.'s (Vanity Fair's) 13th issue of 2007".
