= Steve McNicholas =

English actor and dance director (born 1955)

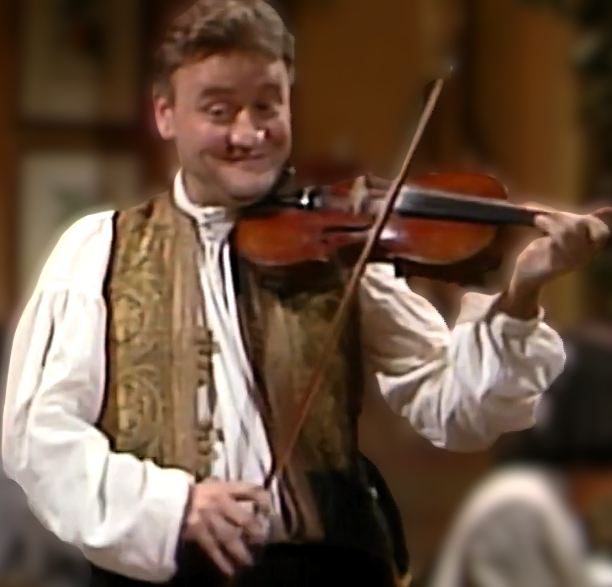
McNicholas in "The Return of Mr. Bean" (1990)

Steven McNicholas (born 11 August 1955) is an English director, composer, actor and co-founder of dance percussion act Stomp.

McNicholas has worked with Cliff Hanger Theatre Co., 7:84, Covent Garden Community Theatre, Pookiesnackenburger Buskers and the Flying Pickets. His work in television includes Rowan Atkinson's Mr. Bean, various soundtrack work with Luke Cresswell and the Yes/No video percussion series for ITV as director. He composed the score of the 1997 film Riot, and shares directorial credits with Cresswell on STOMP-based short films and commercials. He co-wrote and co-directed the 2002 Imax movie Pulse: A Stomp Odyssey and the 3D movie Wild Ocean. Composed and co-directed Pandemonium: the Lost and Found Orchestra.
