= Luke Cresswell =

British musician

Luke Cresswell (born 1 October 1963) is a co-creator (along with Steve McNicholas) of the dance percussion act Stomp. He is a self-taught percussionist and one-time member of British busking/cabaret musical group Pookiesnackenburger. Stomp is famous for using ordinary objects as instruments (dustbins, brooms, etc.)

== Early life ==
His father Peter Cresswell was a painter and the dean of arts at Goldsmiths College, University of London and he grew up in Brighton. His older brother Addison became a notable comedy talent agent.

== Career ==
Cresswell starred in the Channel 4 TV series Stomp, and writes music extensively for TV. He composed the score for the 1997 film Riot. His session work as a percussionist and programmer include; Beats International, Bette Midler, Elvis Costello, Bryan Ferry and Freak Power. With Steve McNicholas, he directed the film links for the 1994 Billboard Music Awards and directed three Target commercials in the United States. Also with McNicholas, he helped direct the HBO special Stomp Out Loud.
