= The Best of Gino Vannelli =

Compilation album by Gino Vannelli
- Released: 1980
- Recorded: 1973–1978
- Genres: soft rock, jazz fusion, yacht rock, pop rock
- Length: 39:28
- Label: A&M
- Producers: Gino Vannelli, Joe Vannelli

Gino Vannelli chronology
Brother to Brother (1978)	The Best of Gino Vannelli (1980)	Nightwalker (1981)

Professional ratings
Review scores
Source	Rating
Rolling Stone Album Guide (1992)	1/5 stars

The Best of Gino Vannelli is the first compilation album by Canadian singer and songwriter Gino Vannelli, originally released in 1980.

== Background ==
Following the success of "I Just Wanna Stop", which went top 5 in both Canada and the United States after A&M had warned Vannelli he needed to take a more commercial approach after the experimental A Pauper in Paradise, Vannelli initially intended to follow it up with a live album. However, at the time "I Just Wanna Stop" hit and for a long time afterwards, Vannelli said that making Brother to Brother was very tough and that he wanted a new direction compared to that album.

The result was that Vannelli would "wait out" the rest of his contract with A&M, and ultimately move for his next new recordings to Arista (although he departed acrimoniously from that label when he recorded Twisted Heart but it would not be released.) To cash in on this, in November 1980, A&M released a best-of Vannelli's six albums for the label.

== Track listing ==
All tracks are written by Gino Vannelli, except where noted.

Side one
No.	Title	Writer(s)	Original release	Length
1.	"People Gotta Move"		Powerful People (1974)	3:18
2.	"Mama Coco"		Storm at Sunup (1975)	3:06
3.	"I Just Wanna Stop"	Ross Vannelli	Brother to Brother (1978)	3:37
4.	"Powerful People"		Powerful People (1974)	6:09
5.	"Crazy Life"		Crazy Life (1973)	2:51
Total length:				19:01

Side two
No.	Title	Original release	Length
1.	"Fly Into This Night"	The Gist of the Gemini (1976)	3:27
2.	"Wheels of Life"	Brother to Brother (1978)	4:14
3.	"One Night With You"	A Pauper in Paradise (1977)	4:18
4.	"Appaloosa"	Brother to Brother (1978)	4:44
5.	"Love Me Now"	Storm at Sunup (1975)	3:44
Total length:			20:27

== Charts ==
Chart (1981)	Peak position
US Top LPs & Tape (Billboard)	172
