= Primetime Emmy Award for Outstanding Sound Mixing for a Variety Series or Special =

Television award category

- Awarded for: Outstanding Sound Mixing for a Variety Series or Special
- Country: United States
- Presented by: Academy of Television Arts & Sciences
- Currently held by: The Apple Music Super Bowl LX Halftime Show Starring Bad Bunny (2026)
- Website: emmys.com

The Primetime Emmy Award for Outstanding Sound Mixing for a Variety Series or Special is awarded to one television series or special each year. Before 1986, limited series and television movies shot on videotape competed alongside variety series and specials. They would later compete separately for Outstanding Sound Mixing for a Limited Series or Movie. Beginning in 2019, nominations are divided between variety series and specials, proportional to the number of submissions of each.

In the following list, the first titles listed in gold are the winners; those not in gold are nominees, which are listed in alphabetical order. The years given are those in which the ceremonies took place:

== Winners and nominations ==
indicates the winner

Outstanding Tape Sound Mixing

=== 1970s ===
Year	Program	Episode	Nominees	Network
1976
1976	The Tonight Show Starring Johnny Carson	"Anniversary Show"	Dave Williams	ABC
1976	New Year's Eve at Pops		Vernon Coleman	PBS
1976	New York Philharmonic with André Previn and Van Cliburn (Live from Lincoln Center)		John Pfeifferm	PBS
1977	Outstanding Achievement in Tape Sound Mixing			
1977	John Denver and Friend		Doug Nelson	ABC
1977	The Adams Chronicles	"John Quincy Adams, President"	Emil Neroda	PBS
1977	The American Music Awards		John Black, Doug Nelson, Norman H. Schwartz	ABC
1977	Police Story	"Ice Time"	Jerry Clemans, Michael T. Gannon, Tom Huth, Phil Seretti	NBC
1977	Outstanding Individual Achievement in Any Area of Creative Technical Crafts (Note: As a juried award, nominees had to garner 50% approval to win the award. The nominees did not meet the benchmark and no award was given.)			
1977	The 28th Annual Emmy Awards		Doug Nelson, Dick Wilson	ABC
1978
1978	Bette Midler: Ol' Red Hair Is Back		Ron Bryan, Edward J. Greene, Thomas J. Huth	NBC
1978	The Lawrence Welk Show	"Roger Williams"	Dick Wilson	Syndicated
1978	The Neil Diamond Special: I'm Glad You're Here with Me Tonight		Val Garay, Bob Gaudio, Rick Ruggieri, Phillip J. Seretti, John Walker	NBC
1978	Our Town		Ron Estes	NBC
1978	Perry Como's Easter by the Sea		Ron Bryan, Grover Helsley, Thomas J. Huth, Eric Lee Levinson, Larry Stephens	ABC
1979	Outstanding Achievement in Tape Sound Mixing			
1979	Steve & Eydie Celebrate Irving Berlin		Edward J. Greene, Dennis S. Sands, Phillip J. Seretti, Garry Ulmer	NBC
1979	The Muppets Go Hollywood		Ed Greene	CBS
1979	Perry Como's Early American Christmas		Tom Huth, Gordon Klimuck	ABC
1979	Return Engagement (Hallmark Hall of Fame)		Phillip J. Seretti, Georja Skinner	NBC
1979	The 3rd Barry Manilow Special		Doug Nelson	ABC
1979	Outstanding Individual Achievement - Creative Technical Crafts (Note: As a juried award, nominees had to garner 50% approval to win the award.)			
1979	Giulini's Beethoven's 9th Live — A Gift from Los Angeles		Tom Ancell	PBS

=== 1980s ===
Year	Program	Episode	Nominees	Network
1980	Outstanding Achievement in Tape Sound Mixing			
1980	Sinatra: The First 40 Years		Bruce Burns, Jerry Clemans	NBC
1980	The Crystal Gayle Special		Terry Farris, Tom Huth, Blake Norton	CBS
1980	The Donna Summer Special		Jerry Clemans, Doug Nelson, Juergen Koppers	ABC
1980	Kenny Rogers and the American Cowboy		Jerry Clemans, Billy Sherrill	CBS
1980	The Oldest Living Graduate		Donald Worsham	NBC
1980	Olivia Newton-John: Hollywood Nights		Jerry Clemans, Gordon F. Klimuck, Doug Nelson	CBS
1980	Outstanding Individual Achievement - Creative Technical Crafts			
1980	Luciano Pavarotti and the New York Philharmonic (Live from Lincoln Center)		Mark Schubin	PBS
1980	Live from Studio 8H: A Tribute to Toscanini		Scott Schachter	NBC
1981	Outstanding Achievement in Tape Sound Mixing			
1981	John Denver with His Special Guest George Burns: Two of a Kind		Jerry Clemans, Doug Nelson, Donald Worsham	ABC
1981	Barbara Mandrell and the Mandrell Sisters	"The Gatlin Brothers"	Jerry Clemans, Matt Hyde, Don Worsham	NBC
1981	Kent State		Don Johnson, Phillip J. Seretti	NBC
1981	Perry Como's Spring in San Francisco		Jerry Clemans, Ed Greene, Phillip J. Seretti	ABC
1981	San Francisco Inaugural Gala		Tom Ancell	PBS
1981	Outstanding Individual Achievement - Creative Technical Crafts (Note: As a juried award, nominees had to garner 50% approval to win the award. The nominee did not meet the benchmark and no award was given.)			
1981	Joan Sutherland, Marilyn Horne and Luciano Pavarotti (Live from Lincoln Center)		Mark Schubin	PBS
1982
1982	Perry Como's Easter in Guadalajara		Chris Haire, Richard J. Masci, Doug Nelson	ABC
1982	Ain't Misbehavin'		Bill Cole, Allen Patapoff, Joe Ralston	NBC
1982	Barbara Mandrell and the Mandrell Sisters	"Ray Charles and Sylvia"	Jerry Clemans, Matt Hyde, Don Worsham	NBC
1982	Debby Boone... One Step Closer		Chris Haire, Russell Terrana, Don Worsham	NBC
1982	Sinatra, The Man and His Music		Jerry Clemans, Joe Ralston	NBC

Outstanding Tape Sound Mixing for a Limited Series or Special

Year	Program	Episode	Nominees	Network
1983
1983	Sheena Easton... Act One		Ron Estes, Edward J. Greene, Carroll Pratt	NBC
1983	Andy Williams: Early New England Christmas		Barton Michael Chiate, Jerry Clemans, Phillip J. Seretti	CBS
1983	The Eddie Rabbitt Special		Bruce Burns, Jerry Clemans, Russ Terrana, Don Worsham	CBS

Outstanding Live and Tape Sound Mixing and Sound Effects for a Limited Series or Special

Year	Program	Episode	Nominees	Network
1984	Outstanding Live and Tape Sound Mixing and Sound Effects for a Limited Series or Special			
1984	Anne Murray's Winter Carnival... From Quebec		Edward J. Greene, Carroll Pratt	CBS
1984	The Magic of David Copperfield VI: Floating Over the Grand Canyon		Jerry Clemans, David E. Fluhr, Richard J. Masci, Joe Ralston	CBS
1984	Mister Roberts (NBC Live Theatre)		John Kantrowe, Joe Ralston	NBC
1984	The 114th Edition of the Ringling Bros. and Barnum & Bailey Circus		Barbara Issak, Eric Lee Levinson, Donald Worsham	CBS
1984	Ray Charles: A Man & His Soul		Jerry Clemans, Craig Porter, Donald Worsham	Syndicated
1984	Outstanding Individual Achievement - Special Sound Achievement			
1984	The Tonight Show Starring Johnny Carson	"Linda Ronstadt and Nelson Riddle"	Ron Estes, John Strain	NBC
1985
1985	Motown Returns to the Apollo		Edward J. Greene, Robert Liftin, Carroll Pratt, Russ Terrana	NBC
1985	Gidget's Summer Reunion		Glen Anderson, Robert L. Harman, Jeremy Huenack	Syndicated
1985	Salute to Lady Liberty		William Angarola, Aaron Baron, Ed Barton, Thomas J. Huth	CBS
1985	Sweeney Todd (Great Performances)		Mark Bovos, Thomas J. Huth, Michael Mitchell	PBS
1985	WonderWorks	Words by Heart	Mark Bovos, Thomas J. Huth, Michael Mitchell	PBS

Outstanding Sound Mixing for a Variety Series or Special

Year	Program	Episode	Nominees	Network
1986
1986	Mr. Previn Comes to Town		Tom Ancell, David E. Fluhr	PBS
1986	The 28th Annual Grammy Awards		Ed Greene, Carroll Pratt, Paul Sandweiss, Don Worsham	CBS
1986	The Kennedy Center Honors: A Celebration of the Performing Arts		Robert Elder, Ed Greene, Carroll Pratt, Paul Sandweiss	CBS
1986	Neil Diamond... Hello Again		Ed Greene, Marshall King, Carroll Pratt, Alan Sides	CBS
1986	The Tonight Show Starring Johnny Carson		Ron Estes, Roger Cortes, Carroll Pratt	NBC
1987
1987	The Tonight Show Starring Johnny Carson	"Dolly Parton, Emmylou Harris, Linda Ronstadt and George Hamilton"	Ron Estes, Roger Cortes, Carroll Pratt	NBC
1987	Carnegie Hall: The Grand Reopening		Aaron Baron, Bud Graham, Edward J. Greene	CBS
1987	Vladimir Horowitz: The Last Romantic (Great Performances)		Lee Dichter, Larry Loewinger	PBS
1987	Minnelli on Minnelli: Liza Remembers Vincente		Eric Lee Levinson	PBS
1988
1988	Dolly	"Down in New Orleans"	Barton Michael Chiate, Gordon Klimuck	ABC
1988	Bob Hope's USO Christmas from the Persian Gulf: Around the World in Eight Days		Steve Deaver, Michael T. Gannon, Tom Huth, Murray McFadden, Billy Youdelman	NBC
1988	The Tonight Show Starring Johnny Carson	"Dan Aykroyd and Miami Sound Machine"	Ron Estes, Roger Cortes	NBC
1989
1989	Outstanding Sound Mixing for a Variety or Music Series or a Special			
1989	Kenny, Dolly and Willie: Something Inside So Strong		Larry Brown, Robert Douglass, David E. Fluhr, Edward J. Greene	NBC
1989	The Arsenio Hall Show	"LeVert, Patti D'Arbanville and Peter DeLuise"	Barton Michael Chiate, Gordon Klimuck	Syndicated
1989	The Glenn Miller Band Reunion		Tom Ancell, David E. Fluhr, Carroll Pratt	PBS
1989	Gregory Hines: Tap Dance in America (Dance in America: Great Performances)		Ed Greene, Carroll Pratt	PBS
1989	The Magic of David Copperfield XI: The Explosive Encounter		Jeff Courtie, David E. Fluhr, Carroll Pratt, Paul Sandweiss	CBS
1989	The Tonight Show Starring Johnny Carson	"Jonathan Winters and Kenny Loggins"	Ron Estes, Roger Cortes	NBC
1989	Outstanding Sound Mixing for Special Events			
1989	The 31st Annual Grammy Awards		Ed Greene, Carroll Pratt, Paul Sandweiss, Don Worsham	CBS

=== 1990s ===
Year	Program	Episode	Nominees	Network
1990
1990	The Arsenio Hall Show	292	Barton Michael Chiate, Gordon Klimuck	Syndicated
1990	Billy Crystal: Midnight Train to Moscow		John Bickelhaupt, Marc A. Gilmartin, Ed Greene	HBO
1990	The 32nd Annual Grammy Awards		Ed Greene, Carroll Pratt, Paul Sandweiss, Don Worsham	CBS
1990	The Kennedy Center Honors: A Celebration of the Performing Arts		John Bickelhaupt, Robert Eldez, Ed Greene	CBS
1991
1991	Carnegie Hall: Live at 100		Edward J. Greene, Terry Kulchar	PBS
1991	The 63rd Annual Academy Awards		Ron Cronkhite, Lee De Carlo, Clark Germaine, Zoli Osaze	ABC
1991	The 33rd Annual Grammy Awards		Randy Ezratty, Ed Greene, Carroll Pratt, Paul Sandweiss, Don Worsham	CBS
1991	The Kennedy Center Honors: A Celebration of the Performing Arts		Robert Eldez, Ed Greene, Carroll Pratt	CBS
1991	Welcome Home Heroes with Whitney Houston		Kooster McAlistar, Don Worsham	HBO
1992
1992	Unforgettable, with Love: Natalie Cole Sings the Songs of Nat King Cole (Great Performances)		John Bickelhaupt, Bill Schnee, Fred Tator	PBS
1992	The 64th Annual Academy Awards		Lee De Carlo, Robert Douglass, Paul Sandweiss	ABC
1992	The Kennedy Center Honors		Robert Eldez, David E. Fluhr, Ed Greene, Rick Himot	CBS
1992	Paul Simon's Concert in Central Park		Randy Erzatty, Stacey Foster, Roy Halee, Rich Travali, Jay Vicari	HBO
1992	The Tonight Show Starring Johnny Carson		Dave A. Cone, Roger Cortes	NBC
1993
1993	Harry Connick Jr.: The New York Big Band Concert		John Alberts, Randy Ezratty, Gregg Rubin	Disney
1993	The 65th Annual Academy Awards		Lee De Carlo, Robert Douglass, Paul Sandweiss	ABC
1993	The 35th Annual Grammy Awards		Edward J. Greene, David Hewitt, Rick Himot, Paul Sandweiss, Don Worsham	CBS
1993	MTV Unplugged	"Bruce Springsteen"	John Alberts, Bob Clearmountain, Toby Scott, Jay Vicari	MTV
1993	Saturday Night Live	"Host: Alec Baldwin"	John Alberts, Josiah Gluck, Bob Palladino, Julie Perez, Chris Arley Seeger, Bill Taylor, Jay Vicari	NBC
1993	Tosca: In the Settings and at the Times of Tosca		Nicola Caponero, Sergio Marcotulli, Claudio Merone, Fabio Venturi	PBS
1994
1994	The Kennedy Center Honors		Edward J. Greene, Rick Himot	CBS
1994	The 66th Annual Academy Awards		Lee De Carlo, Robert Douglass, Paul Sandweiss	ABC
1994	Billy Joel: Shades of Grey (In the Spotlight)		Ken Hahn	PBS
1994	The 36th Annual Grammy Awards		Randy Ezratty, Edward J. Greene, David Hewitt, Richard Maitland, Don Worsham	CBS
1994	Kenny Loggins — Outside: From the Redwoods		Bruce Botnick, Peter R. Kelsey, Terry Nelson	PBS
1995
1995	Barbra Streisand: The Concert		Edward J. Greene, Bruce Jackson, Bob La Masney	Fox
1995	Eagles: Hell Freezes Over		Ken Hahn, Rob Jacobs, Elliot Scheiner	MTV
1995	John Tesh: Live at Red Rocks		Guy Charbonneau, Mitch Dorf, Ross Pallone, Andre Perreault	PBS
1995	The Magic of David Copperfield XVI: Unexplained Forces		Rick Himot, Tamara Johnson Bolm, Glenn T. Labay, Terry McCauley, Paul Sandweiss	CBS
1995	A Special Evening with Elton John		Edward J. Greene, Rick Himot, Terry Kulchar	Disney
1996
1996	Music for the Movies: The Hollywood Sound		Ken Hahn, Richard Lewzet	PBS
1996	The 68th Annual Academy Awards		Robert Douglass, Paul Sandweiss, Tommy Vicari	ABC
1996	Annie Lennox... In the Park		Heff Moraes	Disney
1996	Bonnie Raitt: "Road Tested"		Ed Cherney, Mitch Dorf, Bob LaMasney, Rik Pekkonen	PBS
1996	Sinatra: 80 Years My Way		Robert Douglass, Ed Greene, James Ledner, Gary Lux	ABC
1997
1997	The 69th Annual Academy Awards		Robert Douglass, Edward J. Greene, Tommy Vicari	ABC
1997	Bette Midler: Diva Las Vegas		Kooster McAlistar, Don Worsham	HBO
1997	Bobby McFerrin: Loosely Mozart, The New Innovators		Rob Rapley, Gary Schultz	PBS
1997	Centennial Olympic Games: Opening Ceremonies		Edward J. Greene	NBC
1997	Tony Bennett: Live by Request		John Harris, Andrew Strauber	A&E
1998
1998	The 70th Annual Academy Awards		Patrick Baltzell, Robert Douglass, Edward J. Greene, Tommy Vicari	ABC
1998	Fleetwood Mac: "The Dance"		Sue Pelino, Elliot Scheiner	MTV
1998	Garth: Live from Central Park		John Harris, Mark Miller, Chris Taylor, Don Worsham	HBO
1998	The 40th Annual Grammy Awards		Randy Ezratty, Edward J. Greene, John Harris, Mark Hutchins, Richard Maitland, Don Worsham	CBS
1998	Stomp Out Loud		Ken Hahn, Larry Loewinger, Mike Roberts	HBO
1999
1999	The 41st Annual Grammy Awards		Randy Ezratty, Edward J. Greene, John Harris, Bob LaMasney, Don Worsham	CBS
1999	The 71st Annual Academy Awards		Patrick Baltzell, Robert Douglass, Edward J. Greene, Tommy Vicari	ABC
1999	An All-Star Tribute to Johnny Cash		Thom Cadley, Susan Pelino	TNT
1999	Celine Dion: These Are Special Times		Daniel Baron, Bob LaMasney, Paul Sandweiss, Denis Savage	CBS

=== 2000s ===
Year	Program	Episode	Nominees	Network
2000
2000	Cher: Live in Concert – From the MGM Grand in Las Vegas		Chris Lord-Alge, Guy Carbonneau, Don Worsham, Bob La Masney	HBO
2000	The Kennedy Center Honors		Ed Greene, Bob La Masney, Bob Elder	ABC
2000	The 72nd Annual Academy Awards		Robert Douglass, Edward J. Greene, Tommy Vicari	ABC
2000	The 42nd Annual Grammy Awards		Ed Greene, Don Worsham, Mikael Stewart, John Harris, Robert Colby, Bob La Masney	CBS
2000	One Love: The Bob Marley All-Star Tribute		Don Worsham, Bob La Masney, Errol Brown	TNT
2000	Saturday Night Live: The 25th Anniversary Special		Robert Palladino, Bill Taylor, Chris Seeger, Marty Brumbach, Jay Vicari	NBC
2001
2001	The 73rd Annual Academy Awards		Ed Greene, Thomas Vicari, Robert Douglass	ABC
2001	Barbra Streisand: Timeless		Dave Reitzas	Fox
2001	Bruce Springsteen & The E Street Band		Toby Scott, Bob Clearmountain	HBO
2001	The Tonight Show with Jay Leno	1938	Patrick Lucatorto, Richard Dillon, Ron Sinko, Patrick Smith	NBC
2001	La Traviata from Paris (Great Performances)		Toni Ciano, Valeriano Battisti, Mario Diodato, Alessandra Cerrina, Stefano Lancia, Maurizio Trevisan	PBS
2002
2002	America: A Tribute to Heroes		Paul Sandweiss, Al Centrella, Biff Dawes, Jay Vicari, John Harris	(Note: America: A Tribute to Heroes was simulcast live on 35 network and cable outlets. The Emmys listed no individual network with this nomination.)
2002	Opening Ceremony Salt Lake 2002 Olympic Winter Games		Ed Greene, Patrick Baltzell, David Greene, Shawn Murphy, Joel Iwataki	NBC
2002	A&E in Concert: Sting in Tuscany... All This Time		Andrea Moser, Simon Osborne, Claus Trelby	A&E
2002	Come Together: A Night for John Lennon's Words and Music		Tom Holmes, John Harris	TNT
2002	The Tonight Show with Jay Leno	2180	Patrick Lucatorto, Richard Dillon, Patrick Smith, Ken Gomez, Andy Bass	NBC
2003
2003	The 45th Annual Grammy Awards		Ed Greene, Randy Ezratty, John Harris, Jay Vicari, Dick Maitland, Mikael Stewart, Ron Reaves	CBS
2003	The 75th Annual Academy Awards		Ed Greene, Thomas Vicari, Robert Douglass, Patrick Baltzell	ABC
2003	Robin Williams: Live on Broadway		Ish Garcia	HBO
2003	Rolling Stones – Forty Licks World Tour Live at Madison Square Garden		Don Worsham, Ed Cherney	HBO
2003	The Tonight Show with Jay Leno	2393	Patrick Lucatorto, Richard Dillon, Ken Gomez, Patrick Smith, Andy Bass	NBC
2004
2004	A&E in Concert: Sting – Sacred Love		Evan Adelman, Paul Sandweiss, Randy Faustino, Bob La Masney	A&E
2004	A&E in Concert: Paul McCartney in Red Square		Michael Brauer, Matt Foglia	A&E
2004	The 76th Annual Academy Awards		Ed Greene, Thomas Vicari, Robert Douglass, Patrick Baltzell, Brian Riordan	ABC
2004	Harry Connick: 'Only You' in Concert (Great Performances)		Gregg Rubin, François Lamoureux	PBS
2004	The Tonight Show with Jay Leno	"Live New Year's Eve Show"	Patrick Lucatorto, Richard Dillon, Patrick Smith, Phillip Gephardt, Ken Gomez	NBC
2005
2005	Genius: A Night for Ray Charles		Evan Adelman, Paul Sandweiss, Randy Faustino, Bob La Masney	CBS
2005	The 77th Annual Academy Awards		Ed Greene, Thomas Vicari, Robert Douglass, Patrick Baltzell, Jim Corbett, Bruce Buehlman	ABC
2005	American Idol	"Finale"	Klaus Landsberg, Brian Riordan	Fox
2005	Eric Clapton Crossroads Guitar Festival (Great Performances)		Elliot Scheiner, Mick Guzauski, Ed Cherney, Susan Pelino, Neil Dorfsman	PBS
2005	The 47th Annual Grammy Awards		Ed Greene, Paul Sandweiss, John Harris, Jay Vicari, Don Worsham, Mikael Stewart, Ron Reaves, Klaus Landsberg, Bob La Masney	CBS
2006
2006	78th Annual Academy Awards		Ed Greene, Thomas Vicari, Patrick Baltzell, Robert Douglass, Jamie Santos	ABC
2006	Eagles Farewell I Tour – Live from Melbourne		Elliot Scheiner, Susan Pelino	NBC
2006	American Idol	"American Classics Songbook with Rod Stewart"	Ed Greene, Andrew Fletcher, Paul Sandweiss, Brian Riordan, Conner Moore	Fox
2006	Barry Manilow: Music and Passion		Tom Davis, John Zvolensky, Steve Johnson	PBS
2006	The 48th Annual Grammy Awards		Tom Holmes, John Harris, Eric Schilling, Don Worsham, Mikael Stewart, Ron Reaves, Paul Sandweiss, Klaus Landsberg, Bob La Masney	CBS
2007
2007	Tony Bennett: An American Classic		Dae Bennett, Susan Pelino, Christopher Koch	NBC
2007	The 79th Annual Academy Awards		Ed Greene, Thomas Vicari, Patrick Baltzell, Robert Douglass, Jamie Santos	ABC
2007	The Daily Show with Jon Stewart	12061	Tim Lester	Comedy Central
2007	The 49th Annual Grammy Awards		Tom Holmes, John Harris, Eric Schilling, Paul Sandweiss, Don Worsham, Klaus Landsberg, Mikael Stewart, Ron Reaves, Mike Parker, David Velte, Bob La Masney	CBS
2007	The Magic Flute (Great Performances at the Met)		Jay David Saks, Ken Hahn	PBS
2008
2008	The 50th Annual Grammy Awards		Tom Holmes, Klaus Landsberg, John Harris, Eric Schilling, Eric Johnston, Tom Pesa, Mikael Stewart, Ron Reaves, Mike Parker, Bob La Masney	CBS
2008	The 80th Annual Academy Awards		Ed Greene, Thomas Vicari, Patrick Baltzell, Robert Douglass, Jamie Santos, Conner Moore, Paul Sandweiss	ABC
2008	American Idol	"Finale"	Ed Greene, Randy Faustino, Andrew Fletcher, Mike Parker, Gary Long, Brian Riordan, Conner Moore, Christian Schrader	Fox
2008	Late Night with Conan O'Brien	2524	Fred Zeller, Joe Aebig, Glenn A. Arber, Bruce Leonard, David Winslow	NBC
2008	Super Bowl XLII Halftime Show Starring Tom Petty & the Heartbreakers		Ed Greene, Pablo Munguia, Patrick Baltzell, Robert Douglass, Ryan Ulyate	Fox
2009
2009	The 81st Annual Academy Awards		Ed Greene, Dan Wallin, Robert Douglass, Patrick Baltzell, Pablo Munguia, Mike Parker, Brian Riordan, Adrian Ordonez, Conner Moore, Mark Edmondson	ABC
2009	The 51st Annual Grammy Awards		Tom Holmes, Eric Johnston, Mikael Stewart, Ron Reaves, John Harris, Eric Schilling, Mike Parker, Tom Pesa, Bob La Masney, Paul Sandweiss	CBS
2009	American Idol	"Finale"	Ed Greene, Randy Faustino, Andrew Fletcher, Mike Parker, Gary Long, Brian Riordan, Adrian Ordonez, Conner Moore, Christian Schrader	Fox
2009	Beijing 2008 Olympic Games Opening Ceremony		Wendel Stevens, Ryan Outcalt	NBC
2009	Bruce Springsteen and the E Street Band Super Bowl Halftime Show		Ed Greene, Brendan O'Brien, Pablo Munguia, Robert Douglass, John Cooper, Patrick Baltzell, Monty Carlo, Troy Milner	NBC
2009	Dancing with the Stars	710A	Evan Adelman, Eric Johnston, John Protzko, G. Butch McKarge, Boyd Wheeler	ABC

=== 2010s ===
Year	Program	Episode	Nominees	Network
2010
2010	The 52nd Annual Grammy Awards		Tom Holmes, Eric Johnston, John Harris, Eric Schilling, Mike Parker, Tom Pesa, Ron Reaves, Paul Sandweiss, Pablo Munguia, Bob La Masney, Mikael Stewart	CBS
2010	The 25th Anniversary Rock and Roll Hall of Fame Concert		Carl Glanville, Jay Vicari, Al Centrella, Brian Riordan, Bob Clearmountain, John Harris	HBO
2010	American Idol	"Idol Gives Back" (933)	Ed Greene, Andrew Fletcher, Tim Hatayama, Mike Parker, Gary Long, Brian Riordan, Conner Moore, Adrian Ordonez, Christian Schrader, Bruce Arledge Jr., Randy Faustino, Paul Wittman, Alex Guessard	Fox
2010	American Idol	"Finale" (943)	Ed Greene, Randy Faustino, Andrew Fletcher, Mike Parker, Gary Long, Brian Riordan, Conner Moore, Adrian Ordonez, Christian Schrader	Fox
2010	Dancing with the Stars	907	Evan Adelman, Eric Johnston, John Protzko, Boyd Wheeler	ABC
2010	The 82nd Annual Academy Awards		Ed Greene, Frank Wolf, Pablo Munguia, Robert Douglass, Patrick Baltzell, Mike Parker, Brian Riordan, Adrian Ordonez, Conner Moore, Toby Foster	ABC
2011
2011	American Idol	"Finale"	Ed Greene, Randy Faustino, Patrick Baltzell, Mike Parker	Fox
2011	The 83rd Annual Academy Awards		Paul Sandweiss, Thomas Vicari, Kristian Pedregon, Pablo Munguia	ABC
2011	The 53rd Annual Grammy Awards		Thomas Holmes, John Harris, Eric Schilling, Bob La Masney	CBS
2012
2012	The 84th Annual Academy Awards		Paul Sandweiss, Thomas Vicari, Pablo Munguia, Kristian Pedregon, Bob La Masney, Brian Riordan, Tom Pesa, Mike Parker, Josh Morton, Patrick Baltzell, Larry Reed, John Perez	ABC
2012	American Idol	1144	Brian Riordan, Ed Greene, Randy Faustino, Mike Parker, Patrick Baltzell, Gary Long, Christian Schrader, Conner Moore, Ryan Young	Fox
2012	The 54th Annual Grammy Awards		Tom Holmes, John Harris, Eric Schilling, Paul Sandweiss, Eric Johnston, Mikael Stewart, Ron Reaves, Tom Pesa, Mike Parker, Pablo Munguia, Bob La Masney	CBS
2012	Lionel Richie and Friends		Paul Sandweiss, Biff Dawes, J. Mark King, Dirk Vanoucek, Steve Anderson, Marc Repp, Chip Matthews, Christian Schrader, Jeff Peterson, Jason Spence, Jeffrey Fecteau	CBS
2013
2013	The 55th Annual Grammy Awards		Tom Holmes, Mikael Stewart, John Harris, Eric Schilling, Ron Reaves, Eric Johnston, Pablo Munguia, Tom Pesa, Mike Parker, Bob La Masney	CBS
2013	American Idol	"Finale"	Ed Greene, Brian Riordan, Adrian Ordonez, Ryan Young, Randy Faustino, Gary Long, Patrick Baltzell, Mike Parker, Christian Schrader	Fox
2013	The Colbert Report	8137B	Todd Kilponen, Bob Walker, Robert Selitto, Jay Vicari	Comedy Central
2013	The Daily Show with Jon Stewart	17153	Tim Lester, Horst Hartmann, Rocky Magistro, Jay Vicari	Comedy Central
2013	The Oscars		Paul Sandweiss, Thomas Vicari, Biff Dawes, Pablo Munguia, Kristian Pedregon, Josh Morton, Emily McDonnell, Patrick Baltzell, Mike Parker, Bob La Masney	ABC
2014
2014	The 56th Annual Grammy Awards		Tom Holmes, Eric Johnston, John Harris, Eric Schilling, Mikael Stewart, Ron Reaves, Tom Pesa, Mike Parker, Pablo Munguia, Josh Morton, Bob La Masney	CBS
2014	The Kennedy Center Honors		Tom Holmes, Paul Sandweiss, Dave O'Donnell, Josh Morton, Patrick Baltzell	CBS
2014	The Night That Changed America: A Grammy Salute to The Beatles		Larry Reed, Tom Holmes, Al Schmidt, Giles Martin, Josh Morton, Randy Faustino, Paul Wittman, Paul Sandweiss, Christian Schrader	CBS
2014	The Oscars		Paul Sandweiss, Thomas Vicari, Biff Dawes, Pablo Munguia, Kristian Pedregon, Patrick Baltzell, Mike Parker, Bob La Masney	ABC
2014	The Voice	619A	Michael Abbott, Kenyata Westbrook, Robert P. Matthews Jr., John Koster, Randy Faustino, Ryan Young, Christian Schrader, Tim Hatayama, Michael Bernard, Andrew Fletcher, Bill Dietzman, Eddie Marquez	NBC
2015
2015	Saturday Night Live 40th Anniversary Special		Robert Palladino, Bill Taylor, Marty Brumbach, Ezra Matychak, Robert Selitto, Chris Costello, Devin Emke, Josiah Gluck, Bob Clearmountain	NBC
2015	The 57th Annual Grammy Awards		Tom Holmes, Eric Johnston, John Harris, Eric Schilling, Mikael Stewart, Ron Reaves, Tom Pesa, Mike Parker, Pablo Munguia, Josh Morton, Bob La Masney	CBS
2015	Late Show with David Letterman	4214	Kevin Rogers, Harvey Goldberg, Tom Herrmann, Seth Mintz	CBS
2015	The Oscars		Paul Sandweiss, Biff Dawes, Thomas Vicari, Kristian Pedregon, Patrick Baltzell, Pablo Munguia	ABC
2015	The Voice	"Finale Results"	Michael Abbott, Kenyata Westbrook, Robert P. Matthews Jr., John Koster, Ryan Young, Randy Faustino, Andrew Fletcher, Christian Schrader, Michael Bernard, Eric White, Mike Parker, Eddie Marquez, Bill Dietzman	NBC
2016
2016	Danny Elfman's Music from the Films of Tim Burton (Live from Lincoln Center)		Ken Hahn, Paul Bevan	PBS
2016	Grease: Live		J. Mark King, Biff Dawes, Eric Johnston, Bob LaMasney, Pablo Munguia, Kevin Wapner, John Protzko, John Garlick, Barrance D. Warrick	Fox
2016	Last Week Tonight with John Oliver	225	Charlie Jones, Steve Watson, Steve Lettie, Tony Rollins	HBO
2016	The Oscars		Paul Sandweiss, Tommy Vicari, Marc Repp, Pablo Munguia, Michael Parker, Tom Pesa, Patrick Baltzell, Kristian Pedregon, Bob LaMasney	ABC
2016	The Voice	1018A	Michael Abbott, Randy Faustino, Kenyata Westbrook, John Koster, Robert P. Matthews, Jr., Sterling Cross, Ryan Young, Brian Riordan, Tim Hatayama, Eric White, William Dietzman, Eddie Marquez, Christian Schrader, Andrew Fletcher	NBC
2017
2017	The 59th Annual Grammy Awards		Josh Morton, Thomas Holmes, Mikael Stewart, Eric Schilling, John Harris, Ron Reaves, Thomas Pesa, Michael Parker, Eric Johnston, Pablo Munguia, Bob LaMasney	CBS
2017	2017 Rock and Roll Hall of Fame Induction Ceremony		Al Centrella, Susan Pelino, Jay Vicari, Dave Natale, Erik Von Ranson, Simon Welch	HBO
2017	Last Week Tonight with John Oliver	"Sub-Prime Auto Loans"	Charlie Jones, Steve Watson, Steve Lettie, Jonathan Herrera	HBO
2017	The Oscars		Kristian Pedregon, Paul Sandweiss, Tommy Vicari, Pablo Munguia, Pat Baltzell, Michael Parker, Bob LaMasney, John Perez, Tom Pesa, Brian Flanzbaum	ABC
2017	Super Bowl LI Halftime Show Starring Lady Gaga		Paul Sandweiss, Christian Schrader, Alex Guessard, Simon Higgs, Tom Pesa, Paul Ramsay, Pablo Munguia, Andre Bowman	Fox
2017	The Voice	"Season Finale"	Ryan Young, Brian Riordan, Michael Abbott, Eric White, Tim Hatayama, Randy Faustino, Kenyata Westbrook, Sterling Cross, Robert P. Matthews Jr., John Koster, Andrew Fletcher, Christian Schrader, Carlos Torres, William Dietzman, Michael Bernard	NBC
2018
2018	Jesus Christ Superstar Live in Concert		Thomas Holmes, Ellen Fitton, John Harris, Brian Flanzbaum, Mark Weglinski, David Crawford, Dan Gerhard, Mike Bove, Jason Sears, Christian Schrader	NBC
2018	The 60th Annual Grammy Awards		Thomas Holmes, Mikael Stewart, John Harris, Eric Schilling, Ron Reaves, Thomas Pesa, Simon Welch, Eric Johnston, Pablo Munguia, Josh Morton, Bob La Masney	CBS
2018	Last Week Tonight with John Oliver	421	Steve Watson, Charlie Jones, Patrick Smith, Steve Lettie, Anthony Lalumia, Jason Dyer Sainsbury, Max Perez	HBO
2018	The Oscars		Paul Sandweiss, Kristian Pedregon, Tommy Vicari, Michael Parker, Tom Pesa, Mark Repp, Patrick Baltzell, Christian Schraeder, John Perez, Pablo Munguia	ABC
2018	The Voice	"Live Finale, Part 2"	Michael Abbott, Randy Faustino, Kenyata Westbrook, John Koster, Robert P. Mathews Jr., Brian Riordan, Ryan Young, Tim Hatayama, Eric White, Shaun Sebastian, Michael Bernard, Carlos Torres, Christian Schrader, Andrew Fletcher	NBC
2019
2019	Aretha! A Grammy Celebration for the Queen of Soul		Paul Wittman, Josh Morton, Paul Sandweiss, Kristian Pedregon, Christian Schrader, Michael Parker, Patrick Baltzell	CBS
2019	Carpool Karaoke: When Corden Met McCartney Live from Liverpool		Conner Moore	CBS
2019	The 61st Grammy Awards		Thomas Holmes, Mikael Stewart, John Harris, Eric Schilling, Ron Reaves, Thomas Pesa, Michael Parker, Eric Johnston, Pablo Munguia, Juan Pablo Velasco, Josh Morton, Paul Sandweiss, Kristian Pedregon, Bob La Masney	CBS
2019	Last Week Tonight with John Oliver	"Authoritarianism"	Steve Watson, Charlie Jones, Max Perez, Steve Lettie	HBO
2019	The Oscars		Paul Sandweiss, Tommy Vicari, Pablo Munguia, Kristian Pedregon, Patrick Baltzell, Michael Parker, Christian Schrader, John Perez, Tom Pesa, Mark Repp, Biff Dawes, Timothy Coston, Browning McCollum	ABC

=== 2020s ===
Year	Program	Episode	Nominees	Network
2020
2020	The Oscars		Paul Sandweiss, Tommy Vicari, Biff Dawes, Pablo Munguia, Kristian Pedregon, Patrick Baltzell, Michael Parker, Christian Schrader, John Perez, Marc Repp, Thomas Pesa, Timothy Coston, Browning McCollum	ABC
2020	The Daily Show with Trevor Noah	"Jessie Reyez"	Tim Lester, Patrick Weaver	Comedy Central
2020	Dave Chappelle: Sticks & Stones		Michael Abbott, Brian Riordan, Connor Moore	Netflix
2020	The 62nd Grammy Awards		Thomas Holmes, Mikael Stewart, John Harris, Eric Schilling, Ron Reaves, Thomas Pesa, Michael Parker, Eric Johnston, Pablo Munguia, Juan Pablo Velasco, Bob LaMasney, Josh Morton, Kristian Pedregon, Paul Sandweiss	CBS
2020	Last Week Tonight with John Oliver	"Episode 629"	Steven Watson, Charlie Jones, John Kilgore, Steve Lettie, Paul Special, Tony Rollins, Dave Swanson, Jayson Dyer Sainsbury	HBO
2021
2021	David Byrne's American Utopia		Paul Hsu, Michael Lonsdale, Pete Keppler	HBO
2021	Bruce Springsteen's Letter to You		Kevin O'Connell, Kyle Arzt, Brad Bergbom, Bob Clearmountain	Apple TV+
2021	Hamilton		Tony Volante, Roberto Fernandez, Tim Latham, Justin Rathbun	Disney+
2021	Last Week Tonight with John Oliver	"Trump & Election Results / F*ck 2020"	Siara Spreen, Eleanor Osborne, Lewis Goldstein	HBO
2021	The Late Show with Stephen Colbert	"Live Show Following Capitol Insurrection; Senator Amy Klobuchar, Rep. Adam Kinzinger, Performance by Jamila Woods"	Pierre de Laforcade, Harvey Goldberg, Alan Bonomo	CBS
2022
2022	Adele: One Night Only		Paul Wittman, Tom Elmhirst, Eric Schilling, Josh Morton, Kristian Pedregon, Shane O'Connor, Christian Schrader	CBS
2022	The 64th Annual Grammy Awards		Thomas Holmes, John Harris, Eric Schilling, Christian Schrader, Eric Johnston, Josh Morton, Ron Reaves, Jeffrey Michael Peterson, Mike Parker, Tom Pesa, Juan Pablo Velasco, Aaron Walk	CBS
2022	The Late Show with Stephen Colbert	"First Show Back with an Audience, Dana Carvey as Joe Biden, Interview with Jon Stewart, and Jon Batiste Performs "Freedom""	Pierre de Laforcade, Harvey Goldberg, Alan Bonomo, Tom Herrmann	CBS
2022	The Pepsi Super Bowl LVI Halftime Show Starring Dr. Dre, Snoop Dogg, Mary J. Blige, Eminem, Kendrick Lamar and 50 Cent		Thomas Holmes, Alex Guessard, Dave Natale, Tom Pesa, Christian Schrader, Pablo Munguia	NBC
2022	Saturday Night Live	"Host: John Mulaney"	Robert Palladino, Ezra Matychak, Bob Selitto, Frank J. Duca Jr., Caroline Sanchez, Josiah Gluck, Tyler McDiarmid, Douglas Nightwine, William Taylor, Devin Emke, Eric Pfeifer, Andrew Guastella	NBC
2023
2023	Elton John Live: Farewell from Dodger Stadium		Michael Abbott, Eric Schilling, Matt Herr, Alan Richardson, Christian Schrader	Disney+
2023	Bono & The Edge: A Sort of Homecoming with Dave Letterman		Phil DeTolve, Brian Riordan, Alastair McMillan, Jacknife Lee	Disney+
2023	The 65th Annual Grammy Awards		Thomas Holmes, John Harris, Eric Schilling, Jeffery Peterson, Ron Reaves, Mike Parker, Andres Arango, Eric Johnston, Christian Schrader, Kristian Pedregon, Juan Pablo Velasco, Aaron Walk	CBS
2023	Saturday Night Live	"Co-Hosts: Steve Martin & Martin Short"	Robert Palladino, Ezra Matychak, Frank Duca Jr, Caroline Sanchez, Josiah Gluck, Jay Vicari, Tyler McDiarmid, Christopher Costello, Teng Chen, William Taylor, Geoff Countryman, Devin Emke	NBC
2023	Taylor Hawkins Tribute Concert		Bob Clearmountain, Ollie Nesham, Darrell Thorp, Chris Kalcov, Steve Massey, Eduardo Puhl, Will Langdale, Antony King, Ian Beveridge	Paramount+
2024
2024	Billy Joel: The 100th — Live at Madison Square Garden		Brian Riordan, Phil DeTolve, Peter Gary, Brian Flanzbaum, Josh Weibel, Brian Ruggles	CBS
2024	66th Grammy Awards		Thomas Holmes, John Harris, Eric Schilling, Jeff Peterson, Jaime Pollock, Michael Parker, Andres Arango, Juan Pablo Velasco, Aaron Walk, Eric Johnston, Christian Schrader, Kristian Pedregon	CBS
2024	The Oscars		Paul Sandweiss, Tommy Vicari, Biff Dawes, Pablo Munguia, Kristian Pedregon, Patrick Baltzell, Michael Parker, Christian Schrader, John Perez, Tom Pesa, Steve Genewick	ABC
2024	2023 Rock and Roll Hall of Fame Induction Ceremony		Al Centrella, Bob Clearmountain, John Harris, Dan Gerhard, Robert Scovilm, Mike Bove, Simon Welsh	ABC
2024	Saturday Night Live	"Host: Kristen Wiig"	Robert Palladino, Ezra Matychak, Frank Duca, Christopher Costello, Josiah Gluck, Jay Vicari, Lawrence Manchester, Tyler McDiarmid, Caroline Sanchez, Geoff Countryman, Teng Chen, Devin Emke	NBC
2025
2025	SNL50: The Anniversary Special		Robert Palladino, Ezra Matychak, Frank Duca, Doug Nightwine, Christopher Costello, Caroline Sanchez, Josiah Gluck, Jay Vicari, Tyler McDiarmid, Geoff Countryman, Devin Emke, Teng Chen	NBC
2025	The Daily Show	"Jon Stewart and the News Team Live at the Chicago DNC"	John Neroulas, Patrick Weaver	Comedy Central
2025	The 67th Annual Grammy Awards		Thomas Holmes, John Harris, Eric Schilling, Jamie Pollock, Jeffrey Michael Peterson, Michael Parker, Andres Arango, Juan Pablo Velasco, Aaron Walk, Christian Schrader, Eric Johnston, Doug Wingert	CBS
2025	The Oscars		Paul Sandweiss, Tommy Vicari, Steve Genewick, Tom Pesa, Biff Dawes, Pablo Munguia, Kristian Pedregon, Patrick Baltzell, Michael Parker, Christian Schrader, John Perez	ABC
2025	SNL50: The Homecoming Concert		Thomas Holmes, Christian Schrader, Eric Schilling, Lawrence Manchester, Dan Gerhard, Jason Crystal, Jamie Pollock, Juan Pablo Velasco, Anthony Lalumia, Mike Bové, Cesar Benitez, Talia Krause, Al Theurer	Peacock
2026
2026	The Apple Music Super Bowl LX Halftime Show Starring Bad Bunny		Thomas Holmes, Alex Guessard, Dave Natale, Christian Schrader, Thomas Pesa, Pablo Munguia	NBC
2026	The Late Show with Stephen Colbert	"The Late Show With Stephen Colbert Series Finale"	Jim Murray, Harvey Goldberg, Greg Allen, Alan Bonomo, Jonathan Herrera	CBS
2026	The Muppet Show		Christopher Neely, John Chamberlin, Sean Madsen, Jordan McClain, Sanaa Kelley, David Michel-Ruddy	Disney+
2026	The Oscars		Paul Sandweiss, Tommy Vicari, Biff Dawes, Steve Genewick, Pablo Munguia, Patrick Baltzell, Mike Parker, Tom Pesa, John Perez, Shane O'Connor, Kristian Pedregon	ABC
2026	Taylor Swift | The Eras Tour | The Final Show		David Payne, John Ross	Disney+

== Programs with multiple awards ==
2 awards

- The Tonight Show Starring Johnny Carson

== Programs with multiple nominations ==
8 nominations

- American Idol

7 nominations

- The Tonight Show Starring Johnny Carson

6 nominations

- Last Week Tonight with John Oliver

5 nominations

- The Voice

4 nominations

- Saturday Night Live
- The Tonight Show with Jay Leno

3 nominations

- The Late Show with Stephen Colbert

2 nominations

- The Arsenio Hall Show
- Barbara Mandrell and the Mandrell Sisters
- The Daily Show with Jon Stewart
- Dancing with the Stars
