= Big Dreamers Never Sleep =

Studio album by Gino Vannelli
- Released: February 1987
- Studio: Blue Moon Studio (Los Angeles, California)
- Genre: Pop rock
- Length: 38:49
- Labels: HME, CBS, Polydor (Canada)
- Producers: Gino Vannelli; Joe Vannelli; Ross Vannelli

Gino Vannelli chronology
Black Cars (1985)	Big Dreamers Never Sleep (1987)	Inconsolable Man (1990)

Professional ratings
Review scores
Source	Rating
Rolling Stone Album Guide (1992)	2/5 stars
Hartford Courant	Unfavourable
AllMusic	2/5 stars

Big Dreamers Never Sleep is the ninth studio album by Gino Vannelli, released in 1987. Produced like his previous work with his brothers Joe and Ross, the album was his most successful internationally but a failure in the United States where it became his lowest-charting album since his debut Crazy Life failed to dent the Top 200.

== Background ==
Vannelli at this point in his career was coming off a mixed period, whereby the album Twisted Heart was recorded but no label would release it, followed by a label shift and 1985's Black Cars. Black Cars did not equal the chart success of his earlier A&M albums, and following that album's release Vannelli did not tour and moved from his native Canada to Los Angeles, where he would record his second album for the label.

Big Dreamers Never Sleep was released in North America at the close of winter 1987 and later that year internationally.

After the album further diminished his commercial standing in the United States – despite unprecedented success in Europe and Australia with the single "Wild Horses" – Vannelli did tour not to play music, but to inform children about the problems of illicit drugs. Excluding a few performances in late 1987 after he won a Juno Award for "Wild Horses", he would not return to live concerts until after his next album Inconsolable Man.

== Track listing ==
No.	Title	Writer(s)	Length
1.	"In the Name of Money"	Roy Freeland/Gino Vannelli/Joe Vannelli/Ross Vannelli	3:54
2.	"Time Out"	Jimmy Haslip/G. Vannelli/J. Vannelli/R. Vannelli	4:35
3.	"Wild Horses"	Freeland/G. Vannelli	4:38
4.	"Young Lover"	Freeland/G. Vannelli	3:22
5.	"Down with Love"	Freeland/G. Vannelli	4:24
6.	"Persona Non Grata"	Freeland/G. Vannelli	4:16
7.	"Something Tells Me"	Freeland/G. Vannelli	4:20
8.	"Shape Me Like a Man"	Freeland/G. Vannelli	4:49
9.	"King for a Day"	Freeland/G. Vannelli	4:31
Total length:			38:49

== Personnel ==
Musicians

- Gino Vannelli – vocals
- Joe Vannelli – keyboards, sequencer programming
- Mike Miller – electric guitars, classical guitar
- Jimmy Haslip – 5-string bass, additional drum programming (3)
- David Garibaldi – drums, drum programming, percussion
- Ross Vannelli – additional drum programming (5)
- Marc Russo – saxophones

Backing vocals

- Lisa Fischer
- Maxayn Lewis
- Marylin Scott
- Alfie Silas
- Gino Vannelli
- Ross Vannelli

== Production ==
- Gino Vannelli – producer, engineer
- Joe Vannelli – producer, engineer
- Ross Vannelli – producer
- Bernie Grundman – mastering at Bernie Grundman Mastering (Hollywood, California)
- Shirley Klein – album coordinator
- Tony Lane – art direction
- Nancy Donald – art direction
- Raul Vega – cover photography
- Lester Cohen – inner sleeve photography
- Patrick Rains & Associates – management

== Charts ==
Chart (1987)	Peak position
Australia (Kent Music Report)	31
Canada (RPM)	18
Finland (Official Finnish Charts)	40
Italy (Federazione Industria Musicale Italiana)	15
Netherlands (Dutch Charts)	31
Sweden (Sverigetopplistan)	11
US Billboard 200	160
