= Juno Award for Recording Engineer of the Year =

Canadian music award

The Juno Award for "Recording Engineer of the Year" has been awarded since 1976, as recognition each year for the best recording engineer in Canada.

== Winners ==
=== Recording Engineer of the Year (1976 - 1998) ===
- 1976 - Michel Ethier, Dompierre by François Dompierre
- 1977 - Paul Pagé, Are You Ready For Love by Patsy Gallant
- 1978 - (tie) Terry Brown, Hope by Klaatu AND David Greene, Big Band Jazz by The Boss Brass
- 1979 - Ken Friesen, Let's Keep It That Way by Anne Murray
- 1980 - David Greene, Concerto for Contemporary Violin by Paul Hoffert
- 1981 - Mike Jones, "Factory"" and "We're OK" by Instructions
- 1982 - (tie) Gary Gray, "Attitude" & "For Those Who Think Young"" by Rough Trade AND Keith Stein / Bob Rock, "When It's Over" & "It's Your Life" by Loverboy
- 1983 - Bob Rock, No Stranger To Danger by Payolas
- 1984 - John Naslen, Stealing Fire by Bruce Cockburn
- 1985 - Hayward Parrott, Underworld by The Front
- 1986 - Joe Vannelli / Gino Vannelli, Black Cars
- 1987 - Gino Vannelli / Joe Vannelli, "Wild Horses" & "Young Lover"
- 1989 - Mike Fraser, "Calling America" & "Different Drummer" by Tom Cochrane & Red Rider
- 1990 - Kevin Doyle, Alannah Myles
- 1991 - Gino Vannelli / Joe Vannelli, "The Time of Day" & "Sunset On LA"
- 1992 - Mike Fraser, "Thunderstruck" & "Moneytalks" by AC/DC
- 1993 - Jeff Wolpert / John Whynot, "The Lady of Shallott" by Loreena McKennitt
- 1994 - Kevin Doyle, "Old Cape Cod" & "Cry Me a River" by Anne Murray
- 1995 - Lenny DeRose, "Lay My Body Down" & "Charms" by The Philosopher Kings
- 1996 - Chad Irschick, "O Siem" by Susan Aglukark
- 1997 - Paul Northfield, "Another Sunday" by I Mother Earth, "Leave It Alone" by Moist
- 1998 - Michael Phillip Wojewoda, "Armstrong and the Guys" & "Our Ambassador" by Spirit of the West

=== Best Recording Engineer (1999 - 2002) ===
- 1999 - Kevin Doyle, "Stanstill" by various artists and "Soul On Soul" by Amy Sky
- 2000 - Paul Northfield / Jagori Tanna, "Summertime in the Void" & "When Did You Get Back From Mars?" by I Mother Earth
- 2001 - Jeff Wolpert, "Make It Go Away" & "Romantically Helpless" by Holly Cole
- 2002 - Randy Staub, "How You Remind Me" & "Too Bad" by Nickelback

=== Recording Engineer of the Year (2003 - present) ===
- 2003 - Denis Tougas, "Double Agent" & "Everybody's Got A Story" by Amanda Marshall
- 2004 - Mike Haas / Dylan Heming / Jeff Wolpert, "Heat Wave" and "Something Cool" by Holly Cole
- 2005 - L. Stu Young, "What Do U Want Me 2 Do?" and "If Eye Was the Man in Ur Life" by Prince
- 2006 - Vic Florencia, "Everyday Is a Holiday" and "Melancholy Melody" by Esthero
- 2007 - John "Beetle" Bailey, "Rain" by Molly Johnson and "Sisters of Mercy" by Serena Ryder
- 2008 - Kevin Churko, Black Rain by Ozzy Osbourne
- 2009 - Kevin Churko, "Disappearing" and "The Big Bang" (Simon Collins, U-Catastrophe)
- 2010 - Dan Brodbeck, "Apple Of My Eye" and "Be Careful" (Dolores O’Riordan, No Baggage)
- 2011 - Kevin Churko, "Let It Die", "Life Won’t Wait" (Ozzy Osbourne, Scream)
- 2012 - George Seara, "A Little Bit of Love", Michael Kaeshammer and "Let Go", Laila Biali
- 2013 - Kevin Churko / (co-engineer Kane Churko), "Blood" from Blood by In This Moment; "Coming Down" from American Capitalist by Five Finger Death Punch
- 2014 - Eric Ratz, "Sweet Mountain River" and "The Lion" from Furiosity by Monster Truck
- 2015 - Eric Ratz, "Ghosts" from Ghosts by Big Wreck and "Satellite Hotel" from Black Buffalo by One Bad Son
- 2016 - Shawn Everett, "Don't Wanna Fight", "Gimme All Your Love" from Sound & Color by Alabama Shakes
- 2017 - Jason Dufour, "Push + Pull", "Beck + Call" from Touch by July Talk
- 2018 - Riley Bell, "Get You" by Daniel Caesar feat. Kali Uchis, "We Find Love" by Daniel Caesar
- 2019 - Shawn Everett, "Slow Burn", "Space Cowboy" (Kacey Musgraves, Golden Hour)
- 2020 - John "Beetle" Bailey - "Dividido" (Alex Cuba feat. Silvana Estrada), "Shotgun" (Monkey House)
- 2021 - Serban Ghenea - "Blinding Lights" (The Weeknd); "Positions" (Ariana Grande)
- 2022 - Hill Kourkoutis — "Howler" (SATE), "The Drought" (Tania Joy)
- 2023 - Serban Ghenea — "That's What I Want" (Lil Nas X), "Unholy" (Sam Smith feat. Kim Petras)
- 2024 - Shawn Everett — "Used to Be Young" (Miley Cyrus), "What Now" (Brittany Howard)
- 2025 - Serban Ghenea — "Please Please Please" (Sabrina Carpenter), "Lose Control" (Teddy Swims)
- 2026 - Shawn Everett — "12 to 12", sombr; "End of the World", Miley Cyrus
