= Hurts to Be in Love =

Single by Gino Vannelli

from the album Black Cars
- B-side: "Here She Comes"
- Released: 1985
- Recorded: 1984
- Genre: Soft rock
- Length: 3:39
- Label: Polydor
- Songwriter: Gino Vannelli
- Producers: Gino Vannelli, Joe Vannelli, Ross Vannelli

Gino Vannelli singles chronology
"Black Cars" (1985)	"Hurts to Be in Love" (1985)	"Just a Motion Away" (1985)

"Hurts to Be in Love" is a song by Canadian singer/songwriter Gino Vannelli. Released as a single in 1985, the song was his seventh Top 40 hit in his native Canada, peaking at #19. In the U.S., the song reached #57 on the Billboard Hot 100 and #6 on the Adult Contemporary chart. It appears on his eighth album, Black Cars. The song was produced by the three brothers Gino, Joe, and Ross Vannelli, and written by Gino. It finished at #100 in the Canadian Year-end Chart.

== Track listing ==
Canada 7" single
A. "Hurts to Be in Love" - 3:39
B. "Here She Comes" - 3:18

== Credits ==
- Gino Vannelli – lead vocals
- Joe Vannelli – synthesizers
- Mike Miller – guitars
- Jimmy Haslip – bass guitar
- Mark Craney – drums
- Ross Vannelli – backing vocals
