= Wild Horses (Gino Vannelli song) =

1987 single by Gino Vannelli

Single by Gino Vannelli

from the album Big Dreamers Never Sleep
- B-side: "Shape Me Like a Man"
- Released: 1987
- Studio: Blue Moon (Los Angeles)
- Length: 4:38
- Label: Polydor
- Composer: Gino Vannelli
- Lyricists: Gino Vannelli; Roy Freeland
- Producers: Gino Vannelli; Joe Vannelli; Ross Vannelli

Gino Vannelli singles chronology
"Just a Motion Away" (1985)	"Wild Horses" (1987)	"In the Name of Money" (1987)

Music video
- "Wild Horses" on YouTube

"Wild Horses" is a song by Canadian singer-songwriter Gino Vannelli. Vannelli came up with the track's basis during a trip to Santa Fe, New Mexico, to meet a shaman. He co-wrote the lyrics with Roy Freeland and produced it with his brothers, Joe and Ross Vannelli. The song is about a man who promises never to leave his partner no matter what they experience together. It was included on Vannelli's ninth studio album, Big Dreamers Never Sleep, and released as its lead single in 1987.

"Wild Horses" became a chart hit, reaching number one in South Africa, peaking at number seven in Canada, and entering the top 20 in Australia, Belgium, and the Netherlands. In the United States, the song received plentiful airplay in Minneapolis–Saint Paul, and it eventually peaked at number 55 on the Billboard Hot 100 chart. At the 1987 Juno Awards, "Wild Horses" won Gino and Joe Vannelli the award for Recording Engineer of the Year. The single's music video was directed by Maurice Philips, produced by Kevin Townshend, and shot in Los Angeles.

== Background ==
Gino Vannelli explained how he wrote the song on a Behind the Vinyl podcast. While visiting Peru, Vannelli observed the troublesome events occurring in the country at the time and went to Cusco and Machu Picchu, taking in views from the mountains. This visit affected him greatly, and after he returned home, his wife told him about a shaman he could visit in New Mexico named Jamie, who would be able to help him comprehend the indescribable feelings he experienced during his trip. After landing in Albuquerque, Vannelli rented a convertible and drove quickly to Santa Fe, frequently becoming lost. Struggling to find his way to Santa Fe, Vannelli suddenly came up with the song's topic by believing that not even wild horses could deter him from reaching his destination. By the time he had arrived at Jamie's location, Vannelli had conceived the song's basic instrumentation in his head.

== Composition ==
The song's lyrics are about a man who is in a romantic relationship. As he and his partner drive through Arizona in a flatbed truck, the man states that he intends to put all his energy into his relationship, even if his partner does not want him to, and chooses to "follow [his] heart" instead of "good advice". Even if his partner is physically or mentally abusive, he refuses to stop loving them, even if wild horses try to drag the narrator away. Ray McGinnis of music website Vancouver Signature Sounds speculates that while the man is enduring the relationship, his partner is the one who is drifting away based on how they are acting, possibly because they are daunted by intimacy or total commitment.

== Track listings ==
7-inch single

1. "Wild Horses" – 4:10
2. "Shape Me Like a Man" – 4:51

Canadian 12-inch single

A1. "Wild Horses" (extended remix) – 6:20
B1. "Shape Me Like a Man" – 4:48
B2. "Wild Horses" (remixed single version) – 4:30

West German and Australasian 12-inch single

A1. "Wild Horses" (remix) – 6:20
B1. "Wild Horses" (remix edit) – 4:30
B2. "Shape Me Like a Man" – 4:48

West German maxi-CD single

1. "Wild Horses" (remix) – 6:20
2. "Persona Non Grata" (extended remix) – 5:43
3. "In the Name of Money" (extended remix) – 5:30
4. "Black Cars" – 3:07

== Credits and personnel ==
Credits are lifted from the Big Dreamers Never Sleep liner notes.

Studios

- Recorded and digitally mixed at Blue Moon Studio (Los Angeles)
- Mastered at Bernie Grundman Mastering

Personnel

- Gino Vannelli – music, lyrics, production, engineering
- Roy Freeland – lyrics
- Mike Miller – classical guitar, electric guitar
- Jimmy Haslip – five-string bass, additional drum programming
- Joe Vannelli – keyboards, xylophone, sequencer programming, production, engineering
- David Garibaldi – drums, drum programming, percussion
- Ross Vannelli – production
- Bernie Grundman – mastering

== Charts ==
=== Weekly charts ===
Chart (1987)	Peak position
Australia (Australian Music Report)	9
Belgium (Ultratop 50 Flanders)	13
Canada Retail Singles (The Record)	10
Canada Top Singles (RPM)	7
Canada Adult Contemporary (RPM)	19
Italy Airplay (Music & Media)	10
Netherlands (Dutch Top 40)	7
Netherlands (Single Top 100)	14
South Africa (Springbok Radio)	1
US Billboard Hot 100	55
US Adult Contemporary (Billboard)	33
West Germany (GfK)	30

=== Year-end charts ===
Chart (1987)	Position
Australia (Australian Music Report)	47
Belgium (Ultratop 50 Flanders)	99
Canada Top Singles (RPM)	51
Netherlands (Dutch Top 40)	55
Netherlands (Single Top 100)	75
South Africa (Springbok Radio)	11
