= Black Cars =

Studio album by Gino Vannelli
- Released: November 30, 1984
- Recorded: 1984
- Studios: Larkfield Recording Studio; Westwind Studio (Thousand Oaks, California)
- Genres: Rock, soft rock, new wave
- Length: 33:27
- Labels: HME, CBS, Polydor (Canada)
- Producers: Gino Vannelli; Joe Vannelli; Ross Vannelli

Gino Vannelli chronology
Nightwalker (1981)	Black Cars (1984)	Big Dreamers Never Sleep (1987)

Singles from Black Cars
- 1. "Black Cars" Released: 1985; 2. "Hurts to Be in Love" Released: 1985; 3. "Just a Motion Away" Released: 1985

Professional ratings
Review scores
Source	Rating
Allmusic	3/5 stars
Rolling Stone Album Guide (1992)	2.0/5 stars

Black Cars is the eighth studio album by Gino Vannelli. Produced with his brothers Joe and Ross, the album yielded two hit singles: the title track and "Hurts to Be in Love".

Vannelli was nominated for the 1986 Juno Award for Male Vocalist of the Year, an award he won in 1979. He and Joe won the 1986 Juno Award for Recording Engineer of the Year for the title track.

In 2026, the hit single “Black Cars” from this album is featured in Grand Theft Auto VI.

== Track listing ==
Side one
No.	Title	Writer(s)	Length
1.	"Black Cars"	Gino Vannelli/Roy Freeland	3:07
2.	"The Other Man"	Gino Vannelli/Roy Freeland	3:37
3.	"It's Over"	Gino Vannelli/Ross Vannelli/Roy Freeland	3:40
4.	"Here She Comes"	Gino Vannelli	3:18
5.	"Hurts to Be in Love"	Gino Vannelli	3:39
Total length:			17:21

Side two
No.	Title	Writer(s)	Length
1.	"Total Stranger"	Gino Vannelli/Roy Freeland/Bill LaBounty	4:53
2.	"Just a Motion Away"	Gino Vannelli/Ross Vannelli	4:18
3.	"Imagination"	Gino Vannelli	3:04
4.	"How Much"	Gino Vannelli	3:51
Total length:			16:06

== Singles ==
The following singles were released from the album, with the highest charting positions listed.

#	Title	Date	Hot 100	CAN
1.	"Black Cars"	1985	42	4
2.	"Hurts to Be in Love"	1985	57	14
3.	"Just a Motion Away"	1985	—	79

== Personnel ==
Musicians

- Gino Vannelli – vocals, guitars (1, 3, 7, 8), drums (3, 6, 9), drum programming (7), percussion (9)
- Joe Vannelli – synthesizers, synth bass (2, 4, 8, 9), acoustic piano (3, 7, 9), electric piano (6, 9), drum programming (7)
- Mike Miller – guitars (2, 4–6), lead guitar (3, 7), acoustic guitar (8)
- Jimmy Haslip – bass guitar (1, 4–7)
- Ross Vannelli – bass guitar (3), drum programming (7), percussion (7)
- David Garibaldi – drums (1)
- Mark Craney – drums (2, 4, 5, 8)

Background vocals

- Gino Vannelli – backing vocals (2, 4, 7)
- Ross Vannelli – backing vocals (2–6, 9)
- John Messerschmidt – backing vocals (2)
- Lori Lieberman – backing vocals (9)

== Production ==
- Gino Vannelli – producer, arrangements, engineer
- Joe Vannelli – producer, arrangements, engineer
- Ross Vannelli – producer, arrangements
- Ron Capone – recording
- Bernie Grundman – mastering at Bernie Grundman Mastering (Hollywood, California)
- Shirley Klein – album coordinator
- Michael Hodgson – art direction, design
- Moshea Brakha – photography
- Maria Sarno – stylist
- Patrick Raines & Associates – management
