= Living Inside Myself =

Single by Gino Vannelli

from the album Nightwalker
- B-side: "Stay With Me"
- Released: March 1981
- Recorded: 1980
- Genre: Soft rock; blue-eyed soul
- Length: 4:23
- Label: Arista
- Songwriter: Gino Vannelli
- Producers: Gino Vannelli; Joe Vannelli; Ross Vannelli

Gino Vannelli singles chronology
"The River Must Flow" (1979)	"Living Inside Myself" (1981)	"Nightwalker" (1981)

Music video
- "Living Inside Myself" on YouTube

"Living Inside Myself" is a song written and performed by Canadian singer-songwriter Gino Vannelli. It appears on his seventh album, Nightwalker. The song was produced by the three brothers Gino, Joe, and Ross Vannelli.

== Premise and composition ==
In terms of the storyline, the song's narrator finds himself living inside both himself and "this hell" without his former love. The main frame of the song is in B major, while the chorus progresses from A major to D flat.

== Chart performance ==
Released as a single in 1981 in his native Canada, the song went to No. 13 on the RPM Top Singles chart and No. 2 on Canada's Adult Contemporary chart. and was his second top ten hit in the U.S. during the spring and summer of 1981, peaking at No. 6 on the Billboard Hot 100. "Living Inside Myself" reached No. 5 on the Billboard Adult Contemporary chart in the U.S.

=== Weekly singles charts ===
Chart (1981)	Peak position
Australia (Kent Music Report)	86
Canada RPM Top Singles	13
Canada RPM Adult Contemporary	2
US Billboard Hot 100	6
US Adult Contemporary (Billboard)	5
US Hot R&B/Hip-Hop Songs (Billboard)	45
U.S. Cash Box Top 100	9

=== Year-end charts ===
Chart (1981)	Rank
Canada RPM	85
U.S. Billboard Hot 100	34
U.S. Cash Box	78

== Track listing ==
US 7" single
A. "Living Inside Myself" - 4:23
B. "Stay with Me" - 4:42
