= Nightwalker =

Nightwalker may refer to:

== Common uses ==
- A prostitute who works at night
- A person who sleepwalks at night
- A person who wanders at night which might alarm people; see Common law offence

== Arts and entertainment ==
- Nightwalker (album), the 1981 album by Gino Vannelli
- Nightwalker: The Midnight Detective, an anime television series based on a video game
- The night form of the Shishigami (Spirit of the Forest), a character in Princess Mononoke

== Folklore and mythology ==
- A translation of the Japanese Daidarabotchi, a giant in Japanese mythology
- A literal translation of many terms (such as Sanskrit tāmisra, niśācara, and kṣaṇada) for the rākṣasas, a class of Indian demons
- A synonym for vampire
