= Tommy Vicari =

- Born: Thomas Vicari; August 24, 1948 (age 78); Erie, Pennsylvania
- Occupations: Mixing engineer; Recording engineer; Record producer; Scoring mixer

Thomas Vicari (born August 24, 1948) is an American recording engineer, mixing engineer, record producer and scoring mixer known for his work with Quincy Jones, Gino Vannelli, Nicholas Britell, Thomas Newman, Prince, George Duke and Barbra Streisand. He was the sound mixer for TV shows and films including Six Feet Under, The Newsroom, Behind the Candelabra, Phantom of the Paradise, Finding Nemo, Finding Dory, Wall-E and Road to Perdition.

He has been the sound mixer for the Oscars telecast since 1996, commissioned by that year's executive producer, Quincy Jones. Vicari has won two Grammy Awards, eight Emmy Awards and two Cinema Audio Society Awards.

== Early life ==
Vicari grew up in Southern California. His mother was a singer and his uncles were musicians, exposing him to artists like Frank Sinatra and Nat King Cole from an early age. During his teenage years, he was drawn by artists of the British Invasion, especially The Beatles.

== Career ==
Vicari started his career at Capitol Records in the early 1970s. After completing a three-month engineering apprenticeship program at A&M Studios, he became assistant engineer and later recording engineer. During his time at A&M, Vicari recorded artists including Barbra Streisand, Cat Stevens and Joni Mitchell.

After four years at A&M, Vicari became staff engineer at Sound Labs. In 1976, he became an independent engineer, recording at different locations including Conway Recording Studios, Record Plant and Lion Share Recording Studios. Vicari was executive producer and recording engineer on Prince's 1978 debut album For You, recorded at Record Plant in Sausalito, California.

Vicari worked on film since the early stages of his career. In 1971, he was credited as part of the sound department on Joe Cocker's concert film Mad Dogs & Englishmen. He was scoring mixer on the 1974 film Phantom of the Paradise directed by Brian De Palma and the 1976 film A Star Is Born directed by Frank Pierson.

In 1996, he was commissioned by Quincy Jones, executive producer of the 68th Academy Awards, to mix the sound for the telecast. Vicari continues to mix the live orchestra at the Academy Awards ceremony to this day.

After mixing the 68th Academy Awards, Vicari mixed a track composed by Thomas Newman for the 1998 film Meet Joe Black, directed by Martin Brest. The track was ultimately not used in the film. In 2001, Vicari mixed the main theme for the TV series Six Feet Under, also composed by Newman. Vicari continued working with Newman on films including Cinderella Man, Jarhead, Wall-E and Bridge of Spies.

In March 2005, Vicari founded his own production company, Vicari Sound Organization (VSO). The 2019 album Almost Midnight by Italian artist Filippo Perbellini was produced by Vicari for VSO and features Abraham Laboriel on bass, Steve Ferrone on drums, Luis Conte on percussion.

A significant part of Vicari's career has been dedicated to working with Italian artists including Laura Pausini, Eros Ramazzotti, Pino Daniele, Umberto Tozzi, Raf and Giorgia. He is credited on the albums Dove c'è musica by Eros Ramazzotti and La mia risposta by Laura Pausini, both of which reached number 1 on the Italian Albums Chart and on "Tutto Tozzi" by Umberto Tozzi which was gold certified by the Federazione Industria Musicale Italiana.

== Awards ==
=== Grammy Awards ===
Year	Title	Artist	Category	Role	Result
1975	Powerful People	Gino Vannelli	Best Engineered Recording, Non-Classical	Engineer	Nominated
1976	Storm At Sunup	Gino Vannelli	Best Engineered Recording, Non-Classical	Engineer	Nominated
1984	Bossa Nova Hotel	Michael Sembello	Best Engineered Recording, Non-Classical	Engineer	Nominated
1997	Q's Jook Joint	Quincy Jones	Best Engineered Recording, Non-Classical	Engineer	Won
2007	That Phat Pack	Gordon Goodwin's Big Phat Band	Best Engineered Recording, Non-Classical	Engineer	Nominated
2015	Life In The Bubble	Gordon Goodwin's Big Phat Band	Best Large Jazz Ensemble Album	Engineer	Won

=== Emmy Awards ===
Year	Nominated work	Category	Network	Result
1996	68th Academy Awards	Outstanding Sound Mixing for a Variety or Music Series or Special	ABC	Nominated
1997	69th Academy Awards	Outstanding Sound Mixing for a Variety or Music Series or Special	ABC	Won
1998	70th Academy Awards	Outstanding Sound Mixing for a Variety or Music Series or Special	ABC	Won
1999	71st Academy Awards	Outstanding Sound Mixing for a Variety or Music Series or Special	ABC	Nominated
2000	72nd Academy Awards	Outstanding Sound Mixing for a Variety or Music Series or Special	ABC	Nominated
2001	73rd Academy Awards	Outstanding Sound Mixing for a Variety or Music Series or Special	ABC	Won
2003	75th Academy Awards	Outstanding Sound Mixing for a Variety or Music Series or Special	ABC	Nominated
2004	76th Academy Awards	Outstanding Sound Mixing for a Variety or Music Series or Special	ABC	Nominated
2005	77th Academy Awards	Outstanding Sound Mixing for a Variety or Music Series or Special or Animation	ABC	Nominated
2006	78th Academy Awards	Outstanding Sound Mixing for a Variety or Music Series or Special or Animation	ABC	Won
2007	79th Academy Awards	Outstanding Sound Mixing for a Variety or Music Series or Special	ABC	Nominated
2008	80th Academy Awards	Outstanding Sound Mixing for a Variety or Music Series or Special	ABC	Nominated
2011	83rd Academy Awards	Outstanding Sound Mixing for a Variety or Music Series or Special	ABC	Nominated
2012	84th Academy Awards	Outstanding Sound Mixing for a Variety Series or Special	ABC	Won
2013	85th Academy Awards	Outstanding Sound Mixing for a Variety Series or Special	ABC	Nominated
2013	Behind the Candelabra	Outstanding Sound Mixing for a Miniseries or a Movie	HBO	Won
2014	86th Academy Awards	Outstanding Sound Mixing for a Variety Series or Special	ABC	Nominated
2015	87th Academy Awards	Outstanding Sound Mixing for a Variety Series or Special	ABC	Nominated
2016	88th Academy Awards	Outstanding Sound Mixing for a Variety Series or Special	ABC	Nominated
2017	89th Academy Awards	Outstanding Sound Mixing for a Variety Series or Special	ABC	Nominated
2018	90th Academy Awards	Outstanding Sound Mixing for a Variety Series or Special	ABC	Nominated
2019	91st Academy Awards	Outstanding Sound Mixing for a Variety Series or Special	ABC	Nominated
2020	92nd Academy Awards	Outstanding Sound Mixing for a Variety Series or Special	ABC	Won
2023	Succession: Connor's Wedding	Outstanding Sound Mixing for a Comedy or Drama Series (One-Hour)	HBO	Nominated
2024	96th Academy Awards	Outstanding Sound Mixing for a Variety Series or Special	ABC	Nominated

=== Cinema Audio Society Awards ===
Year	Nominated work	Category	Role	Result
2014	Behind the Candelabra	Outstanding Achievement in Sound Mixing for Motion Picture - Live Action	Scoring mixer	Won
2016	Bridge of Spies	Outstanding Achievement in Sound Mixing for Motion Picture - Live Action	Scoring mixer	Nominated
2017	Finding Dory	Outstanding Achievement in Sound Mixing for Motion Picture - Animated	Scoring mixer	Won

=== Online Film & Television Association Awards ===
Year	Nominated work	Category	Network	Result
2014	Behind the Candelabra	Best Sound in a Non-Series	HBO	Nominated
2014	The 85th Annual Academy Awards	Best Sound in a Non-Series	ABC	Nominated
