= A Pauper in Paradise =

Studio album by Gino Vannelli
- Released: 1977
- Studios: AIR Recording Studios, London, England; EMI Abbey Road Studios, London, England
- Genres: Pop rock, Art Rock, Progressive Rock, Contemporary Classical, Avant Garde
- Length: 40:53
- Label: A&M
- Producers: Gino Vannelli; Joe Vannelli

Gino Vannelli chronology
The Gist of the Gemini (1976)	A Pauper in Paradise (1977)	Brother to Brother (1978)

Professional ratings
Review scores
Source	Rating
AllMusic	3/5 stars
Rolling Stone Album Guide (1992)	0.5/5 stars

A Pauper in Paradise is the fifth studio album by Italian-Canadian singer Gino Vannelli, released in 1977. It was notable for including contributions by the Royal Philharmonic Orchestra on the second side, including a fifteen-minute title track symphony that took Gino five months to write, and which led A&M to offer a warning to Gino to expand his appeal or face rapid declines in album sales that since Powerful People had been a steady 300,000 albums per release.

== Track listing ==
All tracks are written by Gino Vannelli.

Side A
No.	Title	Length
1.	"Mardi Gras"	3:28
2.	"Valleys of Valhalla"	4:23
3.	"The Surest Things Can Change"	4:36
4.	"One Night with You"	4:19
5.	"A Song and Dance"	3:40
Total length:		20:26

Side B
No.	Title	Length
1.	"Black and Blue"	4:23
2.	"A Pauper in Paradise: 1st Movement (Note: On some issues of the album, the last four tracks were combined into a single track titled “A Pauper in Paradise (In Four Movements)”)"	4:46
3.	"A Pauper in Paradise: 2nd Movement"	2:39
4.	"A Pauper in Paradise: 3rd Movement"	4:22
5.	"A Pauper in Paradise: 4th Movement"	4:20
Total length:		20:27

== Detailed personnel ==
- Art Direction – Fabio Nicoli, Roland Young (3)
- Backing Vocals – Jay Stone, Joanie Bartels
- Backing Vocals, Design, Artwork – Joanne Jayde
- Drums – Casey Scheuerell
- Engineer – John Kurlander (tracks: 7 to 10), Norm Kinney
- Engineer [Assistent] – Steve Prestage
- Engineer [Re-mix] – Jon Kelly
- Keyboards – Chris Rhyne
- Leader – Barry Griffiths (tracks: 7 to 10)
- Lyrics By, Music By – Gino Vannelli
- Mastered By – Bernie Grundman
- Orchestra – The Royal Philharmonic Orchestra (tracks: 7 to 10)
- Orchestrated By, Conductor – Don Sebesky (tracks: 7 to 10)
- Percussion – Dido* (tracks: 6), John J. Mandel
- Photography By – Beth Kelly
- Producer, Arranged By, Keyboards – Joe Vannelli
- Saxophone – Dick Morrissey
- Synthesizer, Synthesizer [Bass], Piano, Backing Vocals – Bill Meyers
- Vocals [Choir] – The John McCarthy Choir (tracks: 7 to 10)
- Vocals, Producer, Arranged By – Gino Vannelli

== Technical personnel ==
- Jon Kelly – Remixing
- Norm Kinney – Engineer
- John Kurlander – Engineer
- Steve Prestage – Assistant Engineer
- Fabio Nicoli – Art Direction
- Roland Young – Art Direction

== Musicians ==
- Gino Vannelli – lead vocals
- Joe Vannelli – Fender Rhodes, piano, programming, synthesizer, synthesizer arrangements, synthesizer string arrangement, backing vocals
- Bill Meyers – piano, synthesizer, synthesizer bass, backing vocals
- Nyboma Mwan Dido – bongos, congas
- Jay Graydon – guitar
- Casey Scheuerell – drums
- John J. Mandel – percussion, timbales
- Chris Rhyne – keyboards, synthesizer bass
- Royal Philharmonic Orchestra – orchestra on "Black and Blue" and "A Pauper in Paradise"

== Charts ==
Chart (1977)	Peak position
Canada (RPM Magazine)	29
US Billboard 200	33
