= The Gist of the Gemini =

Studio album by Gino Vannelli
- Released: September 21, 1976
- Recorded: 1976
- Studios: AIR Studios, London
- Genres: Jazz rock, progressive rock
- Length: 42:19
- Labels: A&M
- Producers: Gino Vannelli; Joe Vannelli; Geoff Emerick

Gino Vannelli chronology
Storm at Sunup (1975)	The Gist of the Gemini (1976)	A Pauper in Paradise (1977)

Singles from The Gist of the Gemini
- 1. "Love of My Life" Released: 1976

Professional ratings
Review scores
Source	Rating
Allmusic	3/5 stars
Rolling Stone Album Guide (1992)	0.5/5 stars
Christgau's Record Guide	D

The Gist of the Gemini is the fourth studio album by Italian-Canadian singer Gino Vannelli. The album was released in 1976 and was produced by Gino and his brother Joe Vannelli, together with Geoff Emerick.

== Track listing ==
All tracks are written by Gino Vannelli.

Side A
No.	Title	Length
1.	"Love of My Life"	4:32
2.	"Ugly Man"	3:55
3.	"A New Fix for '76"	3:34
4.	"Omens of Love"	4:33
5.	"Fly into This Night"	3:26
Total length:		20:26

Side B
No.	Title	Length
1.	"War Suite": 1. "Prelude to the War (instrumental)" 2. "The Battle Cry (instrumental)" 3. "To the War"; 4. "Carnal Question"; 5. "After the Last Battle (instrumental)" 6. "To the War (Reflection)" ("The Battle Cry" written by Joe Vannelli)	17:45
2.	"Summers of My Life"	4:34
Total length:		22:22

== Personnel ==
- Gino Vannelli – lead vocals, backing vocals, acoustic piano (6), clavinet (8, 11)
- Joe Vannelli – acoustic and electric pianos, clavinet, synthesizers, string and brass arrangements
- Richard Baker – organ, synthesizers, synth bass, string and brass arrangements
- Jay Graydon – electric guitars
- Ross Vannelli – acoustic guitars, backing vocals
- Graham Lear – drums
- John J. Mandell – timpani, percussion
- Dido Morris – congas, cuica, timbales
- Dianne Brooks – backing vocals
- Brenda Russell – backing vocals
- The John McCarthy Choir – backing vocals (6)

== Production ==
- Gino Vannelli – producer, arrangements
- Joe Vannelli – producer, arrangements
- Geoff Emerick – producer, engineer
- Jon Kelly – assistant engineer
- Steve Prestage – assistant engineer
- Norm Kinney – remixing at Sound Labs (Hollywood, California)
- Bernie Grundman – mastering at A&M Studios (Hollywood, California)
- Fabio Nicola – art direction
- Clive Arrowsmith – photography
- Gered Mankowitz – photography

== Charts ==
Chart (1976)	Peak position
Canada (RPM Magazine)	14
US Billboard 200	33
Netherlands (Dutch Charts)	4

=== Singles ===
Year	Single	Chart	Position
1976	"Love of My Life"	Canada (RPM Magazine)	55
1976	"Love of My Life"	United States Billboard Hot 100	64
