= Brother to Brother (Gino Vannelli album) =

Studio album by Gino Vannelli
- Released: September 9, 1978
- Recorded: 1978
- Studios: Davlen Sound Studios (North Hollywood, California); Group IV Recording Studios (Hollywood, California)
- Length: 41:00
- Label: A&M
- Producers: Gino Vannelli; Joe Vannelli; Ross Vannelli

Gino Vannelli chronology
A Pauper in Paradise (1977)	Brother to Brother (1978)	Nightwalker (1981)

Professional ratings
Review scores
Source	Rating
Allmusic	4/5 stars
Rolling Stone Album Guide (1992)	0.5/5 stars

Brother to Brother is the sixth studio album by Canadian singer Gino Vannelli. Despite its success—the biggest of Vannelli's career—it was also his last for A&M Records. The album was released in September 1978 and featured "I Just Wanna Stop", Vannelli's highest-charting single to date in both the US and Canada, where the single reached #4 and #1, respectively. Two other singles were released from the LP: "Wheels of Life" (U.S. #78, Canada #31) and "The River Must Flow" (Canada #80).

== Track listing ==
All tracks are written by Gino Vannelli, except where noted.

Side one
No.	Title	Writer(s)	Length
1.	"Appaloosa"		4:44
2.	"The River Must Flow"		3:48
3.	"I Just Wanna Stop"	Ross Vannelli	3:37
4.	"Love and Emotion"	Ross Vannelli	3:49
5.	"Feel Like Flying"		5:17
Total length:			20:25

Side two
No.	Title	Length
1.	"Brother to Brother"	7:16
2.	"Wheels of Life"	4:14
3.	"The Evil Eye"	4:14
4.	"People I Belong To"	4:01
Total length:		19:45

== Charts ==
=== Weekly charts ===
Chart (1978–1979)	Peak position
Australia (Kent Music Report)	78
Canada (RPM)	3
Dutch Albums (Album Top 100)	43
US Billboard 200	13

=== Year-end charts ===
Chart (1978)	Position
Canada Top Albums/CDs (RPM)	45
Chart (1979)	Position
Canada Top Albums/CDs (RPM)	43
US Billboard 200	47

== Personnel ==
- Gino Vannelli – vocals
- Joe Vannelli – electric piano, synthesizers
- Carlos Rios – guitars
- Leon Gaer – synthesized electric bass (1–4, 7, 8)
- Jimmy Haslip – electric bass (5, 6, 9), bass solo (6)
- Mark Craney – drums
- Manolo Badrena – percussion
- Victor Feldman – vibraphone
- Ernie Watts – tenor saxophone
- Stephanie Spruill – backing vocals
- Julia Tillman Waters – backing vocals
- Maxine Waters Willard – backing vocals
- Ross Vannelli – backing vocals

== Production ==
- Gino Vannelli – producer, arrangements
- Joe Vannelli – producer, arrangements
- Ross Vannelli – producer, arrangements
- Norm Kinney – recording, mixing
- Chris Desmond – assistant engineer
- Paul Aronoff – remix assistant
- Betty Banghart – remix assistant
- Bernie Grundman – mastering at A&M Studios (Hollywood, California)
- Roland Young – art direction
- Grafis – design
- Mark Hanauer – photography
