= Nightwalker (album) =

Studio album by Gino Vannelli
- Released: March 1981
- Studio: Smoketree Ranch (Chatsworth, California)
- Genre: Adult contemporary; jazz rock
- Length: 36:34
- Label: Arista
- Producer: Gino Vannelli; Joe Vannelli; Ross Vannelli

Gino Vannelli chronology
Brother to Brother (1978)	Nightwalker (1981)	Black Cars (1984)

Professional ratings
Review scores
Source	Rating
Allmusic	4/5 stars
Rolling Stone Album Guide (1992)	0.5/5 stars

Nightwalker is the seventh studio album by Canadian singer Gino Vannelli. The album was released in 1981, featuring the title track, which reached No. 41 in the U.S., and "Living Inside Myself", which reached No. 6 in the U.S. and No. 13 in Canada.

== Track listing ==
All tracks are written by Gino Vannelli, except where noted.

Side one
No.	Title	Writer(s)	Length
1.	"Nightwalker"		5:07
2.	"Seek and You Will Find"	Gino Vannelli, Joe Vannelli, Ross Vannelli	4:40
3.	"Put the Weight on My Shoulders"		4:45
4.	"I Believe"	Gino Vannelli, Ross Vannelli	4:11
Total length:			18:45

Side two
No.	Title	Length
1.	"Santa Rosa"	4:12
2.	"Living Inside Myself"	4:23
3.	"Stay With Me"	4:43
4.	"Sally (She Says the Sweetest Things)"	4:29
Total length:		17:49

== Personnel ==
- Gino Vannelli – lead vocals, backing vocals
- Brad Cole – acoustic piano, string arrangements
- Joe Vannelli – acoustic piano, electric piano, organ, synthesizers, string arrangements
- Mike Miller – electric guitars, acoustic guitars
- Neil Stubenhaus – bass
- Vinnie Colaiuta – drums
- Michael Fisher – congas, percussion
- David Boruff – saxophone
- Doug Parry – backing vocals
- Stephanie Spruill – backing vocals
- Ross Vannelli – backing vocals
- Julia Tillman Waters – backing vocals
- Maxine Waters Willard – backing vocals

== Production ==
- Gino Vannelli – producer, arrangements
- Joe Vannelli – producer, arrangements
- Ross Vannelli – producer, arrangements
- Norm Kinney – engineer
- Doug Parry – assistant engineer
- Rick Romano – assistant engineer
- Bernie Grundman – mastering at A&M Studios (Hollywood, California)
- Ria Lewerke-Shapiro – art direction
- Mark Hanauer – photography
- Renaissance Management – direction
