= People Gotta Move =

1974 single by Gino Vannelli

Single by Gino Vannelli

from the album Powerful People
- B-side: "Son of a New York Gun"
- Released: 1974
- Recorded: 1974
- Genre: Soft rock • funk • disco
- Length: 3:18
- Label: A&M Records
- Songwriter: Gino Vannelli
- Producers: Gino Vannelli, Joe Vannelli

Gino Vannelli singles chronology
"Never Cry Again" (1970)	"People Gotta Move" (1974)	"Powerful People" (1974)

“People Gotta Move” is a 1974 song written and performed by Gino Vannelli, for his album Powerful People. Released during the rise in popularity of disco, it was his first chart hit, peaking within the top 40 on both the Billboard Hot 100 and the RPM Singles Chart.

== Background ==
After his first album, Crazy Life, was a commercial flop, Vannelli assembled a backing band and recorded songs for the album Powerful People, one of which was “People Gotta Move”.

In 2008, the single was used in the Netherlands for advertisements for ANWB.

== Charts ==
=== Weekly singles charts ===
Chart (1974)	Peak position
Canada Top Singles (RPM)	21
US Billboard Hot 100	22
