= Storm at Sunup =

Studio album by Gino Vannelli
- Released: July 1975
- Studios: A&M (Hollywood, California)
- Genres: Jazz fusion, Art rock, Progressive rock
- Length: 35:56
- Label: A&M
- Producers: Gino Vannelli; Joe Vannelli

Gino Vannelli chronology
Powerful People (1974)	Storm at Sunup (1975)	The Gist of the Gemini (1976)

Professional ratings
Review scores
Source	Rating
All Music Group	4.0/5 stars
Rolling Stone Album Guide (1992)	1.0/5 stars

Storm at Sunup is the third album by Italian-Canadian jazz-pop singer-songwriter, Gino Vannelli, and was produced by Vannelli and his brother Joe. Unlike his other albums, Storm at Sunup is a jazz fusion album with much less pop influence, though earlier hits such as "People Gotta Move" and "Powerful People" do show jazz influences. The album features contributions by Graham Lear, who would soon go on to be Santana's drummer.

The title track was chosen by famed choreographer Lionel Blair for use in a dance sequence that was part of a 1976 episode of the television series Space: 1999 titled "One Moment of Humanity". A pared-down, instrumental version of the song was specially recorded for the episode by series composer Derek Wadsworth. Storm at Sunup and Love Me Now were covered by Buddy Rich on his album Speak No Evil.

== Track listing ==
All tracks are written by Gino Vannelli.

Side A
No.	Title	Length
1.	"Storm at Sunup"	6:37
2.	"Love Me Now"	3:44
3.	"Mama Coco"	3:06
4.	"Father and Son"	3:13
Total length:		16:40

Side B
No.	Title	Length
1.	"Where Am I Going"	7:47
2.	"Keep On Walking"	3:49
3.	"Love Is a Night"	3:51
4.	"Gettin' High"	3:25
Total length:		18:52

== Personnel ==
=== Production ===
- Produced and Arranged by Gino Vannelli and Joe Vannelli.
- Synthesizer, horn and string arrangements by Gino Vannelli and Richard Baker.
- Engineer – Tommy Vicari
- Assistant Engineer – Ed Thacker
- Mastered by Bernie Grundman at A&M Studios (Hollywood, CA).
- Art Direction – Roland Young
- Design and Photography – Bob Seidemann
- Record label – Ariola Benelux B.V.
- Manufactured by Ariola Eurodisc Benelux B.V.
- Distributed by Ariola Eurodisc Benelux B.V.
- Phonographic Copyright (p) – A&M Records, Inc.

=== Musicians ===
- Gino Vannelli – lead vocals, backing vocals
- Joe Vannelli – acoustic piano, electric piano, synthesizers
- Richard Baker – organ, synthesizers, synth bass
- Jay Graydon – electric guitars
- Graham Lear – drums
- John J. Mandel – percussion
- Sergio Pastora – congas, talking drum
- Don Bailey – harmonica
- Jerome Richardson – tenor saxophone, soprano saxophone
- Ross Vannelli – backing vocals
- Sally Stevens – backing vocals

== Charts ==
Chart (1975)	Peak position
Canada (RPM Magazine)	45
US Billboard 200	66

=== Singles ===
Year	Single	Chart	Position
1975	"Love Me Now"	Canada (RPM magazine)	75
1976	"Keep On Walking"	Canada (RPM magazine)	82
