= I Just Wanna Stop =

1978 single by Gino Vannelli

Single by Gino Vannelli

from the album Brother to Brother
- B-side: "The Surest Things Can Change"
- Released: August 1978
- Recorded: 1978
- Genre: Soft rock; pop
- Length: 3:37
- Label: A&M
- Songwriter: Ross Vannelli
- Producers: Gino Vannelli, Joe Vannelli, Ross Vannelli

Gino Vannelli singles chronology
"Love of My Life" (1976)	"I Just Wanna Stop" (1978)	"Wheels of Life" (1979)

Live video
- "I Just Wanna Stop" (from Live in LA, 2015) Video on YouTube

"I Just Wanna Stop" is a song by Canadian singer/songwriter Gino Vannelli. Released as a single in August 1978, it remains his biggest hit single to date, reaching No. 1 in his native Canada and No. 4 on the U.S. Billboard Hot 100. It appears on his sixth album, Brother to Brother. The recording was produced by Gino and his brothers, Joe and Ross Vannelli; the song was written by Ross. It received a nomination for Grammy Award for Best Male Pop Vocal Performance at the 21st Annual Grammy Awards.

== Track listing ==
UK 7" single
A. "I Just Wanna Stop" - 3:37
B. "The Surest Things Can Change" - 4:35

== Chart performance ==
=== Weekly singles charts ===
Chart (1978–1979)	Peak position
Australia (Kent Music Report)	59
Canada (CRIA)	16
Canada (RPM Top Singles)	1
Canada (RPM Adult Contemporary)	5
New Zealand (Recorded Music NZ)	34
US Billboard Hot 100	4
US Adult Contemporary (Billboard)	4
US Hot Soul Singles (Billboard)	21
US Cash Box Top 100	2

=== Year-end charts ===
Chart (1978)	Rank
Canada RPM Top Singles	37
U.S. Cash Box	50
US Top Pop Singles (Billboard)	75

== Cover versions ==
- R&B/jazz singer Angela Bofill recorded the song as part of her 1988 Capitol release Intuition. This version peaked at No. 11 on the Billboard Hot Black Singles chart.
- Keith Urban recorded a cover for his 2026 album Flow State.
