= Carroll Pratt =

American sound engineer (1921–2010)

- Pratt, 1980s
- Born: Carroll Holmes Pratt; April 19, 1921; Hollywood, California
- Died: November 11, 2010 (aged 89); Santa Rosa, California, U.S.
- Years active: 1947–1995
- Spouse: Carole

Carroll Holmes Pratt (April 19, 1921 – November 11, 2010) was an American sound engineer who, along with laugh track inventor Charley Douglass, pioneered the use of prerecorded laughter.

== Early life ==
Carroll Pratt was born April 19, 1921, in Hollywood, California, to Carroll, Sr., a sound engineer during the early years of sound in films and television, and Edith Pratt (née Holmes), a housewife and homemaker. The Pratt family relocated to Sydney, where Pratt's father worked on Australia's first film with sound, before returning to the U.S. The junior Pratt soon took an interest in sound engineering as well.

After serving in the United States Air Force during World War II, Pratt began working as a sound engineer at MGM Studios.

== Charley Douglass and Northridge Electronics ==
Pratt met Charley Douglass, inventor of the laugh track while at MGM. Pratt regularly helped Douglass transport the bulky "laff box" into studios and was eventually added to the payroll of Northridge Electronics, Douglass's company.

Douglass trained Pratt in his methods of adding laughter to existing soundtracks. Pratt spent his first two years under Douglass' guidance, laughing up the integrated commercials that television programs used to include, in which the actors of the shows would promote the shows' products sponsors; afterwards, Pratt was assigned to laughing entire programs when Northridge Electronics worked on the Screen Gems shows Bachelor Father (CBS, 1957–59; NBC, 1959–61; ABC, 1961–62), Leave it to Beaver (CBS, 1957–58; ABC, 1958–63), and Dennis the Menace (CBS, 1959–63), among others.

Due to a spike in business, Douglass hired Pratt's brother, John, as well. Because different editors would react to certain jokes and situations in different ways, producers would put in bids for specific editors to laugh their shows; next to Douglass, the Pratt brothers were the most prolific editors working for Northridge Electronics.

== Formation of Sound One ==
In addition to regular laugh track editing, the Pratt brothers worked in Douglass' workshop during summer hiatuses, building and rebuilding machines. "Charley was a great machinist", Carroll commented, "we were sort of the nuts-and-bolts guys."

Carroll and John worked faithfully and devotedly for Douglass, whose technology had become outdated by the mid-1970s. Pratt commented that after years of constant use, Douglass' tapes were beginning to wear out; as a result, hissing sounds were audible, and they knew a laugh was about to be heard by the increase of hissing.

Despite efforts to convince Douglass to advance his technology, Douglass himself, while not stubborn, was quite fond of his invention and felt no urge to advance. Pratt constructed a new computerized "laff box"; the innovative new machine was smaller, simpler to use, and could store recordings on cassette tapes, as opposed to Douglass' 32 magnetic tape loops.

The Pratt brothers parted ways with Douglass in 1977, and formed a new company, Sound One. The new company had an immediate edge over Douglass offering stereo recordings that matched the sound quality of stereo programs. Douglass tried to convert previous mono analog recordings to stereo, with mediocre results.

Producers were enthused by the ingenuity of Pratt's laugh track, that by 1978, most producers shifted from Douglass' track to Pratt's track for both using and sweetening.

== Later years ==
While Douglass' laugh track had been boisterous and hearty, Pratt's laugh track was more subtle and subdued, reflecting a shift in the mindset of viewing audiences. Pratt commented, "A joke is a joke, but I've noticed that the public is more sophisticated now. They don't seem to be hand-fed as they were in the early days. Now, we take the light approach as far as trying to drive home a joke with audience reaction. I think that it's okay to back off a little bit especially on a live-audience show. Go with the show and let them tell you."

Pratt carried on the audience reaction legacy pioneered by Douglass on not only sitcoms, but live programs such as award shows, game shows, sports programs, specials and pageants. Much like his mentor's company, Sound One was a mostly family business; John continued working with Carroll until 1980, while his wife, Carole, served as the company's accountant.

Like Douglass, Pratt also hired additional editors, mentoring and training them on laugh machines, and how to edit laugh tracks on programs. Pratt overheard the writers whispering to one another, "Isn't he too old to understand today's humor?", which made him realize that writers and producers were getting steadily younger, and as such, the production industry as a whole was also in the hands of younger professionals; because of this, Pratt decided that it was time for him to turn Sound One over to the hands of his younger proteges. Pratt officially retired from managing Sound One in 1989, but continued to consult with other editors, and occasionally laugh up programs until 1995.

== Death ==
Pratt died of natural causes on November 11, 2010, in Santa Rosa, California at age 89.

== Personal life ==
While Pratt was working on M*A*S*H, a woman wrote in to producer Gene Reynolds, begging him to stop using a laugh track on the show. Ironically, the woman was Pratt's girlfriend, Carole. The two later married and lived in Malibu, California.

== Filmography ==
Below is a partial list of shows Pratt worked on, both while working for Douglass, for his own Sound One. Years indicate the time period Northridge Electronics and/or Sound One worked on the corresponding show.

=== Northridge Electronics ===
- I Love Lucy (CBS, 1951–57)
- The Steve Allen Show (NBC, 1956–60; ABC, 1961; Syndication, 1962–64)
- Bachelor Father (CBS, 1957–59; NBC, 1959–61; ABC, 1961–62)
- Leave it to Beaver (CBS, 1957–58; ABC, 1958–63)
- Kraft Music Hall (NBC, 1958–71)
- Dennis the Menace (CBS, 1959–63)
- My Three Sons (ABC, 1960–65; CBS, 1965–72)
- The Flintstones (ABC, 1960–66)
- The Andy Griffith Show (CBS, 1960–68) (previously laughed by Douglass)
- The Dick Van Dyke Show (CBS, 1961–66)
- The Jetsons (ABC, 1962–63)
- The Beverly Hillbillies (CBS, 1962–71)
- My Favorite Martian (CBS, 1963–65)
- Bewitched (ABC, 1964–72)
- Green Acres (CBS, 1965–71)
- Hogan's Heroes (CBS, 1965–71)
- I Dream of Jeannie (NBC, 1965–70)
- The Carol Burnett Show (CBS, 1967–1978) (Writers Guild strike specials only)
- The Smothers Brothers Comedy Hour (CBS, 1967–69)
- The Banana Splits Adventure Hour (NBC, 1968–70)
- Scooby Doo, Where Are You! (CBS, 1969–71)
- The Brady Bunch (ABC, 1969–74) (only when Douglass was unavailable)
- The Mary Tyler Moore Show (CBS, 1970–77)
- Josie and the Pussycats (CBS, 1970–71)
- The Odd Couple (ABC, 1970–75)
- The Partridge Family (ABC, 1970–74)
- The Sonny & Cher Comedy Hour (CBS, 1971–74)

=== Transition from Northridge Electronics to Sound One ===
- The Pink Panther Show (Northridge Electronics, 1969–78; Sound One, 1978–80)
- The Bob Newhart Show (CBS, 1972–78)
- M*A*S*H (Northridge Electronics, 1972–77; Sound One, 1977–83)
- Happy Days (Northridge Electronics, 1974–77; Sound One, 1977–84)
- Rhoda (CBS, 1974–78)
- The Jeffersons (CBS, 1975–85)
- Barney Miller (ABC, 1975–82)
- Laverne & Shirley (ABC, 1976–1983)
- Alice (Northridge Electronics, 1976–1978; Sound One, 1978–85)
- Eight Is Enough (Northridge Electronics, 1977–79; Sound One, 1980–81)
- The Love Boat (Northridge Electronics, 1977–78; Sound One, 1979–86)

=== Sound One ===
- What's Happening!! (ABC, 1976–79)
- Halloween with the New Addams Family (NBC, 1977)
- Soap (Northridge Electronics, 1977–1978; Sound One, 1978–81)
- Taxi (ABC, 1978–82; NBC, 1982–83) [also collaborated with Douglass on many episodes]
- WKRP in Cincinnati (CBS, 1978–82)
- Mork & Mindy (ABC, 1978–82)
- Benson (ABC, 1979–86)
- You Can't Do That on Television (1979–82) [not for entire run]
- Harper Valley PTA (NBC, 1981–82)
- The Great Space Coaster (syndicated, 1981–86)
- Family Ties (NBC, 1982–89)
- Newhart (CBS, 1982–90)
- The New Odd Couple (ABC, 1982–83)
- AfterMASH (CBS, 1983–85)
- W*A*L*T*E*R (CBS, 1983)
- Kate & Allie (CBS, 1984–89)
- The Cosby Show (NBC, 1984–92)
- Who's the Boss (ABC, 1984–92)
- Mama's Family (NBC, 1983–84; syndicated, 1986–90)
- ALF (NBC, 1986–90)
- Married... with Children (FOX, 1987–97)
- Roseanne (ABC, 1988–97)
- Seinfeld (NBC, 1989–98)
- Home Improvement (ABC, 1991–99)
- The Red Green Show (CBC Television, 1991–2006) [not for entire run]
- Mad About You (NBC, 1992–99)
- Friends (NBC, 1994–2004)
- Kenan and Kel (Nickelodeon, 1996–2000) [not for entire run]

== See also ==
- Laugh track
- Charles Douglass
