= Christian Schrader =

American sound engineer

- Occupation: Sound engineer

Christian Schrader is an American sound engineer. He won six Primetime Emmy Awards and was nominated for twenty-seven more in the Outstanding Sound Mixing categories.
