= Powerful People =

Studio album by Gino Vannelli
- Released: September 1974
- Studio: A&M (Hollywood, California)
- Genre: Soft rock, jazz fusion, art rock, pop rock
- Length: 32:48
- Label: A&M
- Producer: Gino Vannelli; Joe Vannelli; Herb Alpert (associate producer)

Gino Vannelli chronology
| Crazy Life (1973) | Powerful People (1974) | Storm at Sunup (1975) |

Professional ratings
Review scores
| Source | Rating |
|---|---|
| Allmusic | 3/5 stars |
| Rolling Stone Album Guide (1992) | 1.0/5 stars |

Powerful People is the second studio album of Canadian singer Gino Vannelli. The album was released in 1974, and was produced by Gino and his brother Joe Vannelli. Herb Alpert (who produced Vannelli's first album) is credited as associate producer, and Alpert's future wife, Lani Hall, sang background vocals.

After his debut Crazy Life had failed to chart due to poor record company promotion, Vannelli assembled a band to record his second album. He and brother Joe had played all the instruments on Crazy Life, but Powerful People is characterized by Joe Vannelli's first experiments with synthesizers and the use of session musicians.

The funky "People Gotta Move" was Vannelli's first hit in the United States, when disco music was gaining popularity. The song reached #22 on Billboard Hot 100 and #21 in Canada. "Powerful People" reached #34 in Canada. The last track, "Poor Happy Jimmy", is a tribute to American singer Jim Croce, who died in an airplane accident a year earlier. The album was on the Canadian charts four separate times totalling 28 weeks between November 16, 1974, and August 14, 1976.

== Track listing ==
All tracks are written by Gino Vannelli. All arrangements by Joe Vannelli and Richard Baker.

Side one
| No. | Title | Length |
|---|---|---|
| 1. | "People Gotta Move" | 3:21 |
| 2. | "Lady" | 3:43 |
| 3. | "Son of a New York Gun" | 3:23 |
| 4. | "Jack Miraculous" | 2:42 |
| 5. | "Jo Jo" | 3:40 |
| Total length: | | 16:49 |

Side two
| No. | Title | Length |
|---|---|---|
| 1. | "Powerful People" | 6:12 |
| 2. | "Felicia" | 3:04 |
| 3. | "The Work Verse" | 2:54 |
| 4. | "Poor Happy Jimmy" | 3:49 |
| Total length: | | 15:59 |

== Charts ==
| Chart (1974) | Position |
|---|---|
| Australia (Kent Music Report) | 54 |
| Canada (RPM) | 60 |
| United States (Billboard 200) | 60 |

== Personnel ==
=== Production ===
- Gino Vannelli – producer, arrangements
- Joe Vannelli – producer, arrangements
- Herb Alpert – associate producer
- Tommy Vicari – engineer
- Larry Forkner – engineer
- Bernie Grundman – mastering
- Roland Young – art direction
- Junie Osaki – design
- Jim McCrary – back cover photography
- John Rideout – front cover photography

=== Musicians ===
- Gino Vannelli – lead vocals, backing vocals
- Joe Vannelli – electric piano, synthesizers, horn and string arrangements
- Richard Baker – organ, organ bass, synthesizers, horn and string arrangements
- Graham Lear – drums
- John J. Mandel – percussion
- Tony Golia – bongos, congas
- Lani Hall – backing vocals
