= Brian Riordan =

American sound engineer (born 1974)

- Born: Brian Riordan
- Occupations: Re-recording mixer; sound designer; sound engineer
- Instruments: Guitar and piano
- Years active: 1995–present
- Website: levelsaudio.com

Brian Riordan (born 1974) is a four-time Grammy and five-time Emmy-winning re-recording mixer, music mixer, musician, and entrepreneur. He is the founder and CEO of Levels Audio in Hollywood, California.

== Awards ==
Here are the nominations and awards Riordan has won. Wins are bolded.

=== Grammy Awards ===
- **Equanimity & The Bird Revelation (2018) Best Comedy Album: Re-recording mixer**
- **Sticks & Stones (2019) Best Comedy Album: Re-recording mixer**
- **The Closer (2020) Best Comedy Album: Re-recording mixer**
- **The Dreamer (2025) Best Comedy Album: Re-recording mixer**

=== Primetime Emmy Awards ===
Awards and nominations:

- American Idol (2003) Outstanding Sound Mixing For Nonfiction Programming (Single Or Multi-Camera): Re-recording mixer
- 76th Academy Awards (2004) Outstanding Sound Mixing for a Variety Or Music Series Or Special: Re-recording mixer
- American Idol (2005) Outstanding Sound Mixing For Nonfiction Programming (Single Or Multi-camera): Post-sound mixer
- American Idol Finale (2005) Outstanding Sound Mixing For A Variety Or Music Series Or Special Or Animation: Re-recording mixer
- American Idol (2006) Outstanding Sound Mixing For A Variety Or Music Series Or Special Or Animation: Re-recording mixer
- American Idol Finale (2008) Outstanding Sound Mixing For A Variety Or Music Series Or Special: Pre-production packages mixer
- American Idol (2009) Outstanding Sound Mixing For Nonfiction Programming: Re-recording mixer
- **81st Academy Awards (2009) Outstanding Sound Mixing For A Variety Or Music Series Or Special: Pre-production packages mixer**
- American Idol Finale (2009) Outstanding Sound Mixing For A Variety Or Music Series Or Special: Pre-production packages mixer
- Flight of the Conchords (2009) Outstanding Sound Mixing For A Comedy Or Drama Series (Half-Hour) And Animation: Re-recording mixer
- **25th Anniversary Rock and Roll Hall of Fame Concert (2010) Outstanding Sound Mixing for a Variety or Music Series or Special: Re-recording mixer**
- American Idol (2010) Outstanding Sound Mixing for a Variety or Music Series or Special: Re-recording mixer
- American Idol Finale (2010) Outstanding Sound Mixing for a Variety or Music Series or Special: Re-recording mixer
- 82nd Academy Awards (2010) Outstanding Sound Mixing for a Variety or Music Series or Special: Re-recording mixer
- American Idol (2011) Outstanding Sound Mixing for a Variety or Music Series or Special: Re-recording mixer
- **84th Academy Awards (2012) Outstanding Sound Mixing for a Variety or Music Series or Special: Re-recording mixer**
- American Idol (2012) Outstanding Sound Mixing for a Variety or Music Series or Special: Re-recording mixer
- American Idol (2013) Outstanding Sound Mixing for a Variety or Music Series or Special: Re-recording mixer
- The Voice (2015) Outstanding Sound Mixing for a Variety Series or Special: Re-recording mixer
- The Voice (2016) Outstanding Sound Mixing for a Variety Series or Special: Re-recording mixer
- The Voice (2017) Outstanding Sound Mixing for a Variety Series or Special: Re-recording mixer
- Dave Chappelle: Sticks and Stones (2020) Outstanding Sound Mixing for a Variety Series or Special: Re-recording mixer
- **Billy Joel: The 100th - Madison Square Garden (2024) Outstanding Sound Mixing For A Variety Series Or Special: Re-recording mixer**

=== Daytime Emmy Awards ===
- Disney Parks Christmas Day Parade (2012) Outstanding Live and Direct to Tape Sound Mixing: Post-production mixer
- **Disney Parks Christmas Day Parade (2013) Outstanding Live and Direct to Tape Sound Mixing: Post-production mixer**

=== Cinema Audio Society Awards ===
- American Idol: Season 7 Finale (2009) Outstanding Achievement in Sound Mixing for 2008: Television Non-Fiction, Variety or Music Series or Special: Re-recording mixer
- Lady Gaga Monster Ball Tour (2011) Outstanding Achievement in Sound Mixing for Television Non-Fiction, Variety or Music Series or Specials: Re-recording mixer
- **2012 Rock and Roll Hall of Fame Induction Ceremony (2012) Outstanding Achievement in Sound Mixing for Television Non-Fiction, Variety or Music Series or Specials: Re-recording mixer**
- They'll Love Me When I'm Dead (2019) Outstanding Achievement in Sound Mixing for Motion Picture Documentary: Re-recording mixer

=== TEC Awards ===
- Outstanding Creative Achievement in Television Sound Production (2006) American Idol
- Outstanding Creative Achievement in Television Sound Production (2007) American Idol
- Outstanding Creative Achievement in Studio Design (2007) Levels Audio
- Outstanding Creative Achievement in Television Sound Production (2009) American Idol
- Outstanding Creative Achievement in Television Sound Production (2011) American Idol
- Outstanding Creative Achievement in Television Sound Production (2012) American Idol
- Studio Design Project for Mix 8 and 9 (2018) Levels Audio

=== Gopo Awards ===
- **The The Rest Is Silence (2009) Best Sound in a Film**
