= Ron Reaves =

American audio engineer

Ron Reaves is an American audio engineer best known as the Front of House mixer for the Grammy Award ceremonies, which he has been doing the FOH since the early 2000s. He is also a regular FOH engineer for events at the East Room of the White House.

Reaves, a guitar player himself, spoke with love and respect ("you don't tell The Edge to turn down his echo") for the musicians he mixes in a 2013 interview in Guitar Player: "I mix music for free. It's all the other s**t that I charge for."
