= Crazy Life (Gino Vannelli album) =

Studio album by Gino Vannelli
- Released: October 1973
- Recorded: February–April 1973
- Studios: A&M (Hollywood, California)
- Genres: Bossa nova Soft rock Contemporary pop/rock
- Length: 23:43
- Label: A&M
- Producer: Herb Alpert

Gino Vannelli chronology
Crazy Life (1973)	Powerful People (1974)

Professional ratings
Review scores
Source	Rating
Rolling Stone Album Guide (1992)	0.5/5 stars

Crazy Life, originally released in 1973 by A&M Records, is the debut album by Canadian singer and songwriter Gino Vannelli.

Six years before Crazy Life came out, Vannelli had gained a recording contract with RCA Canada under the name Vann-Elli because his real name was viewed "too Italian". However, Vann-Elli would release only one single under that moniker, 1970's "Gina Bold", before being dropped (#92CAN). With brothers Joe and Ross, Vannelli traveled to New York, back to Montreal, and again to Los Angeles where he was discovered by producer Herb Alpert and gave him a demo tape. Alpert signed Vannelli on the condition he produce the singer's first album, which Vannelli agreed to.

Before signing with A&M, Vannelli had written several albums' worth of songs, including most of the material on Powerful People and Storm at Sunup – indeed the title track was the only song from Vannelli's Alpert demo to appear on Crazy Life.

Even before its release, Crazy Life gained some airplay on stations in the Vannellis' home city of Montreal, but A&M's support was poor and this meant Crazy Life did not chart in either the US or Canada. The title track has appeared on many later compilations like The Best of Gino Vannelli.

== Track listing ==
All tracks are written by Gino Vannelli, arranged by Gino Vannelli and Joe Vannelli.

Side one
No.	Title	Length
1.	"Crazy Life"	2:51
2.	"Hollywood Holiday"	2:57
3.	"There's No Time"	2:56
4.	"Fling of Mine"	2:20
5.	"Granny Goodbye"	2:21
Total length:		13:25

Side two
No.	Title	Length
1.	"Great Lake Canoe"	2:52
2.	"Cherizar"	3:05
3.	"One Woman Lover"	2:26
4.	"Piano Song"	1:55
Total length:		10:18
