= Gino Vannelli =

Canadian singer, songwriter and musician (born 1952)

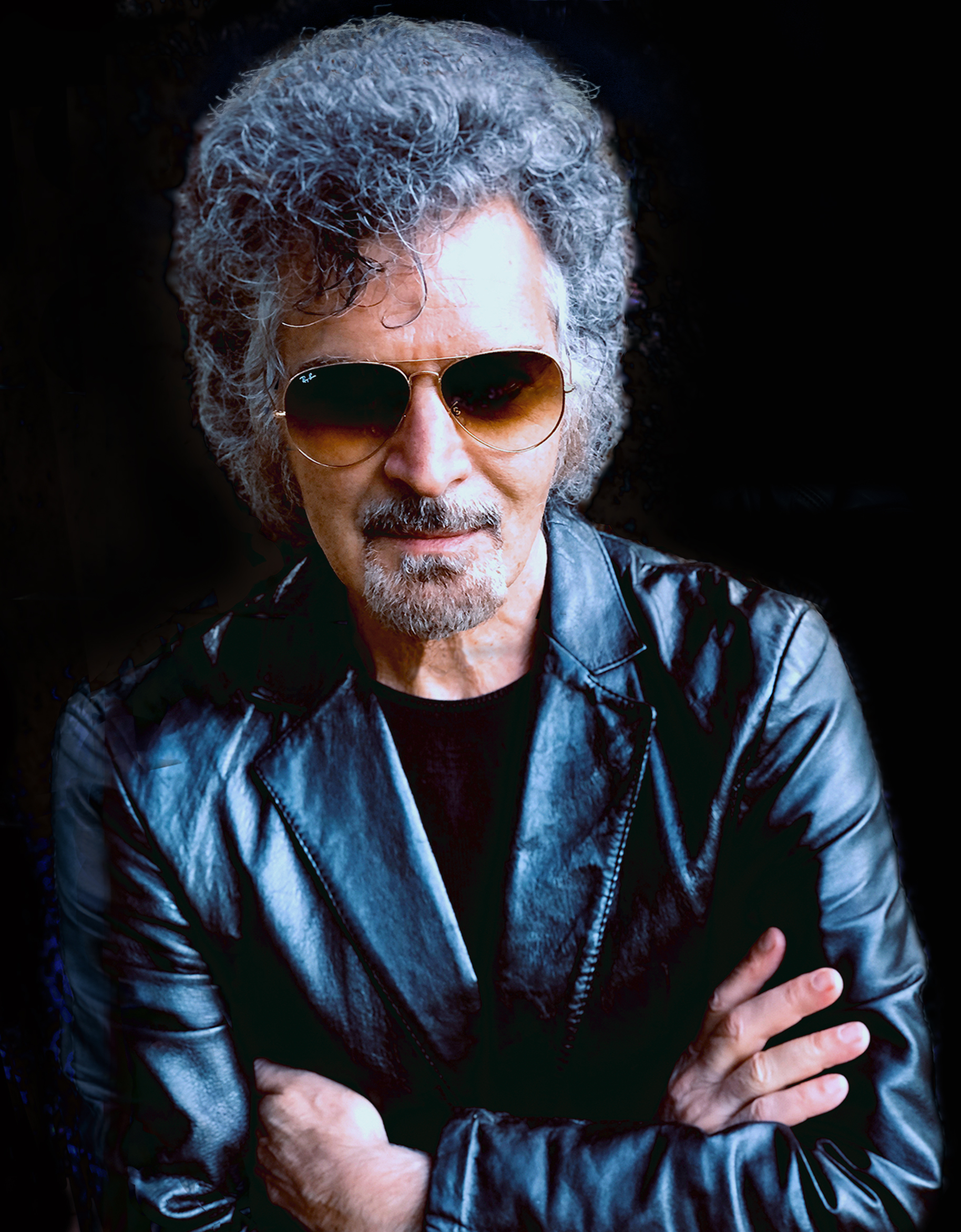
- Vannelli c. 2020s

Background information
- Born: June 16, 1952 (age 74); Montreal, Quebec, Canada
- Genres: Pop; rock; soft rock
- Occupations: Singer; songwriter; musician
- Instruments: Vocals; guitar; piano
- Years active: 1969–present
- Labels: A&M; Arista; Dreyfus; Sony
- Website: www.ginov.com

Gino Vannelli (born June 16, 1952) is a Canadian rock/jazz/fusion/pop vocalist, producer, performer and songwriter He produced several commercially successful songs in the 1970s and 1980s. His best-known singles include "People Gotta Move" (1974), "I Just Wanna Stop" (1978), "Living Inside Myself" (1981) and "Wild Horses" (1987).

== Career ==
Vannelli was born to an Italian family in Montreal, Quebec. His father, (Joseph) Russ Vannelli, sang with the Montreal dance bands of trumpeters Bix Belair and Maynard Ferguson. His early ambition was to be a drummer. He admired Gene Krupa and Buddy Rich, and he played drums in a pop band while he was in high school. In 1969, at the age of seventeen, he signed a contract with RCA Records, using the name Vann-Elli. He studied music theory at McGill University in Montreal. Buddy Rich later covered Vannelli's songs "Storm At Sunup" and "Love Me Now" on his album Speak No Evil.

Vannelli and his brother, Joe, moved to Los Angeles in 1972. Desperate and broke, they waited for hours in the parking lot outside A&M Studios, hoping to get a record deal. When Herb Alpert, the co-owner of A&M Records, finally emerged, Vannelli ran toward him and gave him a demo tape while being chased by security guards. Alpert signed Vannelli and released his debut album, Crazy Life, in the summer of 1973.

Vannelli was one of the first white artists (Dennis Coffey being the very first in January 1972) to appear on the television dance program Soul Train. In 1974, he was invited to tour with Stevie Wonder. That same year, he released his second album, Powerful People, which contained his first major hit, “People Gotta Move”.

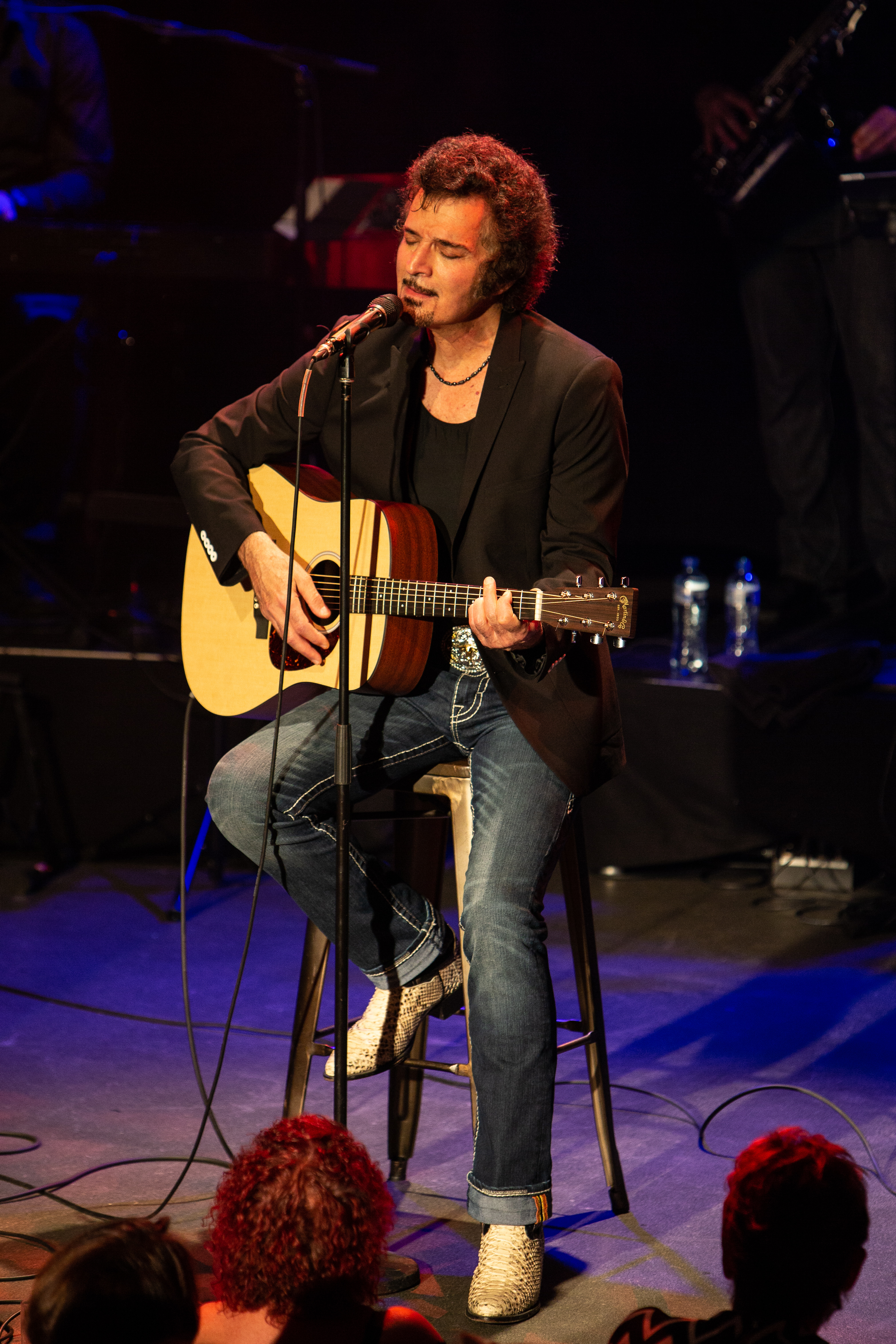
Vannelli live, Hilversum, De Vorstin (2018)

Vannelli released an album, The Gist of the Gemini, in 1976 through A&M Records.

Pauper in Paradise (A&M 1977) was an ambitious cocktail of prog rock fusion, jazz and symphonic sounds. The complex album featured the London Philharmonic Symphony and explored themes of war and love.

His 1978 album Brother to Brother, also with A&M, produced the single "I Just Wanna Stop", which reached No. 4 on the Billboard magazine chart, No. 1 in Canada, and received a Grammy Award nomination. His next album, Nightwalker, also produced a top ten hit, "Living Inside Myself".

He received the Juno Award for Most Promising Male Vocalist in 1975. In 1976, and in 1979, he received the Juno Award for Best Male Vocalist. He and his brother Joe, his musical partner during those years, shared the Juno Award for Best Production for Brother to Brother in 1979.

Despite the success of singles "Black Cars" and "Hurts to Be in Love" (1985), from his album Black Cars, as well as "Wild Horses" (1987) from the album Big Dreamers Never Sleep, Vannelli only appeared live sporadically throughout the 1980s. He has described himself as going on a spiritual journey during this time.

Departing from the jazz-pop idiom, Vannelli released two mostly acoustic jazz discs, Yonder Tree (1995) and Slow Love (1997). After producing the album Hitek Hiku for Danish jazz pianist Niels Lan Doky, Vannelli revisited his interest in western classical music with the song "Parole Per Mio Padre" (Words For My Father), dedicated to his late father, and composed in the style and tradition of Schubert. The recording came to the attention of Pope John Paul II who requested a performance of the song at the Vatican. Televised in Europe, the event caught the attention of the head of BMG Records who subsequently asked Vannelli to record a contemporary classical disc in the style of "Parole per Mio Padre". Canto, released by BMG in 2003, features songs sung in English, Italian, Spanish, and French, and is considered by fans and Vannelli himself to be one of his strongest musical accomplishments. In 2008, Vannelli became a symbol of sorts for the National Basketball Association championship run by the Boston Celtics. After each blowout home victory during the 2008 season, the video crew at the TD Banknorth Garden played a clip from Dick Clark's American Bandstand that featured a bearded disco dancer clad in a tight Gino Vannelli T-shirt. The tradition became known in Boston as "Gino Time" and Gino T-shirts became common at Celtics games. The Wall Street Journal reported in 2008 that the dancer in the Vannelli shirt was a young man named Joseph R. Massoni, and that he had died of pneumonia in 1990. He was 34 years old.

"People Gotta Move" became a small hit again in the Netherlands in 2008 after this song was used in a commercial on TV and radio of the ANWB (Dutch road assistance).

On May 13, 2014, Vannelli's Live in L.A. CD/DVD compilation was released by the Sono Recording Group. The presentation was recorded live onstage at the historic Saban Theater in Los Angeles on November 8, 2013, which represented Vannelli's first performance in Los Angeles in more than 15 years. The recording also marks the first on-stage collaboration in many years between the three Vannelli brothers (including Ross Vannelli as producer, editor, and mixer).

Vannelli resides in Troutdale, Oregon, where he is active as a music teacher. He continues to perform throughout North America and Europe.

== Awards and honors ==
- Grammy Award nomination, "I Just Wanna Stop", 1978
- Juno Award, Best Male Artist, 1976, 1979
- Juno Award, Recording Engineer of the Year, with Joe Vannelli, 1986, 1987, 1991
- "Wild Horses", 1987, Best Video, Best Song

== Discography ==
=== Albums ===
Title	Album details	Peak chart positions								Certifications
Title	Album details	CAN	AUS	FIN	GER	ITA	NED	SWE	US	Certifications
Crazy Life	Released: 1973; Label: A&M	—	—	—	—	—	—	—	—	
Powerful People	Released: 1974; Label: A&M	60	54	—	—	—	11	—	60	CAN: Gold
Storm at Sunup	Released: 1975; Label: A&M	45	—	—	—	—	—	—	66	CAN: Gold
The Gist of the Gemini	Released: 1976; Label: A&M	14	—	—	—	—	4	—	32	CAN: Gold
A Pauper in Paradise	Released: 1977; Label: A&M	29	—	—	—	—	—	—	33	
Brother to Brother	Released: 1978; Label: A&M	3	78	—	—	—	43	—	13	CAN: Platinum; US: Platinum
The Best of Gino Vannelli	Released: 1980; Label: A&M	—	—	—	—	—	—	—	172	
Nightwalker	Released: 1981; Label: Arista	18	—	—	—	—	—	20	15	CAN: Gold
Black Cars	Released: 1984; Label: Polydor	17	—	—	—	—	27	29	62	CAN: Platinum
Big Dreamers Never Sleep	Released: 1987; Label: Polydor	18	31	40	62	15	31	11	160	CAN: Gold
Inconsolable Man	Released: 1990; Label: Polydor	62	—	—	—	—	76	—	—	
Live in Montreal	Released: 1991; Label: Vie	—	—	—	—	—	69	—	—	
Yonder Tree	Released: 1995; Label: Mercury	—	—	—	—	—	—	—	—	
Slow Love	Released: 1998; Label: Mercury	—	—	—	—	—	—	—	—	
The North Sea Jazz festival 2002	Released: 2002; Label: BMG	—	—	—	—	—	—	—	—	& the Metropole Orchestra, Live album
Canto	Released: 2003; Label: BMG	—	—	—	—	—	—	—	—	
These Are the Days	Released: 2006; Label: Hip-O	—	—	—	—	—	93	—	—	
A Good Thing	Released: 2009; Label: CMM	—	—	—	—	—	33	—	—	
Stardust in the Sand	Released: 2009; Label: ZYX Music	—	—	—	—	—	—	—	—	A book including CD
Live in LA	Released: 2015; Label: SoNo Recording Group	—	—	—	—	—	—	—	—	
Wilderness Road	Released: 2019; Label: SoNo Recording Group	—	—	—	—	—	—	—	—	
The Life I Got (To My Most Beloved)	Released: 2025; Label: Bed / The Orchard	—	—	—	—	—	—	—	—	
"—" denotes items that did not chart or were not released in that territory.

=== Singles ===
Year	Single	Peak chart positions										Album
Year	Single	CAN	CAN AC	AUS	BEL (FL)	GER	NL	NZ	US	US AC	US R&B	Album
1970	"Gina Bold" (Vann-Elli)	92	—	—	—	—	—	—	—	—	—	Non-album single
1970	"Never Cry Again" (Vann-Elli)	—	—	—	—	—	—	—	—	—	—	Non-album single
1974	"People Gotta Move"	21	—	64	—	—	—	—	22	17	—	Powerful People
1975	"Powerful People"	34	—	—	—	—	—	—	—	—	—	Powerful People
1975	"Love Me Now"	75	—	—	—	—	—	—	—	—	—	Storm at Sunup
1976	"Keep On Walking"	82	—	—	—	—	—	—	—	—	—	Storm at Sunup
1976	"Love of My Life"	55	—	—	—	—	—	—	64	—	—	The Gist of the Gemini
1978	"I Just Wanna Stop"	1	5	59	—	—	—	34	4	4	21	Brother to Brother
1979	"Wheels of Life"	31	14	—	—	—	—	—	78	24	91	Brother to Brother
1979	"The River Must Flow"	80	—	—	—	—	—	—	—	—	—	Brother to Brother
1981	"Living Inside Myself"	13	2	86	—	—	—	—	6	5	45	Nightwalker
1981	"Nightwalker"	—	—	—	—	—	—	—	41	—	—	Nightwalker
1982	"The Longer You Wait"	—	—	—	—	—	—	—	89	—	—	Twisted Heart
1985	"Black Cars"	4	—	—	29	—	—	—	42	—	—	Black Cars
1985	"Hurts to Be in Love"	19	—	—	5	—	9	—	57	6	—	Black Cars
1985	"Just a Motion Away"	79	—	—	—	—	—	—	—	—	—	Black Cars
1987	"Wild Horses"	7	—	9	13	30	14	—	55	33	—	Big Dreamers Never Sleep
1987	"In the Name of Money"	29	—	—	—	—	—	—	—	—	—	Big Dreamers Never Sleep
1987	"Persona Non Grata"	—	—	—	—	—	44	—	—	—	—	Big Dreamers Never Sleep
1990	"The Time of Day"	10	—	—	—	—	44	—	—	—	—	Inconsolable Man
1991	"Cry of Love"	41	—	—	—	—	—	—	—	—	—	Inconsolable Man
1991	"If I Should Lose This Love"	46	—	—	—	—	—	—	—	49	—	Inconsolable Man
1993	"L'amour est loi (Wheels of Life)" (with Martine St. Clair)	—	—	—	—	—	—	—	—	—	—	Un souffle de tendresse
1995	"I Die a Little More Each Day"	60	—	—	—	—	—	—	—	—	—	Yonder Tree
2006	"It's Only Love"	—	—	—	—	—	—	—	—	—	—	These Are the Days
"—" denotes items that did not chart or were not released in that territory.
