= Mike Miller (guitarist) =

American jazz musician (1953–2025)

- Born: May 8, 1953; Sioux Falls, South Dakota, U.S.
- Died: January 18, 2025 (aged 71)
- Genres: Rock, jazz
- Instruments: Guitar

Mike Miller (May 8, 1953 – January 18, 2025) was an American rock and jazz guitarist. He worked with Bette Midler, Boz Scaggs, Chick Corea, Queen Latifah, Yellowjackets, Brand X, Burton Cummings, Vinnie Colaiuta, Quincy Jones, Gino Vannelli, and Vital Information.

== Background ==
Miller was born into a musical family in Sioux Falls, South Dakota. He was the third of four bass-playing brothers, performing with his father's jazz band at the age of twelve and in garage bands in his teens. He played bass in the Sioux Falls Symphony.

Miller died of a heart attack on January 18, 2025, at the age of 71.

== Career ==
In 1972, Miller moved to Colorado, where he played with Larry Coryell, Robben Ford, Bill Frisell, Bruce Fowler, Tom Fowler, and Steve Fowler. He recorded the album Fly On with the band Air Pocket. He moved to Los Angeles in 1975. In California, he worked with Max Bennett, Brand X, Bobby Caldwell, Alphonso Johnson, Bennie Maupin, Airto Moreira, Shawn Phillips, and Tom Scott.

In 1981, Miller began eleven years of working with pop singer Gino Vannelli, touring and recording five albums. In 1983 he wrote "Elamar" for the Yellowjackets album Mirage a Trois. Three years later he started a trio called The Outsidemen, releasing the live album Band Overboard (1996) In 1993, Miller joined Chick Corea for the album Elektric Band II: Paint the World (1993).

In 1990s Miller performed the music of Frank Zappa as a member of Banned from Utopia with the Seattle Symphony, the Portland Symphony, and the Israel Philharmonic Orchestra. With the Royal Philharmonic Orchestra he recorded a guitar concerto by Joseph Curiale and with the Los Angeles Philharmonic New Music Group he was a soloist alongside Peter Erskine for the album Blood on the Floor by Mark-Anthony Turnage.

At the end of the 1990s, he was involved in scoring Jessica Yu's documentaries Breathing Lessons and The Living Museum. He toured with Bette Midler and appeared on her album Bette. He also worked with film composer Mark Mothersbaugh on The Adventures of Rocky and Bullwinkle (2000) and The Royal Tenenbaums (2001). Marsis Jazz released his first solo album, Save the Moon, in 2001.

He was a touring guitarist with Boz Scaggs from 2014 until his death and has worked with Brandon Fields, Mitchel Forman, Scott Kinsey, Otmaro Ruíz, and Queen Latifah.

In the early-2000s, Miller played custom-made instruments, some with Seymour Duncan pickups, as well as a Martin D-28. He used effects made by Danish company Emma and by Line 6.
