= Joe Vannelli =

Canadian musician (born 1950)

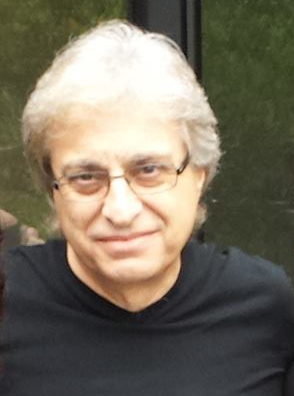
- Vannelli in 2023

Background information
- Born: 28 December 1950 (age 75); Montreal, Quebec, Canada
- Genres: Pop rock, soft rock, jazz, blue-eyed soul, funk
- Occupation: Musician
- Instrument: Keyboards
- Years active: 1973–present

Joe Vannelli (born 28 December 1950) is a Canadian musician, composer and record producer. He is credited on most records of his brother, Gino Vannelli, and in collaboration with youngest brother Ross Vannelli, the three have won many awards.

Vannelli studied music theory in Montreal, and learned to play piano. He was influenced by artists like Bill Evans, Oscar Peterson, Dave Brubeck and Erroll Garner. During the seventies he developed an interest in electronic instruments; he was one of the early synthesizer players. He contributed to most of Gino's albums as a composer, producer, arranger, programmer and engineer.

Apart from his work with Gino and Ross, he has been credited by many artists like Chaka Khan, Eartha Kitt, Gary Morris, David Meece, Kudasai, Marilyn Scott, Jimmy Haslip, REO Speedwagon, Brenda Russell, Pat Thomi, Don Sebesky, Kit Chan, Bill Meyers, Gianni Bella, Glenn Jones and Tower of Power.

== Musical career ==
Gino and Joe moved to Los Angeles in 1972. Desperate and broke, they waited for hours in the parking lot outside A&M Studios, hoping to get a record deal. When Herb Alpert, the co-owner of A&M Records, finally emerged, Vannelli ran towards him and gave him a demo tape while being chased by security guards. Alpert signed Vannelli and released his debut album, Crazy Life, in the summer of 1973.

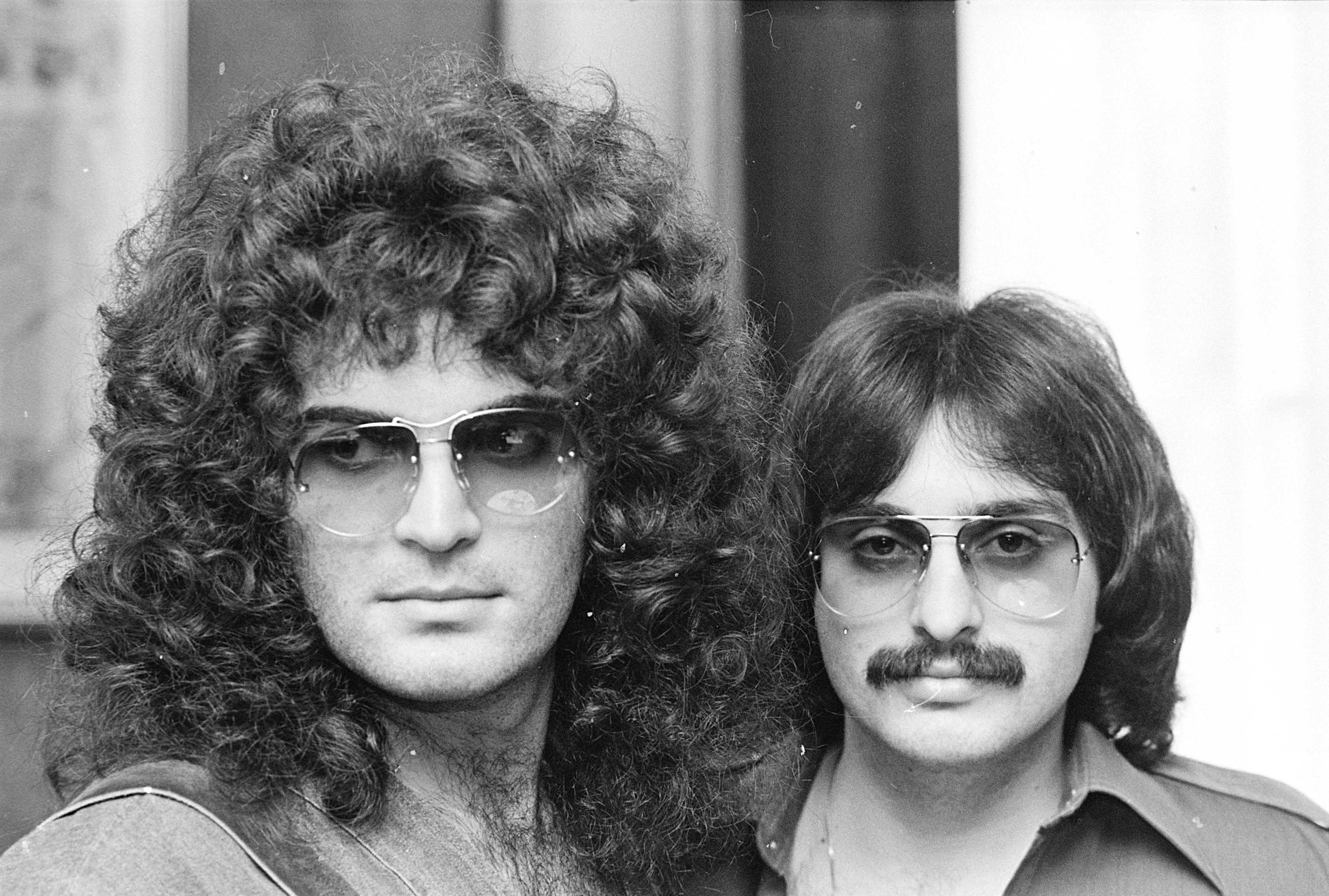
Gino and Joe Vannelli in Amsterdam, 1977

For most of Gino's career, Joe was his keyboard player and arranger. In the early 70's Joe would overdub most of the multiple keyboard parts. This was a time when polyphonic synthesizers weren't around.

Along with Gino, he co-produced the 1986 Chronology album for David Meece which was released on Myrrh Records and co wrote "Seventy Times Seven" and "Come That Day". Vannelli and Burton Cummings co-produced Cummings's 2008 album Above the Ground which was the first album release for Cummings in approximately 18 years.

In 2007 he co-produced Find Your Own Way Home for REO Speedwagon.

In 2009 he produced Not So Silent Night...Christmas with REO Speedwagon for REO Speedwagon.

Vannelli has won six Juno Awards and was nominated for several Grammy Awards, including one for best arrangement. One Juno award was for Recording Engineer of the Year. This was shared with his other brother Ross for "Black Cars" that appeared on Gino Vannelli's album of the same name. The following year more awards came for "Wild Horses" and "Young Lover".

Today, Vannelli has a studio in Agoura Hills, California called Blue Moon Studios.

== Selected discography ==
As Producer

With Tower of Power

• It's Christmas (2023), Tower of Power Records

• It's Christmas, 7" Single (2023), Tower of Power Records

• Tower of Power 50 Years of Funk & Soul: Live at the Fox Theater (2021), Mack Avenue Music Group

• Step Up (2020), Mack Avenue Music Group

• Soul Side of Town (2018), Mack Avenue Music Group

=== As sideman ===
With Tower of Power

• It's Christmas (2023), acoustic keyboards, electric piano, synthesizers

With Jimmy Haslip

- Red Heat (2000)
- Nightfall (Vie Records, 2010)

With Alessandro Bertozzi

- Talkin'back (2003)
