= Primetime Emmy Award for Outstanding Production Design for a Variety or Reality Series =

Television award

Primetime Emmy Award for Production Design for a Variety or Reality Series
- Awarded for: Outstanding Production Design for a Variety or Reality Series
- Country: United States
- Presented by: Academy of Television Arts & Sciences
- Currently held by: The Traitors (2026)
- Website: emmys.com

The Primetime Emmy Award for Outstanding Production Design for a Variety or Reality Series is awarded to one television series each year. Prior to 2016, specials and series competed together. Outstanding Production Design for a Variety Special now separately recognizes specials.

In the following list, the first titles listed in gold are the winners; those not in gold are nominees, which are listed in alphabetical order. The years given are those in which the ceremonies took place.

== Winners and nominations ==
indicates the winner

=== 1970s ===
Outstanding Art Direction for a Single Episode of a Comedy-Variety or Music Series or a Comedy-Variety or Music Special

Year	Program	Episode(s)	Nominees	Network
1970 (22nd)
1970 (22nd)	Mitzi's 2nd Special		E. Jay Krause	NBC
1970 (22nd)	The Carol Burnett Show		Paul Barnes, Bill Harp, Bob Sansom	CBS
1970 (22nd)	The Glen Campbell Goodtime Hour		Robert Checchi, Rene Lagler	CBS
1971 (23rd)
1971 (23rd)	Robert Young and the Family		James Trittipo, George Gaines	CBS
1971 (23rd)	The Flip Wilson Show		Romain Johnston	NBC
1971 (23rd)	The Glen Campbell Goodtime Hour		Robert Checchi, Rene Lagler	CBS
1971 (23rd)	Love Is		Fred Luff	Syndicated
1972 (24th)
1972 (24th)	Diana!		E. Jay Krause	ABC
1972 (24th)	The Carol Burnett Show		Paul Barnes, Bill Harp, Bob Sansom	CBS
1972 (24th)	The Flip Wilson Show		Romain Johnston	NBC
1972 (24th)	The Glen Campbell Show		Robert Checchi, Rene Lagler	CBS
1973 (25th)
1973 (25th)	The Julie Andrews Hour		Brian C. Bartholomew, Keaton S. Walker	ABC
1973 (25th)	The Carol Burnett Show		Paul Barnes, Bill Harp, Bob Sansom	CBS
1973 (25th)	The Flip Wilson Show		Romain Johnston	NBC
1974 (26th)
1974 (26th)	Barbra Streisand...and Other Musical Instruments		Brian C. Bartholomew	CBS
1974 (26th)	The Andy Williams Christmas Show		Lynn Griffin, Rene Lagler	NBC
1974 (26th)	The Carol Burnett Show		Paul Barnes, Bill Harp, Bob Sansom	CBS
1975 (27th)	Outstanding Achievement in Art Direction or Scenic Design — Single Episode of a Comedy-Variety or Music Series or Comedy-Variety or Music Special			
1975 (27th)	Cher	"Bette Midler, Flip Wilson and Elton John"	Robert Checchi, Robert Kelly	CBS
1975 (27th)	An Evening with John Denver		Dwight Jackson, Ken Johnson	ABC
1975 (27th)	Special Classification of Outstanding Program and Individual Achievement (Note: As a juried award, nominees had to garner 50% approval to win the award. The nominee did not meet the benchmark and no award was given.)			
1975 (27th)	Bicentennial Minutes		Jack Stewart, John Hueners	CBS
1976 (28th)
1976 (28th)	Cher	"Anthony Newley and Tina Turner"	Robert Checchi, Raymond Klausen	CBS
1976 (28th)	The Carol Burnett Show	"The Pointer Sisters"	Paul Barnes, Bill Harp, Bob Sansom	CBS
1976 (28th)	John Denver: Rocky Mountain Christmas		Ken Johnson	ABC
1976 (28th)	Mary's Incredible Dream		Eugene McAvoy	CBS

Outstanding Art Direction for a Comedy-Variety or Music Series

Year	Program	Episode(s)	Nominees	Network
1977 (29th)
1977 (29th)	The Mac Davis Show	"Susan Saint James, The Pointer Sisters, Robert Shields and Lorene Yarnell"	Romain Johnston	NBC
1977 (29th)	The Carol Burnett Show	"Glen Campbell"	Paul Barnes, Bill Harp, Bob Sansom	CBS
1977 (29th)	Donny & Marie	"Chad Everett and Florence Henderson"	Bill Bohnert, John Told	ABC
1977 (29th)	Saturday Night Live	"Host: Sissy Spacek"	Eugene Lee, Franne Lee, Leo Yoshimura	NBC
1978 (30th)
1978 (30th)	The Richard Pryor Show	"102"	Roy Christopher	NBC
1978 (30th)	Captain and Tenille	"120"	Romain Johnston	ABC
1978 (30th)	The Carol Burnett Show	"The Final Show"	Paul Barnes, Bill Harp, Bob Sansom	CBS
1978 (30th)	Donny & Marie	"Red Foxx, Kris Kristofferson and Paul Lynde"	Arlene Alen, Bill Bohnert	ABC
1978 (30th)	Saturday Night Live	"Host: Steve Martin"	Eugene Lee, Franne Lee, Lee Mayman, Leo Yoshimura	NBC

=== 1980s ===
Outstanding Art Direction for a Variety or Music Program

Year	Program	Episode(s)	Nominees	Network
1980 (32nd)
1980 (32nd)	Baryshnikov on Broadway		Dwight Jackson, Charles Lisanby	ABC
1980 (32nd)	The Big Show	"Sarah Purcell and Flip Wilson"	Brian C. Bartholomew, Tom Bugenhagen, Bob Keene	NBC
1980 (32nd)	The Muppet Show	"Beverly Sills"	Malcolm Stone	Syndicated
1980 (32nd)	Shirley MacLaine... "Every Little Movement"		Debe Hendrick, Romain Johnston	CBS
1981 (33rd)
1981 (33rd)	The 53rd Annual Academy Awards		Roy Christopher	ABC
1981 (33rd)	Barbara Mandrell and the Mandrell Sisters	"Charley Pride"	Romain Johnston, Jim Wagner	ABC
1981 (33rd)	Diana		Dwight Jackson, Charles Lisanby	CBS
1981 (33rd)	Lynda Carter's Celebration		Walter L. Goodwin, Ray Klausen	CBS
1981 (33rd)	The Muppet Show	"Brooke Shields"	Malcolm Stone	Syndicated
1981 (33rd)	The Tonight Show Starring Johnny Carson	"Charles Nelson Reilly"	John Shrum	NBC
1982 (34th)
1982 (34th)	The 54th Annual Academy Awards		Ray Klausen	ABC
1982 (34th)	Barbara Mandrell and the Mandrell Sisters	"Tom Jones and R.C. Bannon"	Romain Johnston, Jim Wagner	ABC
1982 (34th)	Baryshnikov in Hollywood		Roy Christopher	CBS
1982 (34th)	Olivia Newton-John: Let's Get Physical		Kim Colefax	ABC
1982 (34th)	Working (American Playhouse)		Dwight Jackson, Charles Lisanby	PBS
1983 (35th)
1983 (35th)	The 55th Annual Academy Awards		Michael Corenblith, Ray Klausen	ABC
1983 (35th)	George Burns and Other Sex Symbols		Rene Lagler	NBC
1983 (35th)	Motown 25: Yesterday, Today, Forever		Bob Keene	NBC
1983 (35th)	Sheena Easton... Act One		Romain Johnston	NBC
1983 (35th)	Solid Gold Christmas Special '82		Rene Lagler, Larry Wiemer	Syndicated
1984 (36th)
1984 (36th)	The 56th Annual Academy Awards		Roy Christopher	ABC
1984 (36th)	The 6th Annual Kennedy Center Honors: A Celebration of the Performing Arts		Ray Klausen	CBS
1984 (36th)	Live... and in Person	"101"	Debe Hale, Rene Lagler	NBC
1984 (36th)	Lynda Carter: Body and Soul		Debe Hale, Romain Johnston	CBS
1984 (36th)	On Stage America	"Premiere"	Debe Hale, Rene Lagler	Syndicated
1985 (37th)
1985 (37th)	The 57th Annual Academy Awards		Rene Lagler, Jeremy Railton	ABC
1985 (37th)	The American Music Awards		Ray Klausen	ABC
1985 (37th)	Motown Returns to the Apollo		Bob Keene	CBS
1985 (37th)	The 1st Annual MTV Video Music Awards		Charles Lisanby	Syndicated
1985 (37th)	The 11th Annual People's Choice Awards		William H. Harris, Anthony Sabatino	CBS
1986 (38th)
1986 (38th)	The 58th Annual Academy Awards		Roy Christopher	ABC
1986 (38th)	Alice in Wonderland	"Part 2"	Ross Bellah, Audrey Blasdel-Goddard, Hub Braden, Phillip M. Jefferies, Robert De Vestel	CBS
1986 (38th)	The Kennedy Center Honors: A Celebration of the Performing Arts		Rebecca Holler Barkley, Ray Klausen	CBS
1986 (38th)	The Magic of David Copperfield... In China		John Shaffner, Joe Stewart, Jack Hart	CBS
1986 (38th)	The 12th Annual People's Choice Awards		William H. Harris, Anthony Sabatino	CBS
1987 (39th)
1987 (39th)	Liberty Weekend — Closing Ceremonies		Charles Lisanby	ABC
1987 (39th)	The 59th Annual Academy Awards		Roy Christopher, Gregory S. Richman	ABC
1987 (39th)	Diana Ross: Red Hot Rhythm and Blues		Romain Johnston	ABC
1987 (39th)	Happy Birthday, Hollywood		Randy L. Blom, Paul Galbraith, Ray Klausen	ABC
1987 (39th)	The Magic of David Copperfield IX: The Escape from Alcatraz		John Shaffner, Joe Stewart, Jack Hart	CBS
1988 (40th)
1988 (40th)	Barry Manilow: Big Fun on Swing Street		Charles Lisanby	CBS
1988 (40th)	Jay Leno's Family Comedy Hour		Romain Johnston	NBC
1988 (40th)	The Magic of David Copperfield X: The Bermuda Triangle		John Shaffner, Joe Stewart	CBS
1988 (40th)	We the People 200: The Constitutional Gala		Rene Lagler	CBS
1988 (40th)	Women of the Night II		Jane Fletcher	HBO
1989 (41st)
1989 (41st)	The Tracey Ullman Show	"All About Tammy Lee Maggie in Peril, Part 2"	Portia Iversen, Bernie Yeszin	Fox
1989 (41st)	The Glenn Miller Band Reunion		Roy Christopher, Greg Richman	PBS
1989 (41st)	The Magic of David Copperfield XI: The Explosive Encounter		John Shaffner, Joe Stewart	CBS
1989 (41st)	The Pat Sajak Show	"Jeffrey Osborne"	Fred Cooper, Fred M. Duer, William H. Harris, Anthony Sabatino	CBS
1989 (41st)	Pee-wee's Playhouse Christmas Special		Jimmy Cuomo, Ric Heitzman, Debbie Madalena, Gary Panter, Paul Reubens, Wayne White	CBS

=== 1990s ===
Year	Program	Episode(s)	Nominees	Network
1990 (42nd)
1990 (42nd)	The 62nd Annual Academy Awards		Roy Christopher, Greg Richman	ABC
1990 (42nd)	The 17th Annual American Music Awards		Randy Blom, Elina Katsioula, Ray Klausen	ABC
1990 (42nd)	Julie & Carol: Together Again		Rene Lagler	ABC
1990 (42nd)	Sammy Davis Jr. 60th Anniversary Celebration		Robert A. Coltrin, Bob Keene	ABC
1990 (42nd)	The Tracey Ullman Show	"Creative Differences," "Tea," "Jinx Haber Revisited"	Anne Ahrens, Richard James Lawrence, Stephen Lineweaver	Fox
1991 (43rd)
1991 (43rd)	The Magic of David Copperfield XIII: Mystery on the Orient Express		John Shaffner, Joe Stewart	CBS
1991 (43rd)	The 63rd Annual Academy Awards		Raymond Klausen, Keaton S. Walker	ABC
1991 (43rd)	Carol & Company	"Spudnik"	Portia Iversen, David Sackeroff	NBC
1992 (44th)
1992 (44th)	The Magic of David Copperfield XIV: Flying — Live the Dream		John Shaffner, Joe Stewart	CBS
1992 (44th)	The 64th Annual Academy Awards		Roy Christopher, Chris Idoine, Greg Richman	ABC
1992 (44th)	The Carol Burnett Show	"405"	Roy Christopher, Debe Hale, Ron Olsen	CBS
1992 (44th)	The 6th Annual Soul Train Music Awards		Alan Okazaki, Tony Sabatino, Scott M. Storey	Syndicated
1992 (44th)	The 45th Annual Tony Awards		John Falabella, Anna Louizos, Rosaria Sinisi	CBS
1993 (45th)
1993 (45th)	The Magic of David Copperfield XV: Fires of Passion		David Eckert, John Shaffner, Joe Stewart	CBS
1993 (45th)	The 65th Annual Academy Awards		Tony Buderwitz, Jerry Dunn, Bob Keene	ABC
1993 (45th)	Liza Minnelli Live from Radio City Music Hall		Michael Hotopp	NPT
1993 (45th)	The 1992 Tony Awards		John Falabella, Anna Louizos, Rosaria Sinisi	CBS
1993 (45th)	Tosca: In the Settings and at the Times of Tosca		Aldo Terlizzi	PBS
1994 (46th)
1994 (46th)	Porgy and Bess (American Playhouse / Great Performances)		John Gunter, Eric Walmsley	PBS
1994 (46th)	The 66th Annual Academy Awards		Randy L. Blom, Roy Christopher, Elina Katsioula	ABC
1994 (46th)	Late Show with David Letterman	"101"	Kathleen Ankers	CBS
1994 (46th)	The Tony Awards		Roy Christopher, Chris Idoine, Stephan G. Olson	CBS
1994 (46th)	Wheel of Fortune	"Wheel of Fortune in Miami"	Richard Eisbrouch, Renee Hoss-Johnson, Dick Stiles	Syndicated
1995 (47th)
1995 (47th)	Late Show with David Letterman	"379"	Kathleen Ankers	CBS
1995 (47th)	The 67th Annual Academy Awards		Randy L. Blom, Roy Christopher, Elina Katsioula	ABC
1995 (47th)	Barbra Streisand: The Concert		Marc Brickman, David George	HBO
1995 (47th)	Disney's Greatest Hits on Ice		Artie Contreras, Charles Lisanby, Keaton S. Walker	CBS
1995 (47th)	The Magic of David Copperfield XVI: Unexplained Forces		David Eckert, John Shaffner, Joe Stewart	CBS
1996 (48th)
1996 (48th)	Muppets Tonight	"Host: Tony Bennett"	Jim Dultz, Val Strazovec, Jenny Wilkinson	ABC
1996 (48th)	The 68th Annual Academy Awards		Rebecca Holler Barkley, Ray Klausen, Keaton S. Walker	ABC
1996 (48th)	The Best of Tracey Takes On...		Chez Cherry, Toby Corbett, Keith Neely, Sandy Struth	HBO
1996 (48th)	Magicians' Favorite Magicians		Rob Allen, Romain Johnston	CBS
1996 (48th)	The Tonight Show with Jay Leno	"914"	R. Brandt Daniels, Dennis Craig Roof	NBC
1997 (49th)
1997 (49th)	Centennial Olympic Games: Opening Ceremonies		Steve Bass, Bob Keene	NBC
1997 (49th)	The 69th Annual Academy Awards		Roy Christopher, Michael G. Gallenberg, Elina Katsioula	ABC
1997 (49th)	Bette Midler: Diva Las Vegas		Bob DeMora	HBO
1997 (49th)	Muppets Tonight	"Host: Jason Alexander"	Jim Dultz, Val Strazovec, Jenny Wilkinson	ABC
1997 (49th)	Tracey Takes On...	"Vegas"	Chez Cherry, Toby Corbett, Kristen Messina	HBO
1998 (50th)
1998 (50th)	Rodgers & Hammerstein's Cinderella		Julie Kaye Fanton, Edward L. Rubin, Randy Ser	ABC
1998 (50th)	The 70th Annual Academy Awards		Dorothy Christopher, Roy Christopher, Stephan G. Olson, Keaton S. Walker	ABC
1998 (50th)	The 40th Annual Grammy Awards		Bob Keene, Brian Stonestreet	CBS
1998 (50th)	Stomp Out Loud		Maggie Goldman, Steve Kimmel, Ben Oshman	HBO
1998 (50th)	Tracey Takes On...	"Smoking"	Chez Cherry, Chip Dox, Evette Knight	HBO
1999 (51st)
1999 (51st)	The 71st Annual Academy Awards		Roy Christopher, Stephan G. Olson	ABC
1999 (51st)	The 41st Annual Grammy Awards		Bob Keene, Brian Stonestreet	CBS
1999 (51st)	The Three Tenors: Paris 1998		René Lagler	PBS
1999 (51st)	Tracey Takes On...	"Obsession"	Toby Corbett, Suzuki Ingerslev, Evette Knight	HBO
1999 (51st)	Tracey Takes On...	"Scandal"	Chez Cherry, Suzuki Ingerslev, Evette Knight	HBO

=== 2000s ===
Year	Program	Episode(s)	Nominees	Network
2000 (52nd)
2000 (52nd)	The 42nd Annual Grammy Awards		Bob Keene, Brian Stonestreet	CBS
2000 (52nd)	The 72nd Annual Academy Awards		Bob Keene, Griff Lambert, Brian Stonestreet, Keaton S. Walker	ABC
2000 (52nd)	Cher: Live in Concert — From the MGM Grand in Las Vegas		Mark Fisher, Kent McFann, Bruce Ryan	HBO
2000 (52nd)	MADtv	"511"	John Sabato, Cecele DeStefano, D. Martyn Bookwalter, Daryn Reid Goodall	Fox
2000 (52nd)	Saturday Night Live: The 25th Anniversary Special		N. Joseph DeTullio, Eugene Lee, Keith Ian Raywood, Akira Yoshimura	NBC
2001 (53rd)
2001 (53rd)	Peter Pan Starring Cathy Rigby		John Iacovelli, Aaron King	A&E
2001 (53rd)	The 73rd Annual Academy Awards		Greg Richman, Keaton S. Walker, Tamlyn Wright	ABC
2001 (53rd)	The 43rd Annual Grammy Awards		Bob Keene, Brian Stonestreet	CBS
2001 (53rd)	MADtv	"610"	John Sabato, Cecele DeStefano, D. Martyn Bookwalter, Daryn Reid Goodall	Fox
2001 (53rd)	The Magic of David Copperfield: The Tornado of Fire		David Eckert, John Shaffner, Joe Stewart	CBS
2002 (54th)
2002 (54th)	Opening Ceremony Salt Lake 2002 Olympic Winter Games		Jeremy Railton, Richard Schreiber	ABC
2002 (54th)	A&E in Concert: Sting in Tuscany... All This Time		Anne Brahic, Keith Ian Raywood	A&E
2002 (54th)	The 74th Annual Academy Awards		Greg Richman, J. Michael Riva, Keaton S. Walker, Tamlyn Wright	ABC
2002 (54th)	The Concert for New York City		Anne Brahic, Keith Ian Raywood	VH1
2002 (54th)	The 44th Annual Grammy Awards		Bob Keene, Griff Lambert, Brian Stonestreet, Scott Welborn	CBS
2002 (54th)	MADtv	"MADtv's 3rd Annual Salute to the Movies"	John Sabato, D. Martyn Bookwalter, Daryn Reid Goodall	Fox
2003 (55th)
2003 (55th)	The 75th Annual Academy Awards		Roy Christopher, Greg Richman, Keaton S. Walker, Tamlyn Wright	ABC
2003 (55th)	Cedric the Entertainer Presents	"Pilot"	Dwight Jackson, Bruce Ryan, James Yarnell	Fox
2003 (55th)	The 45th Annual Grammy Awards		Alex Fuller, Bob Keene, Griff Lambert, Brian Stonestreet	CBS
2003 (55th)	MADtv	"806"	John Sabato, D. Martyn Bookwalter, Daryn Reid Goodall	Fox
2003 (55th)	Survivor	"The Tides Are Turning"	Elizabeth Fowler, Jesse Jensen, Daniel Munday, Dawn Schaefer, Kelly Van Patter	CBS

Outstanding Art Direction for a Variety, Music Program or Special

Year	Program	Episode(s)	Nominees	Network
2004 (56th) (Note: As a juried award, nominees had to garner 50% approval to win the award. None of the nominees met the benchmark and no award was given.)
2004 (56th)	The 76th Annual Academy Awards		Roy Christopher, Stephan G. Olson	ABC
2004 (56th)	The 46th Annual Grammy Awards		Steve Bass, Brian Stonestreet, Tamlyn Wright	CBS
2004 (56th)	MADtv	"MADtv's 200th Episode"	John Sabato, D. Martyn Bookwalter, Daryn Reid Goodall	Fox
2004 (56th)	Saturday Night Live	"Host: Elijah Wood"	N. Joseph DeTullio, Keith Ian Raywood, Akira Yoshimura	NBC
2004 (56th)	A Very Queer Eye Holiday		Thom Filicia, Valerie Nolan, John Paino, Aleta Shaffer	Bravo
2005 (57th)
2005 (57th)	The 47th Annual Grammy Awards		Steve Bass, Brian Stonestreet, Scott Welborn, Tamlyn Wright	CBS
2005 (57th)	The 77th Annual Academy Awards		Roy Christopher, Stephan G. Olson, Greg Richman	ABC
2005 (57th)	American Idol	"419"	Andy Walmsley, James Yarnell	Fox
2005 (57th)	First Invasion: The War of 1812		Vincent Kralyevich	History
2005 (57th)	MADtv	"1006"	John Sabato, D. Martyn Bookwalter, Daryn Reid Goodall	Fox

Outstanding Art Direction for Variety, Nonfiction, Reality or Reality-Competition Programming

Year	Program	Episode(s)	Nominees	Network
2006 (58th)
2006 (58th)	The 78th Annual Academy Awards		Roy Christopher, Greg Richman	ABC
2006 (58th)	American Idol	"519"	Andy Walmsley, James Yarnell	Fox
2006 (58th)	Dancing with the Stars	"206"	Patrick Doherty, James Yarnell	ABC
2006 (58th)	Rome: Engineering an Empire		Vincent Kralyevich	History
2006 (58th)	MADtv	"1115"	John Sabato, D. Martyn Bookwalter, Daryn Reid Goodall	Fox
2007 (59th)
2007 (59th)	The 79th Annual Academy Awards		J. Michael Riva, Gregory S. Richman, Tamlyn Wright	ABC
2007 (59th)	Tony Bennett: An American Classic		John Myhre, Tomas Voth, Barbara Cassel	NBC
2007 (59th)	Cirque Du Soleil: Corteo		Jean Rabasse	Bravo
2007 (59th)	Desperate Crossing: The Untold Story of the Mayflower		Katha Seidman, Kent Lanigan	History
2007 (59th)	Engineering an Empire	"Egypt"	Preeya Jensen	History
2007 (59th)	Hell's Kitchen	"210"	John Janavs, Robert Frye, Dawn Sinko	Fox
2007 (59th)	MADtv	"1209"	John Sabato, D. Martyn Bookwalter, Daryn Reid Goodall	Fox
2008 (60th)
2008 (60th)	The 80th Annual Academy Awards		Roy Christopher, Joe Celli	ABC
2008 (60th)	The 50th Annual Grammy Awards		Steve Bass, Brian Stonestreet, Alana Billingsley	CBS
2008 (60th)	Hell's Kitchen	"401"	John Janavs, Robert Frye, Stephen Paul Fackrell	Fox
2008 (60th)	MADtv	"1315"	Nicole Elespuru, James Yarnell, Daryn Reid Goodall	Fox
2008 (60th)	2007 MTV Video Music Awards		Scott M. Storey, Joe Celli, James Pearse Connelly	MTV
2009 (61st)
2009 (61st)	American Idol	"821/822"	Andy Walmsley, James Yarnell	Fox
2009 (61st)	2008 MTV Video Music Awards		Keith Ian Raywood, Scott M. Storey, Star Theodos Kahn, James Pearse Connelly	MTV
2009 (61st)	The 81st Annual Academy Awards		David Rockwell, Joe Celli, Dave Edwards	ABC
2009 (61st)	A Colbert Christmas: The Greatest Gift of All!		Ellen Waggett, Jo Winiarski, Kelly Hanson	Comedy Central
2009 (61st)	The 51st Annual Grammy Awards		Steve Bass, Brian Stonestreet, Alana Billingsley	CBS

=== 2010s ===
Year	Program	Episode(s)	Nominees	Network
2010 (62nd)
2010 (62nd)	The 82nd Annual Academy Awards		David Rockwell, Joe Celli	ABC
2010 (62nd)	American Idol	"Idol Gives Back"	James Yarnell, Gregg Rainwater, Dave Edwards	Fox
2010 (62nd)	Saturday Night Live	"Host: James Franco," "Host: Jon Hamm," "Host: Betty White"	Eugene Lee, Akira Yoshimura, Keith Ian Raywood, N. Joseph DeTullio	NBC
2010 (62nd)	The 63rd Annual Tony Awards		Steve Bass, Seth Easter	CBS
2010 (62nd)	The Tonight Show with Conan O'Brien	"101"	John Shaffner, Joe Stewart, Christopher Goumas	NBC
2010 (62nd)	The Who Super Bowl Halftime Show		Bruce Rodgers, Sean Dougall, Mai Sakai	CBS
2011 (63rd)
2011 (63rd)	2010 MTV Video Music Awards		Florian Wieder, Isabell Rauert, Tamlyn Rae Wright	MTV
2011 (63rd)	American Idol	"Episode 1018"	James Yarnell, Dave Edwards	Fox
2011 (63rd)	The 83rd Annual Academy Awards		Steve Bass, Joe Celli, Kristen Merlino	ABC
2011 (63rd)	Gettysburg		Sylvain Gingras, Emma Eunson	History
2011 (63rd)	Saturday Night Live	"Host: Russell Brand"	Eugene Lee, Akira Yoshimura, Keith Ian Raywood, N. Joseph DeTullio	NBC
2012 (64th)
2012 (64th)	The 54th Annual Grammy Awards		Brian Stonestreet, Alana Billingsley, Matt Steinbrenner	CBS
2012 (64th)	The 65th Annual Tony Awards		Steve Bass, Seth Easter	CBS
2012 (64th)	The Oscars		John Myhre, Joe Celli	ABC
2012 (64th)	Saturday Night Live	"Host: Jimmy Fallon"	Eugene Lee, Akira Yoshimura, Keith Ian Raywood, N. Joseph DeTullio	NBC
2012 (64th)	The Voice	"Blind Auditions, Part 2," "Battle Rounds, Part 1," "Live Shows, Part 4"	Anton Goss, James Connelly, Zeya Maurer	NBC
2013 (65th)
2013 (65th)	London 2012 Olympic Games Opening Ceremony		Mark Tildesley, Suttirat Anne Larlarb, Danny Boyle	NBC
2013 (65th)	Saturday Night Live	"Host: Justin Timberlake", "Host: Martin Short" and "Host: Ben Affleck"	Eugene Lee, Akira Yoshimura, Keith Ian Raywood	NBC
2013 (65th)	Dancing with the Stars	"Episode 1608A"	James Yarnell, David Edwards, Jason Howard	ABC
2013 (65th)	The Oscars		Derek McLane, Joe Celli	ABC
2013 (65th)	The Voice	"Battle Rounds, Part 1," "The Live Shows," "Semi-Finals," "The Blind Auditions, Part 1"	Anton Goss, James Pearse Connelly, Zeya Maurer	NBC
2014 (66th)
2014 (66th)	The Oscars		Derek McLane, Joe Celli, Gloria Lamb	ABC
2014 (66th)	Portlandia	"Celery", "Sharing Finances" and "3D Printer".	Tyler Robinson, Schuyler Telleen, Katherine Isom	IFC
2014 (66th)	Saturday Night Live	"Host: Jimmy Fallon", "Host: Jonah Hill" and "Host: Anna Kendrick"	Eugene Lee, Akira Yoshimura, Keith Ian Raywood, N. Joseph DeTullio	NBC
2014 (66th)	Sochi 2014 Olympic Winter Games Opening Ceremony		George Tsypin, Rob Bissinger	NBC
2014 (66th)	The Voice	"Episode 601"	Anton Goss, James Pearse Connelly, Zeya Maurer, Lydia Smyth, Kristen O'Malley	NBC

Outstanding Production Design For Variety, Nonfiction, Reality or Reality-Competition Programming

Year	Program	Episode(s)	Nominees	Network
2015 (67th)
2015 (67th)	Portlandia	"Dead Pets", "Call Me Al" and "Fashion".	Tyler Robinson, Schuyler Telleen, Katherine Isom	IFC
2015 (67th)	The 57th Annual Grammy Awards		Brian Stonestreet, Alana Billingsley, Kristen Merlino, Scott Welborn	CBS
2015 (67th)	The Oscars		Derek McLane, Gloria Lamb, Matt Steinbrenner	ABC
2015 (67th)	Peter Pan Live!		Derek McLane, Aimee B. Dombo, Mike Pilipski	NBC
2015 (67th)	The Voice	"Episode 701"	Anton Goss, James Pearse Connelly, Zeya Maurer, Lydia Smyth	NBC

Outstanding Production Design for a Variety, Nonfiction, Reality or Reality-Competition Series

Year	Program	Episode(s)	Nominees	Network
2016 (68th)
2016 (68th)	Portlandia	"Family Emergency," "Pickathon," "Weirdo Beach"	Schuyler Telleen, Katherine Isom	IFC
2016 (68th)	Drunk History	"New Jersey"	Rachel Robb Kondrath, Kellie Jo Tinney	Comedy Central
2016 (68th)	Key & Peele	"Y'all Ready for This," "The End"	Gary Kordan, Julie Drach	Comedy Central
2016 (68th)	Saturday Night Live	"Hosts: Tina Fey & Amy Poehler," "Host: Larry David," "Host: Peter Dinklage"	Eugene Lee, Akira Yoshimura, Keith Ian Raywood, Joe DeTullio	NBC
2016 (68th)	The Voice	"Live Finale, Part 2," "Blind Auditions Premiere, Part 2," "Live Semifinal Performances"	Anton Goss, James Pearse Connelly, Zeya Maurer, Lydia Smyth, Stephanie Trigg Hines	NBC
2017 (69th)
2017 (69th)	Saturday Night Live	"Host: Alec Baldwin"	Eugene Lee, Akira Yoshimura, Keith Ian Raywood, Joe DeTullio	NBC
2017 (69th)	Bill Nye Saves the World	"Earth Is a Hot Mess"	James Pearse Connelly, Lydia Smyth, Stephanie Hines Trigg	Netflix
2017 (69th)	Drunk History	"Hamilton"	Chloe Arbiture, Monica Soto, Rae Deslich	Comedy Central
2017 (69th)	Portlandia	"Fred's Cell Phone Company"	Schuyler Telleen, Katherine Isom	IFC
2017 (69th)	The Voice	"Live Finale, Part 1"	Anton Goss, James Pearse Connelly, Zeya Maurer, Brittany MacWhorter, Stephanie Hines Trigg	NBC

Outstanding Production Design for a Variety, Reality or Reality-Competition Series

Year	Program	Episode(s)	Nominees	Network
2018 (70th)
2018 (70th)	Saturday Night Live	"Host: Bill Hader"	Eugene Lee, Akira Yoshimura, Keith Ian Raywood, N. Joseph DeTullio	NBC
2018 (70th)	Bill Nye Saves the World	"Extinction: Why All Our Friends Are Dying"	James Pearse Connelly, James Nelson, John Calderon, Heather Cantrell	Netflix
2018 (70th)	Dancing with the Stars	"Night at the Movies," "Halloween," "Finale"	James Yarnell, Steve Morden, John Sparano	ABC
2018 (70th)	Last Week Tonight with John Oliver	"Episode 418"	Eric Morrell	HBO
2018 (70th)	The Voice	"The Blind Auditions Season Premiere"	Anton Goss, James Pearse Connelly, Lydia Smith, Zeya Maurer, Stephanie Hines	NBC
2019 (71st)
2019 (71st)	Saturday Night Live	"Host: John Mulaney," "Host: Emma Stone"	Eugene Lee, Akira Yoshimura, Keith Ian Raywood	NBC
2019 (71st)	At Home with Amy Sedaris	"Teenagers"	Jason Singleton, Naomi Munro, Kim Fischer	truTV
2019 (71st)	Last Week Tonight with John Oliver	"Authoritarianism"	Eric Morrell, Ipek Celik	HBO
2019 (71st)	Queer Eye	"Jones Bar-B-Q"	Thomas Rouse	Netflix
2019 (71st)	The Voice	"Live Cross Battles Part 1"	Anton Goss, James Pearse Connelly, Zeya Maurer, Brittany Perham-MacWhorter, Emily Auble	NBC

=== 2020s ===
Year	Program	Episode(s)	Nominees	Network
2020 (72nd)
2020 (72nd)	Saturday Night Live	"Host: Eddie Murphy", "Host: John Mulaney"	Eugene Lee, Akira Yoshimura, Keith Ian Raywood, N. Joseph DeTullio	NBC
2020 (72nd)	At Home with Amy Sedaris	"Outdoor Entertaining", "Travel"	Jason Singleton, Katy Porter, Naomi Munro	truTV
2020 (72nd)	Drunk History	"Bad Blood"	Monica Sotto, Rae Deslich, Linette McCown	Comedy Central
2020 (72nd)	Last Week Tonight with John Oliver	"Episode 629"	Eric Morrell, Amanda Carzoli	HBO
2020 (72nd)	Queer Eye	"We're in Japan!: The Ideal Woman"	Thomas Rouse	Netflix
2021 (73rd)
2021 (73rd)	Saturday Night Live	"Host: Kristen Wiig"	Eugene Lee, Akira Yoshimura, Keith Ian Raywood, N. Joseph DeTullio, Melissa Shakun	NBC
2021 (73rd)	Last Week Tonight with John Oliver	"Trump & Election Results / F*ck 2020"	Eric Morrell, Veronica Spink	HBO
2021 (73rd)	The Late Show with Stephen Colbert	"Dr. Jon Lapook / Maroon 5"	Jim Fenhagen, Larry Hartman, Brendan Hurley, Riley Mellon	CBS
2021 (73rd)	The Masked Singer	"The Season Premiere - The Masks Return"	James Pearse Connelly, Ryan Suchor, Lisa Nelson	Fox
2021 (73rd)	RuPaul's Drag Race	"Condragulations", "Bossy Rossy RuBoot"	James McGowan, Gianna Costa	VH1
2022 (74th)
2022 (74th)	RuPaul's Drag Race	"Catwalk"	Gianna Costa, Allison Spain	VH1
2022 (74th)	A Black Lady Sketch Show	"Anybody Have Something I Can Flog Myself With?"	Cindy Chao, Michele Yu, Lizzie Boyle	HBO
2022 (74th)	The Late Show with Stephen Colbert	"Colbert's Lord of the Rings Rap Celebrates 20 Years of the Greatest Trilogy in Movie History"	Jim Fenhagen, Larry Hartman, Brendan Hurley, Riley Mellon	CBS
2022 (74th)	Queer Eye	"Angel Gets Her Wings"	Thomas Rouse, Josh Smith	Netflix
2022 (74th)	Saturday Night Live	"Host: Kim Kardashian"	Eugene Lee, Akira Yoshimura, Keith Ian Raywood, N. Joseph DeTullio, Melissa Shakun	NBC
2023 (75th)
2023 (75th)	Saturday Night Live	"Host: Steve Martin & Martin Short", "Host: Jenna Ortega"	Akira Yoshimura, Keith Ian Raywood, Andrea Purcigliotti, Danielle Webb	NBC
2023 (75th)	A Black Lady Sketch Show	"Peek-A-Boob, Your Titty's Out"	Cindy Chao, Michele Yu, Lizzie Boyle	HBO
2023 (75th)	Last Week Tonight with John Oliver	"Museums"	Eric Morrell, Sabrina Lederer	HBO
2023 (75th)	Queer Eye	"Speedy for Life"	Thomas Rouse, Tyka Edwards	Netflix
2023 (75th)	RuPaul's Drag Race	"Blame It on the Edit"	Gianna Costa, Brad Bailey	MTV
2024 (76th)
2024 (76th)	Saturday Night Live	"Host: Josh Brolin"	Joe DeTullio, Kenneth MacLeod, Melissa Shakun, Kimberly Kachougian	NBC
2024 (76th)	Last Week Tonight with John Oliver	"Freight Trains"	Eric Morrell, Amanda Carzoli	HBO
2024 (76th)	The Late Show with Stephen Colbert	"February 11, 2024"	Jim Fenhagen, Larry Hartman, Riley Mellon, Brendan Hurley	CBS
2024 (76th)	RuPaul's Drag Race	"RDR Live!", "Werq the World"	Gianna Costa, Jen Chu, Gavin Smith	MTV
2024 (76th)	Squid Game: The Challenge	"War"	Mathieu Weekes, Ben Norman, Lizzie Chambers	Netflix
2025 (77th)
2025 (77th)	Saturday Night Live	"Host: Lady Gaga"	Akira Yoshimura, Keith Ian Raywood, N. Joseph DeTullio, Andrea Purcigliotti, Patrick Lynch, Sara Parks	NBC
2025 (77th)	The Daily Show	"Jon Stewart and the News Team Live at the Chicago DNC"	Dave Edwards, Lauren Browning	Comedy Central
2025 (77th)	Jimmy Kimmel Live!	"The Chanucorn & Hawk Tuah Girl's Romantic Holiday Movie; Ft. Nikki Glaser, Nicholas Hoult, and Musical Guest Broadway Musical: "The Outsiders"", "MAGA Elf on a Shelf; Ft. Josh Brolin, Clarence Maclin, and Musical Guest Raye", "Jimmy Kimmel's Aunt Chippy Meets Oscar the Grouch; Ft. Justin Theroux, Antoni Porowski and Musical Guest Sia"	David Ellis, Hillarie Brigode, Heidi Miller	ABC
2025 (77th)	Last Week Tonight with John Oliver	"Mass Deportations"	Eric Morrell, Hugh Zeigler, Amanda Carzoli	HBO
2025 (77th)	RuPaul's Drag Race	"RDR Live!"	Jen Chu, Gavin Smith	MTV
2026 (78th)
2026 (78th)	The Traitors	"The Black Banquet"	Stuart Frossell, Luke Fuller, Georgia Picton, Alex Robertson, Rosie Westwood, Celina Hodge	Peacock
2026 (78th)	Jimmy Kimmel Live!	"Guests: Stephen Colbert, Seth Meyers, Kumail Nanjiani, Josh Meyers, and Musical Guest Reneé Rapp"	David Ellis, Hillarie Brigode, Heidi Miller	ABC
2026 (78th)	The Late Show with Stephen Colbert	"Guests: John Krasinski, and Special Appearances"	Jim Fenhagen, Larry Hartman, Brendan Hurley, Riley Mellon	CBS
2026 (78th)	RuPaul's Drag Race	"RDR Live Returns!"	Jen Chu, Tyler Stone, Melissa Arcaro	MTV
2026 (78th)	Saturday Night Live	"Host: Jack Black"	Akira Yoshimura, Keith Ian Raywood, N. Joseph DeTullio, Ken MacLeod, Melissa Shakun, Kimberly Kachougian	NBC

== Programs with multiple wins ==
9 wins

- Saturday Night Live

2 wins

- Cher
- Portlandia

== Programs with multiple nominations ==
Totals include nominations for Outstanding Art Direction for a Multi-Camera Series.

21 nominations

- Saturday Night Live

9 nominations

- MADtv

8 nominations

- The Carol Burnett Show
- The Voice

7 nominations

- Last Week Tonight with John Oliver

6 nominations

- RuPaul's Drag Race

5 nominations

- American Idol
- Hell's Kitchen
- Tracey Takes On...

4 nominations

- The Late Show with Stephen Colbert
- Portlandia
- Queer Eye

3 nominations

- Dancing with the Stars
- Drunk History
- The Flip Wilson Show
- The Glen Campbell Goodtime Hour

2 nominations

- At Home with Amy Sedaris
- Barbara Mandrell and the Mandrell Sisters
- Bill Nye Saves the World
- A Black Lady Sketch Show
- Cher
- Donny & Marie
- Engineering an Empire
- Jimmy Kimmel Live!
- Late Show with David Letterman
- The Muppet Show
- Muppets Tonight
- The Tracey Ullman Show
