= Primetime Emmy Award for Outstanding Production Design for a Variety Special =

Academy of Television Arts & Sciences accolade

Primetime Emmy Award for Production Design for a Variety Special
- Awarded for: Outstanding Production Design for a Variety Special
- Country: United States
- Presented by: Academy of Television Arts & Sciences
- Currently held by: The Muppet Show (2026)
- Website: emmys.com

The Primetime Emmy Award for Outstanding Production Design for Variety Special is awarded to one television special each year. Prior to the category's creation in 2016, specials and regular series competed together as Outstanding Production Design for a Variety, Nonfiction, Reality or Reality-Competition Programming. The two had also been divided in 1977 and 1978.

In the following list, the first titles listed in gold are the winners; those not in gold are nominees, which are listed in alphabetical order. The years given are those in which the ceremonies took place.

== Winners and nominations ==
indicates the winner

=== 1970s ===
Outstanding Art Direction for a Comedy-Variety or Music Special

Year	Program	Nominees	Network
1977 (29th)	Individual Art Direction or Scenic Design for a Comedy-Variety or Music Special		
1977 (29th)	America Salutes Richard Rodgers: The Sound of His Music	Robert Kelly	CBS
1977 (29th)	Billy the Kid: American Ballet Theatre (Great Performances)	Jac Venza	PBS
1977 (29th)	The George Burns Special	Roy Christopher, John Hueners	CBS
1977 (29th)	Les Patineurs: American Ballet Theatre (Great Performances)	William Mickley	PBS
1977 (29th)	Achievement in Coverage of Special Events – Individuals (Note: As a juried award, nominees had to garner 50% approval to win the award.)		
1977 (29th)	The 28th Annual Emmy Awards	Brian Bartholomew, Keaton S. Walker	ABC
1978 (30th)	Individual Art Direction for a Comedy-Variety or Music Special		
1978 (30th)	The Sentry Collection Presents Ben Vereen: His Roots	Romain Johnston, Kerry Joyce	ABC
1978 (30th)	Cher... Special	Brian C. Bartholomew	ABC
1978 (30th)	How to Survive the '70s and Maybe Even Bump Into Happiness	Roy Christopher, Don Remacle	CBS
1978 (30th)	Mitzi... Zings Into Spring	Robert Kelly	CBS
1978 (30th)	They Said It with Music: Yankee Doodle to Ragtime	Robert Checci, John Dapper, Romain Johnston	CBS
1978 (30th)	Special Classification of Outstanding Individual Achievement (Note: As a juried award, nominees had to garner 50% approval to win the award. The nominee did not meet the benchmark and no award was given.)		
1978 (30th)	CBS: On the Air	Jan Scott, Earl Carlson	CBS
1979 (31st)
1979 (31st)	Individual Achievement – Special Events (Note: As a juried award, nominees had to garner 50% approval to win the award. The nominee did not meet the benchmark and no award was given.)		
1979 (31st)	The 51st Annual Academy Awards	Roy Christopher	ABC

=== 1980s ===
Year	Program	Nominees	Network
1980 (32nd)
1980 (32nd)	Individual Achievement – Special Events (Note: As a juried award, nominees had to garner 50% approval to win the award. The nominee did not meet the benchmark and no award was given.)		
1980 (32nd)	The 52nd Annual Academy Awards	Ray Klausen	ABC
1988 (58th)
1988 (58th)	Individual Achievement – Special Events (Note: As a juried award, nominees had to garner 50% approval to win the award. The nominee did not meet the benchmark and no award was given.)		
1988 (58th)	The 60th Annual Academy Awards	Charles Lisanby, Keaton S. Walker	ABC

=== 2010s ===
Outstanding Production Design for a Variety, Nonfiction, Event or Award Special

Year	Program	Nominees	Network
2016 (68th)
2016 (68th)	Grease: Live	David Korins, Joe Celli, Jason Howard	Fox
2016 (68th)	He Named Me Malala	Alexander Fuller, Lori West	Nat Geo
2016 (68th)	Lemonade	Hannah Beachler, Chris Britt, Kim Murphy	HBO
2016 (68th)	The Oscars	Derek McLane, Gloria Lamb, Matt Steinbrenner	ABC
2016 (68th)	The Wiz Live!	Derek McLane, Erica Hemminger, Mike Pilipski	NBC
2017 (69th)
2017 (69th)	Hairspray Live!	Derek McLane, Joe Celli, Jason Howard	NBC
2017 (69th)	Full Frontal with Samantha Bee Presents Not the White House Correspondents' Dinner	John Yeck	TBS
2017 (69th)	The 74th Annual Golden Globes	Brian Stonestreet, John Zuiker	NBC
2017 (69th)	The Oscars	Derek McLane, Alana Billingsley	ABC
2017 (69th)	Super Bowl LI Halftime Show Starring Lady Gaga	Bruce Rodgers, LeRoy Bennett, Shelley Rodgers, Lindsey Breslauer	Fox

Outstanding Production Design for a Variety Special

Year	Program	Nominees	Network
2018 (70th)
2018 (70th)	Jesus Christ Superstar Live in Concert	Jason Ardizzone-West, Melissa Shakun	NBC
2018 (70th)	The Carol Burnett Show: 50th Anniversary Special	Joe Stewart, Joseph Mark Sarno	CBS
2018 (70th)	The 75th Annual Golden Globes	Brian Stonestreet, John Zuiker	NBC
2018 (70th)	The 60th Annual Grammy Awards	Brian Stonestreet, Kristen Merlino, Gloria Lamb	CBS
2018 (70th)	The Oscars	Derek McLane, Alana Billingsley, Kristen Merlino	ABC
2019 (71st)
2019 (71st)	Rent: Live	Jason Sherwood, Adam Rowe, John Sparano	Fox
2019 (71st)	The 61st Annual Grammy Awards	Brian Stonestreet, Kristen Merlino, Gloria Lamb	CBS
2019 (71st)	Homecoming: A Film by Beyoncé	Ric Lipson, Rachel Duncan, Andrew Makadsi	Netflix
2019 (71st)	Live in Front of a Studio Audience: Norman Lear's All in the Family and The Jeffersons	Bernard Vyzga, Richard Rohrer, Ron Olsen	ABC
2019 (71st)	The Oscars	David Korins, Alana Billingsley	ABC

=== 2020s ===
Year	Program	Nominees	Network
2020 (72nd)
2020 (72nd)	The Oscars	Jason Sherwood, Alana Billingsley	ABC
2020 (72nd)	The 77th Annual Golden Globe Awards	Brian Stonestreet, Angel Herrera	NBC
2020 (72nd)	The 62nd Grammy Awards	Brian Stonestreet, Kristen Merlino, Gloria Lamb, Jason Howard	CBS
2020 (72nd)	The Little Mermaid Live!	Misty Buckley, Joe Celli, Jason Howard	ABC
2020 (72nd)	Live in Front of a Studio Audience: "All in the Family" and "Good Times"	Bernard Vyzga, Richard Rohrer, Ron Olsen	ABC
2021 (73rd)
2021 (73rd)	The Oscars	David Rockwell, Joe Celli, Alana Billingsley, Jason Howard	ABC
2021 (73rd)	Friends: The Reunion	John Shaffner, Greg Grande, Daren Janes	HBO Max
2021 (73rd)	The 78th Annual Golden Globe Awards	Brian Stonestreet, John Zuiker	NBC
2021 (73rd)	The 63rd Annual Grammy Awards	Misty Buckley, Kristen Merlino, Gloria Lamb, Matt Steinbrenner	CBS
2021 (73rd)	Stephen Colbert's Election Night 2020: Democracy's Last Stand Building Back America Great Again Better 2020	Jim Fenhagen, Larry Hartman, Riley Mellon, Brendan Hurley	Showtime
2022 (74th)
2022 (74th)	The Pepsi Super Bowl LVI Halftime Show Starring Dr. Dre, Snoop Dogg, Mary J. Blige, Eminem, Kendrick Lamar and 50 Cent	Bruce Rodgers, Shelley Rodgers, Maria Garcia	NBC
2022 (74th)	The 64th Annual Grammy Awards	Julio Himede, Kristen Merlino	CBS
2022 (74th)	Live in Front of a Studio Audience: The Facts of Life and Diff'rent Strokes	Stephan Olson, Raf Lydon, Jerie Kelter	ABC
2022 (74th)	The Oscars	David Korins, Margaux Lapresle	ABC
2022 (74th)	Savage X Fenty Show Vol. 3	Willo Perron, Steve Morden, Marc Manabat	Prime Video
2023 (75th)
2023 (75th)	The Apple Music Super Bowl LVII Halftime Show Starring Rihanna	Bruce Rodgers, Shelley Rodgers, Lindsey Breslauer, Maria Garcia, Lily Rodgers	Fox
2023 (75th)	Carol Burnett: 90 Years of Laughter + Love	Tamlyn Wright, Travis Deck	NBC
2023 (75th)	Encanto at the Hollywood Bowl	Misty Buckley, Joe Celli, Raquel Tarbet	Disney+
2023 (75th)	The 65th Annual Grammy Awards	Julio Himede, Kristen Merlino	CBS
2023 (75th)	The Oscars	Misty Buckley, Alana Billingsley, John Zuiker	ABC
2024 (76th)
2024 (76th)	The Oscars	Misty Buckley, Alana Billingsley, John Zuiker, Margaux Lapresle	ABC
2024 (76th)	Dick Van Dyke 98 Years of Magic	Steve Morden, James Yarnell, John Sparano	CBS
2024 (76th)	The 66th Grammy Awards	Julio Himede, Kristen Merlino, Gloria Lamb, Ellen Jaworski, Kaydee Lavorin Friel	CBS
2024 (76th)	Hannah Waddingham: Home for Christmas	Misty Buckley, Laura Woodroffe, Richard Olivieri	Apple TV+
2024 (76th)	The 76th Annual Tony Awards	Steve Bass, Aaron Black, Star Theodos Kahn	CBS
2025 (77th)
2025 (77th)	The Oscars	Misty Buckley, Alana Billingsley, John Zuiker, Margaux Lapresle	ABC
2025 (77th)	Beyoncé Bowl	Willo Perron, Brian Stonestreet, Gloria Lamb, Jonathan Stoller-Schoff, Marina Skye	Netflix
2025 (77th)	The 67th Annual Grammy Awards	Julio Himede, Kristen Merlino, Gloria Lamb, Ellen Jaworski, Margaux Lapresle, Kaydee Lavorin	CBS
2025 (77th)	SNL50: The Anniversary Special	Akira Yoshimura, N. Joseph DeTullio, Patrick Lynch, Melissa Shakun, Charlotte Hayes Harrison, Sabrina Lederer	NBC
2025 (77th)	SNL50: The Homecoming Concert	Keith Ian Raywood, Anthony Bishop, Aaron Black	Peacock
2026 (78th)
2026 (78th)	The Muppet Show	Denise Pizzini, Chet Maxwell, Robert Aguirre, Bethany Barton	Disney+
2026 (78th)	The Apple Music Super Bowl LX Halftime Show Starring Bad Bunny	Bruce Rodgers, Shelley Rodgers, Lily Rodgers, Julio Himede, Leticia Leon	NBC
2026 (78th)	68th Annual Grammy Awards	Julio Himede, Kristen Merlino, Gloria Lamb, Ellen Jaworski, Scott Welborn, Kaydee Lavorin	CBS
2026 (78th)	The Oscars	Misty Buckley, Alana Billingsley, John Zuiker, Jonathan Stoller-Schoff	ABC
2026 (78th)	78th Annual Tony Awards	Steve Bass, Star Theodos Kahn, Aaron Black	CBS
