= Bethany Barton =

American author and illustrator

- Born: 1982 (age 43–44); Chicago, Illinois
- Occupations: Author, illustrator, artist
- Spouse: Michael Barton
- Writing career
- Pen name: bethany bARTon
- Period: 2006-present
- Genre: Children's picture books
- Website: www.bethanybarton.com

Bethany Barton is an author and illustrator of children's books, as well as an Emmy-award winning Set Decorator and Propmaster for film & TV. Barton's books combine colorful illustrations, humor, science communication and storytelling to make STEAM-related topics enjoyable for kids.

== Publishing career ==
Barton's 2015 book I’m Trying To Love Spiders (Viking/Penguin) garnered numerous awards and starred reviews, including the 2016 Children's Book Council's Children's Choice Award 3rd/4th Grade Book of The Year. Her 2017 book Give Bees A Chance (Viking/Penguin) was a 2017 SCIBA Award finalist, was listed in Scripps National Spelling Bee “Great Words, Great Works,” and was featured in the New York Times. Her books have been translated into four languages. Her 2019 book, I'm Trying to Love Math, was named an Amazon Best Book of 2019 and I'm Trying To Love Rocks (Viking/Penguin), hit stores in June 2020 with starred reviews. I'm Trying To Love Germs (Viking/Penguin) was published in November 2023 with School Library Journal calling it "a first purchase for any collection" in a starred review.

As well as illustrating her own stories, Barton has illustrated for other authors, including Todd Hasak-Lowy's middle grade novel 33 Minutes (Simon & Schuster). She often spends several weeks of the year touring; doing school visits, speaking to authors and educators, and sharing her stories and creativity with young readers at schools and libraries across the globe. She is represented by Writers House LLC.

== Film & Television Career ==
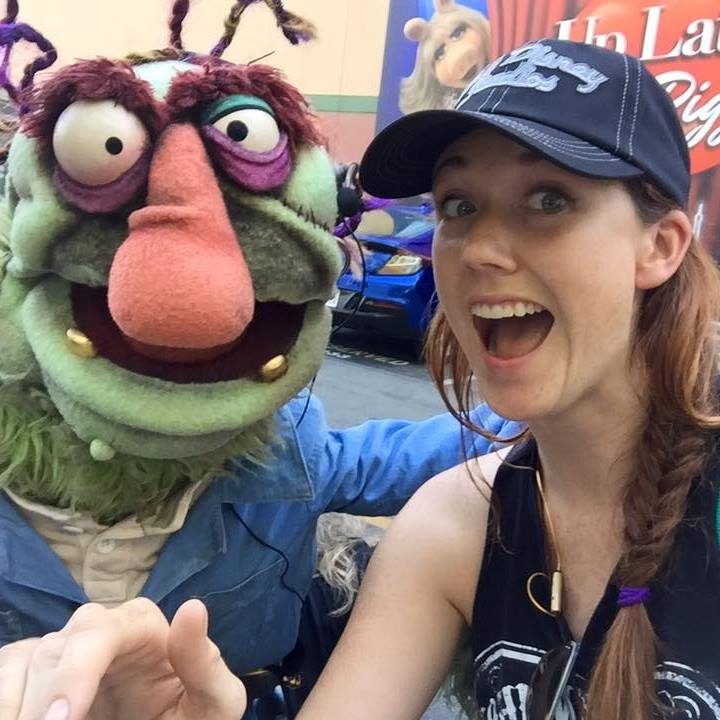
Bethany Barton on The Muppets set in 2015

Barton's career includes work in the art, prop, and set decoration departments for film & TV. In 2023, she was nominated for a Children's & Family Emmy in the category of Puppet Design & Styling for her work on The Muppets Mayhem. And in 2026 she won a Primetime Emmy Award for Outstanding Production Design for her Set Decoration of The Muppet Show. Notable projects include ABC Network's The Muppets, The Middle, Westworld, Obi-Wan Kenobi, Fallout, The Muppets Mayhem, The Muppet Show and Black-ish, as well as movies like Bumblebee, and various commercials.

== Non-Profit Work ==
In 2023, Bethany became a co-founder of the non-profit DopaMind, an organization created to "help young people navigate tech in the digital age."

== Books ==
- Brain Versus Screen: How Screen Time Affects Our Brains, 2026, Viking/Penguin
- I'm Trying To Love Farts, 2025, Viking/Penguin
- I'm Trying To Love Germs, 2023, Viking/Penguin
- I'm Trying To Love Garbage, 2021, Viking/Penguin
- I'm Trying To Love Rocks, 2020, Viking/Penguin
- I'm Trying To Love Math, 2019, Viking/Penguin
- Give Bees A Chance, 2017, Viking/Penguin
- I'm Trying To Love Spiders, 2015, Viking/Penguin
- 33 Minutes, 2013, by Todd Hasak-Lowy, illust. Bethany Barton, ISBN 1442445009
- This Monster Cannot Wait, 2013, Dial Books For Young Readers (Penguin), ISBN 0803737793
- This Monster Needs A Haircut, 2012, Dial Books For Young Readers (Penguin), ISBN 0803737335

== Book Awards ==
- 2016 Children's Choice Awards 3rd/4th Grade Book of the Year
- 2017 Beehive Book Award (Children's Literature Association of Utah)
- 2016-2017 Black-Eyed Susan Book Award (Maryland Association of School Librarians)
- 2017 Kentucky Bluegrass Award (Kentucky Association of School Librarians)
- 2018 Surrey Schools Narrative Non-Fiction Book of The Year (British Columbia)
- Amazon Best Book of 2020
- 2022 Oregon State Literacy Association’s Patricia Gallagher Children’s Choice Book Award

== Book Award Nominations ==
- 2017 SCIBA (Southern California Independent Booksellers Association) Book Award Finalist
- 2017-2018 South Carolina Picture Book Award
- 2016-2017 Charter Oak Children's Book Award
- 2017 Washington Children's Choice Picture Book Award
- 2017-2018 North Carolina Children's Book Award
- 2017-2018 Show Me Readers Award (Missouri Association of School Librarians)
- 2018 Monarch Award (Illinois School Library Media Association)
- 2018 Garden State Book Award
- 2019 Beehive Book Award (Children's Literature Association of Utah)
- 2021 Beehive Informational Book Awards (Children's Literature Association of Utah)
- 2022 Magnolia Book Award (Mississippi Children's Museum)
- 2023 North Carolina Children's Book Award

== Film/TV Awards ==
- Won: 2026 Primetime Emmy Awards in the Category of Outstanding Production Design for a Variety Special for The Muppet Show
- Nomination: 2022-2023 Children & Family Emmy Awards in the Category of Puppet Design & Styling for The Muppets Mayhem
- Nomination: Property Masters Guild MacGuffin Award in the Category of Half-Hour Single Camera Series for The Muppets Mayhem
