= Andy Walmsley =

British-born production designer (born 1966)

Andrew Walmsley (born September 1966) is a British-born production designer.

== Career ==
Walmsley was initially involved in the theatre industry. He designed sets for several musicals, including Buddy: The Buddy Holly Story and Blood Brothers. Later, he moved into television set design, developing the set for Who Wants to Be a Millionaire?, So You Think You Can Dance, and America's Got Talent.

Walmsley has been nominated three times for the Primetime Emmy Award for Outstanding Production Design for a Variety or Reality Series for his work on American Idol, winning in 2009.

Walmsley also works as a theatrical producer in Las Vegas, Nevada producing shows in casinos.
