= First Invasion: The War of 1812 =

- Directed by: Gary Foreman

Production
- Production company: Native Sun Productions

Original release
- Release: September 12, 2004

First Invasion: The War of 1812 is a documentary produced by the History Channel which aired on September 11, 2004. The film was about the American War of 1812, when the Americans fought the British for the first time since the American Revolutionary War.

== Reception ==
The film was nominated for an Emmy for Outstanding Art Direction for a Variety, Music Program or Special in 2005.

== Sources ==
- The History Channel website www.historychannel.com
- 1812 link

== See also ==
- War of 1812
