= Candide (operetta) =

Operetta with music by Leonard Bernstein

- Playbill from 1974 revival
- Music: Leonard Bernstein
- Lyrics: Richard Wilbur (primary); John Latouche; Dorothy Parker; Lillian Hellman; Stephen Sondheim; Leonard Bernstein
- Book: Lillian Hellman (1956 version); Hugh Wheeler (1974 version)
- Basis: Candide, novella by Voltaire
- Productions: 1956 Broadway; 1957 New York Philharmonic; 1973 Broadway revival; 1982 New York City Opera; 1988 Scottish Opera Version; 1997 Broadway revival; 1999 Royal National Theatre; 2004 & 2005 New York Philharmonic; 2006 Théâtre du Châtelet; 2008 New York City Opera; 2010 Goodman Theatre (Chicago), 5th Avenue Theatre (Seattle) & Shakespeare Theatre (DC); 2013 Menier Chocolate Factory; 2017 New York City Opera; 2018 Kennedy Center
- Awards: Tony Award for Best Book; Drama Desk for Outstanding Book

Candide is an operetta with music composed by Leonard Bernstein and lyrics primarily by the poet Richard Wilbur, based on the 1759 novella of the same name by Voltaire. Other contributors to the text were John Latouche, Dorothy Parker, Lillian Hellman, Stephen Sondheim, John Mauceri, John Wells, and Bernstein himself. Maurice Peress and Hershy Kay contributed orchestrations.

The operetta was first performed in 1956 with a libretto by Lillian Hellman, but since 1974 it has been generally performed with a book by Hugh Wheeler, which is more faithful to Voltaire's novella. Although unsuccessful at its premiere, Candide has overcome the unenthusiastic reaction of early audiences and critics, and achieved more popularity.

== Origins ==
Candide was originally conceived by Lillian Hellman as a play with incidental music in the style of her previous work, The Lark. Bernstein, however, was so excited about this idea that he convinced Hellman to do it as a "comic operetta"; she then wrote the original libretto for the operetta. Many lyricists worked on the show: first James Agee (whose work was ultimately not used), then Dorothy Parker, John Latouche and Richard Wilbur. In addition, the lyrics to "I Am Easily Assimilated" were done by Leonard and Felicia Bernstein, and Hellman wrote the words to "Eldorado". Hershy Kay orchestrated all but the overture, which Bernstein did himself.

Bernstein added, that in the song "I Am Easily Assimilated", there are personal connections to the lyrics as he mentions Rovno Gubernya, a governorate of the Russian Empire, in modern-day Ukraine, where his father grew up. As it rhymed with the rest of the text, he found it would be a comic element.

== Performance history ==
=== 1956 original Broadway production ===
Candide first opened on Broadway as a musical on December 1, 1956, at the Martin Beck Theatre. The premiere production was directed by Tyrone Guthrie and conducted by Samuel Krachmalnick. The sets and costumes were designed by Oliver Smith and Irene Sharaff, respectively. It was choreographed by Anna Sokolow. It featured Robert Rounseville as Candide, Barbara Cook as Cunegonde, Max Adrian as Dr. Pangloss, and Irra Petina as the Old Lady. This production was a box office disaster, running only two months for a total of 73 performances. Hellman's libretto was criticized in The New York Times as being too serious:

When Voltaire is ironic and bland, [Hellman] is explicit and vigorous. When he makes lightning, rapier thrusts, she provides body blows. Where he is diabolical, [she] is humanitarian ... the libretto ... seems too serious for the verve and mocking lyricism of Leonard Bernstein's score which, without being strictly 18th century, maintains, with its gay pastiche of past styles and forms, a period quality.

A 1958 national tour of the production presented in concert format traveled to 60 American cities with Rounseville, Petina, and other original cast members reprising their Broadway roles. Mary Costa portrayed Cunegonde in this production.

=== European premieres ===
The first London production debuted at the Saville Theatre on Shaftesbury Avenue on 30 April 1959 (after playing for a short time at the New Theatre Oxford and the Manchester Opera House). This production used Lillian Hellman's book with an additional credit 'assisted by Michael Stewart', and it was directed by Robert Lewis with choreography by Jack Cole. The cast included Denis Quilley as Candide, Mary Costa as Cunegonde, Laurence Naismith as Dr. Pangloss and Edith Coates as the Old Lady. The musical director was Alexander Faris.

=== Later productions ===
Without Bernstein's involvement, the show underwent a series of Broadway revivals under the direction of Harold Prince. Lillian Hellman, the author of the original book, refused to let any of her work be used in the revival, so Prince commissioned a new, one-act book from Hugh Wheeler. The sole element of Hellman's book that remained was her invented name (Maximillian) for Cunegonde's brother. (The character has no given name in Voltaire's novella, and is referred to as "Cunegonde's brother" or "the young Baron".)

The lyrics were worked on by the team of artists listed above. This 105-minute version, omitting over half of the musical numbers, was known as the "Chelsea version", and opened in 1973 at Robert Kalfin's Chelsea Theater Center in the Brooklyn Academy of Music, before moving to the Broadway Theatre in 1974 and running there for nearly two years, closing in 1976 after 740 performances. The 1974 Broadway revival starred Mark Baker (Candide), Maureen Brennan (Cunegonde), Sam Freed (Maximilian), Lewis J. Stadlen (Dr. Pangloss), and June Gable as the Old Lady.

The Chelsea version was marked by a unique production style. Eugene Lee helped Prince make sure that the multi-scene show would not get bogged down in set changes – he created platforms for the action that allowed scenes to change by refocusing attention instead of changing scenery. Actors performed on platforms in front, behind, and sometimes between audience members. Some sat on bleachers, others on stools on the stage floor. As the story unfolded, so did the stage, with sections falling from above, opening, closing, flying apart or coming together. A 13-member orchestra played from four areas. The conductor, who wore period costume and gold braid, could be seen by audience and musicians alike on television monitors.

In response to requests from opera companies for a more legitimate version, the show was expanded on the basis of Wheeler's book. The two-act "opera house version" contains most of Bernstein's music, including some songs that were not orchestrated for the original production. It was first performed by the New York City Opera (NYCO) in 1982 under Prince's direction, and ran for thirty-four performances with a cast that included David Eisler as Candide, Erie Mills as Cunegonde, Deborah Darr as Paquette, John Lankston in the quintuple roles of Voltaire/Pangloss/Businessman/Governor/Gambler, Muriel Costa-Greenspon as the Old Lady, Scott Reeve as Maximilian, Don Yule as the Huntsman and Bulgarian Soldier, and James Billings as the Judge/Father Bernard/Don Issachar/First Gambler/Maximilian's Servant. The cast filmed the production for national broadcast on PBS's Live from Lincoln Center in 1982. The NYCO later recorded this version of Candide in 1985 with the same cast with the exception of the roles of Paquette (now performed by Maris Clement) and the Old Lady (now performed by Joyce Castle). This recording was awarded the Grammy Award for Best Opera Recording in 1987. Opera companies around the world have performed this version, and the production has remained a staple of NYCO's repertoire with the most recent performance being given in 2019.

The Australian premiere in 1982 by the Nimrod Theatre Company and directed by John Bell at Sydney's Seymour Centre featured Philip Quast in the title role.

In 1988, Bernstein started working alongside John Mauceri, then director of Scottish Opera, to produce a version that expressed his final wishes regarding Candide. Wheeler died before he could work again on the text, and John Wells was engaged. The new show was first produced by Scottish Opera with the credit "Adapted for Scottish Opera by John Wells and John Mauceri". After Bernstein had attended the final rehearsals and the opening in Glasgow, he decided that the time had come for the composer himself to re-examine Candide. Taking the Scottish Opera version as a basis, he made changes in orchestration, shuffled the order of numbers in the second act, and altered the endings of several numbers. Bernstein then conducted and recorded what he called his "final revised version" with Jerry Hadley as Candide, June Anderson as Cunegonde, Christa Ludwig as the Old Lady, Kurt Ollmann as Maximilian and Adolph Green as Dr. Pangloss/Martin. Deutsche Grammophon released a DVD (2006, 147 min.), in 5.0 surround sound, of the 13 December 1989 recording at the London Barbican Centre, with a bonus video prologue and epilogue from the composer and a printed insert "Bernstein and Voltaire" by narrative collaborator Wells explaining what Bernstein wanted in this final revised version. A CD version, without Bernstein's commentary or audience applause, was also released by Deutsche Grammophon.

In 1993 a special version of Candide was recorded for television with a cast that featured: Ethan Freeman (Maximilian), Doug Jones (Candide), Colleen Besett (Kunigunde), James Brookes (Voltaire), Debria Brown (alte Dame), Bärbel Müller (Paquette), Werner Hollweg (Governour), Heidi Eisenberg (Baroness), Karl Oblasser, John Capes, Denis Kozeluh. The show was performed in both English and German and featured a cast of popular West End and German theatre artists.

The operetta was produced by Lyric Opera of Chicago and performed in the Civic Opera House, with direction by Harold Prince, opening November 26, 1994. Book adapted from Voltaire by Hugh Wheeler, lyrics by Richard Wilbur, with additional lyrics by Stephen Sondheim and John Latouche. This revised opera house version formed the basis for the 1997 Broadway Revival.

Candide was revived on Broadway in 1997, directed again by Harold Prince in a revised version of his 1982 New York City Opera staging. Lighting design by Ken Billington. The cast included: Jason Danieley (Candide), Harolyn Blackwell (Cunegonde), Jim Dale (Dr. Pangloss), Andrea Martin (Old Lady), and Brent Barrett (Maximilian).

In 1999, the Royal National Theatre produced Candide, with rewrites to Wheeler's book by John Caird. The production featured Daniel Evans, Denis Quilley, Alex Kelly and Beverley Klein, with musical direction by Mark Dorrell, and a recording was released on the RNT's own label.

A 2003 production in Japan starred Akinori Nakagawa as Candide.

Lonny Price directed a 2004 semi-staged concert production with the New York Philharmonic under conductor Marin Alsop. It ran for four performances, May 5–8, 2004. This production was also broadcast on PBS's Great Performances. The first-night performance was recorded and released as a DVD in 2005. The cast featured Paul Groves as Candide, Kristin Chenoweth as Cunegonde, Thomas Allen as Dr. Pangloss, Patti LuPone as the Old Lady, Jeff Blumenkrantz as Maximilian, and Stanford Olsen as the Governor/Vanderdendur/Ragotski with choruses from both Westminster Choir College and the Juilliard School completing the cast. This production included two rarely sung duets between Cunegonde and the Old Lady, "We Are Women" and "Quiet", which were included in Bernstein's 1989 final revised version.

In 2005, Candide premiered in Poland at the Grand Theatre at Łódź (conducted by Tadeusz Kozłowski, directed by Tomasz Konina).

In 2006, in honor of the 50th anniversary of the creation of Candide, the Théâtre du Châtelet in Paris produced a new production under the direction of Robert Carsen. This production later played at La Scala in 2007 and the London Coliseum in 2008.

The Goodman Theatre in Chicago in a co-production with The Shakespeare Theatre Company in Washington DC mounted a revised version adapted and directed by Mary Zimmerman featuring Hollis Resnik (2010), Lauren Molina (Cunegonde), Geoff Packard (Candide) and Larry Yando (Pangloss). The production, staged in a vast wooden box, with Candide's travels being portrayed through the use of maps and model ships, featured significant amounts of narration adapted directly from Voltaire's novel.

A concert performance at the Hollywood Bowl in September 2010, conducted by Bramwell Tovey, featured Richard Suart as Pangloss, Frederica von Stade as the Old Lady, Alek Shrader as the title character and Anna Christy as Cunegonde.

The Harold Prince/New York City Opera 1982 production was revived at the Rose Theater at Jazz at Lincoln Center in January 2017 with Prince directing and a cast including Gregg Edelman as Voltaire/Dr. Pangloss and various characters, Linda Lavin as The Old Lady, Jay Armstrong Johnson as Candide, Meghan Picerno as Cunegonde, Keith Phares as Maximilian, and Chip Zien and Brooks Ashmanskas.

In 2015, the Teatro Comunale, Florence production, produced by Francesco Micheli, featured Keith Jameson and Laura Claycomb as Candide and Cunegonde, with Richard Suart as Pangloss and Anja Silja and Chris Merritt as the Old Lady and the Governor.

Also in 2015, Lindy Hume staged the work for Opera Queensland with David Hobson as Candide, Amelia Farrugia as Cunegonde, Bryan Probets as Pangloss, Christine Johnston as the Old Lady and Paul Kildea conducting the Queensland Symphony Orchestra.

In September 2018, two performances of a production directed by Mitchell Butel was staged at the Sydney Opera House in Sydney, Australia, with the Sydney Philharmonia Choirs, Sydney Youth Orchestra, and stars from Opera Australia. Alexander Lewis played Candide, Annie Aitken was Cunegonde, and veteran actress Caroline O'Connor took the part of The Old Lady.

In March 2019, Minneapolis-based VocalEssence and Theater Latte' Da presented a semi-staged version directed by Peter Rothstein with music direction by Philip Brunelle. Set as a 1930s radio drama, the production sold out five performances and was critically acclaimed by the St. Paul Pioneer Press as "the Candide we've been waiting for". The Minneapolis Star Tribune named it first on a list of the city's ten best classical concerts of 2019.

In May 2024, a co-production by the State Theatre Company South Australia (STCSA) and State Opera South Australia was performed three times in Her Majesty's Theatre, Adelaide, under the direction of STCSA director Mitchell Butel, who also played Dr Pangloss and narrated the story. Alexander Lewis, Annie Aitken, and Caroline O'Connor reprised their roles of the 2018 Sydney version, while the cabaret artist "Hans the German" (aka Matt Gilbertson, who made his name at the Adelaide Fringe and Adelaide Cabaret Festivals) played Maximilian.

== Roles ==
- Candide (tenor)
- Dr. Pangloss (baritone; doubles with Martin in the 1956 stage version and Bernstein's 1989 revision. In the Hal Prince versions, he doubles with several other characters, including the narrator Voltaire and the Governor.)
- Maximilian (baritone, but can be sung by a tenor; it is a speaking role in the original 1956 version.)
- Cunegonde (soprano)
- Paquette (mezzo-soprano) (Although a major character in Voltaire's novella and all revivals of the show, she is a walk-on part with only one line in the 1956 stage version.)
- The Old Lady (mezzo-soprano)
- Martin (baritone. Doubles with Pangloss in the 1956 version and some later versions. Does not appear in the 1973 version.)
- Cacambo (speaking role. Does not appear in the 1956 or 1973 versions. Doubles with Pangloss and Martin in Bernstein's 1989 revisions.)

== Original principal casts ==
Character	Original Broadway cast 1956	Original London cast 1959	1st Broadway revival 1974	New York City Opera 1982	Scottish Opera 1988	2nd Broadway revival 1997	London revival 1999	Philharmonic concert 2004
Voltaire/Dr. Pangloss	Max Adrian	Laurence Naismith	Lewis J. Stadlen	John Lankston; Joseph McKee	Nickolas Grace	Jim Dale	Simon Russell Beale	Sir Thomas Allen
Candide	Robert Rounseville	Denis Quilley	Mark Baker	David Eisler	Mark Beudert	Jason Danieley	Daniel Evans	Paul Groves
Cunegonde	Barbara Cook	Mary Costa	Maureen Brennan	Erie Mills	Marilyn Hill Smith	Harolyn Blackwell	Alex Kelly	Kristin Chenoweth
Old Lady	Irra Petina	Edith Coates	June Gable	Muriel Costa-Greenspon; Judith Christin	Ann Howard	Andrea Martin	Beverley Klein	Patti LuPone
Maximilian	Louis Edmonds	Dennis Stephenson	Sam Freed	Scott Reeve; James Javore	Mark Tinkler	Brent Barrett	Simon Day	Jeff Blumenkrantz
Paquette	Gloria Stevens	N/A	Deborah St. Darr	Deborah St. Darr	Gaynor Miles	Stacey Logan	Elizabeth Renihan	Janine LaManna
Governor of Buenos Aires	William Olvis	Ron Moody	Lewis J. Stadlen	John Lankston; Joseph McKee	Bonaventura Bottone	Jim Dale	David Burt	John Herrera
Cacambo	N/A	N/A	N/A	N/A	Nickolas Grace	N/A	Clive Rowe	Michael McCormick
Martin	Max Adrian	Laurence Naismith	N/A	N/A	Nickolas Grace	N/A	Denis Quilley	N/A

== Synopsis ==
=== Original Broadway version (1956) ===
Act 1

In the country of Westphalia, Candide is about to be married to the lovely Cunegonde. Dr. Pangloss, Candide's teacher, expounds his famous philosophy, to the effect that all is for the best ("The Best of All Possible Worlds") The happy couple sing their marriage duet ("Oh, Happy We"), and the ceremony is about to take place ("Wedding Chorale") when war breaks out between Westphalia and Hesse. Westphalia is destroyed, and Cunegonde is raped, multiple times, and seemingly killed. Candide takes comfort in the Panglossian doctrine ("It Must Be So") and sets out on his journeys.

In the public square of Lisbon ("Lisbon Fair"), the Infant Casmira, a deranged mystic in the caravan of an Arab conjuror, predicts dire happenings ("The Prediction"), leaving the public in terror ("Pray For Us"). Candide discovers Pangloss, who has contracted syphilis, yet remains optimistic ("Dear Boy"*). The Inquisition appears, in the persons of two ancient Inquisitors and their lawyer, and many citizens are tried and sentenced to hang, including Candide and Dr. Pangloss ("The Inquisition: Auto-da-Fé"*). Suddenly an earthquake occurs, killing Dr. Pangloss, and Candide barely escapes.

Candide, faced with the loss of both Cunegonde and Dr. Pangloss, starts out for Paris. He is unable to reconcile Dr. Pangloss's ideas with the bitter events that have occurred, but concludes that the fault must lie within himself, rather than in the philosophy of optimism ("It Must Be Me").

Cunegonde turns up alive in Paris ("The Paris Waltz"), a demi-mondaine in a house shared by a Marquis and a Sultan. A party is in progress. Urged by the Old Lady, who serves as her duenna, Cunegonde arrays herself in her jewels ("Glitter and Be Gay"). Candide stumbles into the scene and is amazed to find Cunegonde still alive ("You Were Dead, You Know"). In a duel, he kills both the Marquis and the Sultan, and flees with Cunegonde, accompanied by the Old Lady.

They fall in with a band of devout Pilgrims on their way to the New World and sail with them ("Pilgrims' Procession" / "Alleluia"). Arriving in Buenos Aires, the group is brought to the Governor's Palace (where Maximilian is alive and working for the Governor), where all except Cunegonde and the Old Lady are immediately enslaved. A street cleaner appears in the person of the pessimistic Martin, warning Candide of the future. Candide and Maximilian are joyfully reunited, but when Candide states his intention to marry Cunegonde, Maximilian starts to strike him with a glove. Candide starts to strike him back, but before he actually does Maximilian drops, apparently dead. The Governor serenades Cunegonde ("My Love") and she, abetted by the Old Lady, agrees to live in the palace ("I Am Easily Assimilated"). The Old Lady urges Candide to flee, but Candide, fired by reports of Eldorado from Martin, sets off to seek his fortune, planning to return for Cunegonde later ("Quartet Finale").

Act 2

In the heat of Buenos Aires, Cunegonde, the Old Lady and the Governor display their fraying nerves ("Quiet"), and the Governor resolves to get rid of the tiresome ladies. Candide returns from Eldorado ("Eldorado"), his pockets full of gold and searches for Cunegonde. The Governor, however, has had both Cunegonde and the Old Lady tied up in sacks and carried to a boat in the harbor. He tells Candide that the women have sailed for Europe, and Candide eagerly purchases a leaky ship from the Governor and dashes off. As the Governor and his suite watch from his terrace, the ship with Candide and Martin casts off and almost immediately sinks ("Bon Voyage").

Candide and Martin have been rescued from the ship, and are floating about the ocean on a raft. Martin is devoured by a shark, but Dr. Pangloss miraculously reappears. Candide is overjoyed to find his old teacher, and Pangloss sets about repairing the damage done to his philosophy by Candide's experiences.

In a luxurious palazzo of Venice ("Money, Money, Money"), Cunegonde turns up as a scrubwoman and the Old Lady as a woman of fashion (Madame Sofronia) ("What's the Use?"), both working as shills for Ferone, the owner of a gambling hall. Candide and Dr. Pangloss, both wearing masks, appear and are caught up by the merriment, the wine and the gambling. Candide is accosted by a masked Cunegonde and Old Lady, who try to steal his remaining gold ("The Venice Gavotte"), but recognizes Cunegonde when her mask falls off. His last hopes and dreams shattered, he drops his money at her feet and leaves. Cunegonde and the Old Lady are fired by Ferone and Pangloss is now penniless, having been completely swindled out of all his money.

With Candide now completely disillusioned, he and Pangloss return to the ruined Westphalia. Cunegonde, Maximilian (minus his teeth) and the Old Lady appear and within them a spark of optimism still flickers. Candide, however, has had enough of the foolish Panglossian ideal and tells them all that the only way to live is to try to make some sense of life ("Make Our Garden Grow").

=== Bernstein's "Final Revised Version" (1989) ===
Act 1

The operetta begins with an overture. The chorus welcomes everyone to Westphalia ("Westphalia Chorale") and Voltaire begins to narrate his story. Candide, the illegitimate nephew of Baron Thunder-ten-Tronck, lives in the Baron's castle Schloss Thunder-ten-Tronck. He is snubbed by the Baroness and bullied by her son Maximilian. Paquette, a very accommodating serving girl, also lives in the castle. However, Candide is in love with Cunegonde, the Baroness' daughter as Maximilian, Candide, Cunegonde and Paquette find their happiness in life ("Life is Happiness Indeed"). The four discover that Dr. Pangloss, a man thought to be the world's greatest philosopher, has taught them happiness ("The Best of All Possible Worlds"). The philosopher asks his four students to summarize what they have learned ("Universal Good"). When Cunegonde spies Dr. Pangloss being physically intimate with Paquette, he explains it away as being a "physical experiment", and she decides to share the "experiment" with Candide. Professing their love to each other at a park, Candide and Cunegonde dream of what married life would look like ("Oh, Happy We"). The Baron, however, is angered at what Candide has done to Cunegonde, as he is a social inferior. Candide is promptly exiled, wandering alone with his faith and optimism to cling to ("It Must Be So"). He is then shanghaied by and into the Bulgar Army, which plots to "liberate" all of Westphalia. His escape attempt fails, and is recaptured by the Army. The Bulgar Army attacks Schloss Thunder-ten-Tronck and in the castle the Baron's family prays as the chorus joins in ("Westphalia"). However, the Baron, the Baroness, Maximilian, Paquette, Pangloss and (after being repeatedly ravished by the Bulgar Army) Cunegonde are all killed in the attack ("Battle Music"). Candide returns to the castle's ruins and searches for Cunegonde ("Candide's Lament").

Some time later, Candide becomes a beggar. He gives the last of his coins to Pangloss, who reveals that he was revived by an anatomist's scalpel. He then tells Candide of his syphilis condition brought on by Paquette ("Dear Boy"). A merchant offers the two employment before sailing off to Lisbon. However, as they arrive, a volcano erupts and the ensuing earthquake results in the death of 30,000 people. Pangloss and Candide are blamed for the disaster, arrested as heretics and publicly tortured by order of the Grand Inquisitor. Pangloss is hanged and Candide is flogged ("Auto-da-Fé"). Candide eventually ends up in Paris, where Cunegonde shares her favors (on different mutually-agreed-upon days of the week) with wealthy Jew Don Issachar and the city's Cardinal Archbishop ("The Paris Waltz"). She contemplates what she has done to survive while in Paris ("Glitter and Be Gay"). Candide finds Cunegonde and reunites with her ("You Were Dead, You Know"). However, the Old Lady, Cunegonde's companion, forewarns Cunegonde and Candide of Issachar and the Archbishop's arrival. Candide inadvertently kills both of them by stabbing them with a sword.

The three flee to Cádiz with Cunegonde's jewels, where the Old Lady tells Candide and Cunegonde about her past. The jewels are stolen and the Old Lady offers to sing for their dinner ("I Am Easily Assimilated"). The French police arrive, intending to arrest Candide for murdering Don Issachar and the Archbishop. Accepting an offer to fight for the Jesuits in South America, Candide decides to take Cunegonde and the Old Lady to the New World, and the three begin their journey on a ship ("Quartet Finale").

Act 2

In Buenos Aires, Maximilian and Paquette, now revived and disguised as slave girls, reunite. Soon after, Don Fernando d'Ibaraa y Figueroa y Mascarenes y Lampourdos y Souza, the governor of the city, falls in love with Maximilian, but quickly realizes his mistake and sells him to a priest. Meanwhile, Candide, Cunegonde and the Old Lady also arrive in Buenos Aires, where the Governor falls in love with Cunegonde ("My Love"). The Old Lady convinces Cunegonde that her marriage to the governor will support her financially ("We Are Women"). Candide soon befriends Cacambo and accepts him as his valet. Convinced by the Old Lady that the police are still after Candide for the Archbishop's murder, Candide and Cacambo flee to Montevideo but stumble upon a Jesuit camp and are joined by the Father and Mother Superiors ("The Pilgrims' Procession – Alleluia"). Candide soon discovers that the Mother Superior is actually Paquette and the Father Superior is Maximilian. When Candide tells Maximilian that he will marry Cunegonde, however, Maximilian angrily challenges him to a fight. However, Maximilian is once again inadvertently stabbed to death by Candide. Candide is forced to flee into the jungle as a result.

Three years later, Cunegonde and the Old Lady discuss the miseries shared by the upper classes while the Governor does not want to hear their complaints ("Quiet"). Meanwhile, Candide and Cacambo are starving and lost in the jungles. Finding a boat in the ocean, they float downriver into a cavern for 24 hours until they finally reach Eldorado, the city of gold ("Introduction to Eldorado"). The two discover that the locals worship one god as opposed to three, palaces of science, rosewater and stones with cinnamon and clove scents. Dissatisfied without Cunegonde, Candide decides to leave. The locals think him foolish, but offer to help, giving him some of the town's golden sheep and constructing a lift that will guide him, Cacambo and the sheep over the mountain ("The Ballad of Eldorado"). One by one, the sheep die until only two remain. Unwilling to go back to Montevideo, Candide gives Cacambo one of the golden sheep to ransom Cunegonde, telling them that they will meet again in Venice.

Arriving in Suriname, Candide meets Martin, a local pessimist. He shows him a slave with one hand and one foot lost while harvesting sugarcane, which is the result of Europeans eating sugar; Candide is unable to convince Martin otherwise ("Words, Words, Words"). Vanderdendur, a Dutch villain, offers his ship, the Santa Rosalia, in exchange for the golden sheep. Candide is excited when he is told that the Santa Rosalia is to depart for Venice. The locals and Vandendur wish Candide a safe journey to Venice ("Bon Voyage"). However, the ship sinks and Martin drowns as a result. After reuniting with his golden sheep, Candide is picked up by a galley, meeting five deposed kings. The galley is rowed by slaves, including Pangloss, revived once again. The kings say that they will live humbly, serving both god and men, and Pangloss leads their debate ("The Kings' Barcarolle").

The ship arrives in Venice, where the Carnival festival is taking place ("Money, Money, Money"). While the kings play roulette and baccarat, Candide searches for Cunegonde. Maximilian, revived once again, is now the corrupt Prefect of Police and the town's leader. Paquette is now the town's reigning prostitute. Cunegonde and the Old Lady are employed to encourage the gamblers ("What's the Use?"). Pangloss celebrates a victory after winning roulette and spends his money on the other ladies ("The Venice Gavotte"). Candide, however, masked for the Carnival, is accosted by Cunegonde and the Old Lady (both of whom are also masked), who try to swindle him out of his money. During the exchange, all the masks come off and they are horrified to recognize each other. Seeing what Cunegonde has become, Candide's image of and belief in her is shattered ("Nothing More Than This"). Candide does not speak for several days; with what little money they have left, they purchase a small farm outside Venice and the chorus says that life is just life and paradise is nothing ("Universal Good"). Candide finally speaks and resolves to marry Cunegonde ("Make Our Garden Grow").

== Music ==
Though the show as a whole received mixed reviews at its opening, the music was immediately a hit. Much of the score was recorded for a successful original cast album.

=== Overture ===
The overture to Candide soon earned a place in the orchestral repertoire. After a successful first concert performance on January 26, 1957, by the New York Philharmonic under the composer's baton, it quickly became popular and was performed by nearly 100 other orchestras within the next two years. Since that time, it has become one of the most frequently performed orchestral compositions by a 20th century American composer; in 1987, it was the most often performed piece of concert music by Bernstein.

The overture incorporates tunes from the songs "The Best of All Possible Worlds", "Battle Music", "Oh, Happy We", and "Glitter and Be Gay" and melodies composed specifically for the overture.

While many orchestrations of the overture exist, in its current incarnation for full symphony orchestra, which incorporates changes made by Bernstein during performances in December 1989, the piece requires a standard-sized contemporary orchestra of piccolo, two flutes, two oboes, an E♭ and two B♭ clarinets, bass clarinet, two bassoons, contrabassoon, four horns, two trumpets, three trombones, tuba, timpani, a large but standard percussion contingent, harp, and a standard string section. It is approximately four and a half minutes long. The theatre-sized orchestration, as in the published full score of the operetta, includes one flute doubling on piccolo, one oboe, two clarinets rotating between an E♭, B♭, and bass, one bassoon, two horns, two trumpets, two trombones, one tuba, standard orchestral percussion, harp, and strings. Main differences between the two are doublings and increased use of percussion effects (especially the addition of a drum roll during the opening fanfares) in the symphony orchestral arrangement. Differences between the first publication and later printings (of both orchestrations) include a slowed opening tempo (half note equal 132 instead of 152). An arrangement for standard wind ensemble also exists, composed by Clare Grundman in 1991, published under Boosey and Hawkes. Peter Richard Conte has also transcribed it for the Wanamaker Organ.

Dick Cavett used the "Glitter and Be Gay" portion of the overture at the midpoint of his ABC late-night TV show The Dick Cavett Show. The song also served as his signature introduction during the years the Cavett show aired on PBS.

At a memorial concert for Bernstein in 1990, the New York Philharmonic paid tribute to their Laureate Conductor by performing the overture without a conductor. This practice has become a performance tradition still maintained by the Philharmonic.

The New York Philharmonic performed the Overture to Candide as part of its historic concert in Pyongyang, North Korea, on February 26, 2008.

=== "Glitter and Be Gay" ===
Cunegonde's coloratura aria "Glitter and Be Gay" is a favourite showpiece for many sopranos. Barbara Cook's performance of the aria at its introduction impressed audience and critics, bringing her wide recognition.

This aria poses some difficulties. If sung as written throughout (alternative phrases are provided at several points in the score), there are three high E♭s (above high C), two staccato and one sustained; there are also numerous uses of high C and D♭. Some of the florid passages are very intricate. Theatrically, it demands an elaborate comic staging, in which Cunegonde adorns herself with jewelry while singing and dancing around the stage, and has a satirical quality that is a challenge to perform.

Subsequent performers of the role of Cunegonde have included:

- Mary Costa (in the 1959 London premiere)
- Mimi Coertse (in the 1963 Vienna premiere)
- Madeline Kahn (in a 1968 concert version)
- Maureen Brennan (In Hal Prince's first Broadway revival of the show in 1974)
- Erie Mills (at the New York City Opera in 1982)
- June Anderson (under Bernstein's direction in concerts and a 1989 recording shortly before his death)
- Constance Hauman (understudy to Anderson, filled in for at least one performance)
- Elizabeth Futral (at Lyric Opera of Chicago in 1994)
- Michael Callen (in his 1996 posthumously released LEGACY 2-CD album)
- Harolyn Blackwell (in Hal Prince's 1997 Broadway revival of the show).
- Kristin Chenoweth (in a 2004 concert production with the New York Philharmonic; recorded with many other orchestras including the Boston Pops)
- Lauren Molina (in Mary Zimmerman's 2010 production at the Goodman Theatre)
- Jessica Pratt (at Teatro dell'Opera di Roma in 2012)
- Scarlett Strallen (in the 2013 Menier Chocolate Factory production)

This aria has been performed in concert by many musical theatre and opera stars, including (in addition to those listed above): Natalie Dessay, Diana Damrau, Sumi Jo, Edita Gruberová, Renée Fleming, Simone Kermes, Roberta Peters, and Dawn Upshaw.

== Musical numbers ==
=== Original production (1956) ===
All music by Bernstein, and lyrics by Richard Wilbur unless noted otherwise

Act 1

- Overture – Orchestra

Scene 1: Westphalia

- Opening: The Best of All Possible Worlds – Dr. Pangloss, Chorus, Cunegonde, Candide
- Duet: Oh, Happy We – Candide and Cunegonde
- Chorus: Wedding Chorale – Chorus

Scene 1A: Candide Travels to Lisbon

- Meditation: It Must Be So – Candide

Scene 2: Lisbon

- Ensemble: Lisbon Sequence: Lisbon Fair / The Prediction / Dear Boy / The Inquisition: Auto-da-Fé* – Infant Casmira, Conjuror, Pangloss, The Inquisitors, and Chorus (Lyrics by Bernstein)
- Ensemble: Lisbon Sequence: Lisbon Fair / The Prediction / Pray For Us – Infant Casmira, Conjuror, and Chorus (Lyrics by Bernstein)

Scene 2A: Candide Travels to Paris

- Meditation: It Must Be Me – Candide

Scene 3: Paris

- Mazurka: The Paris Waltz – Orchestra
- Aria: Glitter and Be Gay – Cunegonde
- Duet: You Were Dead, You Know – Candide and Cunegonde (Lyrics by John Latouche and Wilbur)

Scene 3A: They Travel to Buenos Aires

- Ensemble: Pilgrims' Procession – Pilgrim Mother, Pilgrim Father, Cunegonde, Old Lady, Candide, Chorus
- Chorus: Alleluia – Pilgrims

Scene 4: Buenos Aires

- Serenade: My Love – Governor of Buenos Aires, Cunegonde, Old Lady (Lyrics by Latouche and Wilbur)
- Tango: I Am Easily Assimilated – Old Lady, Chorus, Cunegonde (Lyrics by Bernstein)
- Quartet: Finale act 1 – Candide, Cunegonde, Governor of Buenos Aires, Old Lady

Act 2

Entr'acte – Orchestra

Scene 1: Buenos Aires

- Trio: Quiet – Old Lady, Governor of Buenos Aires, Cunegonde
- Ballad: Eldorado – Candide, Chorus (Lyrics by Lillian Hellman)
- Schottische: Bon Voyage – Chorus, Governor of Buenos Aires

Scene 2: Venice

- Ensemble: Money, Money, Money (Venice Gambling Scene) – Croupier and Gamblers
- Waltz: What's the Use? – Madame Sofronia, Ferone, Prefect of Police, Prince Ivan, Chorus
- Gavotte: The Venice Gavotte – Madame Sofronia, Candide, Dr. Pangloss, Cunegonde (Lyrics by Dorothy Parker)

Scene 3: Westphalia

- Finale: Make Our Garden Grow – Candide, Cunegonde, Company

- This version of the "Lisbon Sequence" was rewritten after the Boston try-out; it removed the songs "Auto-da-Fé" and "Dear Boy", reinstated in most revivals.

=== 1973 production ===
- Life is Happiness Indeed – Candide, Cunegonde, Maximilian, Paquette
- The Best of All Possible Worlds – Pangloss, Candide, Cunegonde, Maximilian, Paquette
- Oh Happy We – Candide, Cunegonde
- It Must Be So – Candide
- O Miserere – Company
- Oh Happy We (reprise) – Candide, Cunegonde
- Glitter and Be Gay
- Auto da Fe (What A Day) – Company
- This World – Candide
- You Were Dead, You Know – Candide, Cunegonde
- I Am Easily Assimilated – Old Lady, 3 Dons
- I Am Easily Assimilated (reprise) – Old Lady, Candide, Cunegonde
- My Love – Governor, Maximilian
- Alleluia – Company
- Sheep Song – 2 Sheep, Lion, Paquette, Candide
- Bon Voyage – Governor and Company
- The Best of All Possible Worlds (reprise) – Old Lady, Candide, Paquette, 2 Sheep
- You Were Dead, You Know – Candide, Cunegonde
- Make Our Garden Grow – Company

- The 1973 revival had a couple of songs added (music by Bernstein and lyrics by Stephen Sondheim unless otherwise noted); "Life Is Happiness Indeed", "Auto Da Fe (What a Day)" (lyrics by Sondheim and Latouche), "This World", "The Sheep's Song", and "O Miserere".

=== 1982 production (NY City Opera House Version) ===
Act 1

- Overture
- Life Is Happiness, Indeed
- Parade
- The Best of All Possible Worlds
- Oh, Happy We
- Candide Begins His Travels
- It Must Be So
- Westphalian Fanfare, Chorale and Battle Music
- Transition Music (Entrance of The Jew)
- Glitter and Be Gay
- Earthquake Music
- Dear Boy
- Auto-da-Fé (What a day)
- Candide's Lament
- You Were Dead, You Know
- Travel ("To the stables")
- I Am Easily Assimilated
- I Am Easily Assimilated Reprise
- Quartet Finale

Act 2

- Entr'acte and Ballad of the New World
- My Love
- Barcarolle (The Old Lady's Tale)
- Alleluia
- Eldorado Underscore
- Sheep's Song
- Governor's Waltz
- Bon Voyage — Schottische
- Quiet
- The Best of All Possible Worlds Reprise
- What's the Use?
- You Were Dead, You Know Reprise
- Barcarolle Reprise
- Finale: Make Our Garden Grow

=== 1989 production ===
Bernstein's "final revised version", recorded in 1989:

Act 1

- Overture
- Westphalia Chorale
- Life Is Happiness Indeed
- The Best of All Possible Worlds
- Universal Good
- Oh, Happy We
- It Must Be So (Candide's Meditation)
- Westphalia
- Battle Music (Mazurka)
- Candide's Lament
- Dear Boy
- Auto-da-Fé (What a day)
- Candide Begins His Travels; It Must Be Me (2nd Meditation)
- The Paris Waltz
- Glitter and Be Gay
- You Were Dead, You Know
- I Am Easily Assimilated (Old Lady's Tango)
- Quartet Finale

Act 2

- Entr'acte
- Universal Good
- My Love
- We Are Women
- The Pilgrim's Procession – Alleluia
- Quiet
- Introduction To Eldorado
- The Ballad Of Eldorado
- Words, Words, Words (Martin's Laughing Song)
- Bon Voyage
- The Kings' Barcarolle
- Money, Money, Money
- What's the Use?
- The Venice Gavotte
- Nothing More Than This
- Universal Good
- Make Our Garden Grow

== Awards and nominations ==
=== Original Broadway production ===
Year	Award	Category	Nominee	Result
1957	Tony Award	Best Musical		Nominated
1957	Tony Award	Best Performance by a Featured Actress in a Musical	Irra Petina	Nominated
1957	Tony Award	Best Conductor and Musical Director	Samuel Krachmalnick	Nominated
1957	Tony Award	Best Scenic Design	Oliver Smith	Nominated
1957	Tony Award	Best Costume Design	Irene Sharaff	Nominated

=== 1973 Broadway revival ===
Year	Award	Category	Nominee	Result
1974	Tony Award	Best Book of a Musical	Hugh Wheeler	Won
1974	Tony Award	Best Performance by a Leading Actor in a Musical	Lewis J. Stadlen	Nominated
1974	Tony Award	Best Performance by a Featured Actor in a Musical	Mark Baker	Nominated
1974	Tony Award	Best Performance by a Featured Actress in a Musical	Maureen Brennan	Nominated
1974	Tony Award	Best Performance by a Featured Actress in a Musical	June Gable	Nominated
1974	Tony Award	Best Direction of a Musical	Harold Prince	Won
1974	Tony Award	Best Scenic Design	Franne Lee and Eugene Lee	Won
1974	Tony Award	Best Costume Design	Franne Lee	Won
1974	Drama Desk Award	Outstanding Book of a Musical	Hugh Wheeler	Won
1974	Drama Desk Award	Outstanding Director	Harold Prince	Won
1974	Drama Desk Award	Outstanding Choreography	Patricia Birch	Won
1974	Drama Desk Award	Outstanding Set Design	Franne Lee and Eugene Lee	Won
1974	Drama Desk Award	Outstanding Costume Design	Franne Lee	Won
1974	New York Drama Critics' Circle Award	Best Musical	Leonard Bernstein, Richard Wilbur, Hugh Wheeler and John La Touche	Won

=== 1988 Old Vic production ===
Year	Award	Category	Nominee	Result
1988	Laurence Olivier Award	Musical of the Year		Won
1988	Laurence Olivier Award	Designer of the Year	Richard Hudson (for his season at the Old Vic)	Won
1988	Laurence Olivier Award	Laurence Olivier Award for Best Actress in a Musical	Patricia Routledge	Won
1988	Laurence Olivier Award	Laurence Olivier Award for Best Actor in a Musical	Nickolas Grace	Nominated

=== 1997 Broadway revival ===
Year	Award	Category	Nominee	Result
1997	Tony Award	Best Revival of a Musical		Nominated
1997	Tony Award	Best Performance by a Leading Actor in a Musical	Jim Dale	Nominated
1997	Tony Award	Best Performance by a Featured Actress in a Musical	Andrea Martin	Nominated
1997	Tony Award	Best Costume Design	Judith Dolan	Won
1997	Drama Desk Award	Outstanding Revival of a Musical		Nominated
1997	Drama Desk Award	Outstanding Actor in a Musical	Jim Dale	Nominated
1997	Drama Desk Award	Outstanding Actor in a Musical	Jason Danieley	Nominated
1997	Drama Desk Award	Outstanding Featured Actress in a Musical	Andrea Martin	Nominated
1997	Drama Desk Award	Outstanding Set Design	Clarke Dunham	Nominated

=== 1999 National Theatre London production ===
Year	Award	Category	Nominee	Result
2000	Laurence Olivier Award	Best Musical Revival		Won
2000	Laurence Olivier Award	Best Actor in a Musical	Simon Russell Beale	Won
2000	Laurence Olivier Award	Best Actor in a Musical	Daniel Evans	Nominated
2000	Laurence Olivier Award	Best Performance in a Supporting Role in a Musical	Denis Quilley	Nominated
2000	Laurence Olivier Award	Best Theatre Choreographer	Peter Darling	Nominated
2000	Laurence Olivier Award	Best Costume Design	Elise and John Napier	Nominated
