= Keith Raywood =

American production designer

Keith Ian Raywood is an American production designer best known as Art Director for Saturday Night Live (SNL) since 1985 and Production Designer for SNL since 1990. He has designed music videos and live performances for major recording artists, international and national commercial spots, MSG & MSG+ networks, and theatre productions both regional and in New York.

== Early life and education ==
Raywood was born in New York City, and lived between there and Miami Beach throughout his childhood. He attended The Dwight School, and studied painting at The Art Students League of New York with Issac Soyer.

In 1975, while enrolled at Cornell University for painting, he switched to architecture at the end of his freshman year, and then left for London to study at The Architectural Association School of Architecture. While there, he joined the unit that was tutored by renowned architects Bernard Tschumi and Nigel Coates.

In the spring of 1978, he traveled with a group of students led by Rem Koolhaas to the Soviet Union. Raywood credits his time at The AA as most inspiring and influential in his work, and it would later greatly inform his process, aesthetic, and "architectural" style as a production designer.

In 1979, he returned to Cornell's College of Architecture. While there, he formed the band Symbols, which released two EPs, and regularly performed in New York City clubs like CBGB's, Tramps, Danceteria, and Max's Kansas City.

== Career ==
Shortly after moving back to New York City in 1982, Raywood became the assistant to Eugene Lee on the film Easy Money. He worked as Lee's assistant and art director for the next three years on Lee's film, television, and theatre projects, eventually designing his own sets for music videos, commercials, television, and theatre. In 1985, he co-designed, with Lee, the original production of The Normal Heart at The Public Theater.

Raywood became the art director of Saturday Night Live in 1985, and has been credited as one of its production designers since 1990. As of 2022, he has been with show for more than thirty-seven seasons. That same year, he co-designed the Saturday Night Live 40th Anniversary Special. He has collaborated many times with current and former SNL performers and writers on a variety of projects, including Lip Sync Battle, The Tonight Show with Jimmy Fallon, 30 Rock, Late Night with Conan O'Brien, and Tracy Morgan: Black and Blue.

He has designed numerous music specials and television series for MTV, VH1, NBC, HBO, BET, Fuse, Comedy Central, and Spike TV. His credits include The 66th Primetime Emmy Awards; the 1994, 1996, 1997, 1998, 2001, and 2008 MTV Video Music Awards; the 2016 MTV Movie Awards; "The Eagles: Hell Freezes Over"; The American Comedy Awards in 2011,2012 & 2014; VH1's Hip Hop Honors; Don Rickles: One Night Only; Alec Baldwin: One Night Only; Divas Live for VH1; the 2007 Spike TV Video Game Awards; and VH1 Rock Honors: The Who, as well as several of the combined upfront for MTV Networks.

He has designed the Spike Guys' Choice Awards five times. Other television credits include The Marriage Ref, Russell Simmons Presents Def Poetry & Def Comedy Jam, and The Concert For New York City which broadcast live from Madison Square Garden one month after the September 11, 2001 attacks, for which he received an Emmy nomination.

In 2007, Raywood created several architectural designs for video art installations in collaboration with artist-director-photographer Michael Somoroff. Their first installation, Illumination, opened at the BravinLee gallery.

He designed the studios for the Fuse and MSG networks at 11 Penn Plaza in 2010.

== Awards ==
Raywood has received 9 Primetime Emmy Awards in the Outstanding Art Direction for a Variety, Music, or Non-fiction Programming category. The first in 2009 for his work on the 2008 MTV Video Music Awards, and the second as part of the art department at Saturday Night Live in 2013, the first time in 38 seasons that SNL had received an Emmy in an Art Direction category.

In 2012, he also received an Emmy nomination for 30 Rock. In 2010, 2011, 2012, and 2013, he received another four Emmy nominations for Saturday Night Live, totaling seven nominations as part of the show's art department. In 2002, he was nominated in the same category for The Concert for New York City.

Raywood has received two first place Promax Broadcast Design Awards for his work on 2008's and 2012's Spike Guys' Choice Awards.

In 2009, Raywood was nominated for three Art Directors Guild Awards for his 2008 designs of Saturday Night Live, 30 Rock, and the MTV Video Music Awards. He was again nominated by the Guild for 30 Rock and SNL in 2010 and 2011, and received an Award for the Betty White/Jay-Z episode (2010) of SNL in 2011.

Considering its longevity and influence, this was the first time Saturday Night Live had received a design award of any kind in its then 36 seasons on NBC. In 2012 and 2013, Raywood again won the ADG as part of the SNL team, respectively, for a 2011 episode with Justin Timberlake / Lady Gaga, and the 2012 Season Finale with host and musical guest Mick Jagger. In total, Raywood has received 6 ADG awards and 25 nominations.

== Partial Credit List ==
Title	Year
Saturday Night Live	1985-Current
Lip Sync Battle	2015
The 66th Primetime Emmy Awards	2014
Spike Guys' Choice Awards	2008, 2010-2014
American Comedy Awards	2014
Don Rickles: One Night Only (Spike TV)	2014
30 Rock	2006-2012
The Comedy Awards	2011-2012
Eddie Murphy: One Night Only (Spike TV)	2011
Talking Funny (HBO)	2011
The Marriage Ref	2010-2011
Tracy Morgan: Black and Blue (HBO)	2010
VH1 Storytellers (Foo Fighters, Mary J. Blige, Jay-Z)	2007-2009
MTV Video Music Awards	1994, 1996–1998, 2001, 2008
Def Poetry Jam	2002-2007
106 & Park	2004-2007
Hip Hop Honors	2004-2005
NBC 75th Anniversary Special	2002
Zoolander (Fashion Awards segment)	2001
VH1/Vogue Fashion Awards	1999-2000
VH1 Divas	1998-2000
Hard Rock Live	1997
Late Night with Conan O'Brien	1993-1996
The Eagles Hell Freezes Over	1994
The Kids in the Hall	1988-1990
