= The Muppet Show (2026 TV special) =

2026 American variety sketch comedy television special

- Release poster
- Genre: Sketch comedy; Variety show; Surreal humor; Slapstick
- Based on: Disney's Muppet properties and characters
- Written by: Albertina Rizzo; Gabe Liedman; Nedaa Sweiss; Kelly Younger; Andrew Williams
- Directed by: Alex Timbers
- Starring: Bill Barretta; Dave Goelz; Eric Jacobson; Peter Linz; David Rudman; Matt Vogel; Sabrina Carpenter; Maya Rudolph; Seth Rogen
- Theme music composer: Jim Henson; Sam Pottle
- Opening theme: "The Muppet Show Theme"
- Composers: Bill Sherman; Zach Marsh; Derek Scott (Gonzo's fanfare and Muppet Labs theme, uncredited)
- Country of origin: United States
- Original language: English

Production
- Executive producers: David Lightbody; Leigh Slaughter; Michael Steinbach; Seth Rogen; Evan Goldberg; James Weaver; Alex McAtee; Matt Vogel; Eric Jacobson; Albertina Rizzo; Alex Timbers; Sabrina Carpenter
- Producer: Dani Iglesias
- Production locations: Fox Studio Lot; Los Angeles, California
- Running time: 32 minutes
- Production companies: The Muppets Studio; Point Grey Pictures; 20th Television

Original release
- Network: Disney+; ABC
- Release: February 4, 2026

The Muppet Show is a 2026 American variety sketch comedy television special starring the Muppets. It is presented as a revival of the original Muppet Show series (1976–1981) created by Jim Henson, featuring recurring sketches and musical numbers interspersed with ongoing plotlines with running gags taking place backstage and in other areas of the venue. The special stars Muppet performers Bill Barretta, Dave Goelz, Eric Jacobson, Peter Linz, David Rudman and Matt Vogel, and features singer and actress Sabrina Carpenter as the special guest, with additional guest appearances by actress and comedian Maya Rudolph and actor and comedian Seth Rogen. Vogel, Jacobson, Rogen and Carpenter also serve as executive producers. It was produced by The Muppets Studio, Point Grey Pictures and 20th Television, and premiered on Disney+ and ABC on February 4, 2026.

The Muppet Show revives the original show's tone with slapstick, absurdist, and surreal humor. Within its context, Kermit the Frog (performed by Vogel) acts as showrunner and host, who tries to maintain control of the overwhelming antics of the other Muppet characters and appease the guest stars. It serves as a backdoor pilot to a potential full revival of the series. This was the first Muppets production to be produced by 20th Television and Disney Branded Television after ABC Signature folded into 20th Television on October 1, 2024.

It received widespread praise from critics and received 7.58 million viewers in its first eight days across Disney+ and ABC.

== Plot ==
The special opens in a dark, empty Muppet Theatre as Rowlf plays "Rainbow Connection" on piano. Beauregard dusts the hallway and Kermit arrives, turning on the lights and reflecting on the show’s history before realizing it is time to start again. Scooter prepares the evening's guest star, Sabrina Carpenter, but Miss Piggy is dressed the same as her, sparking tension.

After the opening theme, Sabrina kicks off the show with a performance of "Manchild" set in a rowdy bar run by Sam Eagle and populated by unruly Frackles and dancing chickens.

Backstage, Kermit quickly discovers the production is overcrowded because Scooter approved nearly every act out of politeness. Scooter presents an impossibly long schedule and Kermit scrambles to cut segments. Fozzie offers to help and cuts executive producer Seth Rogen instead while Miss Piggy insists on keeping her two lavish numbers, including an over-the-top historical musical spectacle, ignoring Kermit's concerns about time.

Gonzo attempts a deadly roller-skating obstacle course while reciting the names of every Academy Award winner for Best Supporting Actress, only to immediately crash and continue bursting into scenes throughout the episode mid-recitation.

A "Pigs in Wigs" ballroom sketch centers on Piggy juggling romantic suitors before her wig gets caught in a chandelier and Pepé replaces her paramour, humiliating her as Statler and Waldorf prepare tomatoes to throw.

Rizzo and the rats perform "Blinding Lights" on a city street set, but Beauregard accidentally shorts out the lighting system, plunging the number into chaos.

At Muppet Labs, Dr. Bunsen Honeydew unveils "Focus Pocus," a concentration serum that causes Beaker's eyeballs to pop out and multiply uncontrollably, later pelting the audience.

In the crowd, Maya Rudolph chats obliviously with Beautiful Day Monster until one of the eyeballs gets stuck in her throat. She is later mistakenly reported dead in a Muppet News Flash and seen on a stretcher before reviving when a sandbag knocks the obstruction from her throat.

Meanwhile, Sabrina bonds with Kermit and reveals she idolizes Miss Piggy. Piggy storms in, knocking the dressing room door down on Kermit, furious that her big number has been cut. Sabrina's flattery softens Piggy's anger, and the two reconcile. Later, Kermit and Sabrina perform "Islands in the Stream" in a swamp-set duet, only for Piggy to interrupt and replace Kermit as her duet partner.

As backstage pressure mounts and the cast clamors for stage time, Kermit becomes overwhelmed trying to choose a final act. Rather than cut anyone else, he decides to abandon the planned finale and instead leads the entire troupe in an impromptu ensemble performance of "Don't Stop Me Now." One by one, the rest of the Muppets join in. In the closing moments, Kermit thanks Sabrina, who jokes that they fit in together because they are the same height. Seth grumbles from the audience about being cut, and Gonzo continues roller-skating while shouting out the names of Academy Award winners.

== Cast ==
=== Special guest star ===
- Sabrina Carpenter

=== Guest starring ===
- Seth Rogen
- Maya Rudolph

=== Muppet performers ===
- Bill Barretta as Rowlf the Dog, Dr. Teeth, Swedish Chef, Pepe the King Prawn
- Dave Goelz as Gonzo, Zoot, Waldorf, Dr. Bunsen Honeydew
- Eric Jacobson as Miss Piggy, Fozzie Bear, Animal, Sam Eagle
- Peter Linz as Lips, Statler
- David Rudman as Scooter, Janice, Beaker
- Matt Vogel as Kermit the Frog, Sgt. Floyd Pepper

==== Guest starring Muppet performers ====
- Stephanie D'Abruzzo
- Ryan Dillon
- Alice Dinnean
- Bradley Freeman, Jr.

==== Supporting Muppet performers ====
- Jennifer Barnhart
- Jackson Barretta
- David Bizzaro
- Jordan Brownlee
- Tyler Bunch
- Kevin Carlson
- Leslie Carrara-Rudolph
- John Cody
- Frankie Cordero
- Peggy Etra
- Alex "Jurgen" Ferguson
- Dan Garza
- Haley Jenkins
- Tim Lagasse
- B Lanoil
- Amanda Maddock
- Drew Massey
- Paul McGinnis
- James Murray
- Sarah Sarang Oh
- Michael Oosterom
- Martin P. Robinson
- Nicolette Santino
- Stoph Scheer
- Michelan Sisti
- Colleen Smith
- John Tartaglia
- Allan Trautman
- Art Vega
- Russ Walko
- Stacey Weingarten

== Production ==
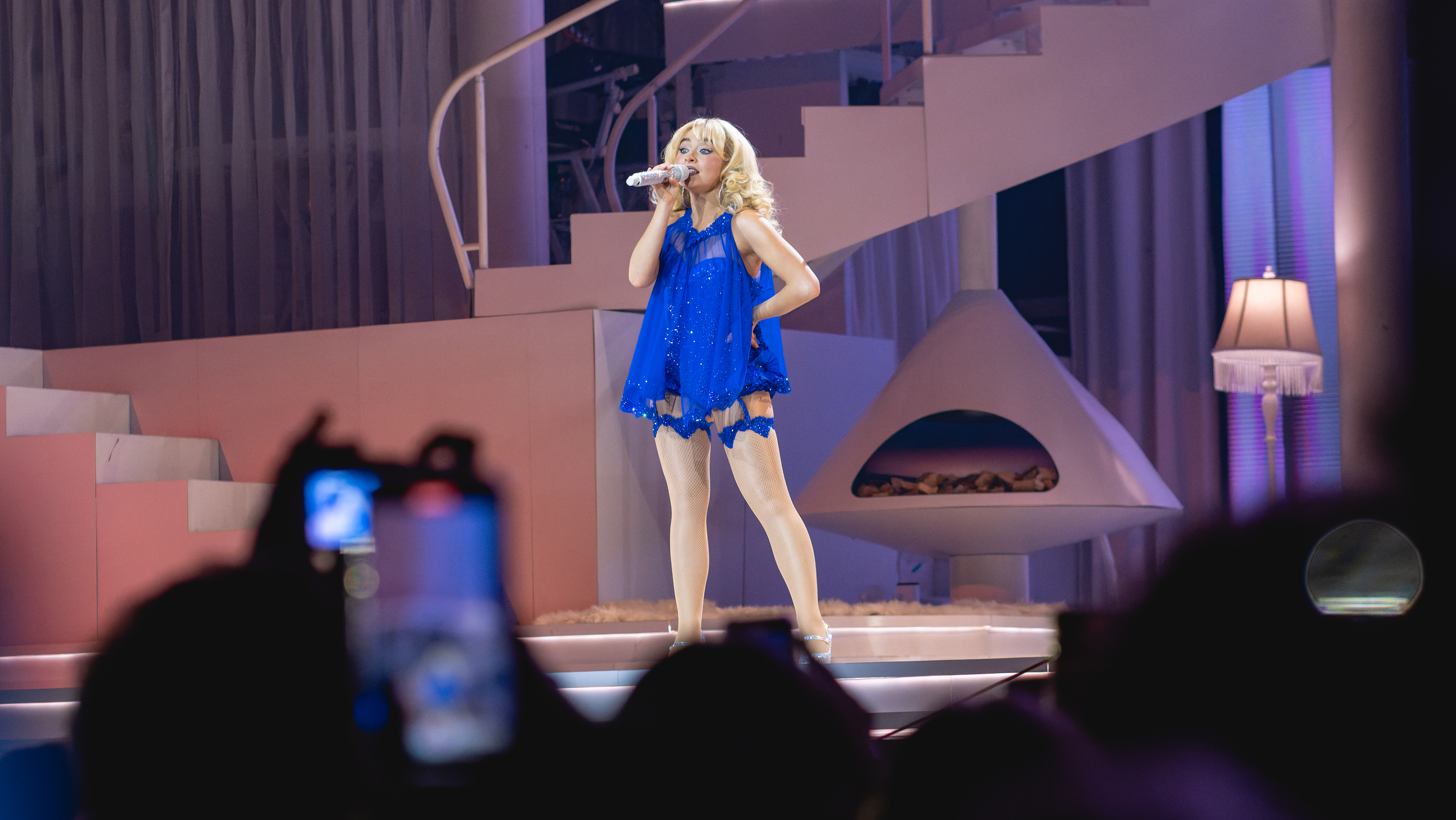
Sabrina Carpenter, pictured in 2025, the special's main guest star.

In September 2025, Disney announced that an untitled "event special" for The Muppet Show was being produced for Disney+, to premiere on February 4, 2026, to coincide with the show's 50th anniversary. The special is described as "Kermit the Frog, Miss Piggy, Fozzie Bear, Gonzo and the gang as they return to the Muppet Theatre to produce a variety show." The special stars Muppet performers Bill Barretta, Dave Goelz, Eric Jacobson, Peter Linz, David Rudman and Matt Vogel performing the majority of the Muppet characters, alongside a supporting cast of additional performers; Goelz reprises most of the same character roles he originated during the show's original 1976–1981 run. The special was directed by Alex Timbers and feature special guest stars Sabrina Carpenter, Maya Rudolph and Seth Rogen. In addition, Carpenter and Rogen also served as executive producers alongside Evan Goldberg, Vogel, Jacobson, David Lightbody, Leigh Slaughter, Michael Steinbach, Albertina Rizzo, James Weaver and Alex McAtee.

The special was co-produced by 20th Television, Disney Branded Television, The Muppets Studio, and Point Grey Pictures.

== Marketing ==
In December 2025, a premiere date was set for February 4, 2026. A teaser was released on January 2, 2026. A trailer was released on January 23, 2026, announcing Maya Rudolph as an additional guest star in addition to the previously announced Sabrina Carpenter and Seth Rogen.

== Reception ==
=== Critical response ===
On the review aggregator website Rotten Tomatoes, 98% of 58 critics' reviews are positive, with an average rating of 8.2/10. The website's consensus reads: "It's time to play the music, it's time to light the lights -- this spirited return to The Muppet Show's roots is clever, earnest, and feels exactly right." Metacritic, which uses a weighted average, assigned the film a score of 81 out of 100, based on 22 critics, indicating "univeral acclaim".

James Poniewozik of The New York Times praised the Muppets' return to form, writing, "The Muppet Show, it turns out, doesn't need to be retooled for a new era, because the Muppets exist outside of time. These are, in fact, your grandparents' Muppets, and your parents'. And yet they're exactly the Muppets you need right now." Judy Berman of Time magazine felt the special "recaptures both the format and the soul of the '70s original [...] Every beloved character is back. The revival is so satisfying that I only have one complaint: There's too little of it."

Brian Tallerico of RogerEbert.com felt Sabrina Carpenter "proves a great fit for the first episode, finding that charm she's employed on TV before—she's great on SNL—and employing it well here." In summary, he felt the 2026 special "understands why people still love the original." Daniel Fienberg of The Hollywood Reporter felt the "punchlines feel like first-draft jokes in desperate need of refinement"; nevertheless, he summarized: "This is not The Muppet Show at its best, but it's a return to what the Muppets do best." Tara Bennett of IGN praised the Muppet performers and the writers for "honoring the past with faithful sketch revivals and character temperaments while making this episode feel fresh and genuinely funny."

Robert Lloyd of the Los Angeles Times wrote he was "largely satisfied and often delighted" with the special; in conclusion, he noted: "Sentiment is consistent with the Muppets gestalt, but not really part of The Muppet Show. But I will excuse it, and hope they return with more." Lili Loofbourow of The Washington Post described the special as "mediocre", in which she noted it failed "to introduce itself to new audiences." She further criticized Matt Vogel's performance as Kermit, and concluded "The Muppet Show has never been about being great. It's been about feeling good. And on that front, boy, does this silly little special deliver."

=== Viewership ===
On ABC, The Muppet Show averaged a 0.52 rating in the 18–49 demographic with a 7 share and was viewed by 3.07 million people. Across multiple platforms, the special accumulated 7.58 million viewers. Luminate, which measures streaming performance in the United States using viewership data, audience engagement metrics, and content reach across multiple platforms, announced that The Muppet Show generated 3.8 million views during the first half of 2026.

=== Accolades ===
Award	Date of ceremony	Category	Recipient(s)	Result	Ref.
Astra TV Awards	August 15, 2026	Best Standup or Variety Special	The Muppet Show	Won	
Dorian TV Awards	August 15, 2026	Best TV Musical Performance	Sabrina Carpenter and The Muppets (for "Manchild")	Nominated	
Dorian TV Awards	August 15, 2026	Best TV Musical Performance	Sabrina Carpenter, Kermit the Frog, and Miss Piggy (for "Islands in the Stream")	Nominated	
MacGuffin Awards	September 12, 2026	Variety, Reality, Game Show, or Television Special	Theresa Corvino	Won	
Primetime Creative Arts Emmy Awards	September 5–6, 2026	Outstanding Variety Special (Pre-Recorded)	David Lightbody, Leigh Slaughter, Michael Steinbach, Seth Rogen, Evan Goldberg, James Weaver, Alex McAtee, Matt Vogel, Eric Jacobson, Albertina Rizzo, Alex Timbers, Sabrina Carpenter, Ryan Janata, and Dani Iglesias	Won	
Primetime Creative Arts Emmy Awards	September 5–6, 2026	Outstanding Character Voice-Over Performance	Matt Vogel (as Kermit the Frog)	Nominated	
Primetime Creative Arts Emmy Awards	September 5–6, 2026	Outstanding Writing for a Variety Special	Albertina Rizzo, Gabe Liedman, Nedaa Sweiss, Kelly Younger, and Andrew Williams	Won	
Primetime Creative Arts Emmy Awards	September 5–6, 2026	Outstanding Picture Editing for a Variety Special	Kelly Lyon	Won	
Primetime Creative Arts Emmy Awards	September 5–6, 2026	Outstanding Production Design for a Variety Special	Denise Pizzini, Chet Maxwell, Robert Aguirre, and Bethany Barton	Won	
Primetime Creative Arts Emmy Awards	September 5–6, 2026	Outstanding Sound Mixing for a Variety Series or Special	John Chamberlin, Sean Madsen, Christopher Neely, Jordan McClain, Sanaa Kelley, Sam Sgriccia, and David Michel-Rudy	Nominated	
Set Decorators Society of America TV Awards	August 9, 2026	Best Achievement in Décor/Design of a Variety, Reality or Competition Series, or Special	Bethany Barton and Denise Pizzini	Won	
TCA Awards	August 20, 2026	Outstanding Achievement in Variety, Talk or Sketch	The Muppet Show: Sabrina Carpenter	Nominated	

== Future ==
In September 2026, Deadline Hollywood reported that despite the special having good ratings and winning four Emmys, future installments of the show were not in active development due to "difficulties cracking a premise [...] that [all the production companies] will be on board for." However, it also reported change could be possible.
