= E. Jay Krause =

American art director and production designer

- Born: April 24, 1926; Los Angeles, California, U.S.
- Died: April 12, 2025 (aged 98); Los Angeles, California U.S.
- Occupation(s): Art director, production designer

E. Jay Krause (April 24, 1926 – April 12, 2025) was an American art director and production designer. He won two Primetime Emmy Awards in the category Outstanding Art Direction.

Krause died on April 12, 2025, in Los Angeles, California, at the age of 98.
