= Franne Lee =

American costume designer (1941–2023)

- Born: Frances Elaine Newman; December 30, 1941; The Bronx, New York City, U.S.
- Died: August 27, 2023 (aged 81); Atlantis, Florida, U.S.
- Occupation(s): Costume and production designer
- Notable work: Saturday Night Live
- Partner: Eugene Lee (1970s)

Frances Elaine Newman (December 30, 1941 – August 27, 2023), known professionally as Franne Lee, was an American costume and production designer for stage, television, and film. She won multiple Tony Awards and Drama Desk Awards.

Lee dated set designer Eugene Lee during the 1970s, and the couple had a son together. While the couple never married, she adopted his last name. The two collaborated on productions including Candide, directed by Harold Prince at the Chelsea Theater Center in Brooklyn in 1973. They shared the 1974 Tony Award for best scenic design, and Lee won a second Tony Award for Best Costume Design. She would later win another Tony Award for costume design in 1979 for her costume designs, for her work on the original Broadway production of Sweeney Todd.

On television, Franne was the original costume designer for Saturday Night Live, and designed the costumes for characters such as the Coneheads, the Killer Bees, and Roseanne Roseannadanna. She left the show in 1980.

Franne Lee died in Atlantis, Florida on August 27, 2023, at the age of 81.
