= Property Masters Guild =

Organization for property masters

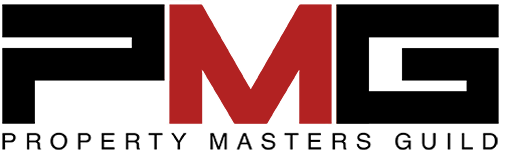
- Abbreviation: PMG
- Founded: November 2021
- Founders: Gregg Bilson; Chris Call; Joshua Meltzer; Hope Parrish
- Location: United States
- Members: 200+ (2023)
- President: Jeffrey Johnson
- Website: propertymastersguild.org

The Property Masters Guild (PMG) is a 501(c)(3) non-profit organization of professional property masters working in film, television, commercials, and theatrical productions. The PMG was founded in November 2021 by property masters Gregg Bilson, Chris Call, Joshua Meltzer, and Hope Parrish. Meltzer was the first president of the guild, which started with 78 founding members. It sought to raise awareness of the role of property managers and ensure its members maintained high quality standards to inspire future workers.

The guild was one of many founded in the early 2020s amidst the impact of the COVID-19 pandemic on film and television, as well as the Rust shooting incident, which did not directly influence the guild's creation but, according to the organizers, reinforced its necessity. The founders conceived the idea for the guild in 2017 and met with property masters several times over the following years to organize the group. It had over 200 members by December 2023. The guild consulted with the Academy of Television Arts & Sciences to create a property masters subgroup within the Academy's Directors Peer Group in 2026.

== MacGuffin Awards ==
The PMG's MacGuffin Awards honor the work of property masters in film and television, the only awards show focused on doing so.

=== 1st (2024) ===
Originally planned for May 2022, the PMG's inaugural MacGuffin Awards were first held at the Belasco Theater on September 14, 2024. The nominees were announced on July 23, 2024. Emily Ferry received the Lifetime Achievement Award, while Russell Bobbitt was awarded the Humanitarian Award.

Contemporary Feature Film: Mission: Impossible – Dead Reckoning Part One – David Cheesman ‡; American Fiction – Lily Raih; The Killer – James Lyman Eddy; Knock at the Cabin – Robbie Duncan; Knox Goes Away – Joshua Meltzer	Period Feature Film: Oppenheimer – Guillaume Delouche ‡; Asteroid City – Sandy Hamilton; The Holdovers – Pete Dancy; Napoleon – Joshua Polley; Saltburn – P.R. Smith
Fantasy / Science Fiction Feature Film: Poor Things – Balazs M. Kovacs ‡; Barbie – Steven Morris; Guardians of the Galaxy Vol. 3 – Russell Bobbitt; Rebel Moon – Part One: A Child of Fire – Brad Elliott; Wonka – Jamie Wilkinson	Half-Hour Multi-Camera Television Series: That '90s Show – Julie Heuer ‡; Frasier – Julie Heuer; iCarly – Kim Bolanowski; Lopez vs Lopez – Charles Faithorn and Jim Falkenstein; Night Court – Jeremy Armstrong
Half-Hour Single Camera Television Series: The Bear – Laura Roeper ‡; Abbott Elementary – James "Skip" Torvinen; Beef – Rose Leiker; The Muppets Mayhem – Bethany Barton; Ted Lasso – Simon Drew	One-Hour Contemporary Television Series: Tom Clancy's Jack Ryan – Jeffrey Johnson ‡; Bel-Air – Chuck Askerneese; Fargo – Justin Onofriechuk; The Lincoln Lawyer – Holiday Landa; The Righteous Gemstones – Mick Flowers
One-Hour Period Television Series: Perry Mason – Brad Einhorn ‡; 1923 – Ian Roylance; The Crown – Owen Harrison; Physical – Parker Swanson; Winning Time: The Rise of the Lakers Dynasty – Chris Call	One-Hour Fantasy / Science Fiction Television Series: The Last of Us – Justin Onofriechuk ‡; Ahsoka – Josh Roth; Star Trek: Picard – Jeffrey Lombardi; Star Trek: Strange New Worlds – Jim Murray; Sweet Tooth – Elise Kowitz
Television Mini-Series: Lessons in Chemistry – Jode Man ‡; A Murder at the End of the World – Catherine Miller; The Fall of the House of Usher – Lynda Chapple; Ghosts of Beirut – Andrew O. Page; Lawmen: Bass Reeves – Ira A. McAliley	Variety, Reality, Game Show, or Event Special: A Black Lady Sketch Show – Todd Daniels ‡; Hell's Kitchen: The American Dream – Randy Taylor; History of the World, Part II – Laura Fejes; Snake Oil – Ben Brecher; Whose Line Is It Anyway? – Angelo O'Neill
Short Form: Commercials, Web Series, and Music Videos: Feeding Time: A Tale from Jack in the Box (Jack in the Box) – Brad Elliott ‡; Neverending Fan (VISA) – Christopher Wright; Peloton. Anyone. Anywhere (Peloton) – Mellanie Urquiza; "Kill Bill" music video (SZA) – Hannah Olsen; Taco Bell x Paris Hilton: The Volcano Menu is Back (Taco Bell) – Lauren Melody Shell

=== 2nd (2025) ===
The 2nd MacGuffin Awards were held on September 13, 2025, at the Paramount Theater. The nominees were announced on August 7. Alfonso Ramirez won the inaugural President's Award, while Dennis J. Parrish won the Lifetime Achievement Award, and Chuck McSorley won the Humanitarian Award. Michael Jortner won two awards at the show: Period Film for A Complete Unknown and Fantasy / Science Fiction Television Series (with Peter Gelfman) for Fallout.

Contemporary Feature Film: Heretic – Dean Goodine ‡; Anora – Kendra Eaves; Beverly Hills Cop: Axel F – Robbie Duncan; Challengers – Matt Marks and Mike Drury; The Neon Highway – Hunter Nelson	Period Feature Film: A Complete Unknown – Michael Jortner ‡; Joker: Folie à Deux – J.P. Jones; I'm Still Here – Laura Shalders; Saturday Night – Mychael Bates; The Six Triple Eight – Elliott Boswell
Fantasy / Science Fiction Feature Film: Dune: Part Two – Douglas Harlocker ‡; Furiosa: A Mad Max Saga – Joanna Pullen; Rebel Moon – Chapter Two: Curse of Forgiveness – Brad Elliott; Red One – Andrew M. Siegel; Wicked – Jamie Wilkinson	One-Hour Contemporary Television Series: Severance – Catherine Miller ‡; Grotesquerie – Cameron Lowande; The Handmaid's Tale – Mary Arthurs; Mayor of Kingstown – Michael A. Sabo; The Righteous Gemstones – Mick Flowers, Timothy Sheehan, and Melissa Wooten
One-Hour Period Television Series: Shōgun – Dean Eilertson ‡; 1923 – Ian Roylance; Bridgerton – Kez Keyte; Dexter: Original Sin – James Lyman Eddy; Palm Royale – Parker Swanson	One-Hour Fantasy / Science Fiction Television Series: Fallout – Michael Jortner and Peter Gelfman ‡; Interview with the Vampire – Ellen Freund; The Last of Us – Nevin Swain; Percy Jackson and the Olympians – Michelle Hendriksen and Dean Goodine; The Umbrella Academy – Emily Hide
Half-Hour Single-Camera Television Series: The Studio – Andrew M. Siegel ‡; The Bear – Laura Roeper; Deli Boys – Colin Bach; Government Cheese – Nicole Ruby; Ted – John Harrington	Half-Hour Multi-Camera Television Series: Wizards Beyond Waverly Place – Lindsay Tomlinson Forrest ‡; Danger Force – Mark Kelly; Frasier – Julie A. Heuer; Happy's Place – Julie A. Heuer; That '90s Show – Julie A. Heuer
Television Mini-Series: Ripley – David Gulick and Antonio Fraulo ‡; Agatha All Along – Russell Bobbitt and Jim Stubblefield; American Primeval – Tyler Patton; Manhunt – Cameron Lowande; Masters of the Air – Chris Cull	Variety, Reality, Game Show, or Event Special: The Rehearsal – Treven Bedwell ‡; Adam Sandler: Love You – Mark Kelly; House of Villains – Randy Taylor; The Masked Singer – Damien Hattori
Short Form: Commercials, Web Series, and Music Videos: "Fortnight" music video (Taylor Swift feat. Post Malone) – Brad Elliott ‡; Dina & Mita (Doritos) – Mellanie Urquiza; SaboresTV (Topo Chico) – Lauren Melody Shell; Saturday Ritual (short film) – Allison Koss; "Spider Web" music video (Melanie Martinez) – Hannah Olsen

=== 3rd (2026) ===
The 3rd MacGuffin Awards were held at the Paramount Theater on September 12, 2026. Submissions opened on April 29, and the nominees were announced on July 30. Barry Wilkinson won the Lifetime Achievement Award, while food stylist Luis Castro received the Humanitarian Award, and Trish Reilly won the President's Award for her property craft and food styling work.

Contemporary Feature Film: One Battle After Another – Matthew Cavaliero and Robbie Duncan ‡; The Accountant 2 – JP Jones; Happy Gilmore 2 – Tim Wiles; Now You See Me: Now You Don't – Federico Ciommo; Weapons – Mike Scherschel	Period Feature Film: Frankenstein – Christopher Geggie ‡; Springsteen: Deliver Me from Nowhere – David Gulick; Marty Supreme – Michael Jortner; The Phoenician Scheme – Mike Drury and Sandy Hamilton; Sinners – Douglas L. Ware
Fantasy / Science Fiction Feature Film: Avatar: Fire and Ash – Brad Elliott and Melissa Spicer ‡; Bugonia – Ben Hopwood; How to Train Your Dragon – David Cheesman; Tron: Ares – Dean Eilertson; Wicked: For Good – Jamie Wilkinson	One-Hour Contemporary Television Series: The 'Burbs – Sarah Snyder ‡; Daredevil: Born Again – Katie Clinebelle; The Morning Show – Jane Gulick; Pluribus – Mark C. Hansen; Your Friends & Neighbors – Jackie Wertz and Ryan Garguilo
One-Hour Period Television Series: Spider-Noir – Nicole Ruby ‡; The Gilded Age – Peter Gelfman; It: Welcome to Derry – Jim Murray; Monster: The Ed Gein Story – Cameron Lowande; Palm Royale – Parker Swanson	One-Hour Fantasy / Science Fiction Television Series: Fallout – Brad Einhorn and Andy Siegel ‡; Foundation – Radim Cvancara and Jiří Macke; Percy Jackson and the Olympians – Michelle Hendriksen; Star Trek: Strange New Worlds – Emily Hyde; Twisted Metal – Emily Hyde
Half-Hour Multi-Camera Television Series: Vampirina: Teenage Vampire – Addison Esson ‡; Happy's Place – Julie Heuer Jones; Shifting Gears – Jeremy Armstrong; The Upshaws – Charles Faithorn; Wizards Beyond Waverly Place – Lindsay Tomlinson Forrest	Half-Hour Single Camera Television Series: Widow's Bay – Morgan Kling ‡; Abbott Elementary – Brad Elliott; Hacks – Jane Gulick; Murderbot – Nick Whelan; Ted – John Harrington
Television Mini-Series: Chief of War – Jane Gulick, Matthew Cornelius, Nick Komornicki, and Alvin Cabrinha ‡; Black Rabbit – Max Sherwood; Devil in Disguise: John Wayne Gacy – Jim Murray; DTF St. Louis – Katrina Rice; Task – Susannah McCarthy	Variety, Reality, Game Show, or Event Special: The Muppet Show – Theresa Corvino ‡; Bad Thoughts – Mikey Trudel; Jury Duty Presents: Company Retreat – Rebecca Tendick; The First Snow of Fraggle Rock – Kesar Lacroix; The Melon Patch – Lauren Melody Shell
Short Form: Commercials, Web Series, and Music Videos: Brighter Days Ahead – Robbie Duncan ‡; Disneyland 70 – Mellanie Urquiza; Something Beautiful – Todd Daniels; "Manchild" music video (Sabrina Carpenter) – Ryan Payne; Step Into the Holidays (Target) – Jane Gulick

=== Multiple nominations ===
Individuals with multiple awards and nominations
Nominee	Nominations	Awards
Brad Elliott	6	3
Julie Heuer Jones	6	1
Robbie Duncan	4	2
Jane Gulick	4	1
Michael Jortner	3	2
Russell Bobbitt	3	1
Cameron Lowande	3	0
Jim Murray	3	0
Lauren Melody Shell	3	0
Parker Swanson	3	0
Mellanie Urquiza	3	0
Brad Einhorn	2	2
Andrew M. Siegel	2	2
David Cheesman	2	1
Todd Daniels	2	1
Dean Eilertson	2	1
Lindsay Tomlinson Forrest	2	1
Peter Gelfman	2	1
Dean Goodine	2	1
David Gulick	2	1
Catherine Miller	2	1
Justin Onofriechuk	2	1
Nicole Ruby	2	1
Jamie Wilkinson	2	1
Jeremy Armstrong	2	0
Mike Drury	2	0
James Lyman Eddy	2	0
Charles Faithorn	2	0
Mick Flowers	2	0
Sandy Hamilton	2	0
John Harrington	2	0
Michelle Hendriksen	2	0
Emily Hyde	2	0
Mark Kelly	2	0
Hannah Olsen	2	0
Laura Roeper	2	0
Ian Roylance	2	0
Randy Taylor	2	0

Television series with multiple awards and nominations
Television series	Nominations	Awards
Fallout	2	2
The Bear	2	1
The Last of Us	2	1
That '90s Show	2	1
Wizards Beyond Waverly Place	2	1
1923	2	0
Abbott Elementary	2	0
Frasier	2	0
Happy's Place	2	0
Palm Royale	2	0
Percy Jackson and the Olympians	2	0
The Righteous Gemstones	2	0
Star Trek: Strange New Worlds	2	0
Ted	2	0
