= James Pearse Connelly =

American production designer and art director

- Born: James Pearse Connelly; Leonardo, New Jersey, U.S.
- Occupations: Production designer, Art director, Set Decorator

James Pearse Connelly is a Primetime Emmy Award-winner, production designer, art director, and set decorator. Notable projects include NBC’s The Voice and Bravo’s Top Chef, as well as critically acclaimed feature film The Kids Are All Right. In addition to his television accomplishments, Connelly may also be known for his participation in the 2025 Orange County Fair table setting competition or designing celebrity homes.

== Personal life ==
The son of Irish parents, an art teacher and an architect, Connelly participated in theatre in high school which made him decide to pursue set design in college. After completing a Bachelor of Fine Arts degree in theater arts and set design at Rutgers University, he moved to New York and then Los Angeles where he worked for different studios. After spending more than 10 years working for others, at age 30 he started his own business - jpconnelly.com inc.

A member of the Academy since 2007, Connelly has been in the art directors/set decorators peer group since 2008 and has previously served on the Television Academy's Board of Governors. As of January 1, 2025, Connelly is not on the Board of Governors.
