= Kristen Merlino =

American art director

- Education: Carnegie Mellon College of Fine Arts
- Occupation: Art director

Kristen Merlino is an American art director. She was nominated for twelve Primetime Emmy Awards in the category Outstanding Production Design.
