= Eugene Lee (designer) =

American set designer (1939–2023)

- Born: March 9, 1939; Beloit, Wisconsin, U.S.
- Died: February 6, 2023 (aged 83); Providence, Rhode Island, U.S.
- Education: Art Institute of Chicago (BFA); Carnegie Mellon University (BFA); Yale University (MFA)
- Occupation: Set designer
- Notable work: Saturday Night Live
- Spouse: Brooke Lutz (m. 1981)
- Partner: Franne Lee (1970s)
- Children: 2

Eugene Edward Lee (March 9, 1939 – February 6, 2023) was an American set designer who worked in film, theater, and television. He was the production designer for Saturday Night Live from the show's premiere in 1975 until his death, with the exception of seasons 6-10 (1980-1985). Lee became resident designer at Trinity Repertory Company in Providence, Rhode Island, in 1967.

== Life and work ==
Eugene Edward Lee was born in Beloit, Wisconsin. He attended Beloit Memorial High School, had a BFA each from the Goodman School of Drama at the Art Institute of Chicago (now at DePaul University) and Carnegie Mellon University, an MFA from the Yale School of Drama and three honorary PhDs. He won Tony Awards for Candide, Sweeney Todd, and Wicked, as well as the Drama Desk Award for Outstanding Set Design. Lee's other New York theatre work included on Amazing Grace, Alice in Wonderland, The Normal Heart, Agnes of God, Ragtime, Uncle Vanya, Ruby Sunrise, Bounce, and A Number. His film credits include Coppola's Hammett, Huston's Mr. North and Malle's Vanya on 42nd Street.

His work on the musical Candide at the Chelsea Theater Center of Brooklyn and on Broadway are chronicled in great detail in Davi Napoleon's book, Chelsea on the Edge: The Adventures of an American Theater. The book also describes his work on Slave Ship and other productions at the Chelsea.

Lee's designs for both Candde and Slave Ship were immersive. These were early experiments in blocking the audience into the action.

== Personal life and death ==
During the 1970s, Lee was in a relationship with fellow designer Franne Lee. In 1981, he married Brooke Lutz. Lee had one son from each relationship. He was a decades-long resident of Providence, and while working on Saturday Night Live, he commuted to New York City from Rhode Island during the week and stayed at The Yale Club.

Lee died in Providence on February 6, 2023, at the age of 83.

== Honors ==
Lee was inducted into the American Theater Hall of Fame in 2006.

Received the Distinguished Achievement Award in Scenic Design in 2014 from USITT (United States Institute for Theatre Technology)
