= Saturn Award for Best Make-up =

Award for make-up in film

- Awarded for: Best make-up of the year for a genre film
- Country: United States
- Presented by: Academy of Science Fiction, Fantasy and Horror Films
- First award: 1975
- Currently held by: Mike Hill and Megan Many for Frankenstein (2024/2025)
- Website: www.saturnawards.org

The Saturn Award for Best Make-up is one of the annual awards given by the Academy of Science Fiction, Fantasy and Horror Films. The Saturn Awards, which are the oldest film-specialized awards to reward science fiction, fantasy, and horror achievements (the Hugo Award for Best Dramatic Presentation is the oldest award for science fiction and fantasy films), included the category for the first time at the 2nd Saturn Awards for the 1973 film year, eight years before the introduction of the Academy Award for Best Makeup; the winner was An American Werewolf in London (1981).

Rick Baker currently holds the record for most wins with seven and for the most nominations with seventeen.

== Winners and nominees ==
=== 1970s ===
Year	Make-up artist(s)	Film
1973 (2nd)	Dick Smith	The Exorcist
1974/1975 (3rd)	William J. Tuttle	Young Frankenstein
1976 (4th)	William J. Tuttle	Logan's Run
1977 (5th)	Rick Baker and Stuart Freeborn	Star Wars
1977 (5th)	Thomas R. Burman	Demon Seed
1977 (5th)	John Chambers	The Island of Dr. Moreau
1977 (5th)	Dick Smith	The Sentinel
1977 (5th)	Bob Westmoreland, Thomas R. Burman, and Carlo Rambaldi	Close Encounters of the Third Kind
1978 (6th)	Rick Baker and William J. Tuttle	The Fury
1978 (6th)	Thomas R. Burman and Edouard F. Henriques	Invasion of the Body Snatchers
1978 (6th)	Lee Harman, Vincent Callaghan, and Lynn Donahue	Eyes of Laura Mars
1978 (6th)	Joe McKinney and Thomas R. Burman	The Manitou
1978 (6th)	Stan Winston	The Wiz
1979 (7th)	William J. Tuttle	Love at First Bite
1979 (7th)	Pat Hay	Alien
1979 (7th)	Fred B. Phillips, Janna Phillips, and Ve Neill	Star Trek: The Motion Picture
1979 (7th)	Peter Robb-King	Dracula
1979 (7th)	Tom Savini	Dawn of the Dead

=== 1980s ===
Year	Make-up artist(s)	Film
1980 (8th)	Dick Smith	Altered States
1980 (8th)	Dick Smith	Scanners
1980 (8th)	Colin Booker	Fade to Black
1980 (8th)	Rob Bottin and Rick Baker	The Howling
1980 (8th)	Giannetto De Rossi	Zombi 2
1980 (8th)	Sue Dolph, Steve Neill, and Rick Stratton	Battle Beyond the Stars
1981 (9th)	Rick Baker	An American Werewolf in London
1981 (9th)	Ken Chase	Escape from New York
1981 (9th)	Basil Newall and Anna Dryhurst	Excalibur
1981 (9th)	Stan Winston	Dead & Buried
1981 (9th)	Stan Winston	Heartbeeps
1982 (10th)	Dorothy J. Pearl	Poltergeist
1982 (10th)	Sue Dolph	Forbidden World
1982 (10th)	Werner Keppler and James Lee McCoy	Star Trek II: The Wrath of Khan
1982 (10th)	Hatsuo Nagatomo	The House Where Evil Dwells
1982 (10th)	José Antonio Sánchez	Conan the Barbarian
1983 (11th)	Phil Tippett and Stuart Freeborn	Return of the Jedi
1983 (11th)	Ken Brooke	Strange Invaders
1983 (11th)	Gary Liddiard and James R. Scribner	Something Wicked This Way Comes
1983 (11th)	James R. Scribner	Nightmares
1983 (11th)	Dick Smith and Carl Fullerton	The Hunger
1984 (12th)	Stan Winston	The Terminator
1984 (12th)	Giannetto De Rossi	Dune
1984 (12th)	Greg LaCava	Gremlins
1984 (12th)	Robert J. Schiffer	Splash
1984 (12th)	Tom Smith	Indiana Jones and the Temple of Doom
1985 (13th)	Tom Savini	Day of the Dead
1985 (13th)	Rob Bottin	Explorers
1985 (13th)	Anthony Doublin, John Naulin, and John Carl Buechler	Re-Animator
1985 (13th)	William Munns	The Return of the Living Dead
1985 (13th)	Chris Walas	Enemy Mine
1986 (14th)	Chris Walas	The Fly
1986 (14th)	Rob Bottin	Legend
1986 (14th)	John Carl Buechler, John Naulin, Anthony Doublin, and Mark Shostrom	From Beyond
1986 (14th)	Wes Dawn, Jeff Dawn, and James Lee McCoy	Star Trek IV: The Voyage Home
1986 (14th)	Peter Robb-King	Aliens
1987 (15th)	Rob Bottin and Stephan Dupuis	RoboCop
1987 (15th)	Rick Baker	Harry and the Hendersons
1987 (15th)	Greg Cannom, Ve Neill, and Steve La Porte	The Lost Boys
1987 (15th)	Bob Keen	Hellraiser
1987 (15th)	Mark Shostrom	Evil Dead II
1987 (15th)	Kevin Yagher, Mark Shostrom, and R. Christopher Biggs	A Nightmare on Elm Street 3: Dream Warriors
1988 (16th)	Ve Neill, Steve La Porte, and Robert Short	Beetlejuice
1988 (16th)	David LeRoy Anderson and Lance Anderson	The Serpent and the Rainbow
1988 (16th)	R. Christopher Biggs and Sheri Short	Critters 2: The Main Course
1988 (16th)	John M. Elliott Jr. and Stan Winston	Alien Nation
1988 (16th)	Bob Keen	Waxwork
1988 (16th)	Mark Shostrom	Phantasm II
1989/1990 (17th)	John Caglione Jr., Doug Drexler, and Cheri Minns	Dick Tracy
1989/1990 (17th)	Rob Bottin, Jeff Dawn, Craig Berkeley, and Robin Weiss	Total Recall
1989/1990 (17th)	Ken Chase, Michael Mills, and Kenny Myers	Back to the Future Part II
1989/1990 (17th)	Stephan Dupuis, Dennis Pawlik, Jo-Anne Smith-Ojeil, and Jayne Dancose	The Fly II
1989/1990 (17th)	Paul Engelen, Lynda Armstrong, and Nick Dudman	Batman
1989/1990 (17th)	Tony Gardner and Larry Hamlin	Darkman
1989/1990 (17th)	Bob Keen and Geoffrey Portass	Nightbreed
1989/1990 (17th)	John Stephenson	The Witches
1989/1990 (17th)	Maggie Weston and Fabrizio Sforza	The Adventures of Baron Munchausen

=== 1990s ===
Year	Make-up artist(s)	Film
1991 (18th)	Carl Fullerton and Neal Martz	The Silence of the Lambs
1991 (18th)	David B. Miller	Nothing but Trouble
1991 (18th)	Gordon J. Smith	Body Parts
1991 (18th)	John Vulich and Everett Burrell	Night of the Living Dead
1991 (18th)	Stan Winston and Scott H. Eddo	Predator 2
1991 (18th)	Stan Winston and Jeff Dawn	Terminator 2: Judgment Day
1992 (19th)	Stan Winston and Ve Neill	Batman Returns
1992 (19th)	Greg Cannom, Matthew W. Mungle, and Michèle Burke	Bram Stoker's Dracula
1992 (19th)	Steve Johnson	Highway to Hell
1992 (19th)	Bob Keen (Image Animation)	Candyman
1992 (19th)	Bob Keen	Hellraiser III: Hell on Earth
1992 (19th)	Michael Mills and Edward French	Star Trek VI: The Undiscovered Country
1992 (19th)	Dick Smith and Kevin Haney	Death Becomes Her
1993 (20th)	Kevin Haney	Addams Family Values
1993 (20th)	Screaming Mad George and Steve Johnson (Alterian Inc.)	Freaked
1993 (20th)	Jeff Goodwin, Vincent J. Guastini, and Rob Burman	Super Mario Bros.
1993 (20th)	Bob Keen	Warlock: The Armageddon
1993 (20th)	(K.N.B. EFX Group Inc., Alterian Inc.)	Army of Darkness
1993 (20th)	John Vulich and Everett Burrell	The Dark Half
1993 (20th)	Kevin Yagher and Mitchell J. Coughlin	Man's Best Friend
1994 (21st)	Rick Baker and Ve Neill	Ed Wood
1994 (21st)	Rick Baker	Wolf
1994 (21st)	Greg Cannom	The Mask
1994 (21st)	Alec Gillis and Tom Woodruff Jr.	The Santa Clause
1994 (21st)	Daniel Parker and Paul Engelen	Mary Shelley's Frankenstein
1994 (21st)	Stan Winston and Michèle Burke	Interview with the Vampire
1995 (22nd)	Jean Ann Black and Rob Bottin	Se7en
1995 (22nd)	Rick Baker, Ve Neill, and Yolanda Toussieng	Batman Forever
1995 (22nd)	Nick Dudman and Chris Cunningham	Judge Dredd
1995 (22nd)	Steve Johnson, Bill Corso, and Kenny Myers	Species
1995 (22nd)	(K.N.B. EFX Group Inc.)	From Dusk till Dawn
1995 (22nd)	(K.N.B. EFX Group Inc.)	In the Mouth of Madness
1996 (23rd)	Rick Baker and David LeRoy Anderson	The Nutty Professor
1996 (23rd)	Rick Baker and Richard Taylor	The Frighteners
1996 (23rd)	Greg Cannom	Thinner
1996 (23rd)	Jenny Shircore and Peter Owen	Mary Reilly
1996 (23rd)	Michael Westmore, Scott Wheeler, and Jake Garber	Star Trek: First Contact
1996 (23rd)	Stan Winston and Shane Mahan	The Island of Dr. Moreau
1997 (24th)	Rick Lazzarini and Gordon J. Smith	Mimic
1997 (24th)	David Atherton and Kevin Yagher	Face/Off
1997 (24th)	Rick Baker, David LeRoy Anderson, and Katherine James	Men in Black
1997 (24th)	Ve Neill and Jeff Dawn	Batman & Robin
1997 (24th)	Luigi Rocchetti and Neal Martz	The Devil's Advocate
1997 (24th)	Cindy J. Williams (K.N.B. EFX Group Inc.)	Spawn
1998 (25th)	Robert Kurtzman, Greg Nicotero, and Howard Berger	Vampires
1998 (25th)	Greg Cannom and Michael Germain	Blade
1998 (25th)	Alec Gillis, Tom Woodruff Jr., Michael Mills, and Greg Nelson	The X-Files: Fight the Future
1998 (25th)	Bob McCarron, Lesley Vanderwalt, and Lynn Wheeler	Dark City
1998 (25th)	Peter Robb-King	Lost in Space
1998 (25th)	Michael Westmore	Star Trek: Insurrection
1999 (26th)	Nick Dudman and Aileen Seaton	The Mummy
1999 (26th)	Paul Engelen, Sue Love, and Nick Dudman	Star Wars: Episode I – The Phantom Menace
1999 (26th)	Nikki Gooley, Bob McCarron, and Wendy Sainsbury	The Matrix
1999 (26th)	Fae Hammond	Ravenous
1999 (26th)	Stan Winston, Hallie D'Amore, and Ve Neill	Galaxy Quest
1999 (26th)	Kevin Yagher and Peter Owen	Sleepy Hollow

=== 2000s ===
Year	Make-up artist(s)	Film
2000 (27th)	Rick Baker and Gail Rowell-Ryan	How the Grinch Stole Christmas
2000 (27th)	Rick Baker, Nena Smarz, and Edie Giles	Nutty Professor II: The Klumps
2000 (27th)	Ann Buchanan and Amber Sibley	Shadow of the Vampire
2000 (27th)	Michèle Burke and Edouard F. Henriques (KNB, EFX Inc.)	The Cell
2000 (27th)	Alec Gillis, Tom Woodruff Jr., Jeff Dawn, and Charles Porlier	The 6th Day
2000 (27th)	Gordon J. Smith and Ann Brodie (FX Smith Inc.)	X-Men
2001 (28th)	Greg Cannom and Wesley Wofford	Hannibal
2001 (28th)	Rick Baker and John Blake	Planet of the Apes
2001 (28th)	Michèle Burke and Camille Calvet	Vanilla Sky
2001 (28th)	Nick Dudman, Mark Coulier, and John Lambert	Harry Potter and the Sorcerer's Stone
2001 (28th)	Peter Owen and Richard Taylor	The Lord of the Rings: The Fellowship of the Ring
2001 (28th)	Aileen Seaton, Nick Dudman, and Jane Walker	The Mummy Returns
2002 (29th)	Peter Owen and Peter King	The Lord of the Rings: The Two Towers
2002 (29th)	Rick Baker, Jean Ann Black, and Bill Sturgeon	The Ring
2002 (29th)	Michèle Burke and Camille Calvet (KNB Effects Group Inc.)	Minority Report
2002 (29th)	Nick Dudman and Amanda Knight	Harry Potter and the Chamber of Secrets
2002 (29th)	Michelle Taylor, Gary Matanky, Bob Newton, and Mark Boley	Blade II
2002 (29th)	Michael Westmore	Star Trek: Nemesis
2003 (30th)	Richard Taylor and Peter King	The Lord of the Rings: The Return of the King
2003 (30th)	Rick Baker, Bill Corso, and Robin L. Neal	The Haunted Mansion
2003 (30th)	Jeff Dawn and John Rosengrant	Terminator 3: Rise of the Machines
2003 (30th)	Ve Neill and Martin Samuel	Pirates of the Caribbean: The Curse of the Black Pearl
2003 (30th)	Trefor Proud and Balázs Novák	Underworld
2003 (30th)	Gordon J. Smith	X-Men 2
2004 (31st)	Jake Garber, Matt Rose, and Mike Elizalde	Hellboy
2004 (31st)	David LeRoy Anderson and Mario Cacioppo	Dawn of the Dead
2004 (31st)	Greg Cannom and Steve La Porte	Van Helsing
2004 (31st)	Nick Dudman and Amanda Knight	Harry Potter and the Prisoner of Azkaban
2004 (31st)	Paul Jones	Resident Evil: Apocalypse
2004 (31st)	Valli O'Reilly and Bill Corso	Lemony Snicket's A Series of Unfortunate Events
2005 (32nd)	Howard Berger, Nikki Gooley, and Greg Nicotero	The Chronicles of Narnia: The Lion, the Witch and the Wardrobe
2005 (32nd)	Howard Berger and Greg Nicotero	Land of the Dead
2005 (32nd)	Howard Berger and Greg Nicotero	Sin City
2005 (32nd)	Nick Dudman and Amanda Knight	Harry Potter and the Goblet of Fire
2005 (32nd)	Dave Elsey, Lou Elsey, and Nikki Gooley	Star Wars: Episode III – Revenge of the Sith
2005 (32nd)	Richard Taylor, Gino Acevedo, Dominie Till, and Peter King	King Kong
2006 (33rd)	Todd Masters and Dan Rebert	Slither
2006 (33rd)	Howard Berger, Greg Nicotero, and Mario Michisanti	The Hills Have Eyes
2006 (33rd)	Paul Hyett and Vickie Lang	The Descent
2006 (33rd)	David Martí and Montse Ribé	Pan's Labyrinth
2006 (33rd)	Ve Neill and Joel Harlow	Pirates of the Caribbean: Dead Man's Chest
2006 (33rd)	Greg Nicotero and Scott Patton	The Texas Chainsaw Massacre: The Beginning
2007 (34th)	Ve Neill and Martin Samuel	Pirates of the Caribbean: At World's End
2007 (34th)	Howard Berger, Greg Nicotero, and Jake Garber	Grindhouse (for the segment Planet Terror)
2007 (34th)	Nick Dudman and Amanda Knight	Harry Potter and the Order of the Phoenix
2007 (34th)	Davina Lamont and Gino Acevedo	30 Days of Night
2007 (34th)	Peter Owen and Ivana Primorac	Sweeney Todd: The Demon Barber of Fleet Street
2007 (34th)	Shaun Smith, Mark Rappaport, and Scott Wheeler	300
2008 (35th)	Greg Cannom	The Curious Case of Benjamin Button
2008 (35th)	John Caglione Jr. and Conor O'Sullivan	The Dark Knight
2008 (35th)	Mike Elizalde	Hellboy II: The Golden Army
2008 (35th)	Paul Hyett	Doomsday
2008 (35th)	Greg Nicotero and Paul Engelen	The Chronicles of Narnia: Prince Caspian
2008 (35th)	Gerald Quist	Tropic Thunder
2009 (36th)	Barney Burman, Mindy Hall, and Joel Harlow	Star Trek
2009 (36th)	Howard Berger and Greg Nicotero	The Book of Eli
2009 (36th)	Howard Berger and Greg Nicotero	Drag Me to Hell
2009 (36th)	Joe Dunckley, Sarah Rubano, and Frances Richardson	District 9
2009 (36th)	Sarah Monzani	The Imaginarium of Doctor Parnassus
2009 (36th)	Mike Smithson and John Rosengrant	Terminator Salvation

=== 2010s ===
Year	Make-up artist(s)	Film
2010 (37th)	Rick Baker and Dave Elsey	The Wolfman
2010 (37th)	Howard Berger and Greg Nicotero	Splice
2010 (37th)	Andy Clement, Jennifer McDaniel, and Tarra D. Day	Let Me In
2010 (37th)	Andy Clement and Donald Mowat	Repo Men
2010 (37th)	Mark Coulier, Nick Dudman, and Amanda Knight	Harry Potter and the Deathly Hallows – Part 1
2010 (37th)	Lindsay MacGowan and Shane Mahan	Alice in Wonderland
2011 (38th)	Dave Elsey, Fran Needham, and Conor O'Sullivan	X-Men: First Class
2011 (38th)	Tamar Aviv	The Skin I Live In
2011 (38th)	Annick Chartier, Adrien Morot, and Nikoletta Skarlatos	Immortals
2011 (38th)	Nick Dudman and Amanda Knight	Harry Potter and the Deathly Hallows – Part 2
2011 (38th)	Shaun Smith and Scott Wheeler	Conan the Barbarian
2011 (38th)	Tom Woodruff Jr. and Alec Gillis	The Thing
2012 (39th)	Heike Merker, Daniel Parker, and Jeremy Woodhead	Cloud Atlas
2012 (39th)	Jean Ann Black and Fay von Schroeder	The Twilight Saga: Breaking Dawn – Part 2
2012 (39th)	Naomi Donne, Donald Mowat, and Love Larson	Skyfall
2012 (39th)	Peter King, Rick Findlater, and Tami Lane	The Hobbit: An Unexpected Journey
2012 (39th)	David Martí, Montse Ribé, and Vasit Suchitta	The Impossible
2012 (39th)	Greg Nicotero, Howard Berger, Peter Montagna, and Julie Hewett	Hitchcock
2013 (40th)	Donald Mowat	Prisoners
2013 (40th)	Patrick Baxter, Jane O'Kane, and Roger Murray	Evil Dead
2013 (40th)	Howard Berger, Jamie Kelman, and Peter Montagna	Lone Survivor
2013 (40th)	Karen Cohen, David White, and Elizabeth Yianni-Georgiou	Thor: The Dark World
2013 (40th)	Fae Hammond, Mark Coulier, and Kirstin Chalmers	Rush
2013 (40th)	Peter King, Rick Findlater, and Richard Taylor	The Hobbit: The Desolation of Smaug
2014 (41st)	David White and Elizabeth Yianni-Georgiou	Guardians of the Galaxy
2014 (41st)	Mark Coulier and Daniel Phillips	Dracula Untold
2014 (41st)	Peter King, Rick Findlater, and Gino Acevedo	The Hobbit: The Battle of the Five Armies
2014 (41st)	Peter King and Matthew Smith	Into the Woods
2014 (41st)	Adrien Morot and Norma Hill-Patton	X-Men: Days of Future Past
2014 (41st)	Bill Terezakis and Lisa Love	Dawn of the Planet of the Apes
2015 (42nd)	Neal Scanlan	Star Wars: The Force Awakens
2015 (42nd)	Joel Harlow and Kenny Niederbaumer	Black Mass
2015 (42nd)	David Martí, Montse Ribé, and Xavi Bastida	Crimson Peak
2015 (42nd)	Damian Martin and Nadine Prigge	Mad Max: Fury Road
2015 (42nd)	Donald Mowat	Sicario
2015 (42nd)	Greg Nicotero, Howard Berger, and Heba Thorisdottir	The Hateful Eight
2016 (43rd)	Joel Harlow and Monica Huppert	Star Trek Beyond
2016 (43rd)	Allan A. Apone, Jo-Ann MacNeil, and Marta Roggero	Suicide Squad
2016 (43rd)	Amy Byrne	Rogue One: A Star Wars Story
2016 (43rd)	Charles Carter, Rita Ciccozzi, and Rosalina Da Silva	X-Men: Apocalypse
2016 (43rd)	Nick Knowles	Fantastic Beasts and Where to Find Them
2016 (43rd)	Jeremy Woodhead	Doctor Strange
2017 (44th)	Joel Harlow and Ken Diaz	Black Panther
2017 (44th)	John Blake and Brian Sipe	Guardians of the Galaxy Vol. 2
2017 (44th)	Alec Gillis, Sean Sansom, Tom Woodruff Jr., and Shane Zander	It
2017 (44th)	Mike Hill and Shane Mahan	The Shape of Water
2017 (44th)	Peter King and Neal Scanlan	Star Wars: The Last Jedi
2017 (44th)	Donald Mowat	Blade Runner 2049
2017 (44th)	Arjen Tuiten	Wonder
2018/2019 (45th)	John Blake and Brian Sipe	Avengers: Endgame
2018/2019 (45th)	Annick Chartier and Adrien Morot	Pet Sematary
2018/2019 (45th)	Judy Chin and Mike Marino	The Dead Don't Die
2018/2019 (45th)	Bill Corso	Destroyer
2018/2019 (45th)	Mark Coulier and Fernanda Perez	Suspiria
2018/2019 (45th)	Lisa Love and Tate Steinsiek	Dragged Across Concrete
2018/2019 (45th)	Tristan Versluis, Naomi Donne, and Duncan Jarman	Overlord
2019/2020 (46th)	Amanda Knight and Neal Scanlan	Star Wars: The Rise of Skywalker
2019/2020 (46th)	Bianca Appice, Bill Corso, Stephen Kelley, Dennis Liddiard, and Kevin Yagher	Bill & Ted Face the Music
2019/2020 (46th)	Norman Cabrera, Mike Elizalde, and Mike Hill	Scary Stories to Tell in the Dark
2019/2020 (46th)	Iantha Goldberg, Sean Sansom, and Shane Zander	It Chapter Two
2019/2020 (46th)	Robert Kurtzman and Bernadette Mazur	Doctor Sleep
2019/2020 (46th)	Arjen Tuiten and David White	Maleficent: Mistress of Evil

=== 2020s ===
Year	Make-up artist(s)	Film
2021/2022 (50th)	Love Larson, Donald Mowat, and Eva von Bahr	Dune
2021/2022 (50th)	Ozzy Alvarez, Victoria Down, Kevin Kirkpatrick, and Justin Raleigh	Army of the Dead
2021/2022 (50th)	Alexandra Anger, Monica Pavez, and Evi Zafiropoulou	Crimes of the Future
2021/2022 (50th)	Naomi Donne and Mike Marino	The Batman
2021/2022 (50th)	Greg Funk, Brian Sipe, and Heba Thorisdottir	The Suicide Squad
2021/2022 (50th)	Mike Hill, Jo-Ann MacNeil, and Megan Many	Nightmare Alley
2021/2022 (50th)	Adam Johansen and Matteo Silvi	Thor: Love and Thunder
2022/2023 (51st)	Donald Mowat	The Covenant
2022/2023 (51st)	Luke Polti	Evil Dead Rise
2022/2023 (51st)	Alexei Dmitriew, Lindsay MacGowan, and Shane Mahan	Guardians of the Galaxy Vol. 3
2022/2023 (51st)	Luisa Abel and Jason Hamer	Oppenheimer
2022/2023 (51st)	Alec Gillis and Tom Woodruff Jr.	Prey
2022/2023 (51st)	Christien Tinsley	Renfield
2023/2024 (52nd)	Pierre-Olivier Persin	The Substance
2023/2024 (52nd)	Pam Smyth	Alien: Romulus
2023/2024 (52nd)	Neal Scanlan, Christine Blundell, and Lesa Warrener	Beetlejuice Beetlejuice
2023/2024 (52nd)	Donald Mowat, Love Larson, and Eva von Bahr	Dune: Part Two
2023/2024 (52nd)	Werner Pretorius, Felix Fox, and Madelaine Hermans	Longlegs
2023/2024 (52nd)	Jeremy Selenfriend, Sasha Grossman, and Alec Gillis	Smile 2
2024/2025 (53rd)	Mike Hill and Megan Many	Frankenstein
2024/2025 (53rd)	Flora Moody and John Nolan	28 Years Later
2024/2025 (53rd)	Mike Fontaine and Siân Richards	Sinners
2024/2025 (53rd)	Zabrina Matiru and Donald Mowat	Tron: Ares
2024/2025 (53rd)	Jason Collins, Leo Satkovich, and Melizah Wheat	Weapons
2024/2025 (53rd)	Mark Coulier and Frances Hannon	Wicked: For Good
