= Primetime Emmy Award for Outstanding Makeup (Non-Prosthetic) =

Television award category

Primetime Emmy Award for Outstanding Contemporary Makeup (Non-Prosthetic)
- Awarded for: Outstanding Contemporary Makeup (Non-Prosthetic)
- Country: United States
- Presented by: Academy of Television Arts & Sciences
- First award: 2020
- Currently held by: Margo's Got Money Troubles (2026)
- Website: http://www.emmys.com/

Primetime Emmy Award for Outstanding Period or Fantasy/Sci-Fi Makeup (Non-Prosthetic)
- Awarded for: Outstanding Period or Fantasy/Sci-Fi Makeup (Non-Prosthetic)
- Country: United States
- Presented by: Academy of Television Arts & Sciences
- First award: 2020
- Currently held by: Palm Royale (2026)
- Website: http://www.emmys.com/

This is a list of winners and nominees of the Primetime Emmy Award for Outstanding Contemporary Makeup (Non-Prosthetic) and Outstanding Period or Fantasy/Sci-Fi Makeup (Non-Prosthetic). Before 2002, the category was called Outstanding Makeup for a Miniseries, Movie, or Special and included prosthetic and special effects makeup. Prior to 2020, awards were split between miniseries or movies and ongoing series.

Beginning in 2024, the Outstanding Period and/or Character Makeup (Non-Prosthetic) category will be renamed Outstanding Period or Fantasy/Sci-Fi Makeup (Non-Prosthetic).

In the following list, the first titles listed in gold are the winners; those not in gold are nominees, which are listed in alphabetical order. The years given are those in which the ceremonies took place:

== Winners and nominations ==
=== 1960s ===
Outstanding Individual Achievement in the Visual Arts (Makeup)

Year	Program	Episode	Nominees	Network
1965
1965	The Magnificent Yankee (Hallmark Hall of Fame)		Bob O'Bradovich	NBC
1966
1966	Inherit the Wind (Hallmark Hall of Fame)		Bob O'Bradovich	NBC
1967
1967	Mark Twain Tonight!		Dick Smith	CBS
1967	Alice Through the Looking Glass		Claude Thompson	NBC
1968
1968	Lost in Space	"The Space Destructors"	Daniel C. Striepeke	CBS
1968	The Strange Case of Dr. Jekyll and Mr. Hyde		Dick Smith	ABC
1969
1969	And Debbie Makes Six		Claude Thompson	ABC

=== 1970s ===
Outstanding Achievement in Makeup

Year	Program	Episode	Nominees	Network
1970
1970	The Don Adams Special: Hooray for Hollywood		Louis A. Phillippi, Ray Sebastian	CBS
1970	This Is Tom Jones		Shirley Muslin, Marie Roche	ABC
1971
1971	Mission: Impossible		Robert Dawn	CBS
1971	Bewitched	"Samantha's Old Man"	Rolf Miller	ABC
1971	Hamlet		Marie Roche	NBC
1971	The Third Bill Cosby Special		Harry Blake, Perc Westmore	NBC
1972
1972	Kung Fu	"Pilot"	Frank Westmore	ABC
1972	Gideon		Harry Blake	NBC
1972	Night Gallery	"Pickman's Model"	Nick Marcellino, Leonard Engelman, John Chambers	NBC
1973
1973	Gargoyles		Stan Winston, Ellis Burman Jr., Del Armstrong	CBS
1973	Frankenstein (ABC's Wide World of Entertainment)		Marvin Westmore, Michael Westmore	ABC
1973	Dr. Jekyll and Mr. Hyde		Neville Smallwood	NBC
1973	Kung Fu		Frank Westmore	ABC
1973	The Red Pony		Richard Cobos, Allan Snyder	NBC
1973	The Waltons		Robert Sidell	CBS
1974
1974	The Autobiography of Miss Jane Pittman		Stan Winston, Rick Baker	CBS
1974	Judgment: The Trial of Julius and Ethel Rosenberg		Ben Nye	ABC
1974	The Phantom of Hollywood		William J. Tuttle	CBS
1974	Portrait: A Man Whose Name Was John		Nick Marcellino, James Lee McCoy	ABC
1975 (Note: As a juried award, nominees had to receive 50% approval to win the award. None of the nominees met the benchmark and no award was given.)
1975	Benjamin Franklin	"The Ambassador"	Mark Bussan	CBS
1975	Masquerade Party		Harry Blake, Stan Winston, Jim Kail, Ralph Gulko, Robert Ostermann, Tommy Cole, Larry Abbott	Syndicated
1975	Twigs		John Chambers, Daniel C. Striepeke	CBS
1976
1976	Eleanor and Franklin		Del Armstrong, Michael Westmore	ABC
1976	Babe		William J. Tuttle	CBS
1976	The 1975 Fashion Awards		Allan Snyder	ABC
1977
1977	Eleanor and Franklin: The White House Years		Ken Chase, Joe DiBella	ABC
1977	Beauty and the Beast		Del Acevedo, John Chambers, Daniel C. Striepeke	NBC
1977	An Evening with Diana Ross		Stan Winston	NBC
1977	Harry S. Truman: Plain Speaking		Dick Smith	PBS
1977	The Million Dollar Rip-Off		Michael Westmore, Edwin Butterworth, Charles H. Schram	NBC
1978
1978	How the West Was Won	"Part 2"	Richard Cobos, Walter Schenk	ABC
1978	The Amazing Howard Hughes		Michael Westmore, Hank Edds, Lynn F. Reynolds	CBS
1978	King		Christina Smith	NBC
1978	Little House on the Prairie	"The Fighter"	Hank Edds, Allan Snyder	NBC
1978	A Love Affair: The Eleanor and Lou Gehrig Story		Frank Westmore, Michael Westmore	NBC
1979	Outstanding Achievement in Makeup			
1979	Backstairs at the White House	"Book Four"	Tommy Cole, Mark Bussan, Ron Walters	NBC
1979	Elvis		Marvin Westmore	ABC
1979	Lady of the House		Leo Lotito Jr., Nicholas Pagliaro	NBC
1979	Roots: The Next Generations	"Part 3"	Ken Chase, Joe DiBella, Zoltan Elek, Tom Miller, David Dittmar	ABC
1979	Outstanding Individual Achievement - Special Class (Note: As a juried award, nominees had to garner 50% approval to win the award. The nominees did not meet the benchmark and no award was given.)			
1979	General Electric's All-Star Anniversary		Harry Blake, David A. Dittmar, Bob Ostermann	ABC

=== 1980s ===
Year	Program	Episode	Nominees	Network
1980
1980	The Scarlett O'Hara War		Richard Blair	NBC
1980	Beyond Westworld	"Pilot"	John Chambers, Robert Sidell	CBS
1980	Disraeli: Portrait of a Romantic	"Dizzy"	Lorraine Dawkins, Anita Harris, Sheila Mann, Mary Southgate, Brenda Yewdell	PBS
1980	Haywire		Jack Freeman	CBS
1980	Salem's Lot		Ben Lane, Jack H. Young	CBS
1981
1981	Peter and Paul		Albert Jeyte, Jim Kail	CBS
1981	The Diary of Anne Frank		Scott H. Eddo, Stanley Smith	NBC
1981	Father Damien: The Leper Priest		John Inzerella	NBC
1981	The Jayne Mansfield Story		Alan Friedman, Lona Jeffers	CBS
1981	Marilyn: The Untold Story		Allan Snyder	ABC
1981	Masada	"Part 4"	Del Acevedo, Albert Jeyte	ABC
1982
1982	World War III		Paul Stanhope Jr.	NBC
1982	Fantasy Island	"Case Against Mr. Roarke/Save Sherlock Holmes"	Leo Lotito Jr., Nora de la Torre	ABC
1982	The Letter		Jack Freeman, Jack Barron	ABC
1982	Mae West		Richard Blair	ABC
1982	Oliver Twist		Del Acevedo, Pauline Heys	CBS
1983
1983	The Thorn Birds	"Part 4"	Del Acevedo	ABC
1983	Fame	"Not in Kansas Anymore"	Jack Wilson	NBC
1983	V		Leo Lotito Jr., Werner Keppler	NBC
1983	Who Will Love My Children?		Zoltan Elek, Monty Westmore	ABC
1984
1984	Why Me?		Michael Westmore	ABC
1984	The Day After		Michael Westmore, Zoltan Elek	ABC
1984	George Washington		Alan Fama, Rod Wilson, Jay Cannistraci	CBS
1984	The Mystic Warrior		Alan Fama, Leo Lotito Jr., Werner Keppler	ABC
1984	V: The Final Battle	"Part 2"	Leo Lotito Jr., Werner Keppler, Marvin Westmore, Alan Fama	NBC
1985
1985	The Three Wishes of Billy Grier		Michael Westmore, Robert Norin, Jamie Brown, Sandy Cooper	ABC
1985	The Burning Bed		Michael Hancock, Fred C. Blau Jr.	NBC
1985	Fatal Vision		Stephen Abrums	NBC
1985	V	"The Rescue"	Leo Lotito Jr., Marvin Westmore, Alan Fama	NBC
1985	Victims for Victims: The Theresa Saldana Story		Robert Norin	NBC
1986	Outstanding Makeup for a Miniseries or a Special			
1986	Second Serve		Del Acevedo, Paul Stanhope Jr.	CBS
1986	Alice in Wonderland	"Part 2"	Terry Smith, Werner Keppler, Leo Lotito Jr.	CBS
1986	Annihilator		Michael Westmore, Zoltan Elek	NBC
1986	An Early Frost		Rchard Blair, Stephen Abrums	NBC
1986	North and South	"Part 6"	Alan Fama, Rod Wilson, Dick Smith	ABC
1986	Outstanding Makeup for a Series			
1986	Airwolf	"The Horn of Plenty"	Rod Wilson	CBS
1986	Amazing Stories	"Gather Ye Acorns"	Chuck House, Michael Westmore	NBC
1986	Dynasty	"Masquerade"	Jack Freeman, Robert Sidell, Bruce Hutchinson	ABC
1987	Outstanding Makeup for a Miniseries or a Special			
1987	The Last Days of Patton		Del Acevedo, Eddie Knight, Alan Boyle	CBS
1987	George Washington II: The Forging of a Nation	"Part 2"	Alan Fama, Jay Cannistraci, Dennis Eger	CBS
1987	Nutcracker: Money, Madness & Murder	"Part 1"	Alan Fama, Paul Stanhope Jr., Dennis Eger	NBC
1987	When the Time Comes		Richard Blair	ABC
1987	Outstanding Makeup for a Series			
1987	Amazing Stories	"Without Diana"	Michael Westmore, Mark Bussan, Chuck House, Fred C. Blau Jr.	NBC
1987	MacGyver	"Friends"	Rolf John Keppler, Michael Westmore, Robert Norin	ABC
1987	Max Headroom	"Security Systems"	Katalin Elek, Zoltan Elek	ABC
1987	The Tracey Ullman Show	"The Makeover"	Bari Dreiband-Burman, Thomas R. Burman	Fox
1988	Outstanding Makeup for a Miniseries or a Special			
1988	Poor Little Rich Girl: The Barbara Hutton Story		Ronnie Specter, Linda DeVetta, Pauline Heys	NBC
1988	The King of Love		Moni Mansano	ABC
1988	Right to Die		Tommy Cole, Pat Gerhardt	NBC
1988	Something Is Out There		Rick Baker	NBC
1988	The Taking of Flight 847: The Uli Derickson Story		John M. Elliott Jr.	NBC
1988	Outstanding Makeup for a Series			
1988	Star Trek: The Next Generation	"Conspiracy"	Michael Westmore, Werner Keppler, Gerald Quist	Syndicated
1988	Beauty and the Beast	"Promises of Someday"	Margaret Prentice, Rick Baker, Vincent Prentice, Fred C. Blau Jr.	CBS
1988	Beauty and the Beast	"To Reign in Hell"	Margaret Prentice, Rick Baker	CBS
1988	Highway to Heaven	"I Was a Middle-Aged Werewolf"	Hank Edds, Michael Westmore, Gerald Quist	CBS
1988	Star Trek: The Next Generation	"Coming of Age"	Michael Westmore, Werner Keppler, Gerald Quist, Rolf John Keppler	Syndicated
1989	Outstanding Makeup for a Miniseries or a Special			
1989	Lonesome Dove	"The Return"	Richard Blair	CBS
1989	David		Michael Westmore, Gerald Quist, Phil Richards	ABC
1989	War and Remembrance	"Part 2"	Wes Dawn, Magdalen Gaffney, Jim Kail, Christopher Tucker	ABC
1989	War and Remembrance	"Part 3"	Wes Dawn, Magdalen Gaffney, Jim Kail, Christopher Tucker, Thomas R. Burman, Bari Dreiband-Burman	ABC
1989	Outstanding Makeup for a Series			
1989	The Tracey Ullman Show	"The Subway"	Thomas R. Burman, Carol Schwratz, Bari Dreiband-Burman, Robin LaVigne	Fox
1989	Beauty and the Beast	"Brothers"	Margaret Prentice, Rick Baker, Norman Cabrera, Vincent Prentice, Fred C. Blau Jr.	CBS
1989	Star Trek: The Next Generation	"A Matter of Honor"	Michael Westmore, Gerald Quist, Jana Phillips	Syndicated

=== 1990s ===
Year	Program	Episode	Nominees	Network
1990	Outstanding Makeup for a Miniseries or a Special			
1990	Billy Crystal: Midnight Train to Moscow		Ken Chase	HBO
1990	The Best of the Tracey Ullman Show		Dale Bach-Siss, Dale Condit	Fox
1990	A Cry for Help: The Tracey Thurman Story		Thomas R. Burman, Bari Dreiband-Burman, Angela Levin, Melanie Verkins	NBC
1990	Fall from Grace		Michael Hancock, Fred C. Blau Jr.	NBC
1990	The Phantom of the Opera	"Part 1"	Sophie Landry	NBC
1990	Outstanding Makeup for a Series			
1990	Alien Nation	"Chains of Love"	Michèle Burke, Ken Diaz, Katalin Elek, Richard Snell, Rick Stratton and David Dittmar	Fox
1990	The Tracey Ullman Show	"High School Sweethearts"	Thomas R. Burman, Bari Dreiband-Burman, Dale Condit, Ron Walters, Greg Nelson	Fox
1990	Star Trek: The Next Generation	"Allegiance"	Michael Westmore, Gerald Quist, June Westmore, Hank Edds, Doug Drexler, John Caglione Jr., Ron Walters	Syndicated
1990	The Tracey Ullman Show	"Creative Differences"	Dale Bach-Siss, Bari Dreiband-Burman, Thomas R. Burman, Dale Condit, Ron Walters	Fox
1991	Outstanding Makeup for a Miniseries or a Special			
1991	Son of the Morning Star	"Part 2"	Joe McKinney, Hank Edds, Paul Sanchez, T.C. Williams	ABC
1991	Hiroshima: Out of the Ashes		Todd Masters, Pamela Peitzman	NBC
1991	The Josephine Baker Story		Marie Carter, Julia Fenyvessy	HBO
1991	Outstanding Makeup for a Series			
1991	Quantum Leap	"The Leap Home, Part 1"	Gerald Quist, Michael Mills, Jeremy Swan, Douglas D. Kelly	NBC
1991	Beauty and the Beast	"In the Forests of the Night"	Margaret Prentice, Fred C. Blau Jr.	CBS
1991	L.A. Law	"God Rest Ye Murray Gentleman"	Thomas R. Burman, Bari Dreiband-Burman, Leigh Mitchell, Darrell McIntyre, Ken Diaz	NBC
1991	Star Trek: The Next Generation	"Brothers"	Michael Westmore, Gerald Quist, June Abston Haymore, Michael Mills	Syndicated
1991	Star Trek: The Next Generation	"Identity Crisis"	Michael Westmore, Gerald Quist, June Abston Haymore, Ed French, Jill Rockow, Gilbert A. Mosko	Syndicated
1992	Outstanding Makeup for a Miniseries or a Special			
1992	Mark Twain and Me		Kevin Haney, Donald Mowat	Disney
1992	Young Indiana Jones and the Curse of the Jackal		Pat Hay, Joan Hills, Thomas R. Burman, Bari Dreiband-Burman	ABC
1992	Babe Ruth		Michael Westmore, Michael R. Jones, Richard Schwartz	NBC
1992	Wild Texas Wind		Keith Crary	NBC
1992	Outstanding Individual Achievement in Makeup for a Series			
1992	Star Trek: The Next Generation	"Cost of Living"	Michael Westmore, Gerald Quist, Ron Walters, Jane Haymore, Bob Scribner, Ken Diaz, Karen Westerfield, Richard Snell, Tania McComas	Syndicated
1992	In Living Color	"327"	Stephanie Cozart Burton, Sheryl Ptak	Fox
1992	Northern Exposure	"Cicely"	Joni Powell	CBS
1992	Perfect Strangers	"Citizenship, Part 1"	Matthew W. Mungle, Joe Hailey	ABC
1992	Tales from the Crypt	"Yellow"	Todd Masters, Michael Spatola	HBO
1993	Outstanding Makeup for a Miniseries or a Special			
1993	Citizen Cohn		Lynne K. Eagan, Matthew W. Mungle, John E. Jackson, Deborah La Mia Denaver	HBO
1993	Alex Haley's Queen	"Part 3"	Steve La Porte, Richard Blair, Thomas Floutz, Angela Levin, Rose Librizzi	CBS
1993	Stalin		Stephan Dupuis, Charles Carter, Károly Magyar, Nina Kolodkina, Katalin Elek, Dennis Pawlik	HBO
1993	Tru		Gerald Quist, Elizabeth Spetnagel	PBS
1993	Outstanding Individual Achievement in Makeup for a Series			
1993	Star Trek: Deep Space Nine	"Captive Pursuit"	Michael Westmore, Jill Rockow, Karen Westerfield, Gilbert A. Mosko, Dean Jones, Michael Key, Craig Reardon, Vincent Niebla	Syndicated
1993	Dr. Quinn, Medicine Woman	"Running Ghost"	Michèle Burke, Michael Mills	CBS
1993	Saturday Night Live	"Host: Harvey Keitel"	Jennifer Aspinall	NBC
1993	Space Rangers	"Death Before Dishonor"	Marvin Westmore, Ed French	CBS
1993	Star Trek: The Next Generation	"The Inner Light"	Michael Westmore, Gerald Quist, June Abston Haymore, Karen Westerfield, Jill Rockow, Doug Drexler	Syndicated
1994	Outstanding Makeup for a Miniseries or a Special			
1994	Stephen King's The Stand		Steve Johnson, Bill Corso, David Dupuis, Joel Harlow, Camille Calvet, Ashlee Petersen	ABC
1994	Abraham		Luigi Rocchetti, Federico Laurenti, Renato Francola, Amina Bencherki, Mario Michisanti	TNT
1994	And the Band Played On		Allan A. Apone, Michael Spatola	HBO
1994	Gypsy		Hallie D'Amore, Christy Ann Newquist, Eugenia Weston	CBS
1994	Tracey Takes on New York		Sally Sutton, Bari Dreiband-Burman, Thomas R. Burman	HBO
1994	Outstanding Individual Achievement in Makeup for a Series			
1994	Babylon 5	"The Parliament of Dreams"	Everett Burrell, Ron Pipes, John Vulich, Mary Kay Morse, Greg Funk	Syndicated
1994	Saturday Night Live	"Host: Emilio Estevez"	John Caglione Jr., Margot Boccia, Norman Bryn, Courtney Carell, Linda Castillo, Jack Engel, Linda Grimes, Robin Gurin, Roosevelt Madison Jr., Peter Montagna, Nina Port, Catherine 'Kay' Rowland, Michael R. Thomas	NBC
1994	Star Trek: Deep Space Nine	"Rules of Acquisition"	Camille Calvet, Michael Westmore, Hank Edds, Dean Gates, Dean Jones, Tina Kalliongis, Michael Key, Gil Mosko, Dave Quaschnick, Mike Smithson, Karen Westerfield	Syndicated
1994	Star Trek: The Next Generation	"Genesis"	June Westmore, Michael Westmore, Gilbert A. Mosko, Debbie Zoller, Tina Hoffman, David Quashnick, Mike Smithson, Hank Edds, Kevin Haney, Michael Key	Syndicated
1994	Tales from the Crypt	"Well Cooked Hams"	Todd Masters, Donna-Lou Henderson, Nanette Moore, Scott Wheeler	HBO
1995	Outstanding Makeup for a Miniseries or a Special			
1995	The Show Formerly Known as the Martin Short Show		Kevin Haney, Beverly Schechtman	NBC
1995	Alien Nation: Dark Horizon		Rick Stratton, Richard Snell, Craig Reardon, Janna Phillips, Edouard F. Henriques	Fox
1995	Buffalo Girls		Gerald Quist, Todd McIntosh, Del Acevedo, Hallie D'Amore, Stephen Abrums	CBS
1995	In Search of Dr. Seuss		Tom Brumberger, Darren Perks, Rick Stratton, Marja Webster	TNT
1995	Liz: The Elizabeth Taylor Story		Cheri Minns, Penelope Staley, Matthew W. Mungle, John E. Jackson	NBC
1995	Outstanding Individual Achievement in Makeup for a Series			
1995	Star Trek: Deep Space Nine	"Distant Voices"	Michael Westmore, Camille Calvet, Dean Jones, Dean Gates, Karen Iverson, Scott Wheeler, Michael Key, David Quashnick, Karen Westerfield, Gilbert A. Mosko, Thomas E. Surprenant	Syndicated
1995	Babylon 5	"Acts of Sacrifice"	John Vulich, Everett Burrell, Cinzia Zanetti, Ron Pipes, Greg Funk, Fionagh Cush, John Wheaton, Nik E. Carey, Will Huff, Tania Wanstall, Mike Measimer	Syndicated
1995	Dr. Quinn, Medicine Woman	"Halloween II"	Lesa Nielsen, Vincent Prentice, Margaret Prentice, Jackie Tichenor, Paul Sanchez, Linda Vallejo	CBS
1995	Earth 2	"After the Thaw"	Angela Nogaro, Greg Cannom, Stephen Prouty	NBC
1995	ER	"Pilot"	Susan A. Cabral	NBC
1995	Star Trek: Voyager	"Faces"	Michael Westmore, Greg Nelson, Scott Wheeler, Tina Hoffman, Mark Shostrom, Gilbert A. Mosko, Michael Key, Barry R. Koper, Natalie Wood, Bill Myer	UPN
1996	Outstanding Makeup for a Miniseries or a Special			
1996	Kissinger and Nixon		Patricia Green, Kevin Haney, Charles Porlier	TNT
1996	Alien Nation: Body and Soul		Rick Stratton, Richard Snell, Craig Reardon, Janna Phillips, David Abbott, Kenny Myers, Steve La Porte, Jill Rockow	Fox
1996	The Best of Tracey Takes On...		Ron Berkeley, Kathleen Berkeley, Thomas R. Burman, Bari Dreiband-Burman	HBO
1996	The Late Shift		June Westmore, Monty Westmore, Sharin Helgestad, Del Acevedo, Matthew W. Mungle	HBO
1996	Truman		Ashlee Petersen, Gordon J. Smith, Russell Cate, Evan Penny, Joe Ventura, Raymond Mackintosh, Heidi Seeholzer, Louise Mackintosh, Benjamin Robin	HBO
1996	Outstanding Makeup for a Series			
1996	Star Trek: Voyager	"Threshold"	Michael Westmore, Greg Nelson, Scott Wheeler, Tina Hoffman, Mark Shostrom, Gilbert A. Mosko, Ellis Burman Jr., R. Stephen Weber, Brad Look	UPN
1996	Chicago Hope	"Quiet Riot"	Norman T. Leavitt, Coree Lear, Bari Dreiband-Burman, Thomas R. Burman	CBS
1996	Star Trek: Deep Space Nine	"The Visitor"	Camille Calvet, Michael Westmore, Dean Jones, Karen Iverson, Mark Bussan, Ellis Burman Jr., Scott Wheeler, Gilbert A. Mosko, David Quashnick, Thomas E. Surprenant, R. Stephen Weber, Brad Look, Kevin Haney	Syndicated
1996	Wings	"Death Becomes Him"	Tommy Cole, Ken Wensevic	NBC
1997	Outstanding Makeup for a Miniseries or a Special			
1997	Stephen King's The Shining		Bill Corso, Douglas Noe, Tracey Levy, Ve Neill, Barry R. Koper, Ashlee Petersen, Jill Rockow, Joe Colwell, Steve Johnson, Joel Harlow	ABC
1997	Alien Nation: The Enemy Within		Rick Stratton, Richard Snell, Craig Reardon, Janna Phillips, David Abbott, Edouard F. Henriques, Karen Westerfield, Kenny Myers	Fox
1997	The Hunchback		Julia Vitray, David White, Sacha Carter, Julie Wright, Katalin Jakots, Anna Tesner, Noémi Czakó, Eva Vytlelová	TNT
1997	Miss Evers' Boys		Wynona Price, Matthew W. Mungle	HBO
1997	Trilogy of Terror II		Rick Stratton	USA
1997	Outstanding Makeup for a Series			
1997	Tracey Takes On...	"Vegas"	Ron Berkeley, Kathleen Berkeley, Thomas R. Burman, Bari Dreiband-Burman	HBO
1997	Babylon 5	"The Summoning"	Cinzia Zanetti, Ron Pipes, John Vulich, John Wheaton, Mike Measimer, Gabriel De Cunto, Rob Sherwood, Liz Dean, Fionagh Cush	Syndicated
1997	Buffy the Vampire Slayer	"Welcome to the Hellmouth"	Todd McIntosh, John Vulich, John Maldonado, John Wheaton	The WB
1997	Star Trek: Deep Space Nine	"Apocalypse Rising"	Camille Calvet, Michael Westmore, Karen Iverson, Ellis Burman Jr., R. Stephen Weber, David Quashnick, Dean Jones, Mark Bussan, Brad Look, Belinda Bryant, James MacKinnon, Allan A. Apone, Perri Sorel, Mary Kay Morse, John Maldonado, Lisa Collins, Karen Westerfield	Syndicated
1997	The X-Files	"Leonard Betts"	Laverne Munroe, Toby Lindala	Fox
1998	Outstanding Makeup for a Miniseries, Movie or a Special			
1998	Merlin		Aileen Seaton, Mark Coulier	NBC
1998	From the Earth to the Moon		Gina Lamendola, Greg Cannom, Ve Neill	HBO
1998	George Wallace		Janeen Schreyer, Patricia Androff, Jamie Kelman, Cheryl Ann Nick, Keith Sayer, John E. Jackson, Matthew W. Mungle	TNT
1998	Oliver Twist		Matthew W. Mungle, Ken Jennings	ABC
1998	Snow White: A Tale of Terror		Ann Brodie, Linda DeVetta	Showtime
1998	Outstanding Makeup for a Series			
1998	Buffy the Vampire Slayer	"Surprise/Innocence"	Todd McIntosh, John Vulich, John Maldonado, John Wheaton, Gerald Quist, Margie Kaklamanos, Dayne Johnson, Alan Friedman, Craig Reardon, Michael F. Blake, Robin Beauchesne, Brigette A. Myre, Mark Shostrom	The WB
1998	Babylon 5	"In the Beginning"	John Vulich, John Wheaton, Jeffrey S. Farley, Mark Garbarino, Jerry Gergely, Gabriel De Cunto, Manny Case, Cinzia Zanetti, Jason Barnett, Michael S. Pack, Ron Pipes, Glen Eisner, Greg Funk	TNT
1998	Star Trek: Deep Space Nine	"Who Mourns for Morn?"	Camille Calvet, Michael Westmore, Dean Jones, Karen Iverson, Mark Bussan, Ellis Burman Jr., Karen Westerfield, Mary Kay Morse, Belinda Bryant, Joe Podnar, Suzanne Diaz, Jill Rockow, David Quashnick, Bernd Rantscheff	Syndicated
1998	Tracey Takes On...	"Culture"	Ron Berkeley, Kathleen Berkeley, Thomas R. Burman, Bari Dreiband-Burman	HBO
1998	The X-Files	"The Post-Modern Prometheus"	Laverne Munroe, Pearl Louie, Toby Lindala, Dave Coughtry, Rachel Griffin, Robin Lindala, Leanne Rae Podavin, Brad Proctor, Geoff Redknap, Tony Wohlgemuth, Wayne Dang, Vince Yoshida	Fox
1999	Outstanding Makeup for a Miniseries, Movie or a Special			
1999	Alice in Wonderland		Anne Spiers, James Kell, Duncan Jarman, Sandra Shepherd	NBC
1999	And the Beat Goes On: The Sonny and Cher Story		Susan A. Cabral, Joe Hailey	ABC
1999	Houdini		Matthew W. Mungle, Deborah La Mia Denaver, John E. Jackson	TNT
1999	Joan of Arc		Melissa Purino, Tomoko Hidaka	CBS
1999	The Rat Pack		Kandace Westmore, Judy Lovell, Marvin Westmore, Kevin Haney	HBO
1999	Outstanding Makeup for a Series			
1999	The X-Files	"Two Fathers/One Son"	Cheri Montesanto, Laverne Munroe, John Vulich, Kevin Westmore, Greg Funk, John Wheaton, Mark Shostrom, Rick Stratton, Jake Garber, Craig Reardon, Fionagh Cush, Steve La Porte, Kevin Haney, Jane Aull, Perri Sorel, Jeanne Van Phue, Julie Socash	Fox
1999	Buffy the Vampire Slayer	"The Zeppo"	Todd McIntosh, John Wheaton, Robin Beauchesne, Douglas Noe, Jamie Kelman, Craig Reardon, John Vulich, John Maldonado, Brigette A. Myre, Ed French, Blake Shepard, Erwin H. Kupitz	The WB
1999	Saturday Night Live	"Host: Brendan Fraser"	Louie Zakarian, Andrea Miller, Vincent J. Guastini	NBC
1999	Star Trek: Deep Space Nine	"The Dogs of War"	Camille Calvet, Michael Westmore, Dean Jones, Mark Bussan, Mary Kay Morse, Ellis Burman Jr., Belinda Bryant, Karen Iverson, Karen Westerfield, Brad Look, David Quashnick, Earl Ellis, Joe Podnar, R. Stephen Weber, Jeff Lewis, Sandi Rowden, Toby Lamm, Michael F. Blake, June Westmore, Judith Silverman, Craig Smith, Kevin Haney, Suzanne Diaz, Scott Wheeler, James Rohland, Tina Hoffman, Natalie Wood	Syndicated
1999	Tracey Takes On...	"America"	Ron Berkeley, Kathleen Berkeley, Thomas R. Burman, Bari Dreiband-Burman	HBO

=== 2000s ===
Year	Program	Episode	Nominees	Network
2000	Outstanding Makeup for a Miniseries, Movie or a Special			
2000	Arabian Nights	"Part 2"	Anne Spiers, Mark Coulier, Duncan Jarman, Diane Chenery-Wickens, Daniel Phillips	ABC
2000	Don Quixote		Anne Spiers, Gillian Thomas, Mauro Meniconi	TNT
2000	Geppetto		Patricia Messina, Tommy Cole, Charlene Osterman, Lisa Pharren, Michael Westmore, Earl Ellis, Mary Kay Morse	ABC
2000	Jason and the Argonauts	"Part 1"	Anne Spiers, Mark Coulier, Paul Spateri, Julie Wright, Nicky Knowles, Paul Gooch	NBC
2000	Jesus	"Part 2"	Fabrizio Sforza	CBS
2000	Outstanding Makeup for a Series			
2000	The X-Files	"Theef"	Cheri Montesanto, Kevin Westmore, Laverne Munroe, Greg Funk, Cindy J. Williams	Fox
2000	Angel	"The Ring"	Dayne Johnson, David DeLeon, Louis Lazzara, Steve La Porte, Rick Stratton, Jill Rockow, Toby Lamm, Jeremy Swan, Stephen Prouty, Earl Ellis, Dalia Dokter, Robert Maverick	The WB
2000	MADtv	"Movie Show"	Jennifer Aspinall, Felicia Linsky, Ed French, Myke Michaels, Randy Westgate, R. Stephen Weber, Susan A. Cabral, Courtney Carell, Julie Purcell	Fox
2000	Star Trek: Voyager	"Ashes to Ashes"	Michael Westmore, Scott Wheeler, Tina Hoffman, James Rohland, Suzanne Diaz, Natalie Wood, Ellis Burman Jr., David Quashnick, Belinda Bryant, Jeff Lewis	UPN
2000	That '70s Show	"Vanstock"	Mark Sanchez, Cindy Gardner, Jay Wejebe	Fox
2001	Outstanding Makeup for a Miniseries, Movie or a Special			
2001	Life with Judy Garland: Me and My Shadows		Pamela Roth, Debi Drennan, Kevin Haney	ABC
2001	Horatio Hornblower	"Mutiny"	Veyatie MacLeod, Suzan Broad	A&E
2001	Jackie Bouvier Kennedy Onassis		Nicole Lapierre, Leonard Engelman	CBS
2001	61*		Peter Montagna, Patricia Bunch, Mark Landon	HBO
2001	Voyage of the Unicorn	"Part 2"	Pearl Louie, Toby Lindala, Lance Webb, Felix Fox, Shane Zander, Vince Yoshida, Patrick Baxter, J.P. Mass, Jason Palmer, Wade Daily, Dan Sheehan	Odyssey
2001	Outstanding Makeup for a Series			
2001	The Sopranos	"Employee of the Month"	Kymbra Callaghan, Stephen Kelley	HBO
2001	The X-Files	"Deadalive"	Cheri Montesanto, Matthew W. Mungle, Laverne Munroe, Clinton Wayne, Robin L. Neal	Fox
2001	MADtv	"MADtv's 2nd Annual Salute to the Movies"	Jennifer Aspinall, Felicia Linsky, Stephanie L. Massie, Darrell McIntyre, Randy Westgate, Julie Purcell, Ed French, Susan A. Cabral, Myke Michaels	Fox
2001	Sex and the City	"Don't Ask, Don't Tell"	Judy Chin, Marjorie Durand, Nicki Ledermann	HBO
2001	Star Trek: Voyager	"The Void"	Michael Westmore, Tina Hoffman, Scott Wheeler, James Rohland, Suzanne Diaz, Natalie Wood, Ellis Burman Jr., Jeff Lewis, Brad Look, Belinda Bryant, Joe Podnar, David Quashnick, Karen Westerfield, Earl Ellis	UPN
2002	Outstanding Makeup for a Miniseries or a Movie (Non-Prosthetic)			
2002	The Mists of Avalon	"Part 1"	Polly Earnshaw	TNT
2002	Band of Brothers	"Why We Fight"	Liz Tagg, Nikita Rae	HBO
2002	Dinotopia	"Part 1"	Karen Dawson, Julie Dartnell, Sally Hennen, Eve Wignall	ABC
2002	Jack and the Beanstalk: The Real Story	"Part 2"	Pauline Heys, Catherine Heys, Julia Wilson	CBS
2002	James Dean		John M. Elliott Jr.	TNT
2002	Outstanding Makeup for a Series (Non-Prosthetic)			
2002	CSI: Crime Scene Investigation	"Slaves of Las Vegas"	Nicholas Pagliaro, Melanie Levitt, John Goodwin	CBS
2002	Alias	"Q&A"	Angela Nogaro, Diana Brown	ABC
2002	Buffy the Vampire Slayer	"Hell's Bells"	Todd McIntosh, Jay Wejebe, Carol Schwartz, Brigette A. Myre	UPN
2002	MADtv	"701"	Jennifer Aspinall, Scott Wheeler, Randy Westgate, Julie Purcell, Stephanie L. Massie, Felicia Linsky, Darrell McIntyre	Fox
2002	Six Feet Under	"Pilot"	Donna-Lou Henderson, Justin B. Henderson, June Bracken	HBO
2003	Outstanding Makeup for a Miniseries or a Movie (Non-Prosthetic)			
2003	Normal		Hallie D'Amore, Linda Melazzo, Dorothy J. Pearl	HBO
2003	Frank Herbert's Children of Dune		Jaroslav Samal, Dana Kohoutova	Sci Fi
2003	Helen of Troy		Giancarlo Del Brocco, Alfredo Tiberi, Cesare Paciotti, Federica Jacoponi	USA
2003	Napoléon		Muriel Baurens	A&E
2003	Rudy: The Rudy Giuliani Story		Jocelyne Bellemare, Stephan Dupuis, Cécile Rigault, Matthew W. Mungle	USA
2003	Outstanding Makeup for a Series (Non-Prosthetic)			
2003	Alias	"The Counteragent"	Angela Nogaro, Diana Brown, Kaori N. Turner	ABC
2003	CSI: Crime Scene Investigation	"Lady Heather's Box"	Nicholas Pagliaro, Melanie Levitt, John Goodwin, Jackie Tichenor	CBS
2003	MADtv	"801"	Jennifer Aspinall, Scott Wheeler, Randy Westgate, James Rohland, Julie Purcell	Fox
2003	Sex and the City	"Plus One Is The Loneliest Number"	Judy Chin, Nicki Ledermann, Kerrie R. Plant, Maryann Marchetti	HBO
2003	Six Feet Under	"Perfect Circles"	Donna-Lou Henderson, Justin B. Henderson, Megan Moore	HBO
2004	Outstanding Makeup for a Miniseries or a Movie (Non-Prosthetic)			
2004	Angels in America		J. Roy Helland, Joseph A. Campayno, John Caglione Jr., Kelly Gleason	HBO
2004	American Family: Journey of Dreams		Ken Diaz, Carlos Sánchez	PBS
2004	And Starring Pancho Villa as Himself		Dorothy J. Pearl, Nena Smarz	HBO
2004	Caesar		Manlio Rocchetti, Luigi Rocchetti	TNT
2004	The Reagans		Stephan Dupuis, Pamela Roth	Showtime
2004	Tracey Ullman in the Trailer Tales		Sally Sutton, Kate Shorter	HBO
2004	Outstanding Makeup for a Series (Non-Prosthetic)			
2004	Gilmore Girls	"The Festival of Living Art"	Marie Del Prete, Malanie J. Romero, Mike Smithson	The WB
2004	Carnivàle	"Babylon"	Steve Artmont, Simone Almekias-Siegl	HBO
2004	CSI: Crime Scene Investigation	"Assume Nothing/All for Our Country"	Nicholas Pagliaro, Melanie Levitt, John Goodwin, Jackie Tichenor	CBS
2004	Deadwood	"Here Was a Man"	John Rizzo, Adam Brandy, Brian McManus, Deborah McNulty	HBO
2004	Nip/Tuck	"Adelle Coffin"	Eryn Krueger Mekash, Stephanie A. Fowler, Thomas R. Burman, Bari Dreiband-Burman	FX
2005	Outstanding Makeup for a Miniseries or a Movie (Non-Prosthetic)			
2005	Frankenstein		Beatrix Dollingerova	Hallmark
2005	Lackawanna Blues		Edna Sheen, Denise Pugh-Ruiz, Karen Westerfield	HBO
2005	Reefer Madness		Victoria Down, Joann Fowler	Showtime
2005	Revelations		Julie Socash, Kandace Westmore, Richard Snell	NBC
2005	Warm Springs		Carla White, Donna M. Premick	HBO
2005	Outstanding Makeup for a Series (Non-Prosthetic)			
2005	Deadwood	"A Lie Agreed Upon, Part 1"	John Rizzo, Ron Snyder, Adam Brandy, Deborah McNulty	HBO
2005	Carnivàle	"Alamogordo, N.M."	Steve Artmont, Simone Almekias-Siegl, Heather Plott	HBO
2005	CSI: Crime Scene Investigation	"Ch-Changes"	Melanie Levitt, Matthew W. Mungle, Perri Sorel, Pam Phillips	CBS
2005	MADtv	"1004"	Jennifer Aspinall, Scott Wheeler, Randy Westgate, Nathalie Fratti	Fox
2005	Nip/Tuck	"Julia McNamara"	Eryn Krueger Mekash, Stephanie A. Fowler	FX
2006	Outstanding Makeup for a Miniseries or a Movie (Non-Prosthetic)			
2006	Bleak House		Daniel Phillips	PBS
2006	Into the West	"Ghost Dance"	Tarra D. Day	TNT
2006	Into the West	"Wheel to the Stars"	Gail Kennedy	TNT
2006	Mrs. Harris		Tina Roesler Kerwin, Elisa Marsh, Julie Hewett, Michele Baylis	HBO
2006	The Ten Commandments		Michele Baylis, Khalid Alami, Angie Mudge, Jennifer Harty	ABC
2006	Outstanding Makeup for a Series (Non-Prosthetic)			
2006	Black. White.	"Episode 1"	Brian Sipe, Keith VanderLaan, Will Huff	FX
2006	Grey's Anatomy	"Owner of a Lonely Heart"	Norman T. Leavitt, Brigitte Bugayong, Thomas R. Burman, Bari Dreiband-Burman	ABC
2006	MADtv	"1109"	Jennifer Aspinall, Heather Mages, Nathalie Fratti, David Williams	Fox
2006	Nip/Tuck	"Quentin Costa"	Eryn Krueger Mekash, Stephanie A. Fowler, Debbie Zoller, Michele Tyminski Schoenbach	FX
2006	Rome	"Caesarion"	Maurizio Silvi, Francesco Nardi, Federico Laurenti, Laura Tonello	HBO
2006	Will & Grace	"The Finale"	Patricia Bunch, Karen Kawahara, Farah Bunch, Greg Cannom	NBC
2007	Outstanding Makeup for a Miniseries or a Movie (Non-Prosthetic)			
2007	Bury My Heart at Wounded Knee		Gail Kennedy, Rochelle Pomerleau, Joanne Preece	HBO
2007	Broken Trail		Debbie Vandelaar, Tania El Zahr	AMC
2007	Desperate Crossing: The Untold Story of the Mayflower		Ronell Oliveri, Jason Allen	History
2007	Nightmares & Dreamscapes: From the Stories of Stephen King		Angela Conte, Kate Birch	TNT
2007	The Starter Wife		Vivien Mepham, Deborah Lanser	USA
2007	Outstanding Makeup for a Series (Non-Prosthetic)			
2007	Deadwood	"I Am Not the Fine Man You Take Me For"	John Rizzo, Ron Snyder, Bob Scribner, James R. Scribner	HBO
2007	CSI: Crime Scene Investigation	"Fannysmackin'"	Melanie Levitt, Tom Hoerber, Clinton Wayne, Matthew W. Mungle	CBS
2007	CSI: NY	"Wasted"	Perri Sorel, Rela Martine, James MacKinnon, John Goodwin	CBS
2007	Dancing with the Stars	"303"	Melanie Mills, Zena Shteysel, Patti Ramsey Bortoli, Nadege Schoenfeld	ABC
2007	MADtv	"1210"	Jennifer Aspinall, Heather Mages, James Rohland, David Williams	Fox
2007	Rome	"De Patre Vostro (About Your Father)"	Maurizio Silvi, Francesco Nardi, Federico Laurenti, Laura Tonello	HBO
2008	Outstanding Makeup for a Miniseries or a Movie (Non-Prosthetic)			
2008	Tin Man		Lisa Love, Rebecca Lee	Sci Fi
2008	The Andromeda Strain		Connie Parker, Jill Bailey, Lise Kuhr	A&E
2008	Comanche Moon		Tarra D. Day, Karen McDonald, Jessie Brown	CBS
2008	John Adams		Trefor Proud, John R. Bayless	HBO
2008	Outstanding Makeup for a Single-Camera Series (Non-Prosthetic)			
2008	Tracey Ullman's State of the Union	"102"	Sally Sutton, Matthew W. Mungle	Showtime
2008	CSI: Crime Scene Investigation	"Dead Doll"	Melanie Levitt, Tom Hoerber, Clinton Wayne, Matthew W. Mungle	CBS
2008	Grey's Anatomy	"Crash Into Me"	Norman T. Leavitt, Brigitte Bugayong, Shauna Giesbrecht, Michele Teleis-Fickle	ABC
2008	Mad Men	"The Hobo Code"	Debbie Zoller, Ron Pipes, Suzanne Diaz	AMC
2008	Pushing Daisies	"Dummy"	Todd McIntosh, David DeLeon, Brad Look	ABC
2009	Outstanding Makeup for a Miniseries or a Movie (Non-Prosthetic)			
2009	The Courageous Heart of Irena Sendler		Trefor Proud	CBS
2009	Gifted Hands: The Ben Carson Story		Angie Wells, Wynona Price	TNT
2009	Grey Gardens		Linda Dowds, Susan Hayward, Vivian Baker	HBO
2009	Maneater		Katherine James, Loretta James-Demasi, Melanie Hughes	Lifetime
2009	Outstanding Makeup for a Single-Camera Series (Non-Prosthetic)			
2009	Pushing Daisies	"Dim Sum Lose Some"	Todd McIntosh, David DeLeon, Steven E. Anderson	ABC
2009	Grey's Anatomy	"Dream a Little Dream of Me"	Norman T. Leavitt, Brigitte Bugayong, Michele Teleis-Fickle	ABC
2009	Little Britain USA	"106"	John E. Jackson, Chris Burgoyne, Matthew W. Mungle	HBO
2009	Mad Men	"The Jet Set"	Debbie Zoller, Denise DellaValle, Ron Pipes, Debra Schrey	AMC
2009	Nip/Tuck	"Giselle Blaylock and Legend Chandler"	Eryn Krueger Mekash, Stephanie A. Fowler	FX

=== 2010s ===
Year	Program	Episode	Nominees	Network
2010	Outstanding Makeup for a Miniseries or a Movie (Non-Prosthetic)			
2010	The Pacific		Chiara Tripodi, Toni French	HBO
2010	Georgia O'Keeffe		Dorothy J. Pearl, Sheila Trujillo-Gomez, Kelly Jefferson, Tarra D. Day	Lifetime
2010	Temple Grandin		Tarra D. Day, Meredith Johns	HBO
2010	You Don't Know Jack		Dorothy J. Pearl, John Caglione Jr.	HBO
2010	Outstanding Makeup for a Single-Camera Series (Non-Prosthetic)			
2010	Grey's Anatomy	"Suicide Is Painless"	Norman T. Leavitt, Brigitte Bugayong, Michele Teleis-Fickle	ABC
2010	Castle	"Vampire Weekend"	Debbie Zoller, Debra Schrey, Rebecca Alling, Steven E. Anderson, David DeLeon, Sara Vaughn	ABC
2010	Glee	"The Power of Madonna"	Eryn Krueger Mekash, Kelley Mitchell, Jennifer Greenberg, Robin L. Neal, Kelcey Fry, Zoe Hay	Fox
2010	Glee	"Theatricality"	Eryn Krueger Mekash, Kelley Mitchell, Trent Cotner, Jennifer Greenberg, Mike Mekash	Fox
2010	Mad Men	"Souvenir"	Lana Grossman, Ron Pipes, Maggie Fung, Kate Shorter, Bonita DeHaven, Angie Wells	AMC
2011	Outstanding Makeup for a Miniseries or a Movie (Non-Prosthetic)			
2011	The Kennedys		Linda Dowds, Amanda Terry, Colin Penman, Jordan Samuel	Reelz
2011	Cinema Verite		Mindy Hall, Kimberly Felix, Julie Hewett	HBO
2011	Mildred Pierce		Patricia Regan, Linda Melazzo	HBO
2011	The Pillars of the Earth		Colleen Quinton	Starz
2011	Outstanding Makeup for a Single-Camera Series (Non-Prosthetic)			
2011	Boardwalk Empire	"Boardwalk Empire"	Nicki Ledermann, Evelyne Noraz	HBO
2011	Game of Thrones	"Winter Is Coming"	Paul Engelen, Melissa Lackersteen	HBO
2011	Glee	"The Rocky Horror Glee Show"	Eryn Krueger Mekash, Jennifer Greenberg, Robin L. Neal, Mike Mekash	Fox
2011	Mad Men	"The Rejected"	Lana Grossman, Ron Pipes, Maurine Schlenz, Mary Kay Morse, Tricia Sawyer	AMC
2011	True Blood	"9 Crimes"	Brigette A. Myre, Lana Grossman	HBO
2012	Outstanding Makeup for a Miniseries or a Movie (Non-Prosthetic)			
2012	Hatfields & McCoys		Mario Michisanti, Francesca Tampieri	History
2012	American Horror Story		Eryn Krueger Mekash, Kim Ayers, Silvina Knight, D. Garen Tolkin	FX
2012	Hemingway & Gellhorn		Gretchen Davis, Kyra Panchenko, Paul Pattison	HBO
2012	Outstanding Makeup for a Single-Camera Series (Non-Prosthetic)			
2012	Game of Thrones	"The Old Gods and the New"	Paul Engelen, Melissa Lackersteen	HBO
2012	Boardwalk Empire	"Georgia Peaches"	Michele Paris, Mary Aaron, Steven Lawrence	HBO
2012	Glee	"Yes/No"	Kelley Mitchell, Jennifer Greenberg, Melissa Buell, Shutchai Tym Buacharern, Paula Jane Hamilton, Darla Albright	Fox
2012	Mad Men	"Christmas Waltz"	Lana Grossman, Ron Pipes, Ken Niederbaumer, Keith Sayer	AMC
2012	The Middle	"The Play"	Tyson Fountaine, Heather Cummings, Michelle Daurio, Tifanie White, Brian Kinney, Elizabeth Dahl	ABC
2013	Outstanding Makeup for a Miniseries or a Movie (Non-Prosthetic)			
2013	Behind the Candelabra		Kate Biscoe, Deborah Rutherford, Deborah La Mia Denaver, Christine Beveridge, Todd Kleitsch	HBO
2013	American Horror Story: Asylum		Eryn Krueger Mekash, Kim Ayers, Silvina Knight, John M. Elliott Jr.	FX
2013	Liz & Dick		Eryn Krueger Mekash, Kim Ayers, Myriam Arougheti	Lifetime
2013	Phil Spector		Chris Bingham, Hildie Ginsberg, John Caglione Jr.	HBO
2013	Ring of Fire		Jay Wejebe, Susan Ransom, Kimberly Jones	Lifetime
2013	Outstanding Makeup for a Single-Camera Series (Non-Prosthetic)			
2013	Game of Thrones	"Kissed by Fire"	Paul Engelen, Melissa Lackersteen, Daniel Lawson Johnston, Martina Byrne	HBO
2013	Boardwalk Empire	"Resolution"	Michele Paris, Steven Lawrence, Anette Lian-Williams	HBO
2013	The Borgias	"The Gunpowder Plot"	Vincenzo Mastrantonio, Katia Sisto, Federico Laurenti, Jekaterina Oertel	Showtime
2013	Glee	"Guilty Pleasures"	Kelley Mitchell, Jennifer Greenberg, Melissa Buell, Tanya Cookingham	Fox
2013	Mad Men	"The Doorway"	Lana Grossman, Ron Pipes, Ken Niederbaumer, Maurine Burke, Cyndilee Rice	AMC
2013	Once Upon a Time	"The Evil Queen"	Sarah Graham, Juliana Vit, Naomi Bakstad	ABC
2014	Outstanding Makeup for a Miniseries or a Movie (Non-Prosthetic)			
2014	The Normal Heart		Eryn Krueger Mekash, Sherri Berman Laurence, Nicky Pattison, LuAnn Claps, Mike Mekash, Carla White	HBO
2014	American Horror Story: Coven		Eryn Krueger Mekash, Kim Ayers, Vicki Vacca, Mike Mekash, Christopher Allen Nelson, Lucy O'Reilly	FX
2014	Anna Nicole		David DeLeon, Todd McIntosh, Amber Crowe	Lifetime
2014	Bonnie & Clyde		Trefor Proud, Karri Farris	Lifetime
2014	Fargo		Gail Kennedy, Joanne Preece, Gunther Schetterer, Keith Sayer	FX
2014	Outstanding Makeup for a Single-Camera Series (Non-Prosthetic)			
2014	True Detective	"The Secret Fate of All Life"	Felicity Bowring, Wendy Bell, Ann Pala, Kim Perrodin, Linda Dowds	HBO
2014	Boardwalk Empire	"New York Sour"	Michele Paris, Steven Lawrence, Anette Lian-Williams	HBO
2014	Breaking Bad	"Ozymandias"	Tarra D. Day, Corey Welk	AMC
2014	Game of Thrones	"Oathkeeper"	Jane Walker, Annie McEwan	HBO
2014	Mad Men	"The Runaways"	Lana Grossman, Ron Pipes, Ken Niederbaumer, Maurine Burke, Jennifer Greenberg	AMC
2015	Outstanding Makeup for a Limited Series or Movie (Non-Prosthetic)			
2015	American Horror Story: Freak Show		Eryn Krueger Mekash, Kim Ayers, Lucy O'Reilly, Mike Mekash, Christopher Allen Nelson, Jillian Erickson	FX
2015	Bessie		Debi Young, Mi Young, Ngozi Olandu, Noel Hernandez, Sian Richards	HBO
2015	Houdini	"Part 1"	Gregor Eckstein	History
2015	Olive Kitteridge		Christien Tinsley, Gerald Quist, Liz Bernstrom	HBO
2015	The Secret Life of Marilyn Monroe		Jordan Samuel, Patricia Keighran, Susan Reilly LeHane	Lifetime
2015	Outstanding Makeup for a Single-Camera Series (Non-Prosthetic)			
2015	Game of Thrones	"Mother's Mercy"	Jane Walker, Nicola Matthews	HBO
2015	Boardwalk Empire	"What Jesus Said"	Michele Paris, Joseph Farulla, Alexandra Urvois	HBO
2015	The Knick	"Method and Madness"	Nicki Ledermann, Stephanie Pasicov, Sunday Englis, Cassandra Saulter, Michael Laudati, LuAnn Claps	Cinemax
2015	Mad Men	"Person to Person"	Lana Grossman, Ron Pipes, Maurine Burke, Jennifer Greenberg	AMC
2015	Sons of Anarchy	"Faith and Despondency"	Tracey Anderson, Michelle Garbin, Sabine Roller, Tami Lane	FX
2016	Outstanding Makeup for a Limited Series or Movie (Non-Prosthetic)			
2016	American Horror Story: Hotel		Eryn Krueger Mekash, Kim Ayers, Mike Mekash, Silvina Knight, James MacKinnon, Sarah Tanno	FX
2016	All the Way		Bill Corso, Francisco X. Perez, Sabrina Wilson	HBO
2016	Fargo		Gail Kennedy, Joanne Preece, Gunther Schetterer, Danielle Hanson	FX
2016	The People v. O. J. Simpson: American Crime Story		Eryn Krueger Mekash, Zoe Hay, Heather Plott, Deborah Huss Humphries, Luis Garcia, Becky Cotton	FX
2016	Roots	"Night One"	Aimee Stuit, Christa Schoeman, Niqui da Silva, Paige Reeves, Marike Liebetrau	History
2016	Outstanding Makeup for a Single-Camera Series (Non-Prosthetic)			
2016	Game of Thrones	"Battle of the Bastards"	Jane Walker, Kate Thompson, Nicola Mathews, Kay Bilk, Marianna Kyriacou, Pamela Smyth	HBO
2016	The Knick	"Whiplash"	Nicki Ledermann, Stephanie Pasicov, Sunday Englis, Tania Ribalow, Rachel Geary, LuAnn Claps	Cinemax
2016	Penny Dreadful	"Glorious Horrors"	Enzo Mastrantonio, Clare Lambe, Caterina Sisto, Lorraine McCrann, Morna Ferguson	Showtime
2016	Vikings	"Yol"	Tom McInerney, Katie Derwin, Ciara Scannel	History
2016	Vinyl	"Pilot"	Nicki Ledermann, Tania Ribalow, Sunday Englis, Rachel Geary, Michael Laudati, Cassandra Saulter	HBO
2017	Outstanding Makeup for a Limited Series or Movie (Non-Prosthetic)			
2017	Feud: Bette and Joan		Eryn Krueger Mekash, Robin Beauschense, Tym Buacharern, Kim Ayers, Becky Cotton, David Williams	FX
2017	American Horror Story: Roanoke		Kim Ayers, Mike Mekash, Eryn Krueger Mekash, Silvina Knight, Carleigh Herbert, Luis Garcia	FX
2017	Big Little Lies		Steve Artmont, Nicole Artmont, Angela Levin, Molly R. Stern, Claudia Humburg	HBO
2017	Fargo		Gail Kennedy, Joanne Preece, Amanda Rye, Danielle Hanson	FX
2017	Genius	"Einstein: Chapter One"	Davina Lamont	Nat Geo
2017	Outstanding Makeup for a Single-Camera Series (Non-Prosthetic)			
2017	Westworld	"The Original"	Christien Tinsley, Myriam Arougheti, Gerald Quist, Lydia Milars, Ed French	HBO
2017	Penny Dreadful	"Perpetual Night"	Enzo Mastrantonio, Clare Lambe, Caterina Sisto, Lorraine McCrann, Morna Ferguson	Showtime
2017	Stranger Things	"Chapter Six: The Monster"	Myke Michaels, Teresa Vest	Netflix
2017	This Is Us	"I Call Marriage"	Zoe Hay, Heather Plott, Elizabeth Hoel-Chang, Judith Lynn Staats, John Damiani	NBC
2017	Vikings	"All His Angels"	Tom McInerney, Katie Derwin, Ciara Scannel, Lizzanne Procter	History
2018	Outstanding Makeup for a Limited Series or Movie (Non-Prosthetic)			
2018	The Assassination of Gianni Versace: American Crime Story		Eryn Krueger Mekash, Robin Beauchesne, Silvina Knight, David Williams, Ana Lozano, Tym Buacharern	FX
2018	American Horror Story: Cult		Eryn Krueger Mekash, Kim Ayers, Mike Mekash, Silvina Knight, Carleigh Herbert	FX
2018	Genius: Picasso		Davina Lamont, Hayden Bloomfield, Szandra Biro, Szilvia Homolya	Nat Geo
2018	The Last Tycoon	"Oscar, Oscar, Oscar"	Lana Horochowski, Maurine Burke, Key Lesa Nielsen Duff, Melissa Buell, Cyndilee Rice, Kelcey Fry	Amazon
2018	Twin Peaks		Debbie Zoller, Richard Redlefsen	Showtime
2018	Outstanding Makeup for a Single-Camera Series (Non-Prosthetic)			
2018	Westworld	"Akane No Mai"	Elisa Marsh, Allan A. Apone, Rachel Hoke, John Damiani, Ron Pipes, Ken Diaz	HBO
2018	Game of Thrones	"The Dragon and the Wolf"	Jane Walker, Kay Bilk, Marianna Kyriacou, Pamela Smyth, Kate Thompson, Nicola Matthews	HBO
2018	GLOW	"Money's in the Chase"	Lana Horochowski, Maurine Burke, Lesa Nielson Duff, Melissa Buell, Kristina Frisch	Netflix
2018	The Handmaid's Tale	"Unwomen"	Burton LeBlanc, Talia Reingold, Erika Caceres	Hulu
2018	This Is Us	"Number Three"	Zoe Hay, Heather Plott, Luis Garcia, Elizabeth Hoel-Chang, Tania McComas	NBC
2018	Vikings	"Homeland"	Tom McInerney, Katie Derwin, Lizzanne Procter, Ciara Scannel, Deirdre Fitzgerald, Kate Donnelly	History
2019	Outstanding Makeup for a Limited Series or Movie (Non-Prosthetic)			
2019	Fosse/Verdon		Debbie Zoller, Blair Aycock, Dave Presto, Sherri Laurence, Nicky Pattison Illum, Jackie Risotto	FX
2019	Chernobyl		Daniel Parker, Natasha Nikolic-Dunlop	HBO
2019	Deadwood: The Movie		Lana Horochowski, Maurine Burke, Lesa Nielsen Duff, Ron Pipes, Mary Kay Morse Witt	HBO
2019	Sharp Objects		Michelle Radow, Eric Rosenmann, Kate Biscoe, Karen Rentrop	HBO
2019	True Detective		John Blake, Francisco X. Perez, Debi Young	HBO
2019	Outstanding Makeup for a Single-Camera Series (Non-Prosthetic)			
2019	Game of Thrones	"The Long Night"	Jane Walker, Kay Bilk, Marianna Kyriacou, Nicola Matthews, Pamela Smyth	HBO
2019	American Horror Story: Apocalypse	"Forbidden Fruit"	Eryn Krueger Mekash, Kim Ayers, Mike Mekash, Silvina Knight, Jamie Leigh DeVilla	FX
2019	GLOW	"The Good Twin"	Lana Horochowski, Maurine Burke, Lesa Nielson Duff, Melissa Buell, Kristina Frisch	Netflix
2019	The Marvelous Mrs. Maisel	"We're Going to the Catskills!"	Patricia Regan, Claus Lulla, Joseph Campayno	Prime Video
2019	Pose	"Pilot"	Sherri Laurence, Nicky Pattison Illum, Chris Milone, Deja Smith, Lucy O'Reilly, Andrew Sotomayor	FX

=== 2020s ===
Year	Program	Episode	Nominees	Network
2020	Outstanding Contemporary Makeup (Non-Prosthetic)			
2020	Euphoria	"And Salt the Earth Behind You"	Doniella Davy, Kirsten Sage Coleman, Tara Lang Shah	HBO
2020	Big Little Lies	"She Knows"	Michelle Radow, Erin Rosenmann, Karen Rentrop, Molly R. Stern, Angela Levin, Simone Almekias-Siegl, Miho Suzuki, Claudia Humburg	HBO
2020	The Handmaid's Tale	"Mayday"	Burton LeBlanc, Alastair Muir	Hulu
2020	Ozark	"In Case of Emergency"	Tracy Ewell, Jillian Erickson, Jack Lazzaro, Susan Reilly Lehane	Netflix
2020	The Politician	"The Assassination of Payton Hobart"	Autumn Butler, Caitlin Martini Emery, Debra Schrey, Emma Burton	Netflix
2020	Schitt's Creek	"Happy Ending"	Candice Ornstein, Lucky Bromhead	Pop TV
2020	Outstanding Period and/or Character Makeup (Non-Prosthetic)			
2020	The Marvelous Mrs. Maisel	"It's Comedy or Cabbage"	Patricia Regan, Claus Lulla, Joseph A. Campayno, Margot Boccia, Michael Laudati, Tomasina Smith, Roberto Baez, Alberto Machuca	Prime Video
2020	American Horror Story: 1984	"The Lady in White"	Carleigh Herbert, Abby Lyle Clawson, Melissa "Mo" Meinhart, Lawrence Mercado	FX
2020	Hollywood	"Outlaws"	Eryn Krueger Mekash, Kim Ayers, Kerrin Jackson, Ana Gabriela Quiñonez	Netflix
2020	Pose	"Acting Up"	Sherri Berman Laurence, Nicky Pattison Illum, Chris Milone, Deja Smith, Jessica Padilla	FX
2020	Star Trek: Picard	"Stardust City Rag"	Silvina Knight, Robin Beauchesne, David Williams, Peter De Oliveira, Natalie Thimm	CBS All Access
2021	Outstanding Contemporary Makeup (Non-Prosthetic)			
2021	Pose	"Series Finale"	Sherri Berman Laurence, Nicky Pattison Illum, Charles Zambrano, Shaun Thomas Gibson, Jessica Padilla, Jennifer Suarez	FX
2021	Euphoria	"Fuck Anyone Who's Not a Sea Blob"	Doniella Davy, Tara Lang Shah	HBO
2021	The Handmaid's Tale	"Pigs"	Burton LeBlanc, Alastair Muir	Hulu
2021	Mare of Easttown	"Sore Must Be the Storm"	Debi Young, Sandra Linn, Ngozi Olandu Young, Rachel Geary	HBO
2021	The Politician	"What's in the Box?"	Sherri Berman Laurence, Nicky Pattison Illum, Charles Zambrano, Oslyn Holder, Amy Duskin	Netflix
2021	Outstanding Period and/or Character Makeup (Non-Prosthetic)			
2021	The Queen's Gambit	"Adjournment"	Daniel Parker	Netflix
2021	Halston	"Versailles"	Patricia Regan, Claus Lulla, Margot Boccia, Joseph A. Campayno	Netflix
2021	Ratched	"Pilot"	Eryn Krueger Mekash, Kim Ayers, Mike Mekash, Silvina Knight	Netflix
2021	Star Trek: Discovery	"Terra Firma, Part 2"	Shauna Llewellyn, Faye Crasto	Paramount+
2021	WandaVision	"Filmed Before a Live Studio Audience"	Tricia Sawyer, Vasilios Tanis, Jonah Levy, Regina Little	Disney+
2022	Outstanding Contemporary Makeup (Non-Prosthetic)			
2022	Euphoria	"The Theater and Its Double"	Doniella Davy, Tara Lang Shah, Alex French	HBO
2022	American Horror Stories	"Rubber(wo)Man"	Tyson Fountaine, Elizabeth Kellog, Elizabeth Briseno, Ron Pipes, Gage Munster, Heather Cummings, Michael Johnston, Lufeng Qu	FX
2022	American Horror Story: Double Feature	"Gaslight"	Eryn Krueger Mekash, Kim Ayers, Mike Mekash, Ana Gabriela Quinonez	FX
2022	Angelyne	"The Tease"	David Williams, Ron Pipes, Erin LeBre, Anne Pala Williams, Mara Rouse	Peacock
2022	Impeachment: American Crime Story	"The Assassination of Monica Lewinsky"	Robin Beauchesne, KarriAnn Sillay, Angela Moos, Erin LeBre, Kerrin Jackson	FX
2022	Ozark	"A Hard Way to Go"	Tracy Ewell, Kimberly Amacker, Susan Reilly Lehane	Netflix
2022	Outstanding Period and/or Character Makeup (Non-Prosthetic)			
2022	Pam & Tommy	"Jane Fonda"	David Williams, Jennifer Aspinall, Jason Collins, Abby Lyle Clawson, Mo Meinhart, Dave Snyder, Bill Myer, Victor Del Castillo	Hulu
2022	The First Lady	"Cracked Pot"	Carol Rasheed, Sergio López-Rivera, Valli O'Reilly, Chauntelle Langston, Milene Melendez	Showtime
2022	The Marvelous Mrs. Maisel	"How Do You Get to Carnegie Hall?"	Patricia Regan, Claus Lulla, Margot Boccia, Tomasina Smith, Michael Laudati, Roberto Baez, Alberto Machuca	Prime Video
2022	Star Trek: Picard	"Hide and Seek"	Silvina Knight, Tanya Cookingham, Peter De Oliveira, Allyson Carey, Hanny Eisen	Paramount+
2022	Stranger Things	"Chapter Two: Vecna's Curse"	Amy L. Forsythe, Devin Morales, Leo Satkovitch, Nataleigh Verrengia, Rocco Gaglioti, Lisa Poe, Benji Dove, Jan Rooney	Netflix
2023	Outstanding Contemporary Makeup (Non-Prosthetic)			
2023	Wednesday	"Woe What a Night"	Tara McDonald, Freda Ellis, Nirvana Jalalvand, Tamara Meade, Bianca Boeroiu	Netflix
2023	American Horror Stories	"Bloody Mary"	Tyson Fountaine, Ron Pipes, Gage Hubbard, Heather Cummings, Natasha Marcelina, Michael Johnston	FX
2023	Emily in Paris	"What's It All About..."	Aurélie Payen, Corinne Maillard, Joséphine Bouchereau, Sarah Damen, Ivana Carboni	Netflix
2023	The Last of Us	"Long, Long Time"	Connie Parker, Joanna Mireau	HBO
2023	Star Trek: Picard	"Võx"	Silvina Knight, Tanya Cookingham, Allyson Carey, Peter De Oliveira, Hanny Eisen, Kim Ayers	Paramount+
2023	The White Lotus	"That's Amore"	Rebecca Hickey, Federica Emidi, Francesca Antonetti, Rosa Saba	HBO
2023	Outstanding Period and/or Character Makeup (Non-Prosthetic)			
2023	The Marvelous Mrs. Maisel	"Susan"	Patricia Regan, Claus Lulla, Joseph A. Campayno, Michael Laudati, Tomasina Smith, Roberto Baez	Prime Video
2023	Dahmer – Monster: The Jeffrey Dahmer Story	"Bad Meat"	Gigi Williams, Michelle Audrina Kim	Netflix
2023	Daisy Jones & the Six	"Track 10: Rock 'n' Roll Suicide"	Rebecca Wachtel, Sherri Simmons, RJ McCasland, Kim Perrodin, Darla Edin	Prime Video
2023	House of the Dragon	"We Light the Way"	Amanda Knight, Hannah Eccleston, Heather McMullen, Kashiya Hinds, Harriet Thompson, Natalie Wickens, Bonny Monger	HBO
2023	The Mandalorian	"Chapter 22: Guns for Hire"	Cristina Waltz, Ana Gabriela Quinonez Urrego, Alex Perrone, Crystal Gomez	Disney+
2023	Stranger Things	"Chapter Nine: The Piggyback"	Amy L. Forsythe, Devin Morales, Erin Keith, Nataleigh Verrengia, Benji Dove, Jan Rooney, Lisa Poe, Rocco Gaglioti, Jr.	Netflix
2024	Outstanding Contemporary Makeup (Non-Prosthetic)			
2024	The Morning Show	"Strict Scrutiny"	Cindy Williams, Liz Villamarin, Angela Levin, Tracey Levy, Keiko Wedding, Amy Schmiederer	Apple TV+
2024	The Bear	"Fishes"	Ignacia Soto-Aguilar, Nicole Rogers, Justine Losoya, Zsofia Otvos	FX
2024	Hacks	"Yes, And"	Keith Sayer	Max
2024	Only Murders in the Building	"Opening Night"	Arielle Toelke, Kim Taylor, Joelle Troisi	Hulu
2024	True Detective: Night Country	"Part 5"	Peter Swords King, Natalie Abizadeh, Kerry Skelton, Flóra Karítas Buenaño, Hafdís Pálsdóttir	HBO
2024	Outstanding Period or Fantasy/Sci-Fi Makeup (Non-Prosthetic)			
2024	Shōgun	"The Abyss of Life"	Rebecca Lee, Krystal Devlin, Amber Trudeau, Andrea Alcala, Leslie Graham, Krista Hann, Mike Fields, Emily Walsh	FX
2024	The Crown	"Ritz"	Cate Hall, Emilie Yong-Mills	Netflix
2024	Fallout	"The Head"	Michael Harvey, Kimberly Amacker, David Kalahiki	Prime Video
2024	Feud: Capote vs. The Swans	"Beautiful Babe"	Jacqueline Risotto, Kristen Alimena, Christine Hooghuis, Kyra Panchenko	FX
2024	Palm Royale	"Pilot"	Tricia Sawyer, Marissa Lafayette, Kenny Niederbaumer, Marie DelPrete, Simone Siegl, Marja Webster	Apple TV+
2025	Outstanding Contemporary Makeup (Non-Prosthetic)			
2025	The Penguin	"Cent'Anni"	Martha Melendez, Kim Collea, Maria Maio	HBO
2025	Grotesquerie	"Unplugged"	Kate Biscoe, Tierra Richards, Victor Del Castillo, Naima Jamal	FX
2025	The Last of Us	"Day One"	Rebecca Lee, Krystal Devlin, Amber Trudeau, Leslie Graham, Jessica Wong, Chelsea Matthews	HBO
2025	Only Murders in the Building	"Valley of the Dolls"	Arielle Toelke, Kim Taylor, Joelle Troisi, Ana Sorys	Hulu
2025	The Pitt	"7:00 P.M."	Merry Lee Traum, Marie-Flore 'Ri' Beaubien, Leesa Simone	HBO Max
2025	The White Lotus	"Full-Moon Party"	Rebecca Hickey, Michelle Kearns, Wattana 'Geng' Garum, Vicky Nugent, Jeersak 'Jojo' Srinuan, Janejira 'Jibbie' Phanvichian	HBO
2025	Outstanding Period or Fantasy/Sci-Fi Makeup (Non-Prosthetic)			
2025	House of the Dragon	"The Red Dragon and the Gold"	Amanda Knight, Sara Kramer, Harriet Thompson, Bonny Monger, Helen Currie, Natalie Wickens, Vickie Ellis	HBO
2025	Anne Rice's Interview with the Vampire	"Do You Know What It Means to Be Loved by Death"	Vincenzo Mastrantonio, Daniele Nastasi, Adele Di Trani, Charlene Williams	AMC
2025	Monsters: The Lyle and Erik Menendez Story	"Brother, Can You Spare a Dime?"	Miho Suzuki, Sabrina Wilson, Michael Anthony Ornelaz, Ana Lozano	Netflix
2025	The Righteous Gemstones	"Prelude"	Leigh Ann Yandle, Nataleigh Verrengia, Alexander McPherson, Lori McCoy-Bell	HBO
2025	What We Do in the Shadows	"Come Out and Play"	Sarah Milk, Lorna Thibodeau, Cherie Snow, Heather Hollett-French	FX
2026	Outstanding Contemporary Makeup (Non-Prosthetic)			
2026	Margo's Got Money Troubles	"Grudge Match"	Erin Ayanian Monroe, Michele Teleis, Bonni Flowers, Valli O'Reilly, Angela Levin	Apple TV
2026	All's Fair	"Oh, Jesus!"	Kate Biscoe, Tierra Richards, Victor Del Castillo, Chloe Sens, Naima Jamal, Diana Shin	Hulu
2026	Euphoria	"Kitty Likes to Dance"	Doniella Davy, Tara Lang Shah, Mara Rouse, Leah Rial Sappington	HBO
2026	Hacks	"Hacks"	Brittany White, Keith Sayer, Erin Blinn, Veronica Rodarte	HBO Max
2026	The Pitt	"1:00 P.M."	Merry Lee Traum, Marie-Flore "Ri" Beaubien, Leesa Simone	HBO Max
2026	Wednesday	"Woe Me the Money"	Lynn Johnston, Elaine Hopkins, Helen Bailey, Dorothy Campbell	Netflix
2026	Outstanding Period or Fantasy/Sci-Fi Makeup (Non-Prosthetic)			
2026	Palm Royale	"Maxine Drinks Martinis Now"	Tricia Sawyer, Marissa Lafayette, Marie DelPrete, Rory Gaudio, Alyssa Goldberg, Marja Webster, Simone Almekias-Siegl	Apple TV
2026	Fallout	"The Strip"	Elisa Marsh, John Damiani, Jennifer Aspinall, Cynthia Hernandez, Kenneth Calhoun, Lisa Rocco, Sabine Roller Taylor, Josh Foster	Prime Video
2026	The Gilded Age	"My Mind Is Made Up"	Nicki Ledermann, Anette Lian-Williams, Jane DiPersio, Emily Maitland Marroquin, Mareike Mohmand	HBO
2026	Love Story: John F. Kennedy Jr. & Carolyn Bessette	"The Pools Party"	Milagros Medina-Cerdeira, Blair Aycock, D'angelo Thompson, Jill Karol	FX
2026	Monster: The Ed Gein Story	"The Babysitter"	Heather Koontz	Netflix

== Programs with multiple awards ==
5 awards

- Game of Thrones

3 awards

- The X-Files

2 awards

- American Horror Story
- Deadwood
- Euphoria
- The Marvelous Mrs. Maisel
- Star Trek: Deep Space Nine
- Star Trek: The Next Generation
- The Tracey Ullman Show
- Westworld

== Programs with multiple nominations ==
10 nominations

- American Horror Story

9 nominations

- Star Trek: The Next Generation

8 nominations

- Game of Thrones
- Mad Men

7 nominations

- Star Trek: Deep Space Nine

6 nominations

- CSI: Crime Scene Investigation

5 nominations

- Boardwalk Empire
- Glee
- The X-Files

4 nominations

- Alien Nation
- Babylon 5
- Beauty and the Beast
- Buffy the Vampire Slayer
- Deadwood
- Euphoria
- Grey's Anatomy
- The Marvelous Mrs. Maisel
- Nip/Tuck
- Star Trek: Voyager
- The Tracey Ullman Show

3 nominations

- American Crime Story
- Fargo
- The Handmaid's Tale
- Monster
- Pose
- Star Trek: Picard
- Stranger Things
- Tracey Takes On...
- True Detective
- Vikings

2 nominations

- Alias
- Amazing Stories
- American Horror Stories
- Big Little Lies
- Carnivàle
- Dr. Quinn, Medicine Woman
- Fallout
- Feud
- Genius
- GLOW
- Hacks
- House of the Dragon
- Into the West
- The Knick
- Kung Fu
- The Last of Us
- Only Murders in the Building
- Ozark
- Palm Royale
- Penny Dreadful
- The Pitt
- The Politician
- Pushing Daisies
- Rome
- Sex and the City
- Six Feet Under
- Tales from the Crypt
- This Is Us
- War and Remembrance
- Wednesday
- Westworld
- The White Lotus
