= List of awards and nominations received by Tracey Takes On... =

Tracey Takes On... is an HBO comedy series that ran for four seasons from 1996 to 1999, receiving multiple awards and nominations. The series won a total of seven Primetime Emmy Awards. The awards and nominations are listed below.

== Awards and nominations ==
=== American Comedy Awards ===
| Year | Category | Nominee | Result |
|---|---|---|---|
| 1997 | Funniest Female Performer in a TV Series (Leading Role) Network, Cable or Syndication | Tracey Ullman | Won |
| 1999 | Funniest Female Performer in a TV Series (Leading Role) Network, Cable or Syndication | Tracey Ullman | Won |
| 2000 | Funniest Female Performer in a TV Series (Leading Role) Network, Cable or Syndication | Tracey Ullman | Won |

=== CableACE Awards ===
| Year | Category | Nominee | Result |
|---|---|---|---|
| 1996 | Actress in a Comedy Series | Tracey Ullman | Won |
| 1996 | Variety Special or Series | Allan McKeown, Tracey Ullman, Dick Clement, Ian La Frenais, Jerry Belson, Kevin Berg, Kim Fuller, Jenji Kohan, Molly Newman, Gail Parent, Thomas Schlamme, Tony Sheehan | Won |

=== Costume Designers Guild Awards ===
| Year | Category | Nominee | Result |
|---|---|---|---|
| 2000 | Outstanding Contemporary Television Series | Jane Ruhm | Nominated |

=== Directors Guild of America Awards ===
| Year | Category | Nominee | Result |
|---|---|---|---|
| 1997 | Outstanding Directorial Achievement in Musical/Variety | Thomas Schlamme for "Romance" | Nominated |
| 1998 | Outstanding Directorial Achievement in Musical/Variety | Thomas Schlamme for "1976" | Nominated |
| 1998 | Outstanding Directorial Achievement in Musical/Variety | Don Scardino for "Vegas" | Nominated |
| 1999 | Outstanding Directorial Achievement in Musical/Variety | Dennie Gordon, Stewart Lyons (unit production manager), Carol L. Vitkay (first assistant director), Nina Halvorsson (second assistant director), Marla D. Saltzer (second assistant director) for "The End of the World" | Won |

=== GLAAD Media Awards ===
| Year | Category | Nominee | Result |
|---|---|---|---|
| 1997 | Outstanding TV - Individual Episode | for "Romance" | Won |
| 1999 | Outstanding TV - Individual Episode | for "Religion" | Won |

=== Golden Globe Awards ===
| Year | Category | Nominee | Result |
|---|---|---|---|
| 1997 | Best Performance by an Actress in a Television Series - Musical or Comedy | Tracey Ullman | Nominated |

=== Online Film & Television Association ===
| Year | Category | Nominee | Result |
|---|---|---|---|
| 1998 | Best Episode of a Cable Series | for "Smoking" | Nominated |
| 1998 | Best Makeup/Hairstyling in a Series | | Nominated |
| 1998 | Best Costume Design in a Series | | Nominated |
| 1998 | Best Host or Performer in a Variety, Musical, or Comedy Series | Julie Kavner | Nominated |
| 1998 | Best Writing in a Cable Series | | Nominated |
| 1998 | Best Direction in a Cable Series | | Nominated |
| 1998 | Best Ensemble in a Cable Series | | Nominated |
| 1998 | Best Actress in a Cable Series | Julie Kavner | Nominated |
| 1998 | Best Cable Series | | Nominated |
| 1998 | Best Ensemble in a Variety, Musical, or Comedy Series | | Won |
| 1998 | Best Host or Performer in a Variety, Musical, or Comedy Series | Tracey Ullman | Won |
| 1998 | Best Variety, Musical, or Comedy Series | | Won |
| 1998 | Best Actress in a Cable Series | Tracey Ullman | Won |
| 1999 | Best Makeup/Hairstyling in a Series | | Nominated |
| 1999 | Best Ensemble in a Variety, Musical, or Comedy Series | | Nominated |
| 1999 | Best Costume Design in a Series | | Won |
| 1999 | Best Host or Performer in a Variety, Musical, or Comedy Series | Tracey Ullman | Won |
| 1999 | Best Variety, Musical, or Comedy Series | | Won |

=== Primetime Emmy Awards ===
Tracey Takes On... was nominated for 30 Primetime Emmy Awards, winning a total of 7.

| Year | Category | Nominee | Result |
|---|---|---|---|
| 1996 | Outstanding Art Direction for a Variety or Music Program | Toby Corbett (production designer), Chez Cherry (art director), Keith Neely (art director), Sandy Struth (set decorator) for "The Best of Tracey Takes On..." | Nominated |
| 1996 | Outstanding Costume Design For A Variety Or Music Program | Jane Ruhm for "The Best of Tracey Takes On..." | Won |
| 1996 | Outstanding Hairstyling for a Miniseries or a Special | Audrey Futterman-Stern, Evelyn Rozenfeld for "The Best of Tracey Takes On..." | Nominated |
| 1996 | Outstanding Makeup for a Miniseries or a Special | Ron Berkeley, Kathleen Berkeley, Thomas R. Burman, Bari Dreiband-Burman (effects makeup artist) for "The Best of Tracey Takes On..." | Nominated |
| 1996 | Outstanding Individual Performance in a Variety or Music Program | Tracey Ullman for "The Best of Tracey Takes On..." | Nominated |
| 1996 | Outstanding Variety, Music or Comedy Special | Allan McKeown (executive producer), Tracey Ullman (executive producer), Kevin Berg, Kim Fuller, Molly Newman, Jenji Kohan, Gail Parent, Tony Sheehan, Thomas Schlamme, Ian La Frenais (supervising producer), Dick Clement (supervising producer), Allen J. Zipper (coordinating producer) for "The Best of Tracey Takes On..." | Nominated |
| 1996 | Outstanding Writing for a Variety or Music Special | Tracey Ullman, Dick Clement, Jenji Kohan, Molly Newman, Tony Sheehan, Jerry Belson, Kim Fuller, Ian La Frenais, Gail Parent, Allen J. Zipper | Nominated |
| 1997 | Outstanding Writing for a Variety or Music Program | Tracey Ullman, Jerry Belson, Dick Clement, Ian La Frenais, Allen J. Zipper, Robert Klane, Jenji Kohan, Molly Newman, Gail Parent | Nominated |
| 1997 | Outstanding Performance in a Variety or Music Program | Tracey Ullman for "Childhood" | Nominated |
| 1997 | Outstanding Hairstyling for a Series | Audrey Futterman-Stern for "Childhood" | Nominated |
| 1997 | Outstanding Directing for a Variety or Music Program | Thomas Schlamme for "1976" | Nominated |
| 1997 | Outstanding Art Direction for a Variety or Music Program | Toby Corbett, Chez Cherry, Kristen Toscano Messina for "Vegas" | Nominated |
| 1997 | Outstanding Variety, Music or Comedy Series | Allan McKeown, Tracey Ullman, Jerry Belson, Dick Clement, Ian La Frenais, Carey Dietrich, Thomas Schlamme, Robert Klane, Jenji Kohan, Molly Newman. Gail Parent, Stephanie Laing, Allen J. Zipper | Won |
| 1997 | Outstanding Makeup for a Series | Ron Berkeley, Kathleen Berkeley, Thomas R. Burman, Bari Dreiband-Burman for "Vegas" | Won |
| 1997 | Outstanding Costume Design for a Variety or Music Program | Jane Ruhm for "1976" | Won |
| 1998 | Outstanding Variety, Music or Comedy Series | Tracey Ullman, Allan McKeown, Carey Dietrich, Stephanie Laing, Dick Clement, Ian La Frenais, Gail Parent, Molly Newman, George McGrath, Jerry Belson | Nominated |
| 1998 | Outstanding Performance in a Variety or Music Program | Tracey Ullman | Nominated |
| 1998 | Outstanding Makeup for a Series | Ron Berkeley, Kathleen Berkeley, Thomas R. Burman, Bari Dreiband-Burman for "Vegas" | Nominated |
| 1998 | Outstanding Directing for a Variety or Music Program | Don Scardino for "Smoking" | Nominated |
| 1998 | Outstanding Art Direction for a Variety or Music Program | Toby Corbett, Chip Dox, Evette Knight for "Smoking" | Nominated |
| 1998 | Outstanding Hairstyling for a Series | Audrey Futterman-Stern for "Smoking" | Won |
| 1998 | Outstanding Costume Design for a Variety or Music Program | Jane Ruhm for "Sports" | Won |
| 1999 | Outstanding Variety, Music or Comedy Series | Tracey Ullman, Allan McKeown, Stephanie Laing, Jerry Belson, George McGrath, Dick Clement, Ian La Frenais, Gail Parent, Jenji Kohan | Nominated |
| 1999 | Outstanding Performance in a Variety or Music Program | Tracey Ullman | Nominated |
| 1999 | Outstanding Makeup for a Series | Ron Berkeley, Kathleen Berkeley, Thomas R. Burman, Bari Dreiband-Burman for "America" | Nominated |
| 1999 | Outstanding Costume Design for a Variety or Music Program | Jane Ruhm for "America" | Nominated |
| 1999 | Outstanding Choreography | Joseph Malone for "Drugs" | Nominated |
| 1999 | Outstanding Art Direction for a Variety or Music Program | Toby Corbett, Suzuki Ingerslev, Evette Knight for "Scandal" | Nominated |
| 1999 | Outstanding Art Direction for a Variety or Music Program | Chez Cherry, Suzuki Ingerslev, Evette Knight for "Obsession" | Nominated |
| 1999 | Outstanding Hairstyling for a Series | Audrey Futterman-Stern for "Hair" | Won |

=== Satellite Awards ===
| Year | Category | Nominee | Result |
|---|---|---|---|
| 1998 | Best Actress in a Series, Comedy or Musical | Tracey Ullman | Won |

=== Screen Actors Guild Awards ===
| Year | Category | Nominee | Result |
|---|---|---|---|
| 1999 | Outstanding Performance by a Female Actor in a Comedy Series | Tracey Ullman | Won |
| 2000 | Outstanding Performance by a Female Actor in a Comedy Series | Tracey Ullman | Nominated |

=== Writers Guild of America Awards ===
| Year | Category | Nominee | Result |
|---|---|---|---|
| 1997 | Comedy/Variety (Including Talk) - Series | Jerry Belson, Dick Clement, Kim Fuller, Jenji Kohan, Ian La Frenais, Molly Newman, Gail Parent, Tony Sheehan, Tracey Ullman, Allen J. Zipper for "Charity", "Nostalgia", "Family", "Royalty" and "Health" | Nominated |
