= Nitrium =

Nitrium may refer to:

- Nitrium, a variant of natrium, the original name for the chemical element sodium
- Nitrium, another name for a potash compound
- A material mentioned in the Star Trek: The Next Generation episode "Cost of Living"
