= Richard Bracken (film editor) =

American film editor (1930–2021)

- Born: August 3, 1930; Philadelphia, Pennsylvania, U.S.
- Died: February 11, 2021 (aged 90); Chatsworth, California, U.S.
- Education: University of Michigan
- Occupation: Film editor
- Children: 1

Richard Bracken (August 3, 1930 – February 11, 2021) was an American film editor. He was nominated for four Primetime Emmy Awards in the category Outstanding Picture Editing for his work on the television programs The Bold Ones: The Lawyers, Rich Man, Poor Man, Buffalo Girls and the television film A Case of Rape.

Bracken died on February 11, 2021, of kidney failure in Chatsworth, California, at the age of 90.
