= Gerald Quist =

American make-up artist

- Occupation: Make-up artist

Gerald Quist is an American make-up artist. He won five Primetime Emmy Awards and was nominated for eleven more in the category Outstanding Makeup for his work on the television programs Highway to Heaven, Star Trek: The Next Generation, Quantum Leap, American Playhouse, Buffalo Girls, Buffy the Vampire Slayer, Olive Kitteridge and Westworld and also the television film David.

== Filmography ==
- Wyatt Earp (1994)
- Mr. Holland's Opus (1995)
- Sgt. Bilko (1996)
- Last Man Standing (1996)
- The Jackal (1997)
- The Siege (1998)
- Breakfast of Champions (1999)
- The Whole Nine Yards (2000)
- Gigli (2003)
- Live Free or Die Hard (2007)
- Jonah Hex (2010)
