= Revelations (2005 TV series) =

2005 television miniseries by David Seltzer

- Genre: Apocalyptic; Drama
- Created by: David Seltzer
- Written by: David Seltzer; Mark Kruger
- Directed by: Lili Fini Zanuck; Lesli Linka Glatter; David Semel
- Starring: Bill Pullman; Natascha McElhone; Michael Massee; Mark Rendall; Chelsey Coyle; Brittney Coyle; John Rhys-Davies; Orla Brady; Alexa Nikolas; Tobin Bell; Martin Starr; Fred Durst; Caryn Green
- Composer: Joseph Vitarelli
- Country of origin: United States
- Original language: English
- No. of seasons: 1
- No. of episodes: 6

Production
- Executive producers: Gavin Polone; David Seltzer
- Producers: Jessika Borsiczky; James Bigwood; Jim Chory
- Cinematography: Joel Ransom; Brian J. Reynolds
- Editors: Gabriel Wrye; Lynne Willingham; Monty DeGraff; Juan Carlos Garza; Jill Savitt; Sondra Watanabe
- Running time: 43 minutes
- Production companies: Pariah Films; Stillking Films; NBC Universal Television Studio

Original release
- Network: NBC
- Release: April 13 – May 18, 2005

Revelations is a 2005 American apocalyptic drama television miniseries created by David Seltzer and based on the Book of Revelation. The series follows two central characters, an astrophysicist (Bill Pullman) and a nun (Natascha McElhone), in a race against time to see if the end of the world can be averted. It also stars Michael Massee, Mark Rendall, Chelsey Coyle, Brittney Coyle, John Rhys-Davies, Orla Brady, Alexa Nikolas, Tobin Bell, Martin Starr, Fred Durst, and Caryn Green.

== Synopsis ==
Dr. Richard Massey, a noted astrophysicist from Harvard, returns home after having hunted down the Satanist that brutally murdered his daughter Lucy in a satanic ritual. The Satanist, a man named Isaiah Haden, is put into prison awaiting trial. Richard Massey is a man of science and does not believe in religion at all. He is bitter at his loss and the general poor state of his life and only wants to see Isaiah Haden face his punishment.

Meanwhile, a nun named Josepha Montafiore who is working for the Eklind Foundation, a wealthy traditionalist Catholic organization, visits the bedside of a comatose girl. The child was struck twice by lightning while crossing a golf course and lives in a vegetative state. However, the girl mumbles Bible verses in Latin and draws cryptic drawings. Josepha believes that this is an act of God and decides to pursue it.

The girl's visions lead Josepha to Richard, who joins her on her quest to document and unravel signs of the End of Days. Their journey eventually becomes a race against time to thwart Haden's followers as they try to bring about the Apocalypse, all while hot on the trail of a child who may be able to save them all.

== Cast ==
- Bill Pullman as Dr. Richard Massey
- Natascha McElhone as Sister Josepha Montafiore
- Michael Massee as Isaiah Haden
- Mark Rendall as Henry "Hawk" Webber
- Chelsey Coyle as Olivia "Livvie" Beaudrey
- Brittney Coyle as Olivia "Livvie" Beaudrey
- John Rhys-Davies as Professor Lampley
- Orla Brady as Nora Webber
- Alexa Nikolas as Lucy Massey
- Tobin Bell as Nathan Volk
- Martin Starr as Mark Rubio
- Fred Durst as Ogden
- Caryn Green as Tulia
- Fionnula Flanagan as Mother Francine
- Jesper Christensen as Torvald Eklind
- Paul Venables as Tom Webber
- Jonathan Whittaker as Nelson Boyd
- Winter Ave Zoli as Anna-Theresa
- Clémence Poésy as E.C.
- Christopher Biggins as Cardinal Laveigh
- Werner Daehn as Asteroth
- Patrick Bauchau as Dr. Daniel Goran
- Davenia McFadden as Sister Delise
- Joel Polis as Hospital Administrator
- James Bigwood as Prison Chaplain

== Awards and nominations ==
Year	Award	Category	Nominee(s)	Result
2005	OFTA Television Awards	Best Direction of a Motion Picture or Miniseries	Lesli Linka Glatter; David Semel; Lili Fini Zanuck	Nominated
2005	BMI Film & TV Awards	BMI Television Music	Joseph Vitarelli	Won
2005	Primetime Creative Arts Emmy Awards	Outstanding Music Composition for a Miniseries or a Movie (Dramatic Underscore)	Joseph Vitarelli	Nominated
2005	Primetime Creative Arts Emmy Awards	Outstanding Makeup for a Miniseries or a Movie (Non-Prosthetic)	Richard Snell; Julie Socash; Kandace Westmore	Nominated
2005	Artios Awards	Outstanding Achievement in Mini-Series Casting	John Papsidera; Wendy O'Brien; John Buchan	Nominated
2005	Satellite Awards	Best Actress in a Miniseries or a Television Film	Natascha McElhone	Nominated
2005	Satellite Awards	Best Miniseries	Revelations	Nominated
2006	Saturn Awards	Best Television Presentation	Revelations	Nominated
