= Kevin Westmore =

American make-up artist

Kevin Westmore is a Hollywood make-up artist and part of the fourth generation of the Westmore family. The son of Marvin Westmore.Kevin Westmore has worked on a number of productions, including The X-Files (which he has won two Emmys for) and Demolition Man.

His more recent project was Department Head of 7th Heaven.

== Awards and nominations ==
Kevin Westmore has been nominated for ten awards throughout his career, four of which he has won. His most prestigious awards came from his work on television series The X-Files, where he won two Primetime Emmys for Outstanding Makeup (Non-Prosthetic) in both 1999 and 2000. He was also awarded a Hollywood Makeup Artist and Hair Stylist Guild Awards in 2000 for the same show.

Westmore was also nominated for five awards for his work on Nickelodeon TV series Danger Force, winning Best Makeup - Children and Teen Programming, in 2022. His other nomination came as a result of his work on Henry Danger.

== See also ==
- Westmore family
