= Linda de Vetta =

British make-up artist (born 1943)

Linda de Vetta (born 1943 in Hillingdon, London) known professionally as Linda Devetta is a professional makeup artist known for her lengthy career in both television and feature films.

== Early years and working life ==
After finishing secondary school, de Vetta worked as a hairdresser and secretary. 1963 saw the beginning of her career as a makeup artist when ATV Elstree employed her as a trainee. At ATV, she contributed to Emergency Ward 10 and Sunday Night at the London Palladium, major television shows of the period. She worked up to Senior Make-Up Artist before going freelance in 1966.

== Filmography ==
Charge of the Light Brigade was de Vetta's 1967 feature film debut. She subsequently worked on a number of high-profile films including Performance (1968), Ryan's Daughter (1969) and The Man Who Fell to Earth (1975), working alongside the leading directors and actors of the day. In the ensuing thirty years, she served as Chief Make-Up Artist on a number of high-budget films, including Indiana Jones and the Temple of Doom (1984), Alien Resurrection (1997), and Quantum of Solace (2008). In 2009, she also contributed to the film Avatar. De Vetta was the personal makeup artist to a number of leading film actors including Sigourney Weaver, Jeremy Irons, Faye Dunaway, and Angelina Jolie. She was also the makeup artist for the Rolling Stones video "Jumpin' Jack Flash".

== Legacy and later life contributions ==
In her later professional life de Vetta taught make-up design and is semi-retired as of 2020. In a later-life interview she has discussed her professional training at ATV, her experience of working in live television in Britain, and the television industry's initial colour productions and the technical challenges they presented for make-up artistry. De Vetta has also reflected on the difficulties encountered by women makeup artists working in the film industry during the 1960s, the professional adjustments demanded when filming on location, and the creative challenge of creating new prosthetics with specialised equipment.

== Impact and acknowledgment ==
De Vetta's professional trajectory is featured in Melanie Bell's Movie Workers, a comprehensive analysis of the proficient contributions made by female film technicians in Britain spanning from the 1930s to the 1980s. Bell characterises de Vetta’s choice to transition to commercials as a means of achieving a balance between her professional and personal life, a common feature of women's professional lives in the film industry of the 1960s and 1970s. Bell explains that when de Vetta became a mother, her job as a make-up artist became impossible to sustain in the feature film industry which demanded long working hours. As a result, she temporarily transitioned to working on commercials, where the hours were more manageable. The book highlights that women were primarily responsible for managing the demands of work and family life.

De Vetta's contributions to the field of make-up artistry have had a profound and enduring influence on the film industry, earning her widespread admiration and recognition from her peers. She won a Primetime Emmy Award for Outstanding Makeup in 1988 for her work on Poor Little Rich Girl: The Barbara Hutton Story, and a Primetime Emmy nomination in 1998 for her work on Snow White: A Tale of Terror.
