= Buffalo Girls (miniseries) =

1995 TV miniseries

- Genre: Western
- Written by: Larry McMurtry; Cynthia Whitcomb
- Directed by: Rod Hardy
- Starring: Anjelica Huston; Melanie Griffith
- Music by: Lee Holdridge
- Original language: English

Production
- Executive producer: Suzanne de Passe
- Producers: Sandra Saxon Brice; Suzanne Coston
- Cinematography: David Connell
- Editor: Richard Bracken
- Running time: 180 minutes
- Production companies: CBS Entertainment Production; De Passe Entertainment

Original release
- Network: CBS
- Release: April 30 – May 1, 1995

Buffalo Girls is a 1995 American Western television miniseries adapted from the 1990 novel of the same name by Larry McMurtry. Directed by Rod Hardy, it starred Anjelica Huston and Melanie Griffith, with, Sam Elliott, Gabriel Byrne, Peter Coyote, and Reba McEntire. It was nominated for two Golden Globe Awards and eleven Primetime Emmy Awards (winning one for Outstanding Sound Mixing for a Drama Miniseries or a Special). This miniseries was first aired on the CBS network over two consecutive nights during the spring of 1995.

== Synopsis ==
A story of the fading Wild West is told from Calamity Jane's point of view, with overlaid narrative to her eldest daughter about Jane's adventures.

== Cast ==
- Anjelica Huston as Calamity Jane
- Melanie Griffith as Dora DuFran
- Sam Elliott as Wild Bill Hickok
- Gabriel Byrne as Ted Blue
- Peter Coyote as Buffalo Bill Cody
- Tracey Walter as Jim Ragg
- Jack Palance as Bartle Bone
- Charlayne Woodard as Doosie
- Reba McEntire as Annie Oakley
- Floyd 'Red Crow' Westerman as No Ears
- Liev Schreiber as Ogden
- Russell Means as Sitting Bull

== Awards and nominations ==
Year	Award	Category	Nominee(s)	Result	Ref.
1995	Artios Awards	Best Casting for TV Mini-Series	Francine Maisler	Nominated	
1995	Primetime Emmy Awards	Outstanding Miniseries	Suzanne de Passe, Sandra Saxon Brice, and Suzanne Coston	Nominated	
1995	Primetime Emmy Awards	Outstanding Lead Actress in a Miniseries or a Special	Anjelica Huston	Nominated	
1995	Primetime Emmy Awards	Outstanding Supporting Actor in a Miniseries or a Special	Sam Elliott	Nominated	
1995	Primetime Emmy Awards	Outstanding Individual Achievement in Art Direction for a Miniseries or a Special	Cary White, Michael J. Sullivan, Alistair Kay, and Barbara Haberecht	Nominated	
1995	Primetime Emmy Awards	Outstanding Individual Achievement in Costume Design for a Miniseries or a Special	Van Broughton Ramsey	Nominated	
1995	Primetime Emmy Awards	Outstanding Individual Achievement in Editing for a Miniseries or a Special – Single Camera Production	Richard Bracken	Nominated	
1995	Primetime Emmy Awards	Outstanding Individual Achievement in Hairstyling for a Miniseries or a Special	Dorothy D. Fox, Lynda Gurasich, and Michael Kriston	Nominated	
1995	Primetime Emmy Awards	Outstanding Individual Achievement in Makeup for a Miniseries or a Special	Gerald Quist, Todd McIntosh, Del Acevedo, Hallie D'Amore, and Stephen Abrums	Nominated	
1995	Primetime Emmy Awards	Outstanding Individual Achievement in Music Composition for a Miniseries or a Special (Dramatic Underscore)	Lee Holdridge (for "Part 1")	Nominated	
1995	Primetime Emmy Awards	Outstanding Individual Achievement in Sound Editing for a Miniseries or a Special	G. Michael Graham, Joe Melody, J. Michael Hooser, Anton Holden, Mike Dickeson, Tim Terusa, Darren Wright, John K. Adams, Bob Costanza, Mark Steele, Gary Macheel, Rusty Tinsley, Richard Steele, Rick Crampton, Billy B. Bell, Tim Chilton, Jill Schachne, and Stan Jones (for "Part 1")	Nominated	
1995	Primetime Emmy Awards	Outstanding Sound Mixing for a Drama Miniseries or a Special	David Brownlow, Patrick Cyccone Jr., Edward F. Suski, and James G. Williams (for "Part 1")	Won	
1996	Cinema Audio Society Awards	Outstanding Achievement in Sound Mixing for Television – Movie of the Week, Mini-Series or Specials	David Brownlow, Patrick Cyccone Jr., Edward F. Suski, and James G. Williams (for "Part 1")	Nominated	
1996	Golden Globe Awards	Best Actress in a Miniseries or Motion Picture Made for Television	Melanie Griffith	Nominated	
1996	Golden Globe Awards	Best Supporting Actor in a Series, Miniseries or Motion Picture Made for Television	Sam Elliott	Nominated	
1996	Screen Actors Guild Awards	Outstanding Performance by a Female Actor in a Miniseries or Television Movie	Anjelica Huston	Nominated	
