= Dennis Liddiard =

American make-up artist

- Occupation: Make-up artist

Dennis Liddiard is an American make-up artist. He was nominated for an Academy Award in the category Best Makeup and Hairstyling for the film Foxcatcher.

Liddiard was the son of Gary Liddiard, a make-up artist who has worked on films such as The Great Gatsby and The Sting.

== Selected filmography ==
- Foxcatcher (2014; co-nominated with Bill Corso)
