= Michael Mills (make-up artist) =

- Other names: Mike Mills; Michael M. Mills; Michael John Mills; Michael J. Mills
- Occupation: Makeup artist
- Years active: 1982–present

Michael Mills is a makeup artist who has worked on over 40 different films and TV shows since 1982.

In 1991, Mills, along with colleagues Gerald Quist and Jeremy Swan, won the Primetime Emmy Award for Outstanding Makeup for a Single-Camera Series, for the Quantum Leap episode "The Leap Home (Part 1)".

In 1992, Mills, along with colleagues Edward French and Richard Snell, was nominated for the Academy Award for Best Makeup, for their work on the 1991 film Star Trek VI: The Undiscovered Country.

== Selected filmography ==
- Alien Nation (1988)
- Star Trek V: The Final Frontier (1989)
- Back to the Future Part II (1989)
- Back to the Future Part III (1990)
- Star Trek VI: The Undiscovered Country (1991)
- The Rocketeer (1991)
- Wyatt Earp (1994)
- Crimson Tide (1995)
- Courage Under Fire (1996)
- The X-Files: Fight the Future (1998)
- Mystery Men (1999)
- Monkeybone (2001)
- We Were Soldiers (2002)
- Hidalgo (2004)
- Secretariat (2010)
- Oz the Great and Powerful (2013)
- Heaven Is for Real (2014)

== Selected TV shows ==
- Star Trek: The Next Generation (1987–1994, 70 episodes)
- Dr. Quinn, Medicine Woman (1993–1994, 41 episodes)
- Star Trek: Deep Space Nine (1993–1996, 35 episodes)
- JAG (1996–2003, 55 episodes)
- Without a Trace (2002–2009, makeup department head for entire series)
- Hawaii Five-0 (2010–2011, 12 episodes)
- NCIS (2010–2015, 81 episodes)
- MacGyver (2017–2021, makeup department head seasons 2–5)
