= Scott Wheeler (make-up artist) =

American make up artist

Scott Wheeler is an American special makeup effects artist. who is known for his work in films. He was nominated for the Academy Award for Best Makeup for Star Trek: First Contact in 1996. He also twice won the Primetime Emmy Award for Outstanding Makeup (Non-Prosthetic).
