= John Vulich =

American make-up effects artist

- Born: 1961
- Died: October 12, 2016 (aged 54–55)
- Occupation: Make-up effects artist

John Vulich (1961 – October 12, 2016) was an American make-up effects artist and co-founder of Optic Nerve Studios.

== Early life ==
Vulich was born in Fresno, California. During high school he experimented with special effects and began corresponding with Tom Savini. Savini brought Vulich in as a personal assistant for the Friday the 13th series.

== Special effects career ==
Vulich continued working on 80's monster movies, including Ghoulies, Day of the Dead, and The Lost Boys. In 1989 Vulich decided to open his own company, Optic Nerve Studios, with Everett Burrell.

From there Vulich and the rest of Optic Nerve Studio would go on to work on well known science fiction and horror shows including Buffy the Vampire Slayer, Angel, The X-Files, and Babylon 5.

Vulich sold Optic Nerve Studio to Glenn Hetrick and went on to work in production at Disney Studios before dying of a heart attack on October 12, 2016.

== Awards ==
Year	Award	Title	Results	Ref
1991	Saturn Award for Best Make-Up	Night of the Living Dead	Nominated	
1993	Saturn Award for Best Make-Up	The Dark Half	Nominated	
1994	Primetime Emmy for Outstanding Individual Achievement in Makeup for a Series	Babylon 5	Won	
1995	Primetime Emmy for Outstanding Individual Achievement in Makeup for a Series	Babylon 5	Nominated	
1997	Primetime Emmy for Outstanding Makeup for a Series	Babylon 5	Nominated	
1997	Primetime Emmy for Outstanding Makeup for a Series	Buffy the Vampire Slayer	Nominated	
1998	Primetime Emmy for Outstanding Makeup for a Series	Babylon 5: In the Beginning	Nominated	
1998	Primetime Emmy for Outstanding Makeup for a Series	Buffy the Vampire Slayer	Won	
1999	Primetime Emmy for Outstanding Makeup for a Series	Buffy the Vampire Slayer	Nominated	
1999	Primetime Emmy for Outstanding Makeup for a Series	The X-Files	Won	
2002	Primetime Emmy for Outstanding Makeup for a Series (Prosthetic)	Buffy the Vampire Slayer	Nominated	
