= Edward French (make-up artist) =

American makeup artist

- Born: April 17, 1951 (age 75); Boston, Massachusetts
- Other names: Ed French; Ed Franch; Edward E. French
- Occupations: Makeup artist, audiobook narrator
- Years active: 1981–present

Edward French (born April 17, 1951) is an American makeup artist who has worked on over 70 films and television shows since 1981.

He was nominated at the 64th Academy Awards for Star Trek VI: The Undiscovered Country for Best Makeup. He shared his nomination with Michael Mills and Richard Snell.

In addition, he won an Emmy Award for his work on the TV show House.

French is also an audiobook narrator. He narrates horror fiction on his YouTube channel.

== Selected filmography ==
Year	Title
1982	Amityville II: The Possession
1983	Sleepaway Camp
1984	Exterminator 2
1984	C.H.U.D.
1986	Mutant Hunt
1986	Robot Holocaust
1987	Creepshow 2
1987	Blood Rage
1991	Star Trek VI: The Undiscovered Country
1991	Terminator 2: Judgment Day
1994	In Search of Dr. Seuss
2004	White Chicks
2006	The Black Dahlia
2007	The Invasion
2007	Walk Hard: The Dewey Cox Story
2009	Paul Blart: Mall Cop
2009	Terminator Salvation
