= Richard Snell (make-up artist) =

American make-up artist

- Born: Richard Alan Snell; December 19, 1955; San Francisco, California, U.S.
- Died: February 21, 2006 (aged 50); Freeport, The Bahamas
- Occupation: Make-up artist
- Years active: 1985–2006
- Spouse: Shantell Anna Snell (m. 2002)
- Children: 2

Richard Alan Snell (December 19, 1955 – February 21, 2006) was an American make-up artist. Known as a master of prosthetic makeup, he won two Primetime Emmy Awards and received an Academy Award nomination.

== Awards and nominations ==
=== Academy Awards ===
Year	Category	Nominated work	Result	Ref.
1992	Best Makeup	Star Trek VI: The Undiscovered Country	Nominated	

=== Primetime Emmy Awards ===
Year	Category	Nominated work	Result	Ref.
1990	Outstanding Makeup for a Series	"Chains of Love"; Alien Nation	Won	
1992	Outstanding Makeup for a Series	"Cost of Living"; Star Trek: The Next Generation	Won	
1995	Outstanding Makeup for a Miniseries or a Special	Alien Nation: Dark Horizon	Nominated	
1996	Outstanding Makeup for a Miniseries or a Special	Alien Nation: Body and Soul	Nominated	
1997	Outstanding Makeup for a Miniseries or a Special	Alien Nation: The Enemy Within	Nominated	
2005	Outstanding Makeup for a Miniseries or a Movie (Non-Prosthetic)	Revelations	Nominated	

== Death ==
Snell was found dead on February 21, 2006, in his hotel room in Freeport, The Bahamas after not reporting to work on the set of the film Pirates of the Caribbean: At World's End. He died in his sleep of natural causes at age 50.
