= Mark Sanchez (make-up artist) =

American make-up artist

- Other name: Mark R. Sanchez
- Occupation: Makeup artist
- Years active: 1980–present

Mark Sanchez is an American makeup artist. He was nominated at the 68th Academy Awards for Best Makeup. Sanchez was nominated for the film My Family, Mi Familia, sharing the nomination with Ken Diaz.

Sanchez was nominated for an Emmy Award for the makeup on That '70s Show. He won a Daytime Emmy for The Joan Rivers Show.
