= Bari Dreiband-Burman =

American make-up artist

- Occupation: Make-up artist
- Spouse: Thomas R. Burman

Bari Dreiband-Burman is an American make-up artist. She was nominated for an Academy Award in the category Best Makeup and Hairstyling for the film Scrooged. Dreiband-Burman also won five Primetime Emmy Awards and was nominated for eighteen more in the category Outstanding Makeup.

== Selected filmography ==
- Scrooged (1988; co-nominated with Thomas R. Burman)
