= Gregory Funk =

American make-up artist

- Occupation: Make-up artist

Gregory Funk is an American make-up artist. He was nominated for an Academy Award in the category Best Makeup and Hairstyling for the film The Way Back.

In addition to his Academy Award nomination, he won three Primetime Emmy Awards and was nominated for three more in the category Outstanding Makeup for his work on the television programs Babylon 5, The X-Files and Fallout.

== Selected filmography ==
- The Way Back (2010; co-nominated with Edouard F. Henriques and Yolanda Toussieng)
