= Valli O'Reilly =

American make-up artist

- Other names: Valle O'Reilly; Aunt Valli; Valli
- Occupation: makeup artist
- Years active: 1982-present

Valli O'Reilly is a make-up artist.

She won at the 77th Academy Awards for her work on the film Lemony Snicket's A Series of Unfortunate Events in the category of Best Makeup. She shared her win with Bill Corso.

In addition to her Oscar, she won a BAFTA award for the film Alice in Wonderland.

Valli also worked on Ant-Man and the Wasp (2018) and Avengers: Endgame (2019) as a makeup artist for Michelle Pfeiffer.

== Filmography ==
Year	Title	Designation
1978	Power Play	Makeup supervisor
1979	Fish Hawk	Makeup artist
1981	Porky's	Makeup artist
1983	Porky's II: The Next Day	Makeup artist
1984	Savage Streets	Makeup artist
1984	Heartbreakers	Makeup artist
1985	After Hours	Makeup artist
1985	Badge of the Assassin	Makeup artist
1987	Tonight's the Night	Makeup artist
1987	The Return of Bruno	Makeup artist: Bruce Willis
1987	Cherry 2000	Makeup artist
1988	Checking Out	Makeup artist / makeup supervisor
1988	Tales from the Hollywood Hills: Golden Land	Makeup department head
1988	Tales from the Hollywood Hills: Closed Set	Makeup artist
1989	Speed Zone	Makeup artist
1989	Sweet Bird of Youth	Makeup artist
1990	Pacific Heights	Key makeup artist
1991	Cold Heaven	Makeup artist
1992	Shining Through	Makeup artist: Ms. Griffith
1992	The Mambo Kings	Makeup department head
1992	Willing to Kill: The Texas Cheerleader Story	Makeup artist: Lesley Ann Warren
1993	The Pickle	Makeup artist
1993	The Joy Luck Club	Makeup designer
1994	Love Affair	Makeup department head
1994	Junior	Makeup artist: Ms. Thompson
1995	How to Make an American Quilt	Makeup artist
1995	The American President	Makeup artist: Annette Bening
1996	The Crow: City of Angels	Makeup department head
1996	Mars Attacks!	Key makeup artist
1998	Bulworth	Key makeup artist
1998	Living Out Loud	Key makeup artist
1998	Judas Kiss	Makeup artist: Ms. Thompson
1999	Crazy in Alabama	Makeup artist: Melanie Griffith
2000	Bless the Child	Makeup artist: Kim Basinger
2000	The Family Man	Makeup department head
2001	Town & Country	Makeup artist: Warren Beatty
2002	Murder by Numbers	Key makeup artist
2002	S1m0ne	Makeup department head
2002	8 Mile	Makeup artist: Kim Basinger - uncredited
2003	Bruce Almighty	Makeup department head
2004	Along Came Polly	Makeup artist: Jennifer Aniston
2004	The Door in the Floor	Makeup artist: Kim Basinger
2004	Meet the Fockers	Makeup artist: Dustin Hoffman
2004	Lemony Snicket's A Series of Unfortunate Events	Makeup department head
2005	Rumor Has It...	Makeup artist: Ms. Aniston
2006	You, Me and Dupree	Makeup artist: Kate Hudson
2006	Perfume: The Story of a Murderer	Hair stylist: Dustin Hoffman / makeup artist: Dustin Hoffman
2006	Stranger Than Fiction	Makeup artist: Mr. Hoffman
2007	Mr. Magorium's Wonder Emporium	Makeup artist: Dustin Hoffman
2007	The Bucket List	Makeup department head
2008	Last Chance Harvey	Makeup artist: Mr. Hoffman
2010	The Kids Are All Right	Co-makeup department head personal makeup artist: Annette Bening
2010	Alice in Wonderland	Makeup department head makeup designer
2010	Barney's Version	Makeup artist: Mr. Hoffman
2010	Little Fockers	Makeup artist: Mr. Hoffman, additional photography
2011	Tilda	Makeup department head
2012	This Is 40	Personal makeup artist: Leslie Mann
2013	The Face of Love	Makeup department head
2014	Chef	Additional makeup artist makeup artist: Dustin Hoffman
2014	Inherent Vice	Additional makeup artist
2015	Pariah	Key makeup artist
2016	Triple 9	Key makeup artist: LA - as Valli O'Rielly makeup department head: LA Unit
2016	The Nice Guys	Makeup artist: Los Angeles
2016	Distant Vision	Makeup department head
2016	Rules Don't Apply	Makeup department head
2017	All I Wish	Personal makeup artist: Sharon Stone
2017	Spielberg	TV movie documentary hair/makeup
2018	Ant-Man and the Wasp	Makeup artist: Ms. Pfeiffer
2019	Fighting with My Family	Additional makeup artist: Los Angeles Unit
2019	Avengers: Endgame	Makeup artist: Ms. Pfeiffer
2019	Maleficent: Mistress of Evil	Personal makeup artist: Miss Pfeiffer
2020	French Exit	Personal makeup artist: Ms. Pfeiffer
2020	Mank	Makeup artist
