= Bill Corso =

Makeup artist

- Other names: Billy Corso, William Corso
- Occupation: Makeup artist
- Years active: 1986–present
- Spouse: Odile Corso (October 3, 1999–present)

Bill Corso is an Academy Award-winning makeup artist who has worked on over 70 films since 1986.

Corso is a graduate of Booker High School in Sarasota, Florida where he participated in the school's Visual and Performing Arts program.

== Oscars ==
Corso has won one Oscar out of three nominations, all of which were in the category of Best Makeup

- 77th Academy Awards – Lemony Snicket's A Series of Unfortunate Events (Shared with Valli O'Reilly) (won)
- 79th Academy Awards – Click (Nomination shared with Kazuhiro Tsuji) (lost to Pan's Labyrinth)
- 87th Academy Awards – Foxcatcher (Nomination shared with Dennis Liddiard) (lost to The Grand Budapest Hotel)
