= Mike Smithson (make-up artist) =

- Born: Woodstock, Illinois, U.S.
- Occupation: makeup artist
- Years active: 1985–present

Mike Smithson is an American make-up artist who has over 80 credits to him. He has done films such as Men in Black III, Star Trek, How the Grinch Stole Christmas, Avatar and Lincoln among many other big named films.

One of his first jobs was on the Disneyland 3D attraction Captain EO.

He received an Oscar nomination during the 72nd Academy Awards for the film Austin Powers: The Spy Who Shagged Me in the category of Best Makeup. He shared the nomination with Michèle Burke.

He also won an Emmy Award for the TV show Gilmore Girls, which he was previously nominated for Star Trek: The Next Generation and Star Trek: Deep Space Nine.
