= Edouard F. Henriques =

Make-up artist

- Other name: Edouard F. Henriques III
- Occupation: makeup artist
- Years active: 1977–present

Edouard F. Henriques is a professional make-up artist with over 70 film and TV credits.

== Oscars ==
All of these were in the category of for Best Makeup

- 73rd Academy Awards-Nominated for The Cell. Nomination shared with Michèle Burke. Lost to How the Grinch Stole Christmas.
- 76th Academy Awards-Nominated for Master and Commander: The Far Side of the World. Nomination shared with Yolanda Toussieng. Lost to The Lord of the Rings: The Return of the King.
- 83rd Academy Awards-Nominated for The Way Back. Nomination shared with Gregory Funk and Yolanda Toussieng. Lost to The Wolfman.
