= Cost of Living (Star Trek: The Next Generation) =

- Star Trek: The Next Generation episode
- Episode no.: Season 5 Episode 20
- Directed by: Winrich Kolbe
- Written by: Peter Allan Fields
- Production code: 220
- Original air date: April 20, 1992

Guest appearances
- Majel Barrett as Lwaxana Troi / Computer Voice; Brian Bonsall as Alexander Rozhenko; Tony Jay as Campio; Carel Struycken as Mr Homn; David Oliver as Young Man; Albie Selznick as The Juggler; Patrick Cronin as Erko; Tracey D'Arcy as Young Woman; George Ede as Poet; Christopher Halsted as First Learner

Episode chronology
← Previous "The First Duty"	Next → "The Perfect Mate"
- Star Trek: The Next Generation season 5

"Cost of Living" is the 20th episode of the fifth season of the American science fiction television show Star Trek: The Next Generation, and the 120th episode overall of the series. Cost of Living was broadcast in syndication on April 20, 1992.

Set in the 24th century, the series follows the adventures of the Starfleet crew of the Federation starship Enterprise-D. In this episode, as undetectable parasites devour the ship, Lwaxana Troi takes Worf's son Alexander Rozhenko under her wing encouraging him to adopt her carefree ways en route to meeting a man she's blindly agreed to marry.

The episode won two Primetime Emmy Awards. One for Individual Achievement in Costume Design for a Series and another for Individual Achievement in Makeup for a Series.

== Plot ==
"The higher the fewer!"

— The Poet, holodeck character played by George Ede

Lwaxana Troi arrives on the Enterprise, announcing that she will be holding her wedding there with a man that shares many interests with her, as judged by a computerized matchmaking system. Captain Jean-Luc Picard, initially wary of Lwaxana's plans, is relieved that all she wants from him is to give her away as the bride. Deanna Troi talks to her mother Lwaxana about the marriage, and while she is happy that she is marrying again, she is surprised and disappointed that she will not follow the Betazoid custom of being a naked bride at the wedding. Lwaxana informs her that such customs offend the groom and his people. Deanna criticizes her for abandoning her own custom given the rank that she holds.

Meanwhile, Worf is having difficulties in getting his son Alexander to complete his obligations such as homework and chores. Deanna offers the idea of creating a contract that would allow Alexander to have time to play after completing his tasks. While this initially seems to be acceptable to Alexander, Lwaxana arrives and downplays the idea. Lwaxana makes friends with Alexander, taking him to a holodeck simulation of the Parallax colony despite Worf's orders. Lwaxana encourages Alexander to be a free spirit, but Deanna believes that Lwaxana's message is confusing Alexander.

Eventually, Campio, Lwaxana's husband-to-be, arrives at the Enterprise, and Lwaxana finds that he is not as perfect a fit for her as the computer match suggested, being more strict and demanding than she was led to believe. She evades Campio by taking Alexander to the holodeck. There, Alexander reiterates some of the advice she had previously given him. Taking it to heart, Lwaxana arrives at the wedding naked as per Betazoid custom, and Campio, offended, leaves her at the altar. Lwaxana winks at Alexander, who smiles in turn.

During these events, the Enterprise becomes infected with an undetectable parasite that feeds off nitrium, a component used in most of the starship's materials. Though initial system failures are attributed to normal wear, they become concerned when warp and life support systems begin to fail. The crew is able to identify the parasite, and as life systems fail and cause the crew to pass out due to lack of air. Data, who is able to function without oxygen, navigates the starship to a nearby asteroid field rich in nitrium and coerces the parasite to move there. Ship systems are quickly restored to normal before the wedding.

Afterwards Lwaxana relaxes in the holodeck-simulated Parallax colony mudbaths along with Deanna, Alexander, and Worf. Lwaxana admits she made a mistake with Campio and thanks Alexander for helping her out. Meanwhile, a confused and annoyed Worf asks, "You're just supposed to sit here?"

== Reception ==
In 2011, The A.V. Club gave this episode a "C" lamenting "Alexander is still insanely annoying" and was unhappy with many other elements in the episode offering a tour de force of complaints. Keith DeCandido of Tor.com rated it 4 out of 10.

This episode was noted in 2018 by TheGamer, for including "sad acrobats, hairy dudes in mud baths and mute dancers" and a floating clown-head on the holodeck, ranking it as the 21st creepiest scene in all Star Trek.

== Awards ==
The episode won two Primetime Emmy Awards, one for Individual Achievement in Costume Design for a Series and another for Individual Achievement in Makeup for a Series.
