= Trefor Proud =

- Occupation: makeup artist
- Years active: 1989-present
- Website: http://www.treforproud.com

Trefor Proud is a make-up artist who trained at Delamar Academy of Make-up & Hair, London. He won an Academy Award in the category of Best Makeup during the 72nd Academy Awards. He won for the film Topsy-Turvy. He shared his win with Christine Blundell.

He also has won two Emmy awards, for The Courageous Heart of Irena Sendler and John Adams.

He has worked on over 50 films and TV shows. Which include Gladiator, Star Wars: Episode I – The Phantom Menace, The Gospel of John and Ender's Game. He also did several episodes of NCIS: Los Angeles.
