= Thomas R. Burman =

American make-up artist (born 1940)

- Born: Thomas Robert Burman; November 28, 1940 (age 85); Los Angeles, California, U.S.
- Occupation: Make-up artist
- Spouse(s): Sandy Burman; Bari Dreiband-Burman
- Children: Barney Burman

Thomas Robert Burman (born November 28, 1940) is an American make-up artist. He was nominated for an Academy Award in the category Best Makeup and Hairstyling for the film Scrooged. Burman also won five Primetime Emmy Awards and was nominated for nine more in the Outstanding Prosthetic Makeup and Outstanding Makeup (Non-Prosthetic) categories.

== Selected filmography ==
- Scrooged (1988; co-nominated with Bari Dreiband-Burman)
- Meet the Hollowheads (1989; written and directed)
