= Greg Nelson (make-up artist) =

Make-up artist

- Occupation: makeup artist
- Years active: 1986-present

Greg Nelson is a make-up artist who was nominated at the 62nd Academy Awards in the category of Best Makeup for his work on the film Dad. He shared his nomination with Ken Diaz and Dick Smith.

In addition he has won a couple Emmy's, including one for Star Trek: Voyager.

== Selected filmography ==
- Ratboy (1986)
- Harry and the Hendersons (1987)
- Dad (1989)
- The Rocketeer (1991)
- Batman Returns (1992)
- Death Becomes Her (1992)
- Toys (1992)
- Stargate (1994)
- Wolf (1994)
- The X-Files: Fight the Future (1998)
- Dr. Seuss' How the Grinch Stole Christmas (2000)
- A.I. Artificial Intelligence (2001)
- The Time Machine (2002)
- The Last Samurai (2003)
- The Aviator (2004)
- Tropic Thunder (2008)
