= Ken Diaz =

American make-up artist

- Born: Kenneth Diaz
- Occupation: Makeup artist
- Years active: 1980–present

Kenneth Diaz is an American make-up artist who has been nominated for 2 Academy Awards for makeup. As well as winning an Emmy for the makeup in Star Trek: The Next Generation. He has done over 80 films and TV shows, including The Passion of the Christ and The Pirates of the Caribbean films.

== Oscar nominations ==
All were in Best Makeup

- 62nd Academy Awards: Nominated for Dad. Nomination shared with Dick Smith and Greg Nelson. Lost to Driving Miss Daisy.
- 68th Academy Awards: Nominated for My Family, Mi Familia. Nomination shared with Mark Sanchez. Lost to Braveheart.
- 98th Academy Awards: Nominated for Sinners. Nomination shared with Mike Fontaine and Shunika Terry.

== Selected filmography ==
- Spaceballs (1987)
- Dad (1989)
- Junoon (Bollywood Movie)
- My Family, Mi Familia (1995)
- Blade (1998)
- Pirates of the Caribbean: The Curse of the Black Pearl (2003)
- Pirates of the Caribbean: Dead Man's Chest (2006)
- Pirates of the Caribbean: At World's End (2007)
- Indiana Jones and the Kingdom of the Crystal Skull (2008)
