= Rick Stratton =

American make-up and special effects artist

Rick Stratton is an American make-up and special effects artist. He won an Primetime Emmy Award in 1999 for his work on The X-Files and in 1990 for his work on Alien Nation. Stratton has been nominated a total of eight times. His other work includes Pirates of the Caribbean, Star Trek: The Motion Picture, Beetlejuice, Jarhead, War of the Worlds and How the Grinch Stole Christmas.
