= Beetlejuice (disambiguation) =

Beetlejuice or beetle juice, may also refer to:

== Beetlejuice franchise ==
- Beetlejuice (franchise), an American fantasy horror comedy franchise of film, TV, stage, videogames
- Beetlejuice (character), the titular character in the media franchise

=== Film ===
- Beetlejuice, a 1988 American fantasy horror comedy film directed by Tim Burton
- Beetlejuice Beetlejuice, a 2024 sequel to the 1988 film

=== Television ===
- Beetlejuice (TV series), a 1989–1991 animated series based on the 1988 film

=== Video games ===
- Beetlejuice (1990 video game), a 1990 MS-DOS video game based on the 1988 film
- Beetlejuice (1991 video game), a 1991 NES video game based on the 1988 film
- Beetlejuice (1992 video game), a 1992 video game for Nintendo Game Boy based on the 1989-1991 animated series

=== Stage musical ===
- Beetlejuice (musical), a 2018 musical based on the 1988 film

== People with the nickname ==
- Lori Lightfoot, 56th mayor of Chicago, pejoratively compared to and nicknamed "Beetlejuice" by some critics
- Beetlejuice (wrestler), a ring name of the professional wrestler Art Barr
- Beetlejuice (entertainer), an entertainer seen on The Howard Stern Show, real name Lester Green
- Bettle Juice (musician), former stagename of the Canadian rapper Livestock (rapper)

== Other uses ==
- "Beetle Juice" (episode), 2009 episode of 16×9; see List of 16×9 episodes

== See also ==
- Betelgeuse (disambiguation)
- Beatlejuice, a Beatles cover band
- Bug juice (disambiguation)
