= List of awards and nominations received by Danny Elfman =

Danny Elfman awards and nominations
Awards and nominations
Award	Wins	Nominations
Academy Awards	0	4
Annie Awards	0	1
BMI Film & Television Awards	25	25
British Academy Film Awards	0	2
Broadcast Film Critics Association Awards	0	2
Chicago Film Critics Association Awards	0	4
Emmy Awards	3	5
Golden Globe Awards	0	3
Grammy Awards	1	11
Phoenix Film Critics Society Awards	0	1
Satellite Awards	1	6
Saturn Awards	7	16
Sierra Awards	1	2
World Soundtrack Awards	0	13
20/20 Awards	4	8

Totals (Note: Certain award groups do not simply award one winner. They acknowledge several different recipients, have runners-up, and have third place. Since this is a specific recognition and is different from losing an award, runner-up mentions are considered wins in this award tally. For simplification and to avoid errors, each award in this list has been presumed to have had a prior nomination.)
- Wins: 79
- Nominations: 105

Danny Elfman is an American musician, singer-songwriter, and composer. He led the rock band Oingo Boingo from 1976 until its breakup in 1995, but is most known for composing "The Simpsons Theme" and numerous film scores for director and producer Tim Burton, including Pee-wee's Big Adventure (1985), Beetlejuice (1988), Batman (1989), Edward Scissorhands (1990), Batman Returns (1992), The Nightmare Before Christmas (1993), Mars Attacks! (1996), Sleepy Hollow (1999), Planet of the Apes (2001), Big Fish (2003), Charlie and the Chocolate Factory (2005), Corpse Bride (2005), and 9 (2009). Elfman has composed scores for dozens of additional films, a few of which have charted on the Billboard 200 (Batman peaked at #30, Dick Tracy peaked at #194, and Batman Returns peaked at #61).

Elfman's first major recognitions occurred in 1989, when he was nominated by the Emmy Awards for Outstanding Main Title Theme Music for "The Simpsons Theme" and by the Grammy Awards for his film score to Batman (Best Instrumental Composition for the "Title Theme" and Best Score Soundtrack Album for a Motion Picture for the score). From these nominations, he won the Grammy for Best Instrumental Composition. Elfman has been nominated a total of four times by the Academy Awards (including twice for two different scores in 1997), twice by the Emmy Awards and Golden Globe Awards, ten times by the Grammy Awards, five times by the Saturn Awards (from which he won seven awards), and once each by the Annie Awards, British Academy Film Awards, and BMI Film & Television Awards. Overall, Elfman has won 33 awards from 74 nominations.

== Academy Awards ==
The Academy Awards are presented annually by the Academy of Motion Picture Arts and Sciences to recognize excellence of professionals in the film industry. Elfman has received four nominations.

Year	Nominated work	Award	Result	Ref.
1998	Good Will Hunting	Best Original Dramatic Score	Nominated	
1998	Men in Black	Best Original Musical or Comedy Score	Nominated	
2004	Big Fish	Best Original Score	Nominated	
2009	Milk	Best Original Score	Nominated	

== Annie Awards ==
The Annie Awards is an animation award show created and produced by the Los Angeles, California branch of the International Animated Film Association, ASIFA-Hollywood, since 1972. Originally designed to celebrate lifetime or career contributions to animation in the fields of producing, directing, animation, design, writing, voice acting, sound and sound effects, etc., in 1992 it began to honor animation as a whole, and created the category of Best Animated Feature. New categories were subsequently added for different animation media. Elfman has received one nomination.

Year	Nominated work	Award	Result	Ref.
2007	Danny Elfman, Rufus Wainwright, Rob Thomas: Meet the Robinsons	Music in an Animated Feature Production	Nominated	

== BMI Film & Television Awards ==
Established in 1986, the BMI Film & Television Awards "recognize the composers of the top grossing films and the highest-rated prime time television shows of the past year". Elfman has received 25 awards.

Year	Nominated work	Award	Result	Ref.
1987	Back to School	BMI Film Music Award	Won	
1989	Beetlejuice	BMI Film Music Award	Won	
1989	Scrooged	BMI Film Music Award	Won	
1990	Batman	BMI Film Music Award	Won	
1991	Dick Tracy	BMI Film Music Award	Won	
1993	Batman Returns	BMI Film Music Award	Won	
1996	The Simpsons	BMI TV Music Award	Nominated	
1997	Mission: Impossible	BMI Film Music Award	Won	
1998	Good Will Hunting	BMI Film Music Award	Won	
1998	Flubber	BMI Film Music Award	Won	
1998	Men in Black	BMI Film Music Award	Won	
1998	The Simpsons	BMI TV Music Award	Won	
2000	Sleepy Hollow	BMI Film Music Award	Won	
2001	The Family Man	BMI Film Music Award	Won	
2002	Danny Elfman	Outstanding Career Achievement Award	Won	
2002	Planet of the Apes	BMI Film Music Award	Won	
2003	Chicago	BMI Film Music Award	Won	
2003	Men in Black II	BMI Film Music Award	Won	
2003	Spider-Man	BMI Film Music Award	Won	
2003	The Simpsons	BMI TV Music Award	Won	
2004	Hulk	BMI Film Music Award	Won	
2005	Spider-Man 2	BMI Film Music Award	Won	
2005	Desperate Housewives	BMI TV Music Award	Won	
2006	Charlie and the Chocolate Factory	BMI Film Music Award	Won	
2006	Desperate Housewives	BMI TV Music Award	Won	
2006	Desperate Housewives	BMI TV Music Award	Won	
2007	Charlotte's Web	BMI Film Music Award	Won	
2007	Meet the Robinsons	BMI Film Music Award	Won	
2007	Nacho Libre	BMI Film Music Award	Won	
2007	Desperate Housewives	BMI TV Music Award	Won	
2008	Desperate Housewives	BMI TV Music Award	Won	
2009	Desperate Housewives	BMI TV Music Award	Won	
2010	Terminator Salvation	BMI TV Music Award	Won	
2010	The Wolfman	BMI TV Music Award	Won	
2010	Alice in Wonderland	BMI TV Music Award	Won	

== British Academy Film Awards ==
The British Academy Film Awards is an annual award show hosted by the British Academy of Film and Television Arts (BAFTA). First awarded in 1947, the awards are often cited as the British equivalent to the Academy Awards. Elfman has been nominated twice.

Year	Nominated work	Award	Result	Ref.
2002	Chicago	Best Film Music (Anthony Asquith Award)	Nominated	
2010	Alice in Wonderland	Best Film Music (Anthony Asquith Award)	Nominated	

== Broadcast Film Critics Association Awards ==
The Broadcast Film Critics Association Awards, commonly called the Critics' Choice Awards, are bestowed annually by the Broadcast Film Critics Association to honor the finest in cinematic achievement. Nominees are selected by written ballots in a week-long voting period, and are announced in December. Elfman has been nominated twice.

Year	Nominated work	Award	Result	Ref.
2003	Big Fish	Best Composer	Nominated	
2008	Milk	Best Composer	Nominated	

== Chicago Film Critics Association Awards ==
Elfman has been nominated four times.

Year	Nominated work	Award	Result	Ref.
1999	A Simple Plan	Best Original Score	Nominated	
2003	Big Fish	Best Original Score	Nominated	
2006	Charlie and the Chocolate Factory	Best Original Score	Nominated	
2008	Milk	Best Original Score	Nominated	

== Emmy Awards ==
Administered by three sister organizations who focus on various sectors of television and broadband programming (Academy of Television Arts & Sciences, National Academy of Television Arts and Sciences, and the International Academy of Television Arts and Sciences), the Emmy Awards "recognize excellence within various areas of television and emerging media". Elfman has received three awards from five nominations.

Year	Nominated work	Award	Result	Ref.
1990	"Main Title Theme" from The Simpsons	Outstanding Main Title Theme Music	Nominated	
2005	"Title Theme" from Desperate Housewives	Outstanding Main Title Theme Music	Won	
2016	Danny Elfman's Music from the Films of Tim Burton (Live from Lincoln Center) (PBS)	Outstanding Music Direction	Won	
2023	"Title Theme" from Wednesday	Outstanding Main Title Theme Music	Won	
2023	Wednesday: Woe is the Loneliest Number (shared with Chris Bacon)	Outstanding Music Composition for a Series (Original Dramatic Score)	Nominated	

== Golden Globes ==
The Golden Globe Awards are presented annually by the Hollywood Foreign Press Association (HFPA) to recognize outstanding achievements in the entertainment industry, both domestic and foreign, and to focus wide public attention upon the best in film and television. The formal ceremony and dinner at which the awards are presented is a major part of the film industry's awards season, which culminates each year with the Academy Awards. Elfman has been nominated three times.

Year	Nominated work	Award	Result	Ref.
1994	The Nightmare Before Christmas	Best Original Score	Nominated	
2004	Big Fish	Best Original Score	Nominated	
2011	Alice in Wonderland	Best Original Score	Nominated	

== Grammy Awards ==
The Grammy Awards are awarded annually by the National Academy of Recording Arts and Sciences of the United States for outstanding achievements in the record industry. Often considered the highest music honor, the awards were established in 1958. Elfman has received one award from twelve nominations.

Year	Nominated work	Award	Result	Ref.
1990	"The Batman Theme" from Batman	Best Instrumental Composition	Won	
1990	Batman	Best Album or Original Instrumental Background Score	Nominated	
1991	Dick Tracy	Best Instrumental Composition Written for a Motion Picture or for TV	Nominated	
1992	Edward Scissorhands	Best Instrumental Composition Written for a Motion Picture or for TV	Nominated	
1993	The Nightmare Before Christmas	Best Musical Album for Children	Nominated	
1997	Men in Black	Best Instrumental Composition Written for a Motion Picture or for TV	Nominated	
2001	Planet of the Apes	Best Score Soundtrack Album for a Motion Picture or TV	Nominated	
2002	Spider-Man	Best Score Soundtrack Album for a Motion Picture or TV	Nominated	
2003	Big Fish	Best Score Soundtrack Album for a Motion Picture or TV	Nominated	
2006	"Wonka's Welcome Song" from Charlie and the Chocolate Factory	Best Song Written for a Motion Picture or TV	Nominated	
2010	Milk	Best Score Soundtrack Album For Motion Picture, Television Or Other Visual Media	Nominated	
2011	Alice in Wonderland	Best Score Soundtrack Album For Motion Picture, Television Or Other Visual Media	Nominated	

== Phoenix Film Critics Society Awards ==
The Phoenix Film Critics Society (PFCS) is an organization of film reviewers from Phoenix-based publications. In December of each year, the PFCS meets to vote on their Phoenix Film Critics Society Awards (first given in 2000) for films released in the same calendar year.

Year	Nominated work	Award	Result	Ref.
2003	Big Fish	Best Original Score	Nominated	
2005	Charlie and the Chocolate Factory	Best Original Score	Won	
2012	Hitchcock	Best Original Score	Nominated	

== Satellite Awards ==
Originally known as the Golden Satellite Awards, the Satellite Awards are an annual award given by the International Press Academy to acknowledge the year's "outstanding artists, films, television shows, DVDs, and interactive media". Elfman has received one award from six nominations.

Year	Nominated work	Award	Result	Ref.
1996	Mars Attacks!	Best Original Score	Nominated	
1999	Sleepy Hollow	Best Original Score	Won	
2000	Proof of Life	Best Original Score	Nominated	
2004	Spider-Man 2	Best Original Score	Nominated	
2005	Corpse Bride	Best Original Score	Nominated	
2008	Milk	Best Original Score	Nominated	

== Saturn Awards ==
The Saturn Award is an award presented annually by the Academy of Science Fiction, Fantasy & Horror Films to honor the top works in science fiction, fantasy, and horror in film, television, and home video. First presented in 1972, the Saturn Awards are voted on by members of the presenting Academy. Elfman has received 7 awards from 16 nominations.

Year	Nominated work	Award	Result	Ref.
1989	Beetlejuice	Best Music	Nominated	
1991	Edward Scissorhands	Best Music	Nominated	
1993	The Nightmare Before Christmas	Best Music	Won	
1995	Dolores Claiborne	Best Music	Nominated	
1996	Mars Attacks!	Best Music	Won	
1996	The Frighteners	Best Music	Nominated	
1997	Men in Black	Best Music	Won	
1999	Sleepy Hollow	Best Music	Won	
2002	Spider-Man	Best Music	Won	
2003	Hulk	Best Music	Nominated	
2004	Spider-Man 2	Best Music	Nominated	
2005	Charlie and the Chocolate Factory	Best Music	Nominated	
2012	Frankenweenie	Best Music	Won	
2013	Oz the Great and Powerful	Best Music	Nominated	
2019	Dumbo	Best Music	Nominated	
2022	Doctor Strange in the Multiverse of Madness	Best Music	Won	

== Sierra Awards ==
The Las Vegas Film Critics Society (LVFCS) is a non-profit organization composed of selected print, television and film critics in the Las Vegas area. The LVFCS presents its Sierra Awards each year for the best in film. Elfman has received one award from two nominations.

Year	Nominated work	Award	Result	Ref.
1998	A Simple Plan	Best Score	Won	
2000	Sleepy Hollow	Best Score	Nominated	

== World Soundtrack Awards ==
The World Soundtrack Academy, launched in 2001 by the Flanders International Film Festival to organize and oversee the educational, cultural, and professional aspects of the art of film music, including the preservation of the history of the soundtrack and its worldwide promotion. The World Soundtrack Awards are "distributed annually to mark and celebrate outstanding achievements in scoring music for motion pictures, and to honor other achievements". Elfman has been nominated twice.

Year	Nominated work	Award	Result	Ref.
2002	Spider-Man	Best Original Soundtrack of the Year	Nominated	
2006	Charlie and the Chocolate Factory	Soundtrack Composer of the Year	Nominated	
2009	Milk, Taking Woodstock, Notorious	Soundtrack Composer of the Year	Nominated	
2010	Alice in Wonderland, The Wolfman	Soundtrack Composer of the Year	Nominated	
2013	Epic, Frankenweenie, Hitchcock, Oz the Great and Powerful, Promised Land, Silver Linings Playbook	Soundtrack Composer of the Year	Nominated	

== 20/20 Awards ==
Year	Nominated work	Award	Result	Ref.
2011	Edward Scissorhands	Best Original Score	Won	
2017	Mars Attacks!	Best Original Score	Won	

== Other recognitions ==
- 1976 - Elfman, as leader of the band The Mystic Knights of the Oingo Boingo won a trophy and $516.32 on "The Gong Show".
- 2000 – Elfman won Fantasporto's Special Career Award
- 2004 – Elfman was awarded the Frederick Loewe Award for Film Composing at the Palm Springs International Film Festival
- 2007 – Elfman received an honorary doctorate from the North Carolina School of the Arts; his commencement speech for the graduating class can be read here
- 2008 – Elfman won the Composer of the Year award at the Hollywood Film Festival
- 2015 – Elfman was inducted as a Disney Legend.
- 2017 – Elfman received the Max Steiner Film Music Achievement Award presented by Hollywood in Vienna.
- 2022 – Elfman received a Lifetime Achievement Award from the Society of Composers & Lyricists.
- 2025 – Elfman received Cheval Noir Lifetime Achievement Award at the 29th Fantasia International Film Festival.
