= Beetlejuice (franchise) =

Warner Bros. media franchise

- Official franchise logo
- Created by: Michael McDowell; Larry Wilson
- Owners: Warner Bros. Entertainment (Skydance)
- Years: 1988–present

Films and television
- Films: Beetlejuice (1988); Beetlejuice Beetlejuice (2024)
- Animated series: Beetlejuice (1989–1991)

Theatrical presentations
- Musical: Beetlejuice (2018–present)

Games
- Video games: List of video games

Audio
- Soundtracks: Beetlejuice (Original Motion Picture Soundtrack) (1988); Beetlejuice (Original Broadway Cast Recording) (2019); Beetlejuice Beetlejuice (Original Motion Picture Soundtrack) (2024); Beetlejuice live at the Regent theatre Melbourne (2026)

Miscellaneous
- Theme park attractions: Universal Monsters Live Rock and Roll Show; Warner Bros. Classics & Great Gremlins Adventure

Beetlejuice is an American dark fantasy comedy horror media franchise that originated with the film Beetlejuice (1988). The franchise centers around the afterlife and the sleazy Betelgeuse (named after the star of the same name), who can either be summoned from or banished back to the Netherworld by saying his name three times. Betelgeuse's precise nature differs according to the medium he appears in. He has been depicted as a malicious being with motivations ranging from a love of chaos to a desire for human companionship. Each entry in the series involves Betelgeuse's interactions with Lydia Deetz, a goth fascinated with the "strange and unusual". Across the various entries in the franchise, the duo have been presented as enemies, best friends and uneasy allies.

The original film was met with critical and commercial success and numerous accolades. The franchise expanded with the release of a 1989–1991 animated television series, a 2018 stage musical, several video games and an eventual sequel, Beetlejuice Beetlejuice (2024), with a third film currently in development.

The character of Beetlejuice has also appeared in the Universal Parks & Resorts live show Universal Monsters Live Rock and Roll Show alongside Universal Monsters characters, as well as the Australian version of the dark ride Warner Bros. Classics & Great Gremlins Adventure at Warner Bros. Movie World.

== Films ==
Film	U.S. release date	Director	Screenwriters	Story by	Producers
Beetlejuice	March 30, 1988	Tim Burton	Warren Skaaren & Michael McDowell	Larry Wilson & Michael McDowell	Larry Wilson, Michael Bender & Richard Hashimoto
Beetlejuice Beetlejuice	September 6, 2024	Tim Burton	Miles Millar & Alfred Gough	Miles Millar, Alfred Gough & Seth Grahame-Smith	Tim Burton, Dede Gardner, Tommy Harper, Marc Toberoff & Jeremy Kleiner

=== Beetlejuice (1988) ===
Beetlejuice is directed by Tim Burton, and written by Michael McDowell, Warren Skaaren and Larry Wilson. Starring Alec Baldwin, Geena Davis, Jeffrey Jones, Catherine O'Hara, Winona Ryder, and Michael Keaton as the titular character, produced by The Geffen Film Company, and distributed by Warner Bros.

Happily married couple Adam and Barbara Maitland die in a car accident, whereupon they learn that the afterlife is a complex and overworked bureaucracy in the Netherworld and that they are required to haunt their rural Connecticut home for the next one hundred twenty-five years before they can move on. Unfortunately, it is purchased by New York real estate developer Charles Deetz, who wants to use it as a retreat from his workaholic city life. Accompanying Charles are his new wife, Delia, a modern artist; and Lydia, Charles' teenage daughter from his first marriage. Charles and Delia's presence upsets the Maitlands, although the childless couple bond with Lydia, a goth whose interest in the "strange and unusual" allows her to see them.

The Maitlands make contact with Betelgeuse, an older and more powerful ghost who formerly worked for the Netherworld's bureaucracy before his loathsome nature alienated him from his superiors. Betelgeuse offers to work for the couple as a "bio-exorcist" and frighten the Deetzes away. The Maitlands initially agree, but are put off by Betelgeuse's crude demeanor and violent tactics. Upon meeting Lydia himself, Betelgeuse becomes smitten with her and attempts to lure her to the afterlife. Meanwhile, interior designer Otho Fenlock discovers a handbook assigned to the Maitlands to help them cope with being ghosts and uses it to hold a séance.

The inexperienced Otho inadvertently begins an exorcism that threatens the Maitlands' afterlives. Betelgeuse tells a desperate Lydia that he can save the couple if she agrees to marry him, an act that would allow him to stay in the realm of the living permanently. A reluctant Lydia agrees and Betelgeuse saves the Maitlands. Betelgeuse initiates a wedding ceremony with Lydia, but the Maitlands successfully defeat him. The group come to a rapport and all live together happily in the house, sharing parenting duties for Lydia.

=== Beetlejuice Beetlejuice (2024) ===
Beetlejuice Beetlejuice is directed by Tim Burton from a screenplay by the writing team of Alfred Gough and Miles Millar, based on a story by Gough, Millar and Seth Grahame-Smith. Starring Michael Keaton, Winona Ryder, Catherine O'Hara, Jenna Ortega, Monica Bellucci and Willem Dafoe, the film was released by Warner Bros. Pictures on September 6, 2024.

Thirty-six years after the first installment's events, Lydia has become the host of a paranormal television show and the Maitlands' ghosts have successfully left their house due to a loophole in the afterlife bureaucracy. After Charles dies in a shark attack, Lydia and her teenage daughter, Astrid, return to Winter River for his funeral. Lydia, still haunted by memories of Betelgeuse, confesses her past to her producer/fiancé Rory, who disbelieves her. Attempting to prove Lydia wrong, he summons Betelgeuse, who has since returned to the afterlife bureaucracy and used his new position to expand his bio-exorcism business. Still obsessed with Lydia, Betelgeuse makes romantic overtures to her, but she refuses.

In the Netherworld, Betelgeuse's ex-wife Delores LaFerve, an occultist who tried to steal his soul, resurfaces and goes in search of him. Meanwhile, Astrid meets and falls in love with Jeremy, a teenage ghost who claims to have died accidentally falling out of his tree house. Jeremy lures Astrid into the afterlife, claiming to be able to reunite her with her late father, Richard, who died while in the Amazon.

Lydia learns that Jeremy murdered his parents and died in a confrontation with the police. She realizes Jeremy intends to trap Astrid in the Netherworld so he can take her place. Lydia summons Betelgeuse, who agrees to save Astrid in exchange for Lydia marrying him. Lydia accepts and the duo travel to the Netherworld together. Betelgeuse intercepts Jeremy as he attempts to swap places with Astrid and sends him to the "Fires of Damnation". Lydia and Astrid briefly reunite with Richard before escaping.

Betelgeuse appears at Lydia's wedding, where he induces Rory to confess he is only marrying Lydia for profit. Delores appears, but she is disposed of along with Rory. Betelgeuse tries to marry Lydia in Rory's place, but Astrid points out a clause in the Handbook for the Recently Deceased that invalidates agreements made by ghosts who bring the living into the Netherworld and as her mother banishes Betelgeuse back there.

=== Future ===
In an August 2024 interview with Variety, Tim Burton, when asked about the possibility of a potential third film, stated, "Let's do the math ... it took 35 years to do this, so I'll be over 100. But I guess it's possible with the advent of science these days, but I don't think so". On April 11, 2025, the third film was officially confirmed to be in the works. However, in July 2025, Burton cast doubt on a third film in an interview with The Hollywood Reporter, stating that no one contacted him about it. In the same interview, Jenna Ortega stated that she would be open to reprising her role as Astrid if Burton was involved in directing. In November 2026, writers Alfred Gough and Miles Millar suggested that a third film was unlikely, following Catherine O'Hara's death in January 2026.

== Television ==
=== Beetlejuice (1989–1991) ===
Due to the film's financial success, a Beetlejuice Saturday-morning animated television series was created for ABC and marketed to children and tweens. The series ran for four seasons (the final season airing on Fox), from September 9, 1989, to December 6, 1991. Burton served as the show's developer and executive producer. As opposed to every other franchise entry, here the character's name is both spelled and pronounced as "Beetlejuice".

Because of the demographic shift away from the adult-oriented film, the series re-imagines Lydia as a tween instead of a teenager and Beetlejuice as a friendly prankster whom she summons through her bedroom mirror. Rather than inhabit the afterlife, this iteration of Beetlejuice lives in the "Neitherworld", a fantasy land inhabited by monsters akin to Burton's Halloween Town. Although he refers to himself as "the Ghost with the Most", this Beetlejuice is never depicted as having been a living human, but is rather a creature born in the Neitherworld and whose parents – a similar pair of beings – feature in a few episodes. Beetlejuice additionally has a younger, more popular and polite brother named Donny who admires his elder sibling while eschewing all of his negative traits.

The series heavily relies on pun-based humor and visual gags based on Beetlejuice's ability to transform himself into a variety of monsters, people, and objects. Lydia and Beetlejuice's close-knit friendship is a recurring theme of the series, and the pair frequently find themselves in situations where they must rescue each other from danger. A recurring plot of the series is Lydia summoning Beetlejuice to the real world to help her with some difficulty, especially her ongoing school rivalry with queen bee Claire Brewster. Although he always has Lydia's best interests at heart, Beetlejuice's own selfish and chaotic nature often results in some disaster before he sets things right.

=== The Rosey and Buddy Show ===
Beetlejuice made a cameo appearance in the 1992 animated TV special The Rosey and Buddy Show, produced, like the Beetlejuice animated series, by Nelvana. Like in the Beetlejuice animated series, Beetlejuice is voiced by Stephen Ouimette.

=== "Ghost with the Most" (2020) ===
On October 6, 2020, Beetlejuice guest-starred in the Teen Titans Go! episode "Ghost with the Most", which aired as part of the show's sixth season. In this appearance, he was voiced by Alex Brightman, reprising his role from the Beetlejuice Broadway musical.

== Video games ==
- Adventures of Beetlejuice: Skeletons in the Closet is a video game released for MS-DOS in 1990. It is based on the animated series.
- Beetlejuice is a video game developed by Rare and released for the Nintendo Entertainment System in 1991.
- Beetlejuice: Horrific Hijinx from the Neitherworld! is a video game created by Rare and published by LJN for the Nintendo Game Boy. It is based on the animated series.
- A Beetlejuice-themed fun pack for the toys-to-life video game Lego Dimensions was released in September 2017. The pack includes a Betelgeuse minifigure and constructable Saturn's Sandworm, and adds a Beetlejuice-themed open-world area and battle arena to the game. In the Beetlejuice-themed open-world area, Betelgeuse is voiced by Christopher Swindle, Adam Maitland is voiced by Jeff Shine, Barbara Maitland and Delia Dietz are voiced by Krizia Bajos, and Harry the Head-Shrunken Hunter is voiced by Tom Kane. Betelgeuse also features prominently in an episode of Teen Titans Go! included as part of the game. In the Teen Titans Go! episode, when the Titans travel to the Lego world, Raven summons Betelgeuse by saying his name three times and gets to go to the Beetlejuice world. Betelgeuse says if Raven wants to win the Lego building competition, she should resort to cheating and use magic, but tricks her into making a giant gargoyle that the Titans have to fight.
- Beetlejuice is represented in the platform fighter MultiVersus as part of its second season, with Christopher Swindle reprising his role.

== Comics ==
Several comic book series based on the animated television series were published by Harvey Comics in 1991 and 1992. The series were the one-shots Beetlejuice (October 1991), Beetlejuice in the Neitherworld (November 1991), and Beetlejuice Holiday Special (February 1992), and the three-issue Beetlejuice (September—November 1992).

== Novels ==
A series of juvenile novels based on the animated television series were published by Aladdin Paperbacks in 1992. The novels were Beetlejuice for President, Lydia's Scream Date, Rock 'n' Roll Nightmare, Twisted Tours, Camp Fright, and Trial by Ghost.

== Stage musical ==
In 2016, work began on a Broadway stage musical adaptation of the film directed by Alex Timbers, produced by Warner Bros., with music and lyrics by Eddie Perfect and book by Scott Brown and Anthony King. The musical was debuted by readings starring Christopher Fitzgerald, Kris Kukul (musical director), and Connor Gallagher (choreographer). It premiered at the National Theatre in Washington, D.C. for a limited run from October 14 to November 18, 2018, with Alex Brightman in the title role.

The production was scheduled to play its final performance at the Winter Garden on June 6, 2020. The producers were unable to find another theater to house the show due to the COVID Broadway shutdown in March 2020. The show reopened at the Marquis Theatre on April 8, 2022, and closed on January 8, 2023, at a financial loss, having been unable to recoup its $21 million investment. Subsequent productions opened across the world, including a North American national tour.

== Main cast and characters ==
List indicators

This section includes characters who will appear or have appeared in more than two films in the series.

- An empty grey cell indicates the character was not in the film, or that the character's official presence has not yet been confirmed.
- ^{A} indicates an appearance through archival footage or audio.
- ^{C} indicates a cameo role.
- ^{P} indicates an appearance in onscreen photographs.
- ^{V} indicates a voice-only role.
- ^{Y} indicates a younger version of the character.

Character	Films		Television series	Stage musical (original cast)
Character	Beetlejuice	Beetlejuice Beetlejuice	Beetlejuice	Stage musical (original cast)
Character	1988	2024	1989–1991	2018–2023
Betelgeuse Beetlejuice	Michael Keaton	Michael Keaton	Stephen Ouimette	Alex Brightman
Lydia Deetz	Winona Ryder	Winona Ryder	Alyson Court	Sophia Anne Caruso
Delia Deetz	Catherine O'Hara	Catherine O'Hara	Elizabeth Hanna	Leslie Kritzer
Charles Deetz	Jeffrey Jones	Mark Heenehan Charlie Hopkinson^{V} Jeffrey Jones^{P}	Roger Dunn	Adam Dannheisser
Adam Maitland	Alec Baldwin	Mentioned		Rob McClure
Barbara Maitland	Geena Davis	Mentioned		Kerry Butler
Juno	Sylvia Sidney			Jill Abramovitz
Miss Argentina	Patrice Martinez			Leslie Kritzer
Maxie Dean	Robert Goulet	Mentioned		Danny Rutigliano
Otho Fenlock	Glenn Shadix			Kelvin Moon
Sarah Dean	Maree Cheatham			
Jane Butterfield Jr.	Rachel Mittelman^{Y}	Amy Nuttall		
Astrid Deetz		Jenna Ortega		
Rory		Justin Theroux		
Delores LaFerve		Monica Bellucci		
Wolf Jackson		Willem Dafoe		
Father Damien		Burn Gorman		
Bob		Nick Kellington		
Jeremy Frazier		Arthur Conti		
Richard		Santiago Cabrera		
The Janitor		Danny DeVito^{C}		
Vlad		Filipe Cates^{C}		

== Additional crew and production details ==
Title	Crew/detail					
Title	Composer	Cinematographer	Editors	Production companies	Distributing company	Running time
Beetlejuice	Danny Elfman	Thomas E. Ackerman	Jane Kurson	The Geffen Film Company	Warner Bros. Pictures	1 hr 32 mins
Beetlejuice Beetlejuice	Danny Elfman	Haris Zambarloukos	Jay Prychidny	Plan B Entertainment; Tim Burton Productions	Warner Bros. Pictures	1 hr 45 mins

== Release and reception ==
=== Critical response ===
Film	Rotten Tomatoes	Metacritic	CinemaScore
Beetlejuice	83% (117 reviews)	71/100 (19 reviews)	B
Beetlejuice Beetlejuice	76% (364 reviews)	62/100 (61 reviews)	B+

=== Box office performance ===
Film	Box office gross			Budget	Ref.
Film	North America	Other territories	Worldwide	Budget	Ref.
Beetlejuice	$74,493,906	$618,753	$75,112,659	$15 million	
Beetlejuice Beetlejuice	$294,100,435	$157,000,000	$451,100,435	$100 million	
Totals	$368,594,341	$157,618,753	$526,213,094	$115 million	
