= 16th Saturn Awards =

US film and television award ceremony

- Date: January 21, 1990
- Site: California, U.S.

Highlights
- Most awards: Who Framed Roger Rabbit, Beetlejuice and Big (3)
- Most nominations: Who Framed Roger Rabbit and Beetlejuice (8)

The 16th Saturn Awards, honoring the best in science fiction, fantasy and horror film and television in 1988, were held on January 21, 1990.

== Winners and nominees ==
Below is a complete list of nominees and winners. Winners are highlighted in bold.

=== Film ===
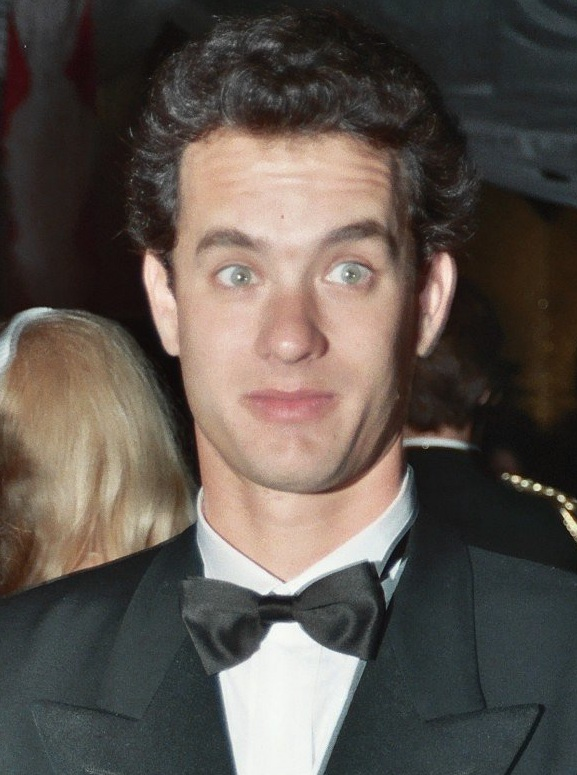
Tom Hanks, Best Actor winner.

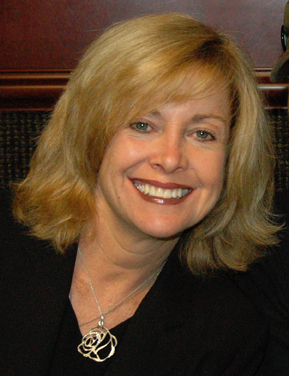
Catherine Hicks, Best Actress winner.

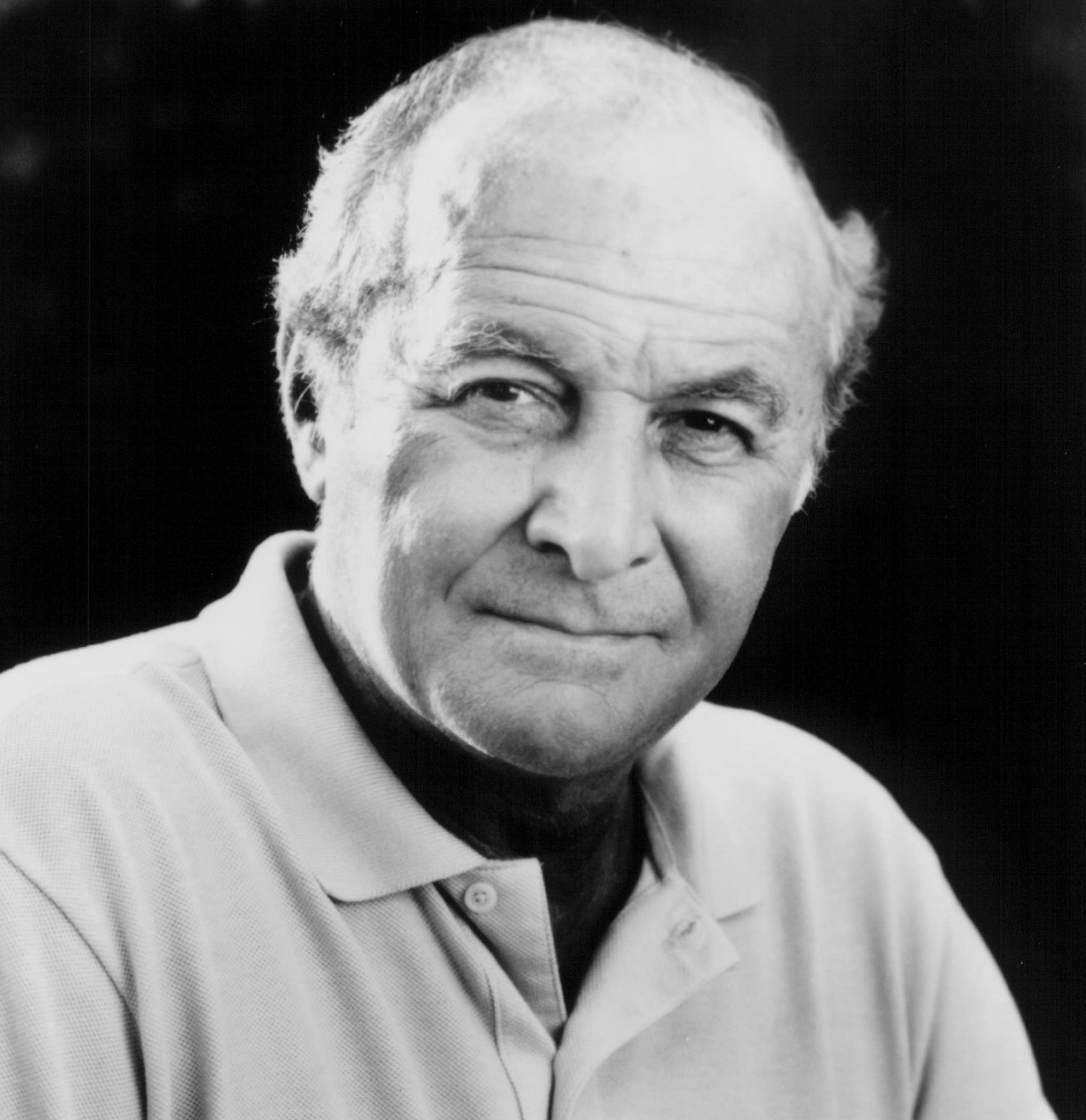
Robert Loggia, Best Supporting Actor winner.

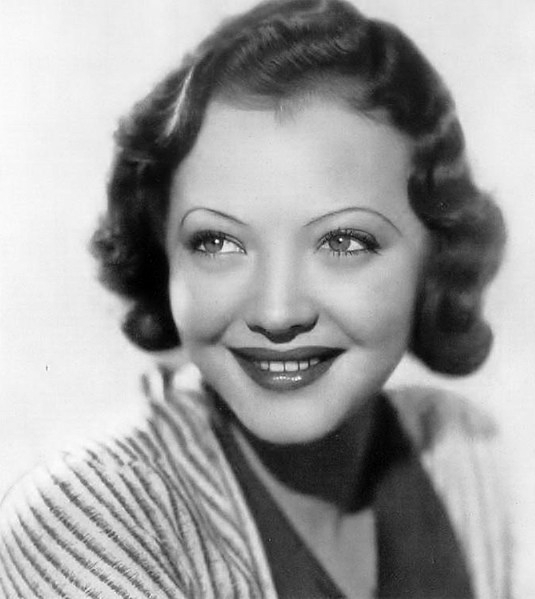
Sylvia Sidney, Best Supporting Actress winner.

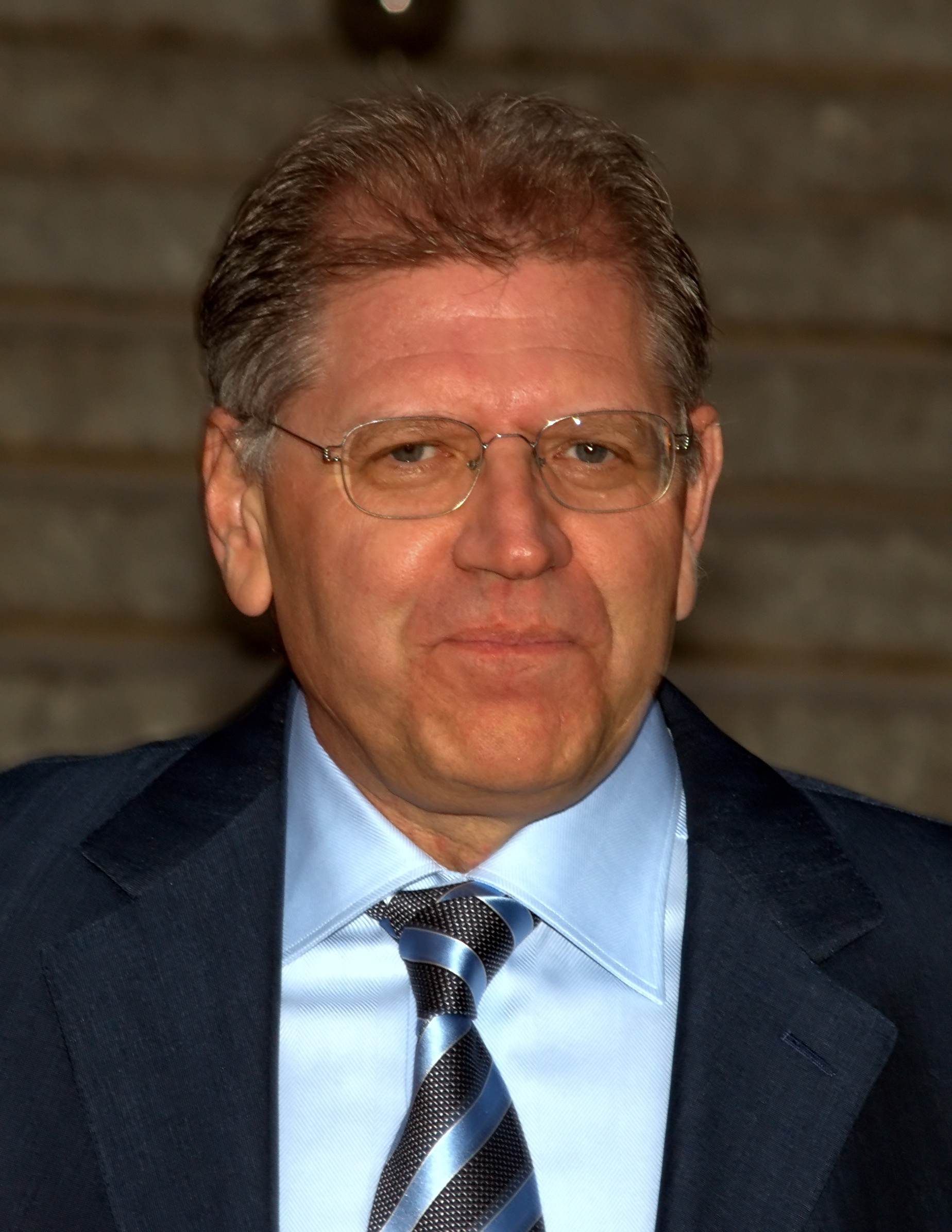
Robert Zemeckis, Best Director winner.

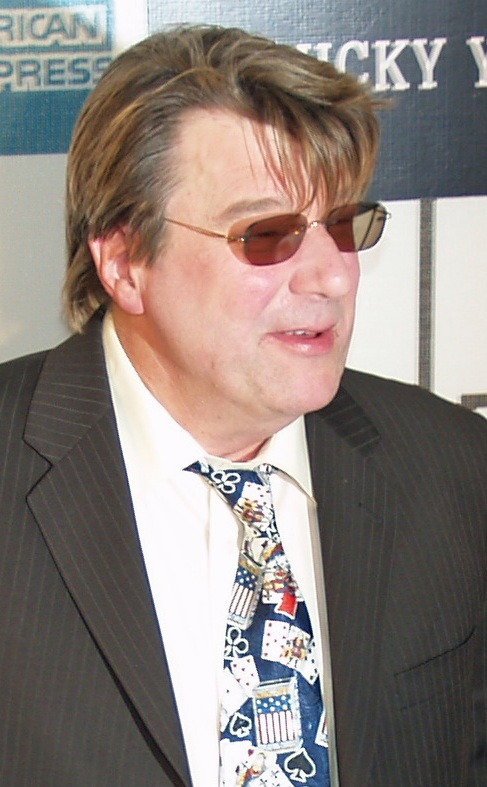
Christopher Young, Best Music winner.

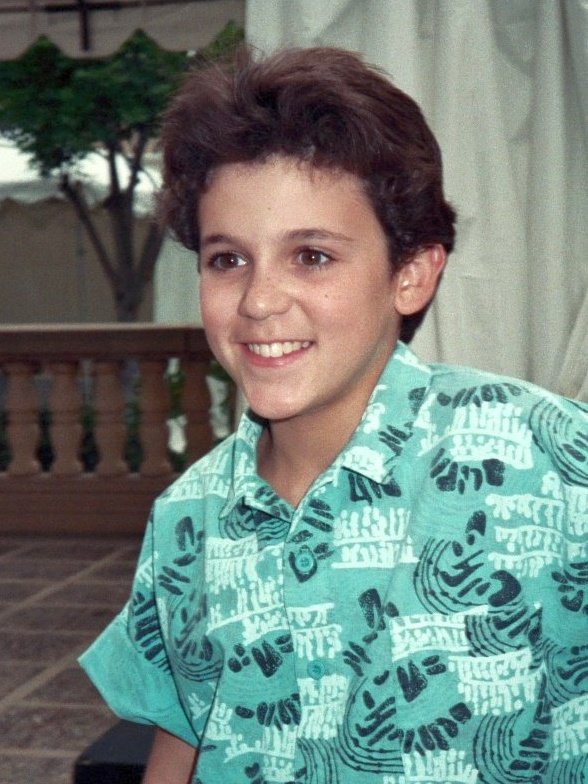
Fred Savage, Best Performance by a Younger Actor winner.

Best Science Fiction Film	Best Fantasy Film
**Alien Nation**; The Blob; Cocoon: The Return; My Stepmother Is an Alien; Short Circuit 2; They Live	**Who Framed Roger Rabbit**; Big; The Land Before Time; Scrooged; Willow; Without a Clue
Best Horror Film	Best Performance by a Younger Actor
**Beetlejuice**; Child's Play; Dead Ringers; Halloween 4: The Return of Michael Myers; Hellbound: Hellraiser II; A Nightmare on Elm Street 4: The Dream Master; Waxwork	**Fred Savage – Vice Versa** as Charlie Seymour; Warwick Davis – Willow as Willow Ufgood; Rodney Eastman – Deadly Weapon as Zeke; Lukas Haas – Lady in White as Frankie Scarlatti; Corey Haim – Watchers as Travis Cornell; Jared Rushton – Big as Billy; Alex Vincent – Child's Play as Andy Barclay
Best Actor	Best Actress
**Tom Hanks – Big** as Josh Baskin; Hume Cronyn – Cocoon: The Return as Joe Finley; Bob Hoskins – Who Framed Roger Rabbit as Eddie Valiant; Jeremy Irons – Dead Ringers as Beverly Mantle / Elliot Mantle; Bill Murray – Scrooged as Frank Cross; James Spader – Jack's Back as John / Rick Wesford	**Catherine Hicks – Child's Play** as Karen Barclay; Kim Basinger – My Stepmother Is an Alien as Celeste Martin; Amanda Donohoe – The Lair of the White Worm as Lady Sylvia Marsh; Cassandra Peterson – Elvira: Mistress of the Dark as Elvira; Joanna Pacuła – The Kiss as Felice Dunbar; Jessica Tandy – Cocoon: The Return as Alma Finley
Best Supporting Actor	Best Supporting Actress
**Robert Loggia – Big** as MacMillan; Robert Englund – A Nightmare on Elm Street 4: The Dream Master as Freddy Krueger; Jack Gilford – Cocoon: The Return as Bernie Lefkowitz; Michael Keaton – Beetlejuice as Betelgeuse; Christopher Lloyd – Who Framed Roger Rabbit as Judge Doom; Mandy Patinkin – Alien Nation as Det. Samuel 'George' Francisco	**Sylvia Sidney – Beetlejuice** as Juno; Joanna Cassidy – Who Framed Roger Rabbit as Dolores; Katherine Helmond – Lady in White as Amanda Harper; Clare Higgins – Hellbound: Hellraiser II as Julia Cotton; Jean Marsh – Willow as Queen Bavmorda; Zelda Rubinstein – Poltergeist III as Tangina Barrons; Meredith Salenger – The Kiss as Amy
Best Director	Best Writing
**Robert Zemeckis – Who Framed Roger Rabbit**; Tim Burton – Beetlejuice; Renny Harlin – A Nightmare on Elm Street 4: The Dream Master; Anthony Hickox – Waxwork; Penny Marshall – Big; Charles Matthau – Doin' Time on Planet Earth	**Gary Ross** and **Anne Spielberg – Big**; Michael McDowell and Warren Skaaren – Beetlejuice; Tom Holland, John Lafia and Don Mancini – Child's Play; David Cronenberg and Norman Snider – Dead Ringers; Alan B. McElroy – Halloween 4: The Return of Michael Myers; Jeffrey Price and Peter S. Seaman – Who Framed Roger Rabbit
Best Music	Best Costume
**Christopher Young – Hellbound: Hellraiser II**; Danny Elfman – Beetlejuice; Michael Hoenig – The Blob; Howard Shore – Dead Ringers; John Massari – Killer Klowns from Outer Space; John Carpenter and Alan Howarth – They Live; Alan Silvestri – Who Framed Roger Rabbit	**Barbara Lane – Willow**; Denise Cronenberg – Dead Ringers; Darcie F. Olson – Killer Klowns from Outer Space; Michael Jeffery – The Lair of the White Worm; Stephen M. Chudej – Nightfall; Leonard Pollack – Waxwork
Best Make-up	Best Special Effects
**Ve Neill, Steve La Porte** and **Robert Short – Beetlejuice**; John M. Elliott, Jr. and Stan Winston – Alien Nation; R. Christopher Biggs and Sheri Short – Critters 2: The Main Course; Mark Shostrom – Phantasm II; David LeRoy Anderson and Lance Anderson – The Serpent and the Rainbow; Bob Keen – Waxwork	**George Gibbs, Ken Ralston, Richard Williams (Industrial Light & Magic) – Who Framed Roger Rabbit**; Peter Kuran, Alan Munro, Ted Rae and Robert Short – Beetlejuice; Kevin Pike, Hoyt Yeatman and Will Vinton – Moonwalker; Eric Brevig, Allen Hall (Dream Quest Images) – Scrooged; Eric Allard and Jeff Jarvis – Short Circuit 2; John Richardson (Industrial Light & Magic) – Willow

=== Television ===
Best Genre Television Series
- **Star Trek: The Next Generation**
  - Beauty and the Beast
  - Freddy's Nightmares
  - Friday the 13th: The Series
  - Out of This World
  - Superboy
  - War of the Worlds

=== Special awards ===
==== Life Career Award ====
- Ray Walston

==== President's Award ====
- Carrie Fisher
