= Betelgeuse (disambiguation) =

Betelgeuse is a red supergiant star in the constellation Orion.

Betelgeuse may also refer to:

== Fiction ==
- Betelgeuse (comics), sequel to Franco-Belgian science-fiction comic series Aldebaran
- Les bannis de Bételgeuse, 1998 young adult novel by Jean-Louis Trudel
- Betelgeuse, a main character played by Michael Keaton in the 1988 American comedy horror fantasy film Beetlejuice
- Betelgeuse Romanee-Conti, a character in the Japanese light novel series Re:Zero − Starting Life in Another World

== Ships ==
- Betelgeuse, oil tanker destroyed in the 1979 Whiddy Island Disaster, Ireland
- USS Betelgeuse, a U.S.Navy shipname and list of ships by that name
  - USS Betelgeuse (AK-260), the last of the cargo ships in service in the United States Navy

== Other ==
- Bételgeuse, a French nuclear weapons test

== See also ==
- Beetlejuice (disambiguation)
- Beatlejuice, a Beatles cover band
