= Van Helsing's Factory =

Roller coaster at Movie Park Germany

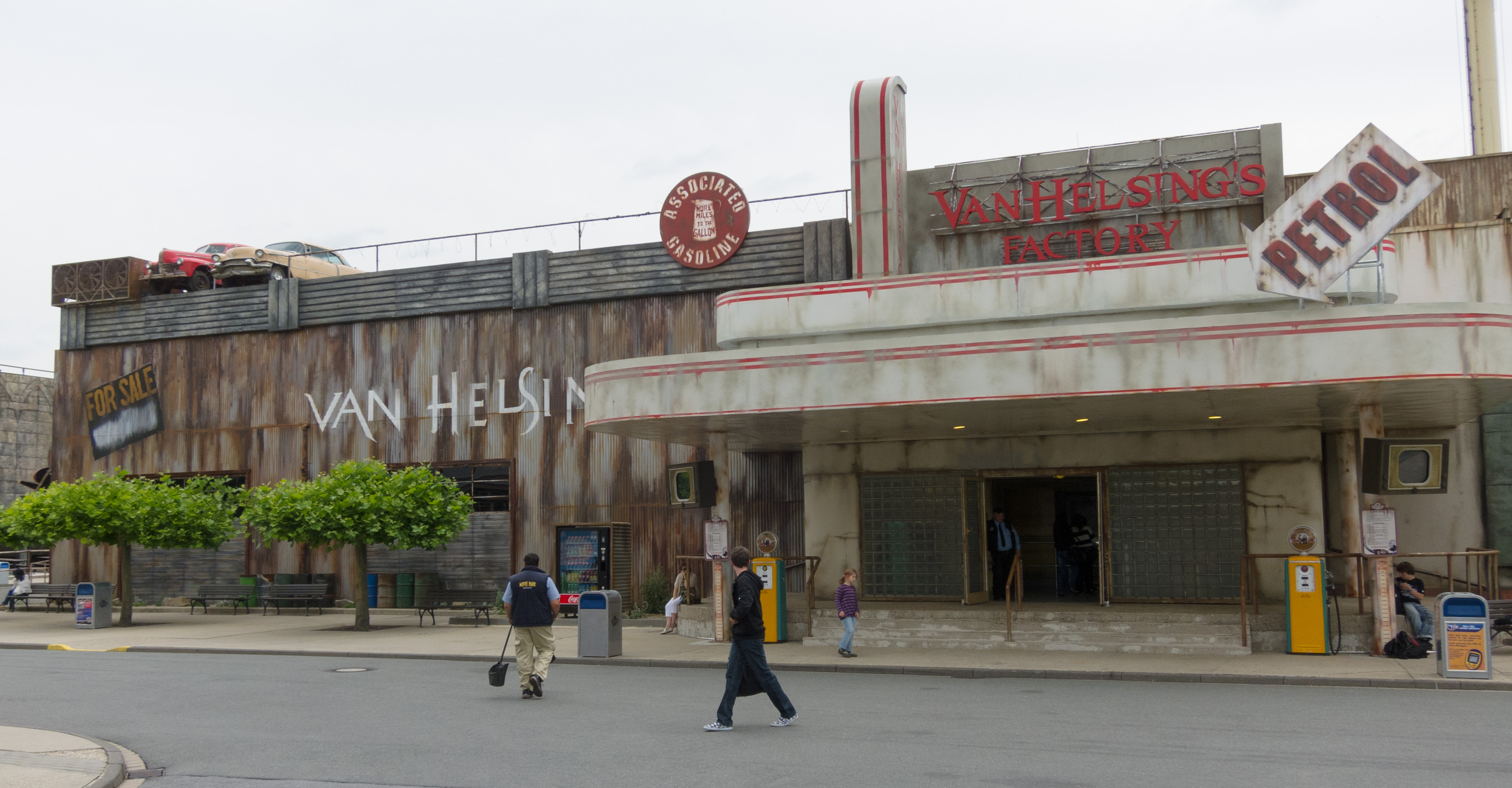
- The exterior of Van Helsing's Factory is themed as an abandoned 1950s American garage.

Movie Park Germany
- Location: Movie Park Germany
- Park section: Streets of New York
- Coordinates: 51.622099°N 6.975234°E
- Status: Operating
- Opening date: 18 June 2011
- Cost: €5 million
- Replaced: Gremlin Invasion

General statistics
- Type: Steel – Enclosed
- Manufacturer: Gerstlauer
- Model: Bobsled Coaster
- Lift/launch system: 1 chain lift hill and 1 drive tire lift hill
- Height: 8 m (26 ft)
- Length: 400 m (1,300 ft)
- Speed: 36 km/h (22 mph)
- Site Area: 3,000 m^{2} (32,000 sq ft)
- Inversions: 0
- Duration: 1:50
- Capacity: 848 riders per hour
- G-force: 4
- Height restriction: 120 cm (3 ft 11 in)
- Trains: 9 cars. Riders are arranged 2 across in 2 rows for a total of 36 riders per train.
- Theme: Vampire hunting
- Van Helsing's Factory at RCDB

Van Helsing's Factory is a steel enclosed roller coaster at the Movie Park Germany amusement park in Bottrop, Germany. The Gerstlauer dark ride opened in June 2011 as a replacement for the defunct Gremlin Invasion ride.

== History ==
On 30 June 1996, Warner Bros. Movie World Germany opened with a dark ride named Gremlin Invasion, modelled after the Australian Warner Bros. Movie World's Warner Bros. Classics & Great Gremlins Adventure. On 3 April 2004, Warner Bros. Movie World Germany was acquired by StarParks. This acquisition resulted in various Warner Bros.-licensed properties being removed from the park including DC Comics, Gremlins and Looney Tunes. The following year, Movie Park Germany opened with Gremlin Invasion remaining closed.

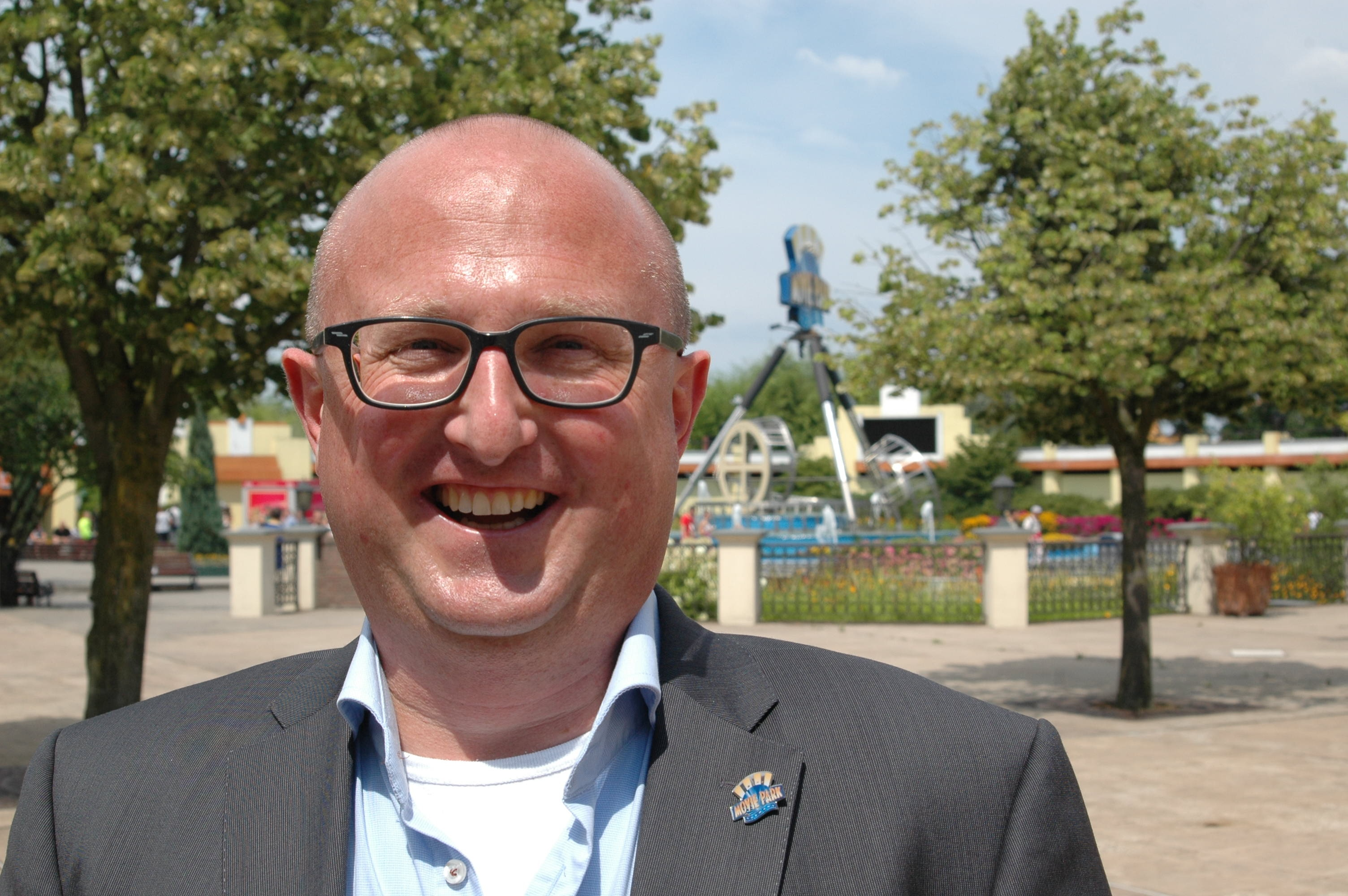
Wouter Dekkers (2014)

On 17 May 2010, the park was acquired by Parques Reunidos. The former Gremlins show building and surrounding area was recognised by the park and its new owners as a negative part of Movie Park Germany. Due to the popularity of the park's Halloween events, Wouter Dekkers, Movie Park Germany's general manager, pitched the idea of a roller coaster with a horror theme to the new owners just one month after the acquisition. Parques Reunidos ultimately approved the ride, investing €5 million to design and build the ride. Within the month, a contract with German-based roller coaster firm Gerstlauer was signed. Movie Park Germany also worked with P&P Projects, Threshold Animation Studios and TAA Industries to develop the ride's storyline and theming. After just under a year construction Van Helsing's Factory officially opened to the public on 18 June 2011.

== Characteristics ==
Van Helsing's Factory is a Gerstlauer Bobsled Coaster, characterised by single cars and sharp turns similar to that of a Wild Mouse. Each of the ride's nine cars seats four people in two rows.

The ride has a total length of 400 metres (1,300 ft). Riders reach heights of up to 8 metres (26 ft) and speeds of up to 36 kilometres per hour (22 mph). The roller coaster is enclosed in a 3,000-square-metre (32,000 sq ft) building. The track itself is situated on a base frame with two anchor points as opposed to a conventional roller coaster with foundations. This frame measures 51 by 54 metres (167 by 177 ft). The track is filled with sand, allowing for a comparatively quiet ride.

Van Helsing's Factory is themed after the fictional Abraham Van Helsing, originally from Bram Stoker's 1897 novel Dracula. Movie Park Germany chose this theme due to the lack of intellectual property restrictions on the work. The outside of the building is themed to a 1950s American garage. The inside of the show building is themed to the factory where Van Helsing prepares his cars for vampire hunting.

== Ride experience ==
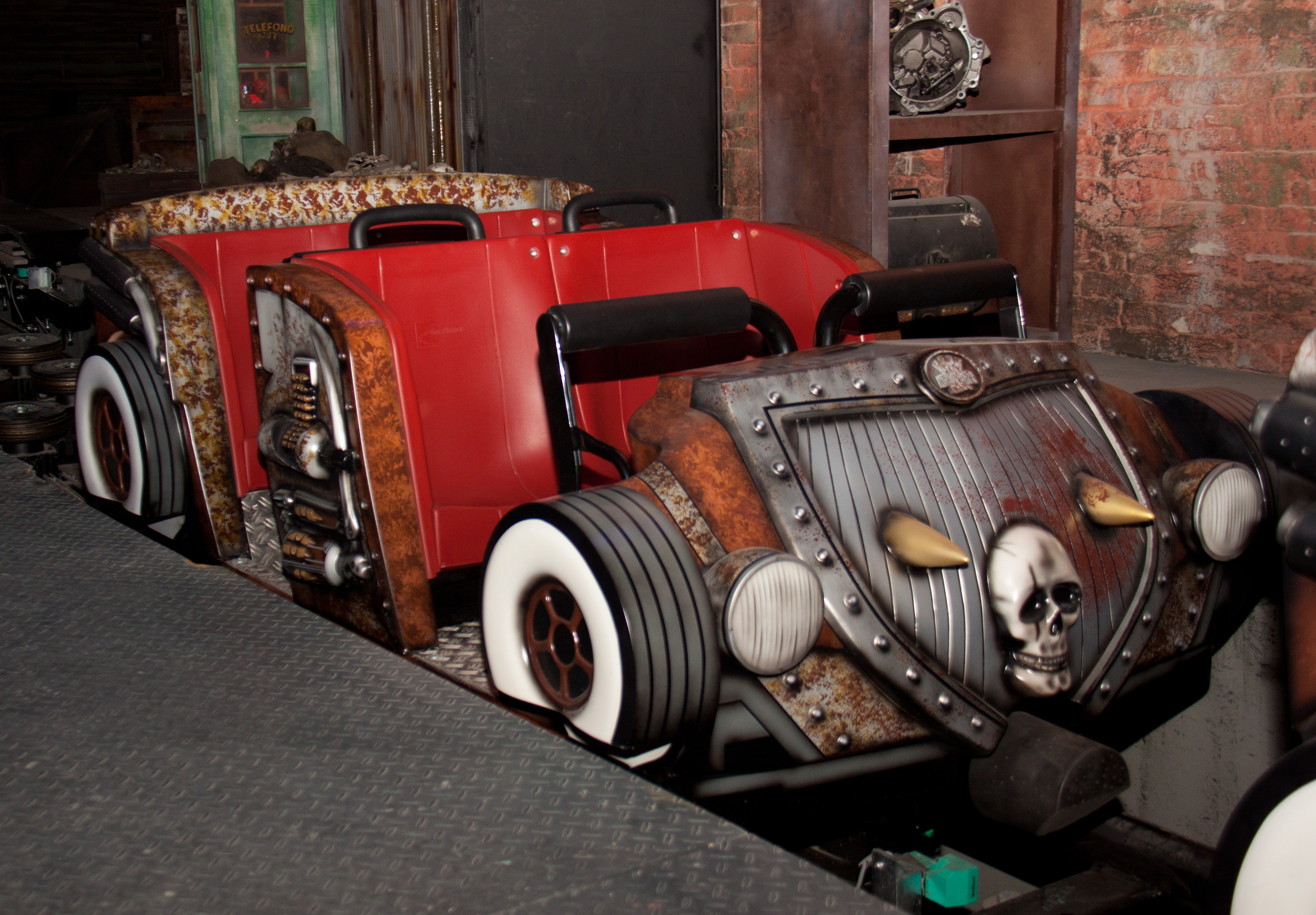
One of the highly themed cars used on Van Helsing's Factory at the station

Riders enter Van Helsing's Factory from the Streets of New York section of Movie Park Germany. The outside of the building is themed to a 1950s American garage with the storyline taking place in the 1960s. The queue line and pre-shows inform guests that they are touring the Van Helsing's Factory. Once riders reach the station, they are recruited on a vampire hunt and must board one of Van Helsing's cars.

After being dispatched, the ride slowly moves around a series of turns before ascending the 8-metre (26 ft) chain lift hill. The ride drops down a spiraling turn to the right before crossing under the first lift hill. It then goes through a banked turnaround before navigating through several Wild Mouse-style unbanked turns. A second lift hill follows, however, this hill is propelled by drive tires, allowing for the cars to accelerate while climbing the hill. A number of left hand turns follow this lift hill before the cars enter the final brake run. The cars then return to the station where riders are informed that their mission is complete.

== See also ==
- Scooby-Doo Spooky Coaster, Warner Bros. Movie World Australia's replacement for their Gremlins ride
