= Warner Bros. Classics & Great Gremlins Adventure =

Dark ride at Warner Bros. Movie World

Warner Bros. Classics & The Great Gremlin Adventure

Warner Bros. Movie World
- Area: Main Street
- Coordinates: 27.907782°S 153.311059°E
- Status: Closed
- Opening date: 3 June 1991
- Closing date: 9 September 2001
- Replaced by: Scooby-Doo Spooky Coaster

Warner Bros. Movie World Germany
- Area: Marienhof
- Coordinates: 51.62209°N 6.975468°E
- Status: Closed
- Soft opening date: 29 June 1996
- Opening date: 30 June 1996
- Closing date: Mid-September 2004
- Replaced by: Van Helsing's Factory

Ride statistics
- Attraction type: Dark ride
- Manufacturer: Warner Bros. Movie World
- Designer: Sanderson Group
- Theme: Warner Bros. films, Gremlins
- Vehicle type: Automated film can-like vehicles
- Vehicles: 7
- Riders per vehicle: 25
- Rows: 5
- Riders per row: 5
- Other names: The Great Gremlin Adventure, Gremlin Invasion, Warner Bros. Hollywood Classics

Warner Bros. Classics and The Great Gremlin Adventure was a dark ride located at Warner Bros. Movie World on the Gold Coast, Australia, and Warner Bros. Movie World in Bottrop, Germany (now Movie Park Germany). The ride has been replaced with the Scooby-Doo Spooky Coaster and Van Helsing's Factory in the two parks respectively.

== History ==
On 3 June 1991, Warner Bros. Movie World opened to the public. One of its original attractions was Warner Bros. Classics and The Great Gremlin Adventure. A duplicate of the Australian attraction opened with Warner Bros. Movie World Germany (later renamed Movie Park Germany) on 30 June 1996. It was named Gremlin Invasion. The ride's soft-opening was on 29 June 1996.

On 9 September 2001, Warner Bros. Movie World in Australia announced that they would be closing the attraction to make way for a new attraction set to open in 2002. This was due to the ride's general repair and upkeep and repeatability; the Gremlin animatronics' skins would constantly deteriorate under the ride's conditions of water and lighting and from strong solvents used by the maintenance staff, and literally melt and fall apart after some time, and the ride vehicles would crash into each other, damaging the frames and having to be fitted with whiskers at the front. The 1984 film had become quite dated and tedious to those who had seen it before, and there was an option for either the long or short versions of the outtakes in the ride's pre-show to be played. One of the police cars at the end of the ride was sold to a neighbour, who had it in his driveway from September to October 2001. On 17 June 2002, the Scooby-Doo Spooky Coaster opened in the location of Warner Bros. Classics and The Great Gremlins Adventure. In Germany, Gremlin Invasion was used for the Halloween Horror Festival as Terror Train from 1 October 2002 to October 2007. The ride's winding backdrops were perfect for the cast members dressed as monsters who could scare the passing guests. Gremlin Invasion remained open until mid-September 2004, a month before the closure of Warner Bros. Movie World Germany on 31 October 2004. The park reopened on 19 March 2005 as Movie Park Germany, however, the ride remained closed. From October 2008 to October 2010, the ride was used for the Halloween Horror Festival as The Dark Goldmine. On 18 June 2011, the ride was replaced with Van Helsing's Factory, a Gerstlauer Bobsled roller coaster. Movie Park Germany auctioned 25 film reels from Gremlin Invasion on Marktplaats.nl and eBay on 11 March 2011, and auctioned some Gremlin animatronics on eBay for €1,000 in favor of AGSB Bottrop on 27 April 2011. The auctions expired on 13 March 2011, 14 March 2011 and 26 June 2011. On 10 December 2012, the hydraulic winch and cable, hydraulic power pack and hoses, film projectors (with light box fittings), speakers and an antique wheelchair used in Warner Bros. Classics and The Great Gremlins Adventure were put up for auction at Village Roadshow Studios.

At Warner Bros. Movie World in Australia, many elements of the ride still exist to this day. The original facade for the attraction exists behind Scooby-Doo Spooky Coaster's Spooky Island castle facade. Two of the theatres that were used in the pre-show exist adjacent to the replacement ride's queue, while two others are used as a staff training room and a storage room. The unloading station still exists (albeit with theming removed) and is used as an evacuation path from Scooby-Doo Spooky Coaster. Finally, the other police car from the unloading station is used in Superman Escape. In Van Helsing's Factory at Movie Park Germany, the movie theatres are used for the queue and pre-show, the Factory Shop (souvenir shop) and for storage; the first chain lift hill is located near Gremlin Invasion's unloading station, which still exists, an ALF animatronic is seen inside the crane at the last turn before the second lift hill, one of the telephone booths from Gremlin Invasion's prop dock is featured at the end of the ride, and the fire truck at the end of Gremlin Invasion is seen in the scrapyard. A Gizmo animatronic was initially hidden in the engine of one of the scrapyard cards, but was removed and relocated to the ride's maintenance area shortly after its opening, due to Warner Bros. taking issue with it being seen by the guests without any license paid by Parques Reunidos. The Gizmo animatronic from the ride's loading station can be found in one of Movie Park Germany's meeting rooms. Movie Park Studio Tour, an Intamin Multi Dimension Coaster, contains various callbacks to the park's defunct rides and attractions, including Gremlin Invasion; a plush toy of Gizmo and production drawings for the ride can be found in the library and on a sketch table and walls during the queue area, the film archive at the beginning is an allusion to the ride and even uses shelf and film reel props from it, and one of the Gremlin animatronics from the ride's shipping dock is seen among the film props, with a hat obscuring his face.

== Ride ==
=== Australia ===
Guests would queue for Warner Bros. Classics and The Great Gremlins Adventure on the outside of the show building. Groups of riders would be admitted into the building labelled "Warner Bros. Classics and The Great Gremlins Adventure" and "Stage 12", complete with a Gremlin running through a clapperboard labelled "Gremlin Invasion", and posters for Warner Bros. films (when the ride first opened, the building was labelled "Screening Rooms", and above the entrance to the building were clapperboards for Torrid Zone, No Time for Comedy, Gentleman Jim, Hollywood Canteen, The Voice of the Turtle, June Bride, The Fountainhead, Doc Hollywood and Other People's Money). Inside, guests would be welcomed by a cast member and ushered into one of eight air-conditioned movie theatres. Here, the riders would watch some outtakes from various Warner Bros. films such as Doc Hollywood, Cowboy from Brooklyn, Lethal Weapon 2, No Time for Comedy, Tovarich, Ballots or Bullets, Silver River and John Loves Mary, before the screening was interrupted as the Gremlins had taken over (via footage from Gremlins 2: The New Batch).

After exiting the theatre and going down a corridor with a Gremlin hanging from the ceiling and cackling, guests enter the loading station/control room, where they find an animatronic Beetlejuice, who has been brought in by Warner Bros. to lead the guests to safety, and is seen facing four televisions that function as video surveillance cameras, as their screens display different rooms in the ride. Up to 25 riders board a single automated vehicle resembling a film can. Beetlejuice turns around and tells the guests that the Gremlins broke free from their cans in the film vault. They started opening more cans, accidentally opening one of his own and releasing him. He says that he will get the guests out of the building safely, after which the guests' vehicle navigates its way into the film vault in order to escape the Gremlins. The guests are taken for a slow trip through the vault, editing rooms, the prop dock and the film laboratory, with Beetlejuice appearing periodically during the tour as the Gremlins wreak havoc. In the prop dock, Beetlejuice says that he and Warner Bros. have also called for outside help, and a Burbank Fire Department fire truck arrives while Gizmo covers his eyes from the truck's lights. The guests enter the shipping dock, where the Gremlins are spraying each other with water from fire hoses. Beetlejuice announces, "It's showtime!", before electrocuting himself and causing electrocution to the Gremlins, killing them. The guests stop at some doors as they hear sirens wailing and police cars screeching their tires and crashing from outside, before exiting the building and being unloaded. Riders would exit past two crashed police cars, similar to those used in the Police Academy Stunt Show (with Gizmo and Beetlejuice inside one of them). Beetlejuice laughs and asks the guests, "Did I tell ya I'd get ya out? Now I ask ya, am I not the ghost with the most?", and Gizmo begins singing.

=== Germany ===
Guests would queue for Gremlin Invasion on the outside of the show building. Groups of guests are admitted into the building labelled "Warner Bros. Studio", complete with a Gremlin running through a clapperboard labelled "Gremlin Invasion", and posters for Warner Bros. films. Inside, guests would be ushered into one of eight air-conditioned movie theatres. Here, the riders would watch some outtakes from various Warner Bros. films (such as John Loves Mary, Batman Returns, Doc Hollywood, Outbreak, Cowboy from Brooklyn and Maverick), hosted by Sandra Bullock and accompanied by Franz von Suppé's "Ein Morgen, ein Mittag, ein Abend in Wien" and A Corny Concerto's version of Johann Strauss' "The Blue Danube". Following the outtakes was a live television recording of ALF, where ALF (voiced by Tommi Piper) tries to grab Lucky from a kitchen cabinet for his supper. However, he pulls out a Gremlin instead, who attacks him. As ALF screams in terror and calls for an exterminator, other Gremlins pop out and begin destroying the set and attacking the television crew. One Gremlin pops up in front of the camera, electrocutes the cameraman (who lets out the Wilhelm scream), and knocks the camera to the floor. As ALF encourages the guests to flee, the projector breaks and a Gremlin rides the projectionist's back as he runs off, while two other Gremlins make shadow puppets (via footage from Gremlins 2: The New Batch).

After exiting the theatre and going down a corridor with a Gremlin hanging from the ceiling and cackling, guests enter the loading station/control room, where they meet an animatronic ALF and Gizmo, the former of whom is facing four televisions that function as video surveillance cameras, as their screens display different rooms in the ride. Next to Gizmo lies the control room operator, having been killed by the Gremlins. Up to 20 riders board a single automated vehicle resembling a film can. ALF turns around and greets the guests, telling them that the Gremlins broke free from their cans in the film vault (here named the film archive), and that he will help them escape through the film archive and get out of the building safely. The guests' vehicle navigates its way into the film archive, where ALF tells them that he will take them to a safe place there. He tells them not to touch the film reels as they are the only surviving copies of 6000 Warner Bros. movies. However, the Gremlins have begun messing with the film reels and the shelves containing them (film cans for films like The Incredible Mr. Limpet, Caligula, Lean on Me, Buddy's Song and Lethal Weapon 3 can be found in the shelves). Five Gremlins play tug of war, and guests enter the recording studio, where two Gremlins hold film strips in front of flashlights, projecting them on the wall, and move them up and down. One of the film strips depicts frames from The Blue Angel. Guests then go past the editing rooms, where the Gremlins tie a projectionist up in film and lower and raise him from the ceiling, stand on their heads while watching television, perform hula dances, mess with ALF's face as Gizmo watches on from a film can, ride each other like cowboys, and hold ripped paper as the scene from Gremlins 2: The New Batch in which Gizmo multiplies plays on two monitors. They also bind a man sitting at a desk labelled "Despatch" and cover up his mouth in film (this animatronic was redesigned in 2000 and had his mouth gagged with masking tape), and the man calls for help on the telephone. Next, the guests enter the prop dock, where the Gremlins pose as Lola Lola from The Blue Angel while the song "They Call Me Naughty Lola" is heard playing in the background, recreate a classic Western film scene, with ALF behind bars on a jail set calling for the guests to help him out; dress as Robin Hood and Little John and fight with quarterstaffs as the Superman theme song plays, fly the Batwing from Batman, and attack an out-of-control vehicle and the guests (actually dummies) riding in it as it leaves the film laboratory, making it nearly crash into the guests' vehicle. Gizmo helps ALF escape from jail, and as the latter sits atop a tower made of televisions (and a computer monitor), they start planning their method of getting rid of the Gremlins.

Guests then enter the costume department, where the Gremlins dress in marching band uniforms, play the tuba, pop out of the tuba as it is being played, dress as pirates and fire cannons, and sit in front of a make-up mirror and dress as werewolves. Finally, the guests' vehicle enters the shipping dock/lighting room, where the Gremlins are spraying each other with water from fire hoses and cackling. ALF kills the Gremlins by electrocuting them with a control panel as Gizmo watches on, and they disappear (the Gremlins' disappearance was achieved with the Pepper's ghost illusion). The guests stop at some doors as two surviving Gremlins pop out of crates, and the sound of a siren wailing is heard, followed by a loud crash. After that the doors open, allowing the guests to exit the building and stop at the unloading station. Riders would exit past a Los Angeles Fire Department fire truck with ALF (who congratulated them on making it out when the ride first opened) behind its wheel and Gizmo standing on its hood, and a Gremlin who popped out of a crate. The guests could also choose to walk through the hallway at the exit after the ride. There, a Gremlin would pop out of the ceiling, cackling at them.

== Ride design ==
Warner Bros. Classics and The Great Gremlin Adventure was originally designed by Village Roadshow Theme Parks for Warner Bros. Movie World in Australia. Alan Griffith Architect formed a strong working relationship with Warner Bros. International Recreation Enterprises on the ride. The ride system was designed by Australian Electric Vehicles and controlled by ASI systems from Anitech Systems Inc. The ride's theming, props, fire doors and smoke detectors were designed and installed by Sanderson Group. The audio-animatronics featured in the ride were built by Showtronix, designed by Greg McKee, Matt Ward, John Cox and Chris Chitty. They had designed a demonstration Bugs Bunny animatronic in 1989, which won them the multi-$1,000,000 contract to design the animatronics for Warner Bros. Movie World in 1990, including the ones in Warner Bros. Classics and The Great Gremlin Adventure. McKee supervised construction and artistic finish of the animatronics, and designed the Gizmo and Beetlejuice animatronics. The Gremlin animatronics were all sculpted from scratch at a larger size than the puppets from the Gremlins films, but were based on the proportions and color schemes of Rick Baker's original puppets. They had latex covering, sometimes a perspex body form velcroed onto the frame. The heads and hands were made from foam latex, and the skins were made from polyurethane. The animatronics were all largely static or reactive, and mounted on springs to bases that shook them. They were raced out in a very short time frame in large numbers, with some of them lacking articulated faces or body parts. The eyemechs were standardised and used cables. The Batwing that one of the Gremlins flies in the prop dock was a full-size replica donated to Warner Bros. Movie World by a local propmaker.

The German ride, Gremlin Invasion, was manufactured by Intamin, Australian Electric Vehicles and Barbisan & Brügger AG, and like Warner Bros. Classics and The Great Gremlin Adventure, its ride system was controlled by ASI systems from Anitech Systems Inc. Zeitgeist Design and Production's Ryan Harmon conceived, wrote, and managed the design team for Warner Bros. Movie World Germany's worth of rides, shows and attractions, including Gremlin Invasion. Alan Griffith Architect and Alder Constructions were also involved in the ride's development. The ride's theming (including the black-and-white background from the prop dock) was designed and painted by Botticelli's - Atelier der angewandten Malerei and Sanderson Group. The audio-animatronics featured in the ride were designed by Showtronix. Unlike Warner Bros. Classics and The Great Gremlin Adventure, most of the Gremlin animatronics in Gremlin Invasion had animated faces and utilised red LED lights for their eyes. The internal frames, shells and molds of the animatronics had already been developed by the time Warner Bros. Movie World Germany was greenlit, so a lot of the basic development work was done and detailed movements could be developed and added more economically to them.
