= Scooby-Doo Spooky Coaster =

Enclosed steel wild mouse roller coaster

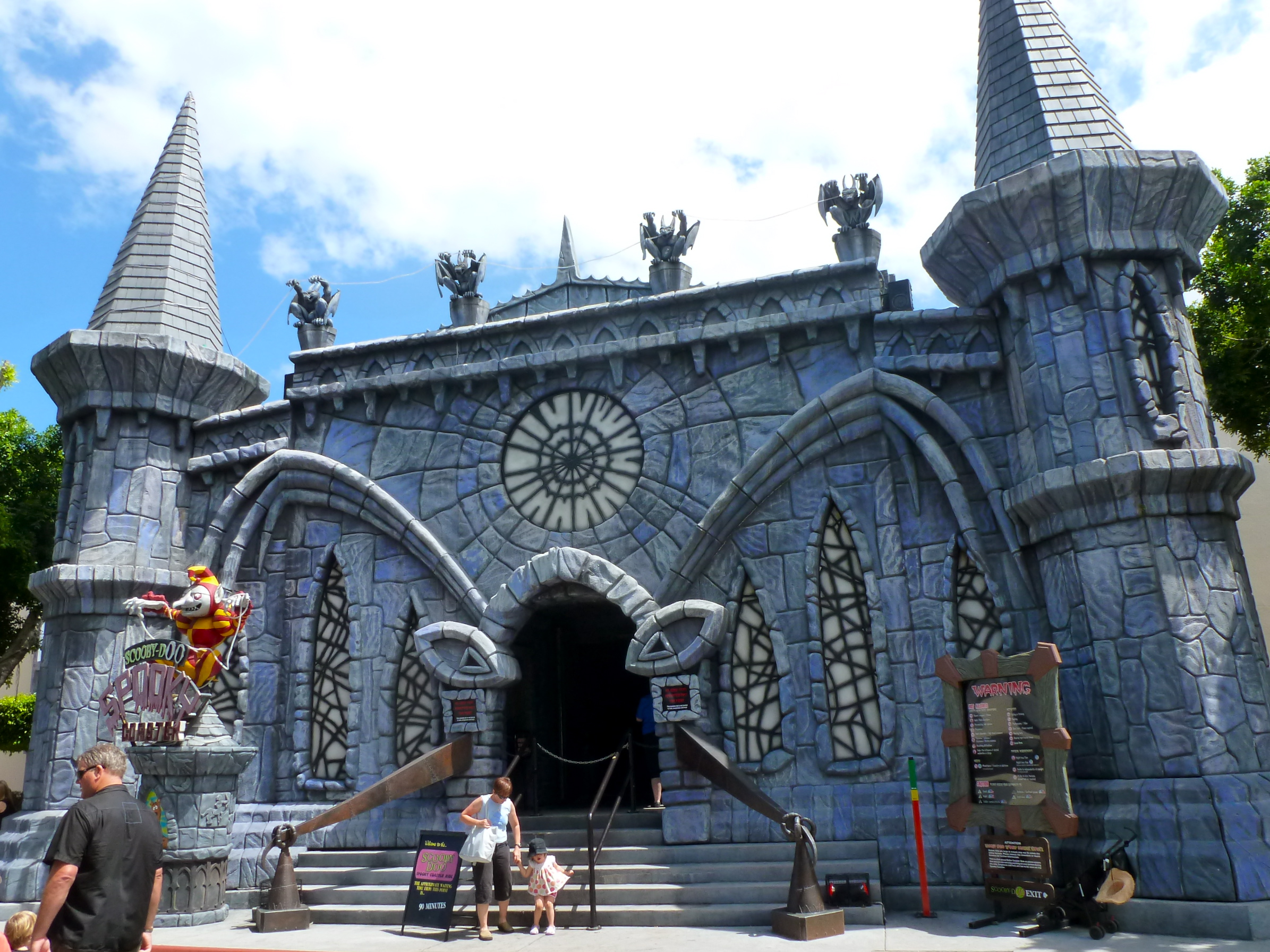
- Scooby-Doo Spooky Coaster's entrance is a replica of the Spooky Island Castle as seen in the 2002 film.

Warner Bros. Movie World
- Location: Warner Bros. Movie World
- Coordinates: 27°54′28″S 153°18′39.8″E
- Status: Operating
- Opening date: 17 June 2002
- Cost: A$13,000,000
- Replaced: Warner Bros. Classics & Great Gremlins Adventure

General statistics
- Type: Steel – Wild Mouse – Enclosed
- Manufacturer: Mack Rides
- Designer: Warner Bros. Movie World
- Model: Custom
- Lift/launch system: Vertical Elevator Lift
- Height: 17 m (56 ft)
- Drop: 10 m (33 ft)
- Length: 530 m (1,740 ft)
- Speed: 44.6 km/h (27.7 mph)
- Inversions: 0
- Duration: 4:13
- Capacity: 1000 riders per hour
- G-force: 2.4
- Height restriction: 110 cm (3 ft 7 in)
- Trains: 18 trains with a single car; riders arranged 2 across in 2 rows for a total of 4 riders per train
- Fast Track available in selected peak seasons
- Scooby-Doo Spooky Coaster at RCDB

Scooby-Doo Spooky Coaster is an enclosed steel wild mouse roller coaster located at Warner Bros. Movie World on the Gold Coast, Australia. It is based on the 2002 live action film Scooby-Doo, which was filmed at the studio adjacent to the park at the same time the ride was being constructed. In 2018 the ride underwent a significant theming overhaul and reopened in December under the name Scooby-Doo Spooky Coaster: Next Generation with a new ride storyline, new theming (still based on the 2002 film) and new special effects. It closed for refurbishment in January 2023 and it reopened on 14 December 2025.

== History ==
On 3 June 1991, Warner Bros. Movie World opened to the public with Warner Bros. Classics & Great Gremlins Adventure as one of its original attractions. In late 2001, Warner Bros. Movie World decided that they would be closing the attraction to make way for a new attraction set to open in 2002. On 17 June 2002, the Scooby-Doo Spooky Coaster opened to the public. Scooby-Doo Spooky Coaster is one of the park's first attractions still standing today. In 2002 when the ride was initially released, it utilised the space it had for an interesting ride experience. In 2018, Warner Bros. Movie World closed the attraction for several months. The ride re-opened in late 2018, now advertised as Scooby-Doo Spooky Coaster: Next Generation.

== Characteristics ==
=== Overview ===
Scooby-Doo Spooky Coaster is a Wild Mouse roller coaster manufactured by Mack Rides. Warner Bros. Movie World collaborated with Mack Rides to develop a Wild Mouse roller coaster that was unlike the previous models (such as The Fly, Technic Coaster and Mulholland Madness). The ride is enclosed in a show building making it a dark ride.

=== Statistics ===
Scooby-Doo Spooky Coaster features 530 metres (1,740 ft) of track. The highest point, 17 metres (56 ft), is reached through the use of an elevator lift. The largest drop is 7 metres (23 ft) and is performed in reverse. At this point, riders reach the top speed of 44.6 kilometres per hour (27.7 mph). One cycle of the ride takes approximately 4 minutes and 13 seconds. The ride caters for approximately 1000 guests per hour.

=== Theme ===
The Scooby-Doo Spooky Coaster is themed around the 2002 live action film, Scooby-Doo. The main entrance facade is modelled after the Spooky Island Castle that is featured in the film. Additionally, the ride's eighteen vehicles are modelled on that used in the film. These vehicles seat four people, in two rows of two.

New theming was installed in late 2018 and the ride's name was slightly altered with "Next Generation" to reflect the update as well as the storyline changes.

=== On Ride Photo ===
The Scooby-Doo Spooky Coaster has an on ride photo in the first dark ride section on the ride. The photo is taken as riders drop in front of the swinging axes. This photo is available as part of the Fast Photo digital pass and viewable on screens in the exit retail store.

== Experience ==
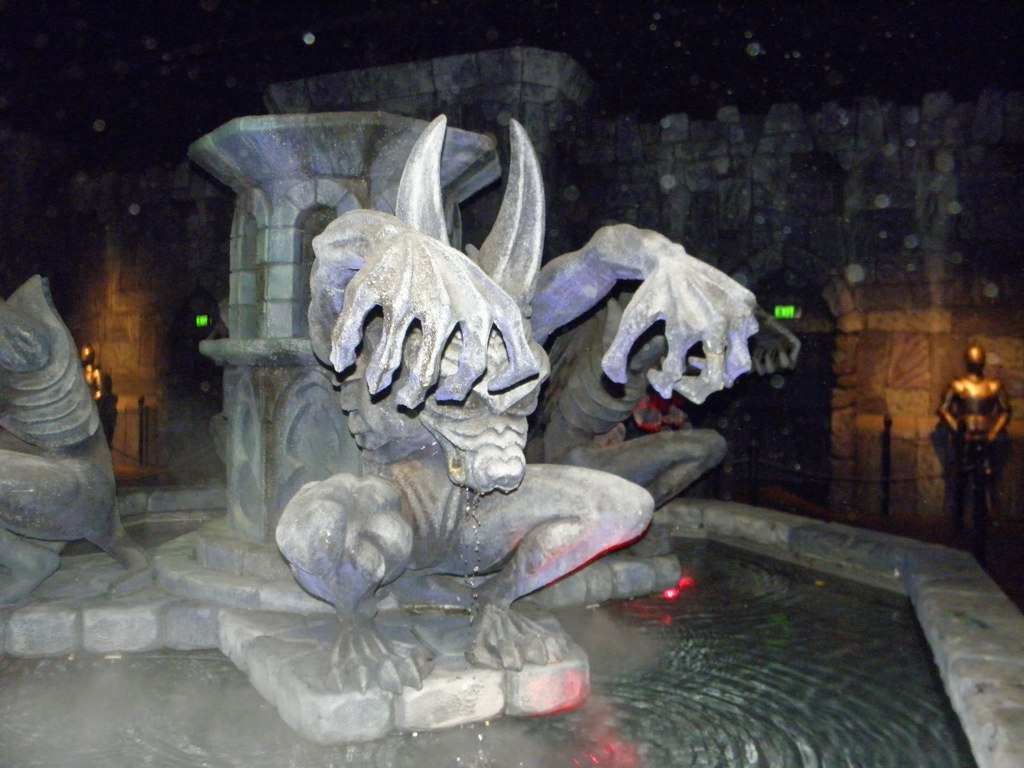
The monster fountain located in the main queue area of the ride.

=== Queue ===
The entrance to the Scooby-Doo Spooky Coaster is a replica of the Spooky Island Castle seen in the 2002 film. This façade hides a large sound stage where the actual ride exists. On most days, guests must walk up a few steps enter the castle and the ride's queue line. On busier days, the ride's outdoor overflow queue is utilised. It is located on the right hand side of the entrance and leads into the side of the castle façade. Once inside the castle riders are treated to the sight of a monster fountain and a making of video of the 2002 film. A series of queue switchbacks are located closer to the load station.

=== Ride ===
==== Original Version ====
Once the ride begins, the first part is like a typical dark ride, embellished with effects including a swinging axe and various other spooky-themed audio-animatronics displays. Along the way, an animatronic Scooby-Doo will tell the rider which way the carriage will go next until it reaches a platform.

As the platform ascends vertically it tilts from side to side giving riders the illusion that they will fall out. As it rises a short conversation between Scooby-Doo and Daphne can be heard. Once the carriage has reached the top of the elevator, and the top of the show building, it drops backwards 7 metres (23 ft) towards to turntable which spins the carriage around before continuing along the roller coaster track. This is where the true wild mouse section of the roller coaster begins. This section features various smoke, lighting and laser effects as well as a giant spider previously used in the Harry Potter Movie Magic Experience and Halloween Family Fun Nights. It is also musically accompanied by U.S. punk band MXPX playing a cover of the Scooby-Doo theme song. The ride ends with a final animatronic Scooby showing riders the way out of the wild mouse section, followed by one very small drop to get to the exit platform.

==== Next Generation (2018 update) ====
Although the ride's rollercoaster track is unaltered and its ghost train elements are still present, the ride's storyline has been significantly changed, although it is still themed to the 2002 film. Scooby-Doo now only appears at the beginning in his armor until the very end in the exit queue. However, his initial voice over and disembarkment audio remains in use.

The creatures from the movie have escaped their enclosures and are attacking the riders. After the ride exits the station, using projection mapping effects, the train is attacked by two of the monsters breaking down the right-side wall, but the train gets away in time. Following the usual Ghost Train section, Riders are greeted with the mirror scene which now uses more projection effects to display the two monsters attacking the vehicle.

The ride then passes by several voodoo statues before coming to the Platform lift. Daphne and Shaggy both spot and talk to Scrappy Doo who, as the lift rises, appears on screens surrounding the riders and changes into his own monster form, then roars at the riders. Shaggy then says his iconic quote from the battle with Scrappy, which is, "You're a bad puppy!", followed by the claw used in the first movie pulling out the Daemon Ritus from Scrappy's chest. The train then drops backwards to the turntable as before, however the turntable is now surrounded by a disco like box with mirrors and neon lights.

The traditional wild mouse section remains relatively unaltered, however, the vat carrying the souls from the movie now sits in the centre of the room.

As riders leave this section they are now greeted by two projection mapped screens on either side of the train, but as the disco skull on the ceiling shines, the creatures become afraid. The train then makes its final small drop, however this small section is now incorporated into the ride's storyline and a screen above it shows one of the creatures screaming in the "Tiki Doll Lounge". As riders disembark and pass through the lounge, Scooby-Doo is seen hiding in a hut saying "I'm scared!" This scene uses the same animatronic and audio previously used at the end of the ride albeit static. Riders exit through a gift shop to buy various articles of Scooby-Doo merchandise, as well as on-ride photos.

== See also ==
- Warner Bros. Classics & Great Gremlins Adventure
