= Beetlejuice (soundtrack) =

Beetlejuice (Original Motion Picture Soundtrack)

Soundtrack album by Danny Elfman
- Released: June 7, 1988
- Genre: Film soundtrack
- Length: 36:42
- Label: Geffen
- Producer: Danny Elfman

Danny Elfman chronology
Pee-wee's Big Adventure (1985)	Beetlejuice (Original Motion Picture Soundtrack) (1988)	Batman (1989)

Beetlejuice (Original Motion Picture Soundtrack) is the soundtrack to the 1988 film Beetlejuice directed by Tim Burton and stars Michael Keaton as the title character, alongside Alec Baldwin, Geena Davis, Jeffrey Jones, Catherine O'Hara and Winona Ryder. The album features the film's musical score composed by Danny Elfman and two original recordings performed by Harry Belafonte. The soundtrack was released through Geffen Records on June 7, 1988.

== Development ==
Danny Elfman composed the score for Beetlejuice in his second collaboration with Burton after Pee-wee's Big Adventure (1985). Even before he saw the film's rough cut, Elfman had written few cues based on the script and, he felt that "Oh, this is not the movie I was imagining in my head. This is something else completely." After watching the rough cut, he admitted that Keaton had brought the energy which was really intense and changes progressively throughout the film. Burton had provided him more creative freedom to work on the music and allowed him to experiment with the music.

He wanted to curate a traditional score, but after watching the film he wanted the music to be more unconventional which allowed him to arrange different pieces that played on offbeat in contrast to the traditional rhythmic structure. However, this was nearly felt to be unplayable by traditional musicians in the studio. While working on the first cut, many orchestra musicians felt strained while playing; Elfman recalled that he was lambasted by a conductor, adding "They tried to record it in England for a best-of album. The conductor in England looked at the score they're playing, and he picked it up and threw it on the floor and said, ‘This shit is unplayable’. But I kind of enjoyed it...I was a brat, and I thrived on negative energy".

Besides Elfman's score, four original recordings by Harry Belafonte were used in the film: "Day-O (The Banana Boat Song)", "Jump in the Line (Shake, Senora)" and "Man Smart, Woman Smarter" and "Sweetheart from Venezuela". The latter two of the songs were excluded from the soundtrack.

== Release ==
The album was first issued in LP, CD and cassette on June 7, 1988, through Geffen Records. A remastered and pressed vinyl edition was published through Waxwork Records and released on December 7, 2018.

== Track listing ==
No.	Title	Length
1.	"Main Titles (Beetlejuice)"	2:28
2.	"Travel Music"	1:07
3.	"The Book! / Obituaries"	1:29
4.	"Enter ... "The Family" / Sand Worm Planet"	2:49
5.	"The Fly"	0:48
6.	"Lydia Discovers?"	0:56
7.	"In the Model"	1:32
8.	"Juno's Theme"	0:47
9.	"Beetle-Snake"	2:09
10.	"Sold"	0:33
11.	"The Flier / Lydia's Pep Talk"	1:22
12.	"Day-O (The Banana Boat Song)" (Harry Belafonte)	3:04
13.	"The Incantation"	3:12
14.	"Lydia Strikes a Bargain.."	0:51
15.	"Showtime!"	1:07
16.	"Laughs"	2:32
17.	"The Wedding"	2:02
18.	"The Aftermath"	1:22
19.	"End Credits/Beetlejuice"	2:49
20.	"Jump In the Line (Shake, Señora)" (Harry Belafonte and The Original Trinidad Steel Band)	3:43
Total length:		36:42

== Reception ==
Heather Phares of AllMusic wrote "A perfect mix of silliness and spookiness, Beetlejuice remains one of Elfman's most consistent scores." Filmtracks.com gave 4 stars to the album and wrote "the score remains a devilishly enjoyable listening experience for fans of the film [...] If you're neither enthusiastic about his career nor Burton's films, though, then this score, despite its intelligence, could be extremely irritating. Nobody can argue about its unique style; like the film, we haven't heard or seen anything like it since." Thomas Glorieux of Maintitles called it as a "Crazy score captures some wicked moments, consider that good and bad" assigning 3 out of 5.

Jonathan Broxton of Movie Music UK wrote "The whole thing is a zany, quirky, madcap adventure that works wonderfully almost in spite of itself and needs to be in the collection of any serious student of Danny Elfman's career." Wilson Foreman and Alison Chapman of IndieWire dissected on the film's main title and summarized "There's restraint in Elfman's conducting — but also a lurking power worth listening to one, two, maybe even three times." It has been regarded as one of Elfman's best scores in his career. (Note: Attributed to multiple references:)

== Accolades ==
It received a Saturn Award nomination for Best Music and won the BMI Film Music Award.

== Charts ==
Chart (1988)	Peak position
U.S. Billboard 200	118
