= Bug juice =

Bug juice may refer to:

- Bug Juice, a Disney Channel reality series (1998–2001)
- Bug Juice: My Adventures at Camp, a revival of the Disney Channel series (2018)
- A slang term for super-sweet juice drinks made with artificially flavored powder that are often served at summer camps.
- United States Marine Corps slang for insect repellent
- Slang for moonshine or other forms of alcohol
