= Steve La Porte =

Makeup artist

- Born: Oklahoma City, Oklahoma, USA
- Other name: Steve LaPorte
- Occupation: makeup artist
- Years active: 1980–present

Steve La Porte is a makeup artist. He won at the 61st Academy Awards in the category of Best Makeup for his work on Beetlejuice. He shared his Oscar with Ve Neill and Robert Short.

He is also known for his work on TV, for shows such as LOST and The X-Files.

He has worked on over 80 films and TV shows since his start in 1980.
