= Robert Short (make-up artist) =

- Born: Robert Yates Short
- Occupations: makeup artist and visual effects artist
- Years active: 1976–present
- Website: http://www.robertshortfx.com/

Robert Short is a makeup artist. He won at the 61st Academy Awards in the category of Best Makeup for his work on Beetlejuice. He shared his Oscar with Steve La Porte and Ve Neill.

In addition to doing makeup, he also does visuals, and has done some writing and producing as well.

== Selected filmography ==
- Star Trek: The Motion Picture (1979)
- E.T. the Extra-Terrestrial (1982)
- Splash (1984)
- Beetlejuice (1988)
- Super Force (TV series) (1990–1992)
- Punisher: War Zone (2008)
