= USS Betelgeuse =

USS Betelgeuse may refer to the following ships of the United States Navy:

- USS Betelgeuse (AKA-11), was an Arcturus-class cargo ship, launched in 1939, struck in 1946, and scrapped in 1972.
- USS Betelgeuse (AK-260), was an Antares-class cargo ship, launched in 1944 as SS Colombia Victory, renamed 1952, and struck in 1974.
