= Chicago Film Critics Association Awards 2003 =

Annual US film awards ceremony

16th CFCA Awards

January 21, 2004

Best Film:
The Lord of the Rings:
The Return of the King

The 16th Chicago Film Critics Association Awards, honoring the best in film for 2003, were presented in 2004. The awards were originally going to be cancelled because the 2003 screener ban but when a judge ruled against it and the studios started to send out screeners again the awards were held after all.

Peter Jackson's final part of "The Lord of the Rings" trilogy "The Return of the King" and Sofia Coppola's "Lost in Translation" both won three awards.

== Winners ==
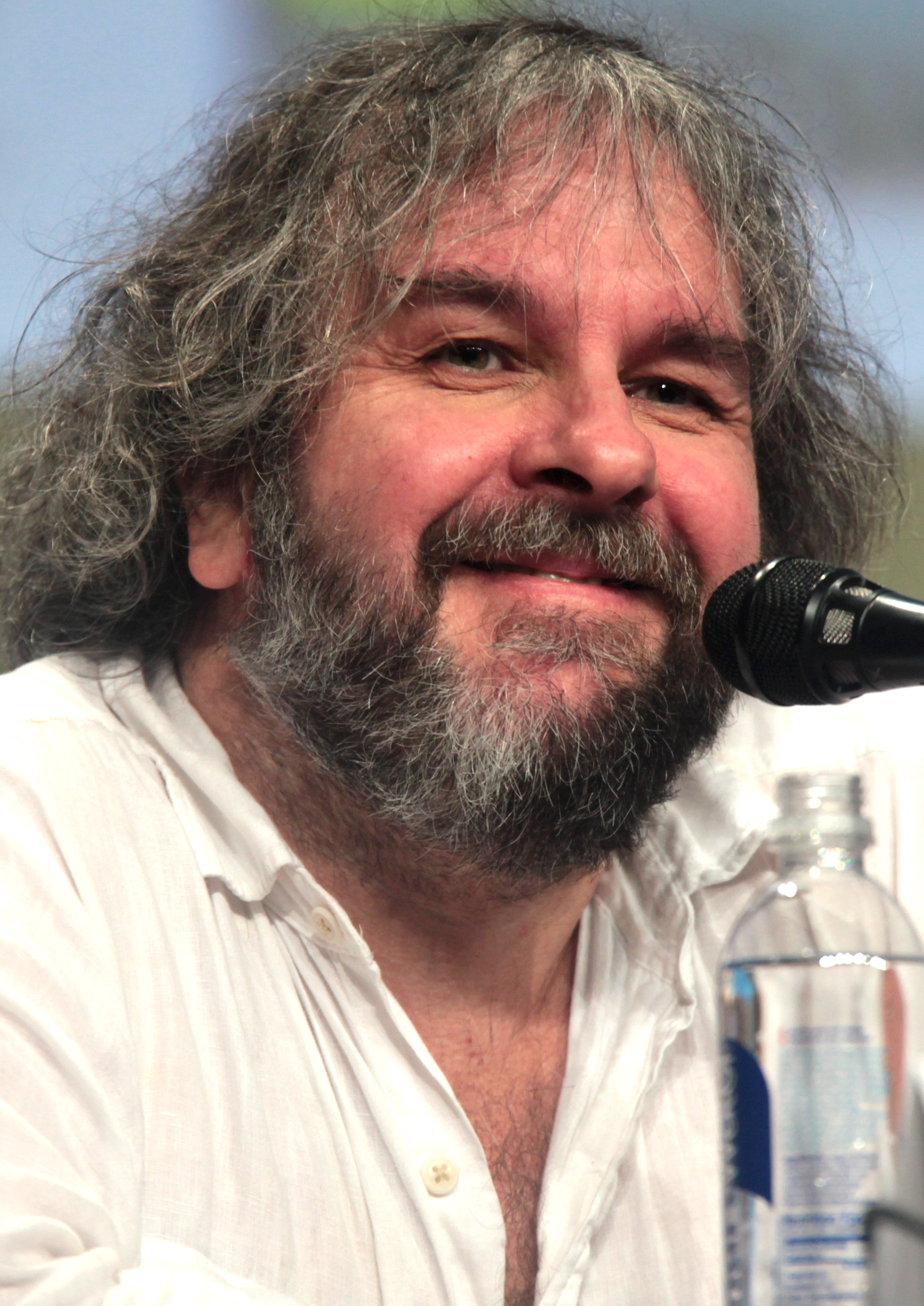
Peter Jackson, Best Director winner

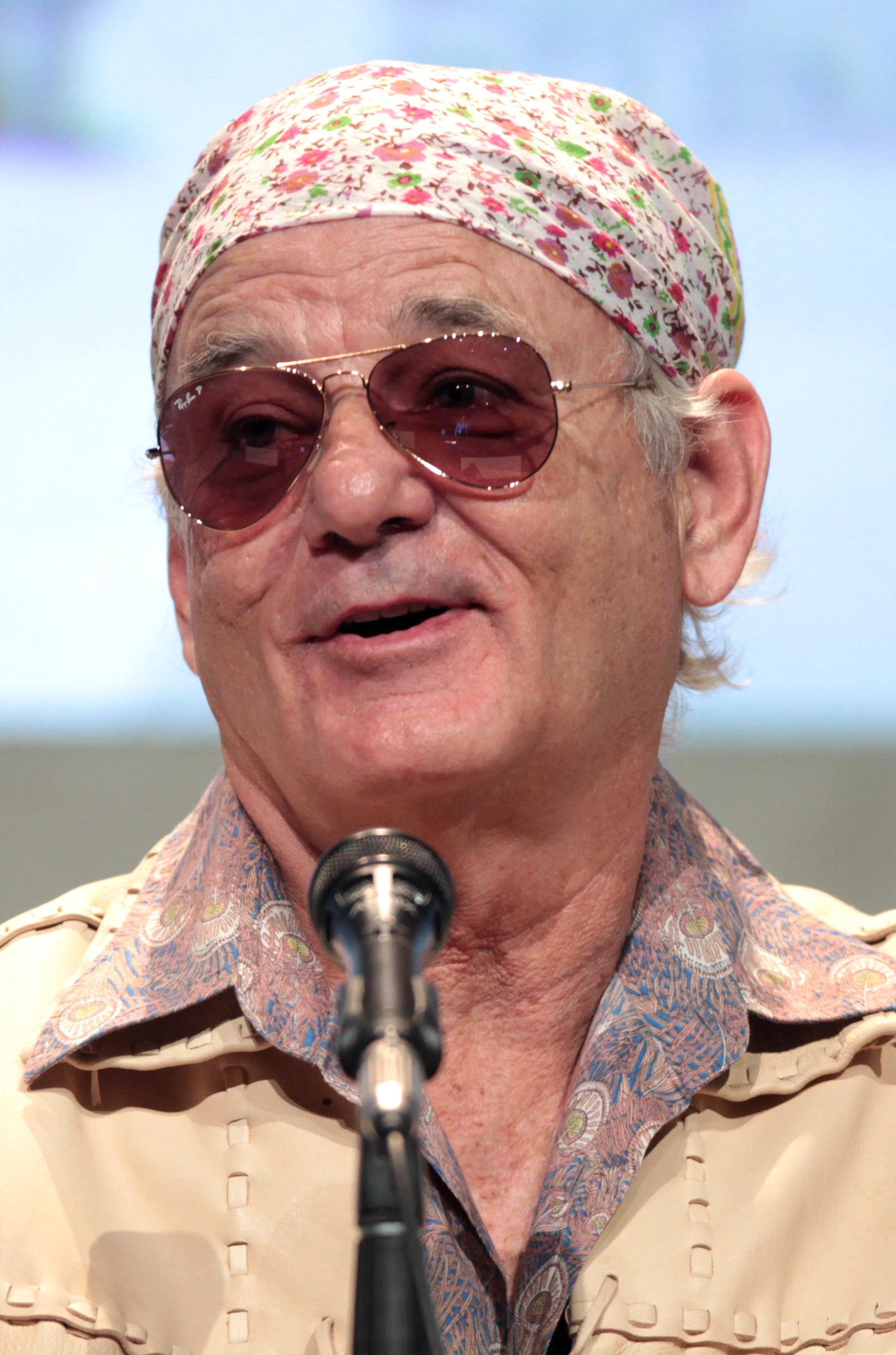
Bill Murray, Best Actor winner

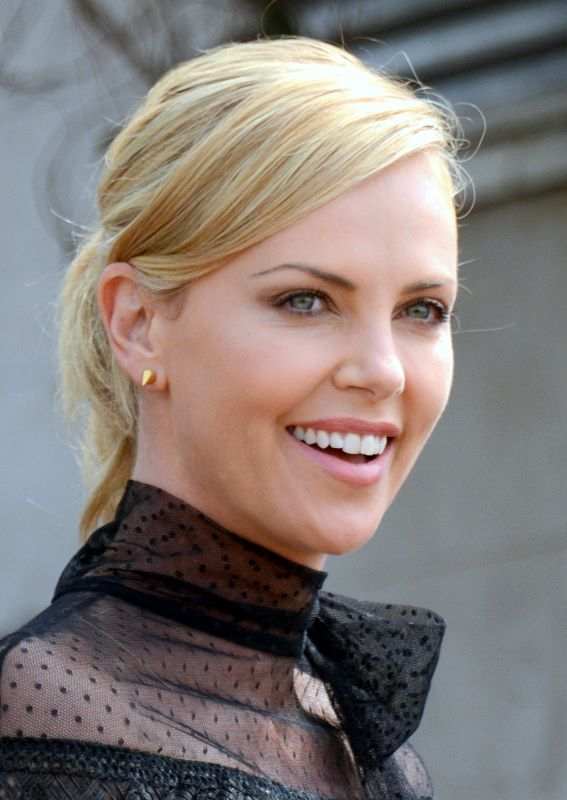
Charlize Theron, Best Actress winner

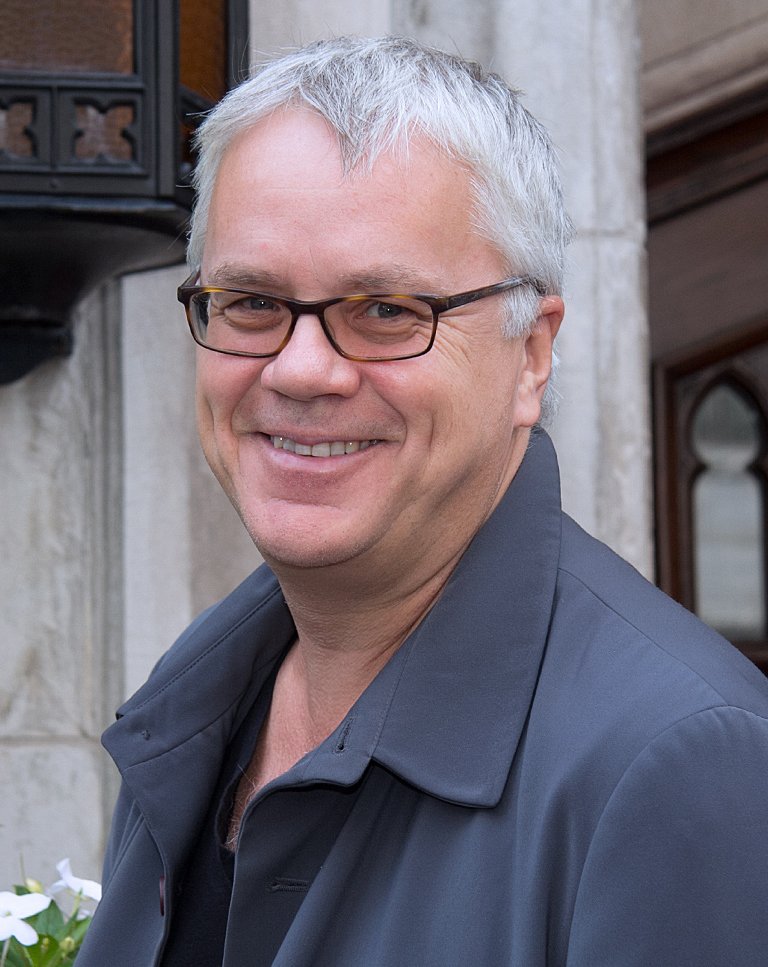
Tim Robbins, Best Supporting Actor winner

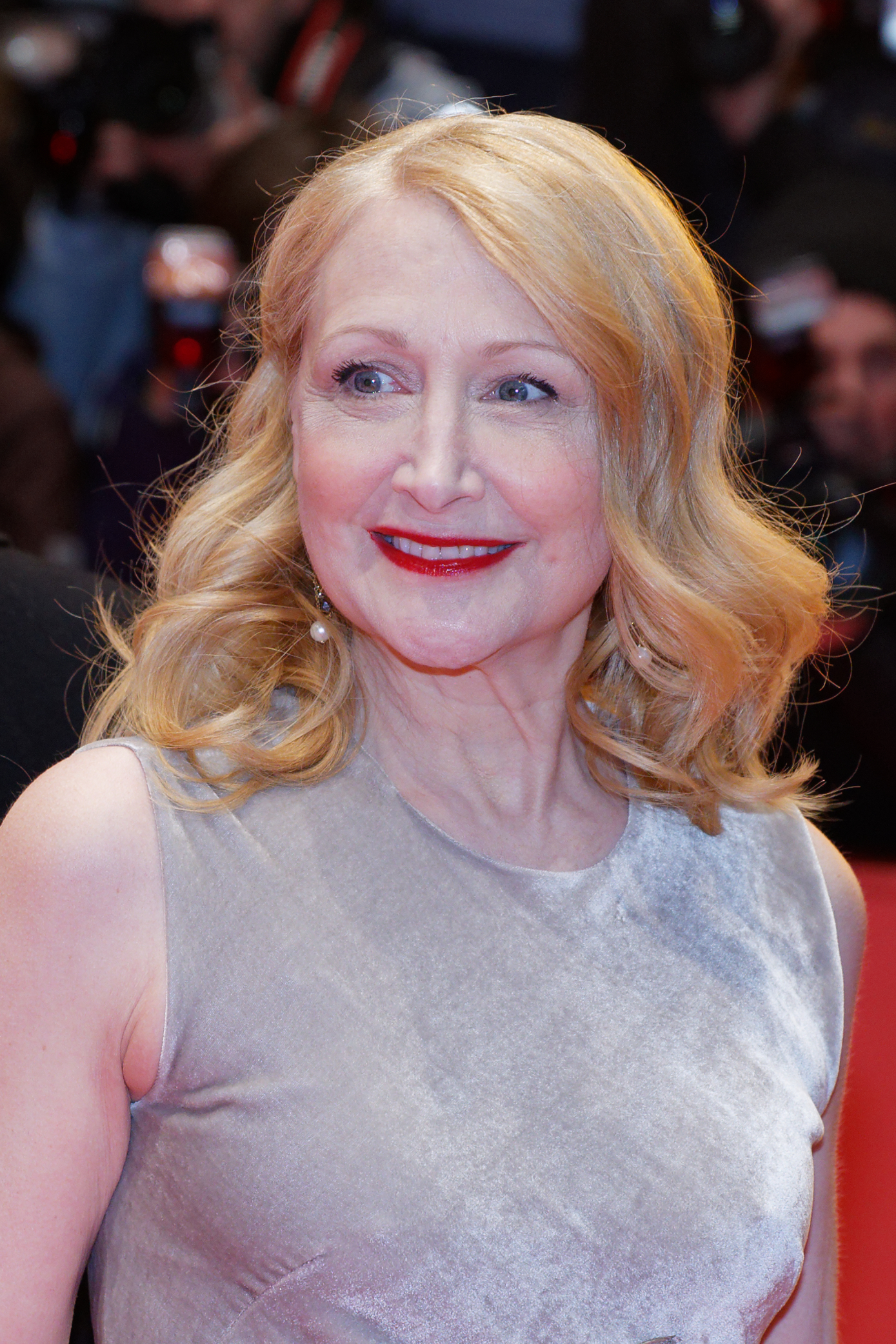
Patricia Clarkson, Best Supporting Actress winner

- Best Actor:
  - Bill Murray - Lost in Translation
- Best Actress:
  - Charlize Theron - Monster
- Best Cinematography:
  - Lost in Translation - Lance Acord
- Best Director:
  - Peter Jackson - The Lord of the Rings: The Return of the King
- Best Documentary Feature:
  - The Fog of War
- Best Film:
  - The Lord of the Rings: The Return of the King
- Best Foreign Language Film:
  - Cidade de Deus (City of God), Brazil/France/United States
- Best Original Score:
  - The Lord of the Rings: The Return of the King - Howard Shore
- Best Screenplay:
  - Lost in Translation - Sofia Coppola
- Best Supporting Actor:
  - Tim Robbins - Mystic River
- Best Supporting Actress:
  - Patricia Clarkson - Pieces of April
- Most Promising Filmmaker:
  - Shari Springer Berman and Robert Pulcini - American Splendor
- Most Promising Performer:
  - Keisha Castle-Hughes - Whale Rider
