= List of Beetlejuice video games =

Three video games based on the 1988 American film Beetlejuice (as well its animated TV adaptation) were released in 1990, 1991, and 1992. In addition, a Beetlejuice expansion pack featuring maps, playable characters and missions was released in 2017 as part of the Lego Dimensions crossover video game "fun packs" line.

== Beetlejuice (1991) ==
Beetlejuice is a video game developed by Rare and released for the Nintendo Entertainment System in May 1991. It blends elements of the film universe with elements of the animated series.

== Adventures of Beetlejuice: Skeletons in the Closet (1991) ==
Adventures of Beetlejuice: Skeletons in the Closet is a video game released for MS-DOS in late 1991.

Adventures of Beetlejuice: Skeletons in the Closet was developed by Riedel Software Productions and published by Hi Tech Expressions. This version is based on the animated cartoon series rather than the feature film. As Beetlejuice, the player must battle various skeletons and other monsters by shooting loogie projectiles and protecting Lydia as she cleans up the resulting mess.

== Beetlejuice (1992) ==
Beetlejuice: Horrific Hijinx from the Neitherworld! is a video game created by Rare and published by Acclaim Entertainment (Note: Released under the LJN brand name.) for the Nintendo Game Boy in 1992. It is based on the Beetlejuice animated television series.

The game begins with the player taking control of Beetlejuice as he attempts to get rid of all the ghosts that he invited into Lydia Deetz's house (where she lives with her father and step-mother). He must rescue Lydia from the evil Astoroth. Using bio-exorcist magic, players must defeat undead creatures through the cemetery and inside the Neitherworld. Players can ride on a minecart and a Pogosnake (that operates in a similar fashion to Super Mario World's Yoshi). There are some elements of animated violence along with a dark Goth theme.

== Lego Dimensions: Beetlejuice Fun Pack (2017) ==
In September 2017, a licensed Beetlejuice fun pack for the crossover video game Lego Dimensions was released as one of the 10 franchises owned by Warner Bros. to appear in the game. The release consisted of maps based on locations in the film, playable characters, and missions. It is not a standalone video game, but rather an expansion pack for the existing game Lego Dimensions.

== MultiVersus (2024) ==
Betelgeuse appears in MultiVersus from its second season.
