= Show building =

Show building is the name often given to various enclosed structures at theme parks that contain attractions such as rides and entertainment shows. The exteriors of such buildings may be themed on some or all sides, but their hidden "backstage" areas are normally very utilitarian, resembling warehouses or sound stages.

== Architectural features ==
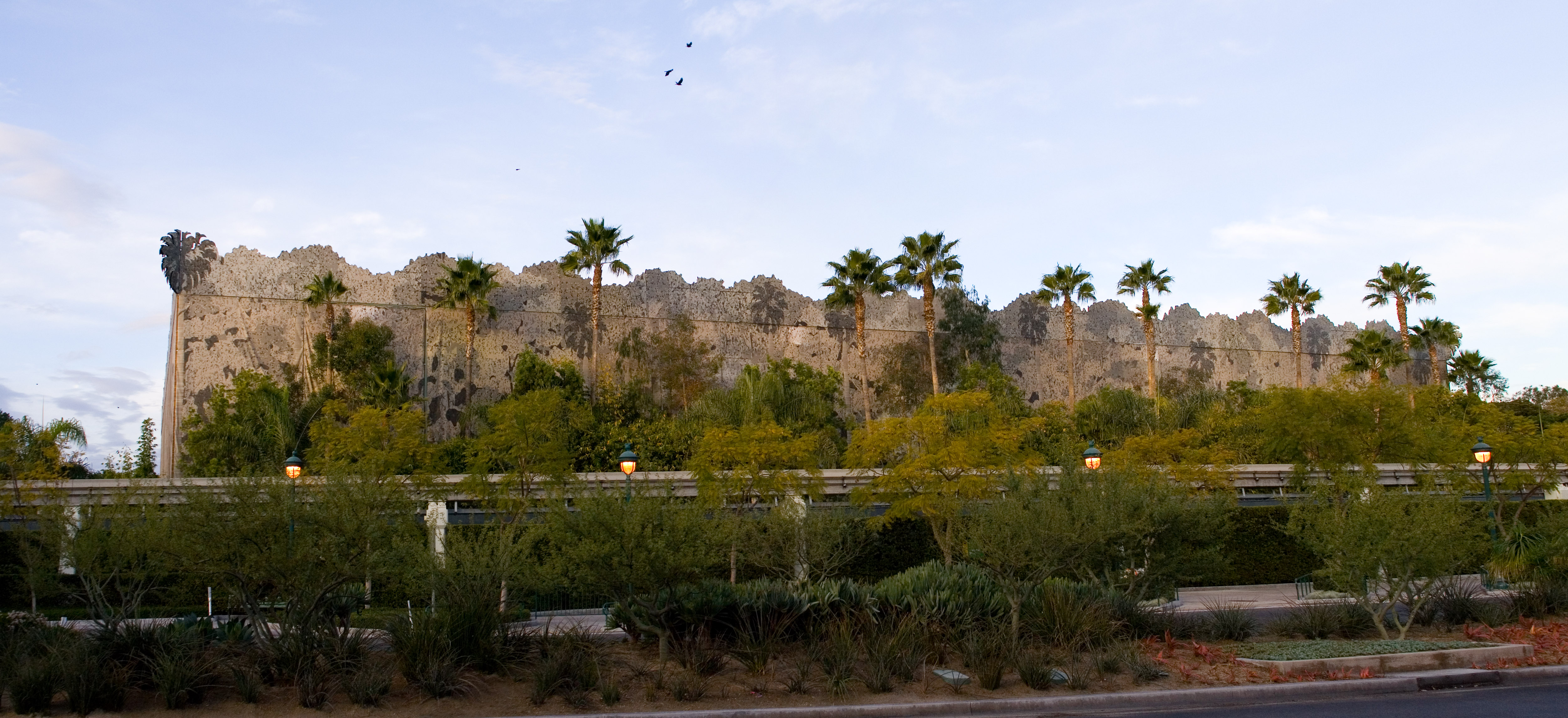
This show building houses the Indiana Jones Adventure at Disneyland. It is visible from outside the park, but it is hidden from guests in the park by tree-covered berms.

Unthemed areas of show buildings typically have simple, practical walls with flat roofs. Doors allow employees to enter and exit, and provide exits for guests during emergency or temporary ride shutdowns. One or more ladders and/or stairwells are often installed for roof access, and sometimes for access to scenes or backstage rooms that are located above ground level. Louvers, downspouts, electrical cables, and artificial lighting (often wall packs) are common sights as well.

== Maintaining the illusion ==
Techniques vary for hiding the buildings' industrial nature from the eyes of park guests. The most common ways include planting foliage to obstruct the views, adding themed exteriors to the visible areas, painting visible surfaces with colors that blend with the surroundings, and adding mounds of earth (berms) or solid walls between guests and buildings. They may also be built partially or completely below ground level. Disneyland, for instance, contains many show buildings, some of which are disguised on all sides. One example is the building containing Mr. Toad's Wild Ride, Peter Pan's Flight, and Alice in Wonderland, which features themed facades of castle walls and a quaint European village. At attractions such as the Haunted Mansion, most of the experience takes place in a green show building concealed behind a berm that separates it from the themed "mansion", with the two structures connected by an underground passageway. All of the Disney theme parks utilize similar techniques to some extent.

Some theme parks take less rigorous approaches. Universal Studios Hollywood hides many of its show buildings in the same fashion, but other buildings, such as that housing Revenge of the Mummy, are allowed to remain (as a whole or in part) as real-world examples of utilitarian sound stages. Some parks make no attempt to hide show buildings from guests and/or people outside the property, usually due to the cost involved, space limitations, and/or lack of interest in hiding the structures. For instance, all the buildings of the Santa Cruz Beach Boardwalk are clearly visible from Beach Street, which passes directly behind them. Similarly, the show building at Knott's Berry Farm that formerly contained Kingdom of the Dinosaurs is clearly visible from Western Avenue, just a few yards away.
