= Beetlejuice =

1988 film by Tim Burton

- Theatrical release poster by Carl Ramsey
- Directed by: Tim Burton
- Screenplay by: Michael McDowell; Warren Skaaren
- Story by: Michael McDowell; Larry Wilson
- Produced by: Michael Bender; Larry Wilson; Richard Hashimoto
- Starring: Alec Baldwin; Geena Davis; Jeffrey Jones; Catherine O'Hara; Winona Ryder; Michael Keaton
- Cinematography: Thomas E. Ackerman
- Edited by: Jane Kurson
- Music by: Danny Elfman
- Production company: The Geffen Company
- Distributed by: Warner Bros.
- Release date: March 30, 1988
- Running time: 92 minutes
- Country: United States
- Language: English
- Budget: $15 million
- Box office: $84.6 million

Beetlejuice is a 1988 American comedy horror film directed by Tim Burton from a screenplay by Michael McDowell and Warren Skaaren based on a story by McDowell and Larry Wilson. The film stars Michael Keaton as Betelgeuse, (Note: The title character's name is variously spelled "Betelgeuse", "Beetle Juice", and "Beetlejuice" in the film, script, and credits. The "Betelgeuse" spelling is used throughout this article for consistency.) along with Alec Baldwin, Geena Davis, Jeffrey Jones, Catherine O'Hara, and Winona Ryder.

The plot revolves around Adam and Barbara Maitland, a recently deceased couple. As ghosts, they are not allowed to leave their house. They contact Betelgeuse, a sleazy "bio-exorcist", to scare the house's new inhabitants away. The film prominently features music from Harry Belafonte's albums Calypso and Jump Up Calypso.

Beetlejuice was released in the United States on March 30, 1988, by Warner Bros. Pictures. The film was a critical and commercial success, grossing $84 million against a $15 million budget. It won the Academy Award for Best Makeup and three Saturn Awards: Best Horror Film, Best Makeup, and Best Supporting Actress for Sylvia Sidney. The film's success spawned a media franchise, consisting of an animated television series, video games, a 2018 stage musical, and a 2024 sequel, Beetlejuice Beetlejuice.

== Plot ==
In Winter River, Connecticut, Adam and Barbara Maitland are spending their vacation decorating their large country home that local real estate agent Jane Butterfield constantly pesters them to sell. As a hobby, Adam is building a scale model of the town in the attic. While driving home from town, they swerve to avoid a stray dog, and their car plunges off a bridge and into the river. They arrive home but are unable to recall how they got there. When attempting to leave the house, Adam finds himself on Saturn's moon Titan, populated by enormous sandworms. This lasts mere seconds for him, but after Barbara rescues him, she tells him he was gone for two hours. After noticing they lack reflections and discovering a Handbook for the Recently Deceased, the couple realizes that they drowned in the river and are now ghosts.

The house is sold to New York City real estate developer Charles Deetz, his goth teenage daughter Lydia, and his second wife Delia, a talentless sculptor. Under the guidance of interior designer Otho Fenlock, Delia begins renovating the house with a new-wave aesthetic of postmodern art.

While consulting the handbook on how to eject the Deetzes, the Maitlands see an advertisement for "Betelgeuse". Following the handbook's guidelines, they travel to an otherworldly waiting room populated by other distressed souls. After navigating the afterlife's complex bureaucracy, the Maitlands return to their house, only to discover it completely redesigned. Their caseworker, Juno, informs them that three months have passed and they must remain in their house for one hundred twenty-five years before "moving on." She discourages them from contacting Betelgeuse, her former assistant-turned-freelance "bio-exorcist" who can only be summoned by uttering his name three times, and implores them to drive out the Deetzes themselves.

Adam and Barbara are invisible to Charles and Delia, thwarting their fright attempts. Lydia, however, can see them, which she attributes to her extrasensory perception. The Maitlands invoke Betelgeuse and are transported into the model, but find his crude, morbid demeanor offensive. The Maitlands possess Charles, Delia, and their wealthy friends during a dinner party, but their antics amuse the group, inspiring Charles to pitch a supernatural amusement park to investor Maxie Dean. The Deetzes uncover the model in the attic, where Otho finds the handbook. Betelgeuse transforms into a giant snake and terrorizes the Deetzes before Barbara banishes him back to the model.

Juno berates Adam and Barbara for releasing Betelgeuse, letting themselves be photographed by Lydia, and losing the handbook to Otho. A depressed Lydia discovers Betelgeuse inside the model and nearly summons him in exchange for passage to the afterlife, but the Maitlands return to stop her and talk her out of suicide.

Maxie and his wife arrive, demanding evidence of paranormal activity, but the Maitlands refuse to manifest again. Using the handbook, Otho summons Adam and Barbara by using their wedding clothes, but he mistakenly mixes the incantation with an exorcism, causing them to rapidly age and decay and leaving them in a state of perpetual suffering.

A horrified Lydia invokes Betelgeuse, who promises to help if she marries him so he can remain in the mortal world. He saves the Maitlands, disposes of the Deans, and drives away Otho before preparing to wed Lydia. The Maitlands attempt to banish Betelgeuse, who teleports Adam to the town model and Barbara to Titan. Barbara rides back inside on a sandworm, which devours Betelgeuse.

The Deetzes and the Maitlands agree to harmoniously live together. Meanwhile, Betelgeuse is stuck in the waiting room, waiting his turn to see a caseworker. He attempts to steal a numbered ticket from a witch doctor's ghost, who retaliates by shrinking his head.

== Cast ==
- Michael Keaton as Betelgeuse, pronounced as "Beetlejuice", a mischievous trickster spirit endowed with fantastic powers who calls himself a "bio-exorcist" professional, but is unpleasant, selfish, dishonest and depraved.
- Alec Baldwin as Adam Maitland, a ghost who, in life, was the owner of a hardware store in Winter River.
- Geena Davis as Barbara Maitland, Adam's wife and a spirit who, in life, devoted herself to the care of the home and her husband.
- Jeffrey Jones as Charles Deetz, a stressed-out former Wall Street investor seeking peace of mind after a mental breakdown.
- Catherine O'Hara as Delia Deetz, a hysterical, frivolous and anxious aspiring visual artist who is Charles's second wife and Lydia's stepmother.
- Winona Ryder as Lydia Deetz, a solitary and aspiring-photographer goth teenager with depressive and suicidal tendencies, as well as mediumistic powers.
- Sylvia Sidney as Juno, the Maitlands' caseworker.
- Robert Goulet as Maxie Dean, Charles's business partner
- Dick Cavett as Bernard, Delia's talent manager.
- Glenn Shadix as Otho Fenlock, an eccentric and arrogant friend of Delia and an enthusiast of decorative art and the paranormal.
- Annie McEnroe as Jane Butterfield, Sr., a real estate agent and Barbara's cousin who insists on selling the Maitland house.
- Simmy Bow as a janitor
- Maree Cheatham as Sarah Dean, Maxie's wife
- Carmen Filpi as a run-over man employed as a messenger in the waiting room
- Tony Cox as the preacher that Betelgeuse summons for his wedding with Lydia
  - Jack Angel additionally provided the character's voice
- Susan Kellermann as Grace, an art magazine writer and a guest at the Deetzs' dinner party.
- Adelle Lutz as Beryl, an editor and a guest at the Deetzs' dinner party.
- Patrice Martinez as Miss Argentina, the waiting room's receptionist
- Hugo Stanger as Old Bill, an elderly barber from Winter River.
- Rachel Mittelman as Jane Butterfield Jr., alias "Little Jane", Butterfield's daughter

== Production ==
=== Writing ===
After the financial success of Pee-wee's Big Adventure (1985), Burton became a "bankable" director and began working on a script for Batman with Sam Hamm. While Warner Bros. was willing to pay for the script's development, it was less willing to green-light Batman. Burton had become disheartened by the lack of imagination and originality in the scripts he had been sent, particularly Hot to Trot.

Michael McDowell and Larry Wilson formed a partnership (Pecos Productions) with entertainment attorney Michael Bender, and Beetlejuice was their first original project. After developing the story, McDowell and Wilson decided they would write the first draft of the screenplay together, while Wilson would only take 'Story By' credit, as well as his 'Producer' credit.

Burton had gotten to know and worked with McDowell and Wilson (who co-wrote the script for "The Jar", an episode of Alfred Hitchcock Presents that Burton directed). Burton read their first draft of Beetlejuice and liked it, but had other projects that kept him from becoming involved at that time.

The original script is far less comedic and much darker; the Maitlands' car crash is depicted graphically, with Barbara's arm crushed and the couple screaming for help as they slowly drown. A reference to this remains: Barbara remarks that her arm feels frozen upon returning home as a ghost. Instead of possessing the Deetzes and forcing them to dance during dinner, the Maitlands cause a vine-patterned carpet to come to life and attack them by lashing them to their chairs.

The character of Betelgeuse—envisioned in the first draft as a winged demon who takes on the form of a short man—is also intent on killing the Deetzes rather than scaring them and attempts to rape Lydia instead of forcing her to marry him. In this version of the script, Betelgeuse need only be exhumed from his grave to be summoned, after which he is free to wreak havoc; he can be summoned, but not controlled, by saying his name three times and wanders the world freely, tormenting different characters in different manifestations. The original script also has Lydia in a more secondary role, with the Deetze's having a second child, nine-year-old Cathy, who has the ability to communicate with ghosts and befriends the Maitlands.

In another version of the script, the film concludes with the Maitlands, Deetzes, and Otho conducting an exorcism ritual that destroys Betelgeuse, and the Maitlands transforming into miniature versions of themselves and moving into Adam's model of their home, which they refurbish to look like their house before the Deetzes moved in.

Co-author and producer Larry Wilson has talked about the reaction to the first draft by a prominent executive at Universal, where Wilson was employed at the time:

I won't name names here, but I worked at Universal Studios at the time. I was director of development for the director Walter Hill. I had a very good relationship with a very prominent executive at Universal. He liked me, and he liked what I was doing with Walter, and the material I was bringing in.

I gave him Beetlejuice to read, and I gave it to him on a Friday, and on Monday his assistant called me and said "well, he wants to meet with you". My initial reaction was "wow! He'd read it. He must have loved it or he wouldn't have wanted to see me so soon." But I went into his office, and he literally said, "what are you doing with your career?"

"This piece of weirdness, this is what you're going to go out into the world with? You're developing into a very good executive. You've got great taste in material. Why are you going to squander all that for this piece of shit" was basically what he was saying. It goes to show, right? Shortly after that, we sold it to the Geffen Company.

Skaaren's rewrite shifted the film's tone, eliminating the graphic nature of the Maitlands' deaths and eliminated the character of Cathy and merged her central role with that of her older sister Lydia and further developed the concept created by McDowell and Wilson that the Afterlife is a complex bureaucracy. Skaaren's rewrite also added to McDowell and Wilson's depiction of the limbo that keeps Barbara and Adam trapped inside their home; in the original script, it takes the form of a massive void filled with giant clock gears that shred the fabric of time and space as they move. Skaaren had Barbara and Adam encounter different limbos every time they leave their home, including the "clock world" and the sandworm world, identified as Saturn's moon Titan. Skaaren also introduced the leitmotif of music accompanying Barbara and Adam's ghostly hijinks, although his script specified R&B tunes instead of Harry Belafonte and was to have concluded with Lydia dancing to "When a Man Loves a Woman".

Skaaren's first draft retained some of McDowell's Betelgeuse's more sinister characteristics but toned the character down to make him a troublesome pervert rather than blatantly murderous. Betelgeuse's true form was that of the Middle Eastern man, and much of his dialogue was written in African-American Vernacular English. This version concluded with the Deetzes returning to New York and leaving Lydia in the care of the Maitlands, who, with Lydia's help, transform their home's exterior into a stereotypical haunted house while returning the interior to its previous state. It also featured deleted scenes such as the real estate agent, Jane, trying to convince the Deetzes to allow her to sell the house for them (having sold it to them in the first place—Charles and Delia decline) and a revelation of how Betelgeuse had died centuries earlier (he attempted to hang himself while drunk—having been rejected by a woman—only to mess it up and die slowly by choking to death rather than quickly by snapping his neck) and wound up working for Juno before striking out on his own as a "freelance bio-exorcist".

Retrospectively, McDowell was impressed with how many people made the connection between the film's title and the star Betelgeuse.

=== Casting ===
Burton's original choice for Betelgeuse was Sammy Davis Jr. The producers also considered Dudley Moore and Sam Kinison for the role, but Geffen suggested Michael Keaton. Burton was unfamiliar with Keaton's work, but was quickly convinced. Several actresses auditioned for the role of Lydia Deetz, including Sarah Jessica Parker, Brooke Shields, Lori Loughlin, Diane Lane, Justine Bateman, Molly Ringwald, Juliette Lewis, and Jennifer Connelly. Alyssa Milano was the runner-up for the role. Burton cast Winona Ryder upon seeing her in Lucas. Anjelica Huston was originally cast as Delia Deetz but dropped out because of illness. Geffen offered the role to Catherine O'Hara who nearly declined as she couldn't stop thinking about Ned Beatty in the title role, but she then flew from her home in Toronto to Los Angeles to meet with Burton but she went to the wrong Warner Bros. lot and missed him. O'Hara quickly signed on, while Burton claimed it took a lot of time to convince other cast members to sign, as "they didn't know what to think of the weird script". Burton also felt that O'Hara and Jeffrey Jones would make a "cute couple". Lydia Deetz was notably cast with the look and persona of the Goth subculture.

=== Filming ===
Beetlejuice's budget was $15 million, with just $1 million given over to visual effects work. Considering the scale and scope of the effects, which included stop motion, replacement animation, prosthetic makeup, puppetry and blue screen, it was always Burton's intention to make the style similar to that of the B movies he grew up with as a child. He said that he wanted to make the effects look cheap and purposely fake-looking. Burton wanted to hire Anton Furst as production designer after being impressed with his work on The Company of Wolves (1984) and Full Metal Jacket (1987), but Furst was committed to High Spirits, a choice he later regretted. He hired Bo Welch, his future collaborator on Edward Scissorhands and Batman Returns. The test screenings were met with positive feedback and prompted Burton to film an epilogue featuring Betelgeuse foolishly angering a witch doctor. Warner Bros. disliked the title Beetlejuice and wanted to call the film House Ghosts. As a joke, Burton suggested the name Scared Sheetless and was horrified when the studio actually considered using it. While the setting is the fictional village of Winter River, Connecticut, all outdoor scenes were filmed in East Corinth, a village in the town of Corinth, Vermont. Interiors were filmed at The Culver Studios in Culver City, California. Principal photography took place from March 11 to June 11, 1987.

Through his role as the production designer for Beetlejuice, Welch also became acquainted with film actress Catherine O'Hara, who he later married.

=== Music ===
The Beetlejuice soundtrack, first released in 1988 on LP, CD, and cassette tape, features most of the film's score, written and arranged by Danny Elfman. Geffen reissued the original 1988 soundtrack on vinyl in 2015, which was remastered and pressed to vinyl by Waxwork Records in 2019 for the film's 30th anniversary.

== Reception ==
=== Box office ===
Beetlejuice opened theatrically in the United States on March 30, 1988, earning $8,030,897 during its opening weekend, which at the time, was an Easter weekend record. The film eventually grossed $75.1 million worldwide. Beetlejuice was a financial success, recouping its $15 million budget and becoming the 10th-highest-grossing film of 1988.

=== Critical response ===
Beetlejuice was met with a mostly positive response. Based on 115 reviews collected by Rotten Tomatoes, Beetlejuice holds an 83% overall approval rating with an average rating of 7/10. The website's critical consensus reads, "Brilliantly bizarre and overflowing with ideas, Beetlejuice offers some of Michael Keaton's most deliciously manic work—and creepy, funny fun for the whole family." On Metacritic, the film has a weighted average score of 71 out of 100, based on 19 reviews. Audiences surveyed by CinemaScore gave the film a B on a grade scale of A to F.

Pauline Kael called the film a "comedy classic". Jonathan Rosenbaum called it an "appealing mess" in a positive review in the Chicago Reader. Desson Howe of The Washington Post felt Beetlejuice had the "perfect" balance of bizarreness, comedy and horror.

Roger Ebert of the Chicago Sun Times gave the film two out of four stars, writing that he "would have been more interested if the screenplay had preserved their [Alec Baldwin and Geena Davis] sweet romanticism and cut back on the slapstick". Ebert called Keaton "unrecognizable behind pounds of makeup" and said "his scenes don't seem to fit with the other action". On At the Movies, Ebert's colleague, Gene Siskel of the Chicago Tribune, said he could not fault the film's art direction or ambition, but called it "too much of a not very good thing" and said he was annoyed by the overbearing antics of Betelgeuse in the second half of the film. He and Ebert both compared Beetlejuice unfavorably to Ghostbusters and gave the film a "thumbs down." Janet Maslin of The New York Times also gave the film a negative review, writing that the film "tries anything and everything for effect, and only occasionally manages something marginally funny" and "is about as funny as a shrunken head".

In his book Comedy-Horror Films: A Chronological History, 1914–2008, Bruce G. Hallenbeck praised the film's lively script, assured direction, offbeat casting, and "delightfully off-kilter, Edward Gorey-like look", citing the explorer with the shrunken head and the animated sandworm as particularly memorable visuals.

=== Accolades and rankings ===
Beetlejuice was 88th in the American Film Institute's list of 100 Years...100 Laughs.

Year	Organization	Category	Recipient	Result	Ref.
1989	Academy Awards	Best Makeup	Ve Neill, Steve La Porte, Robert Short	Won	
1989	British Academy of Film and Television Arts	Best Makeup	Ve Neill, Steve La Porte, Robert Short	Nominated	
1989	British Academy of Film and Television Arts	Best Special Visual Effects	Peter Kuran, Alan Munro, Robert Short, Ted Rae	Nominated	
1989	Hugo Awards	Best Dramatic Presentation	Beetlejuice	Nominated	
1989	Saturn Awards	Best Horror Film	Beetlejuice	Won	
1989	Saturn Awards	Best Supporting Actor	Michael Keaton	Nominated	
1989	Saturn Awards	Best Supporting Actress	Sylvia Sidney	Won	
1989	Saturn Awards	Best Director	Tim Burton	Nominated	
1989	Saturn Awards	Best Writing	Michael McDowell, Warren Skaaren	Nominated	
1989	Saturn Awards	Best Music	Danny Elfman	Nominated	
1989	Saturn Awards	Best Make-up	Ve Neill, Steve La Porte, Robert Short	Won	
1989	Saturn Awards	Best Special Effects	Peter Kuran, Alan Munro, Ted Rae, Robert Short	Nominated	

=== Home media ===
Beetlejuice was released on VHS on October 19, 1988, by Warner Home Video. It proved successful in the video rental market, becoming the 5th most-rented film in the United States for 1989.

== In other media ==
Beetlejuice has been adapted into various forms of media, including television, theater, video games, comics, theme park attractions, and merchandise.

=== Television ===
A spin-off animated television series, Beetlejuice, aired from 1989 to 1991. Developed by Tim Burton, the series reimagined the relationship between Betelgeuse and Lydia Deetz, portraying them as friends who travel between the real world and the Neitherworld. The show introduced new characters and settings distinct from the film. The series ended on October 26, 1991, on ABC and on December 6, 1991, on Fox.

=== Stage adaptation ===
Beetlejuice the Musical is a stage adaptation featuring music and lyrics by Eddie Perfect. The production premiered at the National Theatre in Washington, D.C., in 2018 before transferring to Broadway in 2019. Following an initial closure due to the COVID-19 pandemic, the musical reopened in 2022 at the Marquis Theatre before concluding its Broadway run in 2023. A U.S. national tour began in December 2022.

=== Sequel ===
A sequel, Beetlejuice Beetlejuice, produced by Brad Pitt's studio Plan B Entertainment alongside Warner Bros., with Keaton, Ryder, and O'Hara reprising their roles, was released on September 6, 2024.

=== Video games ===
Several video games based on Beetlejuice have been released. In 1991, LJN published a platformer for the Nintendo Entertainment System, developed by Rare, in which players control Betelgeuse and use scare-based abilities. A separate Game Boy title, Beetlejuice: Horrific Hijinx from the Neitherworld! (1992), also developed by Rare, was based on the animated series and featured side-scrolling gameplay.

A Beetlejuice-themed fun pack for the toys-to-life video game Lego Dimensions was released in September 2017. The pack includes a Betelgeuse minifigure and constructable Saturn's Sandworm, and adds a Beetlejuice-themed open-world area and battle arena to the game. In the Beetlejuice-themed open-world area, Betelgeuse is voiced by Christopher Swindle, Adam Maitland is voiced by Jeff Shine, Barbara Maitland and Delia Dietz are voiced by Krizia Bajos, and Harry the Head-Shrunken Hunter is voiced by Tom Kane. Betelgeuse also features prominently in an episode of Teen Titans Go! included as part of the game. In the Teen Titans Go! episode, when the Titans travel to the Lego world, Raven summons Betelgeuse by saying his name three times and gets to go to the Beetlejuice world. Betelgeuse says if Raven wants to win the Lego building competition, she should resort to cheating and use magic, but tricks her into making a giant gargoyle that the Titans have to fight.

Beetlejuice is represented in the platform fighter MultiVersus as part of its second season, with Christopher Swindle reprising his role.

A Beetlejuice-themed collab for the Halloween themed season, "Fortnitemares", was announced in September 2026 for Fortnite, the online video game and game platform developed and released by Epic Games, with an in-game skin of the character.

=== Comics and publications ===
DC Comics published a limited comic book series from 1991 to 1992, based on Beetlejuice: The Animated Series. In 2024, DC released a series of Beetlejuice-themed variant covers across several of its publications.

A series of juvenile novels based on the animated television series were published by Aladdin Paperbacks in 1992. The novels were Beetlejuice for President, Lydia's Scream Date, Rock 'n' Roll Nightmare, Twisted Tours, Camp Fright, and Trial by Ghost.

=== Theme park attractions ===
Beetlejuice's Rock and Roll Graveyard Revue was a live stage show featured at Universal Studios theme parks. Debuting in 1992, the show featured Betelgeuse hosting musical performances alongside Universal Monsters. It closed permanently in 2016.

Universal Studios Florida also featured a Beetlejuice themed haunted house for Halloween Horror Nights 30 in 2021.

=== Video rental ===
On March 10, 1998, Beetlejuice became the first of more than 5.2 billion DVDs shipped by Netflix, which launched as a mail-based rental business.

== See also ==
- List of ghost films
- Drop Dead Fred
