= KNB EFX Group =

Special effects company

- Company type: Private
- Industry: Film industry
- Founded: 1988; 37 years ago in Los Angeles, California, US
- Founders: Robert Kurtzman; Greg Nicotero; Howard Berger
- Services: Prosthetic makeup; Animatronics
- Website: www.knbefx.com

KNB EFX Group is an American special effects company that specializes in prosthetic makeup, animatronics, and other practical effects. It was founded in 1988 by Robert Kurtzman, Greg Nicotero, and Howard Berger, though Kurtzman left in 2003. After establishing a reputation for gory effects in horror films throughout the late 1980s and early 1990s, they broadened to performing animatronics and makeup effects for mainstream comedy and drama films. Their work on The Chronicles of Narnia: The Lion, the Witch and the Wardrobe and The Walking Dead have netted them multiple awards and nominations.

== History ==
Founders Robert Kurtzman, Greg Nicotero, and Howard Berger were all working freelance on various Hollywood productions in the mid-1980s. Kurtzman likened the atmosphere to that of local bands who influenced each other. Nicotero and Berger met while performing special makeup effects under Tom Savini on George A. Romero's zombie film Day of the Dead. While Berger did that, Kurtzman was hired to take Berger's place as John Carl Buechler's assistant. Nicotero, Berger, and Kurtzman all worked together on Sam Raimi's Evil Dead II. The three briefly continued working freelance, sometimes on the same films. In 1988, the three formed their own company. The name KNB was chosen to represent the first letter of each founder's last name.

KNB's first film was Intruder, directed by Scott Spiegel, who had written Evil Dead II. After that, they did makeup effects for several direct-to-video films and horror film sequels, including A Nightmare on Elm Street 5: The Dream Child and Halloween 5: The Revenge of Michael Myers. They credited their work with these films, which frequently had a low budget, for developing a reputation in the industry. To work within these budgets, they performed most of the work themselves. Around the same time, Romero recommended KNB to producer Debra Hill for Gross Anatomy, a comedy film about medical students. Romero knew Nicotero had a background as a pre-med student himself. Their work on this film cost them more money than they made but helped further establish their reputation. The realistic-looking cadavers they created got them the attention of Kevin Costner, who hired them to make animatronic buffalo for Dances with Wolves. Nicotero said this helped to break them out of being known only for gory horror films.

Hoping to break into further mainstream films, KNB contacted Rob Reiner when they heard he was adapting Misery. Reiner initially declined their offer, reasoning that he did not need special effects because he was deemphasizing the novel's gore. After pointing out the potential for realistic – but subdued – effects, Reiner hired them. For the 1991 film City Slickers, they made animatronic calves. In the early 1990s, they continued their collaboration with Sam Raimi, working on Army of Darkness, the sequel to Evil Dead II. Among other horror films, they performed effects for Dr. Giggles, which was not well received among genre fans or critics, though its effects were praised.

In the 1990s, a collaboration with Quentin Tarantino began with Reservoir Dogs. Kurtzman had hired Tarantino to write a screenplay from a treatment; this was eventually filmed as From Dusk till Dawn. In return, Kurtzman promised KNB would perform special makeup effects for Reservoir Dogs, which turned into that film's torture scene. Dusk did not get produced until 1996. In the meantime, KNB worked on Pulp Fiction. Following the release of Jurassic Park in 1993, many artists worried that computer-generated imagery might overtake the industry, forcing out practical effects. Berger said that instead of panicking and changing their specialty, KNB decided to "just ride it out". At the same time, there was a slowdown in horror films in the mid-1990s. KNB emphasized to filmmakers their ability to create realistic animatronics, bringing effects that had once been mainstays of B movies to mainstream films, such as prosthetic effects in comedy films.

Throughout the 2000s, they continued their collaboration with Tarantino, working on Kill Bill and other films. Kurtzman left the company in 2003. Berger said Kurtzman wanted to focus on directing and raising his family. KNB performed makeup effects for Land of the Dead, Romero's followup to Day of the Dead. Savini, who was by then working as a director, appeared in a cameo as a zombie at Nicotero's suggestion. In 2006, KNB created animatronics for The Chronicles of Narnia: The Lion, the Witch and the Wardrobe, which was initially going to be completely digital. Their work resulted in an Academy Award for Best Makeup and Hairstyling and BAFTA Award for Best Makeup and Hair. Since 2010, Nicotero has performed special makeup effects for The Walking Dead, which has drawn awards and nominations. In 2011, Nightmare Factory, a documentary about the company, was released.
