= Star Trek: First Contact =

1996 film directed by Jonathan Frakes

- Theatrical release poster
- Directed by: Jonathan Frakes
- Screenplay by: Brannon Braga; Ronald D. Moore
- Story by: Rick Berman; Brannon Braga; Ronald D. Moore
- Based on: Star Trek by Gene Roddenberry
- Produced by: Rick Berman
- Starring: Patrick Stewart; Jonathan Frakes; Brent Spiner; LeVar Burton; Michael Dorn; Gates McFadden; Marina Sirtis; Alfre Woodard; James Cromwell; Alice Krige
- Cinematography: Matthew F. Leonetti
- Edited by: John W. Wheeler
- Music by: Jerry Goldsmith
- Production company: Paramount Pictures
- Distributed by: Paramount Pictures
- Release date: November 22, 1996
- Running time: 111 minutes
- Country: United States
- Language: English
- Budget: $45 million
- Box office: $146 million

Star Trek: First Contact is a 1996 American science fiction film directed by Jonathan Frakes in his feature film debut. It is the eighth movie of the Star Trek franchise, and the second starring the cast of the television series Star Trek: The Next Generation. In the film, the crew of the starship USS Enterprise-E travel back in time from the 24th century to the 21st century to stop the Borg, a cybernetic alien group, from conquering Earth by changing the past.

After the release of Star Trek Generations in 1994, Paramount Pictures tasked writers Brannon Braga and Ronald D. Moore with developing the next film in the series. Braga and Moore wanted to feature the Borg in the plot, while producer Rick Berman wanted a story involving time travel. The writers combined the two ideas; they initially set the film in Renaissance Italy, but changed the time period that the Borg corrupted to the mid-21st century, after fearing the Renaissance idea would feel kitschy. After two better-known directors turned down the job, cast member Jonathan Frakes was chosen to direct to make sure the task fell to someone who understood Star Trek.

The film's script required the creation of new starship designs, including a new USS Enterprise. Production designer Herman Zimmerman and illustrator John Eaves collaborated to make a sleeker ship than its predecessor. Principal photography began with weeks of location shooting in Arizona and California, before production moved to new sets for the ship-based scenes. The Borg were redesigned to appear as though they were converted into machine beings from the inside-out; the new makeup sessions took four times as long as their appearances on the television series. Effects company Industrial Light & Magic rushed to complete the film's special effects in less than five months. Traditional optical effects techniques were supplemented with computer-generated imagery. Jerry Goldsmith composed the film's score.

Star Trek: First Contact was released on November 22, 1996, and was the highest-grossing film on its opening weekend. It grossed a worldwide total of $146 million. Critical reception was mostly positive; critics including Roger Ebert considered it to be one of the best Star Trek films. The Borg and the special effects were lauded, while characterization was less evenly received. Scholarly analysis of the film has focused on Captain Jean-Luc Picard's parallels to Herman Melville's Ahab and the nature of the Borg. First Contact was nominated for the Academy Award for Best Makeup, and won three Saturn Awards. It was followed by Star Trek: Insurrection in 1998.

== Plot ==
In the 24th century, Captain Jean-Luc Picard awakens from a nightmare in which he relives his assimilation by the cybernetic Borg from six years earlier. He is contacted by Starfleet, who inform him of a new Borg threat against Earth. Concerned that Picard is too emotionally involved with the Borg, Starfleet orders the USS Enterprise to patrol the Neutral Zone in case of Romulan aggression.

During their patrol, the Enterprise learns that the fleet is losing the battle against the Borg. Picard and his crew disobey orders and head for Earth, where a single Borg cube ship holds its own against a group of Starfleet vessels. Enterprise arrives in time to assist the crew of the USS Defiant and its captain, Commander Worf. Picard takes command of the fleet and directs the surviving ships to concentrate their firepower on a seemingly unimportant point on the Borg ship. The cube launches a smaller spherical ship towards Earth before being destroyed. Enterprise pursues the sphere into a temporal vortex. As the sphere disappears, Enterprise discovers Earth has been altered—Borg now populate it. Realizing the Borg have used time travel to change the past, Enterprise follows the sphere through the vortex.

Enterprise arrives hundreds of years in the past on April 4, 2063, the day before the historic warp drive flight that leads to humanity's first encounter with alien life. The crew surmise that the Borg are trying to prevent first contact and assimilate humanity while the planet is recovering from World War III. After destroying the Borg sphere, an away team transports down to Zefram Cochrane's warp ship, Phoenix, in Bozeman, Montana. Beverly Crusher and Cochrane's assistant Lily Sloane return to the Enterprise to treat the latter's radiation sickness. Picard and Data also return to the ship after suspecting the Borg have survived their sphere's destruction, leaving Commander William T. Riker on Earth to make sure Phoenix's flight proceeds as planned. While in the future Cochrane is seen as a hero, he actually built the Phoenix for financial gain and is reluctant to be the historic figure the crew describes.

A group of Borg invade Enterprise's lower decks, assimilating some of the crew and modifying the ship. Picard and a team attempt to reach engineering to disable the Borg with a corrosive gas, but are forced back; the android Data is captured in the melee. A frightened Lily corners Picard with a weapon, but he gains her trust. The two escape the Borg-infested area of the ship by creating a diversion in the holodeck. Picard, Worf, and the ship's navigator, Lieutenant Hawk, travel outside the ship in space suits to stop the Borg from using the navigational deflector to call for reinforcements, but Hawk is assimilated in the process. As the Borg assimilate more decks, Worf suggests destroying the ship, but Picard angrily calls him a coward. Lily confronts the captain and makes him realize he is acting irrationally because of his past with the Borg. Picard apologizes to Worf and orders the activation of the ship's self-destruct and evacuation of the crew to escape pods, while he stays behind to rescue Data.

As Cochrane, Riker, and engineer Geordi La Forge prepare to activate the warp drive on Phoenix, Picard discovers that the Borg Queen has grafted human skin onto Data, giving him the sensation of touch he has long desired so that she can obtain the android's encryption codes to the Enterprise computer. Although Picard offers himself to the Borg in exchange for Data's freedom, Data refuses to leave, deactivates the self-destruct, and fires torpedoes at Phoenix. At the last moment, the torpedoes miss, and the Queen discovers that Data has deceived her. The android ruptures a coolant tank, and the corrosive vapor eats away the biological components of the Borg and Data's new skin.

With the Borg threat neutralized, Cochrane completes his warp flight. Later that night, the crew watches from a distance as an alien Vulcan ship, attracted by the Phoenix warp test, lands on Earth. Cochrane greets the aliens. Having ensured the correction of the timeline, Picard bids Lily farewell, and the Enterprise crew slips away and returns to the 24th century.

== Cast ==
First Contact is the first film in the Star Trek film series in which none of the main characters from The Original Series appear. Rather, the main cast of Star Trek: The Next Generation play the following characters:

- Patrick Stewart as Jean-Luc Picard, the captain of the USS Enterprise-E who is haunted by his time as a member of the Borg. Stewart was one of the few cast members who had an important role in developing the script, offering suggestions and comments. Picard's character was changed from the "angst-ridden character [viewers have] seen before", to an action hero type. Stewart noted that Picard was more physically active in the film compared to his usual depiction.
- Jonathan Frakes as William T. Riker, the ship's first officer who leads the away team on Earth. Frakes said he did not have much difficulty directing and acting at the same time, having done so on the television series.
- Brent Spiner as Data, an android and the ship's second officer, whose ambition is to become more human. Rumors before the film's release suggested that since Data's skin had been largely removed at the end of the story, it would allow another actor to assume the role.
- LeVar Burton as Geordi La Forge, the ship's chief engineer who helps repair the Phoenix. La Forge was blind, and had been depicted wearing a special VISOR to see. Burton had lobbied for the VISOR to be discarded, since it hid his eyes and restricted the actor's ability to convey thoughts and emotions. The VISOR was replaced in First Contact by ocular implants, which were shown to be artificial but otherwise unexplained.
- Michael Dorn as Worf, the commander of the USS Defiant and Picard's former chief of security.
- Gates McFadden as Beverly Crusher, the ship's doctor. In an interview before the film's premiere, McFadden said she considered women finally on par with the men in Star Trek: "We've come a long way since Majel Barrett was stuck in the sick bay as Nurse Chapel in the [1960s] and made to dye her hair blond."
- Marina Sirtis as Deanna Troi, counselor aboard the Enterprise. Sirtis missed working on the television show, and was acutely aware that expectations and stakes for First Contact were high; "we were scared that people thought we couldn't cut it without the original cast", she said.
- Alfre Woodard as Lily Sloane, Cochrane's assistant. Woodard was one of the first people Frakes met when he moved to Los Angeles. During a conversation at a barbecue Woodard said she would become Frakes' godmother, as he did not have one. Through this relationship, Frakes was able to cast Woodard in the film; he considered it a coup to land an Academy Award-nominated actress. Woodard considered Lily to be the character most like herself out of all the roles she had played.
- James Cromwell as Zefram Cochrane, the pilot and creator of Earth's first warp-capable vessel. The character of Zefram Cochrane had first appeared in The Original Series episode "Metamorphosis", played by Glenn Corbett. Cromwell's Cochrane is much older and has no resemblance to Corbett, which did not bother the writers. They wanted to portray Cochrane as a character going through a major transition; he starts out as a cynical, selfish drunk who is changed by the characters he meets over the course of the film. Although the character was written with Cromwell in mind, Tom Hanks, a big fan of Star Trek, was floated for the role by Paramount, though producer Rick Berman said it was never a serious consideration. Frakes commented that it would have been a mistake to cast Hanks due to his being so well known. Cromwell had a long previous association with Star Trek, having played characters in The Next Generation episodes "The Hunted" and "Birthright", as well as a role in Star Trek: Deep Space Nine. Cromwell described his method of portraying Cochrane as always playing himself. Part of the actor's interest in the film was his involvement in Steven M. Greer's Center for the Study of Extraterrestrial Intelligence, which offers training for first-contact scenarios.
- Alice Krige as the Borg Queen, the controller of the cybernetic collective. Casting for the part took time as the actress needed to be sexy, dangerous, and mysterious. Frakes cast Krige after finding that she had all of the mentioned qualities, and being impressed by her performance in Ghost Story. Krige suffered a large amount of discomfort filming her role; her tight costume caused blisters, and the painful silver contact lenses she wore could only be kept in for four minutes at a time.

Some of The Next Generation's recurring characters also appeared in the film; Dwight Schultz reprised his role of Lieutenant Reginald Barclay and Patti Yasutake briefly appeared as Nurse Alyssa Ogawa. Whoopi Goldberg was not asked to return as Guinan, a wise bartender whose homeworld was destroyed by the Borg. Goldberg only learned about the decision through the newspapers. "What can I say? I wanted to do it because I didn't think you could do anything about the Borg without [my character]", she said, "but apparently you can, so they don't need me."

Michael Horton appears as a bloodied and stoic Starfleet Security Officer; his character was given the name Lt. Daniels in the next Star Trek film. As with many Star Trek productions, new, disposable "redshirt" characters are killed off over the course of the plot. Neal McDonough plays Hawk, the Enterprise helmsman who aids in the defense of the ship until he is assimilated and killed. McDonough was cavalier about his role as a redshirt, saying that since one of the characters in the deflector dish battle had to die, "that would be me". "Resistance is futile", the Borg's tagline, was spoken by Jeff Coopwood.

The film also features cameos by two actors from the sister television series Star Trek: Voyager, which was in its third season at release. Robert Picardo, who played Voyager's holographic Doctor, was asked to appear as Enterprise's Emergency Medical Hologram after suggesting to producers that the two vessels should share similar technology. Picardo's line "I'm a doctor, not a door stop", is an allusion to the Star Trek original series character Dr. Leonard McCoy. Picardo's fellow Voyager actor Ethan Phillips, who played Neelix, cameos as a nightclub maître d' in the holodeck scene. Phillips recalled that the producers wanted the fans to be left guessing whether he was the person who played Neelix or not, as he did not appear in the credits. During production, there were incorrect rumors that Avery Brooks would reprise his role as Star Trek: Deep Space Nine captain Benjamin Sisko.

== Production ==
=== Development ===
In December 1992, Paramount Pictures executives approached Star Trek: The Next Generation producer Rick Berman to develop two films featuring the cast of the television series. Berman decided to develop two screenplays simultaneously, and prioritize the most promising one for the first film. The effort of writers Brannon Braga and Ronald D. Moore was chosen and developed into Star Trek Generations. The other, by Maurice Hurley, was set aside to use in a possible second movie. Two months after the release of Generations, Paramount decided to produce the second feature for a winter holiday 1996 release. Paramount wanted Braga and Moore, who had written the Generations script and a number of Next Generation episodes, to pen the screenplay. Berman told Braga and Moore that he wanted them to think about doing a story involving time travel. Braga and Moore, meanwhile, wanted to use the Borg. "Right on the spot, we said maybe we can do both, the Borg and time travel," Moore recalled. The Borg had not been seen in full force since the fourth-season episode of The Next Generation, "The Best of Both Worlds" and had never been heavily featured in the series due to budget constraints and the fear that they would lose their scare factor. "The Borg were really liked by the fans, and we liked them," Moore said. "They were fearsome. They were unstoppable. Perfect foils for a feature story."

Having decided that the time travel aspect of the plot would involve a Borg plan to stop humans ever reaching space, the writers considered various historical periods as a setting. "Our goals at that point were to create a story that was wonderful and a script that was [...] producible within the budget confines of a Star Trek film", said Berman. The first story draft, named Star Trek: Renaissance, adopted his concept of a Borg attempt to prevent the emergence of modern European civilization during the Renaissance. In this scenario, the Enterprise crew hunted down the Borg to their hive in a 15th-century Italian castle dungeon, and envisaged sword fights alongside the use of phasers, with Data becoming Leonardo da Vinci's apprentice. Moore was afraid that it "risked becoming campy and over-the-top", while Stewart refused to wear tights. Moreover, informal research suggested that the film's core audience were unenthusiastic about the setting. Braga, meanwhile, wanted to see the "birth of Star Trek", when the Vulcans and humans first met; "that, to me, is what made the time travel story fresh", he said.

With the idea of Star Trek's genesis in mind, the central story became Cochrane's warp drive test and humanity's first contact. Drawing on clues from previous Star Trek episodes, Cochrane was placed in mid-21st-century Montana, where humans recover from a devastating world war. In the first script with this setting, the Borg attack Cochrane's lab, leaving the scientist comatose; Picard assumes Cochrane's place to continue the warp test and restore history. In this draft Picard has a love interest in the local photographer Ruby, while Riker leads the fight against the Borg on the Enterprise. Another draft included John de Lancie's omnipotent character Q. Looking at the early scripts, the trio knew that serious work was needed. "It just didn't make sense [...] that Picard, the one guy who has a history with the Borg, never meets them," Braga recalled. Riker's and Picard's roles were swapped, and the planetside story was shortened and told differently. Braga and Moore focused the new arc on Cochrane himself, making the ideal future of Star Trek come from a flawed man. The idea of Borg fighting among period costumes coalesced into a "Dixon Hill" holographic novel sequence on the holodeck. The second draft, titled Star Trek: Resurrection, was judged complete enough that the production team used it to plan expenses. The film was given a budget of $45 million, "considerably more" than Generations' $35 million price tag; this allowed the production to plan a larger amount of action and special effects.

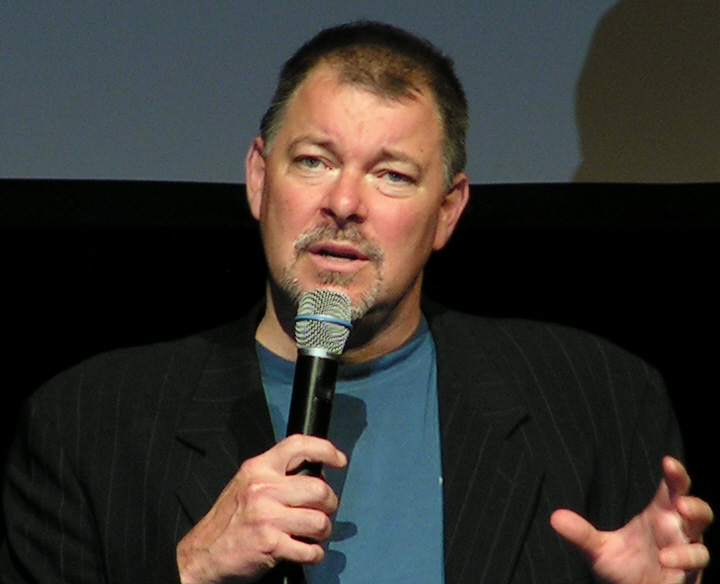
Having directed several episodes of Star Trek: The Next Generation, Jonathan Frakes made his feature film directorial debut with First Contact.

Braga and Moore intended the film to be easily accessible to any moviegoer and work as a stand-alone story, yet still satisfy the devoted Star Trek fans. Since much of Picard's role made a direct reference to his time as a Borg in The Next Generation episodes "The Best of Both Worlds", the opening dream sequence was added to explain what happened to him in the show. The pair discarded an opening which would have established what the main characters had been doing since the last film in favor of quickly setting the story. While the writers tried to preserve the idea of the Borg as a mindless collective in the original draft, Paramount head Jonathan Dolgen felt that the script was not dramatic enough. He suggested adding an individual Borg villain with whom the characters could interact, which led to the creation of the Borg Queen.

Cast member Frakes was chosen to direct. Frakes had not been the first choice for director; Ridley Scott and John McTiernan reportedly turned down the project. Stewart met a potential candidate and concluded that "they didn't know Star Trek". It was decided to stay with someone who understood the "gestalt of Star Trek", and Frakes was given the job. Frakes reported to work every day at 6:30 am. A major concern during the production was security—the script to Generations had been leaked online, and stronger measures were taken to prevent a similar occurrence. Some script pages were distributed on red paper to foil attempted photocopies or faxes; "We had real trouble reading them," Frakes noted.

Frakes had directed multiple episodes of The Next Generation, Deep Space Nine and Voyager, but First Contact was his first feature film. Whereas Frakes had seven days of preparation followed by seven days of shooting for a given television episode, the director was given a ten-week preparation period before twelve weeks of filming, and had to get used to shooting for a 2.35:1 anamorphic ratio instead of the television standard 1.33:1. In preparation, he watched Jaws, Close Encounters of the Third Kind, 2001: A Space Odyssey and the works of James Cameron and Ridley Scott.

Throughout multiple script revisions a number of titles were considered, including Star Trek: Borg, Star Trek: Destinies, Star Trek: Future Generations and Star Trek: Generations II. The planned title of Resurrection was scrapped when 20th Century Fox announced the title of the fourth Alien film as Alien Resurrection; the film was rebranded First Contact on May 3, 1996.

=== Design ===
The new Sovereign-class Enterprise-E was designed to be sleeker than its predecessor. The ship was the last element added to the above scene; the computer-generated nebula background was built first, with the starship composited in later.

First Contact was the first Star Trek film to make significant use of computer-generated starship models, though physical miniatures were still used for the most important vessels. With the Enterprise-D destroyed during the events of Generations, the task of creating a new starship fell to veteran Star Trek production designer Herman Zimmerman. The script's only guide on the appearance of the vessel was the line "the new Enterprise sleekly comes out of the nebula". Working with illustrator John Eaves, the designers conceived the new Sovereign-class Enterprise-E as "leaner, sleeker, and mean enough to answer any Borg threat you can imagine". Braga and Moore intended it to be more muscular and militaryesque. Eaves looked at the structure of previous Enterprise iterations, and designed a more streamlined, capable war vessel than the Enterprise-D, reducing the neck area of the ship and lengthening the nacelles. Eaves produced 30 to 40 sketches before he found a final design he liked and began making minor changes. Working from blueprints created by Paramount's Rick Sternbach, the model shop at effects house Industrial Light & Magic (ILM) fabricated a 10.5-foot (3.2 m) miniature over a five-month period. Hull patterns were carved out of wood, then cast and assembled over an aluminum armature. The model's panels were painted in an alternating matte and gloss scheme to add texture. The crew had multiple difficulties in prepping the miniature for filming; while the model shop originally wanted to save time by casting windows using a clear fiberglass, the material came out tacky. ILM instead cut the windows using a laser. Slides of the sets were added behind the window frames to make the interior seem more dimensional when the camera tracked past the ship.

In previous films, Starfleet's range of capital ships had been predominantly represented by the Constitution-class Enterprise and just five other ship classes: the Miranda class from Star Trek II: The Wrath of Khan, the Excelsior and the Oberth class from Star Trek III: The Search for Spock, and the Galaxy and Nebula classes from The Next Generation. ILM supervisor John Knoll insisted that First Contact's space battle prove the breadth of Starfleet's ship configurations. "Starfleet would probably throw everything it could at the Borg, including ships we've never seen before," he reasoned. "And since we figured a lot of the background action in the space battle would need to be done with computer-generated ships that needed to be built from scratch anyway, I realized there was no reason not to do some new designs." Alex Jaeger was appointed visual effects art director to the film and assigned the task of creating four new starships. Paramount wanted ships that would look different from a distance, so the director devised multiple hull profiles. Knoll and Jaeger had decided that the ships had to obey certain Star Trek ship precedents, with a saucer-like primary hull and elongated warp nacelles in pairs. The Akira class featured the traditional saucer section and nacelles combined with a catamaran-style double hull; the Norway class was based on the USS Voyager; the Saber class was a smaller ship with nacelles trailing off the tips of its saucer section; and the Steamrunner class featured twin nacelles trailing off the saucer and connected by an engineering section in the rear. Each design was modeled as a three-dimensional digital wire-frame model for use in the film.

The film also required a number of smaller non-Starfleet designs. The warp ship Phoenix was conceived as fitting inside an old nuclear missile, meaning that the ship's nacelles had to fold into a space of less than 10 feet (3 m). Eaves made sure to emphasize the mechanical aspect of the ship, to suggest it was a highly experimental and untested technology. The Phoenix's cockpit labels came from McDonnell-Douglas space shuttle manuals. Eaves considered the Vulcan ship a "fun" vessel to design. Only two major Vulcan ships had been previously seen in Star Trek, including a courier vessel from The Motion Picture. Since the two-engine ship format had been seen many times, the artists decided to step away from the traditional ship layout, creating a more artistic than functional design. The ship incorporated elements of a starfish and a crab. Because of budget constraints, the full ship was realized as a computer-generated design. Only a boomerang-shaped landing foot was fabricated for the actors to interact with.

The Enterprise interior sets were mostly new designs. The bridge was designed to be comfortable-looking, with warm colors. Among the new additions was a larger holographic viewscreen that would operate only when activated, leaving a plain wall when disabled. New flatscreen computer monitors were used for displays, using less space and giving the bridge a cleaner look. The new monitors also allowed for video playback that could simulate interaction with the actors. The designers created a larger and less-spartan ready room, retaining elements from the television series; Zimmerman added a set of golden three-dimensional Enterprise models to a glass case in the corner. The observation lounge was similar to the design in the Enterprise-D; the set itself was re-used from the television show, the only such set not to be struck following the filming of Generations, though it was expanded and underwent a color change. Engineering was simulated with a large, three-story set, corridors, a lobby, and the largest warp core in the franchise to date. For its Borg-corrupted state, the engineering section was outfitted with Borg drone alcoves, conduits and Data's "assimilation table" where he is interrogated by the Queen. To save money, the sickbay set from Voyager was redressed to serve as the sickbay of Enterprise, while the USS Defiant scenes were filmed on Deep Space Nine's standing set. Some set designs took inspiration from the Alien film series, Star Wars and 2001: A Space Odyssey.

The spacewalk scene on the Enterprise exterior was one of the most challenging sets to envision and construct for the film. The production had to design a space suit that looked practical rather than exaggerated. Fans were built into the helmets so that the actors would not get overheated, and neon lights built into the front so that the occupant's faces could be seen. When the actors first put the helmets on, the fully enclosed design made it hard to breathe; after a minute of wearing the suit Stewart became ill, and shooting was discontinued. The set for the ship's outer hull and deflector dish were built on gimbals at Paramount's largest sound stage, surrounded by bluescreen and rigged with wires for the zero gravity sequences. The stage was not large enough to accommodate a full-sized replica of the Enterprise dish, so Zimmerman had to scale down the plans by 15 percent.

=== Costumes and makeup ===
The Starfleet uniforms were redesigned for the film by the Star Trek costumer Bob Blackman to give a more militaristic feel, with grey padded shoulders, black torso/sleeves/leggings and colored undershirts/stripe cuffs. Since Blackman was also handling the costumes for the television series, non-Starfleet design clothes were delegated to Deborah Everton, a newcomer to Star Trek who was responsible for more than 800 costumes during production. Everton was tasked with updating the Borg's costumes to something new, but reminiscent of the television series. The bulky suits were made sleeker and outfitted with fiber optic lights. The time-travel aspect of the story also required period costumes for the mid 21st century and the 1940s "Dixon Hill" nightclub holodeck recreation. Everton enjoyed designing Woodard's costumes because the character went through many changes during the course of the film, switching from a utilitarian vest and pants in many shots to a glamorous dress during the holodeck scene.

Everton and makeup designers Michael Westmore, Scott Wheeler, and Jake Garber wanted to upgrade the pasty white look the Borg had retained since The Next Generation's second season, born out of a need for budget-conscious television design. "I wanted it to look like they were [assimilated or "Borgified"] from the inside out rather than the outside in," Everton said. Each Borg had a slightly different design, and Westmore designed a new one each day to make it appear that there was an army of Borg; in reality, between eight and twelve actors filled all the roles as the costumes and makeup were so expensive to produce. Background Borg were simulated by half-finished mannequins. Westmore reasoned that since the Borg had traveled the galaxy, they would have assimilated other races besides humans. In the television series, much of the Borg's faces had been covered by helmets, but for First Contact the makeup artist removed the head coverings and designed assimilated versions of familiar Star Trek aliens such as Klingons, Bolians, Romulans, Bajorans, and Cardassians. Each drone received an electronic eyepiece. The blinking lights in each eye were programmed by Westmore's son to repeat a production member's name in Morse code.

The makeup time for the Borg expanded from the single hour needed for television to five hours, in addition to the 30 minutes necessary to get into costume and 90 minutes to remove the makeup at the end of the day. While Westmore estimated that a fully staffed production would have around 50 makeup artists, First Contact had to make do with fewer than ten people involved in preparation, and at most 20 artists a day. Despite the long hours, Westmore's teams began to be more creative with the prosthetics even as they decreased their preparation times. "They were using two tubes, and then they were using three tubes, and then they were sticking tubes in the ears and up the nose," Westmore explained. "And we were using a very gooey caramel coloring, maybe using a little bit of it, but by the time we got to the end of the movie we had the stuff dripping down the side of [the Borg's] faces—it looked like they were leaking oil! So, at the very end [of the film], they're more ferocious."

The Borg Queen was a challenge because she had to be unique among Borg but still retain human qualities; Westmore was conscious of avoiding comparisons to films like Alien. The final appearance involved pale gray skin and an elongated, oval head, with coils of wire rather than hair. Krige recalled the first day she had her makeup applied: "I saw everyone cringing. I thought, great; they made this, and they've scared themselves!" Frakes noted that the Queen ended up being alluring in a disturbing way, despite her evil behavior and appearance. Zimmerman, Everton and Westmore combined their efforts to design and create the Borgified sections of the Enterprise to build tension and to make the audience feel that "[they are being fed] the Borg".

=== Filming ===
Principal photography was more leisurely than on The Next Generation as only four instead of eight pages of script were filmed each day. Frakes hired a cinematographer new to the Star Trek franchise, Matthew F. Leonetti, whose work on films such as Poltergeist and Strange Days he admired. Being unfamiliar with the Star Trek canon, Leonetti prepared for the assignment by studying the previous four films in the franchise, each of which had used a different cinematographer (Donald Peterman on The Voyage Home, Andrew Laszlo on The Final Frontier, Hiro Narita on The Undiscovered Country, and John Alonzo on Generations). He also spent several days observing filming on the sets of Voyager and Deep Space Nine.

Leonetti devised multiple lighting methods for the Enterprise interiors for ship standard operations, "Red alert" status, and emergency power. He reasoned that since the ship was being taken over by a foreign entity, it required more dramatic lighting and framing. While much of the footage was shot at 50–70 mm focal lengths using anamorphic lenses, 14 mm spherical lenses were used for Borg's-eye-view shots. Leonetti preferred shooting with long lenses to provide a more claustrophobic feel, but made sure the length did not flatten the image. Handheld cameras were used for battle sequences so that viewers were brought into the action and the camera could follow the movements of the actors. The Borg scenes were received positively by test-screening audiences, so once the rest of the film had been completed, additional scenes of the Enterprise crew being assimilated were added with leftover budget to add action.

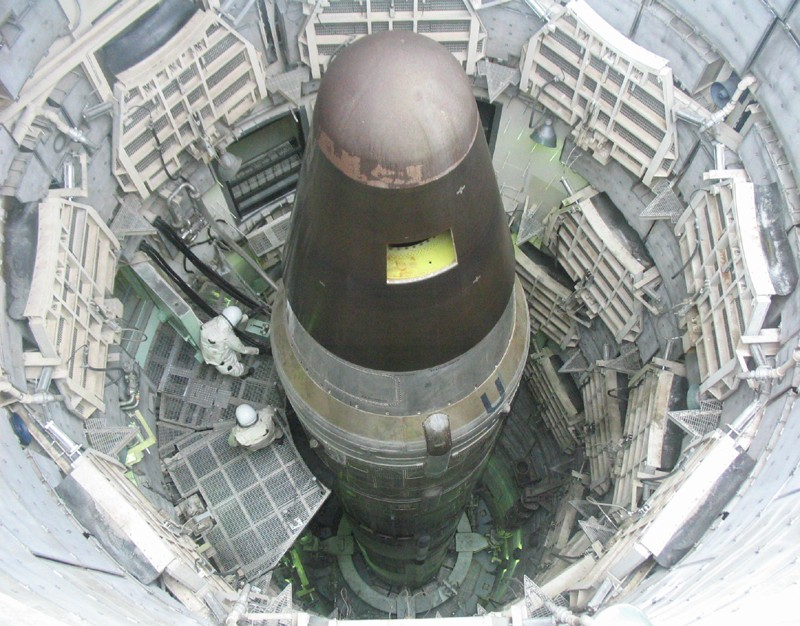
A fiberglass capsule was fitted over this decommissioned missile to convert it into Cochrane's Phoenix.

Since so many new sets were needed, filming began with location photography. Four days were spent in the Titan Missile Museum, south of Tucson, Arizona. The disarmed nuclear missile was fitted with a fiberglass capsule shell to stand in for the Phoenix's booster and command module. The missile silo provided a large set that would have been prohibitively expensive to build from scratch, but the cramped environment created difficulties. Each camera move was planned in advance to work around areas where the lighting would be added, and electricians and grips donned rock-climbing harnesses to move down the shaft and attach the lights. To give greater dimension to the rocket and lend the missile a futuristic appearance, Leonetti chose to offset the missile's metallic surface with complementary colors. Using different-colored gels made the rocket appear longer than it actually was; to complete the effect, shots from the Phoenix's nose downwards and from the engines up were filmed with a 30 mm lens to lengthen the missile.

From Arizona the crew moved to the Angeles National Forest in California for two weeks of nighttime filming. Zimmerman created a village of fourteen huts to stand in for Montana; the cast enjoyed the scenes as a chance to escape their uniforms and wear "normal" clothes. The last location shoot was at an art deco restaurant in Los Angeles' Union Station, which stood in for the Dixon Hill holonovel; Frakes wanted a sharp contrast with the dark, mechanical Borg scenes. While the cinematographer wanted to shoot the scene in black and white, Paramount executives deemed the test footage "too experimental" and the idea was dropped. The site made using high-wattage lights impractical, so Leonetti opted to use dimmer master lights near the ceiling and took advantage of a large window to shine diffused lights through. To give the scene a black-and-white feel, Leonetti made sure to use light without any coloration. "I like creating separation with lighting as opposed to using color," he explained. "You can't always rely on color because the actor might start to melt into the background." By separating the backlights, Leonetti made sure that the principal actors stood out of the backdrop. The shoot used a ten-piece orchestra, 15 stuntmen, and 120 extras to fill the seats. Among the nightclub patrons were Braga, Moore, and the film's stunt coordinator, Ronnie Rondell.

After location shooting was completed, shooting on the new Engineering set began May 3. The set lasted less than a day in its pristine condition before it was "Borgified". Filming then proceeded to the bridge. During normal operation scenes, Leonetti chose to cast crosslighting on the principals; this required the ceiling of the set to be removed and lighting grids to be situated around the sides. These lights were then directed towards the actors' faces at 90-degree angles. The set was lined with window paneling backed by red lights, which would blink intermittently during red-alert status. These lights were supplemented by what Leonetti called "interactive light"; these were off-stage, red-gelled lights that cast flashing rims on the bridge set and heads of the crew. For the Borg intrusion, the lighting originated solely from instrument panels and red-alert displays. The fill light on these scenes was reduced so that the cast would pass through dark spots on the bridge and interiors out of the limited range of these sources. Small 30- and 50-watt lights were used to throw extremely localized shafts of light onto the sets.

Next came the action sequences and the battle for the Enterprise, a phase the filmmakers dubbed "Borg Hell". Frakes directed the Borg scenes similar to a horror film, creating as much suspense as possible. To balance these elements he added more comedic elements to the Earth scenes, intended to momentarily relieve the audience of tension before building it up again. Leonetti reconfigured the lighting to reflect the takeover of the ship interiors. "When the ship gets Borgified, everything is changed into more of a squared-off, robotic look with sharp edges but rounded images," he explained. To give the corridor walls more shape, Leonetti lit them from underneath. Since the halls were so small and the ceilings would be visible in many of the shots, special attention was paid to hiding the light fixtures.

We were on a circle, which has no geography to it. We had our three heroes [Picard, Worf and Hawk] in space suits, which look identical so you couldn't tell who was who until you got in real close. But the minute you get in close, you defeat the whole purpose of being on the outside of the ship, so you can see the cells and the stars and Earth looming in the background. It was a shooting and editing nightmare.

— Jonathan Frakes on the difficulty of the spacewalk scene.

For the live-action spacewalk scenes, visual-effects supervisor Ronald B. Moore spent two weeks of bluescreen photography at the deflector set. Frakes regarded filming the scene to be the most tedious in the film because of the amount of preparation it took for each day's shoot. Since the rest of the Enterprise-E, as well as the backdrop of Earth, were to be added later in post-production, it became confusing to coordinate shots. Moore used a laptop with digital reproductions of the set to orient the crew and help Frakes understand what the finished shot would look like. A one-armed actor portrayed the Borg whose arm Worf slices off to accurately portray the effect intended, and the actors' shoes were fitted with lead weights to remind the actors they were to move slowly as if actually wearing gravity boots. McDonough recalled that he joined Stewart and Dorn in asking whether they could do the shots without the 10-to-15-pound (4.5 to 6.8 kg) weights, as "they hired us because we are actors", but the production insisted on using them.

The last scene filmed was the film's first, Picard's Borg nightmare. The shot begins inside the iris of Picard's eyeball and pulls back first to reveal the captain aboard a massive Borg ship, and then the exterior of the ship. The scene was inspired by a New York City production of Sweeney Todd: the Demon Barber of Fleet Street in which the stage surrounded the audience, giving a sense of realism. The shot was filmed as three separate elements merged with digital effects. The crew used a 50 mm lens to make it easier for the effects team to dissolve the closeup shots with the other elements. Starting from Stewart's eye, the camera pulled back 25 feet (7.6 m), requiring the key light to increase in intensity up to 1,000 foot-candles so that there was enough depth to keep the eye sharp. The surface of the stage proved too uneven to accomplish the smooth dolly pullback required by the effects team, who needed a steady shot to blend a computer-generated version of Picard's eye with the pullback. The 135-foot (41 m) dolly track was raised off the stage floor and layered with pieces of double-thick birch plywood, chosen for its smooth finish. The entire set for the scene was 100 feet (30 m) wide and 25 feet (7.6 m) high; gaps left by the dolly reveal were filled in later digitally. Principal photography finished on July 2, 1996, two days over schedule but still under budget.

=== Effects ===
The majority of First Contact's effects were handled by Industrial Light & Magic under the supervision of John Knoll; more than a quarter of the film's budget went to effects. Smaller effects sequences, such as phaser fire, computer graphics, and transporter effects, were delegated to a team led by visual-effects supervisor David Takemura. Accustomed to directing episodes for the television series, Frakes was frequently reminded by effects artist Terry Frazee to "think big, blow everything up". Most of the effects sequences were planned using low-resolution computer-generated animatics. These rough animated storyboards established length, action and composition, allowing the producers and director to ascertain how the sequences would play out before they were shot.

First Contact was the last film to feature a physical model of the Enterprise. For the ship's dramatic introduction, the effects team combined motion control shots of the Enterprise model with a computer-generated background. Sequence supervisor Dennis Turner, who had created Generations' energy ribbon and specialized in creating natural phenomena, was charged with creating the star cluster, modeled after the Eagle Nebula. The nebular columns and solid areas were modeled with basic wireframe geometry, with surface shaders applied to make the edges of the nebula glow. A particle render that ILM had devised for the earlier tornado film Twister was used to create a turbulent look within the nebula. Once the shots of the Enterprise had been captured, Turner inserted the ship into the computer-generated background and altered its position until the images matched up.

The opening beauty pass of the new Enterprise was the responsibility of visual-effects cinematographer Marty Rosenberg, who handled all the other miniatures, explosions, and some live-action bluescreen elements. Rosenberg had previously shot some of the Enterprise-D effects for Generations, but had to adjust his techniques for the new model; the cinematographer used a 50 mm lens instead of the 35 mm used for Generations because the smaller lens made the new Enterprise's dish appear stretched out. Knoll decided to shoot the model from above and below as much as possible; side views made the ship appear too flat and elongated. Rosenberg preferred motion-control passes of ships over computer-generated versions, as it was much easier to capture a high level of detail with physical models rather than trying to recreate it by computer graphics.

For the Borg battle, Knoll insisted on closeup shots that were near the alien vessel, necessitating a physical model. ILM layered their 30-inch (76 cm) model with an additional five inches of etched brass over a glowing neon lightbox for internal illumination. To make the Borg vessel appear even larger than it was, Knoll made sure that an edge of it was facing the camera like the prow of a ship and that the Cube broke the edges of the frame. To give the Cube greater depth and texture, Rosenberg shot the vessel with harsher light. "I created this really odd, raking three-quarter backlight coming from the right or left side, which I balanced out with nets and a couple of little lights. I wanted it to look scary and mysterious, so it was lit like a point, and we always had the camera dutched to it; we never just had it coming straight at us," he said. Small lights attached to the Cube's surface helped to create visual interest and convey scale; the model was deliberately shot with a slow, determined pacing to contrast with the Federation ships engaged in battle with the Borg. The impact of Federation weaponry on the Borg Cube was simulated using a 60-inch (150 cm) model of the Cube. The model had specific areas which could be blown up multiple times without damaging the miniature. For the final explosion of the Cube, Rosenberg shot ten 30-inch (76 cm) Cube miniatures with explosive-packed lightweight skins. The Cubes were suspended from pipes sixty feet above the camera on the ground. Safety glass was placed over the lens to prevent damage, while the camera was covered with plywood to protect it from bits of plastic that rained down after each explosion. The smaller Borg sphere was a 12-inch (30 cm) model that was shot separately from the Cube and digitally added in post-production. The time-travel vortex the Sphere creates was simulated with a rocket re-entry effect; bowshock forms in front of the ship, then streams backwards at high speed. Interactive lighting was played across the computer-generated Enterprise model for when the ship is caught in the time vortex.

The miniature Enterprise was again used for the spacewalk sequence. Even on the large model, it was hard to make the miniature appear realistic in extreme close-up shots. To make the pullback shot work, the camera had to be within one eighth of an inch from the model. Painter Kim Smith spent several days on a tiny area of the model to add enough surface detail for the close-up, but even then the focus was barely adequate. To compensate, the crew used a wider-angle lens and shot at the highest f-stop they could. The live-action scenes of the spacewalking crew were then digitally added. Wide shots used footage of photo doubles walking across a large bluescreen draped across ILM's parking lot at night.

ILM was tasked with imagining what the immediate assimilation of an Enterprise crewmember would look like. Jaeger came up with a set of cables that sprang from the Borg's knuckles and buried themselves in the crewmember's neck. Wormlike tubes would course through the victim's body and mechanical devices break the skin. The entire transformation was created using computer-generated imagery. The wormlike geometry was animated over the actor's face, then blended in with the addition of a skin texture over the animation. The gradual change in skin tone was simulated with shaders.

The lowering of the Borg Queen's head into her body took ILM five months to produce.

Frakes considered the entrance of the Borg Queen—when her head, shoulders, and steel spine are lowered by cables and attached to her body—as the "signature visual effect in the film". The scene was difficult to execute, taking ILM five months to finish. Jaeger devised a rig that would lower the actress on the set, and applied a prosthetic spine over a blue suit so that ILM could remove Krige's lower body. This strategy enabled the filmmakers to incorporate as many live-action elements as possible without resorting to further digital effects. To make the prosthetics appear at the proper angle when her lower body was removed, Krige extended her neck forward so it appeared in line with the spine. Knoll did not want it to seem that the Queen was on a hard, mechanical rig; "we wanted her to have the appropriate 'float'," he explained. Using separate motion control passes on the set, Knoll shot the lower of the upper torso and the secondary sequence with Krige's entire body. A digital version of the Borg body suit was used for the lowering sequence, at which point the image was morphed back to the real shot of Krige's body. The animated claws of the suit were created digitally as well using a detailed model. As reference to the animators, the shot required Krige to realistically portray "the strange pain or satisfaction of being reconnected to her body".

=== Music ===
Jerry Goldsmith scored First Contact, his third Star Trek feature. He wrote a sweeping main title which begins with Alexander Courage's Star Trek fanfare. Instead of composing a menacing theme to underscore the Borg, Goldsmith wrote a pastoral theme linked to humanity's hopeful first contact. The theme uses a four-note motif used in Goldsmith's Star Trek V: The Final Frontier score, which is used in First Contact as a friendship theme and general thematic link. A menacing march with touches of synthesizers was used to represent the Borg. In addition to composing new music, Goldsmith used music from his previous Star Trek scores, including his theme from The Motion Picture. The Klingon theme from the same film is used to represent Worf.

Because of delays with Paramount's The Ghost and the Darkness, the already-short four-week production schedule was cut to just three weeks. While Berman was concerned about the move, Goldsmith hired his son, Joel, to assist. The young composer provided additional music for the film, writing three cues based on his father's motifs and a total of 22 minutes of music. Joel used variations of his father's Borg music and the Klingon theme as Worf fights hand-to-hand. When the Borg invade sickbay and the medical hologram distracts them, Joel wrote what critic Jeff Bond termed "almost Coplandesque" material of tuning strings and clarinet, but the cue was unused. While Joel composed many of the film's action cues, his father contributed to the spacewalk and Phoenix flight sequences. During the fight on the deflector dish, Goldsmith used low-register electronics punctuated by stabs of violent, dissonant strings.

In a break with Star Trek film tradition, the soundtrack incorporated two licensed songs: Roy Orbison's "Ooby Dooby" and Steppenwolf's "Magic Carpet Ride". GNP Crescendo president Neil Norman explained that the decision to include the tracks was controversial, but said that "Frakes did the most amazing job of integrating those songs into the story that we had to use them".

GNP released the First Contact soundtrack on December 2, 1996. The album contained 51 minutes of music, with 35 minutes of Jerry Goldsmith's score, 10 minutes of additional music by Joel Goldsmith, "Ooby Dooby" and "Magic Carpet Ride". The compact disc shipped with CD-ROM features only accessible if played on a personal computer, including interviews with Berman, Frakes, and Goldsmith.

On April 2, 2012, GNP Crescendo Records announced a limited-edition collector's CD featuring the complete score by Jerry Goldsmith (with additional music by Joel Goldsmith), newly remastered by recording engineer Bruce Botnick, with an accompanying 16-page booklet including informative notes by Jeff Bond and John Takis. The expanded album [GNPD 8079] runs 79 minutes and includes three tracks of alternates.

== Themes ==
Frakes believes that the main themes of First Contact—and Star Trek as a whole—are loyalty, friendship, honesty, and mutual respect. This is evident in the film when Picard chooses to rescue Data rather than evacuate the ship with the rest of the crew. The film makes an explicit comparison between Picard's hatred of the Borg and refusal to destroy the Enterprise and that of Captain Ahab in Herman Melville's novel Moby-Dick. The moment marks a turning point in the film as Picard changes his mind, symbolized by his putting down his phaser. A similar Moby-Dick reference was made in Star Trek II: The Wrath of Khan and although Braga and Moore did not want to repeat it, they decided it worked so well they could not leave it out.

In First Contact, the individually inscrutable and faceless Borg fulfil the role of the similarly unreadable whale in Melville's work. Picard, like Ahab, has been hurt by his nemesis, and author Elizabeth Hinds said it makes sense that Picard should "opt for the perverse alternative of remaining on board ship to fight" the Borg rather than take the only sensible option left to destroy the ship. Several lines in the film refer to the 21st-century dwellers being primitive, with the people of the 24th century having evolved to a more utopian society. In the end, it is Lily (the 21st-century woman) who shows Picard (the 24th-century man) that his quest for revenge is the primitive behavior that humans had evolved to not use. Lily's words cause Picard to reconsider, and he quotes Ahab's words of vengeance, recognizing the death wish embedded therein.

The nature of the Borg in First Contact has been the subject of critical discussion. Artist and writer Julie Clarke notes that while other alien species are tolerated by humanity in Star Trek, the Borg are viewed differently because of their cybernetic alterations and the loss of freedom and autonomy. Members of the crew who are assimilated into the Collective are subsequently viewed as "polluted by technology" and less than human. Clarke draws comparisons between the technological distinction of humanity and machine in Star Trek and the work of artists such as Stelarc. Oliver Marchart drew parallels between the Borg's combination of many into an artificial One and Thomas Hobbes's concept of the Leviathan. The nature of perilous first contact between species, as represented by films such as Independence Day, Aliens and First Contact, is a marriage of classic fears of national invasion and the loss of personal identity.

== Release ==
The year 1996 marked the 30th anniversary of the Star Trek franchise. It was on rocky ground; Deep Space Nine and Voyager had shed millions of viewers, being bested by Hercules: The Legendary Journeys as the highest-rated syndicated series. Some fans remained upset that Paramount cancelled The Next Generation at the height of its popularity, and Generations had been a commercial but not critical success. Frakes noted it was a "pivotal time", as he feared the franchise might have "spread [itself] too thin with two shows".

First Contact was heavily marketed, to an extent not seen since the release of Star Trek: The Motion Picture in 1979. Several novelizations of the film were written for different age groups. Playmates Toys produced six-inch (150 mm) and nine-inch (230 mm) action figures in addition to ship models and a phaser. Two "making of" television specials premiered on HBO and the Sci-Fi Channel, as well as being promoted during a 30th-anniversary television special on UPN. The theatrical trailer to the film was included on a Best of Star Trek music compilation, released at the same time as the First Contact soundtrack. Simon & Schuster Interactive developed a Borg-themed video game for Macintosh and Windows personal computers. The game, Star Trek: Borg, functioned as an interactive movie with scenes filmed at the same time as First Contact's production. A video game adaptation of the film was also announced by Spectrum HoloByte, and would have taken the form of a real-time strategy game set entirely on the Enterprise during the Borg takeover, though it was never released. The film was heavily promoted on the internet through an official website, where users could interact with each other and do battle with the Borg whilst taking a 3-D tour of the Enterprise. The site experienced more traffic than that of any previous motion picture, receiving 4.4 million hits a week during the film's opening run.

The film premiered on November 18, 1996, at Mann's Chinese Theatre in Hollywood, Los Angeles, with $70,000 (equivalent to about $144,000 in 2025) being raised in ticket sales for Amnesty International. The main cast save Spiner were in attendance, as were Moore, Braga, Jerry Goldsmith, and producer Marty Hornstein, alongside other Star Trek actors. After the screening, guests crossed the street to the Hollywood Colonnade, where the interiors had been dressed to match settings from the film. The film received a royal premiere in the United Kingdom, where Marina Sirtis accompanied Prince Charles to the December 10 screening at the Empire, Leicester Square.

=== Box office ===
First Contact opened in 2,812 theaters beginning November 22, grossing $30.7 million its first week and making it the top movie at the US box office. The film was knocked out of the top place the following week by 101 Dalmatians, earning $25.5 million. The film went on to gross $77 million in its first four weeks, remaining in the top-ten box office during that time. It closed with a US and Canadian gross of $92,027,888 and an international gross of $54 million for a total of $146 million worldwide.

The film opened in the United Kingdom on December 13, 1996, becoming number two at the box office. Despite being the first movie in the franchise not to reach number one since The Wrath of Khan, its takings of £8.7 million were the highest until the Star Trek reboot film was released in 2009. The film was the best-performing Star Trek film in international markets until 2009's Star Trek film, and Paramount's best showing in markets such as New Zealand, making $315,491 from 28 sites by year's end.

== Reception ==
First Contact garnered positive reviews on release. Review aggregator Rotten Tomatoes reported an approval rating of 87% based on 164 reviews, with an average rating of 7.50/10. Audiences surveyed by CinemaScore gave the film a grade "A−" on scale of A to F.

Ryan Gilbey of The Independent considered the film wise to dispense with the cast of The Original Series: "For the first time, a Star Trek movie actually looks like something more ambitious than an extended TV show," he wrote. Conversely, critic Bob Thompson felt that First Contact was more in the spirit of the 1960s television series than any previous installment. The Globe and Mail's Elizabeth Renzeti said that First Contact succeeded in improving on the "stilted" previous entry in the series, and that it featured a renewed interest in storytelling. Kenneth Turan of the Los Angeles Times wrote, "First Contact does everything you'd want a Star Trek film to do, and it does it with cheerfulness and style." Adrian Martin of The Age noted that the film was geared towards pleasing fans: "Strangers to this fanciful world first delineated by Gene Roddenberry will just have to struggle to comprehend as best they can," he wrote, but "cult-followers will be in heaven". The New York Times' Janet Maslin thought that the film's "convoluted" plot would "boggle all but hard-core devotees" of the series, while Variety's Joe Leydon wrote that the film did not require intimate knowledge of the series and that fans and non-fans alike would enjoy the film. While Renzetti considered the lack of old characters from the previous seven movies a welcome change, Maslin said that "The series now lacks all of its original stars and much of its earlier determination. It has morphed into something less innocent and more derivative than it used to be, something the noncultist is ever less likely to enjoy." Conversely, Roger Ebert called First Contact one of the best Star Trek films, and James Berardinelli found the film the most entertaining Star Trek feature in a decade; "It has single-handedly revived the Star Trek movie series, at least from a creative point of view," he wrote. In The Times, Frakes was praised as a director by Geoff Brown for "steering through a tangled script without losing momentum".

The film's acting met with mixed reception. Lisa Schwarzbaum of Entertainment Weekly appreciated that guest stars Woodard and Cromwell were used in "inventive contrast" to their better-known images, as a "serious dramatic actress" and "dancing farmer in Babe", respectively. Lloyd Rose of The Washington Post felt that while Woodard and Cromwell managed to "take care of themselves", Frakes' direction of other actors was not inspired; Steve Persall of the St. Petersburg Times opined that only Cromwell received a choice role in the film, "so he steals the show by default". A couple of reviews noted that Data's interactions with the Borg Queen were among the most interesting parts of the film; critic John Griffin credited Spiner's work as providing "ambivalent frisson" to the feature. Empire magazine's Adam Smith wrote that some characters, particularly Troi and Crusher, were lost or ignored, and that the rapid pacing of the film left no time for those unfamiliar with the series to know or care about the characters. Likewise, Emily Carlisle of the BBC praised Woodard's, Spiner's, and Stewart's performances, but felt the film focused more on action than characterization. Stewart, whom Thompson and Renzetti considered overshadowed by William Shatner in the previous film, received praise from Richard Corliss of Time: "As Patrick Stewart delivers [a] line with a majestic ferocity worthy of a Royal Shakespeare Company alumnus, the audience gapes in awe at a special effect more imposing than any ILM digital doodle. Here is real acting! In a Star Trek film!"

The special effects were generally praised. Jay Carr of The Boston Globe said that First Contact successfully updated Star Trek creator Gene Roddenberry's concept with more elaborate effects and action. Thompson's assessment mirrored Carr's; he agreed that the film managed to convey much of the original 1960s television show, and contained enough "special effects wonders and interstellar gunplay" to sate all types of viewers. Ebert wrote that while previous films had often looked "clunky" in the effects department, First Contact benefited from the latest in effects technology. A dissenting opinion was offered by Scott, who wrote that aside from the key effects sequences, Frakes "aims to distract Trekkers from the distinctly cheap-looking remainder".

Critics reacted favorably to the Borg, describing them as akin to creatures from Hellraiser. Renzetti credited them with breathing "new life" into the crew of the Enterprise while simultaneously trying to kill them. The Borg Queen received special attention for her combination of horror and seduction, Ebert writing that while she looked "like no notion of sexy I have ever heard of", he was inspired "to keep an open mind". Carr said, "She proves that women with filmy blue skin, lots of external tubing and bad teeth can be sleekly seductive."

In 2021, First Contact was rated the second best film in Star Trek franchise (after The Undiscovered Country) by Scott Mendelson, who writing for Forbes magazine, described it as "probably the biggest Star Trek movie that still feels like a Star Trek movie". It was also ranked second (after The Wrath of Khan) for Empire magazine in 2022 by Owen Williams, who called the film "one of Trek's nailed-on classics".

=== Accolades ===
| Award | Date of ceremony | Category | Recipient | Results | Ref. |
|---|---|---|---|---|---|
| 20/20 Awards | | Best Makeup | Michael Westmore; Scott Wheeler; Jake Garber | Nominated | |
| Academy Awards | March 24, 1997 | Best Makeup | Michael Westmore; Scott Wheeler; Jake Garber | Nominated | |
| Award Circuit Community Awards | | Best Visual Effects | —N/a | Nominated | |
| Blockbuster Entertainment Awards | March 11, 1997 | Favorite Actor – Science Fiction | Patrick Stewart | Nominated | |
| Blockbuster Entertainment Awards | March 11, 1997 | Favorite Supporting Actor – Science Fiction | Jonathan Frakes | Nominated | |
| BMI Film & TV Awards | | BMI Film Music Award | Jerry Goldsmith | Won | |
| Hugo Awards | | Best Dramatic Presentation | Jonathan Frakes; Brannon Braga; Ronald D. Moore; Rick Berman | Nominated | |
| NAACP Image Awards | February 8, 1997 | Outstanding Supporting Actress in a Motion Picture | Alfre Woodard | Nominated | |
| Online Film & Television Association Awards | | Best Sci-Fi/Fantasy Horror Picture | Rick Berman | Won | |
| Online Film & Television Association Awards | | Best Sci-Fi/Fantasy Horror Actor | Brent Spiner | Nominated | |
| Online Film & Television Association Awards | | Best Sci-Fi/Fantasy Horror Actor | Patrick Stewart | Won | |
| Online Film & Television Association Awards | | Best Sci-Fi/Fantasy Horror Actress | Alice Krige | Won | |
| Online Film & Television Association Awards | | Best Sci-Fi/Fantasy Horror Actress | Alfre Woodard | Nominated | |
| Online Film & Television Association Awards | | Best Production Design | Herman Zimmerman & John M. Dwyer | Nominated | |
| Online Film & Television Association Awards | | Best Makeup | Michael Westmore; Scott Wheeler; Jake Garber | Won | |
| Online Film & Television Association Awards | | Best Sound | Steve Maslow; Gregg Landaker; Kevin O'Connell; Geoffrey Patterson | Nominated | |
| Online Film & Television Association Awards | | Best Sound Effects | Cameron Frankley & James Wolvington | Nominated | |
| Online Film & Television Association Awards | | Best Visual Effects | John Knoll; Adam Howard; George Murphy; Scott Rader | Nominated | |
| Satellite Awards | January 15, 1997 | Best Visual Effects | John Knoll | Nominated | |
| Saturn Awards | July 23, 1997 | Best Science Fiction Film | —N/a | Nominated | |
| Saturn Awards | July 23, 1997 | Best Director | Jonathan Frakes | Nominated | |
| Saturn Awards | July 23, 1997 | Best Writer | Jonathan Frakes | Nominated | |
| Saturn Awards | July 23, 1997 | Best Actor | Patrick Stewart | Nominated | |
| Saturn Awards | July 23, 1997 | Best Supporting Actor | Brent Spiner | Won | |
| Saturn Awards | July 23, 1997 | Best Supporting Actress | Alice Krige | Won | |
| Saturn Awards | July 23, 1997 | Best Costumes | Deborah Everton | Won | |
| Saturn Awards | July 23, 1997 | Best Music | Jerry Goldsmith | Nominated | |
| Saturn Awards | July 23, 1997 | Best Make-up | Michael Westmore; Scott Wheeler; Jake Garber | Nominated | |
| Saturn Awards | July 23, 1997 | Best Special Effects | John Knoll | Nominated | |

== Home media ==
Star Trek: First Contact was first released on VHS in late 1997 as one of several titles expected to boost sluggish sales at video retailers. A LaserDisc version was also released. First Contact was among the first titles announced for the DVD-alternative rental system Digital Video Express in 1998. It was launched with five other test titles in the select markets of Richmond and San Francisco.

When Paramount announced its first slate of DVD releases in August 1998, First Contact was one of the first ten titles released in October, announced in a conscious effort to showcase effects-driven films. This version contained the feature and two trailers, but no other special features. The film was presented in its original 2.35:1 anamorphic aspect ratio, with a surround sound Dolby Digital 5.1 audio mix.

A First Contact "Special Collector's Edition" two-disc set was released in 2005 at the same time as three other Next Generation films and Star Trek: Enterprise's fourth season, marking the first time that every film and episode of the franchise was available on home video up to that point. In addition to the feature, presented with the same technical specifications as the previous release and a new DTS soundtrack, the first disc contains a director's commentary by Frakes and a track by Moore and Braga. As with other special-edition DVD releases, the disc includes a text track by Michael and Denise Okuda that provides production trivia and relevant facts about the Star Trek universe. The second disc contains six making-of featurettes, storyboards, and trailers.

A high-definition Blu-ray of First Contact was released on September 22, 2009. In addition to the returning DVD extras, the Blu-ray contains additional featurettes and a new commentary by Star Trek (2009) co-producer Damon Lindelof and TrekMovie.com contributor Anthony Pascale. The four Next Generation feature films were released on Ultra HD Blu-ray on April 4, 2023, in standalone and collected formats.

== Bibliography ==
- Bond, Jeff (1999). The Music of Star Trek: Profiles in Style. Lone Eagle Publishing Company. ISBN 1580650120 – via Internet Archive.
- Braga, Brannon & Moore, Ronald D. (2005). "Audio Commentary by Screenplay Writers Brannon Braga and Ronald D. Moore". Star Trek: First Contact (Special Edition) (DVD, disc 1). Paramount Pictures.
- Eaves, John (2005). "The Art of First Contact". Star Trek: First Contact (Special Edition) (DVD, disc 2). Paramount Pictures.
- Fordham, Joe (2022). Star Trek: First Contact: The Making of the Classic Film. Titan Books. ISBN 9781789098556.
- Frakes, Jonathan (2005). "Audio Commentary by Director and Actor Jonathan Frakes". Star Trek: First Contact (Special Edition) (DVD, disc 1). Paramount Pictures.
- Kaplan, Anna (December 1996). "The Next Generation Goes Solo – Star Trek: First Contact". Cinefantastique. Vol. 28, no. 6. pp. 16–31 – via Internet Archive.
- Magid, Ron (December 1996). "Where No Trek Has Gone Before". American Cinematographer. Vol. 77, no. 12. pp. 68–74. ISSN 0002-7928.
- Nemecek, Larry (2003). "Star Trek: First Contact". Star Trek: The Next Generation Companion (3rd ed.). Pocket Books. pp. 322–333. ISBN 0743457986.
- Okuda, Michael & Okuda, Denise (2005). "Text commentary by Michael Okuda and Denise Okuda". Star Trek: First Contact (Special Edition) (DVD, disc 1). Paramount Pictures.
- Thompson, Andrew O. (December 1996). "Battling the Borg". American Cinematographer. Vol. 77, no. 12. pp. 58–66. ISSN 0002-7928 – via Internet Archive.
