= Zefram Cochrane =

Fictional character from the Star Trek universe

- Star Trek character
- Glenn Corbett as Zefram Cochrane with Elinor Donahue as Nancy Hedford in the 1967; Star Trek episode "Metamorphosis"
- First appearance: "Metamorphosis" (Star Trek: The Original Series)
- Portrayed by: Glenn Corbett (1967); James Cromwell (1996)

In-universe information
- Species: Human
- Significant other: Nancy Hedford
- Origin: Earth

Zefram Cochrane is a fictional character in the Star Trek universe. Created by writer Gene L. Coon, the character first appeared in the 1967 Star Trek episode "Metamorphosis", in which he was played by Glenn Corbett. James Cromwell later played Cochrane in the 1996 feature film Star Trek: First Contact, the 2001 Star Trek: Enterprise pilot, "Broken Bow", and the 2022 Star Trek: Lower Decks Season 3 premiere episode, "Grounded". Footage of Cromwell from Star Trek: First Contact was used in the Enterprise episode "In a Mirror, Darkly Part I".

As first mentioned in Star Trek: The Original Series, and further established by the events of Star Trek: First Contact, Cochrane is the first human to create a warp drive system, and in 2063, his successful warp speed flight draws the attention of the Vulcans, leading to humanity's first official contact with an alien race.

== Fictional character biography ==
Cochrane was born in 2030, according to Star Trek: First Contact (though the novelization of that film gives his year of birth as 2013). He constructed humanity's first warp-capable vessel, the Phoenix, in Bozeman, Montana, out of an old Titan II nuclear missile. He started the project for financial gain, and found the accounts of his future accolades as told by the crew of the Enterprise-E from the future disturbing and embarrassing.

On April 5, 2063, Cochrane made Earth's first warp flight. The Phoenix's warp flight was detected by a Vulcan survey ship, the T'Plana Hath, which then made peaceful first contact with humans, including Cochrane, at the Phoenix's launch site.

The aphorism "Don't try to be a great man, just be a man. And let history make its own judgments," is attributed to Cochrane, who is said to have uttered it in 2073. In 2119, Cochrane was present at the dedication of Earth's first Warp 5 Complex, as seen in a video viewed by the characters in the 2001 pilot episode of Star Trek: Enterprise. On that occasion, Cochrane stated, "This engine will let us go boldly where no man has gone before", making him the earliest known person in the fictional timeline of Trek to say that phrase.

The Phoenix's launch facility became a historical monument. A 20-meter marble statue was erected there, depicting Cochrane heroically reaching toward the future. Cochrane's name became revered among humans, with entire universities, cities and planets named after him. Enterprise-D and Enterprise-E Chief Engineer Geordi La Forge, for example, attended Zefram Cochrane High School.

According to the original Star Trek episode "Metamorphosis", Cochrane was presumed dead after disappearing from Alpha Centauri in 2117 (though the Star Trek: Enterprise episode "Broken Bow" later retcons the year of Cochrane's disappearance to be 2119 or later). James T. Kirk, Spock and Leonard McCoy find Cochrane living on an asteroid with a being he calls the Companion, an ethereal presence of pure energy who rejuvenated the aged, dying Cochrane 150 years earlier, and has held him captive— and in a state of youth and vigor— ever since. Nancy Hedford, who was traveling with the three Starfleet officers, is an ill Federation commissioner. The Companion, who loves Cochrane, merges with the commissioner, ridding her of her illness and providing the Companion with a corporeal (but now mortal) form. The combined entity no longer has the power to force Cochrane to stay with her, but Cochrane chooses to stay out of love and gratitude. Before departing, Kirk, Spock, and McCoy promise not to reveal Cochrane's existence.

=== Mirror Universe ===
In the Mirror Universe, rather than reciprocating the Vulcans' peaceful greeting, Cochrane and the other humans kill the Vulcans and loot their ship. Humans conquer other worlds as part of the brutal Terran Empire.

== Appearance ==
Zefram Cochrane as portrayed by James Cromwell in Star Trek: First Contact

In "Metamorphosis", Cochrane was played by Glenn Corbett, who was 34 at the time of that episode's airing. In Star Trek: First Contact, Cochrane was played by the 56-year-old James Cromwell, at a point when the character, in 2063, would have been approximately 33 years old. The Star Trek Encyclopedia explains this discrepancy by theorizing that Cochrane's aged appearance in 2063 was the result of radiation poisoning, and that when he encountered the Companion, the Companion reversed these effects, and restored his youthful appearance.

== Non-canonical treatment ==
In the 1994 novel Federation by Judith and Garfield Reeves-Stevens, whose publication predated the release of Star Trek: First Contact by two years, Cochrane had been portrayed as a human of Earth origin. The novel suggested he retired to Alpha Centauri at some point between his first warp flight and his disappearance. This follows a suggestion made in the Star Trek Chronology, on the assumption humans could not have settled the Alpha Centauri system prior to the warp drive's invention.

In the novel, Cochrane's warp experiments are the result of a mysterious billionaire's financial and idealistic support in the period between the Eugenics Wars and World War III. His self-identification with Alpha Centauri results from it being the destination of his first warp voyage and his subsequent founding role in the first colony in the system. His life's story beyond his encounter with Kirk at Gamma Canaris in "Metamorphosis" is depicted up to his death during the events of the third season of Star Trek: The Next Generation.

In the 1989 reference book Worlds of the Federation, author Shane Johnson writes of Zefram Cochrane being a native to the Alpha Centauri system (which is populated by humans transplanted from Earth in antiquity) who is contacted by the United Nations spaceship Icarus, a sublight vessel which is the first human ship to travel to another solar system.

Lacking a common language and before the invention of the universal translator, he used mathematics alone to communicate his ideas for a faster-than-light drive system and its prototype, the WD-1.

Cochrane also appeared in issue #49 of Gold Key Comics's Star Trek series, along with Nancy Hedford and the Companion.
