= Shirley Jo Finney =

American actress (1949–2023)

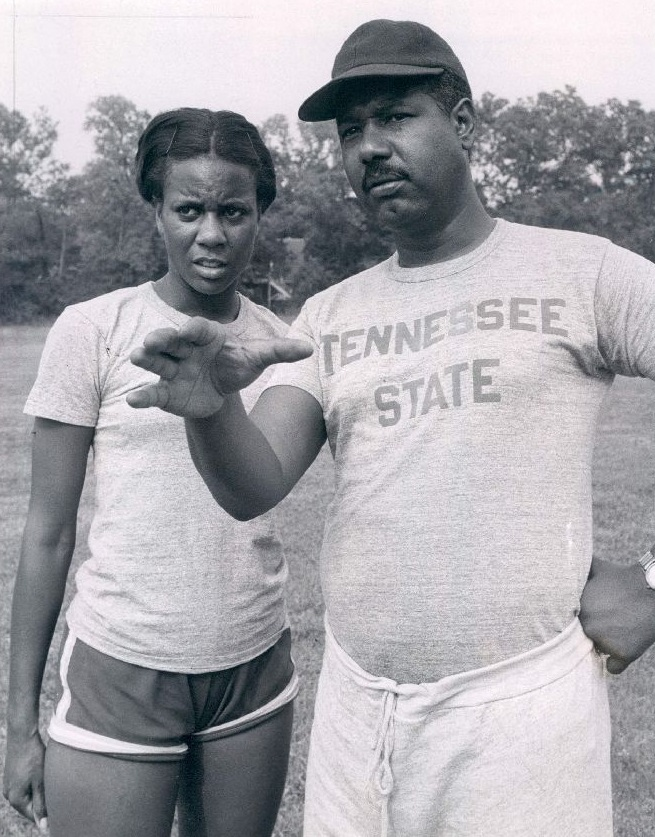
- Finney (left) with Jason Bernard in 1977
- Born: July 14, 1949; Merced, California, U.S.
- Died: October 10, 2023 (aged 74); Bellingham, Washington, U.S.
- Education: Sacramento State College (BFA); University of California, Los Angeles (MFA)
- Occupations: Actress; director
- Years active: 1973–2023

Shirley Jo Finney (July 14, 1949 – October 10, 2023) was an American actress and theater director.

Finney was born in Merced, California, in 1949, and grew up primarily in Sacramento, California. She graduated from Sacramento State College with a degree in theater in 1971, where she met and befriended Wilma Rudolph. She graduated from the University of California, Los Angeles in 1973 with a master's degree in theater arts, and thereafter began an acting career. She portrayed Wilma Rudolph in the 1977 television film Wilma. Finney continued to act into the 1990s. She attended the American Film Institute's Directing Workshop for Women.

As a director, Finney worked with The Fountain Theatre for many years, where she directed eight productions. She also directed plays at the Mark Taper Forum, the Kennedy Center for the Performing Arts, and the Humana Festival. Her work earned her recognition from the Los Angeles Drama Critics Circle, the Ovation Awards and the NAACP. In 2008, she was attached to direct a Broadway revival of for colored girls who have considered suicide / when the rainbow is enuf, but the production was scrapped due to a lack of funding. Finney directed plays across the United States, and her last credit was a 2023 production of Clyde's at The Ensemble Theatre in Houston.

Finney died from multiple myeloma at a hospital in Bellingham, Washington, on October 10, 2023, at the age of 74.

== Filmography ==
- Bunco Boys and How To Beat Them - Con Girl
- Temperatures Rising (1973)
- Police Woman (1974)
- Police Story (1974)
- Nashville Girl (1976)
- The River Niger (1976)
- The Blue Knight (1976)
- Wilma (1977)
- Mork & Mindy (1979)
- Tenspeed and Brown Shoe (1980)
- Lou Grant (1980)
- Hey Good Lookin' (1982)
- Echo Park (1986)
- Hill Street Blues (1986)
- Amen (1987)
- Uncle Tom's Cabin (1987)
- Nuts (1987)
- Moving (1988)
- Night Court (1989)
- CBS Schoolbreak Special (1990)
- Where I Live (1993)
