= Metamorphosis (Star Trek: The Original Series) =

- Star Trek: The Original Series episode
- Episode no.: Season 2 Episode 9
- Directed by: Ralph Senensky
- Written by: Gene L. Coon
- Cinematography by: Jerry Finnerman
- Production code: 031
- Original air date: November 10, 1967

Guest appearances
- Glenn Corbett – Zefram Cochrane; Elinor Donahue – Commissioner Nancy Hedford; Eddie Paskey – Lt. Leslie; William Blackburn – Lt. Hadley; Lisabeth Hush – Voice of the Companion (uncredited)

Episode chronology
| ← Previous "I, Mudd" | Next → "Journey to Babel" |
- Star Trek: The Original Series season 2

"Metamorphosis" is the ninth episode of the second season of the American science fiction television series Star Trek. Written by Gene L. Coon and directed by Ralph Senensky, it was first broadcast on November 10, 1967.

In the episode, a shuttle crew from the USS Enterprise encounters a man out of history and his mysterious alien companion. It is the franchise's first mention, and first appearance, of Zefram Cochrane.

== Plot ==
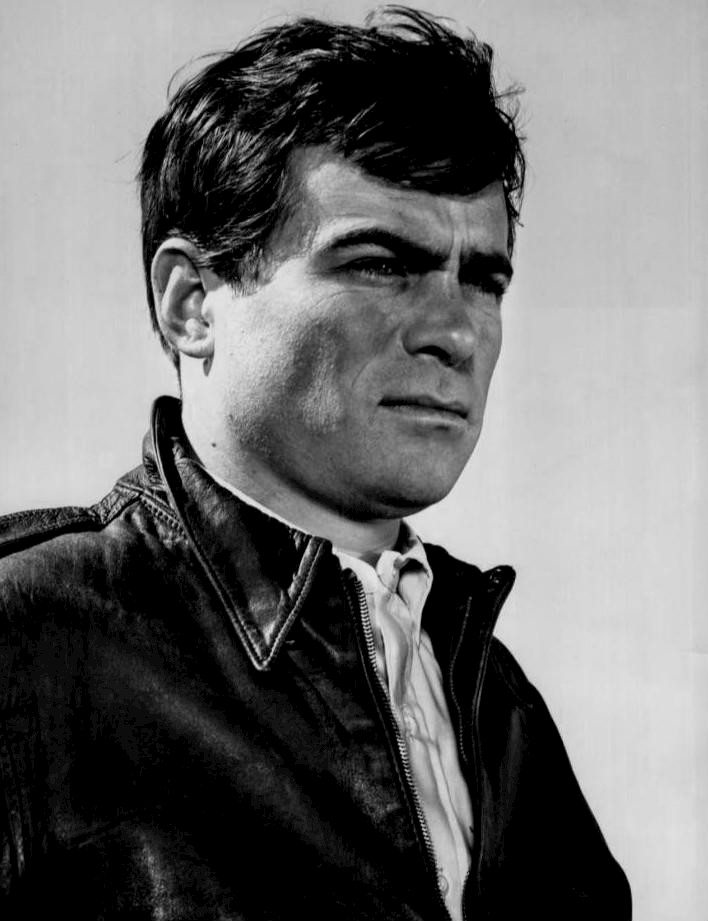
Glenn Corbett, 1963

Assistant Federation Commissioner Nancy Hedford is being ferried by shuttlecraft to the USS Enterprise to be treated for Sukaro's disease – a potentially fatal condition – before resuming a peacemaking mission. A glowing energy field appears in the shuttlecraft's path, and pulls it down to a nearby planetoid with an Earth-type atmosphere. All communications are blocked, and the shuttlecraft is totally inoperable.

Soon afterward, a young man calling himself Cochrane appears. He tells the party that he has been marooned on the planet for years and that a damping field is preventing their systems from working. Cochrane takes them to a shelter built from material salvaged from his crashed ship. In the course of their visit, Kirk and Spock and Dr. McCoy notice a glowing mass resembling the phenomenon that brought them to the planetoid. Cochrane calls this entity "the Companion", and explains that as an old man, he took one last flight, intending to die in space, but his crippled ship was intercepted and rescued by the entity, which restored him to youth and has been keeping him alive since. The Starfleet officers are stunned to discover that he is Zefram Cochrane, the inventor of warp drive. Cochrane then reveals why they were brought to the planetoid: he had told the Companion that he would die without the company of his own kind, believing it would release him. Instead, the Companion hijacked the shuttle.

When the Companion attacks Spock as he works on the shuttle, Spock deduces that the entity is largely composed of electrical energy. Kirk and Spock attempt to disable the Companion with an improvised electrical disruptor, but the Companion retaliates violently, and only Cochrane's intervention saves Kirk and Spock from being killed.

With Hedford's condition rapidly deteriorating, Spock modifies the shuttle's universal translator to communicate with the energy force. Kirk discovers it has a female personality and is in love with Cochrane. The Companion declares that it has stopped all of them from aging, and will keep them there forever as company for Cochrane. Cochrane, for his part, is disgusted by the idea of an intimate relationship with an alien, rejecting the idea of the Companion's love and affection for him. The dying Hedford, on the other hand, expresses her yearning to love and be loved before dying.

Cochrane summons the Companion again, and Kirk explains that it and Cochrane are too different for true love. The Companion hypothesizes about being human and disappears. Moments later, Hedford appears outside the shelter, completely restored to health, and they realize that the Companion has merged with Hedford within Hedford's body, which would otherwise have died within moments. In this way both Hedford and the Companion can experience love. Cochrane excitedly talks about his plans for traveling the galaxy, but the Companion/Hedford reveals that its life-force is bound to the planetoid; it cannot leave for more than a few days, so Cochrane chooses to remain with her out of love for her and gratitude, declaring that they will "have many years" together. Cochrane then requests that Kirk and his crew refrain from informing anyone about his presence on the asteroid so that he and the Companion/Hedford can be left in peace. When McCoy asks who will complete Nancy Hedford's mission, Kirk shrugs and says, "I'm sure the Federation can find another woman, somewhere, who'll stop that war."

== Production notes and reception ==
"Metamorphosis" was the Star Trek debut of Zefram Cochrane (created by writer Gene L. Coon), one of the key figures in the fictional history of the Star Trek "universe". In this episode, Cochrane is credited as "the discoverer of the space warp" — i.e., "warp drive" technology — which enabled Earth to achieve interstellar travel with faster-than-light starships. This led to Earth's first encounters with alien civilizations and the formation of the United Federation of Planets. In the series timeline (as it had evolved by 1967) Cochrane, "of Alpha Centauri", had vanished 150 years earlier at age 87 and was presumed dead. Commissioner Hedford, who embodies "the Companion", was portrayed by Elinor Donahue who was known for the 1960s sitcom The Andy Griffith Show, on which she played Ellie Walker, and the 1950s sitcom Father Knows Best, on which she played Jane Wyatt's eldest daughter. On the next broadcast Star Trek episode, Jane Wyatt guest-starred, portraying Spock's mother Amanda.

Guest star Donahue recalls that a number of scenes had to be reshot after flaws were discovered in the film stock during post-production. The reshoots involved calling back actors and rebuilding sets which had been struck.

Director Ralph Senensky was dissatisfied with the initial reading of the Companion's lines by Elizabeth Rogers and had them re-recorded by Lisabeth Hush.

Cochrane reappears as the focal character of the movie Star Trek: First Contact (1996), in which he is played by James Cromwell.

This episode was the first time in the original series that Kirk does not appear on board the Enterprise at any point.

In 2009, the A.V. Club rated this episode as a "B".

In 2024 Hollywood.com ranked Metamorphosis at number 29 out of the 79 original series episodes

== See also ==
- Immortality in fiction
