= Nashville Girl =

1976 film by Gus Trikonis

- Theatrical release poster
- Directed by: Gus Trikonis
- Written by: Peer J. Oppenheimer
- Starring: Monica Gayle; Glenn Corbett; Roger Davis; Johnny Rodriguez; Jesse White
- Distributed by: New World Pictures
- Release date: 1976
- Country: United States
- Language: English

Nashville Girl is a 1976 film from New World Pictures about an aspiring country and western singer.

It was also known as New Girl in Town and Country Music Daughter to capitalize on the success of the similar film Coal Miner's Daughter.

Roger Corman says the film was very popular in the South and also in Europe, which surprised him.

== Plot ==
Jamie, a 16 year old country music singer, runs away from home to try to become a star, only to find herself being sexually manipulated and exploited by older men in the country music business.

== Cast ==
- Monica Gayle as Jamie
- Glenn Corbett as Jeb
- Roger Davis as Kelly
- Johnny Rodriguez as Himself
- Jesse White as C.Y. Ordell
- Marcie Barkin as Alice
- Shirley Jo Finney as Frisky
- Judith Roberts as Fran
- Leo Gordon as Burt
