= List of awards and nominations received by The Walking Dead =

Awards and nominations received by The Walking Dead
Awards and nominations
| Award | Wins | Nominations |
| Primetime Emmy Awards | 2 | 16 |

Totals (Note: Certain award groups do not simply award one winner. They acknowledge several different recipients, have runners-up, and have third place. Since this is a specific recognition and is different from losing an award, runner-up mentions are considered wins in this award tally. For simplification and to avoid errors, each award in this list has been presumed to have had a prior nomination.)
- Wins: 70
- Nominations: 155

The Walking Dead is an American post-apocalyptic horror television series based on the comic series of the same name by Robert Kirkman, Tony Moore, and Charlie Adlard. Developed for television by Frank Darabont, the series airs exclusively on AMC in the United States and is broadcast internationally through Fox Networks Groups and Disney+. The story follows a group of survivors, initially led by Rick Grimes (Andrew Lincoln), as they attempt to survive a zombie apocalypse following a deadly pandemic. The series premiered on October 31, 2010, and has concluded as of November 20, 2022.

The following is a list of awards and accolades received by The Walking Dead over the course of its airing.

== Total awards and nominations for the cast ==
| Actor | Nominations | Awards |
|---|---|---|
| Andrew Lincoln | 22 | 5 |
| Melissa McBride | 14 | 4 |
| Norman Reedus | 10 | 5 |
| Chandler Riggs | 9 | 5 |
| Jeffrey Dean Morgan | 7 | 4 |
| Danai Gurira | 7 | 3 |
| Laurie Holden | 3 | 2 |
| David Morrissey | 3 | 1 |
| Lauren Cohan | 3 | 1 |
| Scott Wilson | 2 | 1 |
| Steven Yeun | 2 | 1 |
| Sarah Wayne Callies | 2 | 1 |
| Katelyn Nacon | 2 | 0 |
| Lennie James | 2 | 0 |
| Emily Kinney | 1 | 0 |
| Cassady McClincy | 1 | 0 |

== ASCAP Awards ==
The ASCAP Awards are awarded annually to composers for outstanding achievements and contributions to the world of film and television music. The Walking Dead has won six awards.

| Year | Category | Nominee(s) | Result | Ref. |
|---|---|---|---|---|
| 2012 | Top Television Series | Bear McCreary | Won | |
| 2013 | Top Television Series | Bear McCreary | Won | |
| 2014 | Top Television Series | Bear McCreary | Won | |
| 2015 | Top Television Series | Bear McCreary | Won | |
| 2016 | Top Television Series | Bear McCreary | Won | |
| 2016 | TV Composer of the Year | Bear McCreary | Won | |
| 2017 | Top Television Series | Bear McCreary | Won | |

== American Film Institute Awards ==
Established in 2000, the American Film Institute Awards (AFI) is presented by American Film Institute and honors the best ten outstanding films and television programs of each year. The Walking Dead has won twice.

| Year | Category | Nominee(s) | Result | Ref. |
|---|---|---|---|---|
| 2010 | Television Program of the Year | The Walking Dead | Won | |
| 2012 | Television Program of the Year | The Walking Dead | Won | |

== Artios Awards ==
The Casting Society of America annually present the Artios Awards to honor the work of casting directors in feature films, television and theatre. The Walking Dead has been nominated once.

| Year | Category | Nominee(s) | Result | Ref. |
|---|---|---|---|---|
| 2011 | Outstanding Achievement in Casting – Television Pilot – Drama | Sharon Bialy, Lisa Mae Fincannon, Sherry Thomas, Craig Fincannon | Nominated | |

== ASTRA Awards ==
The ASTRA Awards were awarded annually. According to the Australian Subscription Television and Radio Association (ASTRA), the awards "recognise the wealth of talent that drives the Australian subscription television industry and highlight the creativity, commitment and investment in production and broadcasting". The Walking Dead has won once, with three nominations.

| Year | Category | Nominee(s) | Result | Ref. |
|---|---|---|---|---|
| 2013 | Most Outstanding Drama – International | The Walking Dead | Nominated | |
| 2014 | Favourite Program – International Drama | The Walking Dead | Won | |
| 2015 | Most Outstanding Drama – International | The Walking Dead | Nominated | |

== BloodGuts UK Horror Awards ==
The BloodGuts UK Horror Awards are chosen annually by the BloodGuts UK Horror editors, honoring the best in films and television in the horror genre. The Walking Dead has been nominated once.

| Year | Category | Nominee(s) | Result | Ref. |
|---|---|---|---|---|
| 2016 | Best TV Show | The Walking Dead | Nominated | |

== Bram Stoker Awards ==
The Bram Stoker Awards are presented annually by the Horror Writers Association (HWA) for superior achievement in dark fantasy and horror writing. The Walking Dead has been nominated five times, with one win.

| Year | Category | Nominee(s) | Result | Ref. |
|---|---|---|---|---|
| 2011 | Superior Achievement in a Screenplay | Scott M. Gimple (for the episode "Save the Last One") | Nominated | |
| 2011 | Superior Achievement in a Screenplay | Scott M. Gimple (for the episode "Pretty Much Dead Already") | Nominated | |
| 2012 | Superior Achievement in a Screenplay | Sang Kyu Kim (for episode "Killer Within") | Nominated | |
| 2013 | Superior Achievement in a Screenplay | Glen Mazzara (for episode "Welcome to the Tombs") | Won | |
| 2014 | Superior Achievement in a Screenplay | Scott M. Gimple (for the episode "The Grove") | Nominated | |

== Cinema Audio Society Awards ==
The Cinema Audio Society Awards are annual awards recognizing achievement in sound mixing for film and television. The Walking Dead has been nominated twice.

| Year | Category | Nominee(s) | Result | Ref. |
|---|---|---|---|---|
| 2012 | Outstanding Achievement in Sound Mixing for Television Series | Gary D. Rogers, Bartek Swiatek, Dan Hiland (for the episode "What Lies Ahead") | Nominated | |
| 2013 | Outstanding Achievement in Sound Mixing for Television Series – 1 Hour | Michael P. Clark, Daniel J. Hiland, Gary D. Rogers, Greg Crawford, Eric Gotthelf, Stacey Michaels (for the episode "Home") | Nominated | |

== Costume Designers Guild Awards ==
The Costume Designers Guild is a labor union for costume designers. Annually they host an awards program recognizing excellence in costume design with five competitive awards for commercials, television, and motion pictures. The Walking Dead has been nominated once.

| Year | Category | Nominee(s) | Result | Ref. |
|---|---|---|---|---|
| 2017 | Outstanding Fantasy Television Series | Eulyn C. Womble | Nominated | |

== Critics' Choice Super Awards ==
| Year | Category | Nominee(s) | Result | Ref. |
|---|---|---|---|---|
| 2021 | Best Horror Series | The Walking Dead | Nominated | |
| 2021 | Best Villain in a Series | Samantha Morton | Nominated | |

== Critics' Choice Television Awards ==
The Critics' Choice Television Awards are presented annually by the Broadcast Television Journalists Association to honor the best in television programming. The Walking Dead has been nominated five times, with two wins.

| Year | Category | Nominee(s) | Result | Ref. |
|---|---|---|---|---|
| 2011 | Best Drama Series | The Walking Dead | Nominated | |
| 2013 | Best Actor in a Drama Series | Andrew Lincoln | Nominated | |
| 2014 | Best Supporting Actress in a Drama Series | Melissa McBride | Nominated | |
| 2015 | Most Bingeworthy Show | The Walking Dead | Won | |
| 2017 | Best Guest Performer in a Drama Series | Jeffrey Dean Morgan | Won | |

== Directors Guild of America Awards ==
The Directors Guild of America Awards are awarded annually by the Directors Guild of America, to honor the work of directors in film, television and commercials. The Walking Dead has been nominated once.

| Year | Category | Nominee(s) | Result | Ref. |
|---|---|---|---|---|
| 2010 | Outstanding Directorial Achievement in Dramatic Series | Frank Darabont (for the episode "Days Gone Bye") | Nominated | |

== Dorian Awards ==
The Dorian Awards are organized by the Gay and Lesbian Entertainment Critics Association (GALECA). The Walking Dead has been nominated once.

| Year | Category | Nominee(s) | Result | Ref. |
|---|---|---|---|---|
| 2011 | TV Drama of the Year | The Walking Dead | Nominated | |

== Eddie Awards ==
The Eddie Awards are presented annually by the American Cinema Editors, celebrating the best in film and television editing. The Walking Dead has been nominated twice, with one win.

| Year | Category | Nominee(s) | Result | Ref. |
|---|---|---|---|---|
| 2011 | Best Edited One-Hour Series for Commercial Television | Hunter M. Via (for the episode "Days Gone Bye") | Won | |
| 2012 | Best Edited One-Hour Series for Commercial Television | Hunter M. Via (for the episode "Save the Last One") | Nominated | |

== EWwy Awards/Poppy Awards ==
The Poppy Awards, formerly known as the EWwys, honors the Emmy-snubbed shows and actors of the year. The Walking Dead has won one award from eight nominations.

| Year | Category | Nominee(s) | Result | Ref. |
|---|---|---|---|---|
| 2011 | Best Drama | The Walking Dead | Nominated | |
| 2012 | Best Actor, Drama | Andrew Lincoln | Nominated | |
| 2014 | Best Supporting Actor, Drama | Norman Reedus | Nominated | |
| 2014 | Best Supporting Actress, Drama | Melissa McBride | Nominated | |
| 2015 | Best Actor, Drama | Andrew Lincoln | Nominated | |
| 2015 | Best Supporting Actress, Drama | Melissa McBride | Won | |
| 2016 | Best Actor, Drama | Andrew Lincoln | Nominated | |
| 2016 | Best Supporting Actress, Drama | Melissa McBride | Nominated | |

== Fangoria Chainsaw Awards ==
The Fangoria Chainsaw Awards are annual film and television awards for the horror and thriller genres, the nominees are chosen by Fangoria Magazine, then voting is open to the general public.

| Year | Category | Nominee(s) | Result | Ref. |
|---|---|---|---|---|
| 2015 | Best TV Series | The Walking Dead | Won | |
| 2015 | Best TV Actor | Andrew Lincoln | Nominated | |
| 2015 | Best TV Supporting Actor | Norman Reedus | Won | |
| 2015 | Best TV Supporting Actress | Melissa McBride | Nominated | |
| 2015 | Best TV Makeup/Creature FX | Greg Nicotero and Howard Berger | Won | |
| 2016 | Best TV Series | The Walking Dead | Nominated | |
| 2016 | Best TV Supporting Actor | Lennie James | Nominated | |
| 2016 | Best TV Makeup/Creature FX | Greg Nicotero and Howard Berger | Won | |
| 2017 | Best TV Supporting Actor | Jeffrey Dean Morgan | Nominated | |
| 2017 | Best TV SFX | Greg Nicotero and Howard Berger | Nominated | |

== Golden Globe Awards ==
The Golden Globe Award is an accolade bestowed by the 93 members of the Hollywood Foreign Press Association (HFPA) recognizing excellence in film and television, both domestic and foreign. The Walking Dead has been nominated once.

| Year | Category | Nominee(s) | Result | Ref. |
|---|---|---|---|---|
| 2010 | Best Television Series – Drama | The Walking Dead | Nominated | |

== Golden Reel Awards ==
The Golden Reel Awards are given out annually by the Motion Picture Sound Editors to recognize the artistic merit of sound editing in the categories Dialogue, ADR, Effects, Foley and Music.

| Year | Category | Nominee(s) | Result | Ref. |
|---|---|---|---|---|
| 2011 | Best Sound Editing in Television Short Form – Dialogue and Automated Dialogue Replacement | Kenneth Young, Bruce M. Honda, Darleen Stoker, Lou Thomas, Walter Newman (for the episode "Guts") | Won | |
| 2011 | Best Sound Editing: Long Form Sound Effects and Foley in Television | Walter Newman, Kenneth Young, Jerry Edemann, David Lee Fein, Hilda Hodges, Darleen R. Stoker, Peter Reynolds (for the episode "Days Gone Bye") | Nominated | |
| 2011 | Best Sound Editing: Long Form Dialogue and ADR in Television | Walter Newman, Kenneth Young, Darleen R. Stoker, Lou Thomas, Bruce Honda, Skip Schoolnik (for the episode "Days Gone Bye") | Nominated | |
| 2012 | Best Sound Editing in Television Long Form – Sound Effects & Foley | Gary D. Rogers, Gregg Barbanell, Pamela Kahn, Stacey Michaels (for the episode "What Lies Ahead") | Won | |
| 2012 | Best Sound Editing: Long Form Dialogue and ADR in Television | Jerry Ross, Lou Thomas, Steffan Falesitch, Karyn Foster (for the episode "What Lies Ahead") | Nominated | |
| 2012 | Best Sound Editing: Short Form Dialogue and ADR in Television | Jerry Ross, Lou Thomas, Steffan Falesitch (for the episode "Save the Last One") | Nominated | |
| 2016 | Best Sound Editing in Television, Short Form: Dialogue / ADR | Jerry Ross (for the episode "Spend") | Nominated | |
| 2016 | Best Sound Editing in Television, Long Form: Dialogue / ADR | Jerry Ross | Nominated | |
| 2017 | Best Sound Editing in Television, Short Form: Dialogue / ADR | Jerry Ross, Lou Thomas and Tim Farrell (for the episode "Hearts Still Beating") | Nominated | |

== IGN Awards ==
The IGN Awards are chosen annually by the IGN editors, honoring the best in film, television, games, comics and anime. The Walking Dead has won five awards from fifteen nominations.

| Year | Category | Nominee(s) | Result | Ref. |
|---|---|---|---|---|
| 2010 | Best New TV Series | The Walking Dead | Nominated | |
| 2010 | Best TV Hero | Andrew Lincoln as Rick Grimes | Won | |
| 2011 | Best TV Sci-Fi/Horror Series | The Walking Dead | Nominated | |
| 2011 | Best TV DVD or Blu-Ray | The Walking Dead: The Complete First Season (DVD/Blu-ray) | Won | |
| 2011 | Best TV Twist | "What Really Happened to Shane and Otis?" | Nominated | |
| 2012 | Best TV Series | The Walking Dead | Nominated | |
| 2012 | Best TV Sci-Fi/Horror Series | The Walking Dead | Won | |
| 2012 | Best TV Hero | Norman Reedus as Daryl Dixon | Won | |
| 2012 | Best TV DVD or Blu-Ray | The Walking Dead: The Complete Second Season (DVD/Blu-ray) | Nominated | |
| 2013 | Best TV Horror Series | The Walking Dead | Nominated | |
| 2013 | Best TV Episode | "Clear" | Nominated | |
| 2014 | Best TV Horror Series | The Walking Dead | Nominated | |
| 2014 | Best TV Hero | Melissa McBride as Carol Peletier | Nominated | |
| 2014 | Best TV Comic Book Adaptation | The Walking Dead | Nominated | |
| 2015 | Best Horror Series | The Walking Dead | Nominated | |
| 2015 | Best TV Comic Book Adaptation | The Walking Dead | Nominated | |
| 2016 | Best Horror Series | The Walking Dead | Won | |

== IGN People's Choice Awards ==
The IGN People's Choice Awards are voted on annually by the general public, they honor the best in film, television, games, comics and anime. The Walking Dead has won five awards.

| Year | Category | Nominee(s) | Result | Ref. |
|---|---|---|---|---|
| 2011 | Best TV Sci-Fi/Horror Series | The Walking Dead | Won | |
| 2011 | Best TV DVD or Blu-Ray | The Walking Dead: The Complete First Season – Limited Edition (DVD/Blu-ray) | Won | |
| 2012 | Best TV Sci-Fi/Horror Series | The Walking Dead | Won | |
| 2012 | Best TV Hero | Norman Reedus as Daryl Dixon | Won | |
| 2013 | Best TV Horror Series | The Walking Dead | Won | |

== ICG Publicists Awards ==
The ICG Publicists Awards hosts the annual Maxwell Weinberg Publicist Showmanship Awards which honors its members working in film and television whose achievements in publicity and promotion are deemed outstanding. The Walking Dead has been nominated once.

| Year | Category | Nominee(s) | Result | Ref. |
|---|---|---|---|---|
| 2011 | Maxwell Weinberg Publicist Showmanship Awards for Television | The Walking Dead | Nominated | |

== Kids Choice Awards ==
The Nickelodeon Kids' Choice Awards is an annual American children's awards ceremony honoring the year's biggest television, movie, and music acts as voted by viewers worldwide of Nickelodeon networks. The Walking dead has received one nomination.

| Year | Category | Nominee(s) | Result | Ref. |
|---|---|---|---|---|
| 2018 | Favorite TV Actor | Andrew Lincoln | Nominated | |
| 2019 | Favorite TV Drama | | Nominated | |

== Make-Up Artists and Hair Stylists Guild Awards ==
The Make-Up Artists & Hair Stylists Guild is the official labor union for make-up artists and hair stylists in film, television, stage, commercials and digital media. The annual awards recognize artistic achievement from its members. The Walking Dead has won three times from six nominations, Greg Nicotero has won three awards out of his four nominations.

| Year | Category | Nominee(s) | Result | Ref. |
|---|---|---|---|---|
| 2014 | Television and New Media Series – Best Special Makeup Effects | Greg Nicotero, Jake Garber | Won | |
| 2015 | Television and New Media Series – Best Contemporary Makeup | Essie Cha, Mayumi Murakami and Chauntelle Langston | Nominated | |
| 2015 | Television and New Media Series – Best Special Makeup Effects | Greg Nicotero, Jake Garber | Won | |
| 2016 | Television and New Media Series – Best Contemporary Makeup | Essie Cha, Tracy Salazar | Nominated | |
| 2016 | Television and New Media Series – Best Special Makeup Effects | Greg Nicotero, Garrett Immel | Won | |
| 2017 | Television and New Media Series – Best Special Make-Up Effects | Greg Nicotero, Jake Garber | Nominated | |
| 2018 | Television and New Media Series – Best Special Make-Up Effects | Greg Nicotero | Nominated | |

== MTV Movie and TV Awards ==
The MTV Movie & TV Awards are an annual film and television awards show presented on MTV. The nominees are decided by producers and executives at MTV, and winners are decided online by the general public. The Walking Dead has won once from two nominations.

| Year | Category | Nominee(s) | Result | Ref. |
|---|---|---|---|---|
| 2017 | Best Actor in a Show | Jeffrey Dean Morgan | Nominated | |
| 2017 | Best Villain | Jeffrey Dean Morgan | Won | |

== NAACP Image Awards ==
The NAACP Image Awards are annually presented to people of color in film, television, music and literature. The Walking Dead has been nominated once.

| Year | Category | Nominee(s) | Result | Ref. |
|---|---|---|---|---|
| 2016 | Outstanding Supporting Actress in a Drama Series | Danai Gurira | Nominated | |

== People's Choice Awards ==
The People's Choice Awards is an American awards show recognizing the people and the work of popular culture. The show has been held annually since 1975 and is voted on by the general public. The Walking Dead has won five awards from seventeen nominations.

| Year | Category | Nominee(s) | Result | Ref. |
|---|---|---|---|---|
| 2012 | Favorite Sci-Fi/Fantasy Show | The Walking Dead | Nominated | |
| 2013 | Favorite Sci-Fi/Fantasy Show | The Walking Dead | Nominated | |
| 2013 | Favorite Cable TV Drama | The Walking Dead | Nominated | |
| 2014 | Favorite Sci-Fi/Fantasy Show | The Walking Dead | Nominated | |
| 2014 | Favorite Cable TV Drama | The Walking Dead | Won | |
| 2014 | Favorite TV Anti-Hero | Andrew Lincoln | Won | |
| 2014 | Favorite TV Hero | Norman Reedus | Won | |
| 2014 | Favorite Sci-Fi/Fantasy TV Actor | Andrew Lincoln | Nominated | |
| 2015 | Favorite TV Show | The Walking Dead | Nominated | |
| 2015 | Favorite Cable TV Sci-Fi/Fantasy | The Walking Dead | Nominated | |
| 2015 | Favorite TV Character We Miss Most | Scott Wilson | Nominated | |
| 2016 | Favorite TV Show | The Walking Dead | Nominated | |
| 2016 | Favorite Cable TV Sci-Fi/Fantasy | The Walking Dead | Won | |
| 2017 | Favorite TV Show | The Walking Dead | Nominated | |
| 2017 | Favorite Cable Sci-Fi/Fantasy TV Show | The Walking Dead | Won | |
| 2017 | Favorite Sci-Fi/Fantasy TV Actor | Andrew Lincoln | Nominated | |
| 2017 | Favorite Sci-Fi/Fantasy TV Actress | Lauren Cohan | Nominated | |
| 2018 | The Show of 2018 | The Walking Dead | Nominated | |
| 2018 | The Drama Show of 2018 | The Walking Dead | Nominated | |
| 2018 | The Male TV Star of 2018 | Andrew Lincoln | Nominated | |
| 2018 | The Male TV Star of 2018 | Norman Reedus | Nominated | |
| 2018 | The Female TV Star of 2018 | Lauren Cohan | Nominated | |
| 2018 | The Female TV Star of 2018 | Danai Gurira | Nominated | |
| 2018 | The Drama TV Star of 2018 | Andrew Lincoln | Nominated | |
| 2018 | The Bingeworthy Show of 2018 | The Walking Dead | Nominated | |
| 2019 | The Show of 2019 | The Walking Dead | Nominated | |
| 2019 | The Drama Show of 2019 | The Walking Dead | Nominated | |
| 2019 | The Male TV Star of 2019 | Norman Reedus | Nominated | |
| 2019 | The Female TV Star of 2019 | Danai Gurira | Nominated | |
| 2019 | The Drama TV Star of 2019 | Norman Reedus | Nominated | |
| 2020 | The Drama Show of 2020 | The Walking Dead | Nominated | |
| 2020 | The Male TV Star of 2019 | Norman Reedus | Nominated | |
| 2020 | The Female TV Star of 2019 | Danai Gurira | Nominated | |
| 2020 | The Drama TV Star of 2019 | Danai Gurira | Nominated | |
| 2021 | The Drama Show of 2021 | The Walking Dead | Nominated | |
| 2021 | The Male TV Star of 2021 | Norman Reedus | Nominated | |
| 2021 | The Drama TV Star of 2021 | Norman Reedus | Nominated | |
| 2022 | The Drama Show of 2022 | The Walking Dead | Nominated | |
| 2022 | The Male TV Star of 2022 | Norman Reedus | Nominated | |
| 2022 | The Drama TV Star of 2022 | Norman Reedus | Nominated | |

== Primetime Emmy Awards ==
The Primetime Emmy Award, often referred to simply as the Emmy, is an American award bestowed by the Academy of Television Arts & Sciences in recognition of excellence in American primetime television programming, and corresponds to the Academy Award (for film), the Tony Award (for theatre), and the Grammy Award (for music). The Walking Dead has won two awards out of sixteen nominations.

| Year | Category | Nominee(s) | Result | Ref. |
|---|---|---|---|---|
| 2011 | Outstanding Prosthetic Makeup for a Series, Limited Series, Movie, or Special | Greg Nicotero, Andy Schoneberg, Garrett Immel, Jake Garber, Kevin Wasner, Howard Berger, and Jaremy Aiello (Episode: "Days Gone Bye") | Won | |
| 2011 | Outstanding Sound Editing for a Series | Darleen Stoker, Walter Newman, Michael Baber, Jerry Edemann, Kenneth Young, David Lee Fein, Hilda Hodges (Episode: "Days Gone Bye") | Nominated | |
| 2011 | Outstanding Special Visual Effects for a Series | Jason Sperling, Kristin Johnson, Sam Nicholson, Kent Johnson, Michael Enriquez, Christopher D. Martin, Anthony Ocampo, Michael Cook, Gregory Nicotero (Episode: "Days Gone Bye") | Nominated | |
| 2012 | Outstanding Prosthetic Makeup for a Series, Limited Series, Movie, or Special | Greg Nicotero, Jake Garber, Andy Schoneberg, Kevin Wasner, Gino Crognale, Carey Jones, and Garrett Immel (Episode: "What Lies Ahead") | Won | |
| 2012 | Outstanding Sound Editing for a Series | Jerry Ross, Lou Thomas, Tim Farrell, Phil Barrie, David Lee Fein, Hilda Hodges (Episode: "Beside the Dying Fire") | Nominated | |
| 2012 | Outstanding Special Visual Effects for a Series | Victor Scalise, Jason Sperling, Darrell Pritchett, Eddie Bonin, Valeri Pfahning, Spence Fuller, Martin Hilke, Michael Cook, and Jon Rosenthal (Episode: "Beside the Dying Fire") | Nominated | |
| 2013 | Outstanding Prosthetic Makeup for a Series, Limited Series, Movie, or Special | Greg Nicotero, Jake Garber, Andy Schoneberg, Garrett Immel, Kevin Wasner, Gino Crognale, Carey Jones, Derek Krout (Episode: "This Sorrowful Life") | Nominated | |
| 2014 | Outstanding Sound Editing for a Series | Jerry Ross, Michael Baber, Tim Farrell, Lou Thomas, Clayton Weber (Episode: "Too Far Gone") | Nominated | |
| 2014 | Outstanding Special and Visual Effects in a Supporting Role | Victor Scalise, Darrell Pritchett, Matt Robken, Gary Romey, Martin Hilke, Diego Galtieri, Michael Cook, William L. Arance, Dylen Velasquez (Episode: "30 Days Without an Accident") | Nominated | |
| 2015 | Outstanding Prosthetic Make-up for a Series, Limited Series, Movie, or Special | Greg Nicotero, Jake Garber, Carey Jones, Garrett Immel, Gino Crognale, Kevin Wasner, Andy Schoneberg, (Episode: "Strangers") | Nominated | |
| 2015 | Outstanding Sound Editing for a Series | Jerry Ross, Tim Farrell, Lou Thomas, Michael Baber, Joseph Tsai, Clayton Weber, Catherine Harper, Gregg Barbanell, (Episode: "Conquer") | Nominated | |
| 2015 | Outstanding Special Visual Effects in a Supporting Role | Victor Scalise, Darrell Pritchett, Matt Robken, Gary Romey, Martin Hilke, Franco Leng, Dylen Velasquez, Michael Cook, William L. Arance (Episode: "Conquer") | Nominated | |
| 2015 | Outstanding Stunt Coordination for a Drama Series, Limited Series, or Movie | Monty Simons | Nominated | |
| 2016 | Outstanding Prosthetic Make-up for a Series, Limited Series, Movie, or Special | Greg Nicotero, Jake Garber, Gino Crognale, Kevin Wasner, Garrett Immel, Kerrin Jackson, Carey Jones (Episode: "No Way Out") | Nominated | |
| 2016 | Outstanding Special Visual Effects in a Supporting Role | Victor Scalise, Matt Robken, Darrell Pritchett, David Alexander, Michael Crane, Chad Hudson, Staffan Linder, Sean Ritchie, Aldo Ruggiero (Episode: "No Way Out") | Nominated | |
| 2017 | Outstanding Prosthetic Make-up for a Series, Limited Series, Movie, or Special | Greg Nicotero, Jake Garber, Garrett Immel, Kevin Wasner, Gino Crognale, Kerrin Jackson (Episode: "The Day Will Come When You Won't Be") | Nominated | |

== Satellite Awards ==
The Satellite Awards are a set of annual awards given by the International Press Academy. The Walking Dead has won three awards from seven nominations.

| Year | Category | Nominee(s) | Result | Ref. |
|---|---|---|---|---|
| 2011 | Best Genre Series | The Walking Dead | Nominated | |
| 2012 | Best Genre Series | The Walking Dead | Won | |
| 2012 | Best Television Cast | Andrew Lincoln, Sarah Wayne Callies, Laurie Holden, Norman Reedus, Steven Yeun, Lauren Cohan, Chandler Riggs, Melissa McBride, Scott Wilson, Danai Gurira, Michael Rooker, and David Morrissey | Won | |
| 2013 | Best Genre Series | The Walking Dead | Nominated | |
| 2014 | Best Genre Series | The Walking Dead | Nominated | |
| 2015 | Best Genre Series | The Walking Dead | Won | |
| 2016 | Best Genre Series | The Walking Dead | Nominated | |

== Saturn Awards ==
The Saturn Awards are presented annually by the Academy of Science Fiction, Fantasy and Horror Films to honor science fiction, fantasy, and horror films, television and home video.

| Year | Category | Nominee(s) | Result | Ref. |
|---|---|---|---|---|
| 2011 | Best Television Presentation | The Walking Dead | Won | |
| 2011 | Best Actor on Television | Andrew Lincoln | Nominated | |
| 2011 | Best Actress on Television | Sarah Wayne Callies | Nominated | |
| 2011 | Best Supporting Actor on Television | Steven Yeun | Nominated | |
| 2011 | Best Supporting Actress on Television | Laurie Holden | Nominated | |
| 2011 | Best Guest Starring Role on Television | Noah Emmerich | Nominated | |
| 2012 | Best Presentation on Television | The Walking Dead | Won | |
| 2012 | Best Supporting Actor on Television | Norman Reedus | Nominated | |
| 2012 | The Innovator Award | Robert Kirkman | Won | |
| 2013 | Best Syndicated/Cable Television Series | The Walking Dead | Won | |
| 2013 | Best Actor on Television | Andrew Lincoln | Nominated | |
| 2013 | Best Supporting Actor on Television | David Morrissey | Nominated | |
| 2013 | Best Supporting Actress on Television | Laurie Holden | Won | |
| 2014 | Best Syndicated/Cable Television Series | The Walking Dead | Won | |
| 2014 | Best Supporting Actress on Television | Melissa McBride | Won | |
| 2014 | Best Guest Starring Role on Television | David Morrissey | Nominated | |
| 2014 | Best Performance by a Younger Actor in a Television Series | Chandler Riggs | Won | |
| 2015 | Best Syndicated/Cable Television Series | The Walking Dead | Won | |
| 2015 | Best Actor on Television | Andrew Lincoln | Won | |
| 2015 | Best Supporting Actor on Television | Norman Reedus | Nominated | |
| 2015 | Best Supporting Actress on Television | Emily Kinney | Nominated | |
| 2015 | Best Supporting Actress on Television | Melissa McBride | Won | |
| 2015 | Best Guest Star on Television | Andrew J. West | Nominated | |
| 2015 | Best Performance by a Younger Actor in a Television Series | Chandler Riggs | Nominated | |
| 2016 | Best Horror Television Series | The Walking Dead | Won | |
| 2016 | Best Actor on Television | Andrew Lincoln | Nominated | |
| 2016 | Best Supporting Actress on Television | Tovah Feldshuh | Nominated | |
| 2016 | Best Supporting Actress on Television | Danai Gurira | Won | |
| 2016 | Best Supporting Actress on Television | Melissa McBride | Nominated | |
| 2016 | Best Guest Star on Television | John Carroll Lynch | Nominated | |
| 2016 | Best Performance by a Younger Actor on Television | Chandler Riggs | Won | |
| 2017 | Best Horror Television Series | The Walking Dead | Won | |
| 2017 | Best Actor on a Television Series | Andrew Lincoln | Won | |
| 2017 | Best Supporting Actor on a Television Series | Norman Reedus | Nominated | |
| 2017 | Best Supporting Actress on a Television Series | Danai Gurira | Nominated | |
| 2017 | Best Supporting Actress on a Television Series | Melissa McBride | Nominated | |
| 2017 | Best Younger Actor on a Television Series | Chandler Riggs | Nominated | |
| 2017 | Best Guest Performance on a Television Series | Jeffrey Dean Morgan | Won | |
| 2018 | Best Horror Television Series | The Walking Dead | Won | |
| 2018 | Best Actor on a Television Series | Andrew Lincoln | Nominated | |
| 2018 | Best Supporting Actor on a Television Series | Khary Payton | Nominated | |
| 2018 | Best Supporting Actress on a Television Series | Danai Gurira | Nominated | |
| 2018 | Best Supporting Actress on a Television Series | Melissa McBride | Nominated | |
| 2018 | Best Performance by a Younger Actor on a Television Series | Chandler Riggs | Won | |
| 2018 | Best Guest-Starring Performance on Television | Jeffrey Dean Morgan | Nominated | |
| 2019 | Best Horror Television Series | The Walking Dead | Won | |
| 2019 | Best Actor on a Television Series | Andrew Lincoln | Nominated | |
| 2019 | Best Supporting Actor on a Television Series | Khary Payton | Nominated | |
| 2019 | Best Supporting Actress on a Television Series | Danai Gurira | Won | |
| 2019 | Best Supporting Actress on a Television Series | Melissa McBride | Nominated | |
| 2019 | Best Guest-Starring Performance on Television | Jeffrey Dean Morgan | Won | |
| 2021 | Best Horror Television Series | The Walking Dead | Won | |
| 2021 | Best Supporting Actor on a Television Series | Norman Reedus | Nominated | |
| 2021 | Best Supporting Actress on a Television Series | Melissa McBride | Nominated | |
| 2021 | Best Younger Actor on a Television Series | Cassady McClincy | Nominated | |
| 2021 | Best Guest-Starring Performance on Television | Jeffrey Dean Morgan | Nominated | |
| 2022 | Best Horror Television Series: Network/Cable | The Walking Dead | Won | |
| 2022 | Best Supporting Actor in a Network or Cable Television Series | Michael James Shaw | Nominated | |
| 2022 | Best Supporting Actress in a Network or Cable Television Series | Lauren Cohan | Won | |
| 2022 | Best Supporting Actress in a Network or Cable Television Series | Melissa McBride | Nominated | |
| 2022 | Best Guest-Starring Performance in a Network or Cable Television Series | Michael Biehn | Nominated | |
| 2022 | Best Guest-Starring Performance in a Network or Cable Television Series | Jeffrey Dean Morgan | Nominated | |

== Screen Actors Guild Awards ==
The Screen Actors Guild Awards are organized by the Screen Actors Guild‐American Federation of Television and Radio Artists. First awarded in 1995, the awards aim to recognize excellent achievements in film and television. The Walking Dead has been nominated five times.

| Year | Category | Nominee(s) | Result | Ref. |
|---|---|---|---|---|
| 2013 | Outstanding Action Performance by a Stunt Ensemble in a Television Series | Ashley Rae Trisler, Russell Towery, Bob Fisher, Andy Rusk, Taylor Towery, Philip Dido and W. Dante Ha | Nominated | |
| 2014 | Outstanding Action Performance by a Stunt Ensemble in a Television Series | Shellita Boxie, Elizabeth Davidovich, Becky Decker, Bob Fisher, Cal Johnson, Jasi Cotton Lanier, Ben Loggins, T. Ryan Mooney, Andy Rusk, Russell Towery, Taylor Towery | Nominated | |
| 2015 | Outstanding Action Performance by a Stunt Ensemble in a Television Series | Jennifer Badger, Tye Claybrook Jr., Marcelle Coletti, Elizabeth Davidovich, Greg Dela Riva, Becky Decker, Nick DeKay, Philip Dido, Bob Fisher, Karin Justman, Ben Loggins, Anderson Martin, T.Ryan Mooney, Meredith Richardson, Andy Rusk, Dalton Simons, Monty L. Simons, Savannah Simons, Russell Towery, Ashley Rae Trisler, Kevin Waterman | Nominated | |
| 2016 | Outstanding Action Performance by a Stunt Ensemble in a Television Series | Laura M. Beamer, Marcelle Coletti, Stephen Conroy, Raven-Danielle Baker, Elizabeth Davidovich, Keith Splinter Davis, Nick DeKay, Greg Dela Riva, Anthony DiRocco, Ian Eyre, Rachel Gelfeld, Damita Jane Howard, Duke Jackson, Cal Johnson, Ashley Rae Trisler, Marque Ohmes, Ryan D. Olson, Meredith Richardson, Bayland Rippenkroeger, Andy Rusk, Felipe Savahge, Dalton Simons, Monty L. Simons, Savannah Simons, Christopher Tardieu, Nikki Tomlinson, Casey Ann Zeller | Nominated | |
| 2017 | Outstanding Action Performance by a Stunt Ensemble in a Television Series | Marcelle Coletti, Stephen Conroy, Gino Crognale, Elizabeth Davidovich, Greg Dela Riva, Loren Dennis, Anthony DiRocco, Shauna Galligan, Cal Johnson, Kara Kimmer, Jordan Malone, Marque Ohmes Meredith Richardson, Bayland Rippenkroeger, Andy Rusk, Felipe Savahge, Dalton Simons, Monty L. Simons, Savannah Simons, Nikki Tomlinson, Amy Lynn Tuttle, Tony Vittorioso | Nominated | |
| 2018 | Outstanding Action Performance by a Stunt Ensemble in a Television Series | N/A | Nominated | |
| 2019 | Outstanding Performance by a Stunt Ensemble in a Television Series | The Walking Dead | Nominated | |
| 2020 | Outstanding Performance by a Stunt Ensemble in a Television Series | The Walking Dead | Nominated | |

== Society of Camera Operators Awards ==
The Society of Camera Operators is an internationally recognized professional honorary society. They host annual awards recognizing the achievement of camera operators in film and television. The Walking Dead has been nominated once.

| Year | Category | Nominee(s) | Result | Ref. |
|---|---|---|---|---|
| 2015 | Camera Operator of the Year – Television | Stephen Campbell | Nominated | |

== Television Critics Association Awards ==
The members of the Television Critics Association vote annually for outstanding achievements in television. The Walking Dead has been nominated twice.

| Year | Category | Nominee(s) | Result | Ref. |
|---|---|---|---|---|
| 2011 | Outstanding New Program | The Walking Dead | Nominated | |
| 2013 | Program of the Year | The Walking Dead | Nominated | |

== Teen Choice Awards ==
The Teen Choice Awards is an annual awards show that airs on the Fox Network. The awards honor the year's biggest achievements in music, movies, sports, television, fashion and other categories, voted by teen viewers. The Walking Dead has won twice from four nominations.

| Year | Category | Nominee(s) | Result | Ref. |
|---|---|---|---|---|
| 2011 | Choice TV: Breakout Show | The Walking Dead | Nominated | |
| 2013 | Choice TV: Action Horror Show | The Walking Dead | Won | |
| 2014 | Choice TV: Action Horror Show | The Walking Dead | Won | |
| 2016 | Choice TV Actor: Fantasy/Sci-Fi | Andrew Lincoln | Nominated | |

== TP de Oro ==
The TP de Oro was a Spanish awards show, honoring the best in Spanish and international television programming. The Walking Dead was nominated once.

| Year | Category | Nominee(s) | Result |
|---|---|---|---|
| 2012 | Best Foreign Series | The Walking Dead | Nominated |

== TV Quick Awards ==
The TV Quick Awards were annual television awards, presented by TV Quick magazine, the winners were voted for by the general public. The Walking Dead was nominated once.

| Year | Category | Nominee(s) | Result |
|---|---|---|---|
| 2011 | Best New Drama | Frank Darabont, Tom Luse, Denise M. Huth | Nominated |

== Visual Effects Society Awards ==
Visual Effects Society Awards are presented by the Visual Effects Society and honors the work of visual effects artists in film, television, commercials, music videos and video games. The Walking Dead has been nominated once.

| Year | Category | Nominee(s) | Result | Ref. |
|---|---|---|---|---|
| 2011 | Outstanding Supporting Visual Effects in a Broadcast Program | Sam Nicholson, Kent Johnson, Christopher D. Martin, Jason Sperling | Nominated | |

== World Soundtrack Awards ==
The World Soundtrack Academy holds annual awards honoring the music professionals involved in film and television. The Walking Dead has one nomination.

| Year | Category | Nominee(s) | Result | Ref. |
|---|---|---|---|---|
| 2016 | Television Composer of the Year | Bear McCreary | Nominated | |

== Writers Guild of America Awards ==
The Writers Guild of America Awards are annual awards given for outstanding writing in film, television, radio, and video games, for both fiction and non-fiction media. The Walking Dead has been nominated twice.

| Year | Category | Nominee(s) | Result | Ref. |
|---|---|---|---|---|
| 2010 | New Series | Frank Darabont, Robert Kirkman, Glen Mazzara, Jack LoGiudice, Charles H. Eglee, Adam Fierro | Nominated | |
| 2011 | Outstanding Achievement in Writing Derivative New Media | John Esposito, Greg Nicotero (Torn Apart webisodes "A New Day", "Family Matters", "Neighborly Advice", "Step Mom" and "Everything Dies") | Nominated | |

== Young Artist Awards ==
The Young Artist Awards honor young people's achievements in film and television. The Walking Dead has won once out of eight nominations.

| Year | Category | Nominee(s) | Result | Ref. |
|---|---|---|---|---|
| 2012 | Best Performance in a TV Series – Leading Young Actor | Chandler Riggs | Nominated | |
| 2012 | Best Performance in a TV Series – Recurring Young Actress | Madison Leisle | Nominated | |
| 2013 | Best Performance in a TV Series – Leading Young Actor | Chandler Riggs | Nominated | |
| 2013 | Best Performance in a TV Series – Supporting Young Actress | Madison Lintz | Nominated | |
| 2014 | Best Performance in a TV Series – Leading Young Actor | Chandler Riggs | Won | |
| 2016 | Best Performance in a TV Series – Recurring Young Actor (13 and under) | Major Dodson | Nominated | |
| 2016 | Best Performance in a TV Series – Recurring Young Actress (14–21) | Katelyn Nacon | Nominated | |
| 2017 | Best Performance in a TV Series – Recurring Teen Actress | Katelyn Nacon | Nominated | |
