= Echo Park (1986 film) =

1986 film by Robert Dornhelm

- DVD cover
- Directed by: Robert Dornhelm
- Written by: Michael Ventura
- Produced by: Walter Shenson
- Starring: Susan Dey; Tom Hulce; Michael Bowen; Shirley Jo Finney
- Cinematography: Karl Kofler
- Edited by: Ingrid Koller
- Music by: David Anderle; Aaron Jacoves
- Distributed by: Atlantic Releasing Corporation
- Release date: May 16, 1986
- Running time: 88 min
- Country: United States
- Language: English
- Box office: $700,000 (domestic)

Echo Park is a 1986 American comedy-drama film set in the Echo Park neighborhood of Los Angeles, California. The plot follows several aspiring actors, musicians and models. The film premiered at the 42nd Venice International Film Festival, in the Venezia Giovani (Venice Youth) sidebar. The cast includes Tom Hulce, Susan Dey, Cheech Marin and Michael Bowen. Cassandra Peterson, better known as Elvira, has a brief cameo as a secretary. Echo Park was the final film of veteran actor Timothy Carey.

== Plot ==
May, a single mom, wants to become an actress. Her next-door neighbor August, a bodybuilder, wants to become a worthy successor to his hero, Arnold Schwarzenegger. They live in a district of Los Angeles known as Echo Park, not far from Dodger Stadium, and dream of a better life.

Jonathan, a pizza delivery boy, arrives at May's door and is immediately smitten with her, and quickly rents the spare room in her apartment. As he entertains her young son, Henry, she goes out to pursue an acting opportunity that has come along, only to discover that it involves disrobing in private residences and delivering "strip-o-grams." May gives the job doing strip-o-grams a try, while August tries to meet his idol at a reception at the Austrian embassy; in the meanwhile, Jonathan worries that the two are more than mere neighbors.

== Cast ==
- Susan Dey as May Greer
- Tom Hulce as Jonathan
- Michael Bowen as August Reichtenstein
- Christopher Walker as Henry Greer
- Shirley Jo Finney as Gloria
- Heinrich Schweiger as Mr. Reichtenstein
- Cheech Marin as Syd
- John Paragon as Hugo
- Cassandra Peterson as Sheri
- Timothy Carey as Vinnie
- Robert R. Shafer as Commercial Director
- Skip O'Brien as Prisoner
- Biff Yeager as Jailer

== Reception ==
Echo Park maintains a 78% fresh rating at Rotten Tomatoes. Roger Ebert gave the film three out of four stars, saying that the film "has no great statement to make and no particular plot to unfold. Its ambition is to introduce us to these people and let them live with us for a while. The movie is low-key, unaffected and sometimes very funny." A contemporary Variety review described it as "wittily scripted and full of oddball twists", and paired it to Wim Wenders' Paris, Texas as both being "quite successful views of the States made by talented European directors".
