= Glenn Corbett =

American actor (1933–1993)

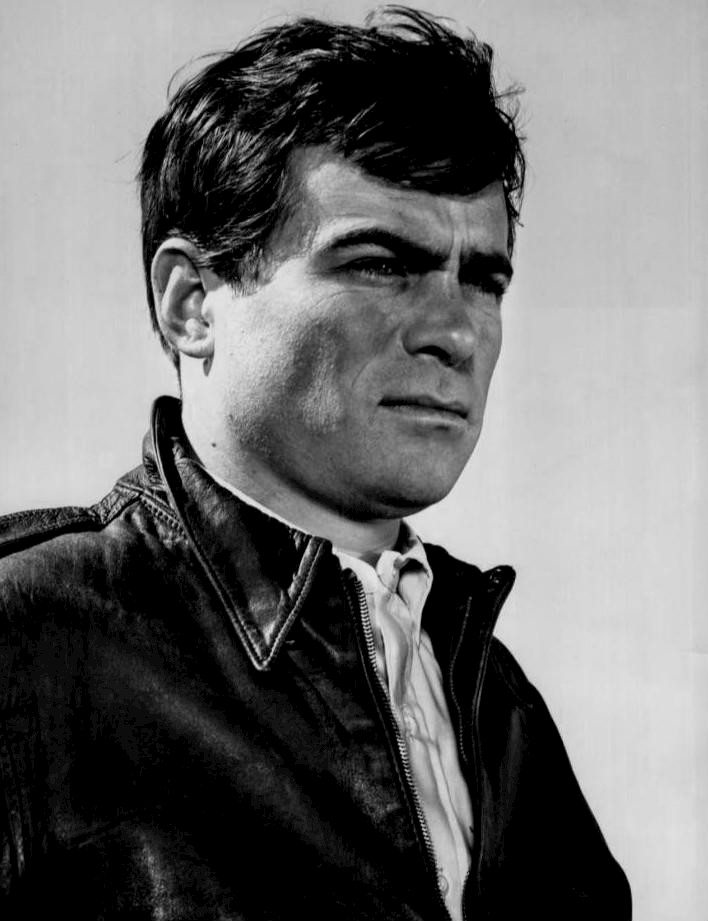
- Corbett in Route 66 (1963)
- Born: Glenn Edwin Rothenburg; August 17, 1933; El Monte, California, U.S.
- Died: January 16, 1993 (aged 59); San Antonio, Texas, U.S.
- Occupation: Actor
- Years active: 1959–1993
- Spouses: Judy Daniels (m. 1957; div. 1973) Kathryn Lea Glisson (m. 1977; div. 1977) Jackie Lynn Henry (m. 1978; div. 1978)
- Children: 2

Glenn Corbett (born Glenn Edwin Rothenburg; August 17, 1933 – January 16, 1993) was an American actor in movies and television for more than 30 years. He came to national attention in the early 1960s, when he replaced George Maharis in the cast of the popular CBS adventure drama Route 66. He followed this with roles in high-profile films and television shows, including a guest role in the original Star Trek series, the daytime soap opera The Doctors, the primetime soap Dallas, and movies such as Chisum with John Wayne, as one of Jimmy Stewart's sons in Shenandoah, and the World War II epic Midway.

== Early years ==
Corbett was born on August 17, 1933, in El Monte, California, the son of Sarah Belle (née Holland, 1914–1991) and John Warren Rothenburg (1912–1968), a garage mechanic.

After serving in the United States Navy as a Seabee, he met his wife Judy at Occidental College in Los Angeles, and with her encouragement, he began acting in campus theater plays. A talent scout saw him and he was signed to a contract with Columbia Pictures. In his youth, Corbett did modeling work for photographer Bob Mizer.

== Film and television career ==
Corbett's film debut was in The Crimson Kimono (1959); it was followed with supporting roles in The Mountain Road, Man on a String (1960), and All the Young Men (all 1960). He took the lead role in William Castle's suspense thriller, Homicidal (1961) and was cast as one of the sons of Jimmy Stewart's character in the Civil War film Shenandoah (1965). In other film work, he starred as Pat Garrett, opposite John Wayne in Chisum (1970). He again co-starred with Wayne in Big Jake (1971). Later, he appeared in Nashville Girl (1976) and Midway (1976).

In 1963, Corbett replaced George Maharis on Route 66. Corbett, playing Lincoln Case, co-starred with Martin Milner during part of the third season and the fourth and final season of the series (1963–64). In 1964–65, he had a role on 12 O'Clock High as Lt. Tom Lockridge for two episodes.

Corbett's other television roles in the early to late 1960s include Wes Macauley on It's a Man's World (1962–63). He was featured in 1964 as Dan Collins in an episode of Gunsmoke titled "Chicken" in which a man gets an undeserved reputation as a gunman when he is found at a way station with four dead outlaws at his feet. Corbett was cast in a 1965 episode of Bonanza, "Mighty Is the Word", in which he portrayed a gunfighter who finds religion and becomes a preacher, only to be confronted by a vengeful man whose brother he had killed. In the 1965–1966 season, Corbett guest-starred on The Legend of Jesse James. Corbett also guest-starred in an episode of The Virginian, entitled "The Awakening", in which his character, David Henderson, is a destitute former minister who has had a crisis of faith and comes to Medicine Bow just as a dispute breaks out at a local mine over safety issues. He appeared as Chance Reynolds, a regular cast member on The Road West (1966–67). He guest-starred in the second season Star Trek episode "Metamorphosis" (1967) as Zefram Cochrane, inventor of the warp drive.

In 1971, Corbett had a guest appearance with Mariette Hartley on Gunsmoke (episode: "Phoenix"). In the 1970s, he had guest-starring roles on the television shows The Mod Squad, Cannon, The Streets of San Francisco, Police Woman, The Rockford Files, and Barnaby Jones.

In 1976, Corbett joined the cast of the NBC daytime soap opera The Doctors as Jason Aldrich, and stayed on the series until 1981. Throughout the 1980s, Corbett was a recurring guest star on the long-running television series Dallas as Paul Morgan from 1983 to 1984, and then from 1986 to 1988.

== Death ==
In January 1993, Corbett died of lung cancer at the Veterans Administration hospital in San Antonio, Texas, at the age of 59. He was buried in Fort Sam Houston National Cemetery, San Antonio.

== Selected TV and filmography ==
All the items listed are films on general release except as shown.

- Operation Petticoat (1959) as a Seaman
- The Crimson Kimono (1959) as Det. Sgt. Charlie Bancroft
- Man on a String (1960) as Frank Sanford
- The Mountain Road (1960) as Collins
- All the Young Men (1960) as Pvt. Wade, Medic
- Homicidal (1961) as Karl Anderson
- The Pirates of Blood River (1962) as Henry
- It's a Man's World (TV series, 1962–1963) as Wes Macauley
- Route 66 (TV series, 1963–1964) as Linc Case
- Gunsmoke (TV series, 1964–1974) as Hargraves / Phoenix / Dan Collins
- The Man from U.N.C.L.E. (TV series, 1965) as Bernie Oren
- Bonanza (TV series, 1965–1971) as Reverend Paul Watson/Howie Landis
- Shenandoah (1965) as Jacob Anderson
- The Virginian (TV series, 1965) as David Henderson in episode 1.06, "The Awakening"
- The Road West (TV series, 1966–1967) as Chance Reynolds
- Star Trek (TV series, 1967) as Zefram Cochrane
- Land of the Giants (TV series, 1968) as Major Kagan
- Guns in the Heather (1969) as Tom
- Chisum (1970) as Pat Garrett
- Big Jake (1971) as O'Brien
- Night Gallery (TV series, 1971) as Brenda's Father in "Brenda")
- Barnaby Jones (TV series, 1973) as Charlie Cort in "Divorce - Murderer's Style"
- Alias Smith and Jones (TV series, 1972) as Marty in episode 3.05, "Bushwhack!"
- Dead Pigeon on Beethoven Street (TV movie in German series Tatort, 1973) as Sandy
- The Stranger (TV movie, 1973) as Neil Stryker
- Movin' On (TV series, 1974) as Tommy Trueblood
- Police Story (TV series, 1974) as Detective Pruett in episode 2.03, "Robbery: 48 Hours"
- Nashville Girl (1976) as Jeb
- Midway (1976) as Lieutenant Commander John C. Waldron
- The Doctors (TV series, 1976–1982) as Jason Aldrich
- The Rockford Files (TV series, 1979) as FBI Agent Spelling in "The Battle-Ax and the Exploding Cigar"
- Stunts Unlimited (1980) as Dirk Macauley
- The Fall Guy (TV series, 1983) as Steve Kruger
- Dallas (TV series, 1983–1990) as Paul Morgan
- Shadow Force (1992) as Al Finch Sr. (final film role)
