= Jake Garber =

American make-up artist (born 1965)

- Born: April 16, 1965 (age 60); St. Paul, Minnesota, US
- Occupation: makeup artist
- Years active: 1989–present

Jake Garber (born April 16, 1965) is an American make-up artist who has done over 140 movies and television shows. For films he is most known for movies such as Star Trek: First Contact, Scream 3, Ghosts of Mars, Kill Bill, Hulk, Collateral, The Texas Chainsaw Massacre: The Beginning, The Hitcher, Grindhouse, The Mist, Inglourious Basterds, and Django Unchained (in which he also acted as a Candyland tracker). He has also done TV shows such as Fallout, Star Trek: Voyager, Firefly, The Walking Dead and The X-Files.

He was nominated at the 69th Academy Awards for his work on the film Star Trek: First Contact, which was in the category of Best Makeup. He shared his nomination with Michael Westmore and Scott Wheeler.

He also has won three Emmy awards.
