= 2014 Make-Up Artists & Hair Stylists Guild Awards =

2014 awards for make-up and hair in TV and film

- Date: February 14, 2015
- Site: Paramount Theatre
- Hosted by: Wendi McLendon-Covey
- Most wins: Film: The Grand Budapest Hotel and Guardians of the Galaxy (2); Television and New Media: Downton Abbey (2); Television miniseries and made for TV movies: American Horror Story: Freak Show (3)
- Most nominations: Film: Guardians of the Galaxy and Into the Woods (3); Television miniseries and made for TV movies: Fargo (TV series) (4)

The 2014 Make-Up Artists and Hair Stylists Guild Awards, presented by the Make-Up Artists and Hair Stylists Guild to honor the best make-up and hairstyling in film and American and British television, were held on February 14, 2015 at Paramount Theatre. Wendi McLendon-Covey hosted the event, with Sarah Paulson, Jamie Brewer, Darby Stanchfield, Alfre Woodard, Lorraine Toussaint, Jillian Rose Reed, Lauren Cohan, Tony Revolori, Ethan Embry, Raymond Cruz, Amy Landecker, and Beau Garrett presenting the awards.

Nominees were announced on Thursday, January 8, 2015 with the most nominations in the feature film categories going to Guardians of the Galaxy and Into the Woods; each received three nominations.

John Landis presented make-up artist Rick Baker a lifetime achievement award, with Cheryl Boone Isaacs presenting a lifetime achievement award to hair-stylist Kathryn Blondell. Ron Perlman presented the Distinguished Artisan Award to director Guillermo del Toro.

== Winners and nominees ==
The winners are listed first and in bold.

=== Feature-Length Motion Picture ===
**Best Contemporary Make-Up**	**Best Contemporary Hair Styling**
**Guardians of the Galaxy** – **Elizabeth Yianni-Georgiou**; Captain America: The Winter Soldier – Allan Apone, Nicole Sortillon and Lisa Rocco; Gone Girl – Kate Biscoe and Gigi Williams; Interstellar – Luisa Abel and Jay Wejebe; Nightcrawler – Donald Mowat and Malanie Romero	**Birdman** – **Jerry Popolis** and **Kat Drazen**; Guardians of the Galaxy – Elizabeth Yianni-Georgiou; Interstellar – Patricia Dehaney and Jose L. Zamora; St. Vincent – Suzy Mazzarese-Allison; Winter's Tale – Alan D'Angerio and Jasen Sica
**Best Period and/or Character Make-Up**	**Best Period Hair Styling and/or Character Hair Styling**
**The Grand Budapest Hotel** – **Frances Hannon** and **Julie Dartnell**; The Hunger Games: Mockingjay – Part 1 – Ve Neill, Nikoletta Skarlatos and Conor McCullagh; Into the Woods – Peter Swords King; The Theory of Everything – Jan Sewell and Lesley Smith; Unbroken – Toni Garavaglia and Nik Dorning	**The Grand Budapest Hotel** – **Frances Hannon** and **Julie Dartnell**; Get On Up – Carla Farmer and Shannon Bakeman; Into the Woods – Peter Swords King; Selma – Melissa Forney and Pierce Austin; The Theory of Everything – Jan Sewell and Lesley Smith
**Best Special Make-Up Effects**
**Guardians of the Galaxy** – **David White**; Foxcatcher – Bill Corso and Dennis Liddiard; Into the Woods – J. Roy Helland and Matthew Smith; Maleficent – Rick Baker, Toni Garavaglia and Arjen Tuiten; The Hobbit: The Battle of the Five Armies – Gino Acevedos

=== Television and New Media Series ===
**Best Contemporary Make-Up**	**Best Contemporary Hair Styling**
**Sons of Anarchy** – **Tracey Anderson**, **Michelle Garbin** and **Sabine Roller Taylor**; Dancing with the Stars – Zena Shteysel, Angela Moos and Patti Ramsey Bortoli; House of Cards – Tricia Sawyer and Vasilios Tanis; Orange Is the New Black – Michal Bigger and Karen Reuter; True Detective – Felicity Bowring and Linda Dowds; The Walking Dead – Essie Cha, Mayumi Murakami and Chauntelle Langston	**Dancing with the Stars** – **Mary Guerrero**, **Kimi Messina** and **Jennifer Guerrero-Mazursky**; House of Cards – Sean Flanigan and Shunika Terry; Orange Is the New Black – Angel De Angelis and Valerie Velez; Pretty Little Liars – Kim M. Ferry and Shari Perry; The Voice – Shawn Finch, Jerilynn Stephens and Cheryl Marks
**Best Period and/or Character Make-Up**	**Best Period and/or Character Hair Styling**
**Downton Abbey** – **Magi Vaughan** and **Erika Ökvist**; Boardwalk Empire – Michele Paris and Joe Farulla; Key & Peele – Scott Wheeler and Suzanne Diaz; Mad Men – Lana Horochowski and Ron Pipes; Masters of Sex season 2 – Jean Ann Black	**Downton Abbey** – **Magi Vaughan** and **Adam James Phillips**; Key & Peele – Amanda Mofield and Raissa Patton; Mad Men – Theraesa Rivers and Arturo Rojas; Masters of Sex season 2 – Kathrine Gordon, Darlene Brumfield and Candy Neal; True Detective – Anne Morgan, Rita Parillo and Melizah Anguiano
**Best Special Make-Up Effects**
**The Walking Dead** – **Greg Nicotero** and **Jake Garber**; Boardwalk Empire – Michele Paris and Joe Farulla; Grimm – Barney Burman and Michael Smithson; Sleepy Hollow – Leo Corey Castellano and Mark Nieman; Sons of Anarchy – Tracey Anderson, Carlton Coleman and Margie Kaklamanos

=== Television Miniseries or Motion Picture Made for Television ===
**Best Contemporary Make-Up**	**Best Contemporary Hair Styling**
**Fargo** – **Gail Kennedy** and **Joanne Preece**; Reckless – Jeanne Van Phue, Gigi Collins and Ashleigh Chavis; Sherlock – Claire Pritchard-Jones and Sarah Astley-Hughes	**Sherlock** – **Claire Pritchard-Jones** and **Sarah Astley-Hughes**; Fargo – Gail Kennedy and Joanne Preece; Reckless – Jeanne Van Phue and Gigi Collins
**Best Period and/or Character Make-Up**	**Best Period and/or Character Hair Styling**
**American Horror Story: Freak Show** – **Eryn Krueger Mekash** and **Kim Ayers**; Fargo – Chris Glimsdale and Keith Sayer; Houdini – Gregor Eckstein; The Normal Heart – Eryn Krueger Mekash and Sherri Laurence; Olive Kitteridge – Christien Tinsley, Gerald Quist and Liz Bernstrom	**American Horror Story: Freak Show** – **Monte C. Haught** and **Michelle Ceglia**; Houdini – Gregor Eckstein; The Knick – Jerry Decarlo and Rose Chatterton; The Normal Heart – Chris Clark and Joe Whitmeyer; Olive Kitteridge – Cydney Cornell
**Best Special Make-Up Effects**
**American Horror Story: Freak Show** – **Eryn Krueger Mekash**, **Michael Mekash** and **Christopher Nelson**; Fargo – Gail Kennedy, David Trainor and Gunther Schetterer; Houdini – Gregor Eckstein; The Knick – Justin Raleigh; Olive Kitteridge – Christien Tinsley, Gerald Quist and Hiroshi Yada

=== Commercials and Music Videos ===
**Best Make-Up**	**Best Hair Styling**
**DirecTV** – **Scott Stoddard** and **Michael Ornelaz**; "2015 Audi A8" – Deborah Rutherford and Don Rutherford; American Horror Story: Freak Show: "Promo" – Kerry Herta; One Direction – David Abbott and Shawn Blair; "Weird Al" Yankovic: "Handy" – Sean James Cummins	**Progressive Commercial** – **Dian Bethune Coble**; Dodge Commercial – Judd Minter and Connie Kallos

=== Theatrical Productions (Live Stage) ===
**Best Make-Up**	**Best Hair Styling**
**Kinky Boots** – **Sarah B. Wolfe**; Così fan tutte – Vanessa Dionne, Rheanne Garcia and Mario Duran; La traviata – Darren K. Jinks and Brandi Strona	**Motown The Musical, National Tour** – **Brandon Bolton**; Così fan tutte – Vanessa Dionne, Cassandra Russek and Rheanne Garcia; La traviata – Darren K. Jinks and Linda Cardenas; Madama Butterfly – Gerd M. Mairandres; Show Boat – Gerd M. Mairandres

=== Honorary Awards ===
- Distinguished Artisan Award: Guillermo del Toro
- Lifetime Achievement Award, Hair Stylist: Kathryn Blondell
- Lifetime Achievement Award, Make-Up: Rick Baker
