= Make-Up Artists & Hair Stylists Guild Award for Best Period and/or Character Make-Up in a Feature-Length Motion Picture =

Make-Up Artists and Hair Stylists Guild Award for Best Period and/or Character Make-Up in a Feature-Length Motion Picture
- Country: United States
- Presented by: Make-Up Artists and Hair Stylists Guild (MUAHS)
- First award: 2013
- Currently held by: Guy Common, Naomi Donne, Nadia Stacey; Cruella (2021)
- Website: Make-Up Artists & Hair Stylists Guild

The Make-Up Artists and Hair Stylists Guild Award for Best Period and/or Character Make-Up in a Feature-Length Motion Picture is one of the awards given annually to people working in the motion picture industry by the Make-Up Artists and Hair Stylists Guild (MUAHS). It is presented to the makeup artists whose work has been deemed "best" in a given year, within a period-set film, and/or for specific character makeup. The award was first given in 2014, during the sixth annual awards. For the first five ceremonies, the period and character aspects of the category were separated, and awarded individually.

== Winners and nominees ==
=== 1990s ===
Best Character Makeup - Feature

Year	Film	Nominees
(1999); 1st
(1999); 1st	Sleepy Hollow	Kevin Yagher, Peter Owen, Elizabeth Tag, Paul Gooch
(1999); 1st	Bicentennial Man	Cheri Minns
(1999); 1st	Man on the Moon	Sheryl Ptak

Best Period Makeup - Feature

Year	Film	Nominees
(1999); 1st
(1999); 1st	Tea with Mussolini	Leonard Engelman
(1999); 1st	Austin Powers: The Spy Who Shagged Me	Patty York, Cheryl Ann Nick, Michèle Burke, Steve Artmont
(1999); 1st	A Midsummer Night's Dream	Ronnie Specter

=== 2000s ===
Best Character Makeup - Feature

Year	Film	Nominees
(2001); 3rd
(2001); 3rd	The Royal Tenenbaums	Naomi Donne, Kate Biscoe
(2001); 3rd	Life as a House	Christina Smith, Bonita DeHaven, Tammy Ashmore
(2001); 3rd	Mulholland Drive	Julie Pearce, Randy Westgate, Selina Jayne
(2002); 4th
(2002); 4th	The Lord of the Rings: The Two Towers (Frodo Baggins)	Peter King, Peter Owen
(2002); 4th	The Master of Disguise (Pistachio Disguisey)	Kevin Yagher, Michelle Vittone
(2002); 4th	Red Dragon (Francis Dolarhyde)	Julie Pearce, Randy Westgate, Matthew W. Mungle, Ken Diaz
(2003); 5th
(2003); 5th	The Lord of the Rings: The Return of the King	Peter King, Peter Owen
(2003); 5th	The Cat in the Hat	Melanie Hughes, Amy L. Disarro, René Dashiell Kerby
(2003); 5th	Pirates of the Caribbean: The Curse of the Black Pearl	Ve Neill, Joel Harlow

Best Period Makeup - Feature

Year	Film	Nominees
(2000); 2nd
(2000); 2nd	The Patriot	Thomas Nellen, Wendy Bell, Patty York, Anita Brabec
(2000); 2nd	Almost Famous	Lois Burwell
(2000); 2nd	The Legend of Bagger Vance	
(2001); 3rd
(2001); 3rd	Moulin Rouge!	Maurizio Silvi, Vincenzo Mastrantonio, Lesley Vanderwalt
(2001); 3rd	Ali	Judy Murdock (personal)
(2001); 3rd	The Majestic	Bill Corso, Douglas Noe, Judy Mathai
(2002); 4th
(2002); 4th	Chicago	Jordan Samuel, Patricia Keighran, Edelgard K. Pfluegl
(2002); 4th	Frida	Judy Chin, Maryann Marchetti, John E. Jackson
(2002); 4th	Road to Perdition	Daniel C. Striepeke, Ron Snyder
(2003); 5th
(2003); 5th	Pirates of the Caribbean: The Curse of the Black Pearl	Ve Neill, Joel Harlow, Douglas Noe, David DeLeon, Ken Diaz, David Dupuis, Deborah Rutherford, Jene Fielder
(2003); 5th	The Last Samurai	Lois Burwell, Margaret E. Elliott, Tina Harrelson
(2003); 5th	Seabiscuit	Thomas Nellen, Lydia Milars, Martina Kohl

=== 2010s ===
Best Period and/or Character Makeup - Feature Films

Year	Film	Nominees
(2013); 6th
(2013); 6th	Dallas Buyers Club	Robin Mathews
(2013); 6th	The Great Gatsby	Maurizio Silvi, Lesley Vanderwalt
(2013); 6th	The Lone Ranger	Joel Harlow, Mike Smithson, Robin Beauchesne
(2014); 7th
(2014); 7th	The Grand Budapest Hotel	Frances Hannon, Julie Dartnell
(2014); 7th	The Hunger Games: Mockingjay – Part 1	Ve Neill, Nikoletta Skarlatos, Conor McCullagh
(2014); 7th	Into the Woods	Peter King
(2014); 7th	The Theory of Everything	Jan Sewell, Lesley Smith
(2014); 7th	Unbroken	Toni G, Arjen Tuiten

Best Period and/or Character Make-Up in a Feature-Length Motion Picture

Year	Film	Nominees
(2015); 8th
(2015); 8th	Mad Max: Fury Road	Lesley Vanderwalt, Nadine Prigge, Ailie Smith
(2015); 8th	Brooklyn	Morna Ferguson, Niamh O'Loan, Marlène Rouleau
(2015); 8th	Carol	Patricia Regan
(2015); 8th	Cinderella	Naomi Donne, Norma Webb
(2015); 8th	The Danish Girl	Jan Sewell, Renata Gilbert
(2016); 9th
(2016); 9th	Suicide Squad	Alessandro Bertolazzi
(2016); 9th	Doctor Strange	Jeremy Woodhead
(2016); 9th	Fantastic Beasts and Where to Find Them	Fae Hammond, Marilyn MacDonald
(2016); 9th	Hail, Caesar!	Jean Ann Black, Julie Hewett, Zoe Hay
(2016); 9th	Loving	Julia Lallas, Katie Middleton
(2017); 10th
(2017); 10th	Darkest Hour	Ivana Primorac, Flora Moody
(2017); 10th	Blade Runner 2049	Donald Mowat, Jo-Ann MacNeil, Csilla Blake-Horváth
(2017); 10th	Bright	Alessandro Bertolazzi, Cristina Waltz, Judy Murdock
(2017); 10th	The Greatest Showman	Nicki Ledermann, Tania Ribalow, Sunday Englis
(2017); 10th	I, Tonya	Deborah La Mia Denaver, Teresa Vest, Bill Myer
(2018); 11th
(2018); 11th	Vice	Kate Biscoe, Ann Pala Williams, Jamie Kelman
(2018); 11th	Bohemian Rhapsody	Jan Sewell, Mark Coulier
(2018); 11th	Mary Poppins Returns	Peter Robb-King, Paula Price
(2018); 11th	Mary Queen of Scots	Jenny Shircore, Hannah Edwards, Sarah Kelly
(2018); 11th	Stan & Ollie	Jeremy Woodhead, Mark Coulier
(2019); 12th
(2019); 12th	Joker	Nicki Ledermann, Tania Ribalow, Sunday Englis
(2019); 12th	Dolemite Is My Name	Vera Steimberg, Debra Denson, Deborah Humphries
(2019); 12th	Downton Abbey	Anne Oldham, Elaine Browne, Sam Smart
(2019); 12th	Once Upon a Time ... in Hollywood	Heba Thorisdottir, Greg Funk
(2019); 12th	Rocketman	Elizabeth Yianni-Georgiou, Tapio Salmi, Laura Solari

=== 2020s ===
Year	Film	Nominees
(2020); 13th
(2020); 13th	Ma Rainey’s Black Bottom	Matiki Anoff, Sergio López-Rivera, Carl Fullerton, Debi Young
(2020); 13th	Bill & Ted Face the Music	Bill Corso, Dennis Liddiard, Stephen Kelley, Bianca Appice
(2020); 13th	Hillbilly Elegy	Eryn Krueger Mekash, Jamie Hess, Devin Morales, Jessica Gambardella
(2020); 13th	Mank	Gigi Williams, Michelle Audrina Kim
(2020); 13th	Mulan	Denise Kum, Rick Findlater, Georgia Lockhart-Adams, James MacKinnon
(2021); 14th
(2021); 14th	Cruella	Guy Common, Naomi Donne, Nadia Stacey
(2021); 14th	Being the Ricardos	David Craig Forrest, Ana Lozano, Kyra Panchenko, Denise Paulson
(2021); 14th	Dune	Rocky Faulkner, Jo-Ann MacNeil, Donald Mowat, Jennifer Stanfield
(2021); 14th	The Eyes of Tammy Faye	Ashleigh Chavis-Wolfe, Linda Dowds, Renee Goodwin
(2021); 14th	House of Gucci	Jana Carboni, Daniel Lawson Johnston, Stefania Pellegini, Sarah Tanno
(2022); 15th	Elvis	Shane Thomas, Angela Conte
(2022); 15th	Amsterdam	Nana Fischer, Miho Suzuki, Jason Collins
(2022); 15th	Babylon	Heba Thorisdottir, Shaunna Bren Chavez, Jean Black, Mandy Artusato
(2022); 15th	Blonde	Tina Roesler Kerwin, Elena Arroy, Cassie Lyons
(2022); 15th	Till	Denise Tunnell, Janice Tunnell, Ashley Langston
(2023); 16th	Maestro	Siân Grigg, Jackie Risotto, Elisa Tallerico, Nicky Pattison-Illum
(2023); 16th	Barbie	Ivana Primorac, Victoria Down, Maha Mimo
(2023); 16th	Guardians of the Galaxy Vol. 3	Alexei Dmitriew, Nicole Sortillon, Amos Samantha Ward, LuAndra Whitehurs
(2023); 16th	Oppenheimer	Luisa Abel, Jason Hamer, Kerrin Jackson, Jamie Loree Hess
(2023); 16th	Poor Things	Nadia Stacey
(2024); 17th	Wicked	Frances Hannon, Alice Jones, Nuria Mbomio, Johanna Nielsen, Branka Vorkapic
(2024); 17th	Beetlejuice Beetlejuice	Christine Blundell, Lesa Warrener, Charmaine Fuller, Mona Turnbull, Chloe Meddings
(2024); 17th	Deadpool & Wolverine	Bill Corso, Whitney James, Paula Price, Monica Huppert, Cyndi Reece-Thorne
(2024); 17th	Gladiator II	Jana Carboni, Charlie Hounslow, Maria Solberg Lepre, Lauren Baldwin, Chantal Busuttil
(2024); 17th	MaXXXine	Sarah Rubano, Mandy Artusato, Akiko Matsumoto
(2025); 18th	Sinners	Ken Diaz, Siân Richards, Ned Neidhardt, Allison laCour, Lana Mora
(2025); 18th	Frankenstein	Jordan Samuel, Oriana Rossi, Kristin Wayne, Patricia Keighran, Lizzi Lawson Zeiss
(2025); 18th	The Smashing Machine	Felix Fox, Darah Wyant, Amanda Imeson, Harlow MacFarlane, Maiko Gomyo
(2025); 18th	Weapons	Leo Satkovich, Mark Ross, Jason Collins, Kaylee Kehne-Swisher, Brie Bastianson
(2025); 18th	Wicked: For Good	Frances Hannon, Alice Jones, Nuria Mbomio, Sarah Nuth
