= List of accolades received by Oppenheimer (film) =

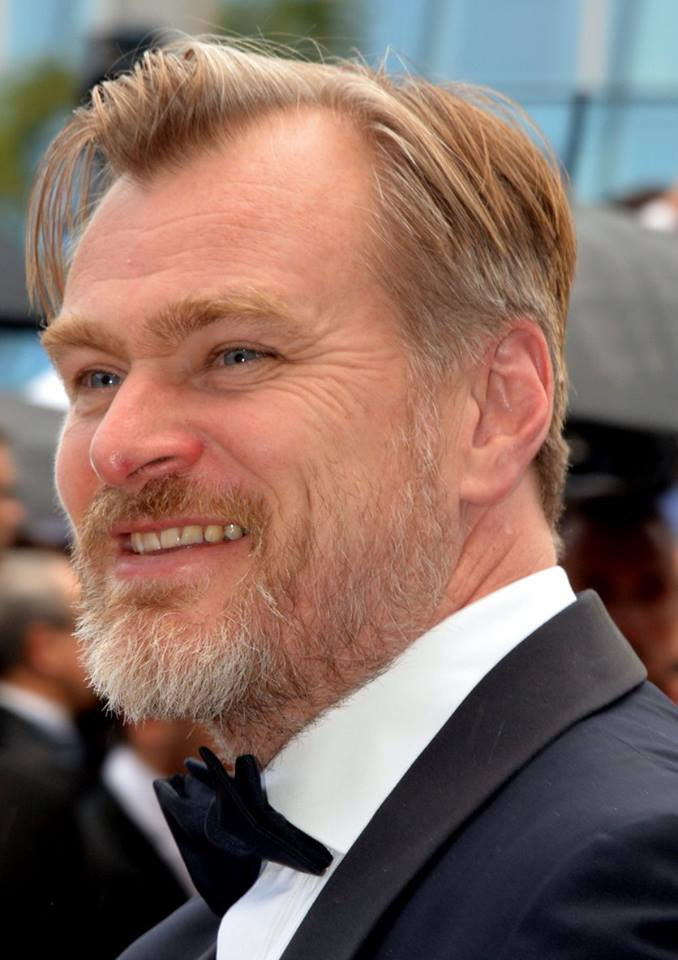
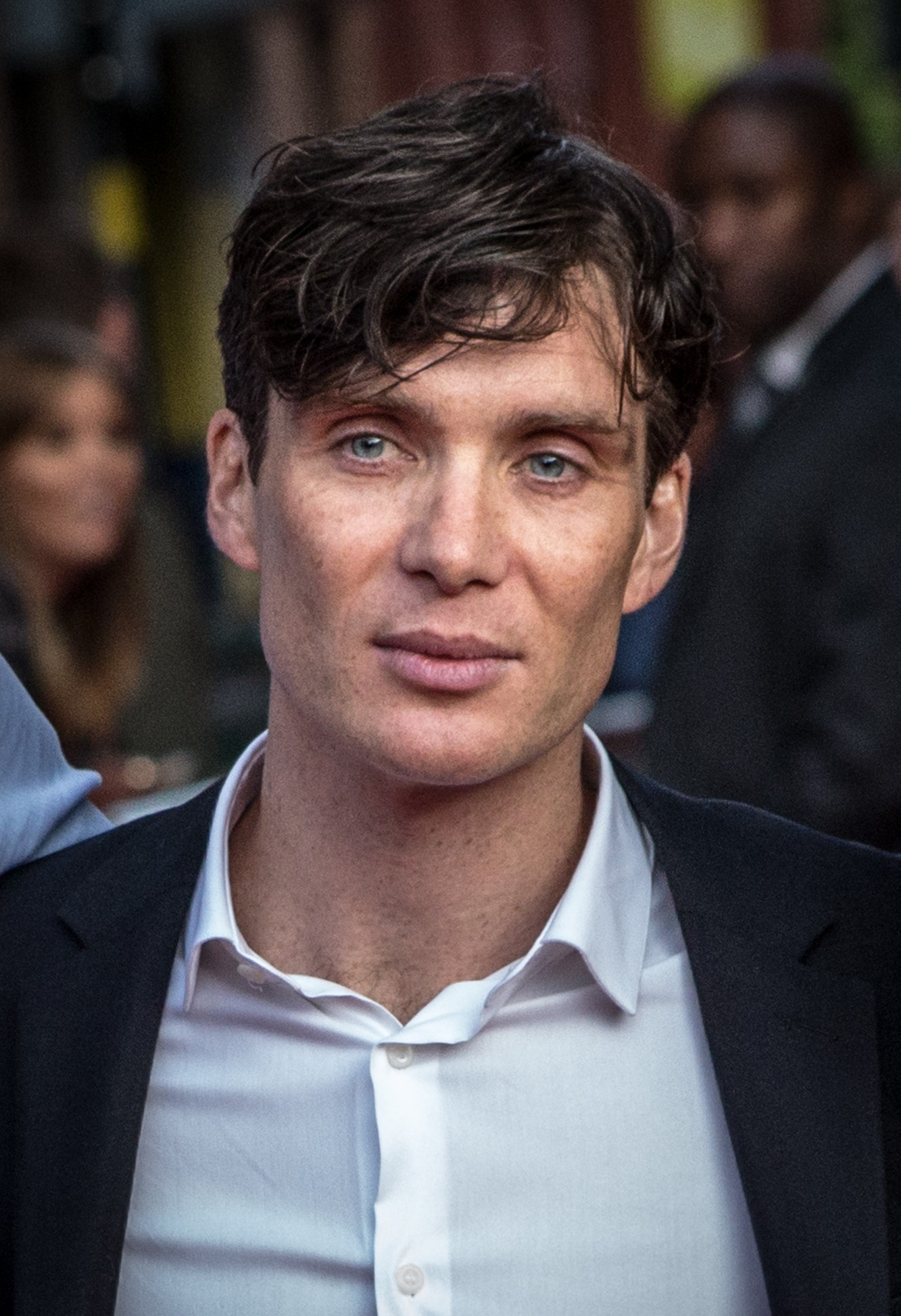
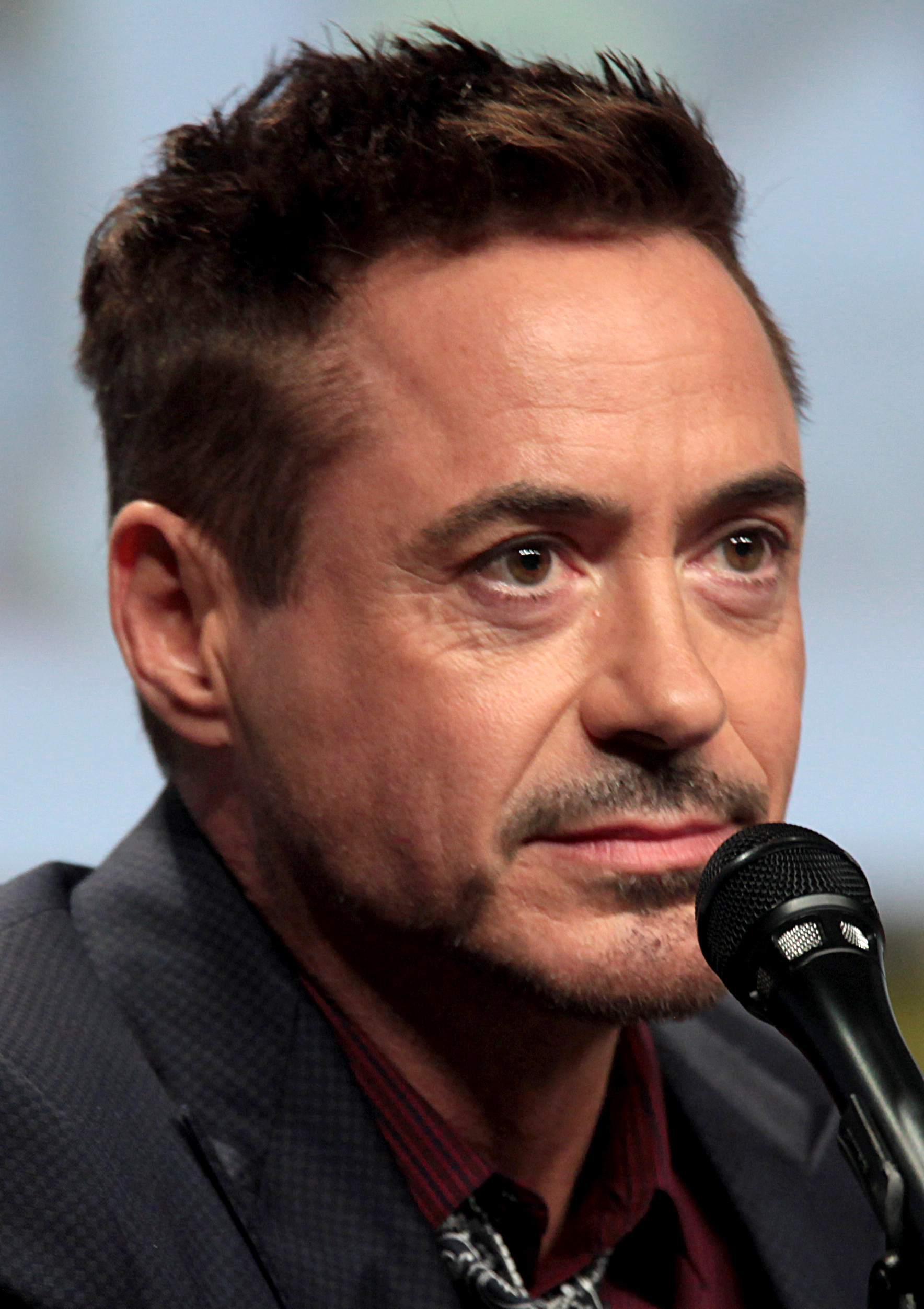
- Christopher Nolan received several accolades for his direction, screenplay, and producing, as did Cillian Murphy and Robert Downey Jr. for their performances.
Awards and nominations
Award	Wins	Nominations
AACTA International Awards	2	6
AARP Movies for Grownups Awards	1	6
Academy Awards	7	13
Advanced Imaging Society Awards	1	1
African-American Film Critics Association Awards	1	1
Alliance of Women Film Journalists EDA Awards	1	8
Amanda Awards	0	1
American Cinematheque	2	2
American Cinema Editors Eddie Awards	1	1
American Film Institute Awards	1	1
American Society of Cinematographers Awards	1	1
Art Directors Guild Awards	1	1
Astra Creative Arts Awards	3	8
Astra Film Awards	1	6
Artios Awards	0	1
Austin Film Critics Association Awards	9	10
Bodil Awards	0	1
Boston Society of Film Critics Awards	4	4
British Academy Film Awards	7	13
British Film Editors Cut Above Awards	1	1
British Society of Cinematographers Awards	0	1
Capri Hollywood International Film Festival Awards	7	7
César Awards	0	1
Chicago Film Critics Association Awards	3	10
Cinema Audio Society Awards	1	1
Cinema for Peace Awards	0	1
Costume Designers Guild Awards	0	1
Critics' Choice Movie Awards	8	13
Dallas–Fort Worth Film Critics Association Awards	7	7
David di Donatello Awards	0	1
Directors Guild of America Awards	1	1
Dorian Awards	0	5
Dublin Film Critics' Circle Awards	4	4
Edda Awards	0	1
Federation of American Scientists	1	1
Florida Film Critics Circle Awards	5	10
Georgia Film Critics Association Awards	9	10
Golden Globe Awards	5	8
Golden Reel Awards	2	3
Golden Rooster Awards	1	1
Golden Trailer Awards	3	7
Grammy Awards	1	3
Heartland International Film Festival Awards	1	1
Hollywood Music in Media Awards	0	1
Hollywood Professional Association Awards	2	2
Houston Film Critics Society Awards	2	9
ICG Publicsts Award	0	1
IndieWire Critics Poll	5	5
International Cinephile Society Awards	0	2
International Film Music Critics Association Awards	1	3
Irish Film & Television Awards	2	3
Kansas City Film Critics Circle Awards	6	6
Location Managers Guild International Awards	1	2
London Film Critics' Circle Awards	0	7
Los Angeles Film Critics Association Awards	1	1
Make-Up Artists and Hair Stylists Guild Awards	0	1
National Board of Review Awards	1	1
National Society of Film Critics Awards	5	5
New York Film Critics Circle Awards	2	2
New York Film Critics Online Awards	5	5
Online Film Critics Society Awards	8	12
Palm Springs International Film Festival Awards	1	1
People's Choice Awards	1	6
Producers Guild of America Awards	1	1
Robert Awards	1	1
Santa Barbara International Film Festival Awards	1	1
San Diego Film Critics Society Awards	6	12
San Francisco Bay Area Film Critics Circle Awards	3	10
Sant Jordi Awards	1	1
Satellite Awards	4	14
Saturn Awards	4	12
SCAD Savannah Film Festival	1	1
Seattle Film Critics Society Awards	2	9
Screen Actors Guild Awards	3	4
Set Decorators Society of America Awards	0	1
Society of Composers & Lyricists Awards	1	1
St. Louis Film Critics Association Awards	10	14
Toronto Film Critics Association Awards	1	1
Turkish Film Critics Association Awards	1	1
USC Scripter Awards	0	1
Vancouver Film Critics Circle Awards	2	6
Visual Effects Society Awards	1	2
Washington D.C. Area Film Critics Association Awards	6	11
Women Film Critics Circle Awards	1	1
Writers Guild of America Awards	0	1

Totals (Note: Certain award groups do not simply award one winner. They acknowledge several different recipients, have runners-up, and have third place. Since this is a specific recognition and is different from losing an award, runner-up mentions are considered wins in this award tally. For simplification and to avoid errors, each award in this list has been presumed to have had a prior nomination.)
- Wins: 194
- Nominations: 305

Oppenheimer is a 2023 epic biographical thriller film (Note: Primary genres attributed to the following sources:) written and directed by Christopher Nolan, who co-produced it with Emma Thomas and Charles Roven. Based on the 2005 biography American Prometheus by Kai Bird and Martin J. Sherwin, it chronicles the career of American theoretical physicist J. Robert Oppenheimer, from his studies to his direction of the Los Alamos Laboratory, during World War II, and the 1954 security hearing that resulted in his political fall from grace. The film stars Cillian Murphy as the titular character with an ensemble supporting cast including Emily Blunt, Matt Damon, Robert Downey Jr., Florence Pugh, Josh Hartnett, Casey Affleck, Rami Malek, and Kenneth Branagh.

Oppenheimer had its world premiere at Le Grand Rex in Paris on July 11, 2023, followed by the British premiere at Odeon Luxe Leicester Square in London on July 13, and the American premiere at AMC Lincoln Square 13 in New York City on July 17. The film was released theatrically in the United States, the United Kingdom, and most other countries on July 21 by Universal Pictures. Its concurrent release with Warner Bros's Barbie was the catalyst for the "Barbenheimer" phenomenon, encouraging audiences to see both films as a double feature. In Japan, the film did not get released until March 29, 2024, after getting picked up by Japanese distributor Bitters End in December 2023. (Note: Though it is not uncommon for American movies to be released in Japan later than in North America, there was uncertainty as to whether Oppenheimer would get a release date at all, with news outlets noting the sensitive nature of the film's subject matter due to the atomic bombings of Hiroshima and Nagasaki. Toho-Towa, the largest distributor of Hollywood films in Japan, opted not to release Oppenheimer and Bitters End only decided to do so "following months of thoughtful dialogue associated with the subject matter and acknowledging the particular sensitivity for us Japanese", which also took into account backlash against the Barbenheimer phenomenon.) Produced on a budget of $100 million, Oppenheimer grossed $975 million worldwide, going on to become the third-highest-grossing film of 2023, the highest-grossing biographical film of all time, the highest-grossing World War II-related film of all time, and the then second-highest-grossing R-rated film of all time, behind Joker. Oppenheimer received widespread critical acclaim, (Note: Attributed to multiple sources:) with particular praise for its screenplay, performances and production values. (Note: Attributed to multiple sources:) On the review aggregator website Rotten Tomatoes, the film holds an approval rating of 93% based on 513 reviews, making it the platform's best-reviewed movie of 2023.

Oppenheimer garnered awards and nominations from a wide assortment of categories, with recognition for its direction, screenplay, performances (particularly those of Murphy and Downey Jr.), Ludwig Göransson's musical score, Hoyte van Hoytema's cinematography, and Jennifer Lame's editing. At the 96th Academy Awards, the film received thirteen nominations, surpassing eight nominations each received by The Dark Knight, Inception, and Dunkirk to become Nolan's most Oscar-nominated film, winning seven: Best Picture, Best Director (Nolan), Best Actor (Murphy), Best Supporting Actor (Downey Jr.), Best Film Editing, Best Cinematography, and Best Original Score. Oppenheimer received another thirteen nominations at the 29th Critics' Choice Awards, winning eight, including Best Director (Nolan), Best Supporting Actor (Downey Jr.), and Best Score. The film won seven awards from thirteen nominations at the 77th British Academy Film Awards, including Best Film and Best Direction (Nolan). With his win for Best Actor, Murphy became the first Irish-born performer to receive an Oscar and a BAFTA in a leading category. The film received eight nominations at the 81st Golden Globe Awards, winning Best Motion Picture – Drama, Best Director (Nolan), Best Actor in a Motion Picture – Drama (Murphy), Best Supporting Actor – Motion Picture (Downey Jr.) and Best Original Score. Both the National Board of Review and the American Film Institute named Oppenheimer one of the Top Ten Films of 2023.

== Accolades ==
Accolades received by Oppenheimer (film)
Award	Date of ceremony	Category	Recipient(s)	Result	Ref(s).
AACTA International Awards	February 10, 2024	Best Film	Oppenheimer	Nominated	
AACTA International Awards	February 10, 2024	Best Direction	Christopher Nolan	Won	
AACTA International Awards	February 10, 2024	Best Actor	Cillian Murphy	Won	
AACTA International Awards	February 10, 2024	Best Supporting Actor	Matt Damon	Nominated	
AACTA International Awards	February 10, 2024	Best Supporting Actor	Robert Downey Jr.	Nominated	
AACTA International Awards	February 10, 2024	Best Screenplay	Christopher Nolan	Nominated	
AARP Movies for Grownups Awards	January 17, 2024	Best Picture/Best Movie for Grownups	Oppenheimer	Nominated	
AARP Movies for Grownups Awards	January 17, 2024	Best Time Capsule	Oppenheimer	Nominated	
AARP Movies for Grownups Awards	January 17, 2024	Best Ensemble	Oppenheimer	Nominated	
AARP Movies for Grownups Awards	January 17, 2024	Best Director	Christopher Nolan	Won	
AARP Movies for Grownups Awards	January 17, 2024	Best Screenwriter	Christopher Nolan	Nominated	
AARP Movies for Grownups Awards	January 17, 2024	Best Supporting Actor	Robert Downey Jr.	Nominated	
Academy Awards	March 10, 2024	Best Picture	Emma Thomas, Charles Roven and Christopher Nolan	Won	
Academy Awards	March 10, 2024	Best Director	Christopher Nolan	Won	
Academy Awards	March 10, 2024	Best Actor	Cillian Murphy	Won	
Academy Awards	March 10, 2024	Best Supporting Actor	Robert Downey Jr.	Won	
Academy Awards	March 10, 2024	Best Supporting Actress	Emily Blunt	Nominated	
Academy Awards	March 10, 2024	Best Adapted Screenplay	Christopher Nolan	Nominated	
Academy Awards	March 10, 2024	Best Cinematography	Hoyte van Hoytema	Won	
Academy Awards	March 10, 2024	Best Costume Design	Ellen Mirojnick	Nominated	
Academy Awards	March 10, 2024	Best Film Editing	Jennifer Lame	Won	
Academy Awards	March 10, 2024	Best Makeup and Hairstyling	Luisa Abel	Nominated	
Academy Awards	March 10, 2024	Best Original Score	Ludwig Göransson	Won	
Academy Awards	March 10, 2024	Best Production Design	Ruth De Jong and Claire Kaufman	Nominated	
Academy Awards	March 10, 2024	Best Sound	Willie D. Burton, Richard King, Gary A. Rizzo and Kevin O'Connell	Nominated	
Advanced Imaging Society Awards	February 9, 2024	Best Feature Film – Live Action	Oppenheimer	Won	
African-American Film Critics Association Awards	January 15, 2024	Top 10 Films of the Year	Oppenheimer	4th Place	
Alliance of Women Film Journalists EDA Awards	January 3, 2024	Best Film	Oppenheimer	Nominated	
Alliance of Women Film Journalists EDA Awards	January 3, 2024	Best Actor	Cillian Murphy	Nominated	
Alliance of Women Film Journalists EDA Awards	January 3, 2024	Best Actor, Supporting	Robert Downey Jr.	Nominated	
Alliance of Women Film Journalists EDA Awards	January 3, 2024	Best Ensemble Cast – Casting Director	John Papsidera	Nominated	
Alliance of Women Film Journalists EDA Awards	January 3, 2024	Best Screenplay, Adapted	Christopher Nolan	Nominated	
Alliance of Women Film Journalists EDA Awards	January 3, 2024	Best Cinematography	Hoyte van Hoytema	Nominated	
Alliance of Women Film Journalists EDA Awards	January 3, 2024	Best Editing	Jennifer Lame	Nominated	
Alliance of Women Film Journalists EDA Awards	January 3, 2024	Most Egregious Lovers' Age Difference Award (Special Mention)	Cillian Murphy and Florence Pugh	Won	
American Cinema Editors Eddie Awards	March 3, 2024	Best Edited Feature Film – Dramatic	Jennifer Lame	Won	
Amanda Awards	August 23, 2024	Best Foreign Feature Film	Oppenheimer	Nominated	
American Cinematheque	January 19, 2024	Achievement in Cinematography – Feature Film	Hoyte van Hoytema	Won	
American Cinematheque	January 19, 2024	Achievement in Editing – Feature Film	Jennifer Lame	Won	
American Film Institute Awards	December 7, 2023	Top 10 Films of the Year	Oppenheimer	Won (Note: This award does not have a single winner, but recognizes multiple films.)	
American Society of Cinematographers Awards	March 3, 2024	Outstanding Achievement in Cinematography in Theatrical Releases	Hoyte van Hoytema	Won	
Art Directors Guild Awards	February 10, 2024	Excellence in Production Design for a Period Film	Ruth De Jong	Won	
Artios Awards	March 7, 2024	Outstanding Achievement in Casting – Big Budget Feature (Drama)	John Papsidera	Nominated	
The Astra Awards	January 6, 2024	Best Picture	Oppenheimer	Nominated	
The Astra Awards	January 6, 2024	Best Director	Christopher Nolan	Won	
The Astra Awards	January 6, 2024	Best Actor	Cillian Murphy	Nominated	
The Astra Awards	January 6, 2024	Best Supporting Actor	Robert Downey Jr.	Nominated	
The Astra Awards	January 6, 2024	Best Cast Ensemble	Oppenheimer	Nominated	
The Astra Awards	January 6, 2024	Best Adapted Screenplay	Christopher Nolan	Nominated	
The Astra Awards	February 26, 2024	Best Casting Director	John Papsidera	Nominated	
The Astra Awards	February 26, 2024	Best Cinematography	Hoyte van Hoytema	Won	
The Astra Awards	February 26, 2024	Best Production Design	Ruth De Jong	Nominated	
The Astra Awards	February 26, 2024	Best Editing	Jennifer Lame	Nominated	
The Astra Awards	February 26, 2024	Best Score	Ludwig Göransson	Won	
The Astra Awards	February 26, 2024	Best Sound	Oppenheimer	Won	
The Astra Awards	February 26, 2024	Best Visual Effects	Oppenheimer	Nominated	
The Astra Awards	February 26, 2024	Best Publicity Campaign	Oppenheimer	Nominated	
Austin Film Critics Association Awards	January 10, 2024	Best Film	Oppenheimer	Runner-up	
Austin Film Critics Association Awards	January 10, 2024	Best Director	Christopher Nolan	Won	
Austin Film Critics Association Awards	January 10, 2024	Best Actor	Cillian Murphy	Won	
Austin Film Critics Association Awards	January 10, 2024	Best Supporting Actor	Robert Downey Jr.	Won	
Austin Film Critics Association Awards	January 10, 2024	Best Supporting Actress	Emily Blunt	Nominated	
Austin Film Critics Association Awards	January 10, 2024	Best Ensemble	Oppenheimer	Won	
Austin Film Critics Association Awards	January 10, 2024	Best Adapted Screenplay	Christopher Nolan	Won	
Austin Film Critics Association Awards	January 10, 2024	Best Cinematography	Hoyte van Hoytema	Won	
Austin Film Critics Association Awards	January 10, 2024	Best Film Editing	Jennifer Lame	Won	
Austin Film Critics Association Awards	January 10, 2024	Best Original Score	Ludwig Göransson	Won	
Bodil Awards	March 16, 2024	Best English Language Film	Oppenheimer	Nominated	
Boston Society of Film Critics Awards	December 10, 2023	Best Director	Christopher Nolan	Runner-up (Note: Tied with Todd Haynes for May December)	
Boston Society of Film Critics Awards	December 10, 2023	Best Actor	Cillian Murphy	Runner-up (Note: Tied with Kōji Yakusho for Perfect Days)	
Boston Society of Film Critics Awards	December 10, 2023	Best Supporting Actor	Robert Downey Jr.	Runner-up (Note: Tied with Charles Melton for May December and Mark Ruffalo for Poor Things)	
Boston Society of Film Critics Awards	December 10, 2023	Best Ensemble	Oppenheimer	Won	
British Academy Film Awards	February 18, 2024	Best Film	Christopher Nolan, Charles Roven, and Emma Thomas	Won	
British Academy Film Awards	February 18, 2024	Best Direction	Christopher Nolan	Won	
British Academy Film Awards	February 18, 2024	Best Actor in a Leading Role	Cillian Murphy	Won	
British Academy Film Awards	February 18, 2024	Best Actor in a Supporting Role	Robert Downey Jr.	Won	
British Academy Film Awards	February 18, 2024	Best Actress in a Supporting Role	Emily Blunt	Nominated	
British Academy Film Awards	February 18, 2024	Best Adapted Screenplay	Christopher Nolan	Nominated	
British Academy Film Awards	February 18, 2024	Best Cinematography	Hoyte van Hoytema	Won	
British Academy Film Awards	February 18, 2024	Best Editing	Jennifer Lame	Won	
British Academy Film Awards	February 18, 2024	Best Costume Design	Ellen Mirojnick	Nominated	
British Academy Film Awards	February 18, 2024	Best Production Design	Ruth De Jong and Claire Kaufman	Nominated	
British Academy Film Awards	February 18, 2024	Best Make Up & Hair	Luisa Abel, Jaime Leigh McIntosh, Jason Hamer, and Ahou Mofid	Nominated	
British Academy Film Awards	February 18, 2024	Best Original Score	Ludwig Göransson	Won	
British Academy Film Awards	February 18, 2024	Best Sound	Willie D. Burton, Richard King, Kevin O'Connell, and Gary A. Rizzo	Nominated	
British Film Editors Cut Above Awards	February 16, 2024	Best Edited Single Drama	Jennifer Lame	Won	
British Society of Cinematographers Awards	February 3, 2024	Best Cinematography in a Theatrical Feature Film	Hoyte van Hoytema	Nominated	
Capri Hollywood International Film Festival Awards	January 2, 2024	Best Picture	Oppenheimer	Won	
Capri Hollywood International Film Festival Awards	January 2, 2024	Best Director	Christopher Nolan	Won	
Capri Hollywood International Film Festival Awards	January 2, 2024	Best Ensemble Cast	Cillian Murphy, Emily Blunt, Matt Damon, Robert Downey Jr., Florence Pugh, Josh Hartnett, Casey Affleck, Rami Malek, and Kenneth Branagh	Won	
Capri Hollywood International Film Festival Awards	January 2, 2024	Best Cinematography	Hoyte van Hoytema	Won	
Capri Hollywood International Film Festival Awards	January 2, 2024	Best Film Editing	Jennifer Lame	Won	
Capri Hollywood International Film Festival Awards	January 2, 2024	Best Sound Editing	Oppenheimer	Won	
Capri Hollywood International Film Festival Awards	January 2, 2024	Best Original Score	Ludwig Göransson	Won	
César Awards	February 23, 2024	Best Foreign Film	Oppenheimer	Nominated	
Chicago Film Critics Association Awards	December 12, 2023	Best Film	Oppenheimer	Nominated	
Chicago Film Critics Association Awards	December 12, 2023	Best Director	Christopher Nolan	Won	
Chicago Film Critics Association Awards	December 12, 2023	Best Actor	Cillian Murphy	Nominated	
Chicago Film Critics Association Awards	December 12, 2023	Best Supporting Actor	Robert Downey Jr.	Nominated	
Chicago Film Critics Association Awards	December 12, 2023	Best Adapted Screenplay	Christopher Nolan	Nominated	
Chicago Film Critics Association Awards	December 12, 2023	Best Art Direction / Production Design	Oppenheimer	Nominated	
Chicago Film Critics Association Awards	December 12, 2023	Best Cinematography	Hoyte van Hoytema	Won	
Chicago Film Critics Association Awards	December 12, 2023	Best Editing	Jennifer Lame	Won	
Chicago Film Critics Association Awards	December 12, 2023	Best Original Score	Ludwig Göransson	Nominated	
Chicago Film Critics Association Awards	December 12, 2023	Best Use of Visual Effects	Oppenheimer	Nominated	
Cinema Audio Society Awards	March 2, 2024	Outstanding Achievement in Sound Mixing for a Motion Picture – Live Action	Willie D. Burton, Gary A. Rizzo, Kevin O'Connell, Chris Fogel, Tavish Grade, Jack Cucci, and Mikel Parraga-Wills	Won	
Cinema for Peace Awards	February 18–19, 2024	Cinema for Peace Dove for The Most Valuable Film of the Year 2024	Oppenheimer	Nominated	
Costume Designers Guild Awards	February 21, 2024	Excellence in Period Film	Ellen Mirojnick	Nominated	
Critics' Choice Movie Awards	January 14, 2024	Best Picture	Oppenheimer	Won	
Critics' Choice Movie Awards	January 14, 2024	Best Director	Christopher Nolan	Won	
Critics' Choice Movie Awards	January 14, 2024	Best Actor	Cillian Murphy	Nominated	
Critics' Choice Movie Awards	January 14, 2024	Best Supporting Actor	Robert Downey Jr.	Won	
Critics' Choice Movie Awards	January 14, 2024	Best Supporting Actress	Emily Blunt	Nominated	
Critics' Choice Movie Awards	January 14, 2024	Best Acting Ensemble	Oppenheimer	Won	
Critics' Choice Movie Awards	January 14, 2024	Best Adapted Screenplay	Christopher Nolan	Nominated	
Critics' Choice Movie Awards	January 14, 2024	Best Cinematography	Hoyte van Hoytema	Won	
Critics' Choice Movie Awards	January 14, 2024	Best Production Design	Ruth De Jong and Claire Kaufman	Nominated	
Critics' Choice Movie Awards	January 14, 2024	Best Editing	Jennifer Lame	Won	
Critics' Choice Movie Awards	January 14, 2024	Best Hair and Makeup	Oppenheimer	Nominated	
Critics' Choice Movie Awards	January 14, 2024	Best Visual Effects	Oppenheimer	Won	
Critics' Choice Movie Awards	January 14, 2024	Best Score	Ludwig Göransson	Won	
Dallas–Fort Worth Film Critics Association Awards	December 18, 2023	Top 10 Films of the Year	Oppenheimer	Runner-up	
Dallas–Fort Worth Film Critics Association Awards	December 18, 2023	Best Director	Christopher Nolan	Won	
Dallas–Fort Worth Film Critics Association Awards	December 18, 2023	Best Actor	Cillian Murphy	Won	
Dallas–Fort Worth Film Critics Association Awards	December 18, 2023	Best Supporting Actor	Robert Downey Jr.	Won	
Dallas–Fort Worth Film Critics Association Awards	December 18, 2023	Best Supporting Actress	Emily Blunt	3rd Place	
Dallas–Fort Worth Film Critics Association Awards	December 18, 2023	Best Cinematography	Hoyte van Hoytema	Won	
Dallas–Fort Worth Film Critics Association Awards	December 18, 2023	Best Musical Score	Ludwig Göransson	Runner-up	
David di Donatello Awards	May 3, 2024	Best Foreign Film	Oppenheimer	Nominated	
Directors Guild of America Awards	February 10, 2024	Outstanding Directing – Feature Film	Christopher Nolan	Won	
Dorian Awards	February 26, 2024	Director of the Year	Christopher Nolan	Nominated	
Dorian Awards	February 26, 2024	Film Performance of the Year	Cillian Murphy	Nominated	
Dorian Awards	February 26, 2024	Supporting Film Performance of the Year	Robert Downey Jr.	Nominated	
Dorian Awards	February 26, 2024	Film Music of the Year	Ludwig Göransson	Nominated	
Dorian Awards	February 26, 2024	Visually Striking Film of the Year	Oppenheimer	Nominated	
Dublin Film Critics' Circle Awards	December 19, 2023	Best Film	Oppenheimer	3rd Place	
Dublin Film Critics' Circle Awards	December 19, 2023	Best Director	Christopher Nolan	3rd Place	
Dublin Film Critics' Circle Awards	December 19, 2023	Best Actor	Cillian Murphy	Won	
Dublin Film Critics' Circle Awards	December 19, 2023	Best Cinematography	Hoyte van Hoytema	Runner-up	
Edda Awards	April 13, 2024	Foreign Film of the Year	Oppenheimer	Nominated	
Federation of American Scientists	November 15, 2023	Public Service Award – Contributions to Culture	Christopher Nolan	Won	
Florida Film Critics Circle Awards	December 21, 2023	Best Film	Oppenheimer	Nominated	
Florida Film Critics Circle Awards	December 21, 2023	Best Director	Christopher Nolan	Runner-up	
Florida Film Critics Circle Awards	December 21, 2023	Best Actor	Cillian Murphy	Nominated	
Florida Film Critics Circle Awards	December 21, 2023	Best Supporting Actor	Robert Downey Jr.	Runner-up	
Florida Film Critics Circle Awards	December 21, 2023	Best Supporting Actress	Emily Blunt	Nominated	
Florida Film Critics Circle Awards	December 21, 2023	Best Ensemble	Oppenheimer	Nominated	
Florida Film Critics Circle Awards	December 21, 2023	Best Adapted Screenplay	Christopher Nolan	Nominated	
Florida Film Critics Circle Awards	December 21, 2023	Best Cinematography	Hoyte van Hoytema	Runner-up	
Florida Film Critics Circle Awards	December 21, 2023	Best Score	Ludwig Göransson	Runner-up	
Florida Film Critics Circle Awards	December 21, 2023	Best Visual Effects	Oppenheimer	Runner-up (Note: Tied with The Creator)	
Georgia Film Critics Association Awards	January 5, 2024	Best Picture	Oppenheimer	Won	
Georgia Film Critics Association Awards	January 5, 2024	Best Director	Christopher Nolan	Won	
Georgia Film Critics Association Awards	January 5, 2024	Best Actor	Cillian Murphy	Won	
Georgia Film Critics Association Awards	January 5, 2024	Best Supporting Actor	Robert Downey Jr.	Won	
Georgia Film Critics Association Awards	January 5, 2024	Best Supporting Actress	Emily Blunt	Runner-up	
Georgia Film Critics Association Awards	January 5, 2024	Best Ensemble	Oppenheimer	Won	
Georgia Film Critics Association Awards	January 5, 2024	Best Adapted Screenplay	Christopher Nolan	Won	
Georgia Film Critics Association Awards	January 5, 2024	Best Cinematography	Hoyte van Hoytema	Won	
Georgia Film Critics Association Awards	January 5, 2024	Best Production Design	Ruth De Jong and Claire Kaufman	Nominated	
Georgia Film Critics Association Awards	January 5, 2024	Best Original Score	Ludwig Göransson	Won	
Golden Globe Awards	January 7, 2024	Best Motion Picture – Drama	Oppenheimer	Won	
Golden Globe Awards	January 7, 2024	Cinematic and Box Office Achievement	Oppenheimer	Nominated	
Golden Globe Awards	January 7, 2024	Best Director	Christopher Nolan	Won	
Golden Globe Awards	January 7, 2024	Best Actor – Motion Picture Drama	Cillian Murphy	Won	
Golden Globe Awards	January 7, 2024	Best Supporting Actor – Motion Picture	Robert Downey Jr.	Won	
Golden Globe Awards	January 7, 2024	Best Supporting Actress – Motion Picture	Emily Blunt	Nominated	
Golden Globe Awards	January 7, 2024	Best Screenplay	Christopher Nolan	Nominated	
Golden Globe Awards	January 7, 2024	Best Original Score	Ludwig Göransson	Won	
Golden Reel Awards	March 3, 2024	Outstanding Achievement in Sound Editing – Feature Dialogue / ADR	Richard King, David Bach, Russell Farmarco, and Albert Gasser	Won	
Golden Reel Awards	March 3, 2024	Outstanding Achievement in Sound Editing – Feature Effects / Foley	Richard King, Michael Mitchell, Randy Torres, Christopher Flick, Dan O'Connell, and John Cucci	Won	
Golden Reel Awards	March 3, 2024	Outstanding Achievement in Music Editing – Feature Motion Picture	Amanda Goodpaster, Felipe Pacheco, and Alex Gibson	Nominated	
Golden Rooster Awards	November 16, 2024	Best Foreign Language Film	Oppenheimer	Won	
Golden Trailer Awards	June 29, 2023	Best Drama	Universal Pictures and Trailer Park, Inc. (for "Secrets")	Won	
Golden Trailer Awards	June 29, 2023	Best Summer 2023 Blockbuster Trailer	Universal Pictures and Trailer Park, Inc. (for "Secrets")	Won	
Golden Trailer Awards	June 29, 2023	Best Sound Editing	Universal Pictures and Trailer Park, Inc. (for "Secrets")	Won	
Golden Trailer Awards	June 29, 2023	Best Thriller	Universal Pictures and Inside Job (for "Lightmaker")	Nominated	
Golden Trailer Awards	June 29, 2023	Best Drama TV Spot (for a Feature FIlm)	Universal Pictures and Inside Job (for "Charge")	Nominated	
Golden Trailer Awards	June 29, 2023	Best Thriller TV Spot (for a Feature Film)	Universal Pictures and Inside Job (for "Charge")	Nominated	
Golden Trailer Awards	June 29, 2023	Best Sound Editing in a TV Spot (for a Feature Film)	Universal Pictures and Inside Job (for "Charge")	Nominated	
Grammy Awards	February 4, 2024	Best Score Soundtrack for Visual Media	Ludwig Göransson	Won	
Grammy Awards	February 4, 2024	Best Arrangement, Instrumental or A Cappella	Ludwig Göransson for "Can You Hear the Music"	Nominated	
Grammy Awards	February 4, 2024	Best Instrumental Composition	Ludwig Göransson for "Can You Hear the Music"	Nominated	
Heartland International Film Festival Awards	July 21, 2023	Truly Moving Picture Award	Oppenheimer	Won	
Hollywood Music in Media Awards	November 15, 2023	Best Original Score – Feature Film	Ludwig Göransson	Nominated	
Hollywood Professional Association Awards	November 9, 2023	Outstanding Color Grading – Live-Action Theatrical Feature	Kostas Theodosiou and Kristen Zimmerman (FotoKem)	Won	
Hollywood Professional Association Awards	November 9, 2023	Outstanding Editing – Theatrical Feature	Jennifer Lame	Won	
Houston Film Critics Society Awards	January 22, 2024	Best Picture	Oppenheimer	Nominated	
Houston Film Critics Society Awards	January 22, 2024	Best Director	Christopher Nolan	Won	
Houston Film Critics Society Awards	January 22, 2024	Best Actor	Cillian Murphy	Nominated	
Houston Film Critics Society Awards	January 22, 2024	Best Supporting Actor	Robert Downey Jr.	Nominated	
Houston Film Critics Society Awards	January 22, 2024	Best Supporting Actress	Emily Blunt	Nominated	
Houston Film Critics Society Awards	January 22, 2024	Best Ensemble Cast	Oppenheimer	Nominated	
Houston Film Critics Society Awards	January 22, 2024	Best Screenplay	Christopher Nolan, Kai Bird, and Martin J. Sherwin	Nominated	
Houston Film Critics Society Awards	January 22, 2024	Best Cinematography	Hoyte van Hoytema	Won	
Houston Film Critics Society Awards	January 22, 2024	Best Original Score	Ludwig Göransson	Nominated	
ICG Publicists Awards	March 8, 2024	Maxwell Weinberg Award for Motion Picture Publicity Campaign	Oppenheimer	Nominated	
IndieWire Critics Poll	December 11, 2023	Best Film	Oppenheimer	Runner-up	
IndieWire Critics Poll	December 11, 2023	Best Director	Christopher Nolan	Runner-up	
IndieWire Critics Poll	December 11, 2023	Best Performance	Cillian Murphy	4th Place	
IndieWire Critics Poll	December 11, 2023	Best Screenplay	Christopher Nolan	8th Place	
IndieWire Critics Poll	December 11, 2023	Best Cinematography	Hoyte van Hoytema	Won	
International Cinephile Society Awards	February 11, 2024	Best Editing	Jennifer Lame	Nominated	
International Cinephile Society Awards	February 11, 2024	Best Sound Design	Richard King, Kevin O'Connell, Gary A. Rizzo, and Willie D. Burton	Nominated	
International Film Music Critics Association Awards	February 22, 2024	Film Score of the Year	Ludwig Göransson	Nominated	
International Film Music Critics Association Awards	February 22, 2024	Best Original Score for a Drama Film	Ludwig Göransson	Won	
International Film Music Critics Association Awards	February 22, 2024	Film Music Composition of the Year	Ludwig Göransson (for "Can You Hear the Music")	Nominated	
Irish Film & Television Awards	April 20, 2024	Best International Film	Oppenheimer	Won	
Irish Film & Television Awards	April 20, 2024	Best Lead Actor	Cillian Murphy	Won	
Irish Film & Television Awards	April 20, 2024	Best Supporting Actor	Kenneth Branagh	Nominated	
Kansas City Film Critics Circle Awards	January 27, 2024	Best Film	Oppenheimer	Won	
Kansas City Film Critics Circle Awards	January 27, 2024	Robert Altman Award for Best Director	Christopher Nolan	Won	
Kansas City Film Critics Circle Awards	January 27, 2024	Best Actor	Cillian Murphy	Won (Note: Shared with Paul Giamatti for The Holdovers)	
Kansas City Film Critics Circle Awards	January 27, 2024	Best Supporting Actor	Robert Downey Jr.	Won	
Kansas City Film Critics Circle Awards	January 27, 2024	Best Cinematography	Hoyte van Hoytema	Won	
Kansas City Film Critics Circle Awards	January 27, 2024	Best Original Score	Ludwig Göransson	Won	
Location Managers Guild International Awards	August 24, 2024	Outstanding Film Commission	New Mexico Film Office	Nominated	
Location Managers Guild International Awards	August 24, 2024	Outstanding Locations in a Period Feature Film	Justin Duncan, Dennis Muscari, Patty Carey-Perazzo, and T.C. Townsen	Won	
London Film Critics' Circle Awards	February 4, 2024	Film of the Year	Oppenheimer	Nominated	
London Film Critics' Circle Awards	February 4, 2024	Director of the Year	Christopher Nolan	Nominated	
London Film Critics' Circle Awards	February 4, 2024	Screenwriter of the Year	Christopher Nolan	Nominated	
London Film Critics' Circle Awards	February 4, 2024	Actor of the Year	Cillian Murphy	Nominated	
London Film Critics' Circle Awards	February 4, 2024	British/Irish Performer of the Year	Cillian Murphy	Nominated	
London Film Critics' Circle Awards	February 4, 2024	Supporting Actor of the Year	Robert Downey Jr.	Nominated	
London Film Critics' Circle Awards	February 4, 2024	Technical Achievement Award	Andrew Jackson	Nominated	
Los Angeles Film Critics Association Awards	December 10, 2023	Best Film	Oppenheimer	Runner-up	
Make-Up Artists and Hair Stylists Guild Awards	February 18, 2024	Best Period and/or Character Make-Up	Luisa Abel, Jason Hamer, Kerrin Jackson, and Jamie Loree Hess	Nominated	
National Board of Review Awards	December 6, 2023	Top 10 Films	Oppenheimer	Won	
National Society of Film Critics Awards	January 6, 2024	Best Film	Oppenheimer	3rd Place	
National Society of Film Critics Awards	January 6, 2024	Best Director	Christopher Nolan	3rd Place	
National Society of Film Critics Awards	January 6, 2024	Best Actor	Cillian Murphy	3rd Place	
National Society of Film Critics Awards	January 6, 2024	Best Supporting Actor	Robert Downey Jr.	Runner-up (Note: Tied with Ryan Gosling for Barbie)	
National Society of Film Critics Awards	January 6, 2024	Best Cinematography	Hoyte van Hoytema	3rd Place	
New York Film Critics Circle Awards	November 30, 2023	Best Director	Christopher Nolan	Won	
New York Film Critics Circle Awards	November 30, 2023	Best Cinematography	Hoyte van Hoytema	Won	
New York Film Critics Online Awards	December 15, 2023	Top 10 Films	Oppenheimer	Won	
New York Film Critics Online Awards	December 15, 2023	Best Director	Christopher Nolan	Won	
New York Film Critics Online Awards	December 15, 2023	Best Actor	Cillian Murphy	Won	
New York Film Critics Online Awards	December 15, 2023	Best Ensemble	Oppenheimer	Won	
New York Film Critics Online Awards	December 15, 2023	Best Cinematography	Hoyte van Hoytema	Won	
Online Film Critics Society Awards	January 22, 2024	Best Picture	Oppenheimer	Won	
Online Film Critics Society Awards	January 22, 2024	Best Director	Christopher Nolan	Won	
Online Film Critics Society Awards	January 22, 2024	Best Actor	Cillian Murphy	Nominated	
Online Film Critics Society Awards	January 22, 2024	Best Supporting Actor	Robert Downey Jr.	Won	
Online Film Critics Society Awards	January 22, 2024	Best Supporting Actress	Emily Blunt	Nominated	
Online Film Critics Society Awards	January 22, 2024	Best Adapted Screenplay	Christopher Nolan	Won	
Online Film Critics Society Awards	January 22, 2024	Best Cinematography	Hoyte van Hoytema	Won	
Online Film Critics Society Awards	January 22, 2024	Best Editing	Jennifer Lame	Won	
Online Film Critics Society Awards	January 22, 2024	Best Costume Design	Ellen Mirojnick	Nominated	
Online Film Critics Society Awards	January 22, 2024	Best Production Design	Ruth De Jong	Nominated	
Online Film Critics Society Awards	January 22, 2024	Best Original Score	Ludwig Göransson	Won	
Online Film Critics Society Awards	January 22, 2024	Best Visual Effects	Oppenheimer	Won	
Palm Springs International Film Festival Awards	January 4, 2024	Desert Palm Achievement Award – Actor	Cillian Murphy	Won	
People's Choice Awards	February 18, 2024	The Movie of the Year	Oppenheimer	Nominated	
People's Choice Awards	February 18, 2024	The Drama Movie of the Year	Oppenheimer	Won	
People's Choice Awards	February 18, 2024	The Male Movie Star of the Year	Cillian Murphy	Nominated	
People's Choice Awards	February 18, 2024	The Female Movie Star of the Year	Florence Pugh	Nominated	
People's Choice Awards	February 18, 2024	The Drama Movie Star of the Year	Cillian Murphy	Nominated	
People's Choice Awards	February 18, 2024	The Drama Movie Star of the Year	Florence Pugh	Nominated	
Producers Guild of America Awards	February 25, 2024	Outstanding Producer of Theatrical Motion Pictures	Emma Thomas, Charles Roven, and Christopher Nolan	Won	
Robert Awards	February 3, 2024	Best English Language Film	Christopher Nolan	Won	
Santa Barbara International Film Festival Awards	February 11, 2024	Variety Artisans Award	Ludwig Göransson	Won	
Santa Barbara International Film Festival Awards	February 11, 2024	Variety Artisans Award	Jennifer Lame	Won	
San Diego Film Critics Society Awards	December 19, 2023	Best Picture	Oppenheimer	Runner-up	
San Diego Film Critics Society Awards	December 19, 2023	Best Director	Christopher Nolan	Nominated	
San Diego Film Critics Society Awards	December 19, 2023	Best Actor	Cillian Murphy	Nominated	
San Diego Film Critics Society Awards	December 19, 2023	Best Supporting Actor	Robert Downey Jr.	Won	
San Diego Film Critics Society Awards	December 19, 2023	Best Ensemble	Oppenheimer	Nominated	
San Diego Film Critics Society Awards	December 19, 2023	Best Adapted Screenplay	Christopher Nolan	Nominated	
San Diego Film Critics Society Awards	December 19, 2023	Best Cinematography	Hoyte van Hoytema	Runner-up	
San Diego Film Critics Society Awards	December 19, 2023	Best Editing	Jennifer Lame	Runner-up	
San Diego Film Critics Society Awards	December 19, 2023	Best Production Design	Ruth De Jong	Runner-up	
San Diego Film Critics Society Awards	December 19, 2023	Best Costume Design	Ellen Mirojnick	Nominated	
San Diego Film Critics Society Awards	December 19, 2023	Best Sound Design	Oppenheimer	Runner-up	
San Diego Film Critics Society Awards	December 19, 2023	Best Visual Effects	Oppenheimer	Nominated	
San Francisco Bay Area Film Critics Circle Awards	January 9, 2024	Best Picture	Oppenheimer	Won	
San Francisco Bay Area Film Critics Circle Awards	January 9, 2024	Best Director	Christopher Nolan	Nominated	
San Francisco Bay Area Film Critics Circle Awards	January 9, 2024	Best Actor	Cillian Murphy	Nominated	
San Francisco Bay Area Film Critics Circle Awards	January 9, 2024	Best Supporting Actor	Robert Downey Jr.	Won	
San Francisco Bay Area Film Critics Circle Awards	January 9, 2024	Best Supporting Actress	Emily Blunt	Nominated	
San Francisco Bay Area Film Critics Circle Awards	January 9, 2024	Best Adapted Screenplay	Christopher Nolan	Nominated	
San Francisco Bay Area Film Critics Circle Awards	January 9, 2024	Best Cinematography	Hoyte van Hoytema	Won	
San Francisco Bay Area Film Critics Circle Awards	January 9, 2024	Best Film Editing	Jennifer Lame	Nominated	
San Francisco Bay Area Film Critics Circle Awards	January 9, 2024	Best Production Design	Ruth De Jong	Nominated	
San Francisco Bay Area Film Critics Circle Awards	January 9, 2024	Best Original Score	Ludwig Göransson	Nominated	
Sant Jordi Awards	April 24, 2024	Best Actor in a Foreign Film	Cillian Murphy	Won	
Satellite Awards	March 3, 2024	Best Motion Picture – Drama	Oppenheimer	Won	
Satellite Awards	March 3, 2024	Best Director	Christopher Nolan	Won	
Satellite Awards	March 3, 2024	Best Actor in a Motion Picture – Drama	Cillian Murphy	Won	
Satellite Awards	March 3, 2024	Best Actor in a Supporting Role	Robert Downey Jr.	Nominated	
Satellite Awards	March 3, 2024	Best Actress in a Supporting Role	Emily Blunt	Nominated	
Satellite Awards	March 3, 2024	Best Ensemble – Motion Picture	Oppenheimer	Won	
Satellite Awards	March 3, 2024	Best Adapted Screenplay	Christopher Nolan	Nominated	
Satellite Awards	March 3, 2024	Best Cinematography	Hoyte van Hoytema	Nominated	
Satellite Awards	March 3, 2024	Best Film Editing	Jennifer Lame	Nominated	
Satellite Awards	March 3, 2024	Best Production Design	Ruth De Jong and Claire Kaufman	Nominated	
Satellite Awards	March 3, 2024	Best Costume Design	Ellen Mirojnick	Nominated	
Satellite Awards	March 3, 2024	Best Original Score	Ludwig Göransson	Nominated	
Satellite Awards	March 3, 2024	Best Sound (Editing and Mixing)	Willie D. Burton, Richard King, Kevin O'Connell, and Gary A. Rizzo	Nominated	
Satellite Awards	March 3, 2024	Best Visual Effects	Dave Drzewiecki, Scott R. Fisher, Andrew Jackson, and Giacomo Mineo	Nominated	
Saturn Awards	February 4, 2024	Best Thriller Film	Oppenheimer	Won	
Saturn Awards	February 4, 2024	Best Film Direction	Christopher Nolan	Nominated	
Saturn Awards	February 4, 2024	Best Actor in a Film	Cillian Murphy	Nominated	
Saturn Awards	February 4, 2024	Best Supporting Actor in a Film	Robert Downey Jr.	Nominated	
Saturn Awards	February 4, 2024	Best Supporting Actress in a Film	Emily Blunt	Won	
Saturn Awards	February 4, 2024	Best Film Writing	Christopher Nolan	Nominated	
Saturn Awards	February 4, 2024	Best Film Make-Up	Luisa Abel and Jason Hamer	Nominated	
Saturn Awards	February 4, 2024	Best Film Editing	Jennifer Lame	Won	
Saturn Awards	February 4, 2024	Best Film Production Design	Ruth De Jong	Nominated	
Saturn Awards	February 4, 2024	Best Film Costume	Ellen Mirojnick	Nominated	
Saturn Awards	February 4, 2024	Best Film Visual / Special Effects	Andrew Jackson, Giacomo Mineo, Scott R. Fisher, and Dave Drzewiecki	Nominated	
Saturn Awards	February 4, 2024	Visionary Award	Christopher Nolan	Won	
SCAD Savannah Film Festival	October 22, 2023	Variety's Creative Impact in Cinematography Award	Hoyte van Hoytema	Won	
Screen Actors Guild Awards	February 24, 2024	Outstanding Performance by a Cast in a Motion Picture	Casey Affleck, Emily Blunt, Kenneth Branagh, Matt Damon, Robert Downey Jr., Josh Hartnett, Rami Malek, Cillian Murphy, and Florence Pugh	Won	
Screen Actors Guild Awards	February 24, 2024	Outstanding Performance by a Male Actor in a Leading Role	Cillian Murphy	Won	
Screen Actors Guild Awards	February 24, 2024	Outstanding Performance by a Male Actor in a Supporting Role	Robert Downey Jr.	Won	
Screen Actors Guild Awards	February 24, 2024	Outstanding Performance by a Female Actor in a Supporting Role	Emily Blunt	Nominated	
Seattle Film Critics Society Awards	January 8, 2024	Best Picture of the Year	Oppenheimer	Nominated	
Seattle Film Critics Society Awards	January 8, 2024	Best Director	Christopher Nolan	Nominated	
Seattle Film Critics Society Awards	January 8, 2024	Best Actor in a Leading Role	Cillian Murphy	Nominated	
Seattle Film Critics Society Awards	January 8, 2024	Best Ensemble Cast	John Papsidera	Nominated	
Seattle Film Critics Society Awards	January 8, 2024	Best Cinematography	Hoyte van Hoytema	Nominated	
Seattle Film Critics Society Awards	January 8, 2024	Best Editing	Jennifer Lame	Won	
Seattle Film Critics Society Awards	January 8, 2024	Best Original Score	Ludwig Göransson	Won	
Seattle Film Critics Society Awards	January 8, 2024	Best Production Design	Ruth De Jong and Claire Kaufman	Nominated	
Seattle Film Critics Society Awards	January 8, 2024	Best Visual Effects	Andrew Jackson, Giacomo Mineo, Scott R. Fisher, and Dave Drzewiecki	Nominated	
Set Decorators Society of America Awards	February 13, 2024	Best Achievement in Décor/Design of a Period Feature Film	Claire Kaufman and Ruth De Jong	Nominated	
Society of Composers & Lyricists Awards	February 13, 2024	Outstanding Original Score for a Studio Film	Ludwig Göransson	Won	
St. Louis Film Critics Association Awards	December 17, 2023	Best Film	Oppenheimer	Won	
St. Louis Film Critics Association Awards	December 17, 2023	Best Director	Christopher Nolan	Won	
St. Louis Film Critics Association Awards	December 17, 2023	Best Actor	Cillian Murphy	Won	
St. Louis Film Critics Association Awards	December 17, 2023	Best Supporting Actor	Robert Downey Jr.	Runner-up (Note: Tied with Charles Melton for May December)	
St. Louis Film Critics Association Awards	December 17, 2023	Best Supporting Actress	Emily Blunt	Nominated	
St. Louis Film Critics Association Awards	December 17, 2023	Best Ensemble	Oppenheimer	Runner-up (Note: Tied with the cast of Barbie)	
St. Louis Film Critics Association Awards	December 17, 2023	Best Adapted Screenplay	Christopher Nolan	Won	
St. Louis Film Critics Association Awards	December 17, 2023	Best Cinematography	Hoyte van Hoytema	Won	
St. Louis Film Critics Association Awards	December 17, 2023	Best Editing	Jennifer Lame	Won	
St. Louis Film Critics Association Awards	December 17, 2023	Best Production Design	Ruth De Jong	Nominated	
St. Louis Film Critics Association Awards	December 17, 2023	Best Costume Design	Ellen Mirojnick	Nominated	
St. Louis Film Critics Association Awards	December 17, 2023	Best Music Score	Ludwig Göransson	Won	
St. Louis Film Critics Association Awards	December 17, 2023	Best Visual Effects	Oppenheimer	Runner-up	
St. Louis Film Critics Association Awards	December 17, 2023	Best Scene	Oppenheimer (for "Trinity test")	Nominated	
Toronto Film Critics Association Awards	December 17, 2023	Outstanding Supporting Performance	Robert Downey Jr.	Runner-up (Note: Tied with Robert De Niro for Killers of the Flower Moon, Glenn Howerton for BlackBerry, and Charles Melton for May December)	
Turkish Film Critics Association Awards	January 25, 2024	Best Foreign Film	Oppenheimer	10th Place	
USC Scripter Awards	March 2, 2024	Best Film Adaptation	Christopher Nolan (adapted from American Prometheus by Kai Bird and Martin J. Sherwin)	Nominated	
Vancouver Film Critics Circle Awards	February 12, 2024	Best Film	Oppenheimer	Nominated	
Vancouver Film Critics Circle Awards	February 12, 2024	Best Director	Christopher Nolan	Won	
Vancouver Film Critics Circle Awards	February 12, 2024	Best Male Actor	Cillian Murphy	Nominated	
Vancouver Film Critics Circle Awards	February 12, 2024	Best Supporting Male Actor	Robert Downey Jr.	Won	
Vancouver Film Critics Circle Awards	February 12, 2024	Best Supporting Female Actor	Emily Blunt	Nominated	
Vancouver Film Critics Circle Awards	February 12, 2024	Best Screenplay	Christopher Nolan	Nominated	
Visual Effects Society Awards	February 21, 2024	Outstanding Visual Effects in a Photoreal Feature	Andrew Jackson, Mike Chambers, Giacomo Mineo, Dave Drzewiecki, and Scott R. Fisher	Nominated	
Visual Effects Society Awards	February 21, 2024	Outstanding Special (Practical) Effects in a Photoreal Project	Scott R. Fisher, James Rollins, and Mario Vanillo	Won	
Washington D.C. Area Film Critics Association Awards	December 10, 2023	Best Feature	Oppenheimer	Nominated	
Washington D.C. Area Film Critics Association Awards	December 10, 2023	Best Director	Christopher Nolan	Won	
Washington D.C. Area Film Critics Association Awards	December 10, 2023	Best Actor	Cillian Murphy	Won	
Washington D.C. Area Film Critics Association Awards	December 10, 2023	Best Supporting Actor	Robert Downey Jr.	Nominated	
Washington D.C. Area Film Critics Association Awards	December 10, 2023	Best Supporting Actress	Emily Blunt	Nominated	
Washington D.C. Area Film Critics Association Awards	December 10, 2023	Best Acting Ensemble	Oppenheimer	Won	
Washington D.C. Area Film Critics Association Awards	December 10, 2023	Best Adapted Screenplay	Christopher Nolan	Nominated	
Washington D.C. Area Film Critics Association Awards	December 10, 2023	Best Production Design	Ruth De Jong and Claire Kaufman	Nominated	
Washington D.C. Area Film Critics Association Awards	December 10, 2023	Best Cinematography	Hoyte van Hoytema	Won	
Washington D.C. Area Film Critics Association Awards	December 10, 2023	Best Editing	Jennifer Lame	Won	
Washington D.C. Area Film Critics Association Awards	December 10, 2023	Best Original Score	Ludwig Göransson	Won	
Women Film Critics Circle Awards	December 18, 2023	Best Actor	Cillian Murphy	Won	
Writers Guild of America Awards	April 14, 2024	Best Adapted Screenplay	Christopher Nolan	Nominated	
