= 18th Hollywood Film Awards =

US film awards ceremony in 2014

- Location: Los Angeles, California
- Founded: 1997
- Festival date: November 14, 2014
- Website: www.hollywoodawards.com

The 18th Hollywood Film Awards were held on November 14, 2014, and aired on CBS. The ceremony took place at the Hollywood Palladium in Los Angeles, California.

== Winners ==
- Hollywood Career Achievement Award: Michael Keaton
- Hollywood Film Award: Gone Girl (accepted by Ben Affleck)
- Hollywood Director Award: Morten Tyldum for The Imitation Game
- Hollywood Actor Award: Benedict Cumberbatch for The Imitation Game
- Hollywood Actress Award: Julianne Moore for Still Alice
- Hollywood Supporting Actor Award: Robert Duvall for The Judge
- Hollywood Supporting Actress Award: Keira Knightley for The Imitation Game
- Hollywood Ensemble Award: Foxcatcher (Steve Carell, Channing Tatum, Mark Ruffalo)
- Hollywood Breakout Performance Actress Award: Shailene Woodley for The Fault in Our Stars
- Hollywood Breakout Performance Actor Award: Eddie Redmayne for The Theory of Everything
- Hollywood Breakthrough Director Award: Jean-Marc Vallée for Wild
- New Hollywood Award: Jack O'Connell
- Hollywood Screenwriter Award: Gillian Flynn for Gone Girl
- Hollywood Song Award: "What Is Love" from Rio 2 (accepted and performed by Janelle Monáe)
- Hollywood Animation Award: How to Train Your Dragon 2
- Hollywood Blockbuster Award: Guardians of the Galaxy
- Hollywood Documentary Award: Mike Myers for Supermensch: The Legend of Shep Gordon
- Hollywood Comedy Film Award: Chris Rock for Top Five
- Hollywood International Award: Jing Tian
- Hollywood Cinematography Award: Emmanuel Lubezki for Birdman
- Hollywood Visual Effects Award: Scott Farrar for Transformers: Age of Extinction
- Hollywood Film Composer Award: Alexandre Desplat for The Imitation Game
- Hollywood Costume Design Award: Milena Canonero for The Grand Budapest Hotel
- Hollywood Editing Award: Jay Cassidy and Dody Dorn for Fury
- Hollywood Production Design Award: Dylan Cole and Gary Freeman for Maleficent
- Hollywood Sound Award: Ren Klyce for Gone Girl
- Hollywood Make-Up and Hairstyling Award: David White (Special Make-Up Effects) and Elizabeth Yianni-Georgiou (Hair Designer and Make-Up Designer) for Guardians of the Galaxy
