= Elizabeth Yianni-Georgiou =

British make-up artist

- Other name: Lizzie Yianni-Georgiou
- Occupation: Make-up artist
- Notable credits: Rocketman; Guardians of the Galaxy; Thor: The Dark World; Made in Dagenham; An Education
- Awards: For Guardians of the Galaxy: Saturn Award for Best Make-up, 41st Saturn Awards, with David White; Best Contemporary Make-Up, Film, 2014 Make-Up Artists & Hair Stylists Guild Awards; Critics' Choice Movie Award for Best Makeup, 20th Critics' Choice Awards, with David White; Hollywood Make-Up and Hairstyling Award, 18th Hollywood Film Awards, with David White; For Rocketman: Hollywood Make-Up and Hair Styling Award, 23rd Hollywood Film Awards, with Tapio Salmi and Barrie Gower
- Website: http://www.lizziegeorgiou.com/

Elizabeth Yianni-Georgiou, also known as Lizzie Yianni-Georgiou, is a British make-up artist.

She was co-nominated for an Academy Award in the category Best Makeup and Hairstyling for the film Guardians of the Galaxy with David White. She also received a co-nomination for the BAFTA Award for Best Makeup and Hair at the 68th British Academy Film Awards. She won the Make-Up Artists & Hair Stylists Guild Award for Best Contemporary Make-Up in a Feature-Length Motion Picture for Guardians of the Galaxy in 2014, and was also nominated for the Make-Up Artists & Hair Stylists Guild Award for Best Contemporary Hair Styling in a Feature-Length Motion Picture. She won a Saturn Award for Best Make-up at the 41st Saturn Awards with David White, with the pair also winning the 20th Critics' Choice Awards for Best Hair and Makeup. They also won the Hollywood Make-Up and Hairstyling Award at the 18th Hollywood Film Awards.

Yianni-Georgiou was also co-nominated for three MUAHS Guild awards for Rocketman, as well as Best Makeup and Hair at the 3rd Hollywood Critics Association Film Awards, the 2019 Apolo Awards, and the 73rd British Academy Film Awards. She won the 23rd Hollywood Film Awards for Make-Up & Hair Styling, along with Tapio Salmi and Barrie Gower.

She was nominated for Best Makeup award at the 40th Saturn Awards for Thor: The Dark World, the 64th British Academy Film Awards for Made in Dagenham, and the 63rd British Academy Film Awards for An Education.

Yianni-Georgiou also headed the hair and makeup department for Apple TV+'s Disclaimer. She speaks Greek and Italian.

== Selected filmography ==
Select notable films Elizabeth Yianni-Georgiou has worked on
Year	Title	Accolades	Recipient	Result	Ref.
2025	The Fantastic Four: First Steps	-	-	-	
2021	Last Night in Soho	-	-	-	
2019	Rocketman	MUAHS Guild's Best Period/Character Make-Up, Film	Elizabeth Yianni-Georgiou; Tapio Salmi; Laura Solari	Nominated	
2019	Rocketman	MUAHS Guild's Best Period/Character Hair Styling, Film	Elizabeth Yianni-Georgiou; Tapio Salmi; Laura Solari	Nominated	
2019	Rocketman	MUAHS Guild's Best Special Make-Up Effects, Film	Elizabeth Yianni-Georgiou; Barrie Gower; Victoria Money	Nominated	
2019	Rocketman	BAFTA Award for Best Makeup and Hair	Elizabeth Yianni-Georgiou; Tapio Salmi; Barrie Gower	Nominated	
2019	Rocketman	Hollywood Film Awards for Best Make-Up and Hair Styling	Elizabeth Yianni-Georgiou; Tapio Salmi; Barrie Gower	Won	
2019	Rocketman	Hollywood Critics Association Film Awards for Best Hair and Makeup	Elizabeth Yianni-Georgiou; Tapio Salmi; Barrie Gower	Nominated	
2019	Rocketman	Apolo Awards for Best Hair and Make-Up	Elizabeth Yianni-Georgiou; Tapio Salmi; Barrie Gower	Nominated	
2017	The Mummy	-	-	-	
2014	Guardians of the Galaxy	Academy Award for Best Makeup and Hairstyling	Elizabeth Yianni-Georgiou; David White	Nominated	
2014	Guardians of the Galaxy	BAFTA Award for Best Makeup and Hair	Elizabeth Yianni-Georgiou; David White	Nominated	
2014	Guardians of the Galaxy	Saturn Award for Best Make-up	Elizabeth Yianni-Georgiou; David White	Won	
2014	Guardians of the Galaxy	Critics' Choice Movie Award for Best Hair and Makeup	Elizabeth Yianni-Georgiou; David White	Won	
2014	Guardians of the Galaxy	Hollywood Film Awards' Make-Up and Hairstyling Award	Elizabeth Yianni-Georgiou; David White	Won	
2014	Guardians of the Galaxy	MUAHS Guild's Best Contemporary Make-Up, Film	Elizabeth Yianni-Georgiou	Won	
2014	Guardians of the Galaxy	MUAHS Guild's Best Contemporary Hair Styling, Film	Elizabeth Yianni-Georgiou	Nominated	
2013	Thor: The Dark World	Saturn Award for Best Make-up	Elizabeth Yianni-Georgiou; Karen Cohen; David White	Nominated	
2012	Dark Shadows	-	-	-	
2011	The Deep Blue Sea	-	-	-	
2010	Made in Dagenham	BAFTA Award for Best Makeup and Hair	Elizabeth Yianni-Georgiou	Nominated	
2009	An Education	BAFTA Award for Best Makeup and Hair	Elizabeth Yianni-Georgiou	Nominated	
2007	Atonement	-	-	-	
1999	Notting Hill	-	-	-	
1999	Sleepy Hollow	-	-	-	
1998	Saving Private Ryan	-	-	-	
1997	The Borrowers	-	-	-	

== Sources ==
- "The 87th Academy Awards (2015) Nominees and Winners". Academy of Motion Picture Arts and Sciences. 2015.
- "Bafta Film Awards 2011: Winners". BBC News. 13 February 2011.
- "Bafta nominations list 2010". The Guardian. 21 January 2010.
- "Busy Lizzie". Warpaint Magazine. 27 July 2014.
- "Film | Make Up & Hair in 2020". British Academy of Film and Television Arts. 2020. Archived from the original on 14 February 2022.
- The Knowledge. Kent: Benn Business Information Services Limited. 1994. p. 370. ISBN 0-86382-237-1. ISSN 0966-3371.
- Beachum, Chris (30 October 2021). "Lizzie Yianni-Georgiou interview: 'Last Night in Soho' makeup and hair". Gold Derby.
- Beerekamp, Hans; Peters, Harry; Tamsma, Gerwin, eds. (1999). Filmjaarboek 1998 [Film Yearbook 1998] (in Dutch). Amsterdam: International Theatre & Film Books. p. 43. ISBN 90-6403-541-5. ISSN 1387-8379.
- Breznican, Anthony (30 July 2024). "Cate Blanchett Faces Public Shaming in Disclaimer, Alfonso Cuarón's Revenge Thriller". Vanity Fair. Archived from the original on 31 July 2024.
- Chan, Stephanie (7 June 2017). "What Are Those Letters on 'The Mummy'? Makeup Artist Talks Transforming Sofia Boutella in the Film". The Hollywood Reporter.
- Cordero, Mandy (24 February 2015). "Nominee Elizabeth Yianni-Georgiou on Hair & Makeup in Sci-Fi Films". WEBN Boston.
- Curtis, Richard (1999). Notting Hill. Photographer: Coote, Clive. London: Hodder & Stoughton. p. 202. ISBN 0-340-73845-6.
- del Toro, Marcos (10 January 2020). "Las mejores películas LGTB+ del 2019 se citan en los V Premios Apolo" [The best LGBT+ films of 2019 are nominated in the 5th Apolo Awards]. Togayther (in Spanish).
- Giardina, Carolyn (8 January 2015). "'Guardians of the Galaxy,' 'Into the Woods' Lead Make-Up Artists and Hair Stylists Guild Nominations". The Hollywood Reporter.
- Hipes, Patrick (3 November 2019). "Hollywood Film Awards 2019: The Complete Winners List". Deadline Hollywood. Archived from the original on 6 April 2023.
- Hipes, Patrick (11 November 2019). "Make-Up Artists And Hair Stylists Guild Awards Nominees Set". Deadline Hollywood.
- Hornby, Nick (October 2009). An Education: The Screenplay. New York: Riverhead Books. p. 31. ISBN 978-1-59448-453-7.
- Johns, Nikara (25 February 2014). "'Gravity,' 'The Hobbit: The Desolation of Smaug' Lead Saturn Awards Noms". Variety.
- Marcadé, Nicolas, ed. (2013). L'Annuel du Cinema 2013: Tous les Filmes 2012 [Cinema Yearbook 2013: All the Films of 2012] (in French). Paris: Éditions les Fiches du Cinéma. p. 208. ISBN 978-2-902-51622-3.
- McGloin, Matt (26 June 2015). "2015 Saturn Awards: Guardians of the Galaxy, Chris Pratt, James Gunn". Cosmic Book News. Archived from the original on 29 May 2022.
- McLachlan, Megan (14 November 2019). "Rocketman's Hair and Makeup Artist Lizzie Yianni-Georgiou Reveals 'Massive Compliment' She Received From Elton John". Awards Daily.
- Moraski, Lauren (14 November 2014). "Hollywood Film Awards 2014 winners". CBS News.
- Neglia, Matt (25 November 2019). "The 2019 Hollywood Critics Association (HCA) Nominations". Next Best Picture.
- Rich, Katey (13 February 2015). "Chris Pratt Dance Parties, and More Highlights From Guardians of the Galaxy's Oscar-Nominated Makeup Artist". Vanity Fair.
- Ritman, Alex; Szalai, Georg (8 February 2015). "BAFTA Awards: Boyhood Wins Best Film, Grand Budapest Hotel Gets Five Honors". The Hollywood Reporter. Archived from the original on 21 April 2022.
- Robb, David (14 February 2015). "'Grand Budapest', 'Guardians', 'AHS: Freak Show' Top Make-Up & Hair Stylists Awards". Deadline Hollywood.
- Seibold, Witney (14 May 2023). "Why Guardians of the Galaxy's Karen Gillan Had a Wig Made of Her Own Hair". /Film. Archived from the original on 19 May 2023.
- Summers, Richard, ed. (2011). The Knowledge (26th ed.). London: Wilmington Business Intelligence. p. 401. ISBN 978-1-85783-165-8. ISSN 0966-3371.
- Tangalin, John Daniel (29 July 2025). "'The Fantastic Four: First Steps' Non-Spoiler Review – Another Success For Science-Fiction Superhero Cinema". The Cinema Spot.
- Tangcay, Jazz (8 January 2020). "Stylists Return to Fundamentals". Variety. p. 60.
- White, James (16 January 2015). "Birdman Is The Big Winner At The Critics' Choice Awards". Empire Online. Archived from the original on 18 January 2015.
- Yianni-Georgiou, Lizzie (12 September 2017). "Q&A: Makeup & Hair Designer Lizzie Yianni-Georgiou on Bringing the Undead to Life for THE MUMMY (2017)". Daily Dead (Interview). Interviewed by Derek Anderson.
- Yianni-Georgiou, Elizabeth (16 June 2020). "'It's our duty to dismantle film's gender pay gap for women of the future'". The Big Issue.
