= Houdini (miniseries) =

2014 television bio-drama miniseries

- Genre: Historical drama
- Based on: Houdini: A Mind in Chains: A Psychoanalytic Portrait by Bernard C. Meyer, M.D.
- Written by: Nicholas Meyer
- Directed by: Uli Edel
- Starring: Adrien Brody; Kristen Connolly
- Theme music composer: John Debney
- Country of origin: United States
- Original language: English
- No. of episodes: 2

Production
- Producers: Gerald W. Abrams; Andras Hamori; Ildiko Kemeny
- Cinematography: Karl Walter Lindenlaub
- Editors: Sabrina Plisco; David Beatty
- Running time: 174 minutes
- Production companies: Lionsgate Television; A&E Studios; Cypress Point Productions

Original release
- Network: History
- Release: September 1 – September 2, 2014

Houdini is a two-part, four-hour History Channel miniseries written by Nicholas Meyer and directed by Uli Edel. It premiered on September 1, 2014. The series stars Adrien Brody as Harry Houdini and features the life of the legendary illusionist and escape artist from poverty to worldwide fame.

== Cast ==
- Adrien Brody as Harry Houdini, world-famous magician
  - Louis Mertens as Erich Weiss, young Harry
- Kristen Connolly as Bess Houdini, Harry's wife
- Evan Jones as Jim Collins, Harry's assistant
- Eszter Ónodi as Cecilia Weiss, Harry's mother
- Tom Benedict Knight as Dash Houdini, Harry's younger brother
  - Connor Kelly as Young Dash Weiss
- Tim Pigott-Smith as William Melville, head of MI5
- Shaun Williamson as Sidney Reilly, MI5 agent and Harry's handler
- David Calder as Sir Arthur Conan Doyle, creator of Sherlock Holmes and believer in spiritualism
- Linda Marlowe as Lady Jean Doyle, Arthur Conan Doyle's clairvoyant wife
- Megan Dodds as Margery Crandon, spiritualist
- Eric Loren as John Wilkie, head of the United States Secret Service
- Gyula Mesterházy as Kaiser Wilhelm II, German emperor
- Iván Kamarás as Grigori Rasputin, Russian mystic
- Simon Nader as Tsar Nicholas Romanov, emperor of Russia
- Bori Karádi as Tsarina Alexandra Feodorovna, empress of Russia
- Alexis Latham as Arthur Ford, psychic

== Production ==
=== Development ===
History first announced the development of a Harry Houdini biopic miniseries with Adrien Brody attached to star on April 10, 2013. The series was officially green-lit on August 19, 2013, with Kristen Connolly announced as Brody's co-star and Uli Edel as director. The screenplay was to be penned by veteran author and filmmaker Nicholas Meyer, based on the 1976 book Houdini: A Mind in Chains: A Psychoanalytic Portrait by his father, Bernard C. Meyer. Patrizia von Brandenstein and Karl Walter Lindenlaub were also announced as production designer and cinematographer, respectively. On September 17, 2013, it was announced that actor Evan Jones had been added to the cast as Houdini's assistant Jim Collins.

=== Filming ===
Filming on the miniseries began on September 30, 2013. It was shot entirely in Budapest, Hungary (coincidentally the real Harry Houdini's birthplace), which executive producer Gerald W. Abrams described as having "more turn-of-the-century architecture—that's the 19th century—than almost any city in Western culture." Brody, who had studied magic as a child, performed many of the show's stunts himself, including the suspended strait jacket escape and the famous Chinese Water Torture Cell.

=== Music ===
The score to Houdini was written by the veteran film composer John Debney. A lifelong fan of Harry Houdini, Debney joined the project at the behest of a producer with whom he had previously collaborated on the A&E miniseries Bonnie & Clyde. Rather than compose a period score for the series, Debney instead elected to write an "electronic/contemporary" score, with "instruments from the period that would give you the flavor of the times and give you the feeling of who this guy was." A two volume soundtrack was released for digital download by Lakeshore Records on August 26, 2014 and later on CD September 23, 2014.

=== Promotion ===
A trailer for Houdini was released online in early August 2014.

== Episodes ==
| No. | Title | Directed by | Written by | Original release date | US viewers (millions) |
|---|---|---|---|---|---|
| 1 | "Part 1" | Uli Edel | Nicholas Meyer | September 1, 2014 | 3.70 |
The humble beginnings of Harry Houdini as a young boy named Erich Weiss, who enlists his brother Dash to help him practice magic after seeing his very first magician in his hometown of Appleton, Wisconsin. He changes his name to Harry Houdini after his favorite magician Jean-Eugène Robert-Houdin and starts out performing card tricks at sideshows in a traveling circus with his wife Bess as a "two-bit" act. His career soon takes off on the American vaudeville circuit as a master illusionist before achieving international fame as an escape artist, performing for the likes of royalty and celebrities. He becomes the world-famous master magician "The Great Houdini". But through his fame, Harry is recruited by MI5 to run espionage missions with William Melville to spy on Kaiser Wilhelm II in Berlin while balancing his death-defying acts in front of massive audiences.
| 2 | "Part 2" | Uli Edel | Nicholas Meyer | September 2, 2014 | 2.66 |
Harry must adapt to the constantly changing modern world as the industrial age comes to an end. As the invention of moving pictures threatens to steal Harry's spotlight in 1914, he has to come up with bigger and better escapes to get his audience back and decides to bring the show to them. When his mother Cecilia dies, Harry is determined to communicate with her through mediums and clairvoyants, however, they prove to be unsuccessful. He then dedicates his life exposing and debunking these fake spiritualists, including Arthur Conan Doyle's wife, Lady Jean Doyle. In the final years of his life, Harry promises Bess no more death-dying feats and goes back to stage magic before succumbing to a succession of fatal blows to the abdomen from a disgruntled fan while backstage in his dressing room after performing his last act in Detroit.

== Reception ==
=== Ratings ===
Part 1 of the series was watched by 3.7 million viewers, averaging 1.2 million among adults 18–49 and 1.5 million in 25–54. Despite debuting much lower than History's previous series' Hatfields & McCoys and Bonnie & Clyde, Houdini was nevertheless cable television's top miniseries debut of 2014 to date.

=== Critical response ===
Houdini received a mixed response, with praise for the direction, sound design and Brody's performance as a "comeback", although the script was criticized. The series currently holds a 44% "Rotten" rating on the review aggregator Rotten Tomatoes, with a consensus "Houdini's cast is talented, but given the decades of fascination surrounding its subject, the show is oddly lacking in intrigue."

Allison Keene of The Hollywood Reporter praised Brody's Houdini as possessing "infectious zest" and commented that "... the miniseries nails the most important thing: spectacle. Edel's refreshingly dynamic direction and Brody’s buoyant performance allow Houdini's tricks to retain their wonder, even for the jaded modern viewer. That's a magical feat indeed." Despite referring to some aspects of the series as "a bit heavy-handed," Mark Perigard of the Boston Herald gave Houdini a positive "B" rating and opined, "You’ll almost believe in magic—the magic of a miniseries to capture the tics and tricks of a complicated, driven man."

Neil Genzlinger of The New York Times called Brody "a treat to watch," but criticized the screenplay and direction. He added, "A better version of this amazing life will surely be made in one genre or another, but this one's at least diverting." Brian Lowry of Variety, however, spoke less favorably of the series, describing Brody's performance as being "ultimately overwhelmed" by Meyer's "misbegotten, heavy-handed, narrated-ad-nauseam script (...) and Uli Edel's equally obtrusive direction." Meyer addressed the voiceovers in a subsequent interview with StarTrek.com, stating "Well, they – you know, sort of re-cut the movie, and tore a lot of it out, and put in a lot of voiceovers and stuff that I just wasn't crazy about. And [it] wasn't our intention. It hadn't been written."

== Awards and nominations ==
| Year | Awards | Category | Recipient | Outcome | Ref. |
|---|---|---|---|---|---|
| 2015 | Primetime Emmy Awards | Outstanding Lead Actor in a Miniseries or a Movie | Adrien Brody | Nominated | |
| 2015 | Primetime Emmy Awards | Outstanding Directing for a Miniseries, Movie or a Dramatic Special | Uli Edel | Nominated | |
| 2015 | Primetime Creative Emmy Awards | Outstanding Cinematography for a Miniseries or Movie | Karl Walter Lindenlaub | Nominated | |
| 2015 | Primetime Creative Emmy Awards | Outstanding Sound Mixing for a Limited Series or Movie | Onnalee Blank, Kenneth R. Burton, Tamás Csaba | Nominated | |
| 2015 | Primetime Creative Emmy Awards | Outstanding Single-Camera Picture Editing for a Limited Series or Movie | David Beatty, Sabrina Plisco | Nominated | |
| 2015 | Primetime Creative Emmy Awards | Outstanding Makeup for a Limited Series or a Movie | Deborah La Mia Denaver, John E. Jackson, Matthew W. Mungle | Nominated | |
| 2015 | Primetime Creative Emmy Awards | Outstanding Sound Editing for a Miniseries, Movie or a Special | Skip Adams, William H. Angarola, Zane D. Bruce; Robert Guastini, Rick Hinson, Anna MacKenzie, Mike Marchain, Cindy Rabideau, Ray Spiess, Jeanette Surga, Joseph T. Sabella | Won | |
| 2015 | Screen Actors Guild Awards | Outstanding Performance by a Male Actor in a Miniseries or Television Movie | Adrien Brody | Nominated | |
| 2015 | Art Directors Guild Awards | Excellence in Production Design for a Television Movie or Limited Series | John Bucklin, Jerry Wanek, Maia Javan | Nominated | |
| 2015 | Cinema Audio Society Awards | Outstanding Achievement in Sound Mixing for Television Movie or Mini-Series | Onnalee Blank, Kenneth R. Burton, Tamás Csaba, Chris Navarro | Nominated | |
| 2015 | Costume Designers Guild Awards | Outstanding Made for Television Movie or Miniseries | Birgit Hutter | Nominated | |
| 2015 | Directors Guild of America Awards | Outstanding Directing – Television Film | Uli Edel | Nominated | |
| 2015 | Motion Picture Sound Editors | Best Sound Editing - Dialogue and ADR in Short Form Television | David Beadle, Michael J. Benavente, Lance Wiseman | Nominated | |
| 2015 | Motion Picture Sound Editors | Best Sound Editing - Sound Effects and Foley in Long Form Television | Michael J. Benavente; Timothy A. Cleveland, Rachel Corrales, Paul J. Diller, Ryan Maguire, Gary Megregian, Joan Rowe, Michael Sana, John Snider, Robert Ulrich | Won | |
| 2015 | Writers Guild of America Awards | Long Form Adapted | Nicholas Meyer | Nominated | |
| 2015 | Hollywood Makeup Artist and Hair Stylist Guild Awards | Best Period and/or Character Makeup - Television Mini-Series or Motion Picture Made for Television | Gregor Eckstein | Nominated | |
| 2015 | Hollywood Makeup Artist and Hair Stylist Guild Awards | Best Special Makeup Effects - Television Mini-Series or Motion Picture Made for Television | Gregor Eckstein | Nominated | |
| 2015 | Hollywood Makeup Artist and Hair Stylist Guild Awards | Best Period and/or Character Hair Styling - Television Mini-Series or Motion Picture Made for Television | Gregor Eckstein | Nominated | |
| 2015 | Online Film & Television Association Awards | Best Cinematography in a Non-Series | Karl Walter Lindenlaub | Nominated | |
| 2015 | Online Film & Television Association Awards | Best Actor in a Motion Picture or Miniseries | Adrien Brody | Nominated | |

== International broadcast ==
Houdini was first shown on Channel 4 in the UK in September 2014 and later released on Netflix UK on 7 March 2015. Houdini premiered on the Seven Network on June 23, 2015. It is available on Shomi in Canada. In Brazil, Houdini aired on January 5, 2016 as a four-part series on Globo channel. It is available on SonyLIV in India.
