= Make-Up Artists & Hair Stylists Guild Award for Best Contemporary Make-Up in a Feature-Length Motion Picture =

Make-Up Artists and Hair Stylists Guild Award for Best Contemporary Make-Up for a Feature Film
- Country: United States
- Presented by: Make-Up Artists and Hair Stylists Guild (MUAHS)
- First award: 1999
- Currently held by: Merc Arceneaux, Caroline Monge, Trent Simmons, Vera Steimberg; Coming 2 America (2021)
- Website: Make-Up Artists & Hair Stylists Guild

The Make-Up Artists and Hair Stylists Guild Award for Best Contemporary Make-Up for a Feature Film is one of the awards given annually to people working in the motion picture industry by the Make-Up Artists and Hair Stylists Guild (MUAHS). It is presented to the makeup artists whose work has been deemed "best" in a given year, within a contemporary-set film. The award was first given in 2000, during the first annual awards, and was given when the awards were brought back in 2014.

== Winners and nominees ==
=== 1990s ===
Year	Film	Nominees
(1999); 1st
(1999); 1st	The General's Daughter	Toni G, Will Huff, Michèle Burke, Michelle Bühler
(1999); 1st	Goodbye Lover	Debbie Zoller, James MacKinnon, Jill Cady
(1999); 1st	The Story of Us	Ronnie Specter
(1999); 1st	Three Kings	Allan A. Apone, Donald Mowat, Ron Snyder, Adam Brandy

=== 2000s ===
Year	Film	Nominees
(2000); 2nd
(2000); 2nd	Cast Away	Daniel C. Striepeke, Deborah La Mia Denaver, Bill Myer
(2000); 2nd	Bedazzled	Cheri Minns, Kate Biscoe, Ben Nye Jr.
(2000); 2nd	Charlies Angels	Cheryl Ann Nick
(2001); 3rd
(2001); 3rd	Mulholland Drive	Julie Pearce, Randy Westgate, Selina Jayne
(2001); 3rd	The Princess Diaries	Hallie D'Amore, Leonard Engelman
(2001); 3rd	Zoolander	Naomi Donne, Michael Laudati, Kate Biscoe
(2002); 4th
(2002); 4th	My Big Fat Greek Wedding	Ann Brodie
(2002); 4th	8 Mile	Donald Mowat, Ronnie Specter, Matiki Anoff
(2002); 4th	Spider-Man	Deborah La Mia Denaver, Bill Myer, Lois Burwell
(2003); 5th
(2003); 5th	Charlie's Angels: Full Throttle	Kim Greene, Erin Ayanian, Robin Fredriksz
(2003); 5th	Daredevil	Deborah La Mia Denaver, John E. Jackson, Cinzia Zanetti
(2003); 5th	The Human Stain	Donald Mowat, Robert McCann, Gillian Chandler

=== 2010s ===
Year	Film	Nominees
(2013); 6th
(2013); 6th	Prisoners	Donald Mowat, Pamela Westmore
(2013); 6th	August: Osage County	Carla White, Bjoern Rehbein
(2013); 6th	One Chance	Christine Blundell, Donald McInnes
(2014); 7th
(2014); 7th	Guardians of the Galaxy	Elizabeth Yianni-Georgiou
(2014); 7th	Captain America: The Winter Soldier	Allan A. Apone, Nicole Sortillon Amos, Lisa Rocco
(2014); 7th	Gone Girl	Kate Biscoe, Gigi Williams
(2014); 7th	Interstellar	Luisa Abel, Jay Wejebe
(2014); 7th	Nightcrawler	Donald Mowat, Malanie J. Romero
(2015); 8th
(2015); 8th	Furious 7	James MacKinnon, Autumn Butler, Roxy D’Alonzo
(2015); 8th	The Big Short	Julie Hewett, Pamela Westmore
(2015); 8th	Pitch Perfect 2	Melanie Hughes-Weaver, Judy Yonemoto
(2015); 8th	Sicario	Donald Mowat
(2015); 8th	Youth	Matteo Silvi, Maurizio Silvi
(2016); 9th
(2016); 9th	Nocturnal Animals	Donald Mowat, Malanie J. Romero, Elaine Offers
(2016); 9th	Captain Fantastic	Karen Mcdonald, Akemi Hart
(2016); 9th	La La Land	Torsten Witte, Angel Radefeld-Wright
(2016); 9th	Manchester by the Sea	Liz Bernstrom, Sherryn Smith
(2016); 9th	Zoolander 2	Maurizio Silvi
(2017); 10th
(2017); 10th	Pitch Perfect 3	Melanie Hughes-Weaver, Judy Yonemoto, Erica Kyker
(2017); 10th	Baby Driver	Fionagh Cush, Phyllis Temple
(2017); 10th	The Big Sick	Leo Won, Kirsten Sylvester
(2017); 10th	Ghost in the Shell	Deborah La Mia Denaver, Jane O’Kane
(2017); 10th	Wonder	Naomi Bakstad, Jean Black, Megan Harkness
(2018); 11th
(2018); 11th	A Star Is Born	Ve Neill, Debbie Zoller, Sarah Tanno
(2018); 11th	Beautiful Boy	Jean Black, Rolf Keppler
(2018); 11th	Boy Erased	Kimberly Jones, Mi Young, Kyra Panchenko
(2018); 11th	Crazy Rich Asians	Heike Merker, Irina Strukova
(2018); 11th	Welcome to Marwen	Ve Neill, Rosalina De Silva
(2018); 11th	Widows	Ma Kalaadevi Ananda, Denise Pugh-Ruiz, Jacqueline Fernandez
(2019); 12th
(2019); 12th	Bombshell	Vivian Baker, Cristina Waltz, Richard Redlefsen
(2019); 12th	Avengers: Endgame	John Blake, Francisco Perez
(2019); 12th	Hustlers	Margot Boccia, Roxanne Rizzo
(2019); 12th	John Wick: Chapter 3 – Parabellum	Stephen M. Kelley, Anna Stachow
(2019); 12th	Us	Scott Wheeler, Tym Shutchai Buacharern, Sabrina Castro

=== 2020s ===
Year	Film	Nominees
(2020); 13th
(2020); 13th	Birds of Prey (and the Fantabulous Emancipation of One Harley Quinn)	Deborah Lamia Denaver, Sabrina Wilson, Miho Suzuki, Cale Thomas
(2020); 13th	Bill & Ted Face the Music	Bill Corso, Dennis Liddiard, Stephen Kelley
(2020); 13th	Borat Subsequent Moviefilm	Katy Fray, Lisa Layman, Thomas Kolarek
(2020); 13th	The Prom	Eryn Krueger Mekash, J. Roy Helland, Kyra Panchenko, Donald McInnes
(2020); 13th	Promising Young Woman	Angela Wells, Brigitte Hennech, Adam Christopher
(2021); 14th
(2021); 14th	Coming 2 America	Merc Arceneaux, Caroline Monge, Trent Simmons, Vera Steimberg
(2021); 14th	Black Widow	Deborah LaMia Denaver, Paul Gooch, Paula Price
(2021); 14th	Don't Look Up	Liz Bernstrom, Joseph Dulude ll, Julie LeShane, Claudia Moriel
(2021); 14th	No Time to Die	Daniel Phillips
(2021); 14th	The Suicide Squad	Jillian Erickson, Greg Funk, Heba Thorisdottir, Sabrina Wilson
(2022); 15th
(2022); 15th	Everything Everywhere All at Once	Michelle Chung, Erin Rosenmann, Dania A. Ridgway
(2022); 15th	The Batman	Naomi Donne, Doone Forsyth, Norma Webb, Jemma Carballo
(2022); 15th	The Menu	Deborah LaMia Denaver, Mazena Puksto, Donna Cicatelli, Deb Rutherford
(2022); 15th	Nope	Shutchai Tym Buacharern, Jennifer Zide-Essex, Eleanor Sabaduquia, Kato De Stefan
(2022); 15th	Spirited	Monica Huppert, Autumn J. Butler, Vivian Baker
(2023); 16th
(2023); 16th	Saltburn	Siân Miller, Laura Miller
(2023); 16th	Candy Cane Lane	Tym Shutchai Buacharern, Michele Lewis, Jennifer Zide-Essex, Yvettra Grantham
(2023); 16th	Guardians of the Galaxy Vol. 3	Jane Galli
(2023); 16th	Haunted Mansion	Kimberly Jones, Dionne Wynn, Bridgit Crider, Carla Vannessa Wallace
(2023); 16th	Nyad	Felicity Bowring, Ann Maree Hurley, Julie Hewett, Mahar Lessner
(2024); 17th
(2024); 17th	The Substance	Stéphanie Guillon
(2024); 17th	The Deliverance	Beverly Jo Pryor, Eric Pagdin, Chloe Sens, Doug Fairall
(2024); 17th	Emilia Pérez	Julia Floch Carbonel, Simon Livet
(2024); 17th	It Ends with Us	Sarah Graalman, Vivian Baker, Melanie Licata
(2024); 17th	Smile 2	Sasha Grossman, Valerie Carney
