= Ronnie Specter =

American make-up artist

- Other name: Rhonda Specter
- Occupation: Makeup artist
- Years active: 1984-present

Ronnie Specter is an American make-up artist. She was nominated at the 65th Academy Awards in the category of Best Makeup for her work on the film Batman Returns. She shared her nomination with Ve Neill and Stan Winston.

She was also nominated for a Make-Up Artists and Hair Stylists Guild Award for Best Contemporary Make-Up in a Feature-Length Motion Picture, for her work on the film The Story of Us.

She is a graduate of the Joe Blasco make-up academy.

She has worked on more than 90 films since 1984.
