= Make-Up Artists & Hair Stylists Guild Award for Best Period and/or Character Make-Up in a Television Series, Television Limited or Miniseries or Television New Media Series =

Entertainment award

Make-Up Artists and Hair Stylists Guild Award for Best Period and/or Character Make-Up in a Television Series, Television Limited or Miniseries or Television New Media Series
- Country: United States
- Presented by: Make-Up Artists and Hair Stylists Guild (MUAHS)
- First award: 2000
- Currently held by: Sherri Berman Laurence, Nicky Pattison Illum, Charles Zambrano, Jai Williams; Pose (2021)
- Website: Make-Up Artists & Hair Stylists Guild

The Make-Up Artists and Hair Stylists Guild Award for Best Period and/or Character Make-Up in a Television Series, Television Limited or Miniseries or Television New Media Series is one of the awards given annually to people working in the television industry by the Make-Up Artists and Hair Stylists Guild (MUAHS). It is presented to makeup artists who work in television, whose work has been deemed "best" in a given year. The award was first given in 2000, during the first annual awards, and was given when the awards were brought back in 2014. During the 2001 and 2002 ceremonies, as well as ceremonies from 2015 to 2018, the awards made the distinction between regular series and miniseries/television films. This was amended in 2019, when miniseries nominees were placed alongside continuing series, while television films and specials were given their own category.

== Winners and nominees ==
=== 1990s ===
Year	Program	Episode(s)	Nominees	Network
(1999); 1st	Best Period Make-Up - Television (for a Single Episode of a Regular Series - Sitcom, Drama or Daytime)			
(1999); 1st	The X-Files	"Triangle"	Cheri Montesanto, Kevin Westmore, Laverne Munroe	Fox
(1999); 1st	Freaks and Geeks	"Pilot"	Cynthia Bachman Brown, Patricia Bunch	NBC
(1999); 1st	Providence	"He's Come Undone"	James MacKinnon, Stephanie A. Fowler	NBC
(1999); 1st	Rude Awakening	"Between a Rock Star and Hard Place"	Marie Del Prete	Showtime
(1999); 1st	Best Period Make-Up – Television (for a Mini-Series or Movie of the Week)			
(1999); 1st	And the Beat Goes On: The Sonny and Cher Story		Susan A. Cabral, Matthew W. Mungle, Joe Hailey	ABC
(1999); 1st	The '60s		June Brickman, Tammy Ashmore	NBC
(1999); 1st	Lansky		Marvin G. Westmore, June Westmore, John E. Jackson	HBO
(1999); 1st	Best Character Make-Up - Television (for a Single Episode of a Regular Series - Sitcom, Drama or Daytime)			
(1999); 1st	Mad TV	"507"	Jennifer Aspinall, Felicia Linsky, Ed French	Fox
(1999); 1st	Mad TV	"505"	Jennifer Aspinall, Felicia Linsky, Ed French	Fox
(1999); 1st	The X-Files	"Two Fathers/One Son"	Cheri Montesanto, Kevin Westmore	Fox
(1999); 1st	Best Character Make-Up – Television (for a Mini-Series or Movie of the Week)			
(1999); 1st	A Lesson Before Dying		Douglas Noe	HBO
(1999); 1st	The '60s		June Brickman, Tammy Ashmore	NBC

=== 2000s ===
Year	Program	Episode(s)	Nominees	Network
(2000); 2nd	Best Period Makeup – Television (for a Single Episode of a Regular Series – Sitcom, Drama or Daytime)			
(2000); 2nd	Angel	"Darla"	Dayne Johnson, David DeLeon, Dalia Dokter	The WB
(2000); 2nd	Star Trek: Voyager	"Fair Haven"	Michael Westmore, Ellis Burman Jr., Suzanne Diaz, Tina Hoffman, James Rohland, Scott Wheeler, Natalie Wood	UPN
(2000); 2nd	Will & Grace	"Lows in the Mid-Eighties"	Patricia Bunch, Karen Kawahara	NBC
(2000); 2nd	Best Period Makeup – Television (for a Mini-Series/Motion Picture Made for Television)			
(2000); 2nd	Geppetto		Patricia Messina, Tommy Cole, Charlene Ostermann, Lisa Pharren	ABC
(2000); 2nd	The '70s		Patricia Androff, Keith Sayer	NBC
(2000); 2nd	Jackie Bouvier Kennedy Onassis		Leonard Engelman, Nicole Lapierre	CBS
(2001); 3rd	Best Period Makeup for a Television Series			
(2001); 3rd	Six Feet Under	"Pilot"	Donna-Lou Henderson, Justin Henderson, June Bracken	HBO
(2001); 3rd	Angel	"Offspring"	Donna-Lou Henderson, Justin B. Henderson, Michelle Vittone, Pamela Santori	The WB
(2001); 3rd	Providence	"You Can Count On Me"	James Mackinnon, Rela Martine	NBC
(2001); 3rd	Best Period Makeup for a Television Mini-Series or Movie of the Week			
(2001); 3rd	The Feast of All Saints		Patricia Keighran, Adrienne Little	Showtime
(2001); 3rd	61*		Peter Montagna, Patricia Bunch, Mark Landon	HBO
(2001); 3rd	When Billie Beat Bobby		Patty York, Martha Preciado	ABC
(2001); 3rd	Best Character Makeup for a Television Series			
(2001); 3rd	Mad TV	"707"	Jennifer Aspinall, Randy Westgate, Julie Purcell, Deborah Rutherford	Fox
(2001); 3rd	Alias	"Spirit"	Angela Nogaro, Diana Brown, Gilbert A. Mosko	ABC
(2001); 3rd	Six Feet Under	"Familia"	Donna-Lou Henderson, Todd Masters, Justin B. Henderson	HBO

Year	Program	Nominees	Network
(2002); 4th	Best Period Makeup for a Television Series		
(2002); 4th	American Dreams	Angela Moos, Hayley Cecile, Julie Socash	NBC
(2002); 4th	American Family	Ken Diaz, John Rizzo, Rosie Duprat Fort, N. Kristine Chadwick	PBS
(2002); 4th	Six Feet Under	Donna-Lou Henderson, Justin B. Henderson, Michelle Vittone	HBO
(2002); 4th	Best Character Makeup for a Television Series		
(2002); 4th	Mad TV ('Mo Collins', 'Michael McDonald')	Jennifer Aspinall, Scott Wheeler, Randy Westgate	Fox
(2002); 4th	The Jamie Kennedy Experiment ('Jamie Kennedy')	Annie Maniscalco, Terrell Simon, Ed French	The WB
(2002); 4th	Saturday Night Live ('Jimmy Fallon', 'Amy Poehler')	Louie Zakarian, Andrea Miller	NBC
(2003); 5th	Best Period Makeup for a Television Series		
(2003); 5th	American Dreams	Julie Socash, Kim Perrodin, Bob Scribner, Kandace Westmore	NBC
(2003); 5th	Cold Case	Sheryl Ptak, Peter Montagna, Ken Wensevic	CBS
(2003); 5th	Six Feet Under	Donna-Lou Henderson, Justin B. Henderson, Megan Moore	HBO
(2003); 5th	Best Character Makeup for a Television Series		
(2003); 5th	Gilmore Girls	Marie Del Prete, Malanie J. Romero, Mike Smithson, Debbie Zoller	The WB
(2003); 5th	Mad TV	Jennifer Aspinall, Scott Wheeler, Randy Westgate, David Williams	Fox
(2003); 5th	Six Feet Under	Donna-Lou Henderson, Justin B. Henderson, Megan Moore	HBO

=== 2010s ===
Year	Program	Nominees	Network
(2013); 6th	Best Period and/or Character Makeup in Television and New Media Series		
(2013); 6th	Boardwalk Empire	Michele Paris	HBO
(2013); 6th	Hell on Wheels	Sharon Toohey, Rose Gurevitch	AMC
(2013); 6th	Key & Peele	Scott Wheeler, Suzy Diaz	Comedy Central
(2013); 6th	Best Period and/or Character Makeup in a Television Mini-Series or Motion Picture Made for Television		
(2013); 6th	Behind the Candelabra	Kate Biscoe, Deborah Rutherford	HBO
(2013); 6th	American Horror Story: Coven	Eryn Krueger Mekash, Christien Tinsley	FX
(2013); 6th	Game of Thrones	Paul Engelen, Melissa Lackersteen	HBO
(2014); 7th	Best Period and/or Character Makeup in Television and New Media Series		
(2014); 7th	Downton Abbey	Magi Vaughan, Erika Ökvist	PBS
(2014); 7th	Boardwalk Empire	Michele Paris, Joseph Farulla	HBO
(2014); 7th	Key & Peele	Scott Wheeler, Suzanne Diaz	Comedy Central
(2014); 7th	Mad Men	Lana Horochowski, Ron Pipes	AMC
(2014); 7th	Masters of Sex	Jean Ann Black	Showtime
(2014); 7th	Best Period and/or Character Makeup in a Television Mini-Series or Motion Picture Made for Television		
(2014); 7th	American Horror Story: Freak Show	Eryn Krueger Mekash, Kim Ayers	FX
(2014); 7th	Houdini	Gregor Eckstein	History
(2014); 7th	The Knick	Nicki Ledermann, LuAnn Claps, Stephanie Pasicov	Cinemax
(2014); 7th	The Normal Heart	Eryn Krueger Mekash, Sherri Berman Laurence	HBO
(2014); 7th	Olive Kitteridge	Christien Tinsley, Gerald Quist, Liz Bernstrom	HBO
(2015); 8th	Best Period and/or Character Makeup in Television and New Media Series		
(2015); 8th	Game of Thrones	Jane Walker	HBO
(2015); 8th	Key & Peele	Scott Wheeler, Suzanne Diaz, Michael F. Blake	Comedy Central
(2015); 8th	Masters of Sex	Lana Horochowski, Maurine Burke	Showtime
(2015); 8th	Penny Dreadful	Vincenzo Mastrantonio, Clare Lambe	Showtime
(2015); 8th	Saturday Night Live 40th Anniversary Special	Louie Zakarian, Jason Milani, Amy Tagliamonti	NBC
(2015); 8th	Best Period and/or Character Makeup in a Television Mini-Series or Motion Picture Made for Television		
(2015); 8th	American Horror Story: Hotel	Eryn Krueger Mekash, Kim Ayers, Sarah Tanno	FX
(2015); 8th	Bessie	Debi Young, Sian Richards, Mi Young	HBO
(2015); 8th	Fargo	Gail Kennedy, Joanne Preece, Gunther Schetterer	FX
(2015); 8th	The Secret Life of Marilyn Monroe	Jordan Samuel, Patricia Keighran	Lifetime
(2015); 8th	True Detective	Felicity Bowring, Jay Wejebe, Kathleen Freeman	HBO
(2016); 9th	Best Period and/or Character Makeup in Television and New Media Series		
(2016); 9th	Game of Thrones	Jane Walker, Kay Bilk	HBO
(2016); 9th	Penny Dreadful	Vincenzo Mastrantonio, Clare Lambe	Showtime
(2016); 9th	Saturday Night Live	Louie Zakarian, Jason Milani, Amy Tagliamonti	NBC
(2016); 9th	Westworld	Christien Tinsley, Myriam Arougheti, Rolf John Keppler	HBO
(2016); 9th	Best Period and/or Character Makeup in a Television Mini-Series or Motion Picture Made for Television		
(2016); 9th	The People v. O. J. Simpson: American Crime Story	Eryn Krueger Mekash, Zoe Hay, Heather Plott	FX
(2016); 9th	American Horror Story: Roanoke	Eryn Krueger Mekash, Kim Ayers, Silvina Knight	FX
(2016); 9th	Grease Live!	Zena Shteysel, Angela Moos, Julie Socash	Fox
(2016); 9th	Hairspray Live!	Melanie Hughes, Judy Yonemoto	NBC
(2016); 9th	The Rocky Horror Picture Show: Let's Do the Time Warp Again	Julia Valente, Pipsan Ayotte, Deja Marie Smith	Fox
(2017); 10th	Best Period and/or Character Makeup in Television and New Media Series		
(2017); 10th	Game of Thrones	Jane Walker, Nicola Matthews	HBO
(2017); 10th	The Crown	Ivana Primorac	Netflix
(2017); 10th	GLOW	Lana Horochowski, Maurine Burke	Netflix
(2017); 10th	Saturday Night Live	Louie Zakarian, Jason Milani, Amy Tagliamonti	NBC
(2017); 10th	Stranger Things	Amy L. Forsythe, Jillian Erickson	Netflix
(2017); 10th	Best Period and/or Character Makeup in a Television Mini-Series or Motion Picture Made for Television		
(2017); 10th	Feud: Bette and Joan	Eryn Krueger Mekash, Robin Beauchesne	FX
(2017); 10th	A Christmas Story Live!	Tonia Green, Silvia Leczel	Fox
(2017); 10th	Mudbound	Angie Wells, Carla Brenholtz, Emily Tatum	Netflix
(2017); 10th	Twin Peaks	Debbie Zoller, Richard Redlefsen, Mandi Ann Ruiz	Showtime
(2017); 10th	Wet Hot American Summer: Ten Years Later	Lindsay Garrison, Laura Peyer, Alex Perrone	Netflix
(2018); 11th	Best Period and/or Character Makeup in Television and New Media Series		
(2018); 11th	The Marvelous Mrs. Maisel	Patricia Regan, Claus Lulla, Joseph A. Campayno	Amazon
(2018); 11th	The Assassination of Gianni Versace: American Crime Story	Robin Beauchesne, Silvina Knight, Ana Lozano	FX
(2018); 11th	GLOW	Lana Horochowski, Maurine Burke	Netflix
(2018); 11th	Saturday Night Live	Louie Zakarian, Amy Tagliamonti, Jason Milani	NBC
(2018); 11th	Westworld	Elisa Marsh, Allan A. Apone, Rachel Hoke	HBO
(2019); 12th
(2019); 12th	Fosse/Verdon	Debbie Zoller, David Presto, Jackie Risotto	FX
(2019); 12th	American Horror Story: 1984	Carleigh Herbert, Michael Mekash, Abby Lyle	FX
(2019); 12th	Chernobyl	Daniel Parker, Natasha Nikolic-Dunlop	HBO
(2019); 12th	GLOW	Lana Horochowski, Maurine Burke	Netflix
(2019); 12th	Game of Thrones	Jane Walker, Kay Bilk	HBO

=== 2020s ===
Year	Program	Nominees	Network
(2020); 13th	Best Period and/or Character Make-Up in a Television Series, Television Limited or Miniseries or Television New Media Series		
(2020); 13th	The Queen's Gambit	Daniel Parker	Netflix
(2020); 13th	Bridgerton	Marc Pilcher, Lynda Pearce, Claire Matthews, Lou Bannell	Netflix
(2020); 13th	The Crown	Cate Hall, Emilie Yong	Netflix
(2020); 13th	Hollywood	Eryn Krueger Mekash, Kim Ayers, Kerrin Jackson, Ana Gabriela Quinonez	Netflix
(2020); 13th	The Mandalorian	Brian Sipe, Alexei Dmitriew, Samantha Ward, Carlton Coleman	Disney+
(2020); 13th	Perry Mason	Christien Tinsley, Corinne Foster, Steve Costanza, Gerald Quist	HBO
(2021); 14th
(2021); 14th	Pose	Sherri Berman Laurence, Nicky Pattison Illum, Charles Zambrano, Jai Williams	FX
(2021); 14th	Impeachment: American Crime Story	Robin Beauchesne, Karrieann Heisner Sillay, Angela Moos, Erin LeBre	FX
(2021); 14th	Halston	Patricia Regan, Claus Lulla, Margot Boccia, Joseph A. Campayno	Netflix
(2021); 14th	This Is Us	Zoe Hay, Heather Plott, Tania McComas	NBC
(2021); 14th	WandaVision	Tricia Sawyer, Vasilios Tanis, Regina Little, Jonah Levy	Disney+
(2022); 15th	Bridgerton	Erika Ökvist, Jessie Deol, Sophie Brown, Bethany Long	Netflix
(2022); 15th	Wednesday	Tara McDonald, Nirvana Jalalvand, Gabriela Cretan	Netflix
(2022); 15th	Stranger Things	Amy L. Forsythe, Devin Morales, Lisa Poe, Nataleigh Verrengia	Netflix
(2022); 15th	House of the Dragon	Amanda Knight, Sara Kramer, Heather McCullen	HBO
(2022); 15th	Pam & Tommy	David Williams, Jennifer Aspinall, Dave Snyder, Bill Myer	Hulu
