= Julie Dartnell =

British Oscar-winning makeup artist (born 1963)

- Born: Julie Elizabeth Dartnell; 1 September 1963 (age 62); Essex, England
- Occupation: make-up artist
- Years active: 1989-Present
- Spouse: David Butler
- Children: Tom Butler, Holly Butler

Julie Dartnell (born 1 September 1963 in Stanford-le-Hope, Essex) is a British Oscar-winning make-up artist who won an Oscar at the 2012 Academy Awards for Best Makeup for the film Les Misérables. She shared her Oscar win with Lisa Westcott, the Head of Department for the film.

She has worked on nearly 40 films since 1989, where she made her debut with the BBC version of Prince Caspian.

== Selected filmography ==
- Pan (2015)
- Mortdecai (2015)
- The Grand Budapest Hotel (2014)
- World War Z (2013)
- Les Misérables (2012)
- Captain America: The First Avenger (2011)
- Alice in Wonderland (2010)
- Charlie and the Chocolate Factory (2005)
- Shakespeare in Love (1998)
