= David White (make-up artist) =

British make-up artist

- Born: 1964 (age 61–62); Rustington
- Occupation: make-up artist
- Years active: 1983–present
- Children: E. White, O. White
- Website: http://www.alteredstatesfx.co.uk/about_asfx.htm

David White is a British make-up artist.

He was nominated for three Academy Awards in the Best Makeup and Hairstyling category, in 2015 for Guardians of the Galaxy, in 2020 for Maleficent: Mistress of Evil and most recently in 2025 for his work on Robert Eggers' version of Nosferatu, where he realised the newest version of Count Orlock with his special effects makeup design.

David is the owner of the company Altered States FX.
