= Luisa Abel =

American make-up artist

- Occupation: Make-up artist
- Years active: 1992–present

Luisa Abel is an American make-up artist. She was nominated for an Academy Award in the category Best Makeup and Hairstyling for the film Oppenheimer.

Abel was born and raised in South America, and first worked as a makeup artist in the United Kingdom. She is Hispanic.

== Selected filmography ==
- Charlie Wilson's War (2007)
- This Must Be the Place (2011)
- Interstellar (2014)
- American Sniper (2014)
- Dunkirk (2017)
- The 15:17 to Paris (2018)
- Knives Out (2019)
- Gemini Man (2019)
- Tenet (2020)
- Red Notice (2021)
- Air (2023)
- Oppenheimer (2023)
