= The Eyes of Tammy Faye =

The Eyes of Tammy Faye may refer to:

- The Eyes of Tammy Faye (2000 film), American documentary
- The Eyes of Tammy Faye (2021 film), American drama film based on the documentary
