= Send tape echo echo delay =

Send tape echo echo delay (more commonly known as STEED, alternatively known as single tape echo and echo delay) is a technique used in magnetic tape sound recording to apply a delay effect using tape loops and echo chambers.

In 2006, while publicising his memoir (Here, There, and Everywhere: My Life Recording the Music of The Beatles), recording engineer Geoff Emerick stated that "God only knows" how the effect worked.

== Technique ==
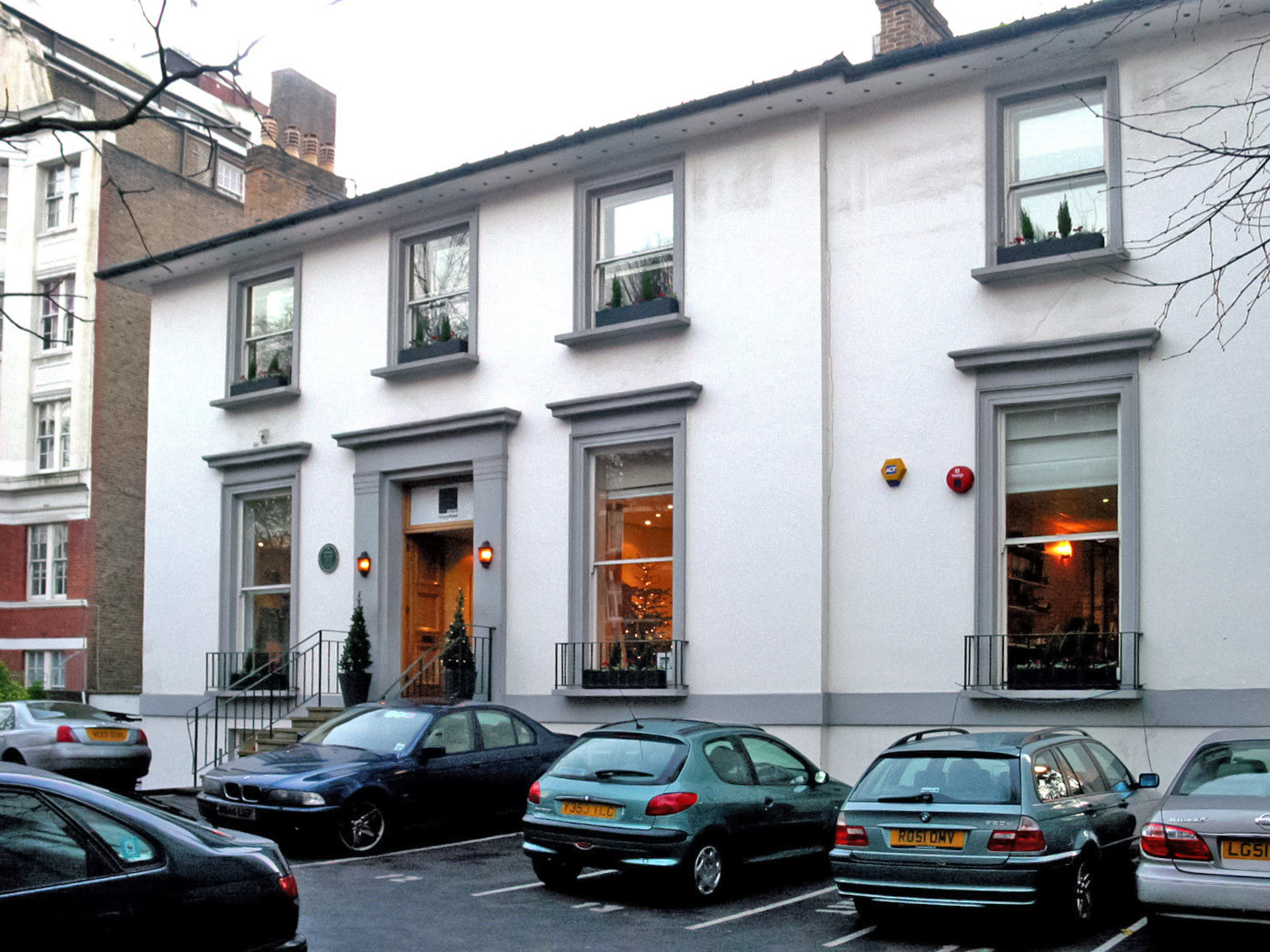
STEED was developed at EMI/Abbey Road Studios, where much of The Beatles' material was produced

The technique was developed at EMI/Abbey Road Studios in the late 1950s, by EMI engineer Gwynne Stock. It involved delaying the recorded (dry) signal, sending it into the studio's echo chamber using a tape machine. The dry signal (without delay) was also sent to the chamber via the tape machine's replay head. The resulting sound was picked up by two condenser microphones. These microphones then fed the wet signal back to the recording console. The amount of feedback could be controlled allowing multiple delays to be sent to the reverb chamber, which could lengthen the effect's decay time.

An identical technique was used for the production of Anthology 1 in 1995, where speakers were used to play the sound within the echo chamber.

== Use ==
One notable example of the use of STEED is on George Harrison's lead vocal on "Everybody's Trying to Be My Baby" (1964). Mark Lewisohn describes the effect as a "vast amount", and likened Harrison's vocal to singing inside a tin can. He notes that some of the musical backing tracks were also affected by the technique due to microphone spill from Harrison's headphones. Other examples of the use of STEED on Beatles recordings include the vocal fermata in "Paperback Writer" (1966), and Paul McCartney's piano on "Birthday" (1968).

The effect was also used on "Revolution 9" (1968), and was used in the mixing of tracks for Anthology 1 in 1995.

== See also ==
- Artificial double tracking, a technique developed by EMI/Abbey Road's Ken Townsend

== Sources ==
- Babiuk, Andy (2002), Beatles Gear, Milwaukee, WI: Backbeat, ISBN 0-87930-731-5
- Beatles Bible (2011), Everybody's Trying To Be My Baby, The Beatles Bible
- Cunningham, Mark (1995), "The Story of The Beatles' Anthology Project", Sound on Sound, Cambridge: SOS Publications
- Fontenot, Robert (2011), "Birthday: The History of This Classic Beatles Song", About.com, New York, NY, archived from the original on 4 March 2016
- Lewisohn, Mark (1989), The Beatles Recording Sessions, New York, NY: Harmony, ISBN 0-517-57066-1
- Marryatt, Tony (2011), Audio Engineering Tips of the Day, Vancouver, BC: Pacific Audio Visual Institute, archived from the original on 2 September 2010
- Mix (2006), "More from Geoff Emerick", Mix Online, New York, NY, archived from the original on 18 September 2012
- Shepherd, John (2003), Continuum Encyclopedia of Popular Music of the World, Volume 1, London: Continuum International Publishing Group, ISBN 0-8264-6321-5
