= University of Beverly Hills =

Defunct, unaccredited, post-secondary school

The University of Beverly Hills is now defunct. UBH was an unaccredited school of arts and sciences which operated in the State of California until 2007. Its main facility was located in Beverly Hills delivering on-site and distance education programs. It currently lacks association with a campus, performing arts center, or laboratory facilities.

== Accreditation status ==
The institution was an unaccredited provider of non-formal adult education, and many considered it to be simply a degree mill since it recognized previous working experience as part of the curriculum, such as the case of UBH programs for actor's training or others such as sports-nutrition practitioner's certicates and related diploma programs.

== Legacy ==
Founded by former president Sacha Nemcov. Operated training sessions in association with the Dominion Herbal College and the New York Film Academy in Los Angeles.
Earl Mindell, author of the Vitamin Bible, claims a Ph.D. degree from this institution.
