= John Christopher (herbalist) =

American herbalist (1909–1983)

John Raymond Christopher

John Raymond Christopher (November 25, 1909 – February 6, 1983) was an American herbalist and naturopath. He was known for his numerous lectures and publications on herbs. He developed over 50 herbal formulas used worldwide, and founded The School of Natural Healing in Springville, Utah.

== Biography ==
Christopher was born to European parents. He was left in a Salt Lake City, Utah orphanage and adopted by Leander and Melissa Christopher. Born with advanced rheumatoid arthritis, he endured excruciating pain as a child, and sometimes walked with a cane or used a wheelchair. He also developed hardening of the arteries, and a nearly fatal case of croup. Doctors of his day stated he would never reach the age of thirty.

As a child, he showed interest in being a doctor who would heal people with natural remedies.

In 1945 he was drafted into the military and was stationed at Fort Lewis, where he was allowed to experiment with herbs. After his military service he moved to Canada, and studied at Dominion Herbal College in Vancouver where he obtained his degree in Naturopathy. He later studied at the now defunct Iowa's Institute of Drugless Therapy and the now defunct Los Angeles Herbal Institute.

He spent time practicing as an N.D. in Olympia, Washington, Salt Lake City, Utah and Evanston, Wyoming.

In 1953, Christopher formed The School of Natural Healing, and began teaching. In 1979, he began publication of a newsletter about using herbs for healing

Christopher created more than 50 herbal formulas, including: Complete Tissue & Bone; Lower Bowel Formula; Blood Stream Formula; Female Reproductive Formula; Super Garlic Immune Formula; Herbal Tooth and Gum Powder; and Hormonal Changease.

Christopher's son, David Christopher, began studying and working with his father, and became the director of the School of Natural Healing in 1979. David furthered the work of his father by creating additional courses and formulas. In 2009, David announced an online version of the School of Natural Healing was being released to honor the centennial of his father's birth.

Several notable herbalists studied under Christopher, including Michael Tierra and Peter Jackson-Main.

== Books by Dr. Christopher ==
- 3 Day Cleanse & Mucusless Diet. ISBN 1-879436-04-3
- Cold Sheet Treatment. ISBN 1-879436-07-8
- Curing the Incurables. ISBN 1-879436-08-6
- Dr. Christopher’s Guide to Colon Health. ISBN 1-879436-20-5
- Every Woman’s Herbal (completed by his family after his death). ISBN 1-879436-10-8
- Herb Syllabus (completed by his family after his death). ISBN 1-879436-05-1
- Herbal Home Health Care. ISBN 1-879436-03-5
- Just What is the Word of Wisdom. ISBN 1-879436-05-1
- Newsletters (found in The Complete Writings of Dr. Christopher CD). ISBN 1-879436-25-6
- Regenerative Diet. ISBN 1-879436-00-0
- School of Natural Healing ISBN 1-879436-01-9
