= Justin Raleigh =

American special make-up effects artist

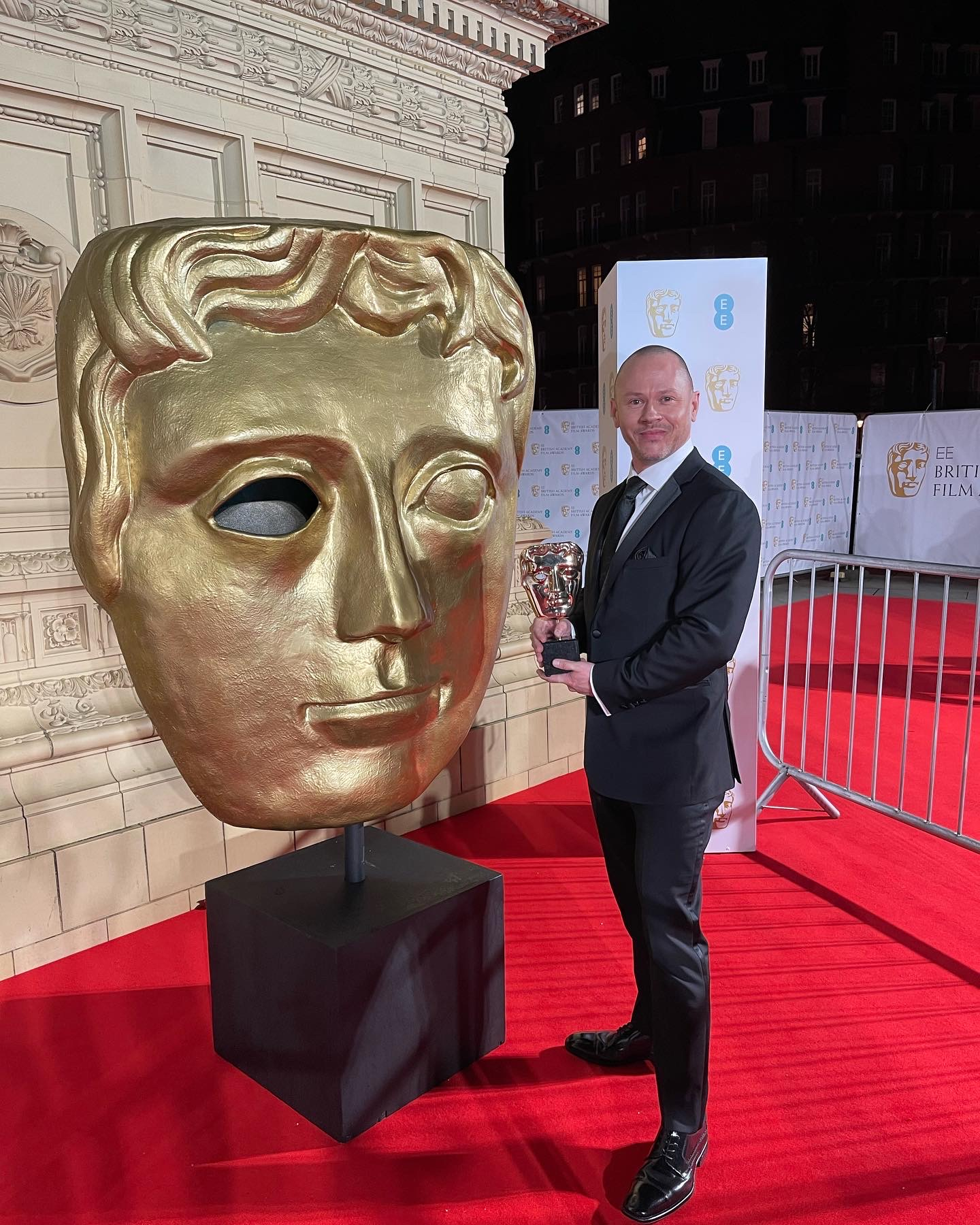
- Raleigh in 2021
- Occupation: Special make-up effects artist

Justin Raleigh is an American special make-up effects artist. He won the Academy Award for Best Makeup and Hairstyling and the BAFTA Award for Best Makeup and Hair for his work on The Eyes of Tammy Faye (2021), alongside Linda Dowds and Stephanie Ingram. He also won a Primetime Emmy Award for prosthetic makeup for American Horror Story: Freak Show in 2015 and has received additional Emmy nominations for The Knick, Westworld and Impeachment: American Crime Story.

Raleigh is the founder and chief executive officer of Fractured FX, a special make-up effects studio whose work includes prosthetics, creature effects, specialty costumes and hybrid practical effects.

His film and television credits include Aquaman, Army of the Dead, The Eyes of Tammy Faye, American Horror Story: Freak Show, The Knick, Westworld and Impeachment: American Crime Story.

== Selected filmography ==
- Aquaman and the Lost Kingdom (2023)
- Kimi (2022)
- Impeachment: American Crime Story (2021)
- Midnight Mass (2021)
- The Eyes of Tammy Faye (2021)
- Army of the Dead (2021)
- Sweet Tooth (2021)
- Penny Dreadful: City of Angels (2020)
- Westworld (2018–2020)
- Swamp Thing (2019)
- Big Little Lies (2019)
- Annabelle Comes Home (2019)
- Brightburn (2019)
- Aquaman (2018)
- Godless (2017)
- The Conjuring 2 (2016)
- The Last Witch Hunter (2015)
- The Knick (2014–2015)
- American Horror Story: Freak Show (2014–2015)
- 300: Rise of an Empire (2014)
- The Conjuring (2013)
- Insidious: Chapter 2 (2013)
- True Blood (2011–2012)
- Sucker Punch (2011)
- Insidious (2010)
- Splinter (2008)
- Jarhead (2005)
- Big Fish (2003)

== Awards and nominations ==
Year	Award	Category	Work	Result	Ref.
2022	Academy Awards	Best Makeup and Hairstyling	The Eyes of Tammy Faye	Won	
2022	British Academy Film Awards	Best Makeup and Hair	The Eyes of Tammy Faye	Won	
2022	Primetime Emmy Awards	Outstanding Prosthetic Makeup	Impeachment: American Crime Story	Nominated	
2022	Children's and Family Emmy Awards	Outstanding Special Effects Costumes, Hair and Makeup	Sweet Tooth	Nominated	
2020	Primetime Emmy Awards	Outstanding Prosthetic Makeup for a Series, Limited Series, Movie or Special	Westworld	Nominated	
2018	Primetime Emmy Awards	Outstanding Prosthetic Makeup for a Series, Limited Series, Movie or Special	Westworld	Nominated	
2015	Primetime Emmy Awards	Outstanding Prosthetic Makeup for a Series, Limited Series, Movie or Special	American Horror Story: Freak Show	Won	
2015	Primetime Emmy Awards	Outstanding Prosthetic Makeup for a Series, Limited Series, Movie or Special	The Knick	Nominated	
