= Linda Dowds =

Canadian make-up artist

- Born: Canada
- Occupation: Make-up artist

Linda Dowds is a Canadian make-up artist. A member of the Academy of Motion Picture Arts and Sciences, Academy of Television Arts & Sciences and the British Academy of Film and Television Arts, she won an Academy Award in the category Best Makeup and Hairstyling for the film The Eyes of Tammy Faye.

In addition to her Academy Award win, she won three Primetime Emmy Awards and was nominated for another one in the category Outstanding Makeup for her work on the television program The Kennedys and True Detective and also the television film Grey Gardens. She was also nominated for a Canadian Screen Award in the category Achievement in Make-Up for the film Mama.

== Selected filmography ==
- The Eyes of Tammy Faye (2021; co-won with Stephanie Ingram and Justin Raleigh)
