= FreeLife =

American multi-level marketing company

FreeLife International
- Type: Private
- Industry: Multi-level marketing
- Founded: 1995
- Defunct: 2017
- Headquarters: Phoenix, Arizona
- Key people: Ray Faltinsky; Kevin Fournier
- Products: Himalayan Goji Juice

FreeLife International, an American multi-level marketing company established in 1995 by Ray Faltinsky and Kevin Fournier, sold dietary supplements. In 2017, it was acquired by Youngevity International Corporation.

== History ==
Ray Faltinsky and Kevin Fournier were backed by a group of investors that included family, friends and Anson Beard, previously of Morgan Stanley and Dean Witter.

FreeLife includes operations in Australia, Bermuda, Canada, Hong Kong, Macau, Mexico, New Zealand, Philippines, Puerto Rico, Singapore, Trinidad & Tobago, and the United States.

Over several years, the company's spokesperson Earl Mindell made claims of unfounded health benefits from consuming the company's goji juice product called "Himalayan Goji Juice", implicating anti-cancer and anti-aging properties. Specifically in 2007, Mindell's statements were made during a hidden camera investigation by the Canadian Broadcasting Corporation whose reporter, Wendy Mesley, questioned the supposed anti-cancer properties of Himalayan Goji Juice. During the same investigation, it was found that Mindell's Ph.D. qualification was in fact invalid, as had been questioned a decade before. Mindell's Ph.D. was conferred in 1985 by Pacific Western University, an unaccredited distance-learning institution with no campus. It was proven by subsequent studies that Mindell's claims were unfounded and based only on preliminary laboratory research on cancer cell inhibition, a finding that was never confirmed in other laboratory or human studies. As a result, FreeLife severed its relationship with Mindell in 2008, but was further associated with him as a codefendant in a 2009 legal case (below).

In 2008, a FreeLife-funded study conducted on its own employees found that the use of their goji products increased subjective feelings of well-being. Questions on these findings were later raised due to poor study design and potential conflict of interest between FreeLife, the employed subjects used and the investigators who did the study.

In 2017, Youngevity acquired Freelife and L'dara through the acquisition of Sorvana International company.

== Products and marketing ==
At first, FreeLife's product line consisted of supplements, shampoo and personal care products. In October 2003, FreeLife changed its product line to focus on a juice made from goji (Lycium barbarum) and sold under the product name Himalayan Goji Juice, and a newer product named GoChi. The company and its goji juice were covered in the media around 2007-8 when the company's marketing messages were questioned.

FreeLife products are sold through multi-level marketing to customers by independent salespeople who are paid commissions on their sales and the sales of their downline.

== Burge et al. vs FreeLife ==
On May 29, 2009, a class action lawsuit was filed against FreeLife International, Inc. in the United States District Court of Arizona. This lawsuit alleged false claims, misrepresentations, false and deceptive advertising and other issues regarding FreeLife's Himalayan Goji Juice, GoChi, and TaiSlim products. This lawsuit sought remedies for consumers who have purchased these products in recent years.

A settlement agreement was reached on April 28, 2010, where FreeLife will take steps to ensure that its goji products are not marketed as "unheated" or "raw", and made a contribution to an educational organization.

== See also ==
- Herbal supplements
