= Stephanie Ingram =

Canadian make-up artist

- Occupation: Make-up artist

Stephanie Ingram is a Canadian make-up artist. She won an Academy Award in the category Best Makeup and Hairstyling for the film The Eyes of Tammy Faye.

== Selected filmography ==
- The Eyes of Tammy Faye (2021; co-won with Linda Dowds and Justin Raleigh)
