= Wes Jetton =

American actor (born 1988)

- Born: September 5, 1988 (age 37); Atlanta, Georgia, U.S.
- Education: New York University; Tisch School of the Arts; BFA Theatre
- Occupations: Actor; Studio owner
- Years active: 2016–present
- Website: www.wesjetton.com

Wes Jetton is a Eurasian American actor. His work includes appearances in television shows such as Chicago Fire (2022), FBI (2023), and Echo (2023–2024). He has also been involved in film projects such as The Eyes of Tammy Faye (2021), where he worked alongside Jessica Chastain, and A Family Affair (2024), starring Nicole Kidman and Zac Efron.

== Early life ==
Wes Jetton was born and raised in Atlanta, Georgia. Jetton started acting professionally at the age of 15. In his first commercial, he played a young Yao Ming for the 2003 NBA All-Star Game. At a young age, Jetton also appeared in Kenny Leon's The Wiz with the True Colors Theater in Atlanta.

Upon graduating high school, he moved to New York City where he received a BFA from New York University's Tisch School of the Arts. Jetton spent the next 10 years performing off-Broadway and being a part of the Fellowship Company at the Williamstown Theatre Festival.

== Career ==
Since then, Jetton has performed in various film and television projects, including: The Walking Dead: World Beyond, The First Lady, Ozark, and The Resident. Jetton co-owns a company called The Working Actor Group (TWAG) who acts as a resource for other artists and creatives.

== Filmography ==
=== Film ===
Year	Title	Role
2021	The Eyes of Tammy Faye	Male Nurse
2022	High Expectations	Mike
2024	Sonny Boy	Matt Caso
2024	Harold and the Purple Crayon	Teacher
2024	A Family Affair	Emmanuel

=== Television ===
Year	Title	Role	Notes
2016, 2017	Fatal Attraction	Jon Alfaro / Terrence George	2 episodes
2016, 2017	Homicide Hunter: Lt Joe Kenda	Manuel Gaitan / Leo Arguello	2 episodes
2017	Nashville	Reporter	Episode: "(Now and Then There's) a Fool Such as I"
2017	Murder Calls	Allen Andrade	Episode: "Lost Angel"
2018	The Haunting of Hill House	Addict	Episode: "The Twin Thing"
2018	Kansas City	Man	TV movie
2019	Dynasty	Diego	Episode: "Filthy Games"
2019	Dear Santa, I Need a Date	Hunter	TV movie
2020	Manhunt	ATF Bomb Tech	Episode: "Centbomb"
2020	Stargirl	Nurse	Episode: "Brainwave"
2020	USS Christmas	Jeff Rogers	TV movie
2021	The Walking Dead: World Beyond	Robin	5 episodes
2021	The Resident	McDonnell	2 episodes
2022	Chicago Fire	Officer Hedrick	Episode: "Keep You Safe"
2022	Ozark	Jr. Agent	Episode: "Pick a God and Pray"
2022	The First Lady	Activist #3	Episode: "Shout Out"
2022	Panhandle	Buzzcut	Episode: "To Bell or Not to Bell?"
2023	FBI	Ethan Chen	Episode: "Protégé"
2023	Found	Jesse Winfield	Episode: "Missing While Addicted"
2023–2024	Echo	Woody	2 episodes
