= Pacific Audio Visual Institute =

Former school in Vancouver, Canada

- Motto: "Be who you are. Do what you love"
- Type: Private vocational
- Established: 2000
- Location: 34 West 8th Avenue; Vancouver, British Columbia; V5Y 1M7; 49.2637°N 123.1057°W
- Nickname: PAVI
- Website: www.pacificav.com

Pacific Audio Visual Institute (PAVI) was a private educational institution that specializes in music production and music management located in Vancouver, British Columbia, Canada. PAVI offers one-year diploma programs in Audio Engineering & Production and Music Business Management. PAVI differs from other institutions in that classes are taught within an operating, full-service, professional studio complex. Pacific Audio Visual Institute is accredited by the Private Career Training Institutions Agency of British Columbia. PAVI has recently been Awarded British Columbia’s Education Quality Assurance Designation. The EQA helps identify which provincial post-secondary institutions have met government assurance standards and offer consumer protection. Each year PAVI awards more than $100,000 in scholarships. Students have the opportunity to gain practical experience in their industry through PAVI's internship placement program. The school offers assistance and resources for International Students. with Citizenship and Immigration Canada.

== Programs ==
=== Audio Engineering & Production ===
The Audio Engineering & Production (AEP) program offers provides hands-on training in music production and sound engineering. Students learn in a commercial recording studio with professional audio engineers and instructors who have active careers in the industry. Courses include Recording, Overdubbing, Mixing, Record Production, Electronic Music, Digital Audio Workstation, Audio for Video, Live Sound, Studio Design, Digital Signal Processing and Career Management.

=== Music Business Management ===
Music Business Management (MBM) program provides the education necessary for a business career in the entertainment industry. Students learn hands-on with industry professionals. Courses include Marketing & Promotion, Independent Label, Artist Development and Management, Industry Contracts, Record Production, Music Publishing, Social Media Management. This program also offers a Music Video course and students have full access to the school's film gear for their own projects.

PAVI Recording Studios

PAVI Film Studios
