= High Expectations (film) =

- Directed by: Jonathan Southard; Christopher D. White
- Screenplay by: Kristinn Thordarson Christopher D. White
- Produced by: Eugene Brady; Stephen R. Campanella; Warren Ostergard; William B. Steakley; Kristiann Thordarson; Christopher D. White
- Starring: Kelsey Grammer; Taylor Gray; Ally Brooke
- Cinematography: Bryan Koss
- Edited by: David Dodson
- Release date: April 7, 2022
- Running time: 96 minutes
- Country: United States
- Language: English

High Expectations is an American film written and directed by Christopher D. White, Jonathan Southard and Kristinn Thordarson. The film stars Kelsey Grammer, Taylor Gray and Ally Brooke.

== Plot ==
The story follows Jack as he works to join a rival soccer team after his father, a former soccer star and current club owner, cuts him from the team. Matters are complicated by the fact that his brother is also on the team he is forced to leave and eventually compete against.

== Cast ==
- Kelsey Grammer as Coach Harrison Davis
- Taylor Gray as Jack
- Tony Demil as Wally
- Brook Sil as Sarah
- Ally Brooke as Sofia
- Josh Ventura as Dennis
- Ben VanderMey as Greg
- Shaun MacLean as Paul Davis
- Andi Matheny as Joan
- Greg Corbett as Coach Creekmore
- Tamika Shannon as Receptionist
- Mallory Hoff as Female reporter
- Jackson Geach as Jerry
- Wes Jetton as Mike
- Michele Manchester as Tawny
- Alec Lipscomb as young Sam
- Briana Scurry as Herself
- Samuel R Moody as young Jack
- Rebekah Babelay as Bridget
- Gloria Bishop as Restaurant Patron
- Maximo Duran as Soccer fan
- Chris TC Edge as Bar Patron
- Wes Jetton as Mike

== Production ==
Principal photography took place in Georgia according to COVID-19 safety protocols and guidelines. The film is directed by Jonathan Southard, with executive production by Kristinn Thordarson and Chris White. A significant amount of the film was shot on location in Canton, Georgia; including Downtown Kitchen, which is featured throughout the film. On January 17, 2023, High Expectations released to on-demand streaming services, and on February 28, 2023, the film was released on DVD.
