= Goji =

Fruit of Lycium barbarum

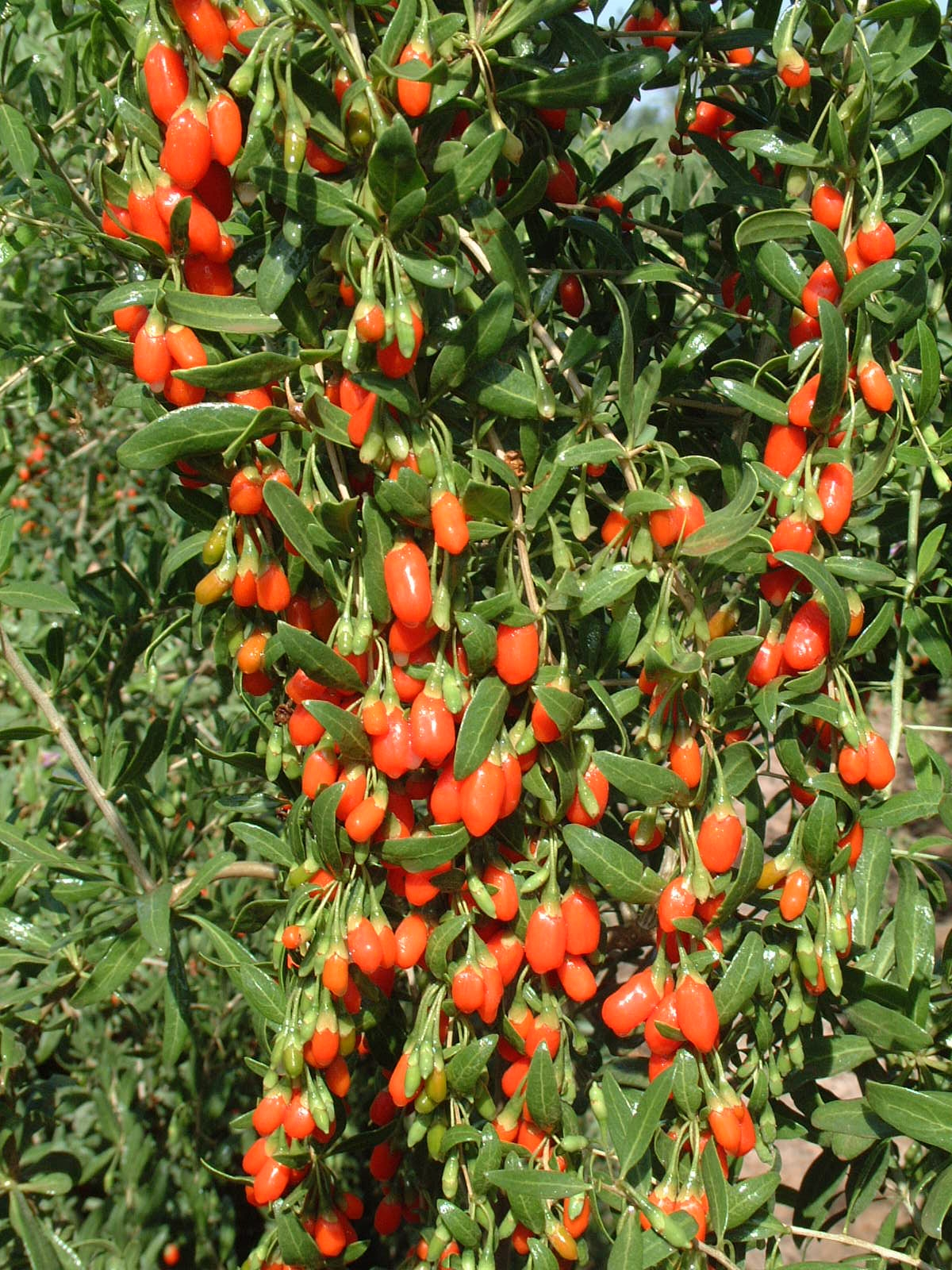
Lycium barbarum berries (Tibetan goji) from Ningxia

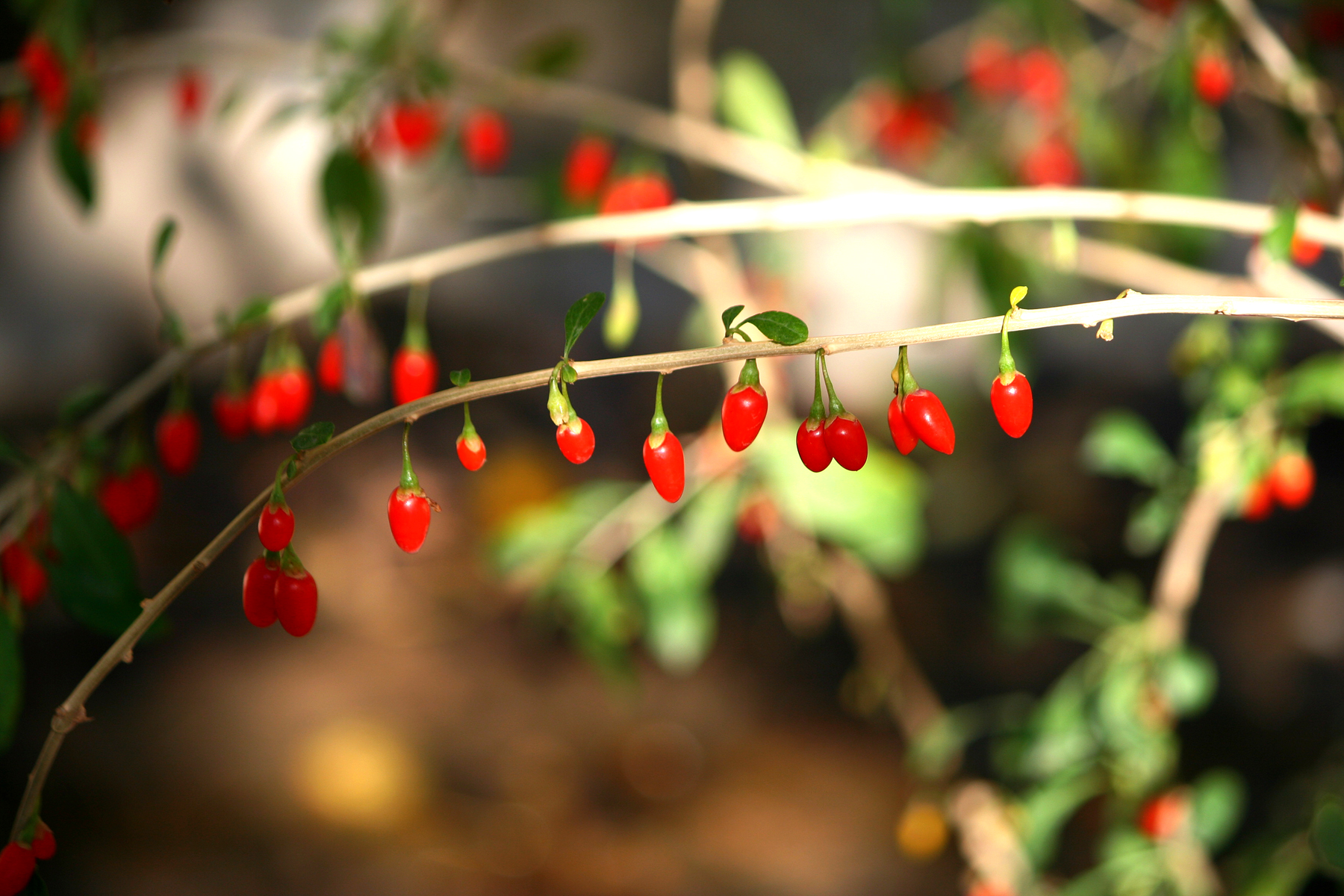
Lycium chinense berries (Chinese wolfberry)

Goji (Chinese: 枸杞, romanized: gǒuqǐ), goji berry, or wolfberry, is the fruit of either Lycium barbarum or Lycium chinense, two closely related species of boxthorn in the nightshade family, Solanaceae. The two species are similar, but can be distinguished by differences in taste and sugar content. Both Lycium species are native to East Asia, and have been long used in traditional Chinese cuisine. In the United States, varieties of the genus are given the common names, desert-thorn; Berlandier's wolfberry is used for Lycium berlandieri. Goji berries are primarily cultivated in the Ningxia and Xinjiang autonomous regions of China.

The fruit has also been an ingredient in East Asian traditional medicine, namely traditional Chinese, Japanese, and Korean medicine since at least the 3rd century AD. In pharmacopeias, the fruit of the plant is called by the Latin name lycii fructus and the leaves are called herba lycii.

Since about 2000, dried goji berries and associated powder and juice products have become common in developed countries as snack foods or supposed alternative medicine remedies, extending from exaggerated and unproven claims about their health benefits.

== Etymology and naming ==
The genus name Lycium was assigned by Linnaeus in 1753. The Latin name lycium is derived from the Greek word λύκιον (lykion), used by Pliny the Elder (23–79) and Pedanius Dioscorides (ca. 40–90) for a plant known as dyer's buckthorn, which was probably a Rhamnus species. The Greek word refers to the ancient region of Lycia (Λυκία) in Anatolia, where that plant grew.

The common English name, wolfberry, has an unknown origin. It may have arisen from the mistaken assumption that the Latin name Lycium was derived from Greek λύκος (lycos), meaning "wolf".

In the English-speaking world, the name goji berry has been used since around 2000. The word goji is an approximation of the pronunciation of 枸杞 (pinyin: gǒuqǐ), the name for the berry-producing plant Lycium chinense in several Chinese dialects. In Japanese, 枸杞 is written and pronounced クコ (kuko).

In technical botanical nomenclature, Lycium barbarum is called matrimony vine, while Lycium chinense is Chinese desert-thorn. In the United States, various common names are used for Lycium species and varieties, such as desert-thorn, boxthorn, matrimony vine, and wolfberry.

== Uses ==
=== Traditional East Asian cuisine ===
Young wolfberry shoots and leaves are harvested commercially as a leaf vegetable. The berries are used in dishes as either a garnish or a source of sweetness.

=== Food ===
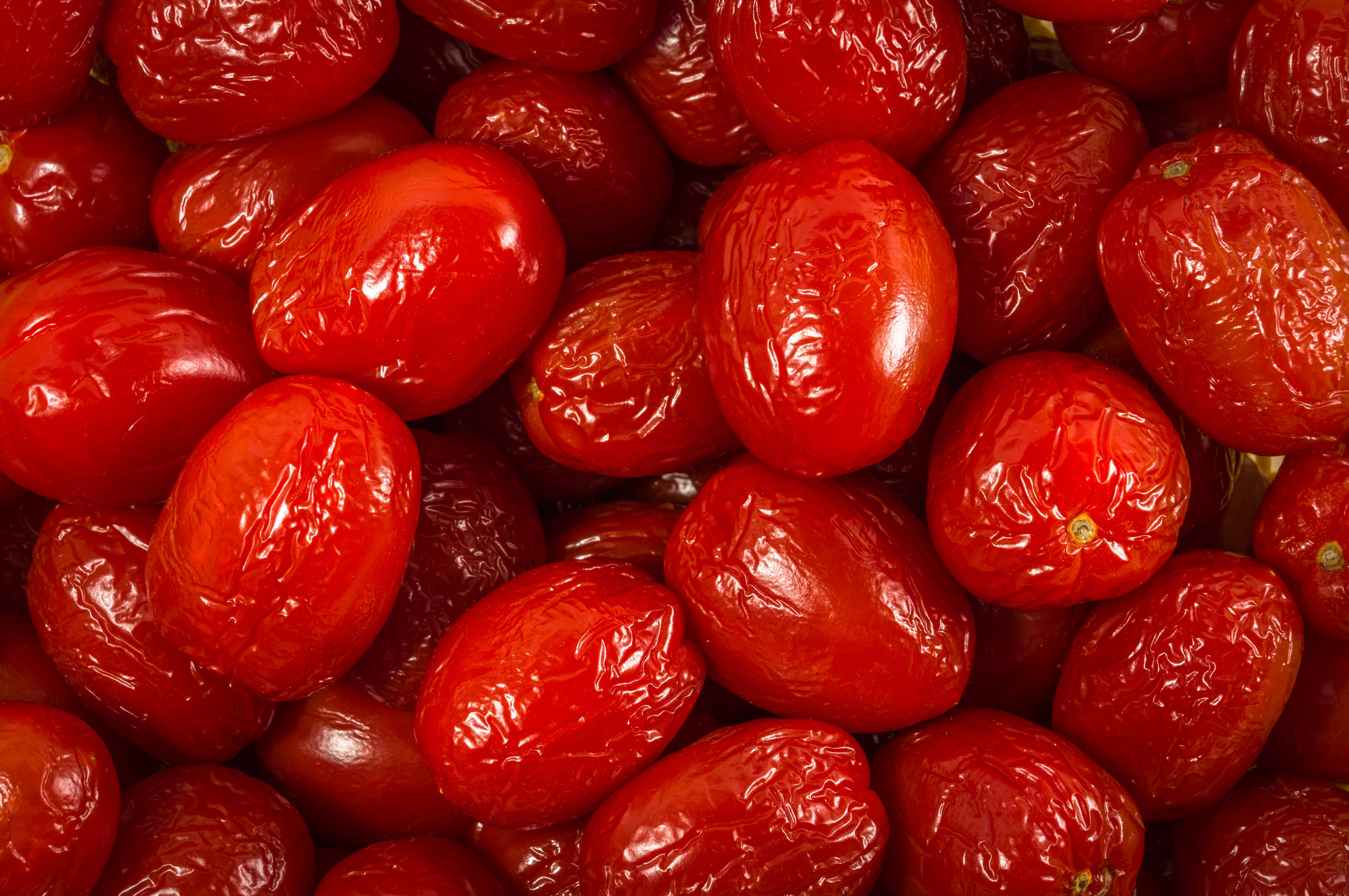
Fresh goji berries (the wrinkling is due to postharvest dehydration)

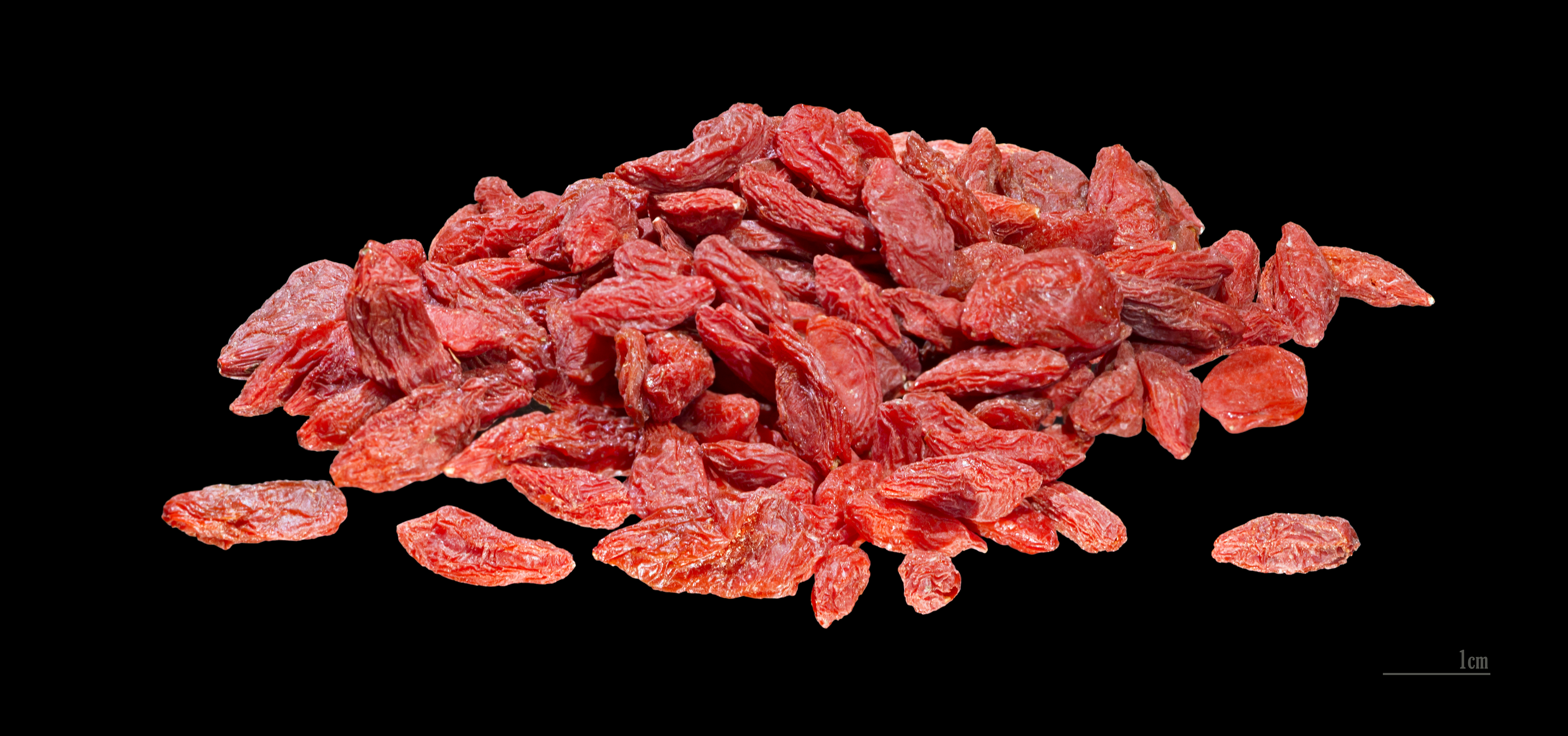
Dried goji berries

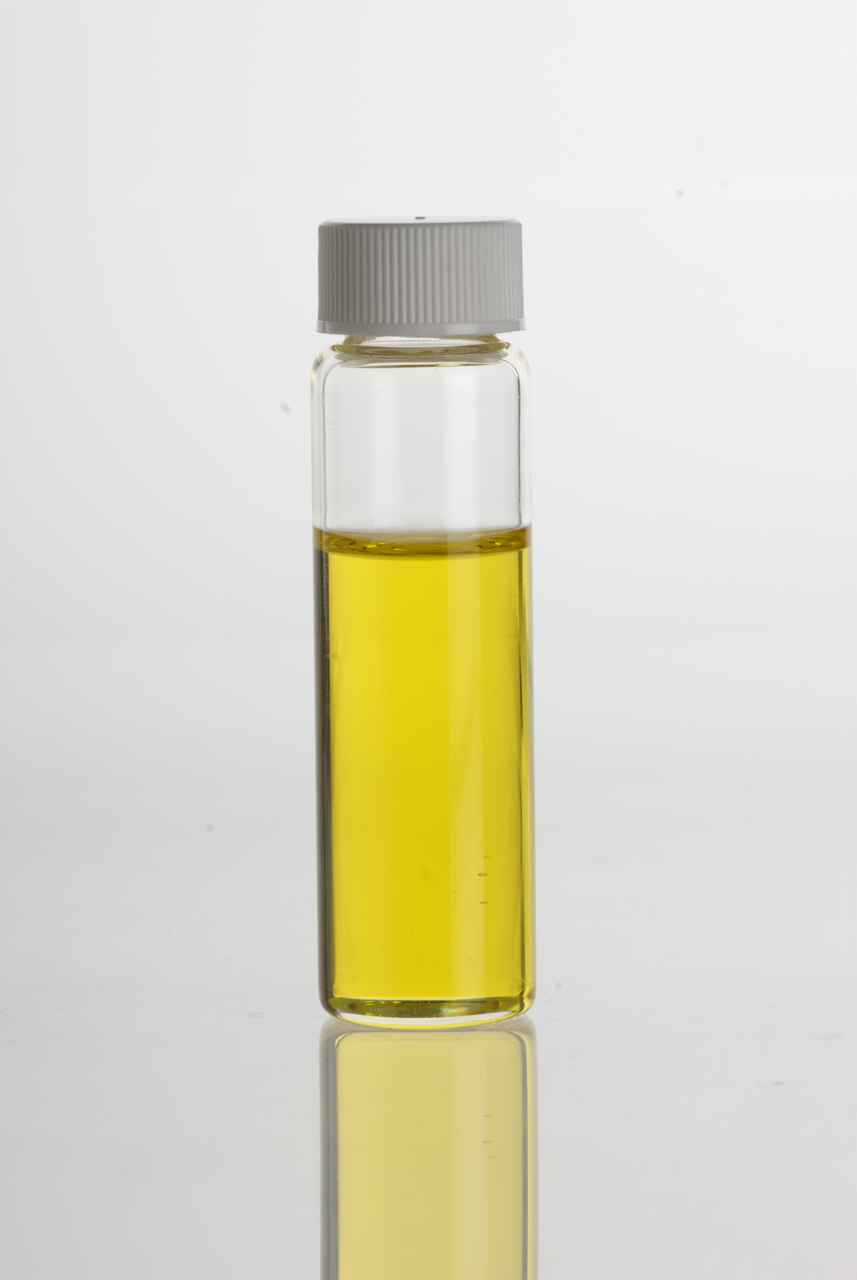
Oil extracted from the seeds of Lycium barbarum

Since the early 21st century, the dried fruit, occasionally compared to raisins, has been marketed as a health food, with unsupported health claims about its benefits. In the wake of those claims, dried and fresh goji berries were included in many snack foods and food supplements, such as granola bars. There are products of whole and ground wolfberry seeds and seed oil.

== Marketing controversies ==
Exaggerated claims about the health benefits of goji berry and derived products have triggered strong reactions from government regulatory agencies. In 2019–2020, the U.S. Food and Drug Administration (FDA) placed two goji product distributors on notice with warning letters about unproven therapeutic benefits. The advertisers' statements were in violation of the United States Food, Drug and Cosmetic Act [21 USC/321 (g)(1)] because they "establish[ed] the product as a drug intended for use in the cure, mitigation, treatment, or prevention of disease" when goji ingredients have had no such scientific evaluation. Additionally stated by the FDA, the goji products are "not generally recognized as safe and effective for the referenced conditions" and therefore must be treated as a "new drug" under Section 21(p) of the Act. New drugs may not be legally marketed in the United States without prior approval of the FDA.

In January 2007, marketing statements for a goji juice product were the subject of an investigative report by consumer advocacy program Marketplace produced by Canadian public broadcaster CBC. In the interview, Earl Mindell (then working for direct-marketing company FreeLife International, Inc.) falsely claimed the Memorial Sloan-Kettering Cancer Center in New York had completed clinical studies showing that use of wolfberry juice would prevent 75% of human breast cancer cases.

Among the extreme claims used to market goji berries or its juice, often referred to as a "superfruit", is the unsupported story that a Chinese man named Li Qing Yuen, who was said to have consumed wolfberries daily, lived to the age of 256 years (1677–1933). This claim originated in a 2003 booklet by Mindell, who also claimed goji had anti-cancer properties. The booklet contained false and unverified claims.

On 29 May 2009, a class action lawsuit was filed against FreeLife in the United States District Court of Arizona. This lawsuit alleged false claims, misrepresentations, false and deceptive advertising, and other issues regarding FreeLife's Himalayan Goji Juice, GoChi, and TaiSlim products. This lawsuit sought remedies for consumers who had purchased the products over the years. A settlement agreement was reached on 28 April 2010, where FreeLife took steps to ensure that its goji products were not marketed as "unheated" or "raw", and made a contribution to an educational organization.

As with many other novel "health" foods and supplements, the lack of clinical evidence and poor quality control in the manufacture of consumer products prevent goji from being clinically recommended or applied.

== Composition and research ==
Because of the numerous effects claimed by traditional medicine, there has been considerable basic research to investigate the biological properties of the fruit phytochemicals. The composition of the fruits, seeds, roots, and other constituents has been analyzed, and extracts are under study. Constituents include carotenoids, polysaccharides (comprising 30% of the pulp), vitamins, fatty acids, and peptidoglycans. Various polyphenols occur in the fruit, leaves, and root bark.

One monograph indicated that consuming goji for three months or longer may improve cardiometabolic risk factors in healthy Chinese adults, although there was only low-quality evidence for such effects. A limited analysis of four studies concluded that healthy Chinese adults who consumed dried goji berries, juice or capsules for 4-16 weeks had slightly lower blood triglyceride levels and higher HDL cholesterol levels.

== Safety ==
=== Interaction with drugs ===
In vitro testing suggests that unidentified wolfberry phytochemicals in goji tea may inhibit metabolism of medications, such as those processed by the cytochrome P450 liver enzymes, including such drugs as warfarin.

=== Pesticide and fungicide residues ===
Organochlorine pesticides are conventionally used in commercial wolfberry cultivation to mitigate infestation by insects. China's Green Food Standard, administered by the Chinese Ministry of Agriculture's China Green Food Development Center, permits some pesticide and herbicide use. Agriculture in the Tibetan Plateau (where many "Himalayan" or "Tibetan"-branded berries supposedly originate) conventionally uses fertilizers and pesticides, making organic claims for berries originating there dubious.

Since the early 21st century, high levels of insecticide residues (including fenvalerate, cypermethrin, and acetamiprid) and fungicide residues (such as triadimenol and isoprothiolane), have been detected by the United States Food and Drug Administration in some imported wolfberries and wolfberry products of Chinese origin, leading to the seizure of these products.

=== Pest control ===
Use of botanical pesticides (particularly eucalyptus oil), surfactant adjuvants, and aphid parasitoids are employed to control aphids and powdery mildew on goji crops.

== Cultivation and commercialization ==
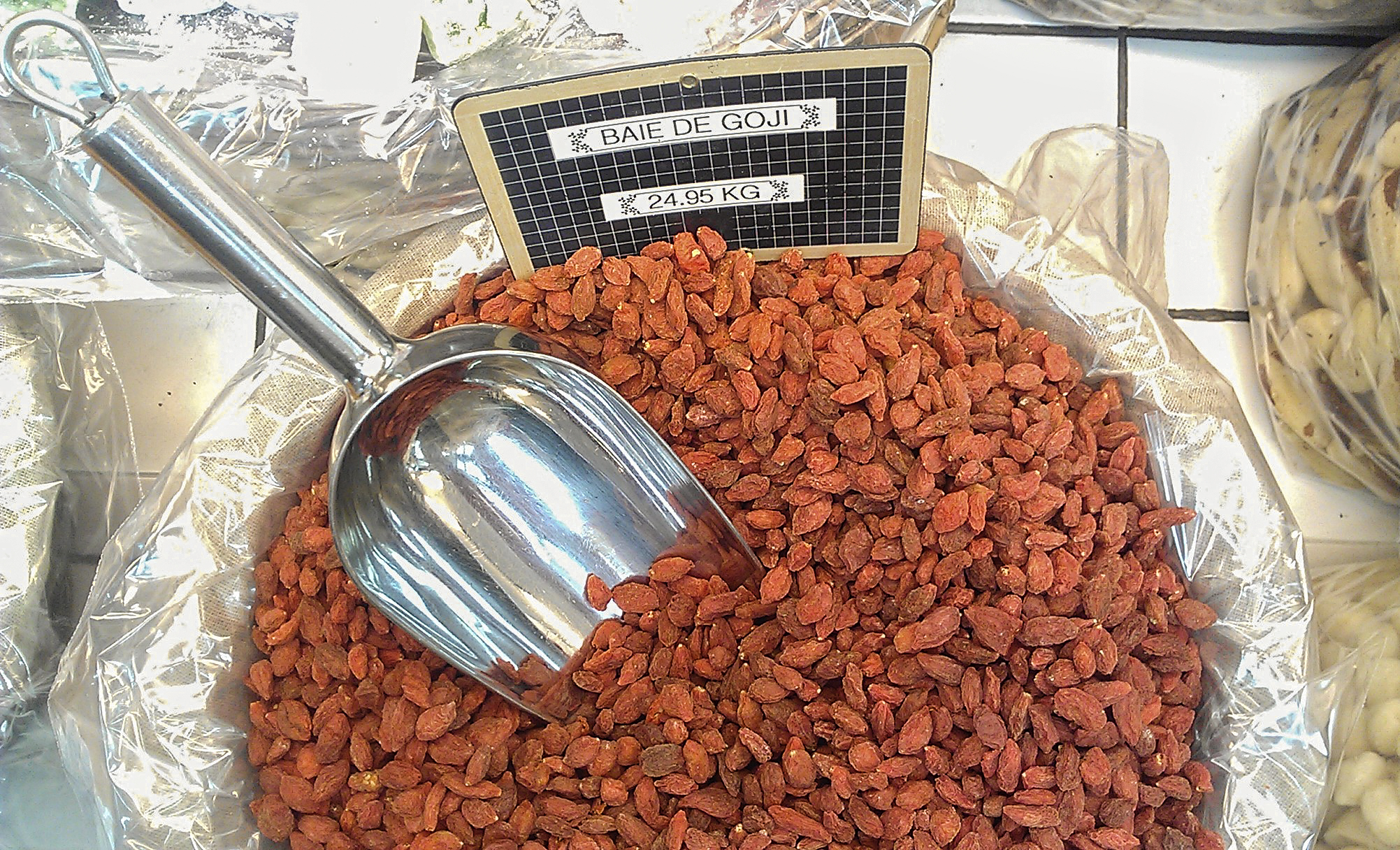
Dried goji berries on sale in a market in France

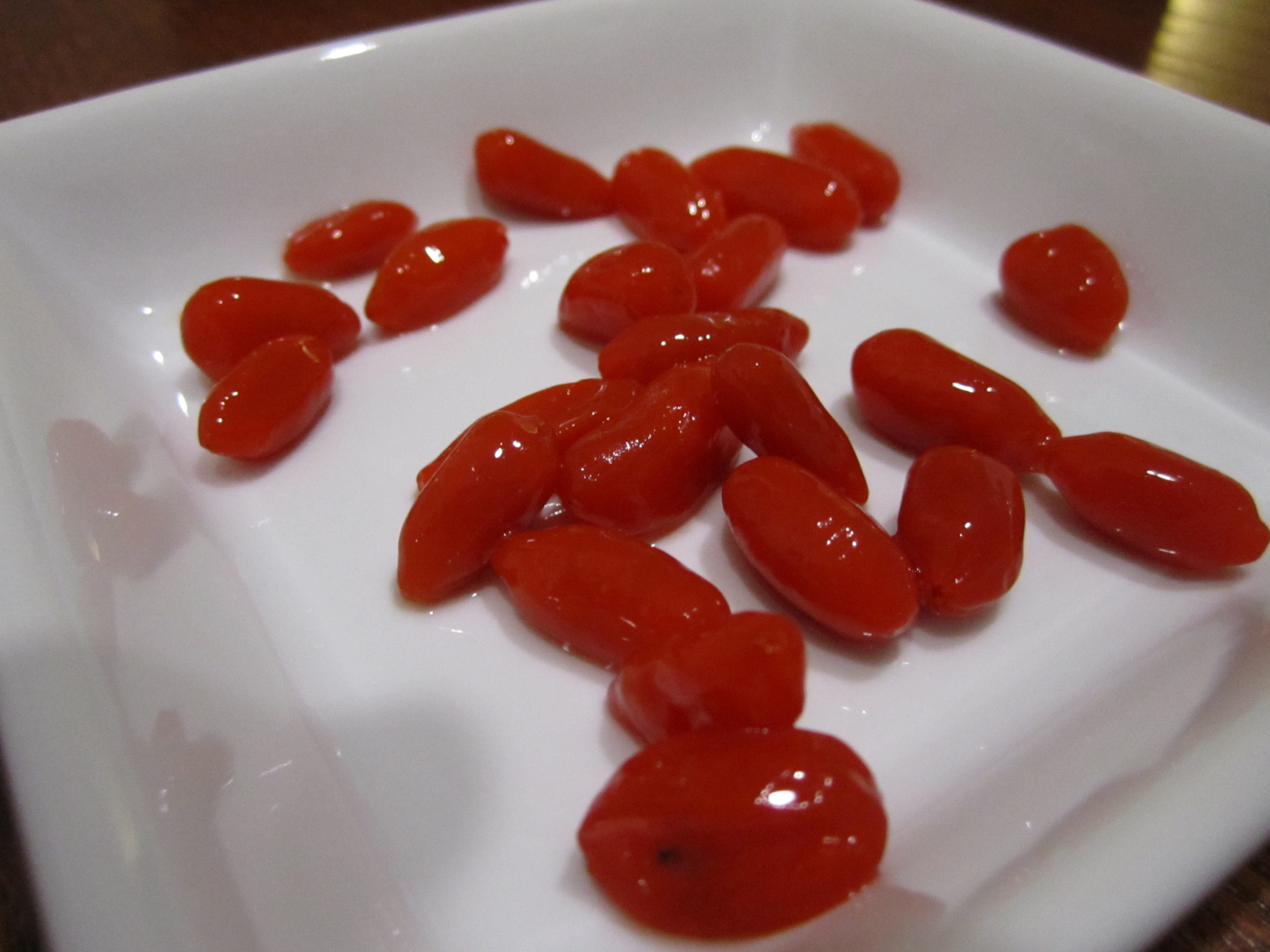
Defrosted goji berries

Wolfberries are most often sold in dried form.

When ripe, the oblong, red berries are tender and must be picked or shaken from the vine into trays to avoid spoiling. The fruits are preserved by drying them in full sun on open trays or by mechanical dehydration, employing a progressively increasing series of heat exposure over 48 hours.

=== China ===
China is the main supplier of wolfberry products globally, with 2023 production derived from a cultivation area of 325,000 mu – about 21,667 ha (53,540 acres) – creating a national wolfberry economy of 29 billion yuan (approximately US $4.2 billion). Some 61% of commercially produced wolfberries in China comes from L. barbarum plantations in the Ningxia region, mainly in Zhongning County. Goji cultivation also occurs in Gansu, Qinghai Province, and the Haixi Mongol and Tibetan Autonomous Prefecture.

The main berry products for export are manufactured beverages, juice concentrate, dried berries, snacks, and freeze-dried juice powder and berries.

Ningxia goji has been cultivated along the fertile floodplains of the Yellow River over centuries. The region has developed an industrial association of growers, processors, marketers, and scholars of wolfberry cultivation to promote the berry's commercial and export potential. Ningxia goji berries, the variety used by practitioners of traditional Chinese medicine, are celebrated annually with a festival.

=== United Kingdom ===
Lycium barbarum had been introduced in the United Kingdom in the 1730s by The Duke of Argyll, but the plant was mostly used for hedges and decorative gardening.

The UK Food Standards Agency (FSA) had initially placed goji berry in the Novel Foods list. That classification would have required authorisation from the European Council and Parliament for marketing. However, on 18 June 2007, the FSA concluded that there was a significant history of consumption of the fruit before 1997, indicating its safety, and thus removed it from the list.

=== Canada and United States ===
In the first decade of the 21st century, farmers in Canada and the United States began cultivating goji on a commercial scale to meet potential markets for fresh berries, juice, and processed products.

=== Australia ===
Australia imports most of its goji berries from China, due to how expensive the Australian labour force is in comparison with the countries that have the largest share of the current market.

== See also ==
- Gouqi jiu
