= The Eyes of Tammy Faye (2021 film) =

2021 film by Michael Showalter

- Official release poster
- Directed by: Michael Showalter
- Screenplay by: Abe Sylvia
- Based on: The Eyes of Tammy Faye by Fenton Bailey; Randy Barbato
- Produced by: Jessica Chastain; Kelly Carmichael; Rachel Shane; Gigi Pritzker
- Starring: Jessica Chastain; Andrew Garfield; Cherry Jones; Vincent D'Onofrio
- Cinematography: Mike Gioulakis
- Edited by: Mary Jo Markey
- Music by: Theodore Shapiro
- Production companies: Freckle Films; MWM Studios; Semi-Formal Productions
- Distributed by: Searchlight Pictures
- Release dates: September 12, 2021 (TIFF); September 17, 2021 (United States)
- Running time: 126 minutes
- Country: United States
- Language: English
- Box office: $2.7 million

The Eyes of Tammy Faye is a 2021 American biographical drama film directed by Michael Showalter from a screenplay by Abe Sylvia, based on the 2000 documentary of the same name by Fenton Bailey and Randy Barbato of World of Wonder. The film tells the story of Tammy Faye Bakker (Jessica Chastain), from her humble beginnings growing up in International Falls, Minnesota, through the rise and fall of her televangelism career and marriage to Jim Bakker (Andrew Garfield). Cherry Jones and Vincent D'Onofrio also star. The film is produced by Chastain's production company, Freckle Films.

The Eyes of Tammy Faye had its world premiere at the Toronto International Film Festival in September 2021, and was released on September 17, 2021, by Searchlight Pictures. Critics praised the performances (particularly Chastain's) while criticizing the screenplay, deeming the film to be inferior to the documentary. At the 94th Academy Awards, the film won Best Actress (for Chastain) and Best Makeup and Hairstyling. Chastain also won the SAG Award and Critics' Choice Movie Award for Best Actress.

== Plot ==
As her mother is a divorcee, young Tammy Faye LaValley is deemed a reminder of her mother's sins and subsequently denied entrance to the rural, charismatic fundamentalist church where her mother plays piano, until Tammy sneaks in one day, receives communion wine and begins speaking in tongues at the altar and collapses. This is deemed a miracle by the pastor.

Years later, Tammy is chastised by her Bible college professors for wearing makeup. She is enamored with fellow student Jim Bakker's charismatic preaching while studying at North Central Bible College in Minneapolis, Minnesota. Jim had wanted to be a rock and roll DJ, until a tragic car accident one night almost killed his female passenger. The two marry despite disapproval from Tammy's mother Rachel, and against NCB college policy, then leave school and move in with Tammy's parents.

Their charismatic preaching, singing and children's puppet show, earns the attention of Pat Robertson's Christian Broadcasting Network, who hires them as hosts of children's show Jim and Tammy. Jim later becomes the first host of CBN's The 700 Club, as the two welcome daughter Tammy Sue.

Tammy and Jim meet conservative, Baptist patriarch, Rev. Jerry Falwell at Robertson's lush estate, with Jerry expressing interest in working with CBN to reach his Christian followers. Some years later, following an argument with Falwell in which Tammy dismisses the politicization of faith, she encourages Jim to create their own television network. The two leave CBN and establish the PTL Satellite Network, with their flagship show The PTL Club becoming immensely popular, reaching over 20 million people worldwide daily. Tammy invites Rachel and stepfather Fred to move in with them at their Tega Cay, South Carolina compound, but Rachel expresses her disapproval of how PTL monetizes the religious faith of its viewers.

As the press and Democrats become critical of the PTL Network's tax exempt status, Tammy develops an addiction to pills. While recording an album of Christian songs, a lonely Tammy becomes flirtatious with famed Nashville music producer Gary S. Paxton, whom Jim fires following the birth of their son Jay.

In the mid 1980s, Jim focuses his attention on building a Christian theme park, while Falwell's influence over PTL grows. When Falwell decries the "gay cancer", Tammy deliberately interviews AIDS patient and Christian pastor Steve Pieters on The PTL Club.

After collapsing during a PTL taping, Tammy must go to rehab. Tammy argues with Jim over their strained relationship and his subservience to Falwell. Falwell subsequently usurps control of PTL following news scandals about PTL's financial debt and Jim's extramarital affairs, including speculations about homosexual relationships. Jim is ultimately imprisoned for embezzling and financial fraud, and with no one left to protect her, Tammy is left jobless and forced to sell her home and possessions.

By 1994, Tammy and Jim have officially divorced, Rachel has died, and Tammy is struggling to revive her career and find television gigs. She gets an offer to be the special guest for a Christian concert at Oral Roberts University, which she hesitantly accepts. She preaches before performing a moving rendition of "Battle Hymn of the Republic", during which she imagines a rousing gospel choir performing with her.

A textual epilogue reveals Falwell died in 2007, Jim returned to televangelism for a revived PTL after being released from prison, and Tammy continued to support LGBTQ+ communities until she died on July 20, 2007, at her home in Loch Lloyd, near Kansas City, Missouri, after an eleven-year bout with cancer at the age of 65.

== Cast ==
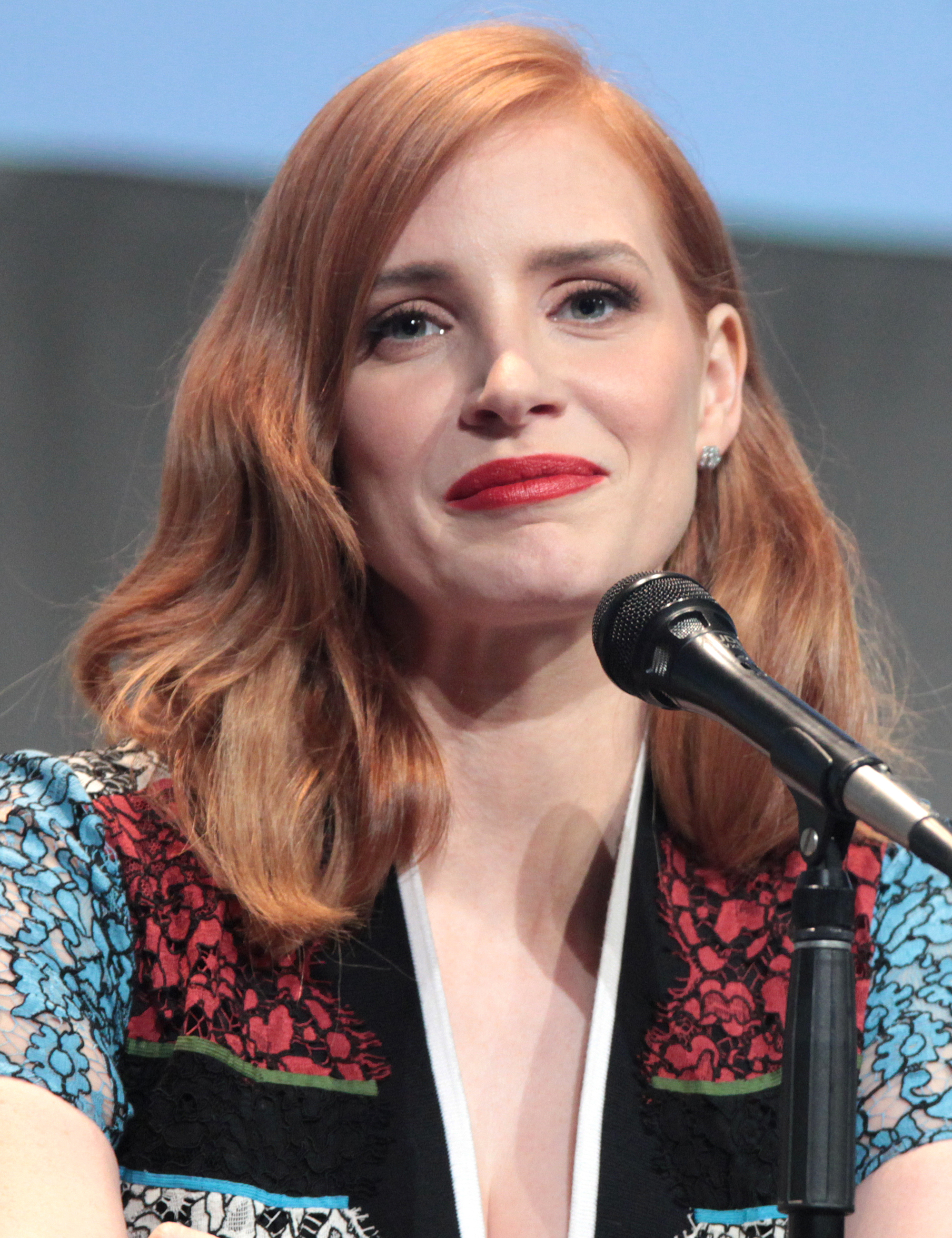
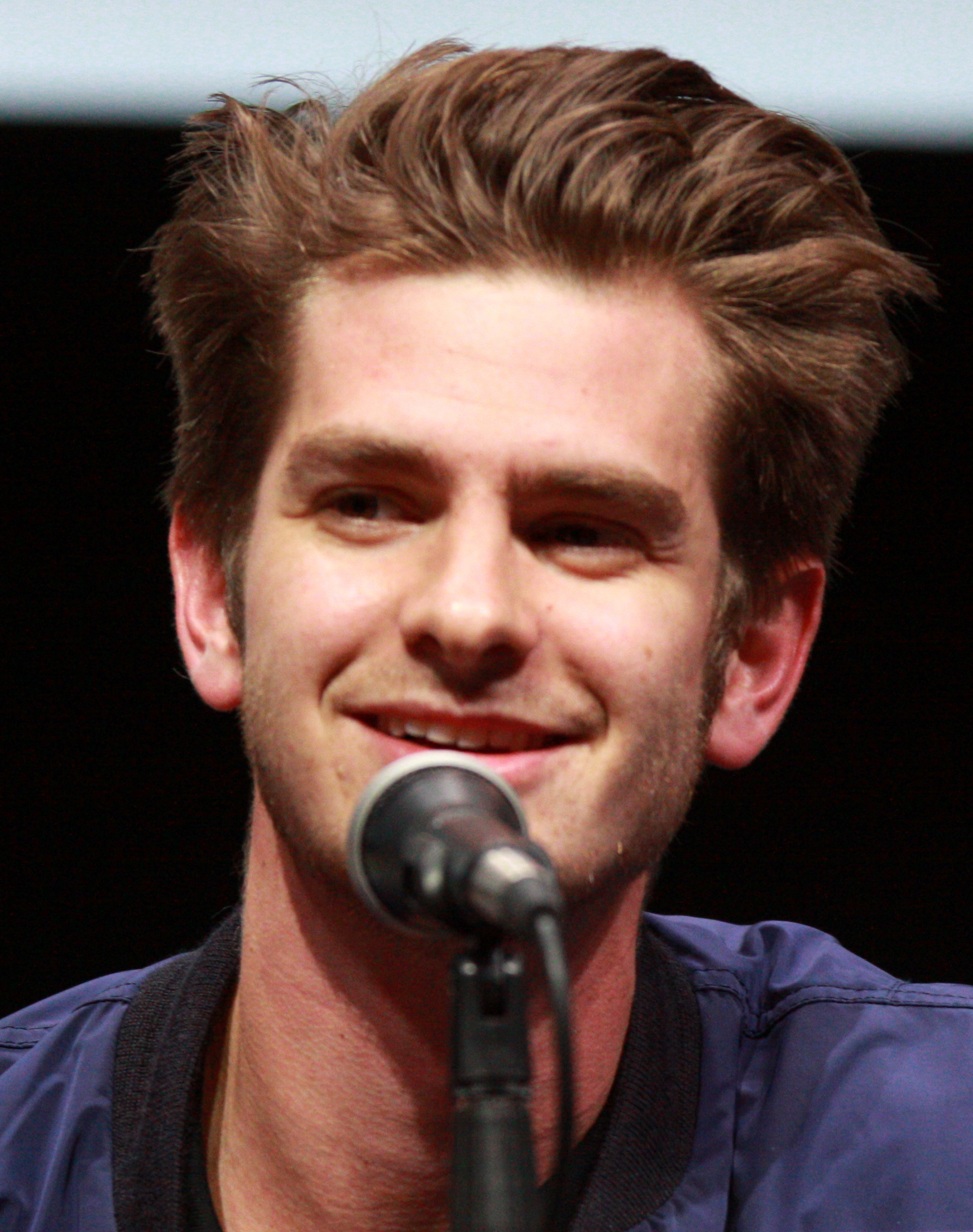
The film stars Jessica Chastain (left) and Andrew Garfield (right) as Tammy Faye Messner and Jim Bakker
- Jessica Chastain as Tammy Faye LaValley, later Bakker, and then Messner
  - Chandler Head as young Tammy Faye
- Andrew Garfield as Jim Bakker
- Cherry Jones as Rachel Grover, Tammy's mother
- Vincent D'Onofrio as Jerry Falwell
- Mark Wystrach as Gary S. Paxton
- Sam Jaeger as Roe Messner
- Louis Cancelmi as John Wesley Fletcher
- Gabriel Olds as Pat Robertson
- Fredric Lehne as Fred Grover, Tammy's stepfather
- Jay Huguley as Jimmy Swaggart
- Grant Owens as Colonel Sanders
- Coley Campany as Dede Robertson, Pat's wife
- Jess Weixler as makeup artist (voice)
- Randy Havens as Steve Pieters
- Lila Jane Meadows as Tammy Sue "Sissy" Bakker, Jim and Tammy's daughter
- Wes Jetton as Male Nurse

== Production ==
It was announced in May 2019 that Jessica Chastain and Andrew Garfield were cast to star in the film, with Michael Showalter directing. The film was produced through Jessica Chastain's production company, Freckle Films. Chastain detailed in an August 2019 interview she had acquired the rights to Tammy Faye Bakker's life in 2012. In October 2019, Cherry Jones joined the cast of the film. Chastain and Jones had both starred on Broadway in The Heiress, and Chastain was an admirer of Jones' work. In November 2019, Sam Jaeger, Vincent D'Onofrio, Gabriel Olds, Mark Wystrach, Chandler Head, Fredric Lehne and Jay Huguley joined the cast of the film.

Principal photography began in October 2019 in Charlotte, North Carolina.

Chastain stated in interviews that the makeup for the film took between 4–7 hours in the makeup chair having prosthetics added to her face. Chastain also wore false teeth in certain scenes to match the way Tammy Faye smiled. Chastain performs several songs from Bakker's musical catalog in the film. Tammy Sue Bakker-Chapman, the daughter of Jim and Tammy, performed on the film's soundtrack with a cover of "Don't Give Up (On the Brink of a Miracle)".

=== Music ===
The film's soundtrack was released on September 17, 2021, by Hollywood Records. The score for the film by Theodore Shapiro was also released as a separate album. Chastain worked with music producer Dave Cobb to record the soundtrack.

The Eyes of Tammy Faye (Original Motion Picture Soundtrack)

Soundtrack album by Jessica Chastain
- Released: September 17, 2021
- Genre: Soundtrack
- Length: 40:47
- Label: Hollywood
- Producers: Dave Cobb; Theodore Shapiro

Track listing
No.	Title	Writer(s)	Performer(s)	Length
1.	"Don't Give Up (On the Brink of a Miracle)"	Mike Adkins	Tammy Sue Bakker-Chapman	3:58
2.	"Battle Hymn of the Republic"	William Steffe, Julia Ward Howe	Jessica Chastain	3:43
3.	"Jesus Keeps Takin' Me Higher & Higher"	Gary S. Paxton	Jessica Chastain	3:25
4.	"The Sun Will Shine Again"	Mike Murdock	Jessica Chastain	5:20
5.	"Somebody Touched Me"	Savana C. Foust	Jessica Chastain ft. Mark Wystrach	4:31
6.	"We are Blest"	Margaret Pleasant Douroux	Jessica Chastain	6:21
7.	"Don't Give Up (On the Brink of a Miracle)"	Mike Adkins	Jessica Chastain	4:00
8.	"The Eyes of Tammy Faye Score Suite"	Theodore Shapiro	Theodore Shapiro	7:42
9.	"Puppet Medley (Give a Hug, Jesus Loves Me, Up with a Giggle)"	Heidi Webster, Anna Bartlett Warner, William Batchelder Bradbury, Danny O'Flaherty	Jessica Chastain	1:46
Total length:				40:47

== Release ==
The film had its world premiere at the 2021 Toronto International Film Festival on September 12, 2021, and was also an official selection at several other film festivals including 69th San Sebastián International Film Festival, Tokyo International Film Festival, Sedona Film Festival and the Sydney Film Festival. The film was released on September 17, 2021, after an initial release date of September 24. The film hosted a pink-carpet premiere in New York City on September 14, 2021, at the SVA Theatre.

The film was released on Blu-ray on November 16, 2021. The film was later made available to stream on HBO Max in February 2022 in the US.

== Reception ==
=== Box office ===
The Eyes of Tammy Faye debuted in 450 theaters and grossed $675,000 in its opening weekend (an average of $1,500 per venue). Deadline Hollywood wrote that outside of Los Angeles, New York City, and Austin, Texas the grosses "weren't good", and an indication that "older arthouse crowds are [not] back" to theaters due to the COVID-19 pandemic.

=== Critical response ===
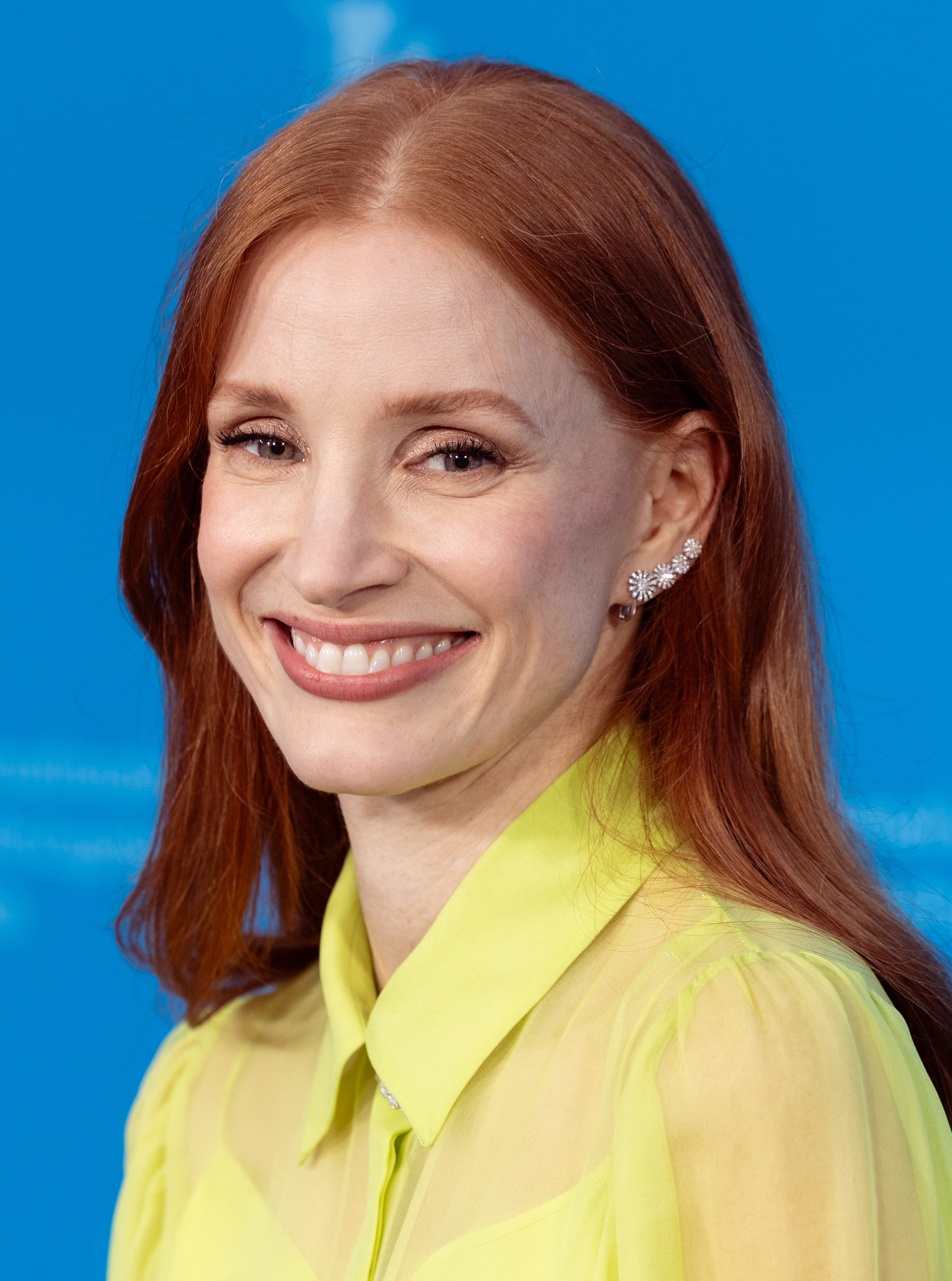
Jessica Chastain received critical acclaim for her performance and won the Academy Award for Best Actress.

On the review aggregator website Rotten Tomatoes, 67% of 254 critics' reviews are positive, with an average rating of 6.5/10. The website's critics consensus reads: "The Eyes of Tammy Faye might have focused more sharply on its subject's story, but Jessica Chastain's starring performance makes it hard to look away." Metacritic assigned the film an average weighted score of 55 out of 100, based on 48 critics, indicating "mixed or average" reviews. Audiences polled by CinemaScore gave the film an average grade of "B+" on an A+ to F scale.

Despite the mixed reviews for the film, Jessica Chastain ended up winning the Academy Award, along with a SAG and Critics Choice Awards for Best Actress.

=== Accolades ===
Award	Date of ceremony	Category	Recipient(s)	Result	Ref.
Academy Awards	March 27, 2022	Best Actress	Jessica Chastain	Won	
Academy Awards	March 27, 2022	Best Makeup and Hairstyling	Linda Dowds, Stephanie Ingram, and Justin Raleigh	Won	
Alliance of Women Film Journalists Awards	January 25, 2022	Best Actress	Jessica Chastain	Nominated	
British Academy Film Awards	March 13, 2022	Best Makeup and Hair	Linda Dowds, Stephanie Ingram, and Justin Raleigh	Won	
Chicago Film Critics Association Awards	December 15, 2021	Best Actress	Jessica Chastain	Nominated	
Critics' Choice Movie Awards	March 13, 2022	Best Actress	Jessica Chastain	Won	
Critics' Choice Movie Awards	March 13, 2022	Best Hair and Makeup	The Eyes of Tammy Faye	Won	
Dallas–Fort Worth Film Critics Association Awards	December 20, 2021	Best Actress	Jessica Chastain	3rd place	
Detroit Film Critics Society Awards	December 6, 2021	Best Actress	Jessica Chastain	Won	
Dorian Awards	March 17, 2022	Best Film Performance	Jessica Chastain	Nominated	
Florida Film Critics Circle Awards	December 22, 2021	Best Actress	Jessica Chastain	Nominated	
Golden Globe Awards	January 9, 2022	Best Actress in a Motion Picture – Drama	Jessica Chastain	Nominated	
Golden Trailer Awards	October 6, 2022	Best Faith Based Trailer	The Eyes of Tammy Faye	Nominated	
Guild of Music Supervisors Awards	March 20, 2022	Best Music Supervision for Films Budgeted Under $25 Million	John Houlihan	Nominated	
Hollywood Critics Association Awards	February 28, 2022	Best Actress	Jessica Chastain	Nominated	
Hollywood Critics Association Awards	February 28, 2022	Best Hair and Makeup	Linda Dowds, Stephanie Ingram, and Justin Raleigh	Won	
Houston Film Critics Society Awards	January 19, 2022	Best Actress	Jessica Chastain	Won	
Houston Film Critics Society Awards	January 19, 2022	Best Supporting Actor	Andrew Garfield	Nominated	
London Film Critics' Circle Awards	February 6, 2022	British/Irish Actor of the Year	Andrew Garfield	Won	
Make-Up Artists and Hair Stylists Guild Awards	February 19, 2022	Best Period and/or Character Make-Up in a Feature-Length Motion Picture	Linda Dowds, Ashleigh Chavis-Wolfe, and Renee Goodwin	Nominated	
Make-Up Artists and Hair Stylists Guild Awards	February 19, 2022	Best Period and/or Character Hair Styling in a Feature-Length Motion Picture	Stephanie Ingram, Betty Lou Skinner, Heather Hawkins, and Bryson Conley	Nominated	
Make-Up Artists and Hair Stylists Guild Awards	February 19, 2022	Best Special Make-Up Effects in a Feature-Length Motion Picture	Justin Raleigh, Kelly Golden, Chris Hampton, and Thomas Floutz	Nominated	
Palm Springs International Film Festival	January 6, 2022	Desert Palm Achievement Award – Actress	Jessica Chastain	Won	
San Francisco Bay Area Film Critics Circle Awards	January 10, 2022	Best Actress	Jessica Chastain	Nominated	
San Sebastián International Film Festival	September 25, 2021	Golden Shell	The Eyes of Tammy Faye	Nominated	
San Sebastián International Film Festival	September 25, 2021	Silver Shell for Best Leading Performance	Jessica Chastain	Won	
Satellite Awards	April 2, 2022	Best Actress in a Motion Picture	Jessica Chastain	Nominated	
Screen Actors Guild Awards	February 27, 2022	Outstanding Performance by a Female Actor in a Leading Role	Jessica Chastain	Won	
St. Louis Film Critics Association Awards	December 19, 2021	Best Actress	Jessica Chastain	Nominated	
Vancouver Film Critics Circle Awards	March 7, 2022	Best Actress	Jessica Chastain	Nominated	
Women's Image Network Awards	October 14, 2021	Outstanding Feature Film	The Eyes of Tammy Faye	Nominated	
Women's Image Network Awards	October 14, 2021	Outstanding Film Produced by a Woman	Jessica Chastain, Kelly Carmichael, Rachel Shane, and Gigi Pritzker	Nominated	
Women's Image Network Awards	October 14, 2021	Outstanding Actress Feature Film	Jessica Chastain	Won	

== See also ==
- The Eyes of Tammy Faye – A documentary released in 2000 featuring Bakker.
- Tammy Faye: Death Defying – A follow-up documentary released in 2005 detailing her battles with cancer.
- Fall From Grace – A television film released in 1990, starring Bernadette Peters as Bakker.
