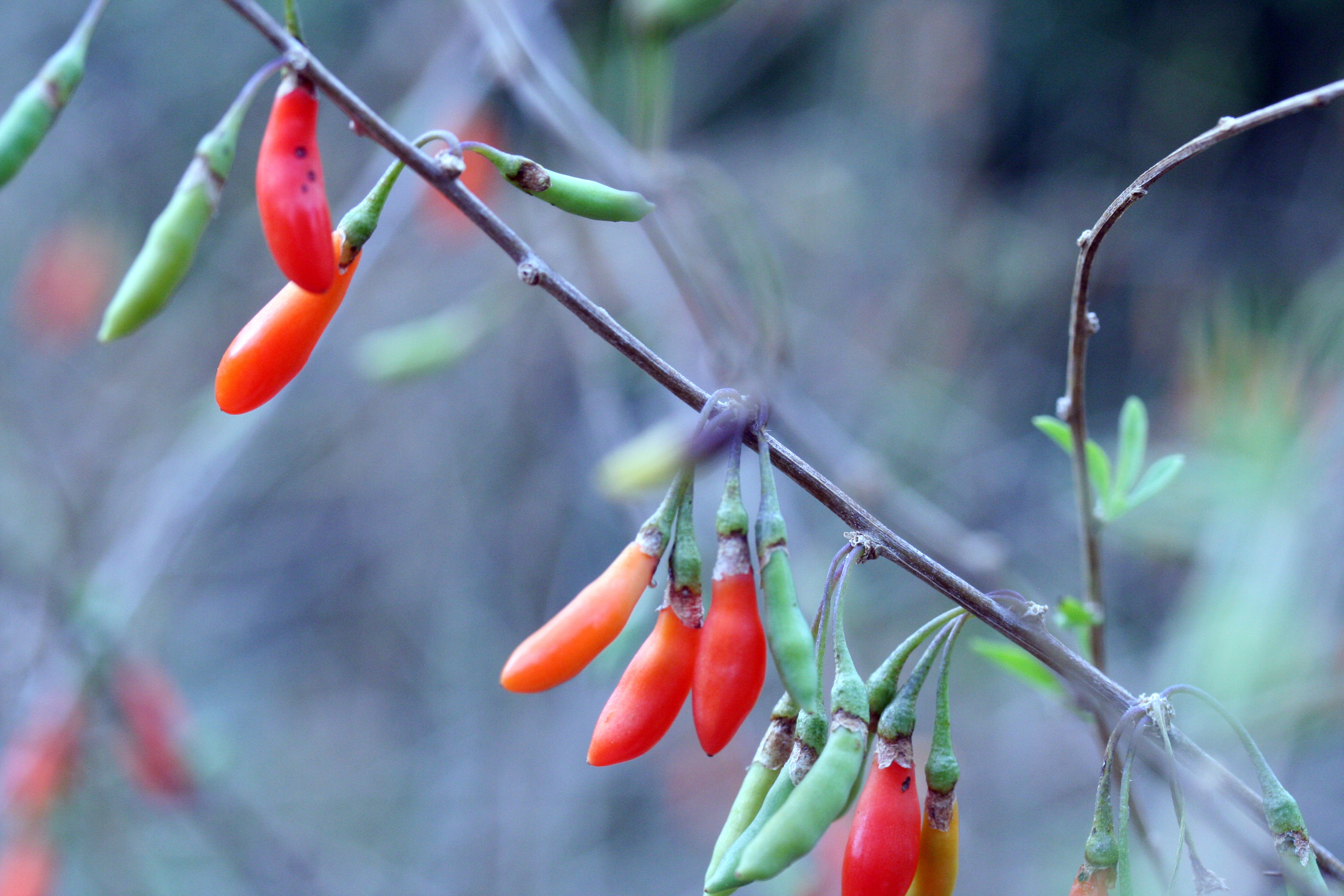
- Lycium chinense fruits

Scientific classification
- Kingdom: Plantae
- Clade: Tracheophytes
- Clade: Angiosperms
- Clade: Eudicots
- Clade: Asterids
- Order: Solanales
- Family: Solanaceae
- Genus: Lycium
- Species: L. chinense

Binomial name
- Lycium chinense Mill.

Synonyms
- Lycium barbarum var. chinense (Mill.) Aiton; Lycium megistocarpum var. ovatum (Poir.) Dunal; Lycium ovatum Poir.; Lycium potaninii Pojark.; Lycium rhombifolium Dippel; Lycium sinense Gren.; Lycium trewianum Roem. & Schult.

= Lycium chinense =

Species of flowering plant

Lycium chinense is one of two species of boxthorn shrub in the family Solanaceae. Along with Lycium barbarum, it produces the goji berry ("wolfberry"). Two varieties are recognized, L. chinense var. chinense and L. chinense var. potaninii. It is also known as Chinese boxthorn, Chinese matrimony-vine, Chinese teaplant, Chinese wolfberry, wolfberry, and Chinese desert-thorn.

== Description ==
Wolfberry species are deciduous woody shrubs, growing 1–3 metres (3 ft 3 in – 9 ft 10 in) high, somewhat shorter than L. barbarum. The stems are highly branched. Branches are pale gray, slender, curved or pendulous, with thorns 0.5–2 centimetres (0.20–0.79 in) long.

=== Leaves ===
Lycium chinense leaves form on the shoot either solitary in an alternating arrangement or in bundles of 2 to 4. Their shape may be ovate, rombic, lanceolate, or linear-lanceolate, usually 1.5–5 centimetres (0.59–1.97 in) long and 0.5–2.5 centimetres (0.20–0.98 in) wide (but up to 10 centimetres (3.9 in) long and 4 centimetres (1.6 in) wide in cultivated plants).

=== Flowers ===
The flowers grow in groups of one to three in the leaf axils, with pedicels 1–2 centimetres (0.39–0.79 in) long. The bell-shaped or tubular calyx (eventually ruptured by the growing berry) splits halfway into short, triangular, densely ciliate lobes. The corollae is a tube that splits into lavender or light purple petals, 9–14 mm (0.35–0.55 in) wide with five or six lobes longer than the tube, with short hairs at the edge. The stamens are structured with filaments longer than the anthers, slightly shorter or longer than the corolla, with a villous ring slightly above the base and the adjacent corolla tube. The anthers are longitudinally dehiscent.

=== Fruit and seeds ===
Lycium chinense produces a bright orange-red berry, whose shape is ovoid or oblong, 7–15 millimetres (0.28–0.59 in) long and 5 to 8 mm wide (but up to 22 millimetres (0.87 in) long and 10 millimetres (0.39 in) wide in cultivation). It contains compressed yellow seeds, from 2.5 to 3 mm wide, with a curved embryo; their number varies widely based on cultivar and fruit size, from 10 to 60. The berries ripen from July to October in the Northern Hemisphere.

=== Disease ===
It can be parasitized by the oomycete species Peronospora lycii.

=== Similar species ===
Lycium chinense can be distinguished from the very similar Lycium barbarum by morphological traits of the flowers. The corolla tubes of barbarum are significantly longer than the lobes, and the calyx of chinense usually has more than two lobes whereas barbarum has just two.

== Use ==
The fruits may be infused with hot water to make goji tea. The plant has been used for centuries in traditional Chinese medicine for treating various disorders, although there is no high-quality clinical evidence that consuming it has any effect on health or disease.

== Chemistry ==
The fruit composition is similar to that of L. barbarum, with polysaccharides, carotenoids and flavonoids as main constituents. Rutin is a prominent flavonoid, while the main carotenoid is zeaxanthin dipalmitate (49% of the carotenoid fraction), with β-carotene, two cerebrosides, and three pyrrole derivatives as other constituents.

Dozens of secondary metabolites have been isolated and identified from the roots, root bark, and leaves, including cyclic peptides, alkaloids, and flavonoids. Citric acid is the major nonvolatile organic acid in the leaves followed by oxalic acid.

== Gallery ==
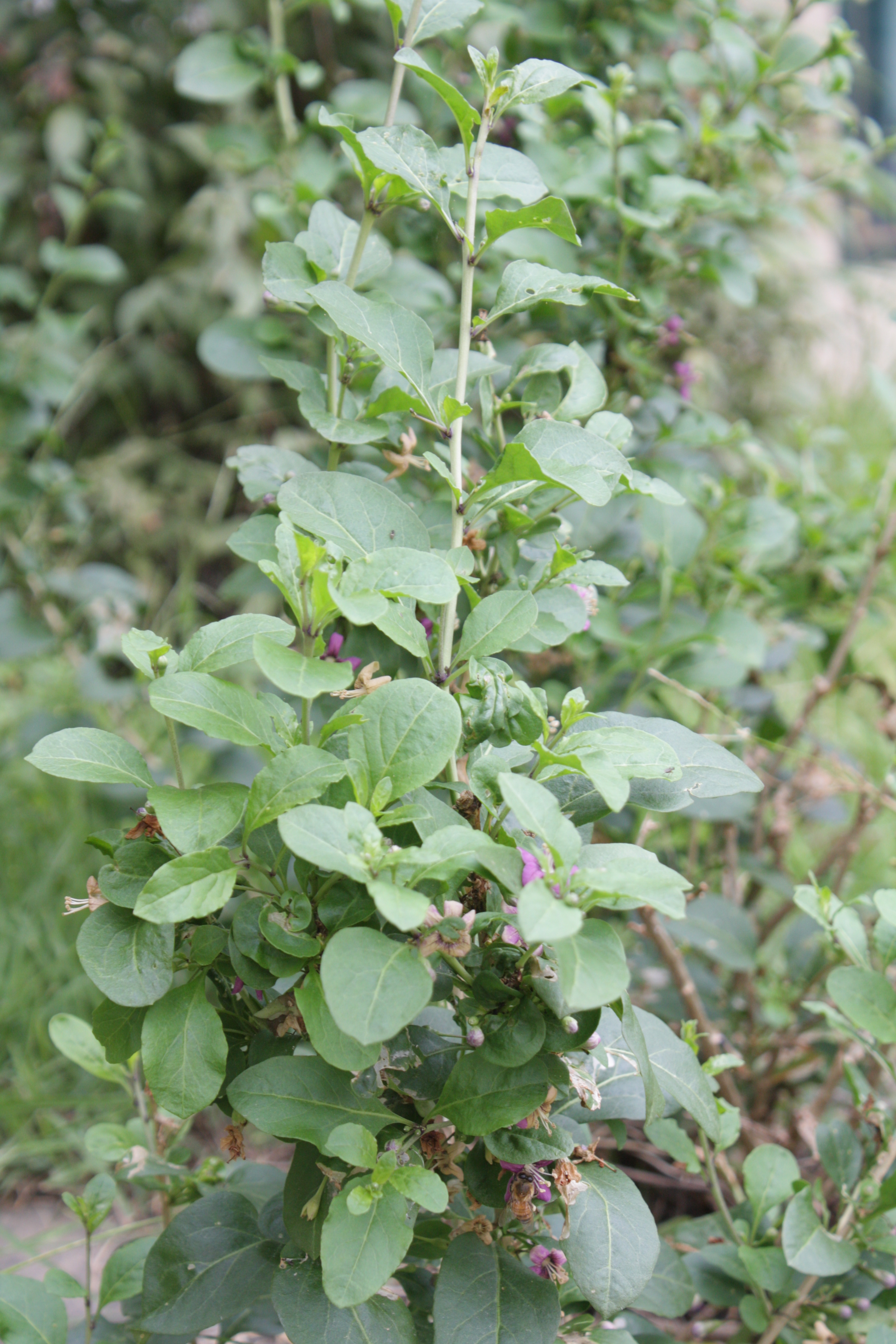
Habitus

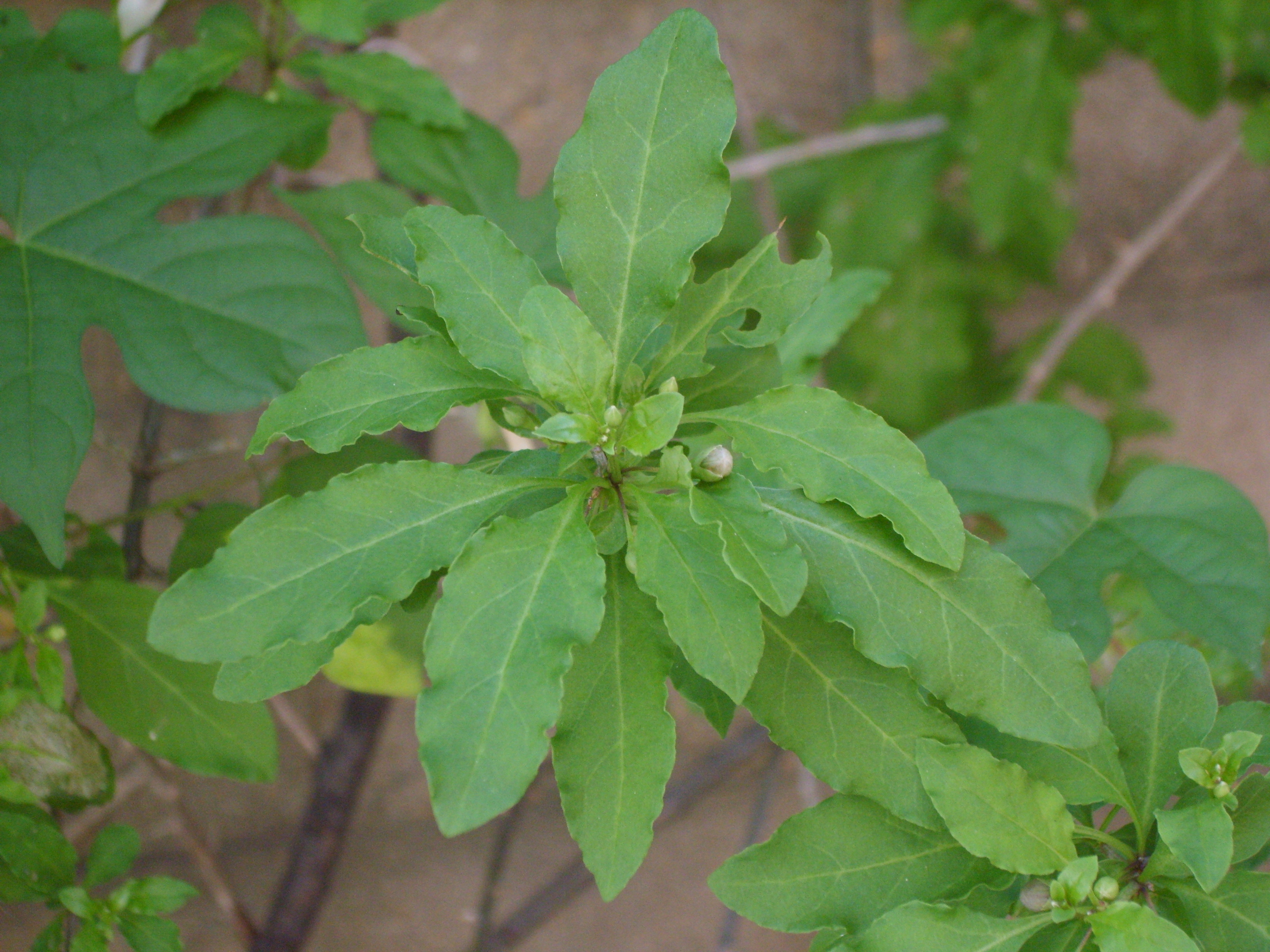
Leaves and buds

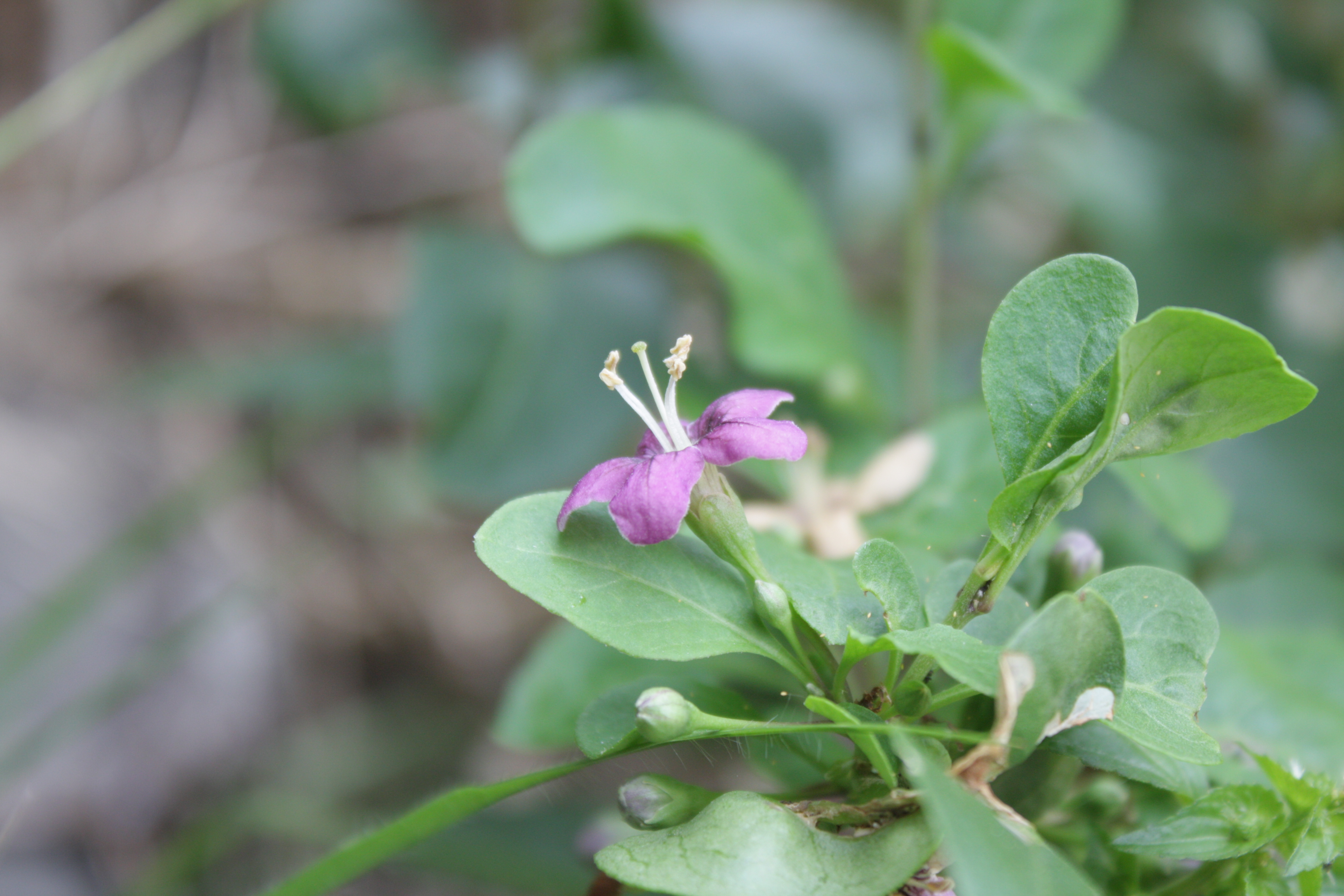
Leaves and flower

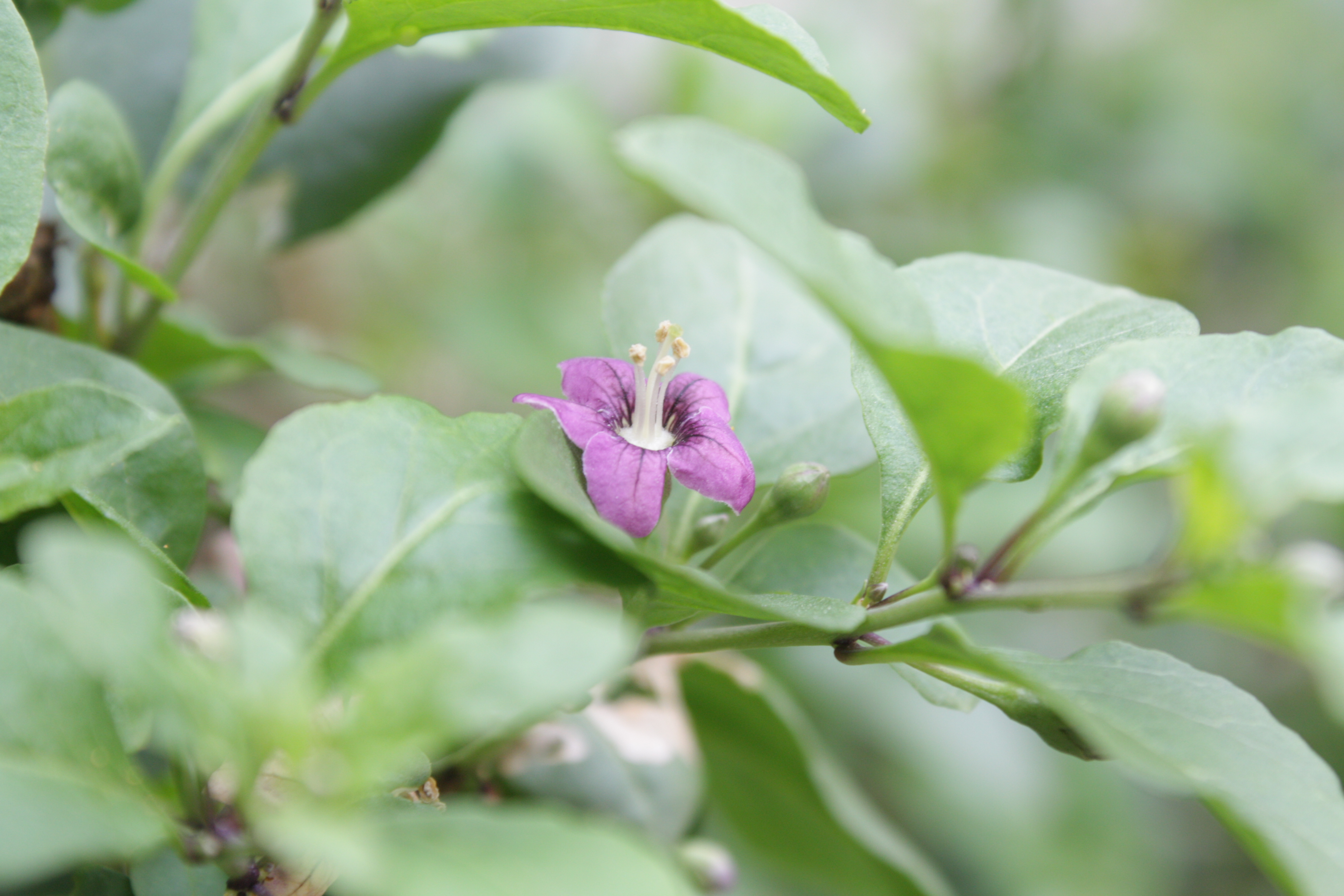
Leaves and flower

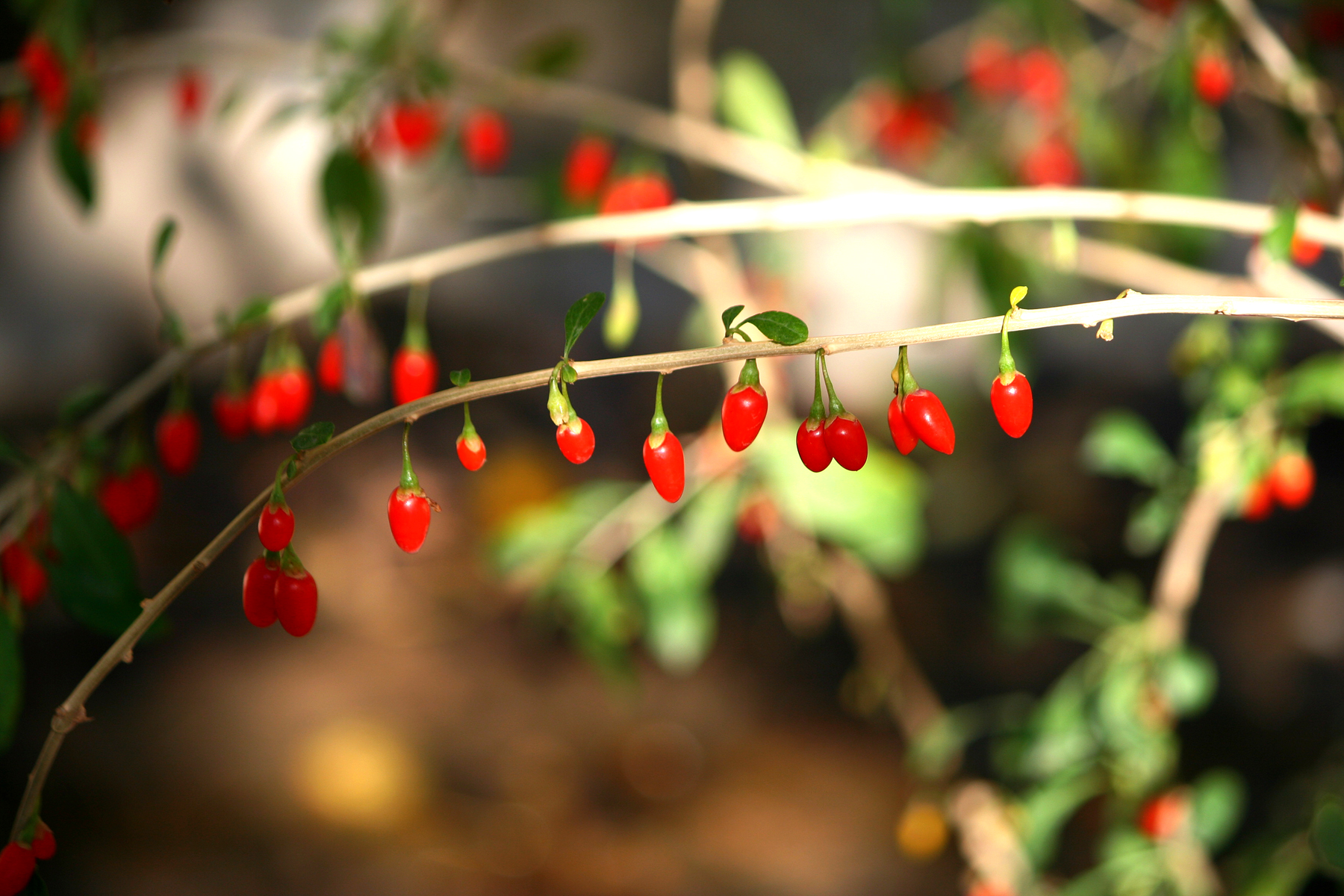
Berries

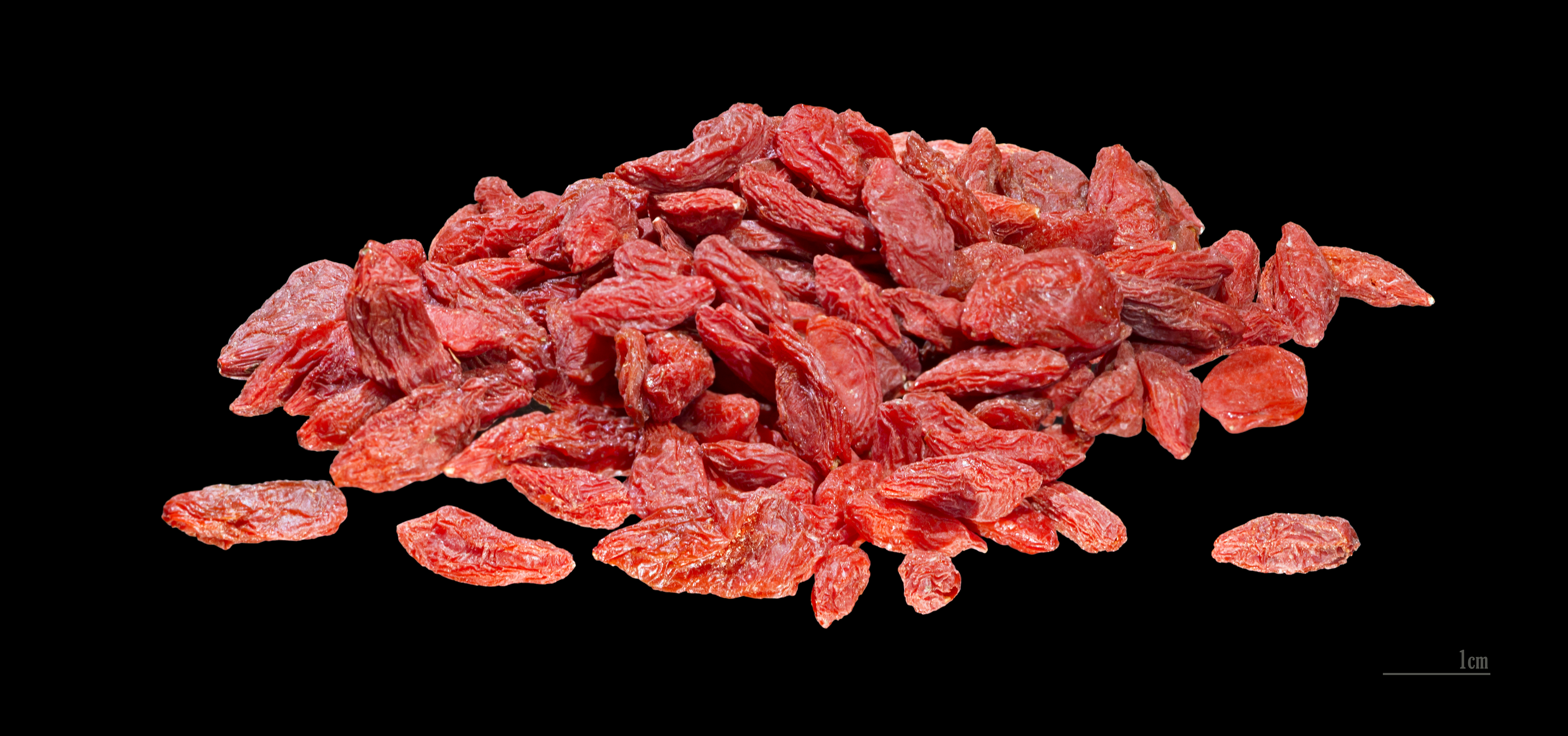
Dried berries

== See also ==
- List of culinary fruits
- List of dried foods
