= Revolution 9 =

1968 sound collage by the Beatles

Composition by the Beatles

from the album The Beatles
- Released: 22 November 1968
- Recorded: June 1968
- Studio: EMI, London
- Genre: Sound collage; avant-garde; musique concrète; noise; surrealist; experimental; psychedelia
- Length: 8:22
- Label: Apple
- Songwriter: Lennon–McCartney
- Producer: George Martin

"Revolution 9" is a sound collage by English rock band the Beatles from their 1968 album The Beatles (also known as the "White Album"). The composition, credited to Lennon–McCartney, was created primarily by John Lennon with assistance from Yoko Ono and George Harrison. An attempt to paint a picture of a revolution using sound, the composition was influenced by the avant-garde style of Ono as well as the musique concrète works of composers such as Edgard Varèse and Karlheinz Stockhausen.

The recording began as an extended ending to the album version of Lennon's song "Revolution". Lennon, Harrison and Ono then combined the unused coda with numerous overdubbed vocals, speech, sound effects, and short tape loops of speech and musical performances, some of which were reversed. These were further manipulated with echo, distortion, stereo panning, and fading. At eight minutes and twenty-two seconds, it is the longest track that the Beatles officially released while together as a band.

== Background and inspiration ==
"Revolution 9" was not the first venture by the Beatles into experimental recordings. The group had introduced avant-garde styling in their 1966 song "Tomorrow Never Knows" and, in January 1967, they recorded an unreleased piece called "Carnival of Light". McCartney said the work was inspired by composers Karlheinz Stockhausen and John Cage. Stockhausen was also a favourite of Lennon, and was one of the people included on the Sgt. Pepper album cover. Music critic Ian MacDonald wrote that "Revolution 9" may have been influenced by Stockhausen's Hymnen in particular.

Another influence on Lennon was his relationship with Yoko Ono. Lennon and Ono had recently recorded their own avant-garde album, Unfinished Music No. 1: Two Virgins. Lennon said: "Once I heard her stuff – not just the screeching and howling but her sort of word pieces and talking and breathing and all this strange stuff ... I got intrigued, so I wanted to do one." Ono attended the recording sessions and, according to Lennon, helped him select which tape loops to use.

In a 1992 interview for Musician magazine, George Harrison said that it was he and Ringo Starr who selected the sounds, sourced from EMI's tape library, including the "Number nine, number nine" dialogue. Authors Chip Madinger and Mark Easter write that the content of Harrison's lesser-known experimental piece "Dream Scene", recorded between November 1967 and February 1968 for his Wonderwall Music album, suggests that Harrison had a greater influence on "Revolution 9" than has been acknowledged. In his book about the Beatles' White Album, titled Revolution, David Quantick lists Lennon, Ono and Harrison as the "actual writers", despite the Lennon–McCartney composer's credit. In the 2011 documentary George Harrison: Living in the Material World, Ono says that "George, John and I made ['Revolution 9']" and that Harrison "sort of instigated it" and pushed them to create the piece.

== Recording ==
"Revolution 9" originated on 30 May 1968 during the first recording session for Lennon's composition "Revolution". Take 20 of that song lasted more than ten minutes and was given additional overdubs over the next two sessions. Mark Lewisohn describes the last six minutes as "pure chaos ... with discordant instrumental jamming, feedback, John repeatedly screaming 'RIGHT' and then, simply, repeatedly screaming ... with Yoko talking and saying such off-the-wall phrases as 'you become naked', and with the overlaying of miscellaneous, home-made sound effects tapes."

Lennon soon decided to make the first part of the recording into a conventional Beatles song, "Revolution 1", and to use the last six minutes as the basis for a separate track, "Revolution 9". He began preparing additional sound effects and tape loops: some newly recorded in the studio, at home and from the studio archives. The work culminated on 20 June, with Lennon performing a live mix from tape loops running on machines in all three studios at EMI Studios. During the live mix, the STEED system ran out and the sound of the tape machine rewinding can be heard at the 5:11 mark. Additional prose was overdubbed by Lennon and Harrison.

More overdubs were added on 21 June followed by final mixing in stereo. The stereo master was completed on 25 June when it was shortened by 53 seconds. Although other songs on the album were separately remixed for the mono version, the complexity of "Revolution 9" necessitated making the mono mix a direct reduction of the final stereo master. McCartney had been out of the country when "Revolution 9" was assembled and mixed; he was unimpressed when he first heard the finished track, and later tried to persuade Lennon to drop his insistence that it be included on the album. Lennon said that the final editing was done by himself and Ono alone.

== Structure and content ==
"Revolution 9" is a sound collage, which has been described as piece of experimental, avant-garde, musique concrète, surrealist, noise music, and psychedelic music. The piece begins with a slow piano theme in the key of B minor and the voice of an EMI engineer repeating the words "number nine", quickly panning across the stereo channels. Both the piano theme and the "number nine" loop recur many times during the piece, serving as a motif. Lennon later said of the track and its production:

Revolution 9 was an unconscious picture of what I actually think will happen when it happens; just like a drawing of a revolution. All the thing was made with loops. I had about 30 loops going, fed them onto one basic track. I was getting classical tapes, going upstairs and chopping them up, making it backwards and things like that, to get the sound effects. One thing was an engineer's testing voice saying, "This is EMI test series number nine." I just cut up whatever he said and I'd number nine it. Nine turned out to be my birthday and my lucky number and everything. I didn't realise it: it was just so funny the voice saying, "number nine"; it was like a joke, bringing number nine into it all the time, that's all it was.

Much of the track consists of tape loops that are faded in and out, several of which are sampled from performances of classical music. Works that have been specifically identified include the Vaughan Williams motet O Clap Your Hands, the final chord from Sibelius's Symphony No. 7, and the reversed finale of Schumann's Symphonic Studies. Other loops include violins from "A Day in the Life" and sped up loops from "Tomorrow Never Knows". Part of the Arabic song "Awal Hamsa" by Farid al-Atrash is included shortly after the 7-minute mark. There are also loops of unidentified operatic performances, backwards mellotron, violins and sound effects, a reversed, noisy, and often very warped oboe/cello duet with orchestral clatter as background noise, a reversed electric guitar in the key of E major, loud cymbals, and a reversed string quartet in the key of E-flat major.

One notable loop, rumored to be from the unreleased track Carnival of Light, starts appearing at about the 2-and-a-half-minute mark and is heavily concentrated with a cacophony of noises, providing a chaotic texture to the track. The loop's background noise is hard to describe and features what sounds like loud industrial noise, chair creaking, and a discordant double bass. The loop begins with a barely discernible and heavily reverberated George Martin shouting "Geoff, could you put the red light on?", followed by distorted amplifier feedback, then a short "Swami" solo clarinet rendition of The Streets of Cairo, ending with Martin shushing loudly before the loop repeats.

Portions of the unused coda of "Revolution 1 (Take 18)" can be heard briefly several times during the track, particularly Lennon's screams of "right" and "all right", with a longer portion near the end featuring Ono's discourse about becoming naked. Segments of random prose read by Lennon and Harrison are heard prominently throughout, along with numerous sound effects such as women's laughter, a cooing baby, crowd noise, playing schoolchildren, breaking glass, car horns, crackling fire and gunfire. Some of the sounds were taken from the Elektra Records "Authentic Sound Effects" series of stock sound effects. The piece ends with a recording of American football chants ("Hold that line! Block that kick!"). In all, the final mix includes at least 45 different sound sources.

== Album sequencing and release ==
During compilation and sequencing of the master tape for the album The Beatles, two unrelated segments were included between the previous song ("Cry Baby Cry") and "Revolution 9". The first was a fragment of a song based on the line "Can you take me back", an improvisation sung by McCartney that was recorded between takes of "I Will". The second was a bit of conversation from the studio control room where Alistair Taylor asked Martin for forgiveness for not bringing him a bottle of claret, and then calling him a "cheeky bitch".

"Revolution 9" was released as the penultimate track on side four of the double LP. With no gaps in the sequence from "Cry Baby Cry" to "Revolution 9", the point of track division has varied among different reissues of the album. Some versions place the conversation at the end of "Cry Baby Cry", resulting in a length of 8:13 for "Revolution 9", while others start "Revolution 9" with the conversation, for a track length of 8:22. Later CD and digital releases have the conversation at the beginning of "Revolution 9".

== Reception ==
... compare Lennon's work with Luigi Nono's similar Non Consumiamo Marx (1969) to see how much more aesthetically and politically acute Lennon was than most of the vaunted avant-garde composers of the time ... Nono's piece entirely lacks the pop-bred sense of texture and proportion manifested in "Revolution 9".

— Ian MacDonald

"Revolution 9" is an embarrassment that stands like a black hole at the end of the White Album, sucking up whatever energy and interest remain after the preceding ninety minutes of music. It is a track that neither invites nor rewards close attention ...

— Jonathan Gould

The unusual nature of "Revolution 9" engendered a wide range of opinions. Lewisohn summarised the public reaction upon its release as "most listeners loathing it outright, the dedicated fans trying to understand it". Music critics Robert Christgau and John Piccarella called it "an anti-masterpiece" and commented that, in effect, "for eight minutes of an album officially titled The Beatles, there were no Beatles." In their respective reviews of the White Album, Alan Walsh of Melody Maker called the track "noisy, boring and meaningless", while the NME's Alan Smith derided it as "a pretentious piece of old codswallop ... a piece of idiot immaturity and a blotch on their own unquestioned talent as well as the album". Jann Wenner was more complimentary, writing in Rolling Stone that "Revolution 9" was "beautifully organized" and had more political impact than "Revolution 1". Ian MacDonald remarked that "Revolution 9" evoked the era's revolutionary disruptions and their repercussions, and thus was culturally "one of the most significant acts the Beatles ever perpetrated", as well as "the world's most widely distributed avant-garde artifact".

Among more recent reviews, Rob Sheffield wrote in The New Rolling Stone Album Guide that it was "justly maligned", but "more fun than 'Honey Pie' or 'Yer Blues'". Mark Richardson of Pitchfork commented that "the biggest pop band in the world exposed millions of fans to a really great and certainly frightening piece of avant-garde art." David Quantick, writing in 2002, similarly described it as being "after nearly a quarter of a century, [still] the most radical and innovative track ever to bring a rock record to its climax". He added that the Beatles' popularity ensured that an avant-garde recording was found in millions of homes around the world: "No one in the history of recorded music has ever been so successful in introducing such extreme music to so many people, most of whom, admittedly, will try their best never to hear 'Revolution 9.' Those who do listen to it usually find that it not only rewards repeated playing ... but that it also knocks other tracks on the White Album into a cocked hat."

Edward Sharp-Paul of FasterLouder wrote that "'Revolution 9' is the sound of an illusion shattering: Yes, the Beatles are human, and sometimes they drop almighty turds." The track was voted the worst Beatles song in one of the first such polls, conducted in 1971 by WPLJ and The Village Voice. Writing for Mojo in 2003, Mark Paytress said that "Revolution 9" remained "the most unpopular piece of music the Beatles ever made", yet it was also their "most extraordinary [recording]".

== Interpretation ==
"Revolution 9" (section)
The claimed backmasked section of Revolution 9.

"Revolution 9" (section) (reversed)
The same section, reversed, which was claimed to sound like "turn me on, dead man".

Lennon said he was "painting in sound a picture of revolution", but he had mistakenly made it "anti-revolution". In his analysis of the song, MacDonald doubted that Lennon conceptualised the piece as representing a revolution in the usual sense, but rather as "a sensory attack on the citadel of the intellect: a revolution in the head" aimed at each listener. MacDonald also noted that the structure suggests a "half-awake, channel-hopping" mental state, with underlying themes of consciousness and quality of awareness. Others have described the piece as Lennon's attempt at turning "nightmare imagery" into sound, and as "an autobiographical soundscape". The loop of "number nine" featured in the recording fuelled the legend of Paul McCartney's death after it was reported that it sounded like "turn me on, dead man" when played backwards.

In an interview held at his home on 2 December 1968, Lennon was asked if "Revolution 9" was about death, because it seemed like that to the interviewer. Lennon answered: "Well then it is, then, when you heard it ... listen to it another day. In the sun. Outside. And see if it's about death then." He went on: "It's not specifically about anything. It's a set of sounds, like walking down the street is a set of sounds. And I just captured a moment of time, and put it on disc, and it's about that ... It was maybe to do with the sounds of a revolution ... so that's the vague story behind it. But apart from that, it's just a set of sounds."

Based on interviews and testimony, prosecutor Vincent Bugliosi asserted that Charles Manson believed that many songs on the album The Beatles contained references confirming his prediction of an impending apocalyptic race war, a scenario dubbed "Helter Skelter". According to Gregg Jakobson, Manson mentioned "Revolution 9" more often than any of the other album tracks, and he interpreted it as a parallel of Chapter 9 of the Book of Revelation. Manson viewed the piece as a portrayal in sound of the coming black-white revolution. He misheard Lennon's distorted screams of "Right!" within "Revolution 9" as a command to "Rise!" Speaking to music journalist David Dalton before his trial, Manson drew parallels between the animal noises that close Harrison's White Album track "Piggies" and a similar sound, followed by machine-gun fire, that appears in "Revolution 9".

== Personnel ==
- John Lennon – spoken vocals, tape loops, sound effects, piano, Mellotron, cymbals, screaming, mumbling
- George Harrison – spoken vocals, tape loops, sound effects, electric guitar
- Yoko Ono – spoken vocals, tape loops, sound effects
- George Martin – spoken vocals
- Alistair Taylor – spoken vocals

Additionally, Paul McCartney and Ringo Starr performed on the extended "Revolution" coda, elements of which were used intermittently in "Revolution 9".

== Cover versions ==
Kurt Hoffman's Band of Weeds performs "Revolution #9" on the 1992 album Live at the Knitting Factory: Downtown Does the Beatles (Knitting Factory Records). The jam band Phish performed "Revolution 9" (along with almost all of the songs from The Beatles) at their Halloween 1994 concert that was released in 2002 as Live Phish Volume 13. (Band member Jon Fishman streaked across the stage after the line "if you become naked".) Australian dance rock band Def FX recorded a version for their 1996 album Majick. Little Fyodor recorded a cover in 1987 and released it as a CD single in 2000. The Shazam recorded a cover version of "Revolution #9" which appears as the final track on their mini-album Rev9, released in 2000. Brazilian musician Rogério Skylab recorded a cover of the song in 2008 for a collaborative tribute album commemorating the 40th anniversary of the release of the White Album.

In 2008, the contemporary classical chamber ensemble Alarm Will Sound transcribed an orchestral re-creation of "Revolution 9" which they performed on tour and recorded on their 2016 album Alarm Will Sound Presents Modernists. Also in 2008, the contemporary jazz trio The Neil Cowley Trio recorded both "Revolution 9" and "Revolution" for the magazine Mojo. "Revolution 9" has also inspired songs by punk group United Nations ("Resolution 9") and rock band Marilyn Manson ("Revelation #9"). It also inspired White Zombie's "Real Solution #9", which contains samples of a Prime Time Live interview that Diane Sawyer conducted with Manson Family member Patricia Krenwinkel. In the sample used Krenwinkel is heard saying: "Yeah, I remember her saying, 'I'm already dead'." Skinny Puppy references a reversed melodic fragment from "Revolution #9" on their song "Love in Vein" from their album Last Rights. Mexican rock band Botellita de Jerez did a redemption to this theme with the track "Devolución, no hay", included in their second album called La venganza del hijo del guacarrock. Instead of the voice saying "Number nine", they recorded a voice saying "No'mbre, no hay" (translated as "No, man, there isn't").
