= Margaret Pleasant Douroux =

- Born: March 21, 1941 (age 85); Los Angeles, California

Margaret Pleasant Douroux (March 21, 1941, Los Angeles, California) is an American gospel songwriter, teacher, and author. She works in Bible-based ministries and song composition. Some of her most popular songs include "We’re Blessed", "Give Me A Clean Heart", "If It Had Not Been For The Lord On My Side", "He Decided To Die", and 'What Shall I Render".

== Early life and education ==
Margaret Pleasant Douroux was born on March 21, 1941, in Los Angeles, California, to Olga and Earl A. Pleasant and was one of six children. Earl was a gospel singer who toured with Mahalia Jackson. Though many of her more distant ancestors were Catholic, Douroux's grandfather converted to the Baptist denomination with his wife, as did Douroux's husband.

At an early age, she began singing in the children’s choir at Mt. Moriah Baptist church where her father served as pastor. She went on to become the accompanist for the Sunday School Baptist Training Union and the Young People’s Choir. For 12 years she was director and accompanist for the Young Adult Choir and Orchestra at Mount Moriah Baptist Church, Los Angeles. During these years, Douroux was heavily influenced by Gospel music. Her mentor, Thurston Frazier, was the minister of music at Mt. Moriah and was a contemporary of Rev. James Cleveland. Frazier and Cleveland would go on to work together and this relationship would serve as a grounding for Douroux's early introduction into the Gospel Music Workshop of America in the 70's.

Douroux began her schooling in the Los Angeles public school system. She attended Southern University in Baton Rouge, Louisiana, in the 1960s, and then earned a BA in music from California State University, Los Angeles in 1964. She received both her MS and MA in Education and Educational Psychology from the University of Southern California in 1968 and 1978 respectively. Douroux would go on to earn a Ph.D. in education from the University of Beverly Hills.

== Career ==
Douroux worked as an elementary school teacher for 13 years including two years as a second-grade teacher, a counselor, and as an educational psychologist for twelve years. Douroux also worked with her surrounding community in music and schooling.

During the course of her music career, Douroux wrote has written close to 200 gospel songs, some of which have been recorded by artists like Nikki Giovanni, the Kelly Price, Mighty Clouds of Joy, and James Cleveland's Gospel Music Workshop of America's Mass Choir. She has also held gospel music workshops throughout the United States and Europe. An ecumenically popular figure, she founded the gospel choir at St. Brigid Catholic Church in Los Angeles when the congregation requested her services.

Some of her featured works include: 'We’re Blessed,' 'Rivers of Joy,' 'Give Me A Clean Heart,' 'If It Had Not Been For The Lord On My Side,' 'Trees,' 'I’m Glad,' 'He Decided To Die,' and 'What Shall I Render'.

== Community involvement ==
For five years, Douroux was the minister of music and the adult choir director for the Mount Moriah Baptist Church of Los Angeles, as well as the Minister of Music and Choir Director for the Greater New Bethel Baptist Church in Inglewood for more than 40 years.

Douroux is the founder and CEO of the Heritage Music Foundation (HMF), an organization advocating the advancement and preservation of gospel music.
