= The Eyes of Tammy Faye (2000 film) =

2000 documentary film by Fenton Bailey and Randy Barbato

- Theatrical release poster
- Directed by: Fenton Bailey; Randy Barbato
- Produced by: Fenton Bailey; Randy Barbato
- Starring: Tammy Faye Bakker
- Narrated by: RuPaul Charles
- Cinematography: Sandra Chandler
- Edited by: Paul Wiesepape
- Music by: Jimmy Harry
- Production company: World of Wonder
- Distributed by: Lions Gate Films
- Release dates: January 25, 2000 (Sundance); July 21, 2000 (United States)
- Running time: 80 minutes
- Country: United States
- Language: English
- Box office: $1 million

The Eyes of Tammy Faye is a 2000 American documentary film about the life of Tammy Faye Bakker. Directed by Fenton Bailey and Randy Barbato, produced by their company World of Wonder, it is narrated by RuPaul.

== Legacy and home media ==
It was followed by a 2005 documentary Tammy Faye: Death Defying, which follows Bakker's struggle with inoperable stage 4 colon cancer. Both films are available on WOW Presents Plus.

== Reception ==
The Eyes of Tammy Faye has a Rotten Tomatoes score of 86% based on 36 reviews. It is listed at 23rd on the 50 Documentaries to See Before You Die on Current TV.

== Accolades ==
It won the Boston Society of Film Critics Award for Best Documentary Film and was also nominated for Independent Spirit Award for Best Documentary Feature.

== Film adaptation ==
The documentary served as the basis for a biographical film of the same title, starring Jessica Chastain as Tammy Faye and Andrew Garfield as Jim Bakker, with Cherry Jones and Vincent D'Onofrio co-starring. Released in September 2021 to critical acclaim, Chastain won the Best Actress at the 94th Academy Awards.
