= Dominion Herbal College =

Herbalist school in Burnaby, Canada

Coordinates: 49.2017°N 122.9846°W

Dominion Herbal College is North America's oldest school of herbal medicine founded in 1926 in British Columbia, Canada by Dr. Herbert Nowell. Dominion Herbal College is a post-secondary institution accredited by the Private Career Training Institutions Agency (PCTIA) offering online and distance education programs.

== Notable alumni ==
- Ella Birzneck — President (1962–1987)
- Ryan Drum
- John Christopher
- Bernard Jensen
- Earl Mindell
- Cascade Anderson Geller
- Debra St. Claire

== History and educational programs ==
Dominion Herbal College was founded in Vancouver, British Columbia, Canada in 1926 by naturopathic physician Dr. Herbert Nowell who taught botanical medicine to medical doctors prior to 1918 when such medicine was accepted and practiced by the medical profession. Dr. Nowell’s knowledge in herbal medicine was admired and appreciated by doctors in the United Kingdom, Canada and the United States.

In 1962 Ella Birzneck, RMT, MH, EP, who apprenticed with Dr. Nowell, continued the tradition and spirit of Dr. Nowell’s love of herbs and natural healing by resurrecting and reorganizing Dominion Herbal College and making the Chartered Herbalist and Master Herbalist Diploma Programs available for study by anyone with a sincere desire to gain real knowledge in the field of Herbal Medicine. In addition to opening Canada’s first health food store near Vancouver, British Columbia, Ella Birzneck was a founder of the Canadian Health Food Association and the Canadian Herbalist’s Association of British Columbia. Since 1987 members of Ella Birzneck’s family have worked to ensure that the original purpose of Dominion Herbal College is maintained.

== Accreditation and memberships ==
Dominion Herbal College is accredited by the Private Career Training Institutions Agency (PCTIA) and holds school or professional memberships with the American Herbalists Guild, the Canadian Herbalist’s Association of British Columbia and the Health Action Network Society. Dominion Herbal College is an EQA Designated Institution by the BC Ministry of Advanced Education. The Education Quality Assurance (EQA) designation is British Columbia, Canada's brand for quality post-secondary education.

Dominion Herbal College is part of the TOEFL iBT® Designated Institutions Network and the IELTS International English Language Testing System. TOEFL is the world's largest English Language Proficiency Test.
