= Earl Mindell =

Canadian-American writer and nutritionist

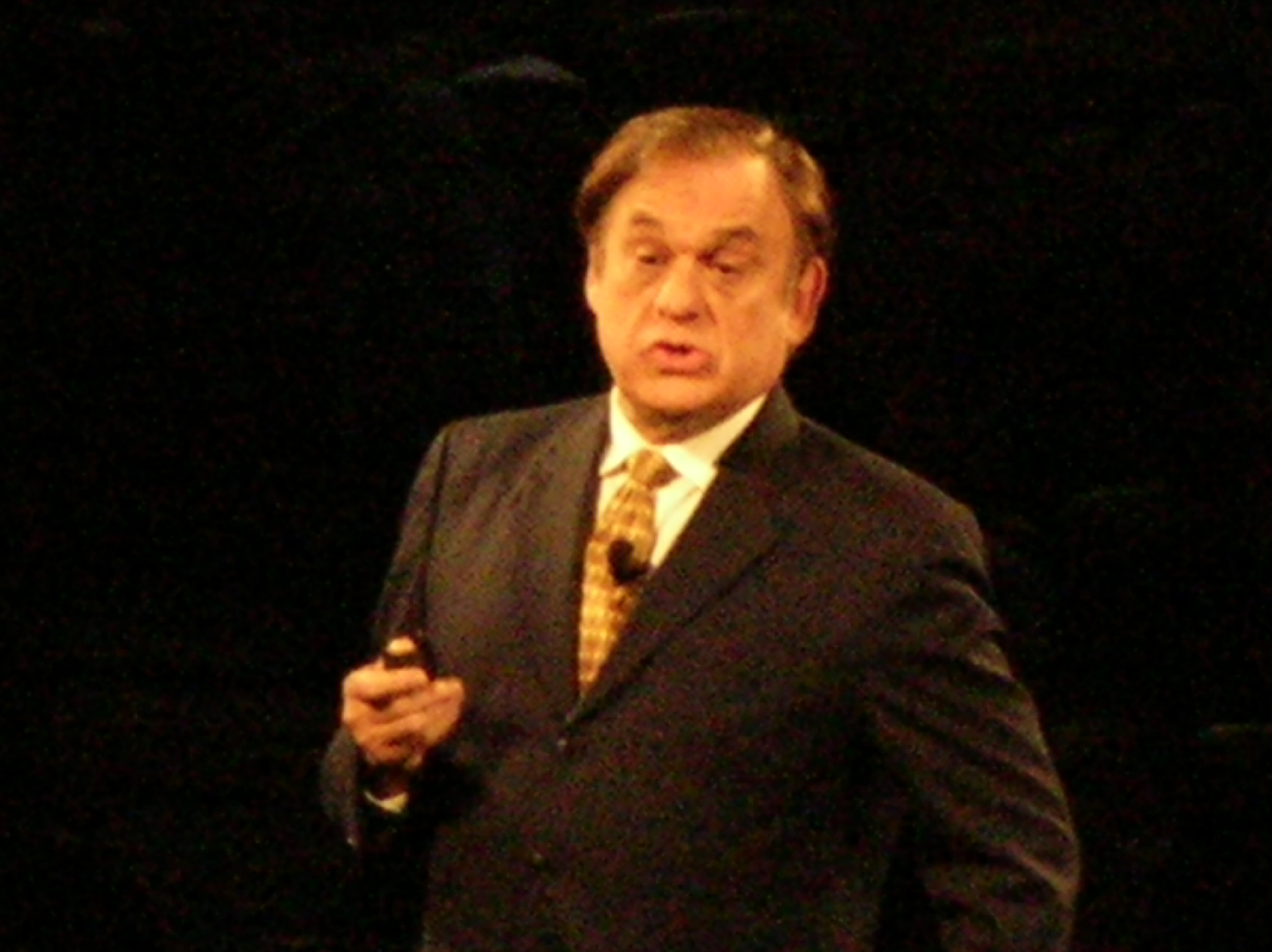
- Earl Mindell in March 2009
- Born: 20 January 1940 (age 86); Saint Boniface, Manitoba, Canada
- Occupations: Writer, Nutritionist
- Spouse: Gail Andrea Jaffe

Earl Lawrence Mindell (born January 20, 1940) is a Canadian-American writer and nutritionist who is a strong advocate of nutrition as preventive healthcare and homeopathy.

== Early life and education ==
Mindell was born to parents William and Minerva on January 20, 1940, in Saint Boniface, Manitoba. He immigrated to the United States in 1965 and was naturalized in 1972. On May 16, 1971, Mindell married Gail Andrea Jaffe; they have two children.

Mindell received a Bachelor of Science in Pharmacy from North Dakota State University in 1963. In 1995, he earned a Master Herbalist Diploma from Dominion Herbal College. Mindell earned his Ph.D. at Pacific Western University, an unaccredited institution.

== Relations with the scientific community ==
Mindell's theories on health and nutrition have been met with criticism in the scientific community. Mindell has previously promoted oral supplements of an "anti-aging" enzyme, superoxide dismutase (SOD). There is no evidence for the supposed benefits of SOD, and it is known that the enzyme would not survive the digestive process if taken orally.

Mindell made several claims about the health benefits of wolfberry juice, commercially known as "Himalayan Goji Juice", while associated with a direct-selling company called FreeLife International Inc. Mindell's claims regarding goji juice include supposed benefits for cancer patients based on evidence of cancer cell inhibition in vitro (i.e. in a dish). In an interview with Wendy Mesley on the CBC consumer television program Marketplace (aired January 24, 2007), H. Leon Bradlow, coauthor of a study that Mindell cites as support for this anti-cancer claim, says that his research does not, in fact, prove that goji has any anti-cancer properties, and that there is no scientific evidence such effects occur in vivo (i.e., when consumed). In addition, Bradlow's study was carried out at Hackensack University Medical Center, not Memorial Sloan-Kettering Cancer Center as Mindell had claimed. When faced with this information, Mindell stated in the same interview that he would stop citing the study. Mesley then went on to confront Mindell about the validity of his PhD from Pacific Western University, and Mindell asserted that his degree is "accredited in every state in the Union."

His book Earl Mindell's Vitamin Bible was criticized by James A. Lowell in 1986, in a review reprinted by Quackwatch. The book contains over 400 errors. Professor of pharmacognosy Varro Eugene Tyler noted that Earl Mindell's Herb Bible contained many inaccurate statements and unsupported claims. Mindell has also drawn criticism for his claim that habitual lying by children can be cured by large doses of B vitamins. Nutritionist Kurt Butler has described Mindell as a "pill-peddling charlatan, and that his ideas are totally unsupportable". Mindell has asserted that vitamin A is safe to take in dosages up to 100,000 IU per day, but this claim is considered by some other mainstream scientists as controversial. He has also drawn criticism for stating that many medical doctors are uninformed about vitamins.

== Selected bibliography ==
In total, Mindell has published over 50 books. His most notable publication, Earl Mindell's Vitamin Bible, is a glossary of micronutrients published in 1979 and has been updated and re-released multiple times since. An incomplete list of his books is available below.

Selected bibliography
Earl Mindell's Vitamin Bible	1979	Rawson-Wade		892561068
Earl Mindell's Vitamin Bible For Your Kids	1981	Rawson-Wade		892561831
Parent's Nutrition Bible: A Guide To Raising Healthy Children	1992	Hay House		1561700185
Earl Mindell's Herb Bible	1992	Simon & Schuster		684849062
Live Longer and Feel Better with Vitamins and Minerals	1994	Keats		879836520
Earl Mindell's Food as Medicine	1994	Simon & Schuster		671797557
Garlic: The Miracle Nutrient	1996	Keats		879837403
Earl Mindell's What You Should Know About: 22 Ways to a Healthier Heart	1996	Keats	Virginia Hopkins	879837527
Earl Mindell's What You Should Know About: Beautiful Hair, Skin and Nails	1996	Keats	Virginia Hopkins	879837470
Earl Mindell's What You Should Know About: Better Nutrition for Athletes	1996	Keats	Virginia Hopkins	879837500
Earl Mindell's What You Should Know About: Creating Your Personal Vitamin Plan	1996	Keats	Virginia Hopkins	879837462
Earl Mindell's What You Should Know About: Herbs for Your Health	1996	Keats	Virginia Hopkins	879837497
Earl Mindell's What You Should Know About: Homeopathic Remedies	1996	Keats	Virginia Hopkins	879837519
Earl Mindell's What You Should Know About: Natural Health for Men	1996	Keats	Virginia Hopkins	879837535
Earl Mindell's What You Should Know About: Natural Health for Women	1996	Keats	Virginia Hopkins	879837543
Earl Mindell's What You Should Know About: Nutrition for Active Lifestyles	1996	Keats	Virginia Hopkins	879837446
Earl Mindell's What You Should Know About: the Super Antioxidant Miracle	1996	Keats	Virginia Hopkins	879837217
Earl Mindell's Anti-Aging Bible	1996	Simon & Schuster		684811065
Earl Mindell's What You Should Know About: Fiber and Digestion	1997	Keats	Virginia Hopkins	879837454
Earl Mindell's What You Should Know About: Trace Minerals	1997	Keats	Virginia Hopkins	879837489
Earl Mindell's Vitamin Bible for the 21st Century	1999	Warner		446607029
Earl Mindell's Arthritis: What You Need To Know	2000	Avery	Melissa Block	158333081X
The Arthritis Miracle: How Ginger Extract Can Reduce Inflammatory Joint Pain	2000	Avery		1583330607
Earl Mindell's Secrets of Natural Health: A Complete Program for Vibrant Well-Being	2000	Keats	Virginia Hopkins	879839856
Earl Mindell's New Herb Bible	2000	Simon & Schuster		684856395
Earl Mindell's Russian Energy Secret	2001	Basic Health Pub.	Donald R. Yance	1591200008
Earl Mindell's Complete Guide to Natural Cures	2001	Keats	Virginia Hopkins	130327034
Earl Mindell's Goji: The Himalayan Health Secret	2003	Momentum Media	Rick Handel	967285526
Earl Mindell's New Vitamin Bible	2004	Warner	Hester Mundis	446614092
Easing the Pain of Arthritis Naturally	2005	Basic Health Pub.		1591201098
Earl Mindell's Goji: The Himalayan Health Secret	2005	Momentum Media		967285577
