= Private Career Training Institutions Agency =

The Private Career Training Institutions Agency (PCTIA) was the provincial regulatory body of British Columbia, Canada responsible for accrediting private post-secondary institutions and ensuring minimum standards of quality and consumer protection. Accreditation by the PCTIA qualified an institution to participate in provincial and federal financial assistance programs, but did not certify that an institution's courses are transferable to other institutions.

In April 2014, the Ministry of Advanced Education announced they would assume direct responsibility for the regulation of private career training in BC. The PCTIA was dissolved on September 1, 2016 when the responsibility for the regulation of private career training was brought into government.
