= Microlechia chretieni =

Scientific classification
- Kingdom: Animalia
- Phylum: Arthropoda
- Clade: Pancrustacea
- Class: Insecta
- Order: Lepidoptera
- Family: Gelechiidae
- Genus: Microlechia
- Species: M. chretieni

Binomial name
- Microlechia chretieni Turati, 1924

Synonyms
- Phthorimaea microcasis Meyrick, 1929; Hedma microcasis (Meyrick, 1929); Gelechia micradelpha Walsingham, 1900 (preocc. Lower, 1897); Hedma abzacella Dumont, 1932; Teleia hyoscyamella Amsel & Hering, 1931 (preocc. Rebel, 1912); Teleia hyoscyami Amsel, 1935; Ephysteris aellographa Janse, 1960; Megalocypha polioptera Janse, 1960

Species of moth

Microlechia chretieni is a moth in the family Gelechiidae. It was described by Emilio Turati in 1924. It is found in South Europe (France, Portugal, Spain, Crete, Sardinia), on Madeira, Canary Islands, in North Africa (Tunisia), western Asia (Palestine, Israel, Saudi Arabia, southern Iran, western Pakistan), and in Southern Africa (Mozambique, Namibia, and South Africa).

The wingspan is about 9 mm for males and 8 mm for females. The forewings are pale brownish ochreous, with scattered blackish speckling. This appears in a very faintly indicated oblique transverse band, leaving the costa at about one-fourth and crossing the fold between two minute spots of raised blackish scales, the first below the fold, slightly anterior to that on the cell. Another pair of minute raised spots is situated one at the end of the cell, the other a little beyond it, above the outer extremity of the fold. Beyond and above these the costal and terminal margins are studded with groups of blackish scales at the base of the pale fawn-ochreous cilia, through which a slender dark line is traceable around the apex, but not toward the tornus. The hindwings are very pale bluish grey.

The larvae feed on various Solanaceae: Lycium (Lycium europaeum, Lycium intricatum, Lycium afrum, Lycium barbarum), Hyoscyamus (Hyoscyamus aureus), and Solanum. They mine the leaves of their host plant.

The name honours French entomologist Pierre Chrétien.
