= Scrobipalpa portosanctana =

Scientific classification
- Kingdom: Animalia
- Phylum: Arthropoda
- Clade: Pancrustacea
- Class: Insecta
- Order: Lepidoptera
- Family: Gelechiidae
- Genus: Scrobipalpa
- Species: S. portosanctana

Binomial name
- Scrobipalpa portosanctana (Stainton, [1859])

Synonyms
- Gelechia portosanctana Stainton, [1859]; Scrobipalpa gallincolella Mann, 1872; Lita oasis Rebel, 1901; Gnorimoschema lyciella Walsingham, 1900; Gnorimoschema philolycii Hering, 1957; Gelechia eremaula Meyrick, 1891; Lita desertella Rebel, 1901; Phthorimaea bertramella Lucas, 1940; Teleia leroyella Lucas, 1949; Gnorimoschema reisseri Povolný & Gregor, 1955

Species of moth

Scrobipalpa portosanctana is a moth of the family Gelechiidae. It was described by Henry Tibbats Stainton in 1859. It is found in Spain, France, Italy, Croatia, as well as on Sardinia, Corsica, Sicily, Malta and Madeira. It is also present in North Africa and the Near East.

The larvae feed on Lycium barbarum and Lycium europaeum. They mine the leaves of their host plant. They have a grey body with dark length lines and a blackish head.
