= Longevity fruit =

Longevity fruit may refer to the fruit of:

- Siraitia grosvenorii
- Lycium species:
  - Lycium barbarum
  - Lycium chinense
- Arachis hypogaea
