= Coleophora mosasaurus =

Scientific classification
- Kingdom: Animalia
- Phylum: Arthropoda
- Class: Insecta
- Order: Lepidoptera
- Family: Coleophoridae
- Genus: Coleophora
- Species: C. mosasaurus

Binomial name
- Coleophora mosasaurus (Falkovitsh, 1988)

Synonyms
- Omphalopoda mosasaurus Falkovitsh, 1988

Species of moth

Coleophora mosasaurus is a moth of the family Coleophoridae. It is found in the Chinese provinces of Shaanxi and Qinghai and in Turkmenistan.

The wingspan is 14–15 mm (0.55–0.59 in).

The larvae feed on Lycium species, including Lycium kopetdaghi and Lycium barbarum. They feed on the leaves of their host plant.
