= Microlechia lycia =

Scientific classification
- Kingdom: Animalia
- Phylum: Arthropoda
- Clade: Pancrustacea
- Class: Insecta
- Order: Lepidoptera
- Family: Gelechiidae
- Genus: Microlechia
- Species: M. lycia

Binomial name
- Microlechia lycia (H.-H. Li, 2001)

Synonyms
- Hedma lycia H.-H., 2001

Species of moth

Microlechia lycia is a moth in the family Gelechiidae. It was described by Hou-Hun Li in 2001. It is found in Korea and Shaanxi, China.

The wingspan is 10–11 mm. Adults are similar to Microlechia iranica, but can be distinguished by the male and female genitalia.

The larvae feed on Lycium barbarum.
