= Coleophora ningxiana =

Scientific classification
- Kingdom: Animalia
- Phylum: Arthropoda
- Class: Insecta
- Order: Lepidoptera
- Family: Coleophoridae
- Genus: Coleophora
- Species: C. ningxiana

Binomial name
- Coleophora ningxiana H.H.Li, 2006

Species of moth

Coleophora ningxiana is a moth of the family Coleophoridae which is endemic to China (Ningxia).

The wingspan is about 14 millimetres (0.55 in).

The larvae feed on wild and cultivated Lycium barbarum. They live on branches and leaves of their host plant.
