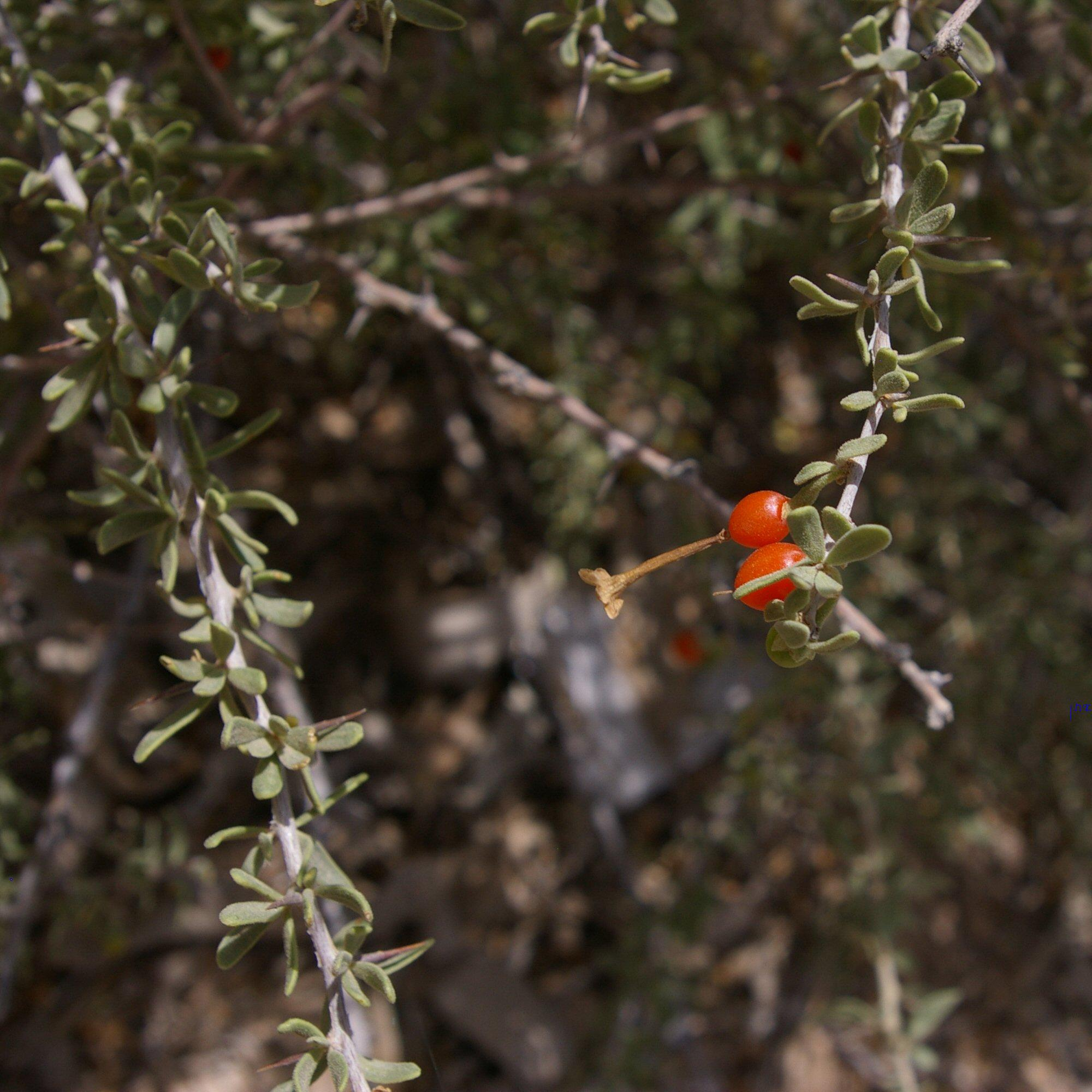
- Lycium shawii

Scientific classification
- Kingdom: Plantae
- Clade: Embryophytes
- Clade: Tracheophytes
- Clade: Spermatophytes
- Clade: Angiosperms
- Clade: Eudicots
- Clade: Asterids
- Order: Solanales
- Family: Solanaceae
- Genus: Lycium
- Species: L. shawii

Binomial name
- Lycium shawii Roem. & Schult.

= Lycium shawii =

Species of shrub

Lycium shawii, desert thorn or Arabian boxthorn is a species of thorny shrub adapted to desert environments, and can be found throughout the Arabian Peninsula, and some places in Africa. The thin leaved, rigid bush grows up to 3 metres (9.8 feet) high, with a lot of branches and alternating spines that vary in size, and grow along the branches and on their tips. The leaves narrow towards their base. It produces small whitish-pink or purple flowers from September until April, and red pea-sized seedy berries that are edible. Habitats include gravel plains and foothills up to 4,000 ft (1,200 m), as well as wadis. Plants often growing nearby include Acacia tortilis and Prosopis cineraria. In the past specimens have been included in the taxon Lycium europaeum.

== Uses ==
The stems, leaves and berries are used in traditional medicine. In Yemen, the pounded leaves of this shrub have been used as a cure for eye ailments. The berries have a laxative effect and were used in traditional medicine to relieve constipation and as a diuretic. Livestock eat new growth on the plant.

== See also ==
- History of Al-Baqi' Cemetery in Medina, Hejaz
- Dhofar, Oman
