= Streptomyces lycii =

Scientific classification
- Domain: Bacteria
- Kingdom: Bacillati
- Phylum: Actinomycetota
- Class: Actinomycetia
- Order: Streptomycetales
- Family: Streptomycetaceae
- Genus: Streptomyces
- Species: S. lycii

Binomial name
- Streptomyces lycii Ma et al. 2020

Type strain
- TRM 66187

Species of bacterium

Streptomyces lycii is a bacterium species from the genus of Streptomyces which has been isolated from the plant Lycium ruthenicum from Alar in Xinjiang.

== See also ==
- List of Streptomyces species
