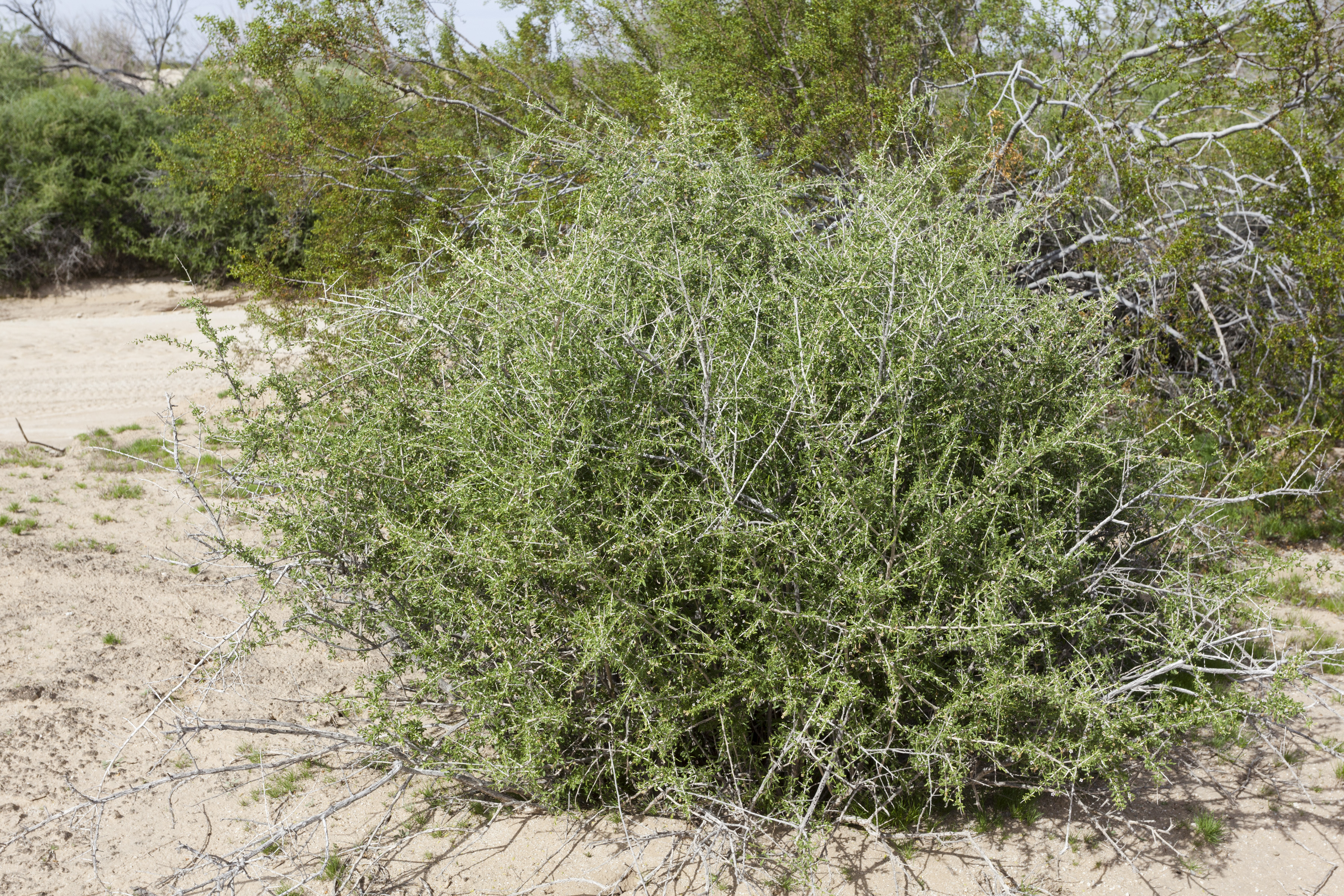

Scientific classification
- Kingdom: Plantae
- Clade: Embryophytes
- Clade: Tracheophytes
- Clade: Spermatophytes
- Clade: Angiosperms
- Clade: Eudicots
- Clade: Asterids
- Order: Solanales
- Family: Solanaceae
- Genus: Lycium
- Species: L. californicum

Binomial name
- Lycium californicum Nutt. ex Gray

Varieties
- L. c. var. californicum L. c. var. arizonicum

= Lycium californicum =

Species of flowering plant

Lycium californicum is a spreading shrub in the nightshade family known by the common names California boxthorn and California desert-thorn.

This plant, as Lycium californicum var. californicum, is native to the Coastal sage scrub and coastal bluffs along the coast of Southern California to northern Baja California and the northern and southern Channel Islands. As Lycium californicum var. arizonicum it is found in the Sonoran Desert in southern Arizona.

== Description ==
This thorny shrub, with rigid-spreading branches. Has thick, fleshy, bulbous 3–10 millimetres (0.12–0.39 in) green leaves. The widely triangular bell-shaped white flowers have purple streaks or spots. It bears bright red shiny berries 3–6 millimetres (0.12–0.24 in) in diameter, and oblong seeds.

== Varieties ==
=== L. c. var. californicum ===
The shrub variety Lycium californicum var. californicum is a member of the chaparral ecosystem and other plant communities of the direct coastline from Santa Barbara County south into Baja California, below 150 metres (490 ft) altitude. It is most plentiful in the ecotone between salt marshes-estuaries and the coastal sage scrub plant community. The destruction of this specific ecotone in this highly developed region has led to a reduction in the population of this plant there. It extends into the Inland Empire floodplains.

=== L. c. var. arizonicum ===
Another variety, Lycium californicum var. arizonicum, is found in riparian Arroyos in the Yuma Desert, Tule Desert, and greater Sonoran Desert across southern Arizona.

== See also ==
- Boxthorn — Lycium
- California coastal sage and chaparral- (subecoregion)
- Coastal sage scrub — (plant association)
