= Microlechia maculata =

Scientific classification
- Kingdom: Animalia
- Phylum: Arthropoda
- Clade: Pancrustacea
- Class: Insecta
- Order: Lepidoptera
- Family: Gelechiidae
- Genus: Microlechia
- Species: M. maculata

Binomial name
- Microlechia maculata (Povolný, 1978)

Synonyms
- Megalocypha maculata Povolný, 1978

Species of moth

Microlechia maculata is a moth in the family Gelechiidae. It was described by Povolný in 1978. It is found in South Africa.

The length of the forewings is about 4.8 mm.
