= Lycium sokotranum =

Conservation status
- Least Concern (IUCN 3.1)

Scientific classification
- Kingdom: Plantae
- Clade: Tracheophytes
- Clade: Angiosperms
- Clade: Eudicots
- Clade: Asterids
- Order: Solanales
- Family: Solanaceae
- Genus: Lycium
- Species: L. sokotranum

Binomial name
- Lycium sokotranum R.Wagner & Vierh. (1906)

Species of flowering plant

Lycium sokotranum is a species of flowering plant in the nightshade family, Solanaceae, that is endemic to the Socotra archipelago in the Indian Ocean (Yemen). It is a spiny, much-branched shrub that is <2 m tall. It is widespread and often abundant on coastal plains and limestone plateaus of Socotra and on the central plains of Abd al Kuri.
