= Lycium tenue =

Scientific classification
- Kingdom: Plantae
- Clade: Tracheophytes
- Clade: Angiosperms
- Clade: Eudicots
- Clade: Asterids
- Order: Solanales
- Family: Solanaceae
- Genus: Lycium
- Species: L. tenue

Binomial name
- Lycium tenue Willd.

Species of shrub

Lycium tenue is a shrub in the nightshade family (Solanaceae) indigenous to South Africa.

== Distribution ==
This species is indigenous to the Western Cape Province, South Africa. It occurs as far west as Ceres, southwards into the Overberg region, as far north as the Swartberg mountains, and as far east as Calitzdorp. Its habitat is typically dry riverbeds and their surrounds, often in sands and gravels derived from limestone.

== Description ==
Lycium tenue is a small, stiff, spiny shrub. The young stems are grey-white with striations, while the older stems become dark grey. The spines are of randomly varying lengths along the branch.

Like many other Lycium species, the leaves are pale green and narrowly obovate in shape.

The flowers emerge from the leaf axils. The corolla is narrowly trumpet shaped, with five large reflexed lobes (petals). The stamens are extended and very clearly exserted from the corolla mouth. The calyx is tubular, and relatively short, covering less than half of the corolla tube.

The fruits are small, elliptic-to-ovoid, red berries.
