= Microlechia melongenae =

Scientific classification
- Kingdom: Animalia
- Phylum: Arthropoda
- Clade: Pancrustacea
- Class: Insecta
- Order: Lepidoptera
- Family: Gelechiidae
- Genus: Microlechia
- Species: M. melongenae

Binomial name
- Microlechia melongenae (Povolný & Bradley, 1980)

Synonyms
- Megalocypha melongenae Povolný & Bradley, 1980

Species of moth

Microlechia melongenae is a moth in the family Gelechiidae. It was described by Povolný and Bradley in 1980. It is found in southern India.

The length of the forewings is 3.8-3.9 mm.

The larvae feed on Solanum melongena. They mine the leaves of their host plant.
