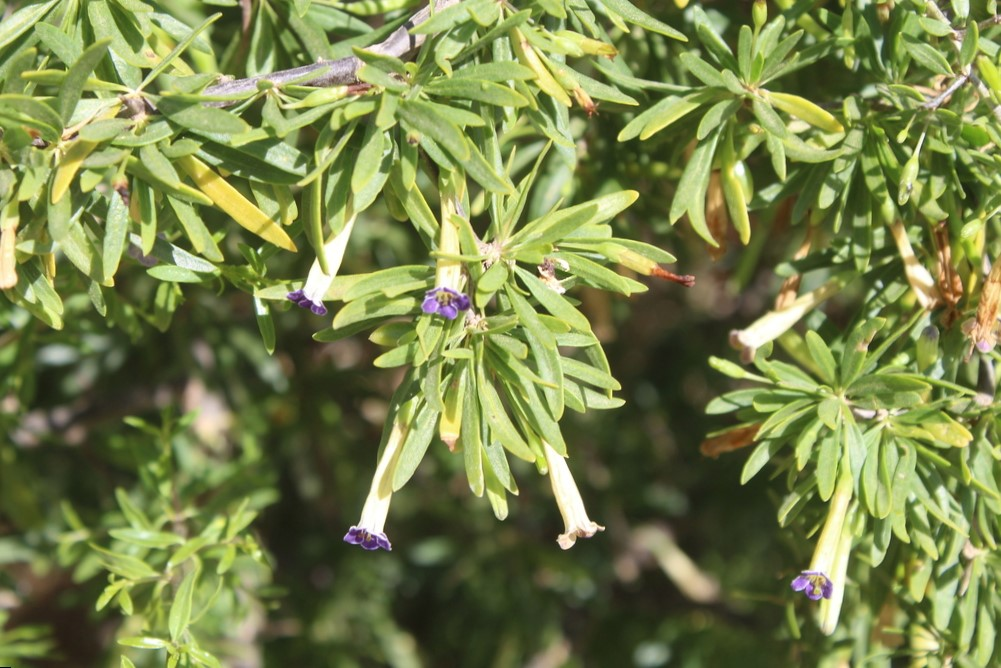

Scientific classification
- Kingdom: Plantae
- Clade: Tracheophytes
- Clade: Angiosperms
- Clade: Eudicots
- Clade: Asterids
- Order: Solanales
- Family: Solanaceae
- Genus: Lycium
- Species: L. oxycarpum

Binomial name
- Lycium oxycarpum Dunal (1852)

Synonyms
- Lycium austrinum Miers (1854)

= Lycium oxycarpum =

Species of shrub

Lycium oxycarpum is a shrub in the nightshade family (Solanaceae) indigenous to the Karoo regions of South Africa.

== Distribution ==
The species is native to the Western Cape, Northern Cape, Eastern Cape, and Free State provinces in South Africa, where it tends to occur in dry karrooid areas inland (the Great Karoo and Little Karoo regions). It is also found in southwestern Angola.

== Description ==
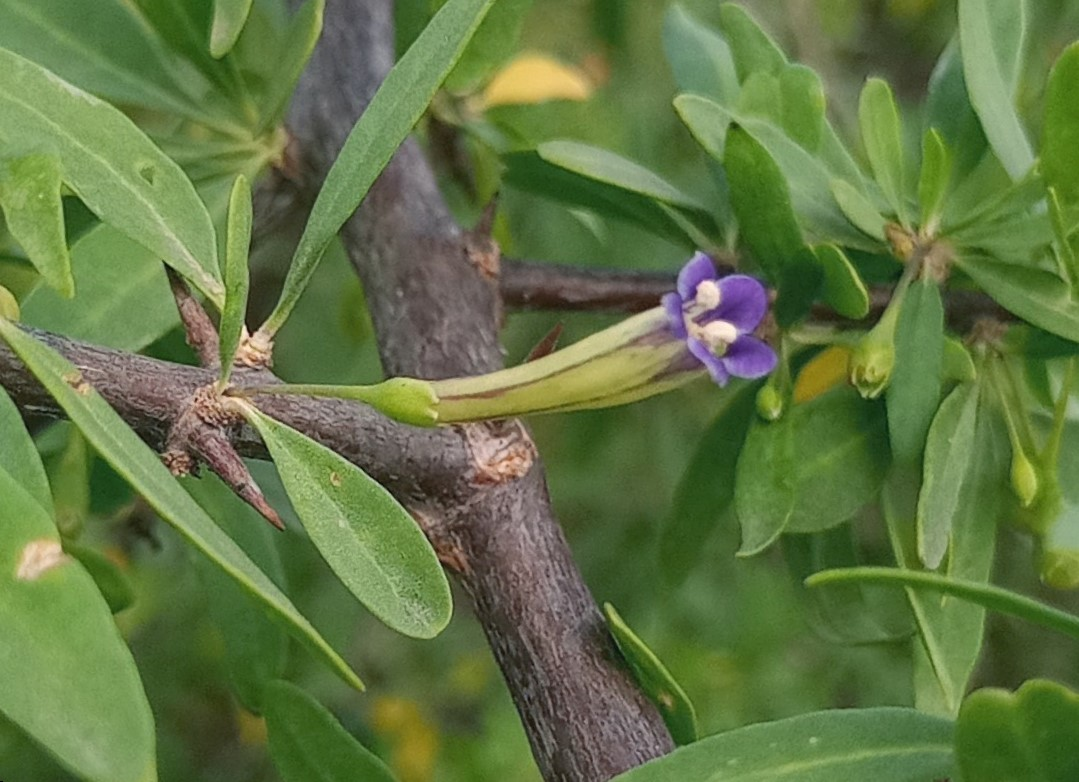
The flowers of Lycium oxycarpum are distinctive

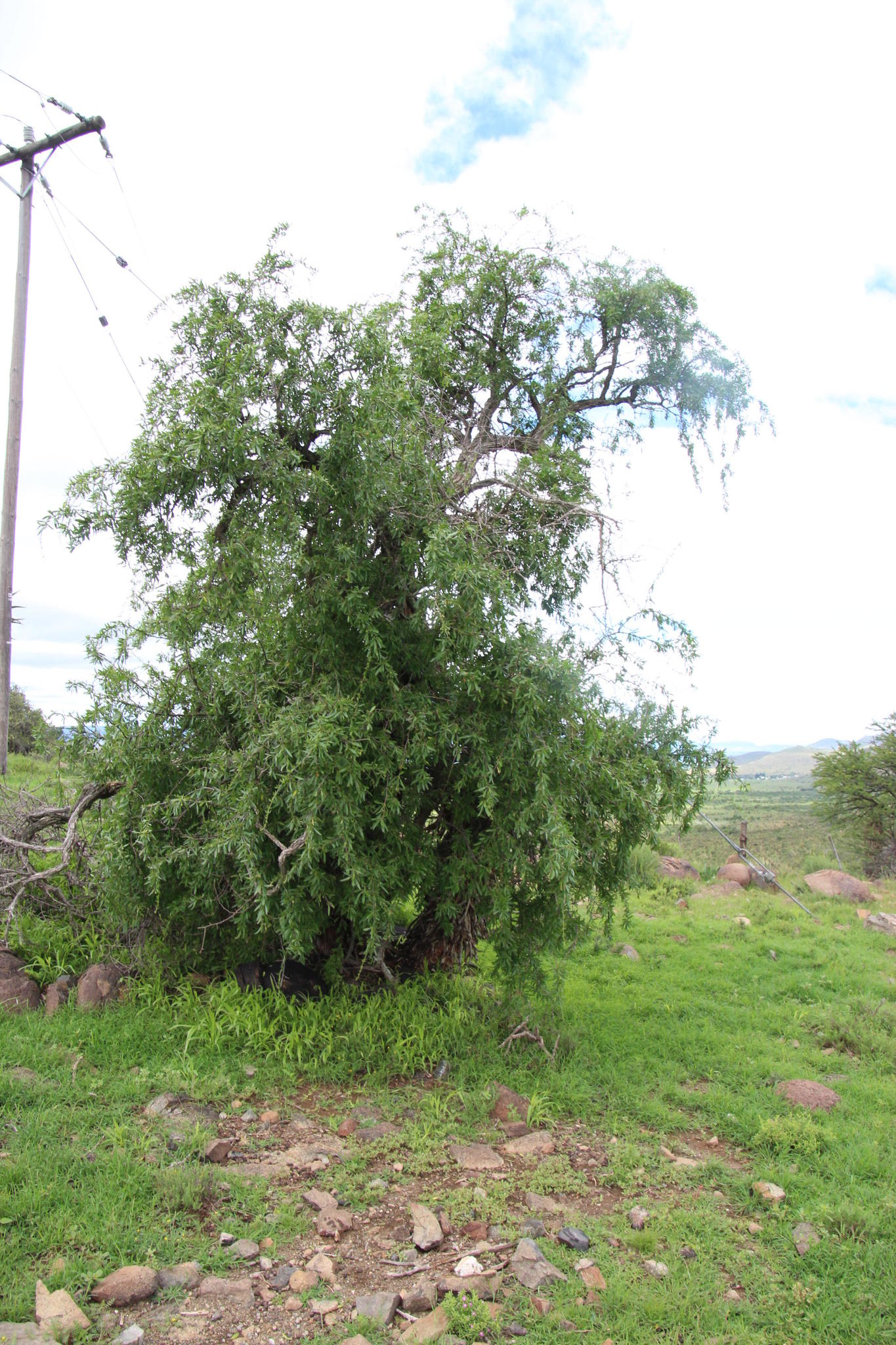
Though initially a shrub, Lycium oxycarpum can eventually grow into a small tree

Lycium oxycarpum is a large shrub which, unlike many of its Lycium relatives, can eventually grow into a small tree (max. 5 m. in height). The branches are curving and the younger branches quite sturdy, giving the species a distinctive appearance. The branches are covered in short thorns that are of approximately equal length along the length of each branch. It shares these characters with its close relative, Lycium bosciifolium, but they nonetheless help to distinguish L. oxycarpum from most of its other relatives.

Like many other Lycium species, the leaves are oblong, to narrowly-elliptic or obovate in shape. They are bright green, and a slightly lighter colour on their undersides.

The mostly solitary flowers emerge from the leaf axils. The corolla has a long, funnel-shaped tube, cream-coloured with longitudinal lines, tipped with small, mauve lobes (petals). The calyx is small and covers only a small portion at the base of the flower tube.

The flowers are the most distinctive characteristic of this species, and they serve to distinguish it from all other Lycium species in Africa.
