= Lycium humile =

Scientific classification
- Kingdom: Plantae
- Clade: Tracheophytes
- Clade: Angiosperms
- Clade: Eudicots
- Clade: Asterids
- Order: Solanales
- Family: Solanaceae
- Genus: Lycium
- Species: L. humile

Binomial name
- Lycium humile Phil.

Species of plant

Lycium humile is a species of flowering plant in the family Solanaceae. It is native to northern Chile and northwestern Argentina. A low-lying shrub, it is typically found in the subalpine or subarctic biome. Unusually for the Solanaceae, it is an extremophile halophyte.
