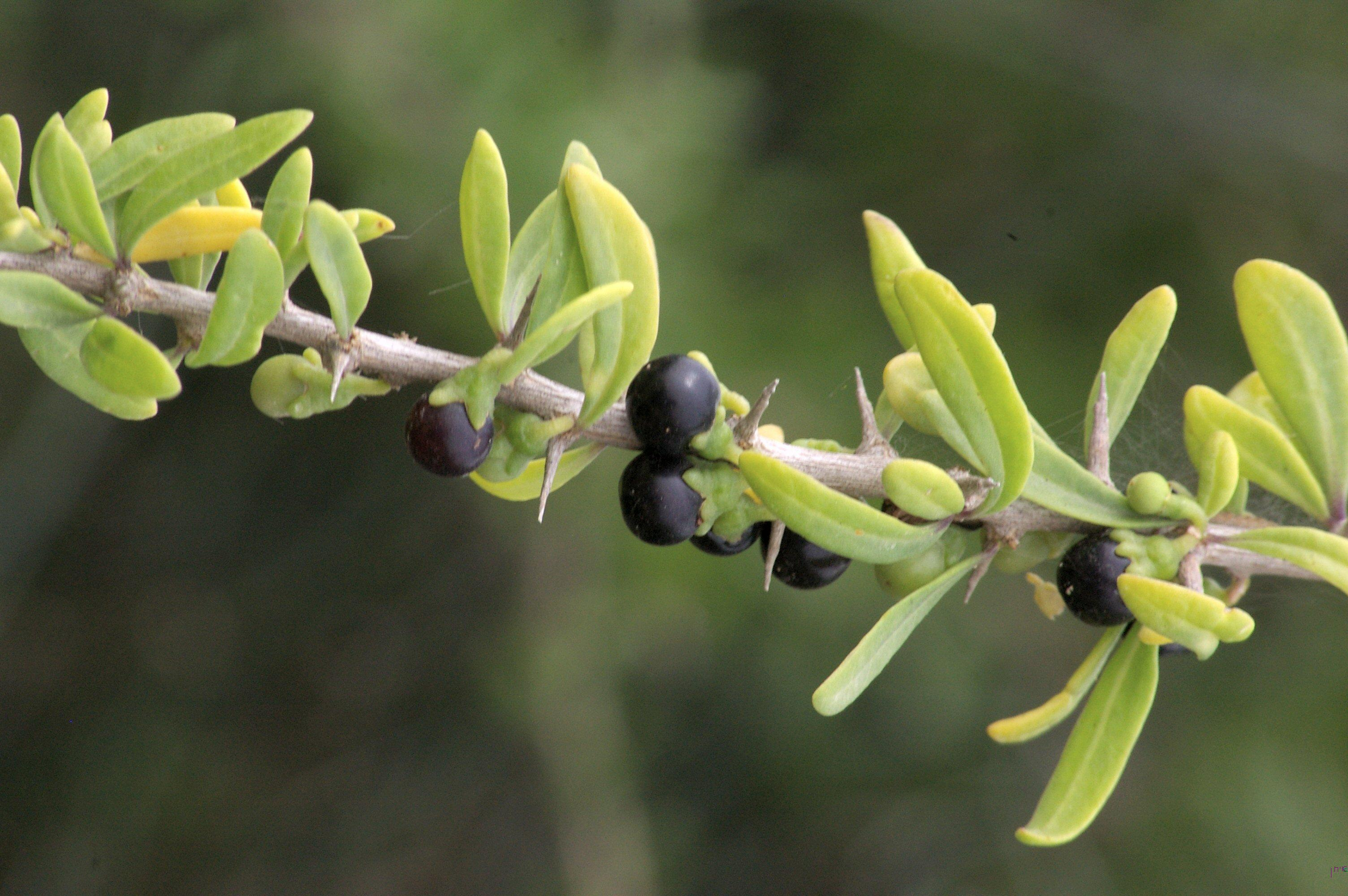
- Lycium schweinfurthii fruits

Scientific classification
- Kingdom: Plantae
- Clade: Tracheophytes
- Clade: Angiosperms
- Clade: Eudicots
- Clade: Asterids
- Order: Solanales
- Family: Solanaceae
- Genus: Lycium
- Species: L. schweinfurthii

Binomial name
- Lycium schweinfurthii Dammer

= Lycium schweinfurthii =

Species of flowering plant

Lycium schweinfurthii is a species of flowering plant in the family Solanaceae. The plant occurs in the south of the Mediterranean in Algeria, Tunisia, Libya, Egypt, Israel, Cyprus and southern Aegean (Crete, Karpathos, Rhodes) and Sicily and Pantelleria.
