= Lycium torreyi =

Conservation status
- Apparently Secure (NatureServe)

Scientific classification
- Kingdom: Plantae
- Clade: Tracheophytes
- Clade: Angiosperms
- Clade: Eudicots
- Clade: Asterids
- Order: Solanales
- Family: Solanaceae
- Genus: Lycium
- Species: L. torreyi

Binomial name
- Lycium torreyi A.Gray

Species of flowering plant

Lycium torreyi is a species of flowering plant in the nightshade family known by the common name Torrey wolfberry. It is native to northern Mexico and the southwestern United States from California to Texas.

This plant is a spreading shrub reaching 3 metres (9.8 ft) in maximum height. It may be spiny or spineless. It may form thickets. The lance-shaped leaves are up to 5 centimetres (2.0 in) long. The funnel-shaped flowers are greenish lavender to whitish and measure up to 1.5 centimetres (0.59 in) long. They are borne in fascicles in the leaf axils. The fruit is a juicy red or orange berry up to 1 centimetre (0.39 in) wide.

This plant occurs in the Chihuahuan Desert, where it is characteristic of the mesquite-fourwing saltbush plant community. Other plants in the habitat may include creosotebush, tarbush, agave, and alkali sacaton.
