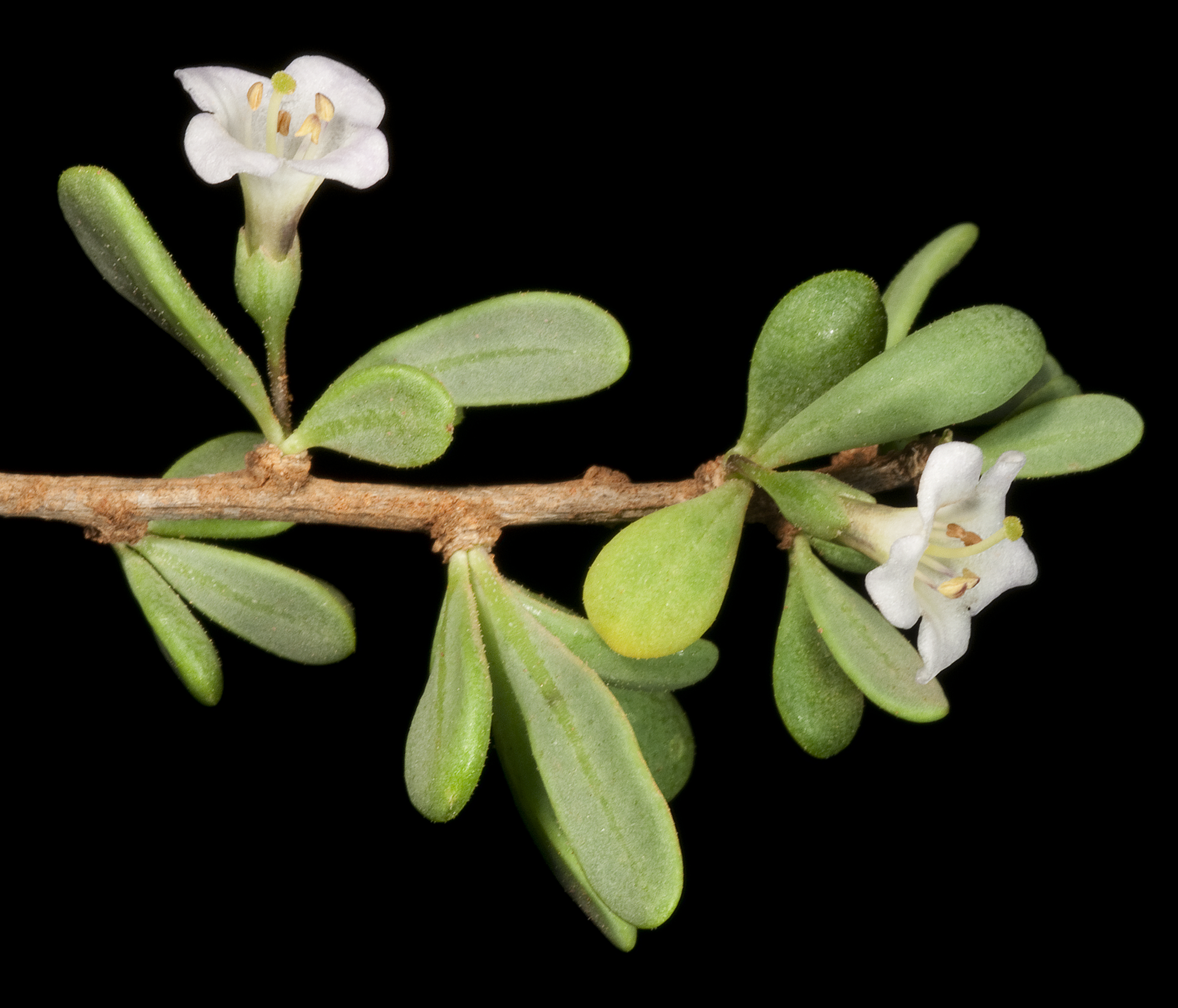

Scientific classification
- Kingdom: Plantae
- Clade: Tracheophytes
- Clade: Angiosperms
- Clade: Eudicots
- Clade: Asterids
- Order: Solanales
- Family: Solanaceae
- Genus: Lycium
- Species: L. australe

Binomial name
- Lycium australe F.Muell.

= Lycium australe =

Species of plant

Lycium australe, the Australian boxthorn, is a native Australian plant with large sharp woody spines, small leaves and very small berries. It is closely related to Lycium ferocissimum (African boxthorn), which is listed as an invasive weed in Australia, New Zealand and Cyprus.

It is possible to differentiate between these two species using the following features:

	L. ferocissimum	L. australe
Leaf length (mm)	6 - 40	3 - 25
Leaf width (mm)	2 - 20	1.5 - 3
Shape of berries	Round	Ovoid
Width of berries (mm)	5 - 10	2 - 5
Seeds per berry	30 - 70	5 - 20

== Distribution ==
Lycium australe is endemic to the mainland of Australia, and is found in New South Wales, Victoria, South Australia and Western Australia.

== Habitat ==
This plant grows in arid and semi-arid areas, in subsaline soils at the edges of claypans and salt lakes.

== Taxonomy and naming ==
The plant was first described by Ferdinand von Mueller in 1859, and its specific epithet, australe, comes from the Latin adjective, australis, -is, -e, ("south/southern"), thus describing the plant as coming from the southern hemisphere. It has no synonyms.
