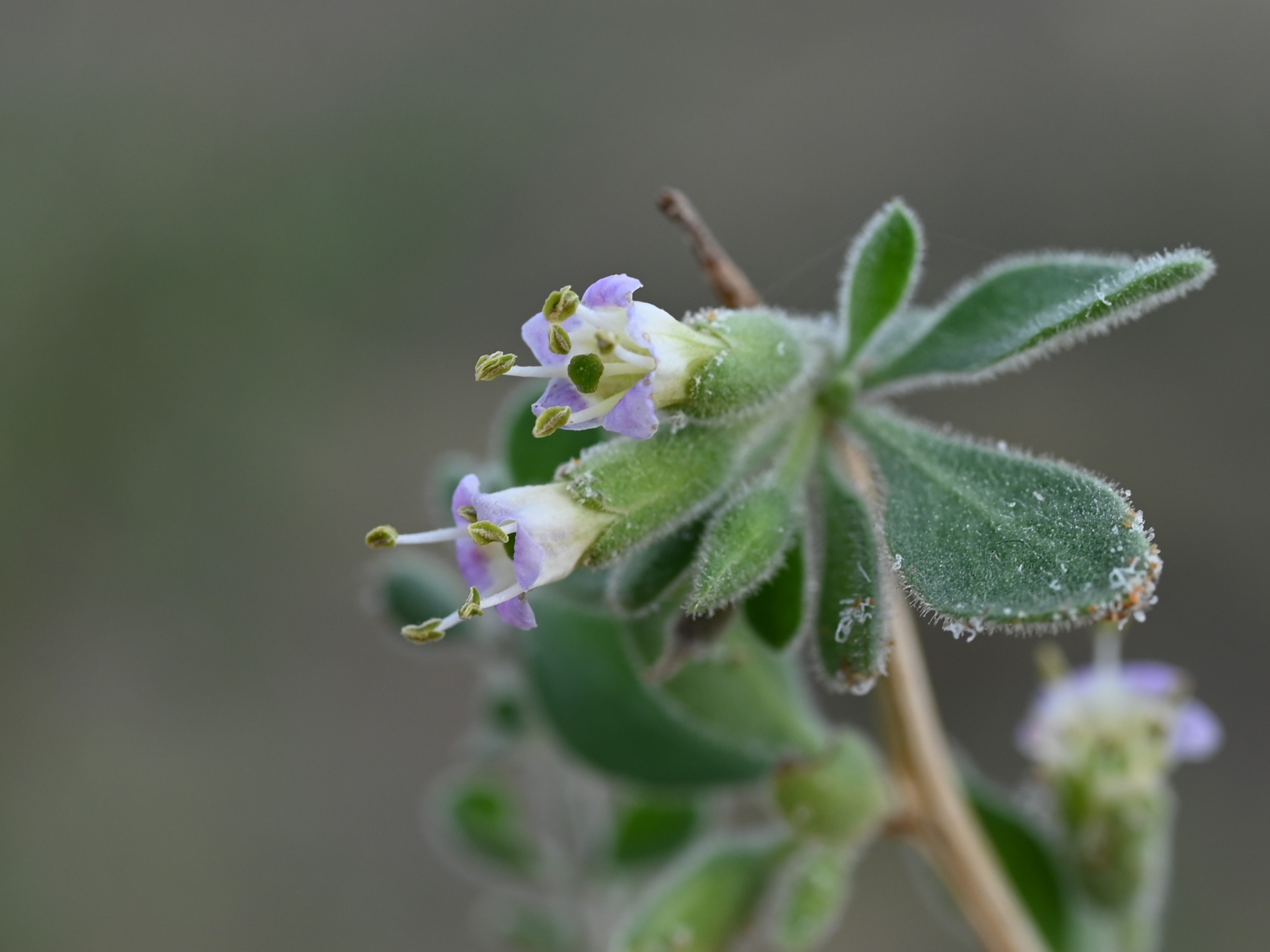
- Close-up of flowers
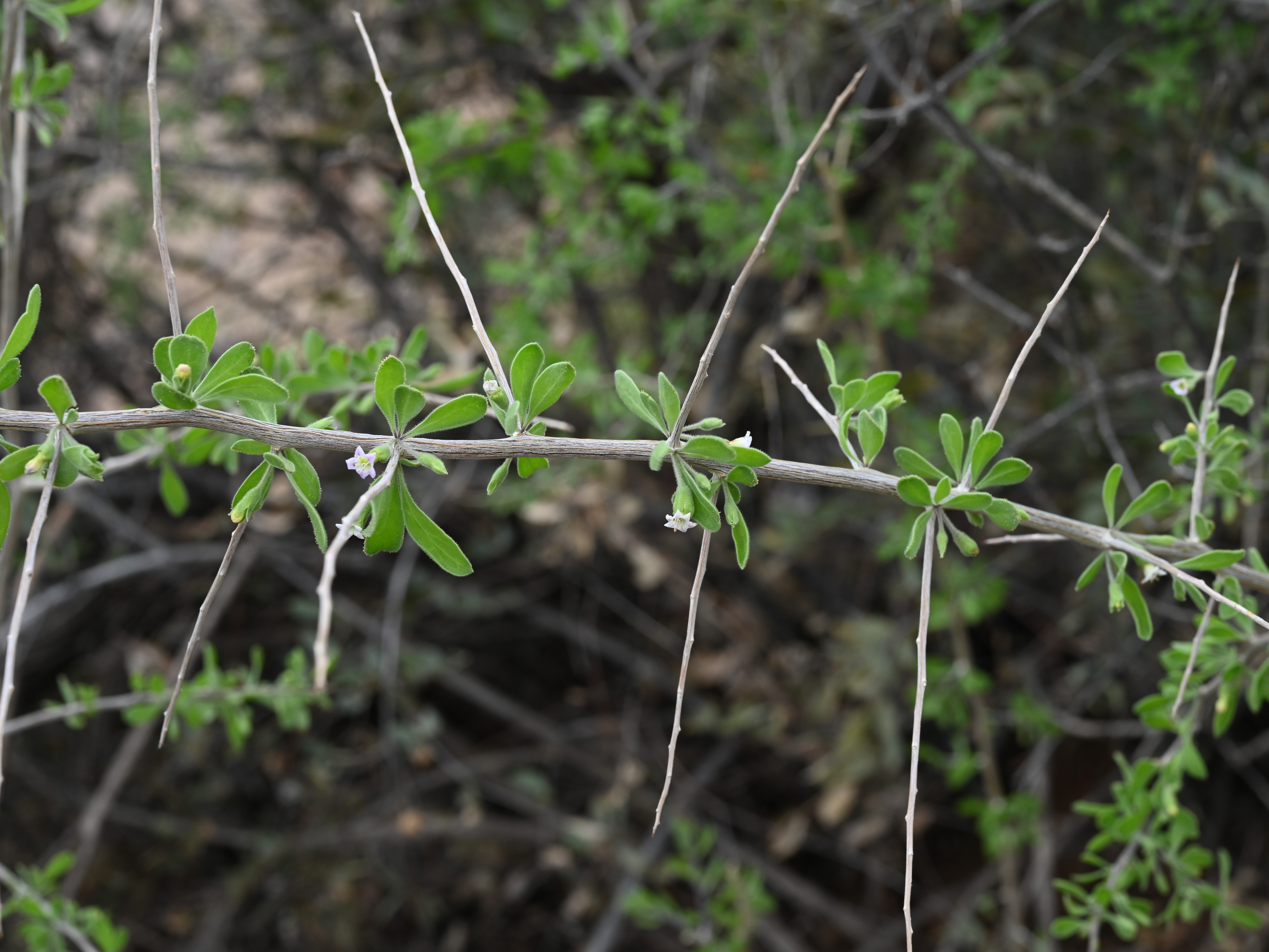
- Branch

Scientific classification
- Kingdom: Plantae
- Clade: Tracheophytes
- Clade: Angiosperms
- Clade: Eudicots
- Clade: Asterids
- Order: Solanales
- Family: Solanaceae
- Genus: Lycium
- Species: L. exsertum

Binomial name
- Lycium exsertum A.Gray

Synonyms
- Lycium fremontii var. bigelovii A.Gray; Lycium retusum B.L.Rob. & Fernald

= Lycium exsertum =

Species of plant

Lycium exsertum, the Arizona desert-thorn, is a species of flowering plant in the family Solanaceae. It is native to southern Arizona and northwestern Mexico. A large shrub reaching 12 ft (3.7 m), it is typically found in deserts and scrublands on slopes and alluvial washes.
