= Microlechia rhamnifoliae =

Scientific classification
- Kingdom: Animalia
- Phylum: Arthropoda
- Clade: Pancrustacea
- Class: Insecta
- Order: Lepidoptera
- Family: Gelechiidae
- Genus: Microlechia
- Species: M. rhamnifoliae

Binomial name
- Microlechia rhamnifoliae (Amsel & Hering, 1931)

Synonyms
- Lita rhamnifoliae Amsel & Hering, 1931; Hedma rhamnifoliae; Lita rhamnifoliae Amsel, 1935

Species of moth

Microlechia rhamnifoliae is a moth in the family Gelechiidae. It was described by Hans Georg Amsel and Erich Martin Hering in 1931. It is found on the Canary Islands and Cyprus, as well as in Morocco, Greece, Israel, Saudi Arabia, Namibia, and South Africa.
