= Microlechia lyciella =

Scientific classification
- Domain: Eukaryota
- Kingdom: Animalia
- Phylum: Arthropoda
- Class: Insecta
- Order: Lepidoptera
- Family: Gelechiidae
- Genus: Microlechia
- Species: M. lyciella

Binomial name
- Microlechia lyciella (Falkovitsh & Bidzilya, 2003)

Synonyms
- Hedma lyciella Falkovitsh & Bidzilya, 2003

Species of moth

Microlechia lyciella is a moth in the family Gelechiidae. It was described by Mark I. Falkovitsh and Oleksiy V. Bidzilya in 2003. It is found in Uzbekistan.
