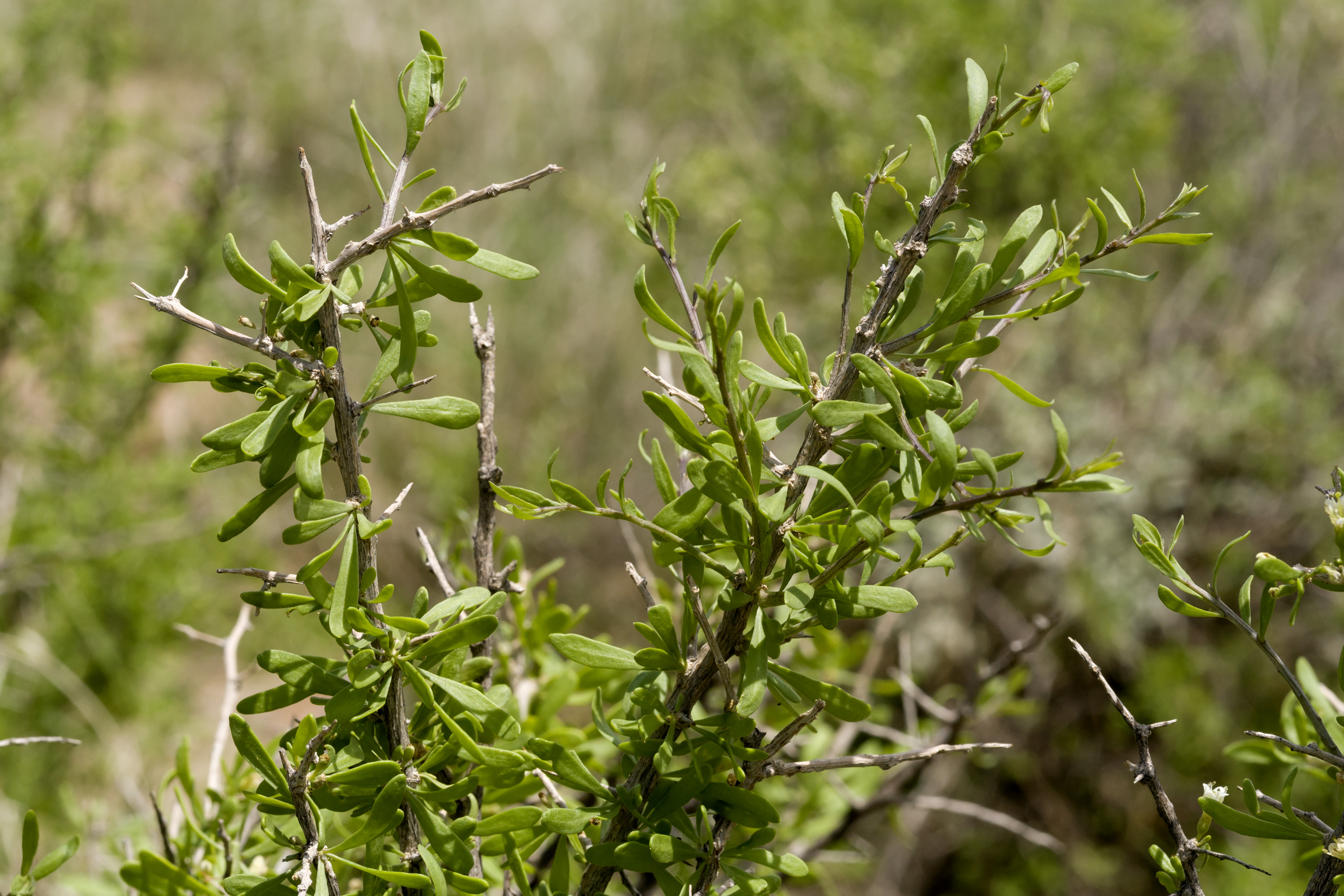

Conservation status
- Secure (NatureServe)

Scientific classification
- Kingdom: Plantae
- Clade: Embryophytes
- Clade: Tracheophytes
- Clade: Spermatophytes
- Clade: Angiosperms
- Clade: Eudicots
- Clade: Asterids
- Order: Solanales
- Family: Solanaceae
- Genus: Lycium
- Species: L. berlandieri

Binomial name
- Lycium berlandieri Dunal

= Lycium berlandieri =

Species of flowering plant

Lycium berlandieri is a species of flowering plant in the nightshade family known by the common name Berlandier's wolfberry. It is native to Mexico and the south-western United States from Arizona to Texas.

This shrub reaches up to 2 metres (6 ft 7 in) tall. The roots may extend 9 metres (30 ft) from the plant. It has spiny branches. It loses its leaves and becomes dormant during dry times. The bell-shaped flowers are solitary or borne in pairs. The fruit is a juicy red berry. This plant's life span is 90 years on average.

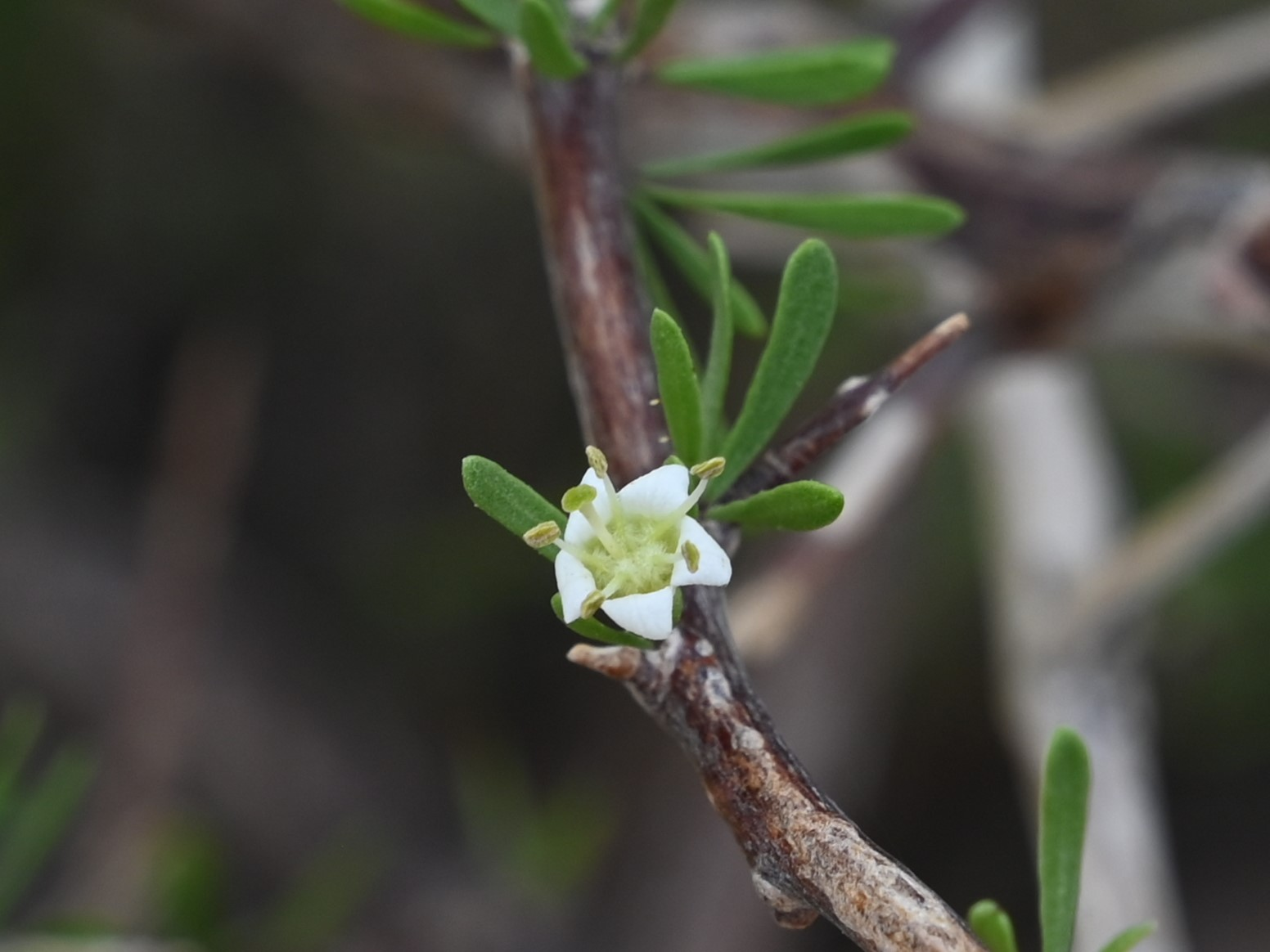
flower

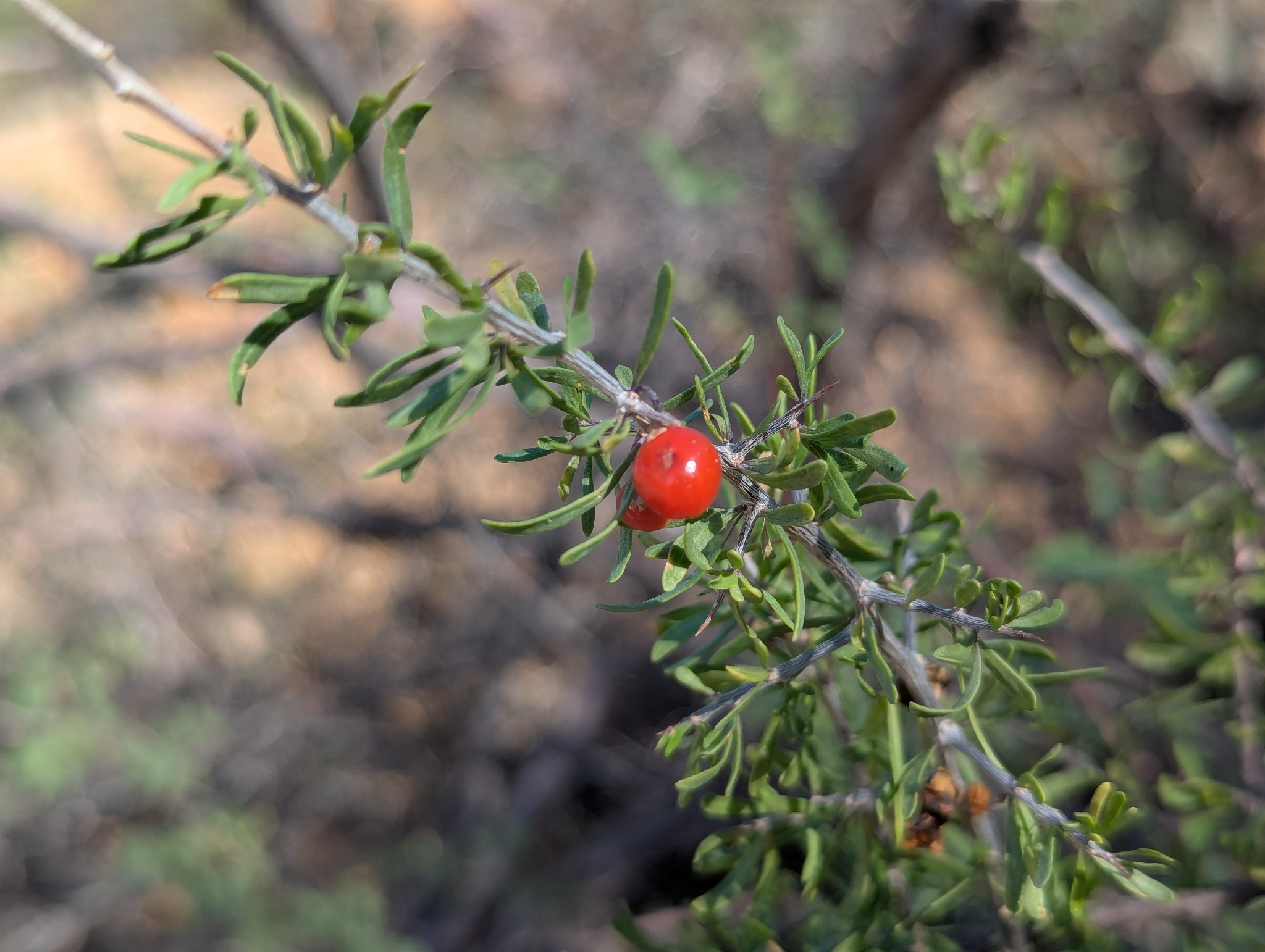
fruit

This plant is characteristic of the flora of the Sonoran and Chihuahuan Deserts. It is rarely dominant, but it occurs in many types of desert habitat, including mesquite and saltbush plant communities, creosote, grassland, prairie, and savanna. It can grow in desert salt flats and other saline habitats. It may invade grassland along with mesquite during the process of ecological succession. In the Sonoran and Chihuahuan Deserts it grows alongside ocotillo (Fouquieria splendens), saguaro (Carnegiea gigantea), range ratany (Krameria parvifolia), ironwood (Olneya tesota), jojoba (Simmondsia chinensis), false-mesquite (Calliandra eriophylla), brittlebush (Encelia farinosa), leatherstem (Jatropha cardiophylla), feather dalea (Dalea formosa), yucca, agave, Opuntia cacti, and acacia species. In Texas it can be found in sandy arroyos and more saline areas alongside mesquite and hackberry.

Many birds and rodents consume the fruits of the shrub. Gambel's quail live in habitat where the shrub is common, and they use it for cover and nesting.

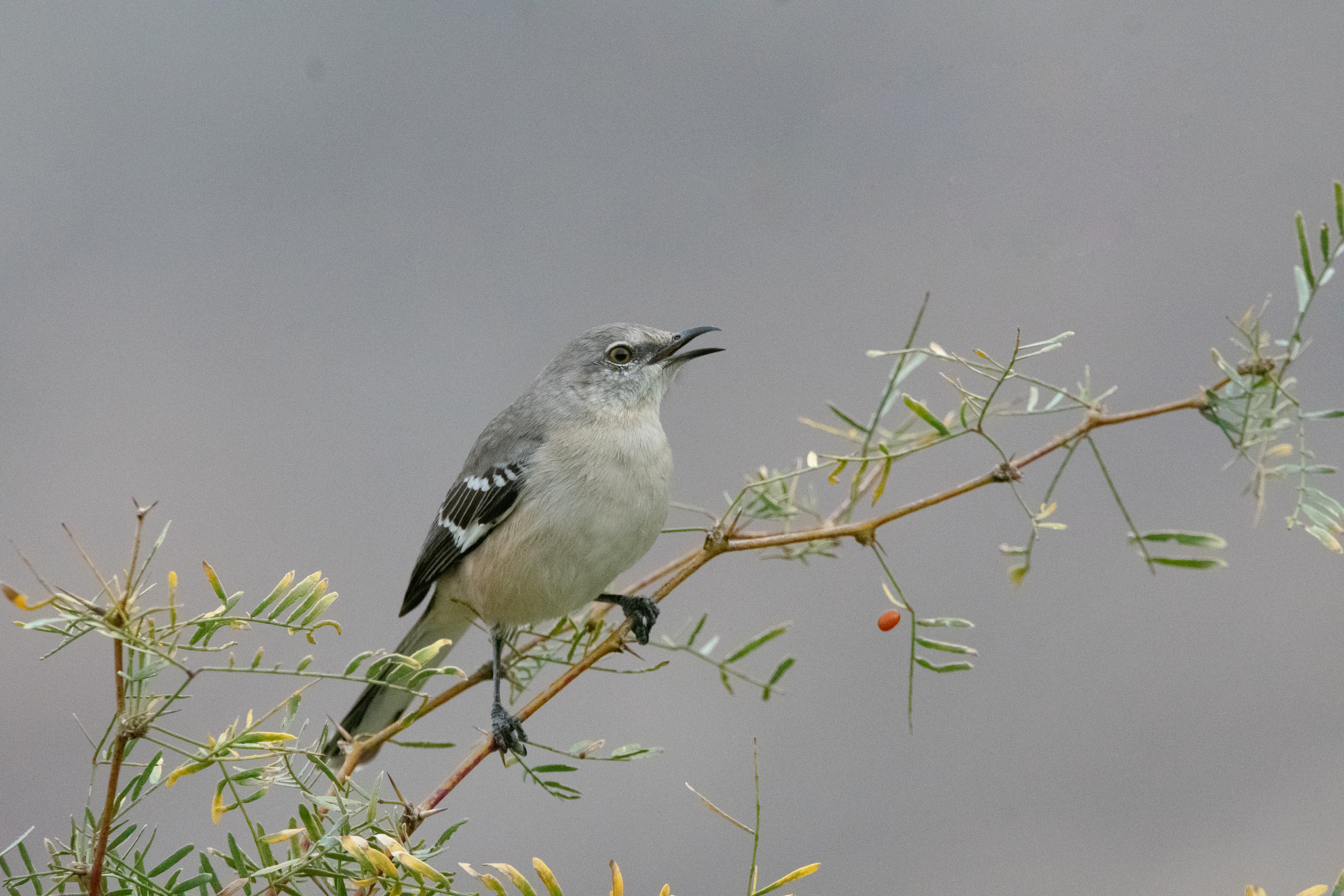
Northern mockingbird rejecting a wolfberry fruit, Palm Canyon, California. The berry, which is visible in midair, was not consumed."

Native Americans consumed the fruits and used the plant medicinally.
