= Microlechia =

Scientific classification
- Domain: Eukaryota
- Kingdom: Animalia
- Phylum: Arthropoda
- Class: Insecta
- Order: Lepidoptera
- Family: Gelechiidae
- Tribe: Gnorimoschemini
- Genus: Microlechia; Turati, 1924

Synonyms
- Hedma Dumont, 1932; Megalocypha Janse, 1960

Genus of moths

Microlechia is a genus of moths in the family Gelechiidae.

== Species ==
- Microlechia chretieni Turati, 1924
- Microlechia iranica (Povolný, 1976)
- Microlechia karsholti (Nupponen, 2010)
- Microlechia klimeschi (Povolný, 1972)
- Microlechia lycia (Li, 2001)
- Microlechia lyciella (Falkovitsh & Bidzilya, 2003)
- Microlechia maculata (Povolný, 1978)
- Microlechia melongenae (Povolný & Bradley, 1980)
- Microlechia rhamnifoliae (Amsel & Hering, 1931)
