= Microlechia klimeschi =

Scientific classification
- Kingdom: Animalia
- Phylum: Arthropoda
- Clade: Pancrustacea
- Class: Insecta
- Order: Lepidoptera
- Family: Gelechiidae
- Genus: Microlechia
- Species: M. klimeschi

Binomial name
- Microlechia klimeschi (Povolný, 1972)

Synonyms
- Megalocypha klimeschi Povolný, 1972

Species of moth

Microlechia klimeschi is a moth in the family Gelechiidae. It was described by Povolný in 1972. It is found on the Canary Islands.

The length of the forewings is 3.5–4 mm.

The larvae feed on Whitania aristata.
