= Microlechia karsholti =

Scientific classification
- Kingdom: Animalia
- Phylum: Arthropoda
- Clade: Pancrustacea
- Class: Insecta
- Order: Lepidoptera
- Family: Gelechiidae
- Genus: Microlechia
- Species: M. karsholti

Binomial name
- Microlechia karsholti (Nupponen, 2010)

Synonyms
- Hedma karsholti Nupponen, 2010

Species of moth

Microlechia karsholti is a moth of the family Gelechiidae. It is found in Russia (the southern Ural). The habitat consists of chalk steppe.

The wingspan is 8–9.5 mm. Adults are on wing in June.

== Etymology ==
The species is named in honour of Ole Karsholt.
