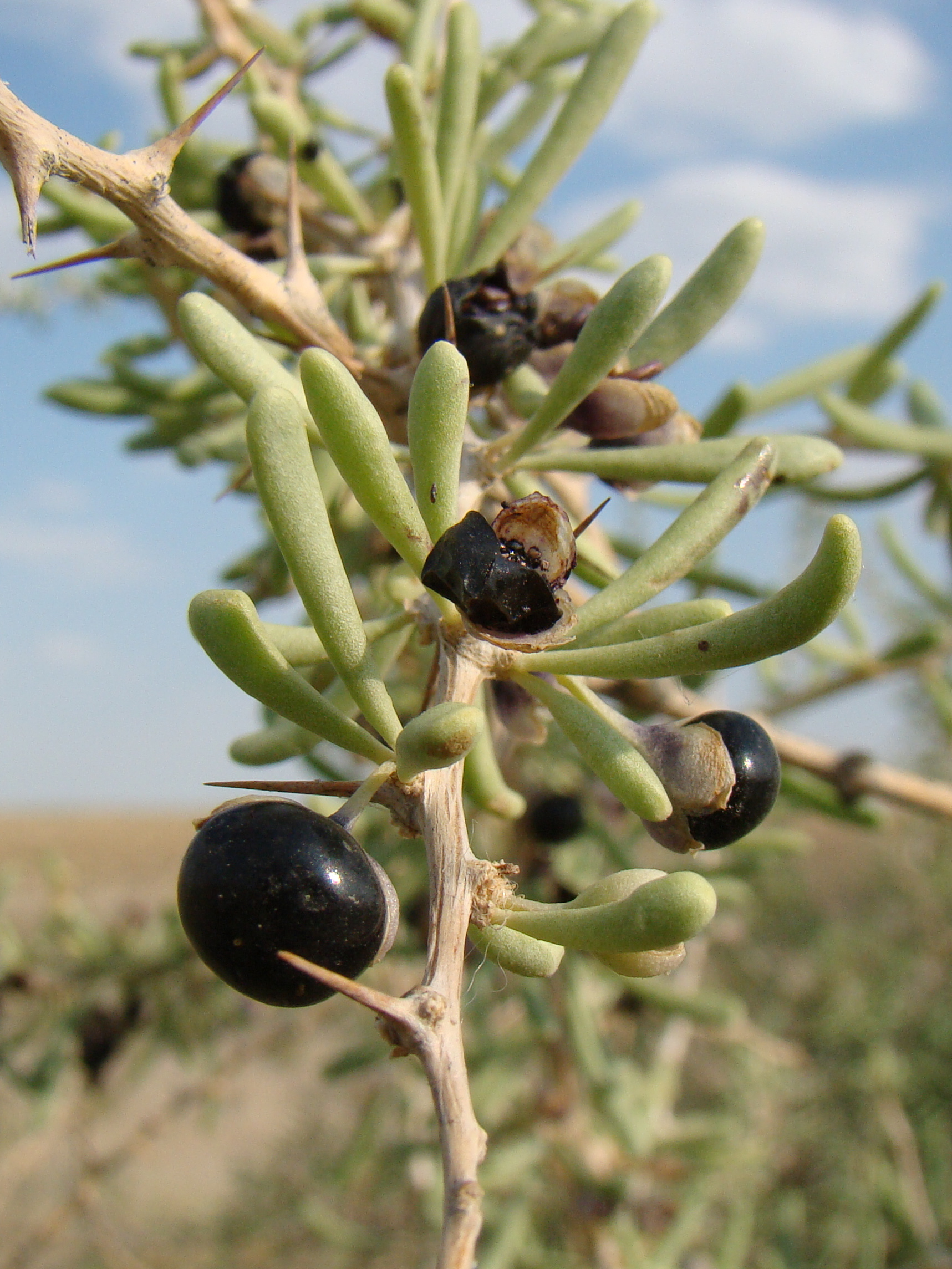
- Lycium ruthenicum fruits

Scientific classification
- Kingdom: Plantae
- Clade: Tracheophytes
- Clade: Angiosperms
- Clade: Eudicots
- Clade: Asterids
- Order: Solanales
- Family: Solanaceae
- Genus: Lycium
- Species: L. ruthenicum

Binomial name
- Lycium ruthenicum Murray

= Lycium ruthenicum =

Species of flowering plant

Lycium ruthenicum (Chinese: 黑果枸杞; pinyin: hei guo gou qi), is a flowering plant commonly known as Russian box thorn in the West. It is a species of flowering plant in the nightshade family which can be found in Central Asia, southern part of Russia, throughout Northwest China, Northern India and Pakistan. Also commonly known as black fruit wolfberry, siyah goji, black goji and kaokee.

== Description ==
The species is either 1.8 centimetres (0.71 in), 20–50 centimetres (7.9–19.7 in), 20–150 centimetres (7.9–59.1 in), or 180 centimetres (71 in) tall. The leaves are either 5–30 millimetres (0.20–1.18 in), 0.6–2.5 centimetres (0.24–0.98 in), or 6–25 millimetres (0.24–0.98 in) by 1–1.5 millimetres (0.039–0.059 in). It have 2-4 sepals each one of which is bell-shaped and 3–4 millimetres (0.12–0.16 in) long. Pedicels are either 5–10 millimetres (0.20–0.39 in) long or can be as long as it sepals. The calyx is 2.5–3.5 millimetres (0.098–0.138 in) long but can be companulate and exceed 4–5 millimetres (0.16–0.20 in). Corolla's tube is 5–7 millimetres (0.20–0.28 in) long with stamens have 5–8 millimetres (0.20–0.31 in) long berries (which can sometimes grow up to 9 millimetres (0.35 in)) which are also broad and globose. The fruits' seeds are brown coloured and are 1.5–2 millimetres (0.059–0.079 in) long. The flowering time is June to August but can sometimes bloom in May too. Fruits mature from August to October.

== Distribution and uses ==
In India, it grows in Nubra Valley where it is used by native people to cure blindness in camels. In Central Asia and Northwest China the species grows on elevation of 400–3,000 metres (1,300–9,800 ft) in saline deserts, sands and roadsides.
