= Microlechia iranica =

Scientific classification
- Kingdom: Animalia
- Phylum: Arthropoda
- Clade: Pancrustacea
- Class: Insecta
- Order: Lepidoptera
- Family: Gelechiidae
- Genus: Microlechia
- Species: M. iranica

Binomial name
- Microlechia iranica (Povolný, 1976)

Synonyms
- Megalocypha iranica Povolný, 1976

Species of moth

Microlechia iranica is a moth in the family Gelechiidae. It was described by Povolný in 1976. It is found in southern Iran.

The length of the forewings is 3.2-4.5 mm. The forewings are grey-whitish. The hindwings are dirty grey-whitish.
