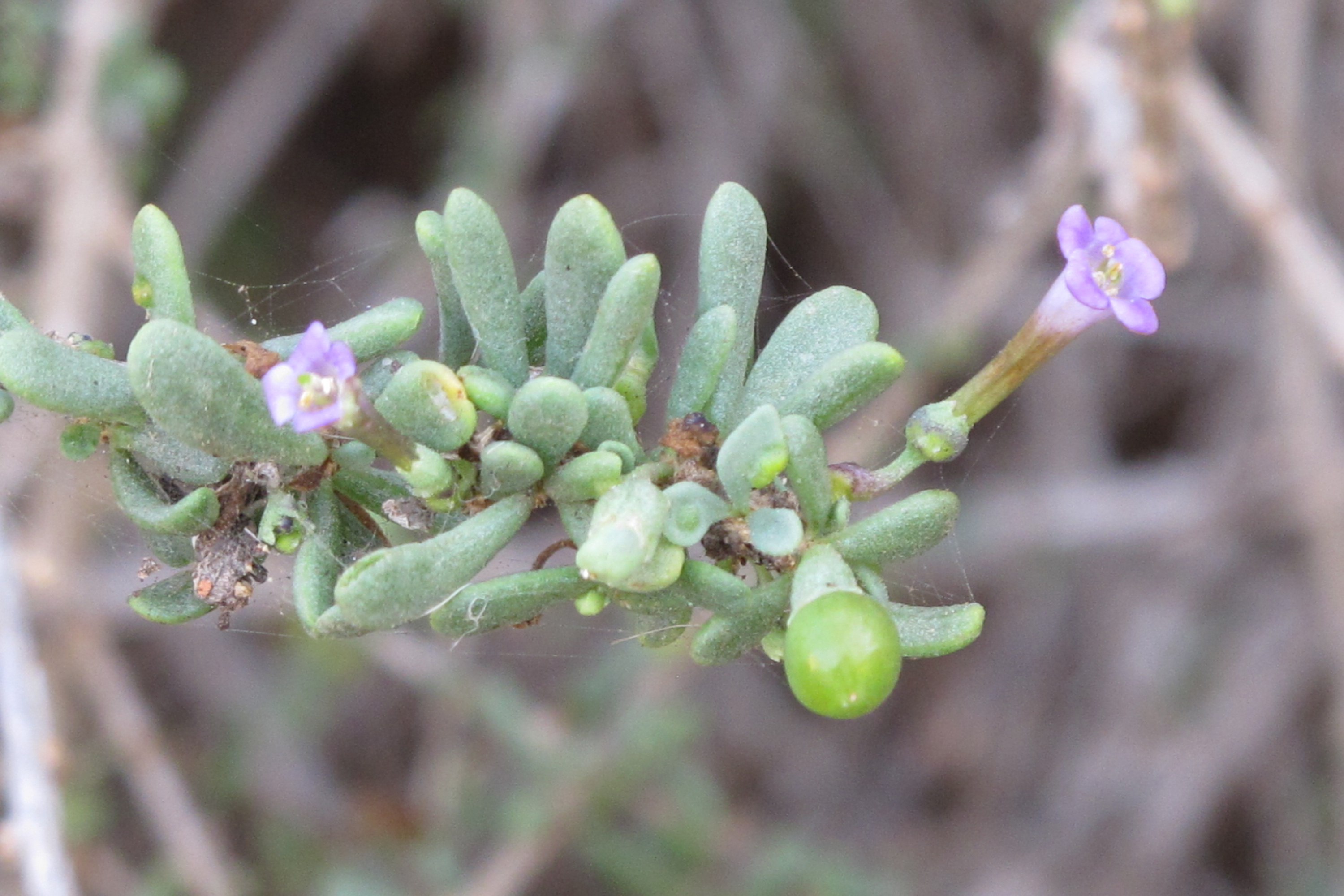

Scientific classification
- Kingdom: Plantae
- Clade: Tracheophytes
- Clade: Angiosperms
- Clade: Eudicots
- Clade: Asterids
- Order: Solanales
- Family: Solanaceae
- Genus: Lycium
- Species: L. intricatum

Binomial name
- Lycium intricatum Boiss.

Synonyms
- Lycium europaeum var. intricatum

= Lycium intricatum =

Species of plant

Lycium intricatum, the southern boxthorn, is a species of plant in the family Solanaceae (nightshades).

== Sources ==
This article incorporates text from a free content work. Licensed under CC0 (license statement/permission). Text taken from Lycium intricatum. Encyclopedia of Life.
