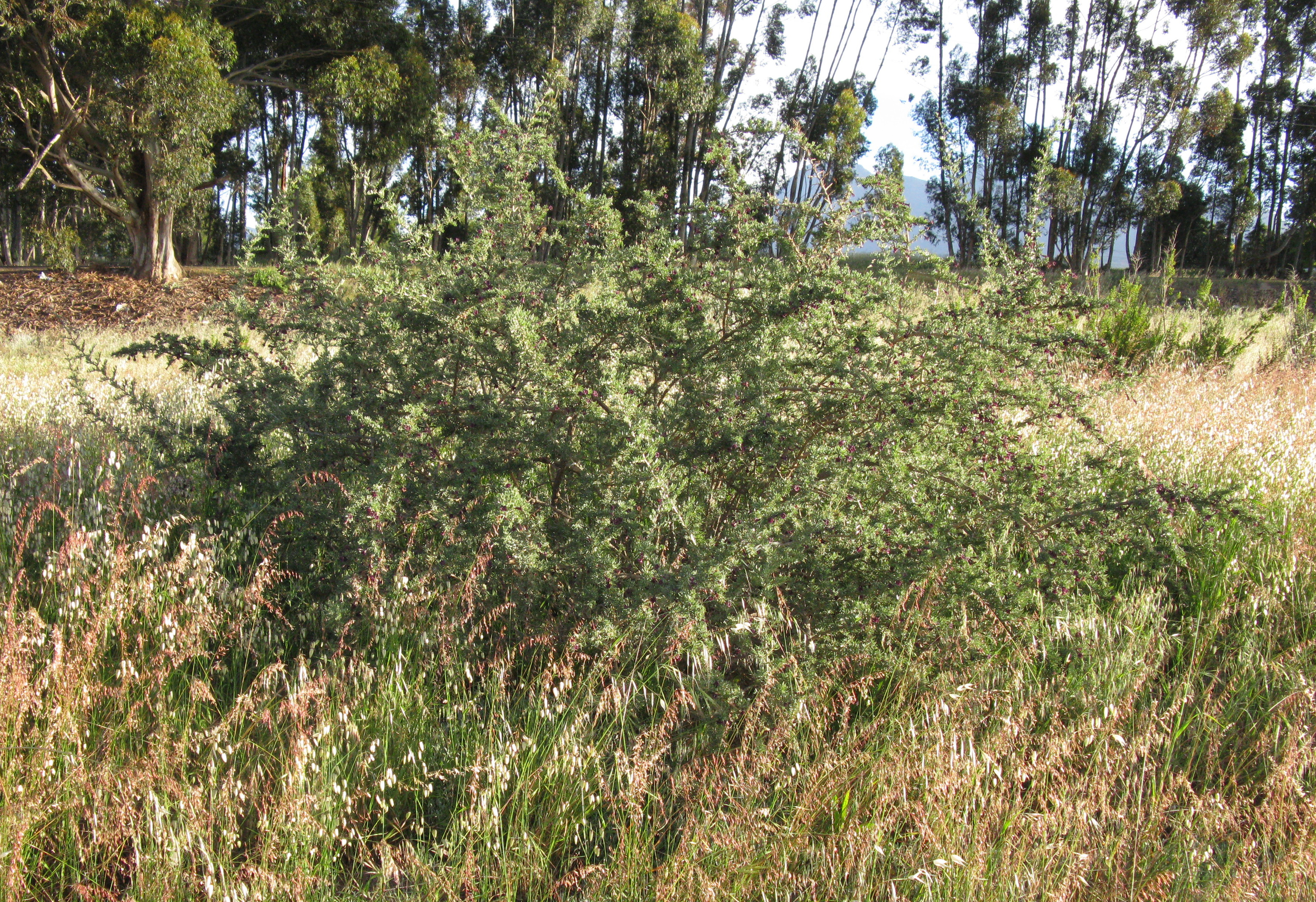
- L. afrum, the kraal honey thorn

Scientific classification
- Kingdom: Plantae
- Clade: Tracheophytes
- Clade: Angiosperms
- Clade: Eudicots
- Clade: Asterids
- Order: Solanales
- Family: Solanaceae
- Genus: Lycium
- Species: L. afrum

Binomial name
- Lycium afrum L.

= Lycium afrum =

Kraal honey thorn

Species of shrub

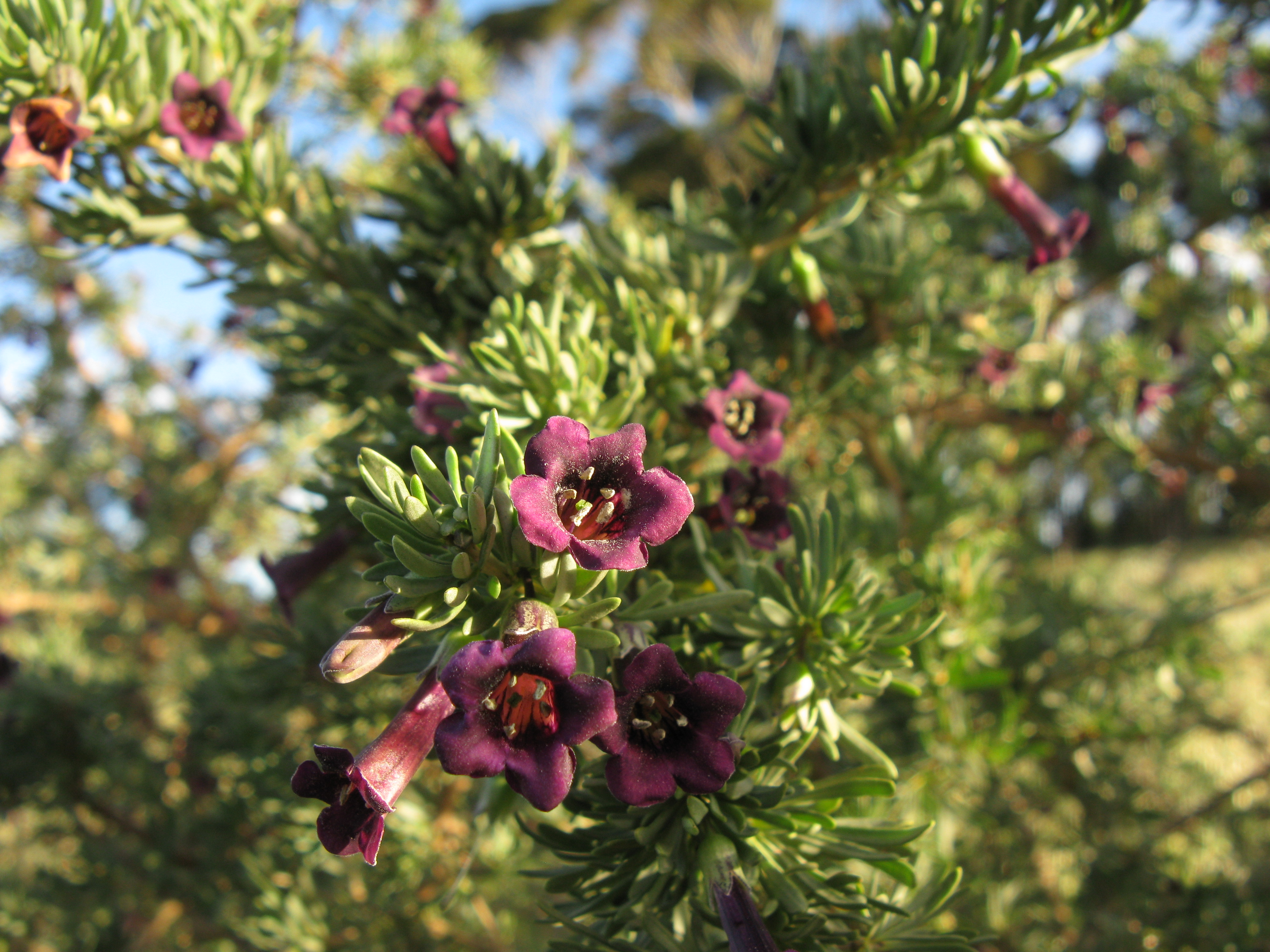
L. afrum, flowers and leaves

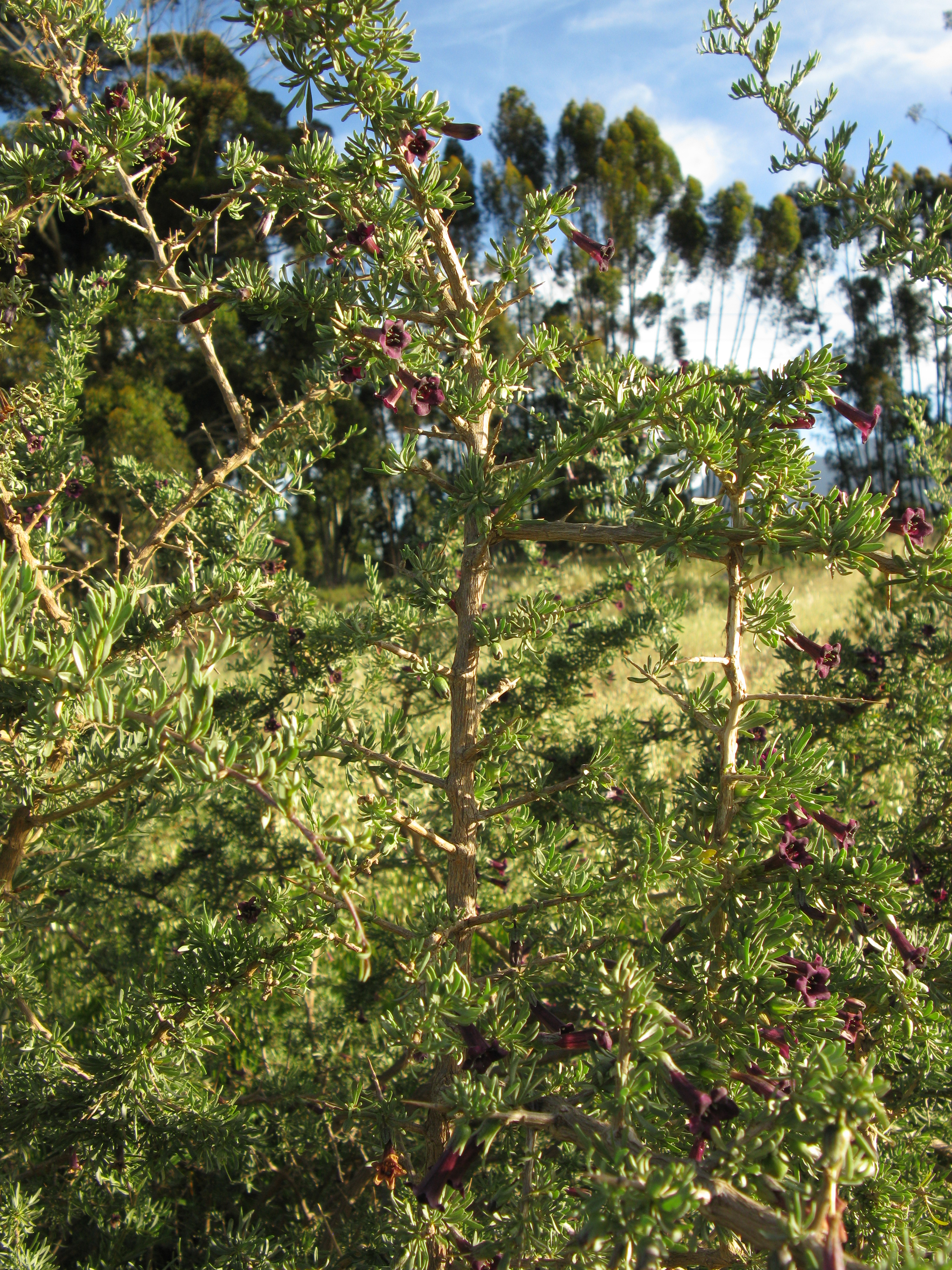
L. afrum, branch

Lycium afrum, the kraal honey thorn (Afrikaans: kraalkriedoring) is a shrub in the potato family (Solanaceae), indigenous to the Western Cape Province, South Africa.

== Distribution ==
The species is native to the far western limits of the Western Cape Province in South Africa. It occurs from Clanwilliam in the north, southwards to the Caledon area, and westwards into the Cape Peninsula.

It has appeared in Australia and is regarded with some concern as possibly invasive. Australian government factsheets remark that in Australia it is an uncommon hedge plant, sparingly naturalised in a few areas in Victoria.

== Description ==
Lycium afrum is a moderate-sized shrub that may grow as high as 3 metres (9.8 ft) and is formidably armed with straight, woody thorns.

Its leaves are leathery and tufted on short shoots.

It bears tubular purple flowers 12–20 millimetres (0.47–0.79 in) long, with flared petals about one quarter the length of the tube.

The fruit is a subspherical berry, very dark red when ripe, eaten by birds.

It is not clear how safe it is to eat the fruit, though berries of some species of Lycium certainly are eaten with impunity by humans and animals.
