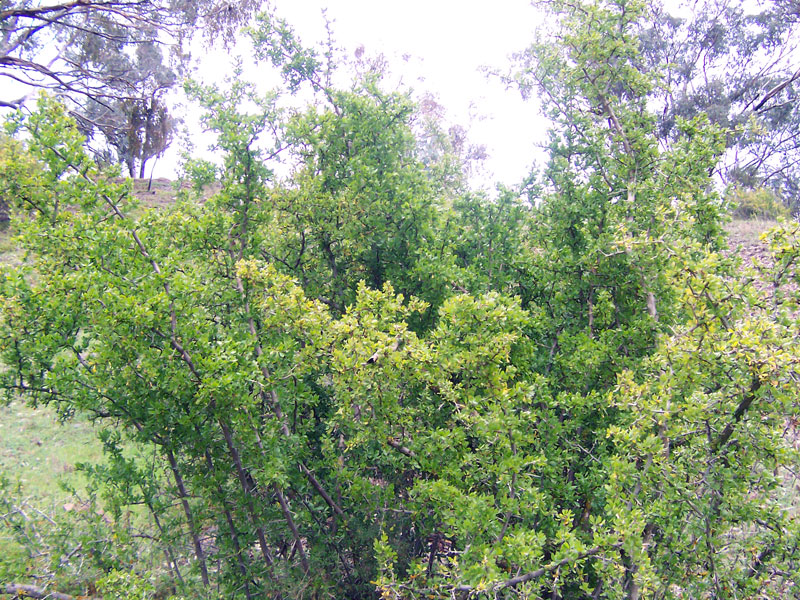
- African boxthorn (Lycium ferocissimum)

Scientific classification
- Kingdom: Plantae
- Clade: Embryophytes
- Clade: Tracheophytes
- Clade: Spermatophytes
- Clade: Angiosperms
- Clade: Eudicots
- Clade: Asterids
- Order: Solanales
- Family: Solanaceae
- Tribe: Lycieae
- Genus: Lycium; L. (1753)

Species
- 101; see text
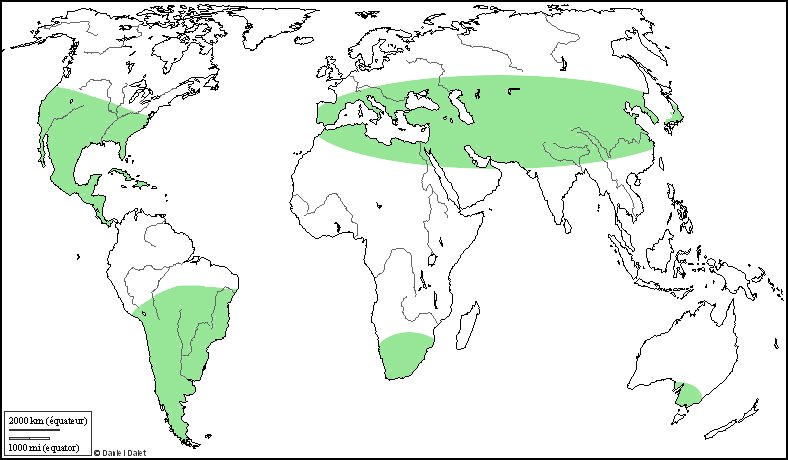

Synonyms
- Ascleia Raf. (1838); Cantalea Raf. (1838); Evoista Raf. (1838); Grabowskia Schltdl. (1832); Jasminoides Duhamel (1755); Oplukion Raf. (1838); Panzeria J.F.Gmel. (1791); Phrodus Miers (1849); Pukanthus Raf. (1838); Rhopalostigma Phil. (1860); Teremis Raf. (1838); Triliena Raf. (1838)

= Lycium =

Genus of flowering plants

Lycium is a genus of flowering plants in the nightshade family, Solanaceae. The genus has a disjunct distribution around the globe, with species occurring on most continents in temperate and subtropical regions. South America has the most species, followed by North America and southern Africa. There are several scattered across Europe and Asia, and one is native to Australia. Common English names for plants of this genus include box-thorn, wolfberry, and desert-thorn. Plants of the World Online currently accepts 101 species. Other estimates are of 70 to 80 species.

== Etymology ==
The generic name Lycium is derived from the Greek word λυκιον (lykion), which was applied by Pliny the Elder (23-79) and Pedanius Dioscorides (ca. 40–90) to a plant known as dyer's buckthorn. It was probably a Rhamnus species and was named for Lycia (Λυκία), the ancient southern Anatolian region in which it grew. The berry is called lycii fructus ("lycium fruit") in old Latin pharmacological texts.

== Description ==
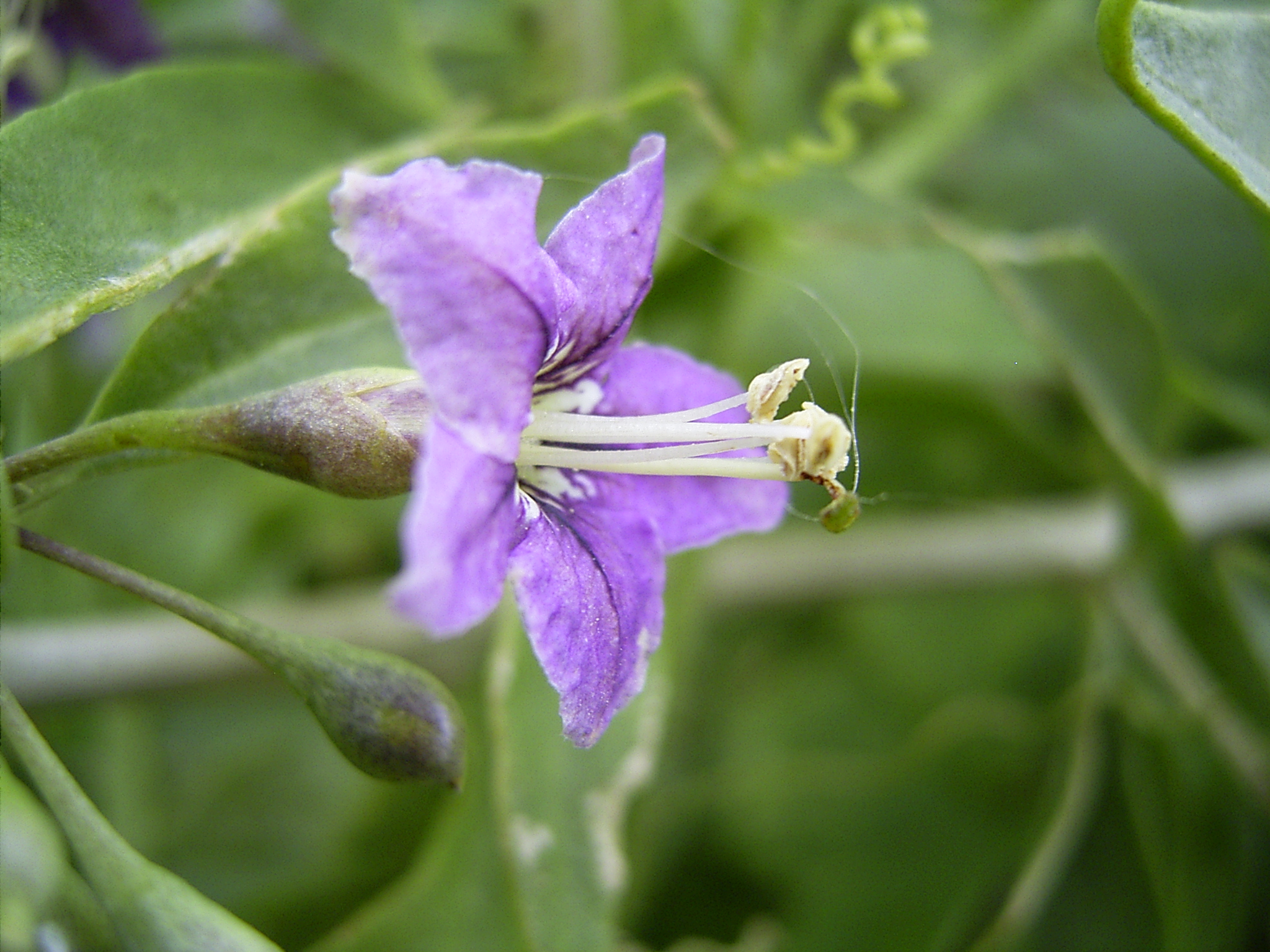
Lycium barbarum

Lycium are shrubs, often thorny, growing 1 to 4 meters tall. The leaves are small, narrow, and fleshy, and are alternately arranged, sometimes in fascicles. Flowers are solitary or borne in clusters. The funnel-shaped or bell-shaped corolla is white, green, or purple in color. The fruit is a two-chambered, usually fleshy and juicy berry which can be red, orange, yellow, or black. It may have few seeds or many. Most Lycium have fleshy, red berries with over 10 seeds, but a few American taxa have hard fruits with two seeds.

While most Lycium are monoecious, producing bisexual flowers with functional male and female parts, some species are gynodioecious, with some individuals bearing bisexual flowers and some producing functionally female flowers.

== Uses ==
Lycium has been known to European herbalists since ancient times, and species were traded from the Far East to Europe by the Romans, for example via Ariaca and the port of Barbarikon near today's Karachi, as mentioned in the Periplus of the Erythraean Sea. In his Naturalis historia, Pliny the Elder describes boxthorn as a medicinal plant, as does Pedanius Dioscorides in his P. Dioscoridae pharmacorum simplicium reique medicae.

In his 1753 publication Species Plantarum, Linnaeus describes three Lycium species: L. afrum, L. barbarum, and L. europaeum.

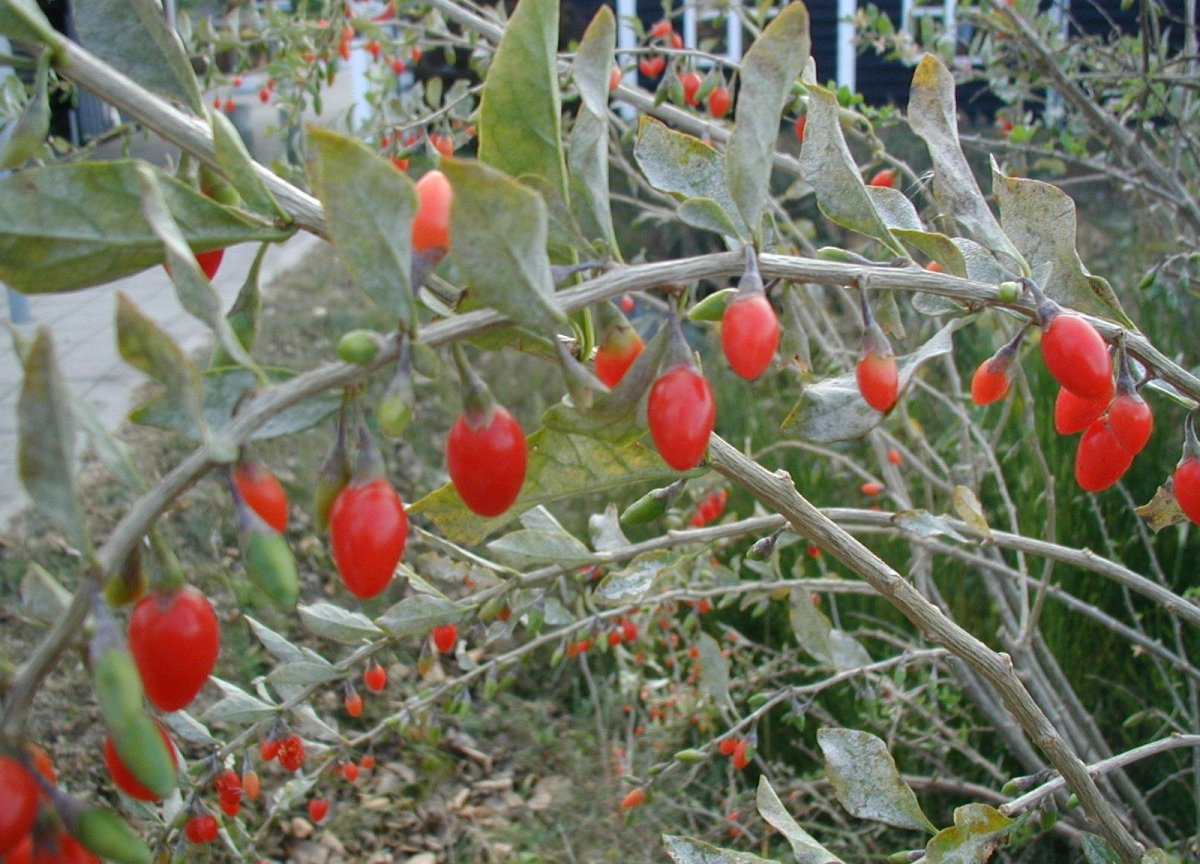
L. barbarum

Lycium, particularly L. barbarum, have long been used in traditional Chinese medicine. The leaves and roots of other species of Lycium, such as L. europaeum, when mixed with water, have been used in folk medicine. The fruit of L. barbarum and L. chinense, known as goji berry, is commonly consumed as a dried fruit. The Chinese tonic gou qi zi ("wolfberry fruit") is made of the fruit of any of several Lycium species, and is used as a dietary supplement.

== Ecology ==
Lycium species mostly occur in arid and semi-arid climates, and a few are known from coastal zones in somewhat saline habitat types.

Invasive species include L. ferocissimum, which was introduced to Australia and New Zealand and has become a dense, thorny pest plant there. It injures livestock, harbors pest mammals and insects, and displaces native species.

== Species ==
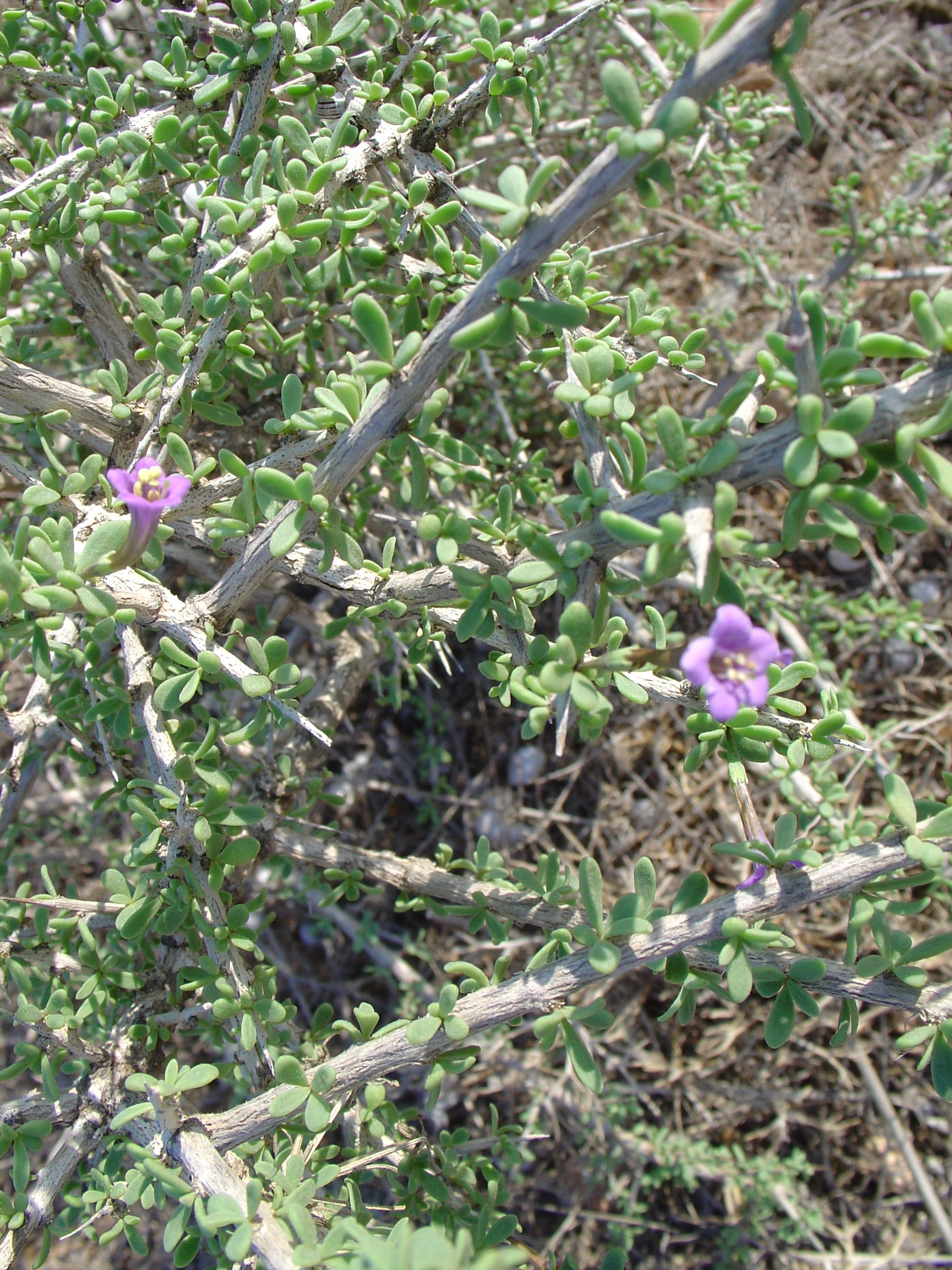
Lycium intricatum

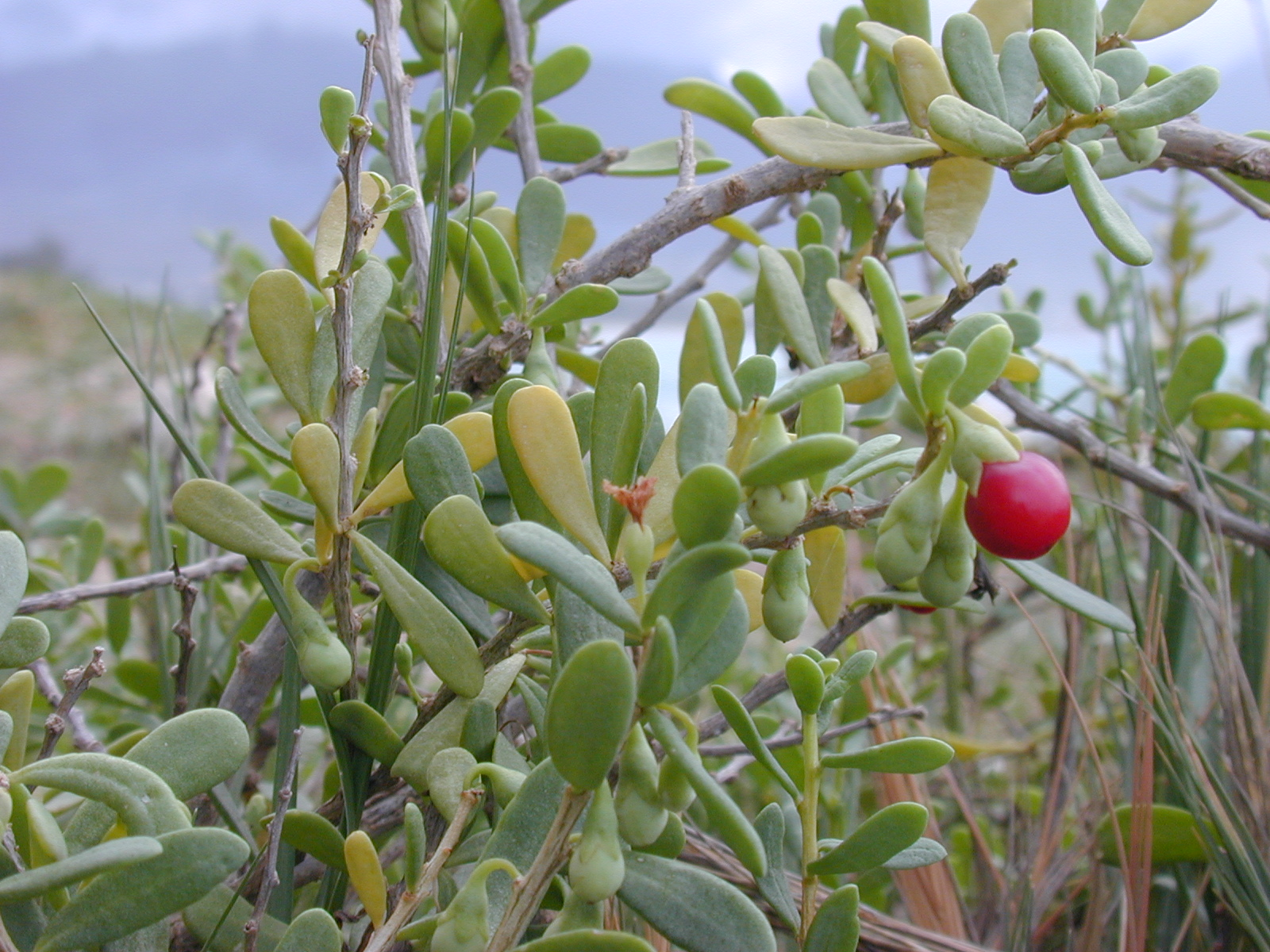
Lycium sandwicense

101 species are accepted.

- Lycium acutifolium E.Mey. ex Dunal
- Lycium afrum L. – Kraal honey thorn
- Lycium amarum Lu Q.Huang
- Lycium ameghinoi Speg.
- Lycium americanum Jacq.
- Lycium amoenum Dammer
- Lycium anatolicum A.Baytop & R.R.Mill
- Lycium andersonii A.Gray – Anderson boxthorn, water-jacket
- Lycium arenicola Miers
- Lycium armatum Griff.
- Lycium arochae F.Chiang, T.Wendt & E.J.Lott
- Lycium athium Bernardello
- Lycium australe F.Muell.
- Lycium barbarum L. – Barbary matrimony-vine, Chinese boxthorn, Duke of Argyll's teaplant, goji-berry, Himalayan goji, Tibetan goji
- Lycium barbinodum Miers
- Lycium berlandieri Dunal – Berlandier wolfberry
- Lycium boerhaviifolium L.f.
- Lycium bosciifolium Schinz
- Lycium brevipes Benth. – Baja desert-thorn
  - Lycium brevipes var. hassei (Greene) C.L.Hitchc. – Santa Catalina Island desert-thorn
- Lycium bridgesii (Miers) R.A.Levin, Jill S.Mill. & G.Bernardello
- Lycium californicum Nutt. ex A.Gray – California boxthorn, California desert-thorn
- Lycium carolinianum Walter – Carolina desert-thorn, Christmas berry
- Lycium cestroides Schltdl.
- Lycium chanar Phil.
- Lycium chilense Bertero
- Lycium chinense Mill. – Chinese teaplant, Chinese wolfberry, Chinese boxthorn
- Lycium ciliatum Schltdl.
- Lycium cinereum Thunb. – Kriedoring
- Lycium confertum Miers
- Lycium cooperi A.Gray – peachthorn, Cooper's wolfberry
- Lycium cuneatum Dammer
- Lycium cyathiforme C.L.Hitchc.
- Lycium cylindricum Kuang & A.M.Lu
- Lycium dasystemum Pojark.
- Lycium decumbens Welw. ex Hiern
- Lycium densifolium Wiggins
- Lycium depressum Stocks
- Lycium deserti Phil.
- Lycium distichum Meyen
- Lycium edgeworthii Dunal
- Lycium eenii S.Moore
- Lycium europaeum L. – European teatree, European matrimony-vine
- Lycium exsertum A.Gray – Arizona desert-thorn, littleleaf wolfberry
- Lycium ferocissimum Miers – African boxthorn
- Lycium flexicaule Pojark.
- Lycium fremontii A.Gray – Frémont's desert-thorn
- Lycium fuscum Miers
- Lycium gariepense A.M.Venter
- Lycium geniculatum Fernald
- Lycium gilliesianum Miers
- Lycium glomeratum Sendtn.
- Lycium grandicalyx Joubert & Venter
- Lycium hantamense A.M.Venter
- Lycium hirsutum Dunal
- Lycium horridum Thunb.
- Lycium humile Phil.
- Lycium infaustum Miers
- Lycium intricatum Boiss.
- Lycium isthmense F.Chiang
- Lycium kopetdaghi Pojark.
- Lycium leiospermum I.M.Johnst.
- Lycium leiostemum Wedd.
- Lycium macrodon A.Gray – desert wolfberry
- Lycium makranicum Schönb.-Tem.
- Lycium martii Sendtn.
- Lycium mascarenense A.M.Venter & A.J.Scott
- Lycium megacarpum Wiggins
- Lycium minimum C.L.Hitchc.
- Lycium minutifolium J.Rémy
- Lycium ningxiaense R.J.Wang & Q.Liao
- Lycium oxycarpum Dunal
- Lycium pallidum Miers – pale desert-thorn
- Lycium parishii A.Gray – Parish's desert-thorn
- Lycium petraeum Feinbrun
- Lycium pilifolium C.H.Wright
- Lycium puberulum A.Gray – downy desert-thorn
- Lycium pubitubum C.L.Hitchc.
- Lycium pumilum Dammer
- Lycium qingshuigeense Xu L.Jiang & J.N.Li
- Lycium rachidocladum Dunal
- Lycium repens Speg.
- Lycium ruthenicum Murray
- Lycium sandwicense A.Gray – ʻŌhelo kai, Hawaii desert-thorn
- Lycium schizocalyx C.H.Wright
- Lycium schreiteri F.A.Barkley
- Lycium schweinfurthii Dammer
- Lycium shawii Roem. & Schult. – Arabian boxthorn
- Lycium shockleyi A.Gray – Shockley's desert-thorn
- Lycium sokotranum R.Wagner & Vierh.
- Lycium stenophyllum J.Rémy
- Lycium strandveldense A.M.Venter
- Lycium tenue Willd.
- Lycium tenuispinosum Miers
- Lycium tetrandrum Thunb.
- Lycium texanum Correll – Texas wolfberry
- Lycium torreyi A.Gray – Torrey's boxthorn, squawthorn
- Lycium truncatum Y.C.Wang
- Lycium villosum Schinz
- Lycium vimineum Miers
- Lycium yunnanense Kuang & A.M.Lu

=== Formerly placed here ===
- Buchozia japonica (Thunb.) Callm. (as L. foetidum L.f. or L. japonicum Thunb.)
