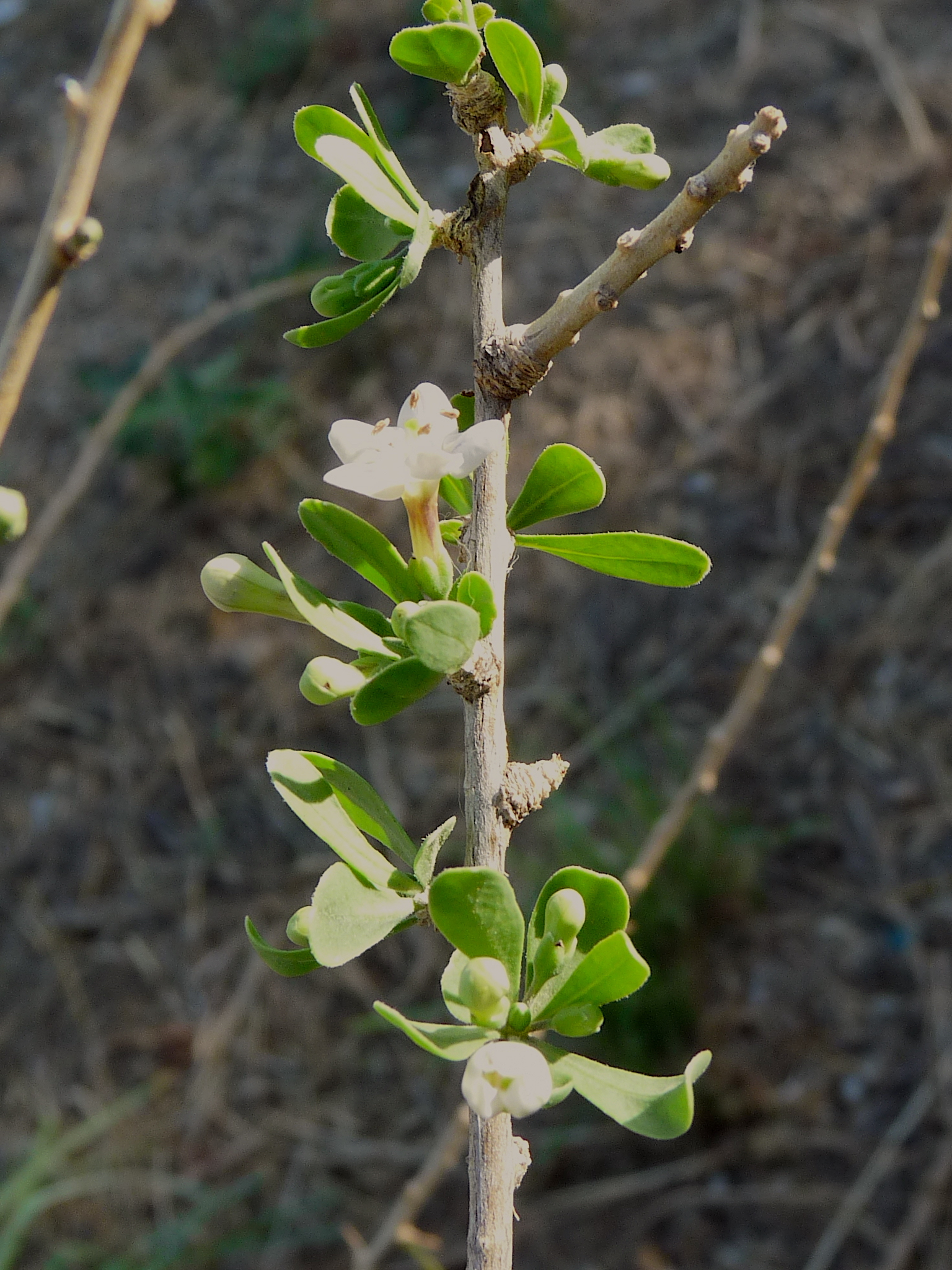
- Flower and leaves

Scientific classification
- Kingdom: Plantae
- Clade: Tracheophytes
- Clade: Angiosperms
- Clade: Eudicots
- Clade: Asterids
- Order: Solanales
- Family: Solanaceae
- Genus: Lycium
- Species: L. europaeum

Binomial name
- Lycium europaeum L.

Synonyms
- List: Lycium dumosum Salisb.; Lycium macrocarpum Lavallée; Lycium mediterraneum Dunal; Lycium obliquifolium Stokes; Lycium orientale Miers; Lycium saevum Miers; Lycium salicifolium Mill.; Lycium siculum Ucria; Lycium spina-christi Sennen & Elías; Lycium spinosum Hasselq.

= Lycium europaeum =

Species of flowering plant

Lycium europaeum, the European tea tree, European box‑thorn, or European matrimony‑vine, is a species of flowering plant in the family Solanaceae. It is native to the entire Mediterranean region, and has been introduced to the Canary Islands, Madeira, and the Balearic Islands. Its fruit is edible.
