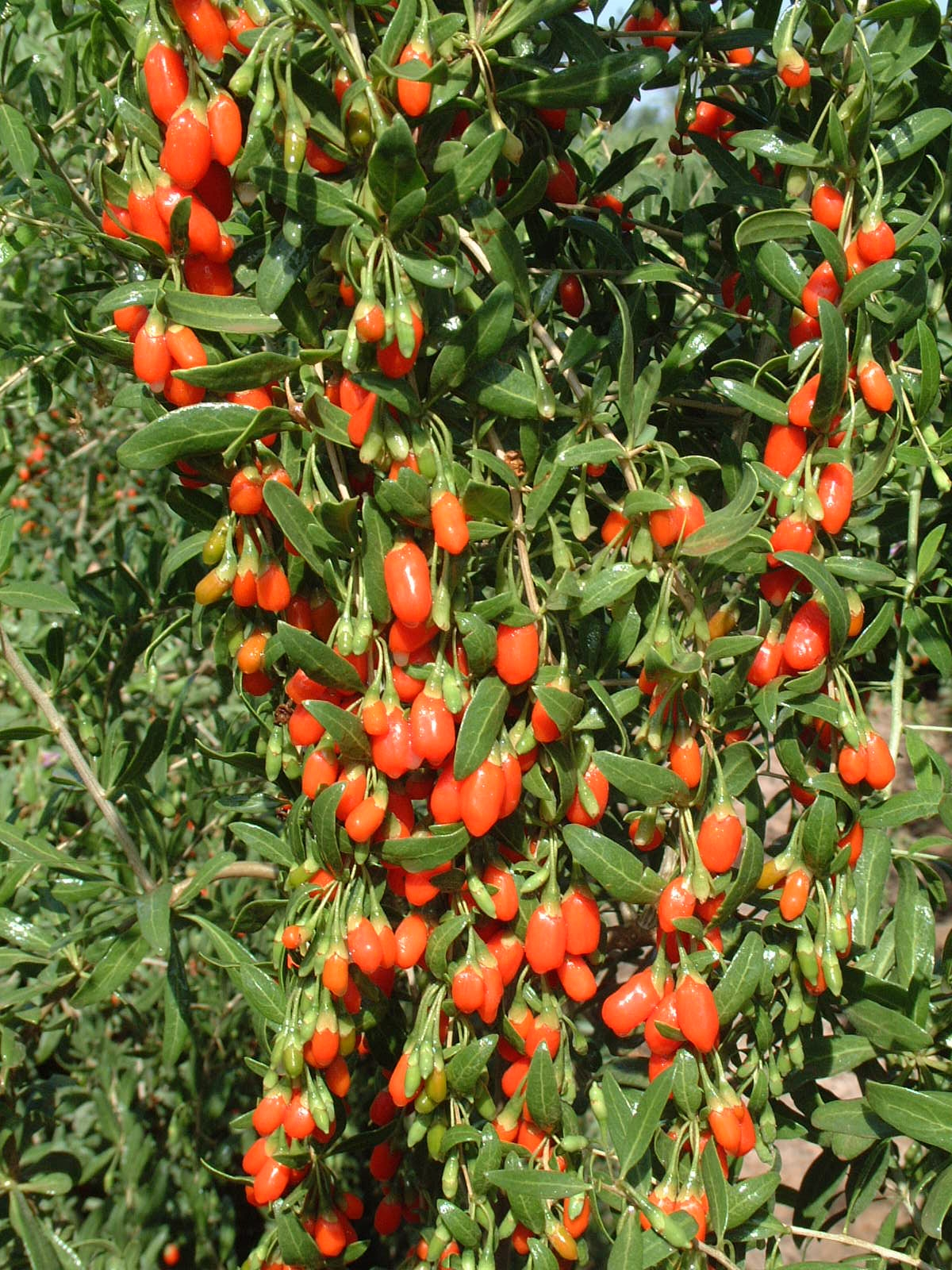
- Lycium barbarum with ripe berries

Scientific classification
- Kingdom: Plantae
- Clade: Tracheophytes
- Clade: Angiosperms
- Clade: Eudicots
- Clade: Asterids
- Order: Solanales
- Family: Solanaceae
- Genus: Lycium
- Species: L. barbarum

Binomial name
- Lycium barbarum L.

Synonyms
- Boberella halimifolia (Mill.) E.H.L.Krause; Jasminoides flaccidum Moench; Lycium halimifolium Mill.; Lycium turbinatum Veill.; Lycium vulgare Dunal; Teremis elliptica Raf.

= Lycium barbarum =

Species of flowering plant

Lycium barbarum is a shrub native to China, with present-day range across Asia and southeast Europe. It is one of two species of boxthorn in the family Solanaceae from which the goji berry or wolfberry is harvested, the other being Lycium chinense.

Common names of the plant in English include Chinese wolfberry, barbary matrimony vine, red medlar or matrimony vine. In the United Kingdom it is also known as Duke of Argyll's tea tree after Archibald Campbell, 3rd Duke of Argyll who introduced it in the country in the 1730s.

The shrub is an important commercial crop in northern China, especially in the Ningxia Hui Autonomous Region. Its Chinese name is Ningxia gǒuqǐ.

== Description ==
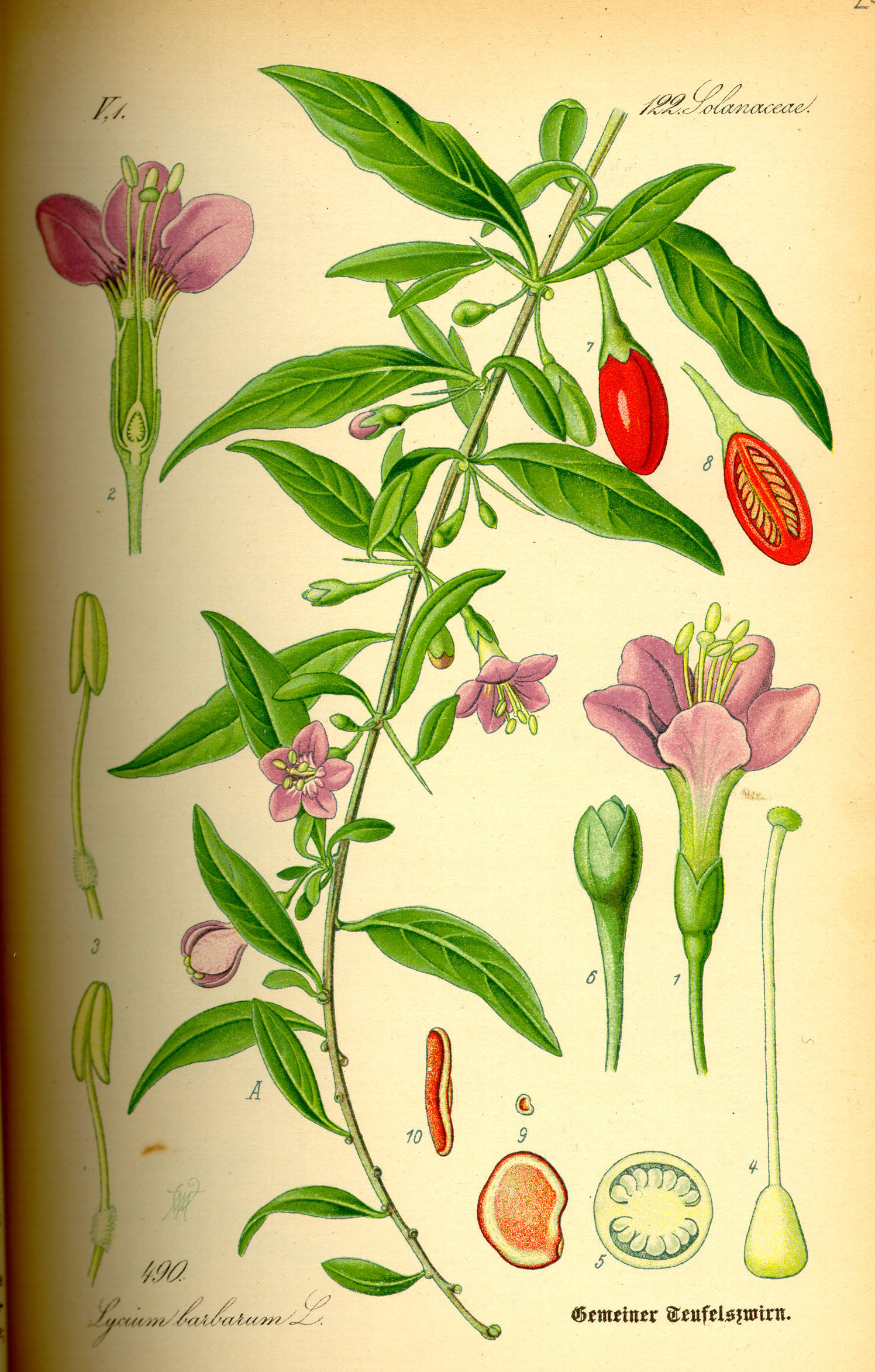
Lycium barbarum illustration from Flora von Deutschland, Österreich und der Schweiz, by Prof. Dr. Otto Wilhelm Thomé, 1885, Gera, Germany.

Lycium barbarum is a deciduous woody shrub that typically grows to a height of 1–3 metres (3 ft 3 in – 9 ft 10 in). It is characterised by its weak arching branches, and the side branches are often reduced to short leafless spines.

=== Leaves and flowers ===
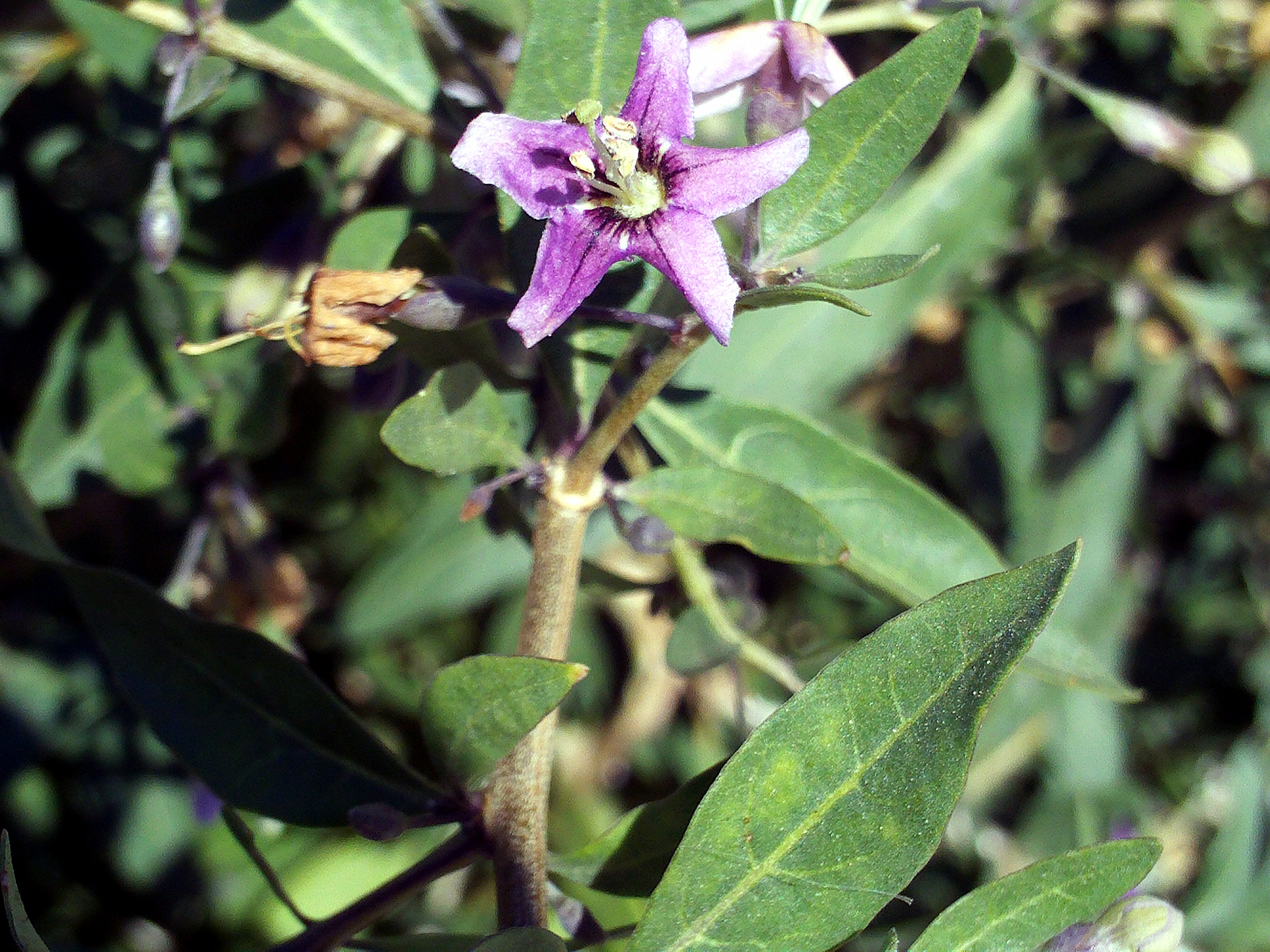
L. barbarum leaves and flower

L. barbarum leaves form on the shoot either in an alternating arrangement, or in bundles of up to three. Each leaf is green, scarcely fleshy when fresh, usually lanceolate (spearhead-shaped), sometimes with rounded tips. Clustered leaves are up to 25 mm long; the single alternate leaves are up to 55 mm long.

The flowers grow in groups of one to three in the leaf axils, with pedicels 6–15 mm long. The calyx, eventually ruptured by the growing berry, is a whitish tube crowned by five or six radial triangular sepals, shorter than the tube, 10–12 mm long and 3–4 mm wide, sometimes 2–lipped, strongly curved. The sepals are whitish on the lower side (facing towards the branch) and deep mauve on the top side. Each flower has five stamens, exserted for 3–8 mm, with stalks longer than the anthers. The pistil is 8–11.5 mm long. The anthers are longitudinally dehiscent.

=== Fruit ===
The fruit of L. barbarum, the main variety of goji berry, is a bright orange-red, ellipsoid berry 1–2 cm (0.39–0.79 in) in diameter. The fruiting calyx is split deeply once or twice. The number of seeds in each berry varies widely based on cultivar and fruit size, ranging from 10 to 60. The seeds are about 2 mm long, 1 mm wide, yellowish, compressed with a curved embryo.

=== Reproduction ===
The plants are self-pollinating, but may be cross pollinated by insects. The species is dispersed into natural areas by birds and other animals that eat its fruit.

In the Northern Hemisphere, flowering occurs from June through September and berry maturation from August to October, depending on the latitude, altitude, and climate. Where frost does not occur fruiting is continuous and plants do not lose their leaves.

== Occurrence and cultivation ==
=== China ===
Lycium barbarum has been cultivated in China, along the fertile aggradational floodplains of the Yellow River, for more than 600 years. It is still extensively cultivated in the Ningxia Hui Autonomous Region of north-central China, centered in Zhongning County, totaling 200,000 acres as of 2005, The region produced 13,000 tons of fruit in 2001, accounting for 42% of the nation's total production of goji berries. The plant is also cultivated in the Xinjiang Uyghur Autonomous Region of western China,

The berries of L. barbarum are the only therapeutic grade ("superior-grade") kinds of wolfberries used by practitioners of traditional Chinese medicine.

As Ningxia's borders merge with three deserts, L. barbarum is also planted to control erosion and reclaim irrigable soils from desertification.

=== United Kingdom ===
Lycium barbarum has been used since the 18th century in the United Kingdom for hedging, especially in coastal districts. Its red berries are attractive to a wide variety of British birds.

The plant continues to grow wild in UK hedgerows. On 15 January 2003, the Department for Environment, Food and Rural Affairs launched a project to improve the regulations protecting traditional countryside hedgerows, and specifically mentioned Duke of Argyll's Tea Tree as one of the species to be found growing in hedges located in Suffolk Sandlings, Hadleigh, Bawdsey, near Ipswich, and Walberswick.

Importation of mature Lycium barbarum plants into the United Kingdom from most countries outside Europe is illegal, due to the possibility they could be vectors of diseases attacking Solanaceae crops, such as potato or tomato.

=== Australia ===
Lycium barbarum introduced to Australia became naturalised in south-eastern coastal and sub-coastal regions, and is regarded as an environmental weed in the states of Victoria and Tasmania. It is often found growing in disturbed sites, native bushland, and riverbanks, often forming dense thickets along the latter. It overlaps and is often confused with Lycium ferocissimum, a similar but spinier species originating from Africa.

== Chemistry ==
Phytochemicals present in the fruit, root, and other parts of the plants have been studied in some detail.

The main compounds in the fruit (23% of the dry mass) are polysaccharides and proteoglycans. Carotenoid pigments are the second major group, chiefly zeaxanthin dipalmitate. Other detected compounds include flavonoids derived from myricetin, quercetin, and kaempferol; hexadecanoic acid, linoleic acid, and myristic acid. Other compounds include β-sitosterol, scopoletin, and p-coumaric acid. The alkaloid atropine, common in plants of the family Solanaceae, is not detectable.

The compounds present in the roots have been less studied, but they include betaine, choline, linoleic acid, and β-sitosterol [79]. Of particular interest are cyclic oligopeptides with 8 aminoacid rings.

The leaves are known to contain the flavonoids quercetin 3-O-rutinoside-7-O-glucoside, kaempferol 3-O-rutinoside-7-O-glucoside, rutin, isoquercitrin, quercetin, kaempferol damascenone, choline, scopoletin, vanillic acid, salicylic acid, and nicotinic acid. From the flowers, diosgenin, β-sitosterol, and lanosterol have been isolated.

== See also ==
- Goji
- Gouqi jiu
- List of culinary fruits
- List of dried foods
