= Lycium cinereum =

Scientific classification
- Kingdom: Plantae
- Clade: Tracheophytes
- Clade: Angiosperms
- Clade: Eudicots
- Clade: Asterids
- Order: Solanales
- Family: Solanaceae
- Genus: Lycium
- Species: L. cinereum

Binomial name
- Lycium cinereum Thunb.

Species of shrub

Lycium cinereum is a shrub in the nightshade family (Solanaceae) indigenous to southern Africa. It is widespread across South Africa, as well as southern Namibia and Botswana.

== Description ==
Lycium cinereum is a small, stiff, very spiny shrub. It has rigidly erect-spreading, intricately branching stems. The young stems are grey-white with striations, while the older stems become dark glossy brown.

Like many other Lycium species, the leaves are oblong to narrowly-elliptic in shape.

The flowers emerge from the leaf axils. The corolla is tubular, with five large reflexed lobes (petals). The stamens are extended and very clearly exserted from the corolla mouth. The calyx is tubular-to-campanulate, with its length and width being almost equal. The calyx is relatively short, and covers less than half of the corolla tube.

The fruits are small, ovoid, red berries.

=== Related species ===
Lycium cinereum is frequently confused with several related species that co-occur with it in South Africa, including Lycium ferocissimum, Lycium horridum, Lycium pumilum, and Lycium tenue.

- It can be distinguished from Lycium ferocissimum by its narrower leaves and its calyx that is less than half the length of the corolla (The calyx of Lycium ferocissimum is at least two thirds the length of the corolla, covering most of it).
- It can be distinguished from Lycium horridum by its stamens that are all very clearly exserted from its corolla tube (Only some of the stamens of Lycium horridum are slightly exserted).
- It can be distinguished from Lycium pumilum by its calyx that is less than half the length of the corolla (The calyx of Lycium pumilum, like that of Lycium ferocissimum, is at least two thirds the length of the corolla, covering most of it).

Some earlier authors treated several of these species names as synonymous with L. cinereum.
