= Busby =

Busby may refer to:

== Places ==
- Busby, Alberta, a hamlet in Canada

=== Australia ===
- Busby, New South Wales, a suburb of Sydney
- Busby Islet in South Australia
  - Busby Islet Conservation Park

=== United Kingdom ===
- Busby, East Renfrewshire, a village in Scotland
  - Busby F.C., an association football club from Busby
- Busby Hall, a country house in North Yorkshire, England
- Great Busby, a village in North Yorkshire, England
- Little Busby, a civil parish in North Yorkshire, England

=== United States ===
- Busby, Arkansas, an unincorporated community
- Busby, Kansas, an unincorporated community
- Busby, Montana, a census-designated place

== Other ==
- Busby (given name)
- Busby (surname)
- Busby Babes, the group of Manchester United football players
- Busby Marou, Australian musical duo
  - Busby Marou (album) by the duo
- Allison & Busby, a publishing house based in London
- Busby quintuplets (born 2015), the first set of all-female quintuplets born in the United States
- Busby (military headdress), a kind of military headdress, made of fur, derived from that traditionally worn by Hussars.

== See also ==
- Busby Railway, a railway to the south of Glasgow, Scotland
- Bubsy, a series of video games
- Busbee (1976–2019), American songwriter
- Busbie, Scotland
- Bushby, a village in Leicestershire, England
- Buzby, a talking cartoon bird, part of a marketing campaign by UK Post Office Telecommunications
