= Busby Islet =

Island in South Australia

- Location within South Australia

Geography
- Location: Nepean Bay
- Coordinates: 35°37′27″S 137°38′26″E
- Area: 10 ha (25 acres)
- Highest elevation: 1 m (3 ft)

Administration
- Australia

Demographics
- Population: 0

Busby Islet (also known as Bushy Island and Anchorage Island) is an islet in the Australian state of South Australia located in Nepean Bay on the north coast of Kangaroo Island about 2 kilometres (1.2 miles) north of the municipal seat of Kingscote. The islet and adjoining areas are notable as habitat for bird life. The islet has enjoyed protected area status since 1909 and since at least 1972, have been part of the Busby Islet Conservation Park.

== Description ==
Busby Islet is an islet located in Nepean Bay about 2 kilometres (1.2 miles) east of Kingscote on Kangaroo Island in South Australia. Busby Islet along with the Beatrice Islets are three high points on the southern edge of a spit that is exposed at low water. The spit which is named ‘The Spit’ extends from Cape Rouge about 5 kilometres (3.1 miles) north of Kingscote in a south easterly direction across the opening of the Bay of Shoals for a distance of about 5 nautical miles (9.3 kilometres; 5.8 miles). Busby Islet covers an area of about 10 hectares (25 acres) and as of 1996 had a maximum elevation of one metre (3.3 ft).

== Formation, geology and oceanography ==
The conditions for the creation of The Spit and therefore Busby Islet and the Beatrice Islets became possible about 7500 years ago when sea levels reached current levels. The islet is composed of sand and sandgrit, which has formed into 'low dunes' at the islet's summit. The islet is part of a drying spit at low water which falls to a depth of 5 m (16 ft) within about 0.25 km (0.16 mi) to the south.

== Flora and fauna ==
=== Flora ===
As of 1996, Busby Islet was reported as supporting a ‘low shrubland of highly salt-tolerant succulents such as grey samphire, glassworts and austral seablite’ while the summit of the island supports ‘marginally less salt tolerant nitre bush and African boxthorn.’

=== Fauna ===
Sources dated 1987 and 1996 suggest that bird species are the dominant fauna. As of 1980 and 1981, the following bird species were observed on Busby Islet: Australian pelican, black-faced shag, little pied cormorant, little black cormorant, pied cormorant, white-faced heron, sacred ibis, chestnut teal, black swan, brown falcon, grey plover, pied oystercatcher, sooty oystercatcher, ruddy turnstone, silver gull, pacific gull, caspian tern, fairy tern, crested tern, sharp-tailed sandpiper, red-necked stint, curlew sandpiper, eastern curlew, whimbrel, greenshank, rock parrot, raven and little grassbird.

==== Little penguins ====
Historically, little penguins could be found in burrows in the vicinity of Busby Islet and its adjacent sandbanks. The species was not listed in the bird list published in the management plan for the Busby Islet Conservation Park, which was collated during surveys in 1980 and 1981. As of 2011, this colony is believed to be extinct.

== History ==
=== European discovery and use ===
Busby Islet is reported as being originally named by Matthew Flinders as Bushy Island. However, it is reported that a possible spelling error has resulted in Busby Island being the official name since at least 1869. The name Anchorage Island has also been used for the islet. The name Bushy Island is still used on British Admiralty charts and within American sources. Busby Islet is one of the island sites from which guano was mined under licence from the South Australian Government prior to 1919.

== Protected areas status ==
Busby Islet first received protected area status on 13 May 1909 under the Birds Protection Act 1900. The islets were subsequently proclaimed as a fauna reserve under the Fauna Conservation Act 1964, dedicated again in 1967 ‘for the conservation of wildlife habitat’ and then as a conservation park under the National Parks and Wildlife Act 1972 in 1972. 16 March 1967 As of 2012, the waters adjoining the islet is within a sanctuary zone within the Encounter Marine Park. Accordingly, as of October 2014, the islet has been a 'no entry' area as part of the marine park's regulatory regime. Busby Islet is also part of a larger area that includes the extent of The Spit within Nepean Bay including the Beatrice Islets and which was included in a non-statutory listing of nationally important wetlands located in South Australia as part of A Directory of Important Wetlands in Australia.

== See also ==
- List of islands of Australia

== Citations and references ==
=== References ===
- South Australia. Department of Marine and Harbors (DMH) (1985), The Waters of South Australia a series of charts, sailing notes and coastal photographs, Dept. of Marine and Harbors, South Australia, ISBN 978-0-7243-7603-2
- National Parks and Wildlife Service (NPWS) (1987). Conservation Parks of Kangaroo Island Management Plan (PDF). National Parks and Wildlife Service, Department of Environment and Planning, South Australia. ISBN 0-7243-8983-0.
- Robinson, A. C.; Canty, P.; Mooney, T.; Rudduck, P. (1996). South Australia's offshore islands (PDF). Australian Heritage Commission. ISBN 978-0-644-35011-2.
- Robinson, A. C.; Armstrong, D. M., eds. (1999). A biological survey of Kangaroo Island South Australia in November 1989 and 1990 (PDF). Adelaide, SA: Heritage and Biodiversity Section, Department for Environment, Heritage and Aboriginal Affairs, South Australia. ISBN 978-0-7308-5862-1.
- "Australian Wetlands Database - Directory Wetland Information Sheet: Busby and Beatrice Islets - SA023". Commonwealth of Australia (C of A), Department of the Environment. 1995.
- Eyles, Kathy; Larmour, Geoff; Young, Sarah; Australia. Environment Australia; Natural Heritage Trust (Australia). National Wetlands Program (2001), A Directory of important wetlands in Australia (PDF) (3rd ed.), Environment Australia, ISBN 978-0-642-54721-7
- Hydrographic Department, Ministry of Defence (MOD) (1983). Gulf of St Vincent and approaches (chart no. 1762). (reproduced by the Royal Australian Navy Hydrographic Service).
- Wiebkin, Annelise (2011), Conservation management priorities for little penguin populations in Gulf St Vincent. Report to Adelaide and Mount Lofty Ranges Natural Resources Management BoardSARDI Publication No. F2011/000188-1. SARDI Research Report Series No.588 (PDF), South Australian Research and Development Institute (Aquatic Sciences)
