= Channel Point Coastal Reserve =

- IUCN category V (protected landscape/seascape)
- Location within Northern Territory
- Location: Northern Territory
- Nearest city: Darwin
- Coordinates: 13°09′51″S 130°07′00″E
- Area: 2.50 km^{2} (0.97 sq mi)
- Established: 2005
- Governing body: Parks and Wildlife Commission of the Northern Territory
- Website: www.parksandwildlife.nt.gov.au/parks/find/channelpoint#.VRYDsvmUeAU

Channel Point Coastal Reserve is a protected area in the Northern Territory of Australia.

It is situated approximately 240 kilometres (149 mi) south west of Darwin opposite the Peron Islands and between the mouth of the Daly River and Channel Point. The reserve overlaps with the Anson Bay, Daly and Reynolds River Floodplains, an Important Bird and Biodiversity Area.

Facilities in the area include a boat ramp, camping area and a small internal road to the boat ramp. The infrastructure development was commenced in 2006 and completed shortly afterward. It is adjacent to the Aboriginal community of Bulgul and the private residential area known as Channel Point Community.

The area contains habitat for many species of birds including royal spoonbills, magpie geese, plumed whistling-duck, grey teal and glossy ibis.

== Climate ==
Climate data for Channel Point, elevation 3 m (9.8 ft), (1994–2020 normals, extremes 1994–present)
Month	Jan	Feb	Mar	Apr	May	Jun	Jul	Aug	Sep	Oct	Nov	Dec	Year
Record high °C (°F)	35.0 (95.0)	35.0 (95.0)	35.0 (95.0)	35.5 (95.9)	35.2 (95.4)	34.1 (93.4)	34.7 (94.5)	36.0 (96.8)	38.0 (100.4)	37.7 (99.9)	38.5 (101.3)	35.7 (96.3)	38.5 (101.3)
Mean daily maximum °C (°F)	31.7 (89.1)	31.6 (88.9)	32.0 (89.6)	32.5 (90.5)	31.2 (88.2)	29.3 (84.7)	29.3 (84.7)	29.6 (85.3)	31.1 (88.0)	32.3 (90.1)	32.9 (91.2)	32.3 (90.1)	31.3 (88.4)
Mean daily minimum °C (°F)	25.1 (77.2)	25.2 (77.4)	24.8 (76.6)	23.5 (74.3)	20.7 (69.3)	17.7 (63.9)	17.1 (62.8)	18.2 (64.8)	21.6 (70.9)	24.1 (75.4)	25.0 (77.0)	25.1 (77.2)	22.3 (72.2)
Record low °C (°F)	18.0 (64.4)	20.3 (68.5)	18.4 (65.1)	15.5 (59.9)	13.5 (56.3)	9.9 (49.8)	10.0 (50.0)	10.9 (51.6)	14.0 (57.2)	17.7 (63.9)	19.8 (67.6)	20.6 (69.1)	9.9 (49.8)
Average rainfall mm (inches)	457.6 (18.02)	385.5 (15.18)	331.5 (13.05)	104.2 (4.10)	13.4 (0.53)	0.8 (0.03)	0.1 (0.00)	3.6 (0.14)	11.3 (0.44)	71.0 (2.80)	125.8 (4.95)	314.3 (12.37)	1,819.1 (71.61)
Average rainy days (≥ 1.0 mm)	18.2	16.6	15.2	6.5	1.2	0.1	0.0	0.3	1.3	4.8	8.6	14.9	87.7
Source: Australian Bureau of Meteorology

== See also ==
Protected areas of the Northern Territory
