= Busbee (surname) =

Busbee is a surname. Notable people with the surname include:

- George Busbee (1927–2004), American politician
- Juliana Royster Busbee, American artist
- Matthew Busbee, American swimmer
- Perrin Busbee, coach of the North Carolina State college football program (1892–1897)
- Shirlee Busbee (born 1941), American novelist
- Jay Busbee, American novelist/journalist
- busbee (1976–2019), American songwriter

== See also ==
- Busby (disambiguation)
