= Anson Bay, Daly and Reynolds River Floodplains =

Coordinates: 13°27′51″S 130°20′23″E

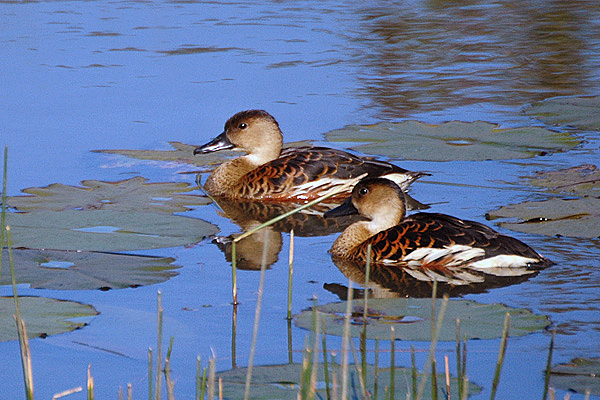
The floodplains are important for wandering whistling ducks

The Anson Bay, Daly and Reynolds River Floodplains comprise some 2,656 square kilometres (1,025 sq mi) of seasonally inundated floodplains around Anson Bay, and the lower reaches of the Daly, Reynolds and Docherty Rivers entering the bay, on the west coast of the Top End of the Northern Territory of Australia. Anson's Bay lies about 120 kilometres (75 mi) south-west of Darwin, on the eastern side of the Joseph Bonaparte Gulf, opening on to the Timor Sea. The site is important for large numbers, and a wide variety, of waterbirds.

== Birds ==
The floodplains have been identified as an Important Bird Area (IBA) by BirdLife International because they support large numbers of magpie geese, wandering whistling ducks, pied herons and intermediate egrets. The adjacent intertidal mudflats of Anson Bay support up to 27,000 waders, or shorebirds, probably including over 1% of the world population of great knots. The site several large waterbird nesting colonies; other birds that breed in relatively large numbers include little black, little pied and pied cormorants, darters, Australian white ibises, royal spoonbills, Australian pelicans, great, intermediate and cattle egrets, pied herons and nankeen night herons. The IBA also supports bush stone-curlews, varied lorikeets, rainbow pittas, white-gaped and bar-breasted honeyeaters, silver-crowned friarbirds and canary white-eyes. The Peron Islands at the northern end of the bay seasonally support up to 15,000 white-winged terns.
