= Peron Islands =

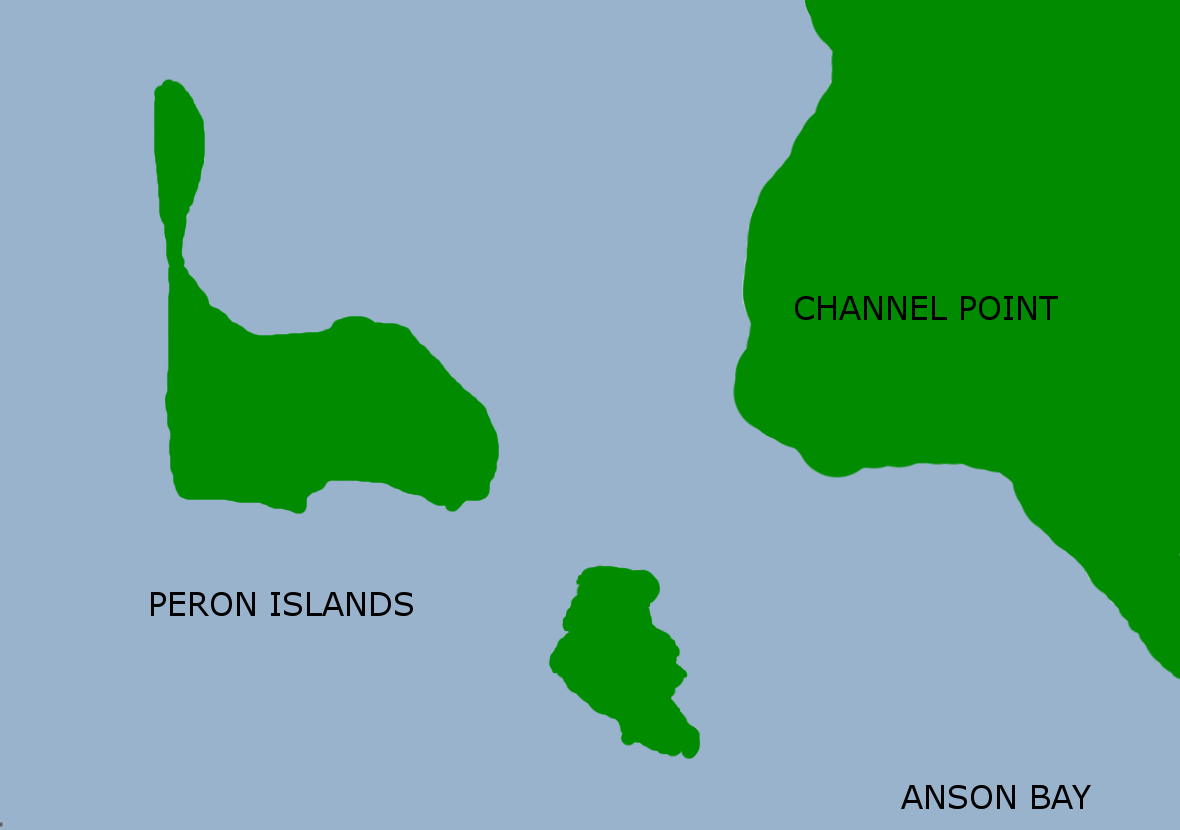
- Basic map of the Peron Islands

- Location within Northern Territory
- Etymology: François Péron

Geography
- Coordinates: 13°11′33″S 130°03′04″E
- Total islands: 2

Administration
- Australia
- Territory: Northern Territory
- Locality: Rakula

The Peron Islands are two low-lying islands off the west coast of the Northern Territory of Australia. They are about 5 km off Channel Point. Channel Point forms the northern end of Anson Bay which includes the mouth of the Daly River.

The smaller South Peron Island lies about 3 km to the southeast of the more dominant North Peron Island. The two are separated by a very shallow channel that is well exposed during a spring low tide. The northern narrow tip of the north island has the distinguishing feature of a relatively tall round hill that can be seen from as far north as Point Blaze at the southern end of Fog Bay, or approximately 20 kilometres away on a clear day. The islands are uninhabited and the nearest population is the small community of Bulgul on the mainland adjacent to the North Island. There is also a private residential area Channel Point Community adjacent to the south island.

The Peron Islands along with the adjacent land and waters (to the low tide water mark) surrounding the Peron Islands and the community of Bulgul are part of the Delissaville Wagait Larrakia Aboriginal land trust. Under the Aboriginal Land Rights Act 1976 access to the islands is prohibited without a permit, applications are lodged through the Northern Land Council. Camping is not permitted on the islands.

Since 2007, the Peron Islands have been located within the boundaries of the locality of Rakula.

== History ==
The islands are named after François Péron, a naturalist on the Baudin expedition to Australia. During World War II, the RAAF established a radar station on North Peron Island, to enable detection and interception of incoming Japanese aircraft.

== Environment ==
North Peron Island contains a breeding colony of Australian pelicans that is possibly of national significance. The islands are part of the Anson Bay, Daly and Reynolds River Floodplains Important Bird Area (IBA), identified as such by BirdLife International because of its importance for large numbers of waterbirds.
