= Beatrice Islet Conservation Park =

Island in Australia

- IUCN category Ia (strict nature reserve)
- Location within South Australia
- Location: South Australia
- Nearest city: Kingscote
- Coordinates: 35°38′23″S 137°40′46″E
- Area: 1.03 km^{2} (0.40 sq mi)
- Established: 16 March 1967
- Governing body: Department for Environment and Water

Beatrice Islet Conservation Park is a protected area occupying the Beatrice Islets and adjoining intertidal areas in Nepean Bay on Kangaroo Island, South Australia. It is located about 4 kilometres (2.5 miles) east of the town of Kingscote.

It was dedicated in 1967 for "conservation of wildlife habitat" replacing previous statutory protection dating back to 1909. A management philosophy for the conservation park published in 1987 supports the use of the park as a "feeding and roosting habitat for waterbirds". The conservation park which is about 103 ha (250 acres) in size, occupies part of a sandspit extending from Cape Rouge to the immediate north of Kingscote. The Beatrice Islets which originally supported bushes of African boxthorn which, when cleared in either the 1960s or the 1970s, resulted in erosion and destabilisation of both islets to the extent that both were described as being "a mudflat/cocklebed" which is submerged at high water.

The conservation park is classified as an IUCN Category Ia protected area.
