= Beatrice Islets =

Pair of islets in South Australia

- Location within South Australia

Geography
- Location: Nepean Bay
- Coordinates: 35°38′26″S 137°40′55″E
- Area: 10 ha (25 acres)
- Highest elevation: 0 m (0 ft)

Administration
- Australia

Demographics
- Population: 0

Beatrice Islets are pair of islets in the Australian state of South Australia located in Nepean Bay on the north coast of Kangaroo Island about 4 kilometres (2.5 miles) east of Kingscote. The islets and adjoining intertidal areas are notable as habitat for bird life. The islet pair has enjoyed protected area status since 1909 and since at least 1972, have been part of the Beatrice Islet Conservation Park. During either the 1960s or the 1970s, the islets were extensively damaged by an exercise to remove an infestation of South African boxthorn.

== Description ==
Beatrice Islets are pair of islets located in Nepean Bay about 4 kilometres (2.5 miles) east of Kingscote on Kangaroo Island in South Australia. The Beatrice Islets along with Busby Islet are three high points on the southern edge of a spit that is exposed at low water. The spit which is named ‘The Spit’ extends from Cape Rouge about 5 kilometres (3.1 miles) north of Kingscote in a south easterly direction across the opening of the Bay of Shoals for a distance of about 5 nautical miles (9.3 kilometres; 5.8 miles). The islets which are separated by a distance of about 1.25 kilometres (0.78 miles), have a north-south alignment. The islets historically consisted of sand dunes that were permanently above high water. However, an exercise to remove South African boxthorn, an introduced species considered to an infestation risk, which occurred either during the 1960s or the 1970s and which resulted in the islets becoming ‘susceptible to erosion, and tides and rough weather’ thereby reducing the ‘once stable vegetated islets to bare, wave-washed sand spits’. Subsequent attempts to stabilise the islets and encourage the deposition of sand were unsuccessful. As of 1987, the islets were reported as existing "only as a mudflat and cocklebed which emerges above the sea at low tide."

== Formation, geology and oceanography ==
The conditions for the creation of The Spit and therefore Beatrice Islets and Busby Islet became possible about 7500 years ago when sea levels reached current levels. The islets are composed of sand and sand grit. The islets is part of a drying spit at low water which falls to a depth of 5 m (16 ft) within about 0.6–1.25 km (0.37–0.78 mi) to the west.

== Flora and fauna ==
=== Flora ===
As of 1987 and again in 1996, the Beatrice Islets were reported as having no vegetation as a result of an exercise to remove the infestation of South African boxthorn.

=== Fauna ===
While sources dated 1987 and 1996 do not explicitly list fauna for Beatrice Islets, it is likely that fauna species which are exclusively birds reported as being present on The Spit and Busby Island such as the following will be observed on the Beatrice Islets: white-bellied sea-eagle, eastern curlew, fairy tern, little egret, pied cormorant, little pied cormorant, black-faced cormorant, Australian pelican, Australian white ibis, grey plover, greater sand plover, whimbrel, grey-tailed tattler, bar-tailed godwit, red knot, red-necked stint, red-capped plover, sooty oystercatcher, pied oystercatcher, curlew sandpiper, sharp-tailed sandpiper and ruddy turnstone.

== History ==
=== European discovery and use ===
Beatrice Islets are reported as probably being named after HMS Beatrice, a schooner which conducted coastal survey operations in South Australia during the 1870s. Beatrice Islets are one of the island sites from which guano was mined under licence from the South Australian Government prior to 1919.

== Protected areas status ==
The Beatrice Islets first received protected area status on 13 May 1909 under the Birds Protection Act 1900. The islets were subsequently proclaimed as a fauna reserve under the Fauna Conservation Act 1964, dedicated again in 1967 ‘for the conservation of wildlife habitat’ and then as a conservation park under the National Parks and Wildlife Act 1972 in 1972. As of 2012, the waters adjoining the islets are within the Encounter Marine Park. Beatrice Islets is also part of a larger area that includes the extent of The Spit within Nepean Bay including Busby Islet and which was included in a non-statutory listing of nationally important wetlands located in South Australia as part of A Directory of Important Wetlands in Australia.

== See also ==
- List of islands of Australia

== Citations and references ==
=== References ===
- Boating Industry Association of South Australia (BIA); South Australia. Department for Environment and Heritage (2005), South Australia's waters an atlas & guide, Boating Industry Association of South Australia, ISBN 978-1-86254-680-6
- South Australia. Department of Marine and Harbors (DMH) (1985), The Waters of South Australia a series of charts, sailing notes and coastal photographs, Dept. of Marine and Harbors, South Australia, ISBN 978-0-7243-7603-2
- National Parks and Wildlife Service (NPWS) (1987). Conservation Parks of Kangaroo Island Management Plan (PDF). National Parks and Wildlife Service, Department of Environment and Planning, South Australia. ISBN 0-7243-8983-0.
- A.C. Robinson; P. Canty; T. Mooney; P. Rudduck (1996). "South Australia's offshore islands" (PDF). Australian Heritage Commission. ISBN 978-0-644-35011-2.
- Robinson, A. C.; Armstrong, D. M., eds. (1999). A biological survey of Kangaroo Island South Australia in November 1989 and 1990 (PDF). Adelaide, SA: Heritage and Biodiversity Section, Department for Environment, Heritage and Aboriginal Affairs, South Australia. ISBN 978-0-7308-5862-1.
- "Australian Wetlands Database - Directory Wetland Information Sheet: Busby and Beatrice Islets - SA023". Commonwealth of Australia (C of A), Department of the Environment. 1995.
- Eyles, Kathy; Larmour, Geoff; Young, Sarah; Australia. Environment Australia; Natural Heritage Trust (Australia). National Wetlands Program (2001), A Directory of important wetlands in Australia (PDF) (3rd ed.), Environment Australia, ISBN 978-0-642-54721-7
- "Encounter Marine Park Management plan summary" (PDF). Department of Environment, Water and Natural Resources (DEWNR). 2012.
