= Busby quintuplets =

American quintuplets (born 2015)

- Born: Ava Lane, Olivia Marie, Hazel Grace, Riley Paige and Parker Kate Busby; April 8, 2015 (age 11); Houston, Texas, U.S
- Known for: being the first set of all female quintuplets born in U.S.A
- Parent(s): Danielle Busby (mother); Adam Busby (father)

The Busby quintuplets (born April 8, 2015), also known as the Busby Quints, are the first set of all female quintuplets born in the United States. Their childhood was documented on TLC's reality series, OutDaughtered (2016–2024).

== Birth ==
The quintuplets were conceived by intrauterine insemination, and they were born by C-Section in four minutes, on April 8, 2015, at 28 weeks, at the Woman's Hospital of Texas in Houston, Texas. They remained in the NICU for eight to twelve weeks and they required modest support for their breathing. Their birth weights ranged from 2 pounds to 2 pounds 6 ounces. They are the first-ever surviving all-female quintuplets born in the United States, and the first in the world since 1969. Olivia and Ava are identical twins. Ava was also the last to leave the hospital.

== OutDaughtered ==
On May 10, 2016, TLC released the first episode of OutDaughtered, a reality series who documented the life of Adam and Danielle Busby, being parents of six girls -their older daughter Blayke (born 2011), and the quintuplets. Season 10, which aired on May 7, 2024, was the last season to premiere.
