= Busby Islet Conservation Park =

Protected area in South Australia

- IUCN category Ia (strict nature reserve)
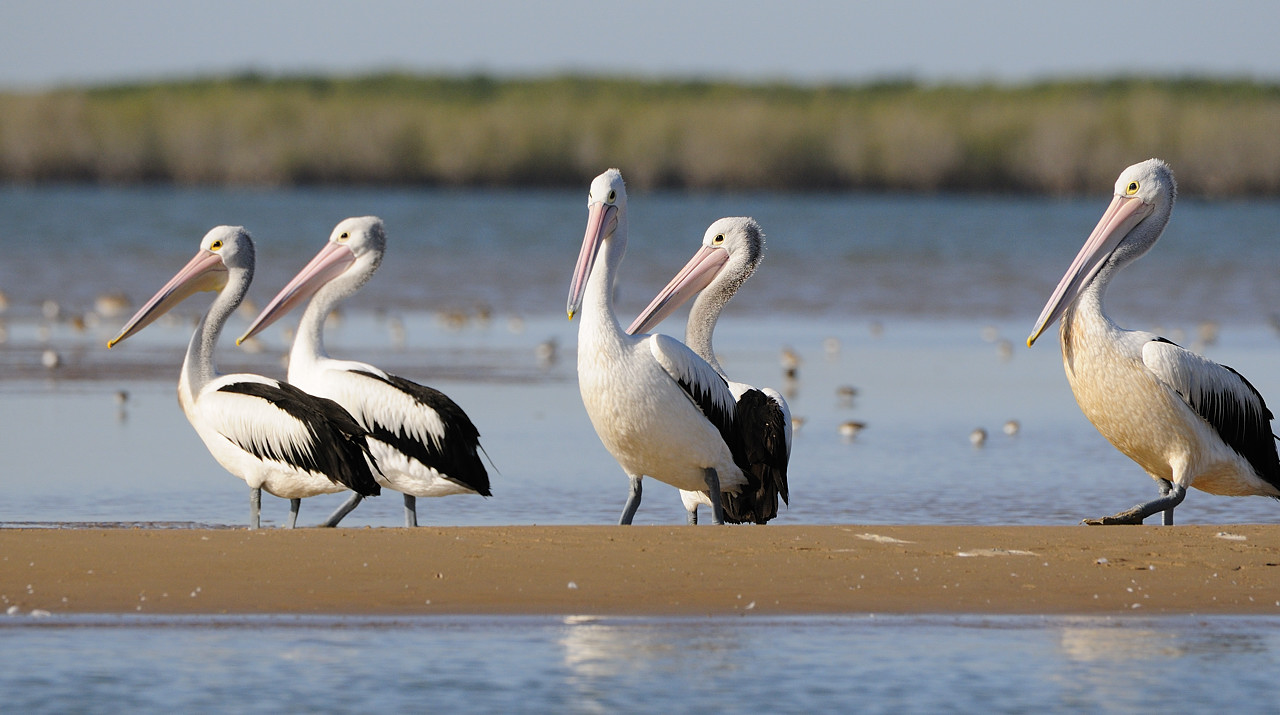
- Australian pelicans nest in the park

- Location within South Australia
- Location: South Australia
- Nearest city: Kingscote
- Coordinates: 35°37′28″S 137°38′26″E
- Area: 17 ha (42 acres)
- Established: 16 March 1967
- Governing body: Department for Environment and Water

Busby Islet Conservation Park is a protected area located on Busby Islet in Nepean Bay on the north coast of Kangaroo Island in South Australia. The conservation park is located about 2 kilometres (1.2 miles) north of the town of Kingscote and occupies an area of 17 hectares (42 acres). It was dedicated in 1967 for "the conservation of wildlife habitat", replacing previous statutory protection dating back to 1909. A management philosophy for the park published in 1987 supports the need to "ensure the conservation, in perpetuity, of the natural environment, in particular the breeding habitat for birds of the ocean and seashore". The conservation park is reported as supporting breeding populations of Australian pelicans, black-faced and pied cormorants, pied and sooty oystercatchers, and silver and Pacific gulls, serving as a roost site for migratory waders and being a place visited by rock parrots and little grassbirds. The conservation park was declared as a "no entry" area in October 2014. The conservation park is classified as an IUCN Category Ia protected area.
