= HMS Beatrice =

HMS Beatrice may refer to:

- HMS Beatrice (1862), a schooner launched in 1860 and acquired in 1862 and sold in 1890
- HMS Beatrice (1914), a hired trawler in service 1914-1919
