= Busby (given name) =

Busby is a masculine given name that may refer to the following notable people:

- Busby Berkeley (1895–1976), American movie director and musical choreographer
- Busby Noble (1958–2022), New Zealand Māori activist and Antarctic adventurer
