= HMS Beatrice (1862) =

Royal Navy survey schooner (1860)

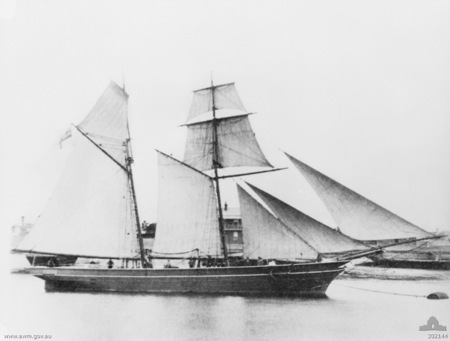
- Beatrice at Port Adelaide circa. 1880-1881

History

United Kingdom
- Name: HMS Beatrice
- Launched: 1860
- Acquired: 27 September 1862
- Decommissioned: 1880
- Fate: Wrecked on Waterhouse Island in Bass Strait

General characteristics
- Type: Schooner
- Tons burthen: 98 BM
- Length: 95 ft (29 m)
- Beam: 19 ft (5.8 m)
- Propulsion: Sail

HMS Beatrice was a 98-ton displacement, schooner launched in 1860 at Newhaven.

She was acquired by the Royal Navy and the Colony of South Australia on 27 September 1862 and served on the Australia Station and was used as a survey ship, and in this role she surveyed areas of the north coast of Australia, assisted the 1866 expedition of John McKinlay in the Northern Territory and surveyed the South Australian coast.

In 1880, she was purchased outright by the Colony of South Australia, where she was converted into a hulk in 1881 as a mooring marker for the mail steamers at Glenelg. Later she was moved in 1888 to Semaphore as a lightship. She was sold in 1890 to private owners. Re-rigged she was stranded near Port Lincoln on 4 February 1897 and after being re-floating was rebuilt.

An advertisement in the Port Lincoln, Tumby and West Coast Recorder 16 September 1904

- Pt Lincoln Shipping Co
- For Port Lincoln, North Shields, Louth and Tumby Bays, Beatrice sails Wednesday, Sept. 14. Freight prepaid.
- A. J. Dorward, Agent. R. Fricker

On a voyage to new owners on 14 July 1917 at Hobart she encountered heavy weather and became stranded at Tamar Heads, Tasmania.

While transporting a load of timber from Hobart for Melbourne she was wrecked off the south-eastern side of Waterhouse Island in Bass Strait on 9 April 1921. Her crew was saved and her gear salvaged.

Beatrice Islets in Nepean Bay on Kangaroo Island are named after HMS Beatrice.
