= Woman's Hospital of Texas =

The Woman's Hospital of Texas is a for-profit HCA Affiliated Hospital in Houston established in 1976 by doctors Stanley Rogers, Jack Moore and Warren Jacobs. As of 2009, the hospital's CEO was Ashley McClellan and its CNO was Veronica Martin.

The Woman's Hospital is known for its delivery of quadruplets in 2005 and quintuplets in 2015. As of 2008, the hospital had delivered more than 170,000 babies in total.

== History ==
In 1995, the Woman's Hospital of Texas completed renovations of its Labor and Delivery Unit and Newborn Intensive Care Unit. The renovations reportedly cost roughly 5.5 million dollars. The hospital underwent expansion in 2000 and 2009.

In 2005, the Breedlove quadruplets were born at the Woman's Hospital. They were reportedly the first set of identical, natural quadruplets to be born in Houston.

In 2015, the hospital facilitated the delivery of the Busby quintuplets, the first set of all female quintuplets to be born in the United States. The children would later star in the TLC reality show OutDaughtered.
