= Busby Noble =

New Zealand Māori activist (died 2022)

Busby Noble (1958 or 1959 – 23 March 2022) was a New Zealand Māori activist and Antarctic adventurer. He died of cancer at the age of 64.
