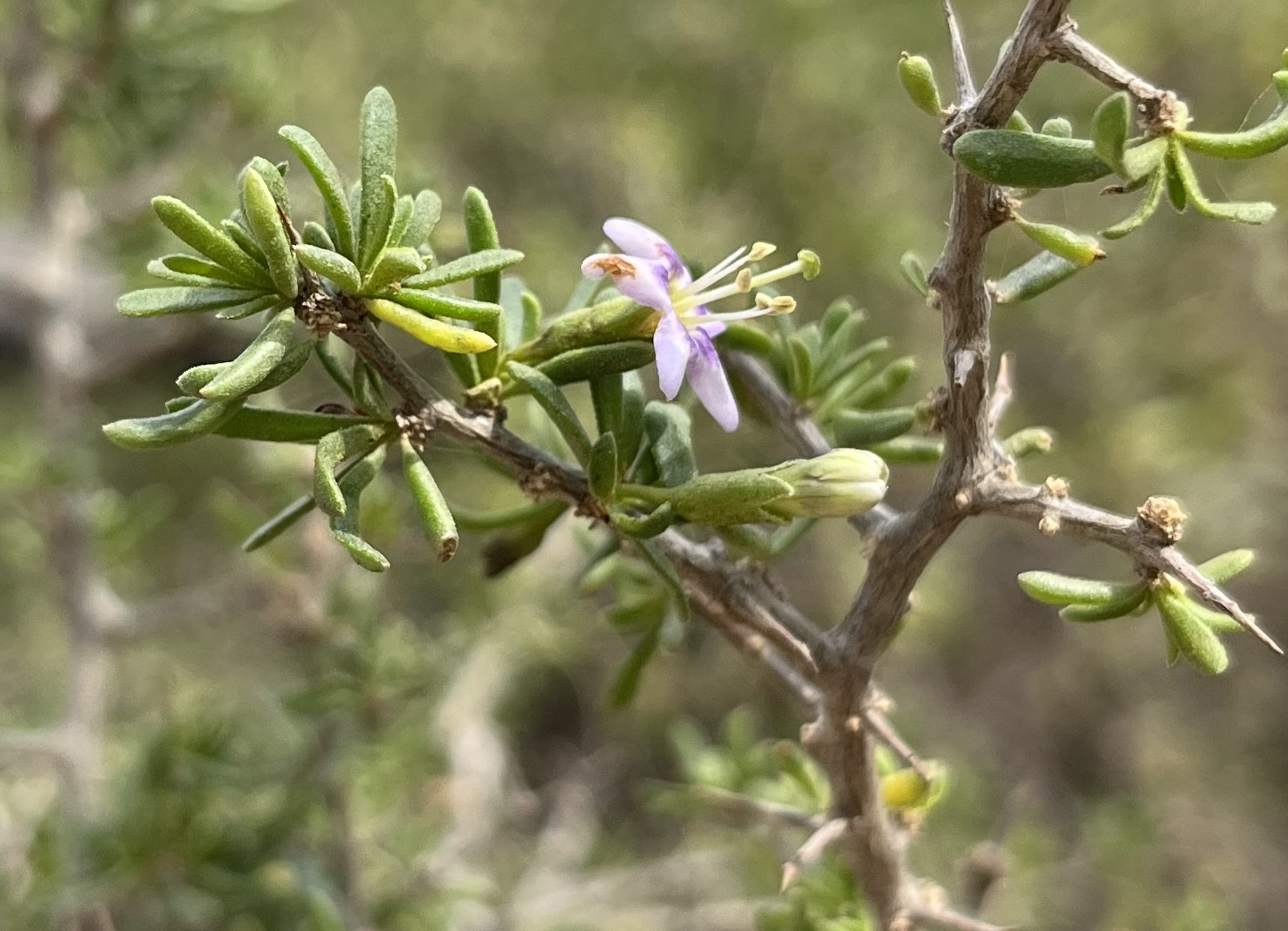

Scientific classification
- Kingdom: Plantae
- Clade: Tracheophytes
- Clade: Angiosperms
- Clade: Eudicots
- Clade: Asterids
- Order: Solanales
- Family: Solanaceae
- Genus: Lycium
- Species: L. pumilum

Binomial name
- Lycium pumilum Dammer

= Lycium pumilum =

Species of shrub

Lycium pumilum is a shrub in the nightshade family (Solanaceae) indigenous to South Africa and Namibia.

== Distribution ==
The species is widespread across the dry western interior parts of South Africa, specifically the Cape Provinces as well as the south western corner of the Free State Province. It also extends into southern Namibia.

== Description ==
Lycium pumilum is a small, stiff shrub. It has rigidly erect, but somewhat zig-zagging branches, that are covered in thorns that are of randomly varying lengths along the branch. The young stems are white-ish, while the older stems become dark glossy brown.

Like many other Lycium species, the leaves are oblong to narrowly-elliptic in shape. They are succulent but flattened. Their colour is faintly blue-green (glaucous).

The flowers emerge from the leaf axils. The corolla is campanulate (not tubular), with five large reflexed lobes (petals). The stamens are extended and very clearly exserted from the corolla mouth. The calyx is tubular-to-campanulate, with its length and width being almost equal. The calyx extends to cover two-thirds or more of the corolla tube (similar to that of Lycium ferocissimum).

The fruits are small red or orange-red berries, that are round/spherical.
