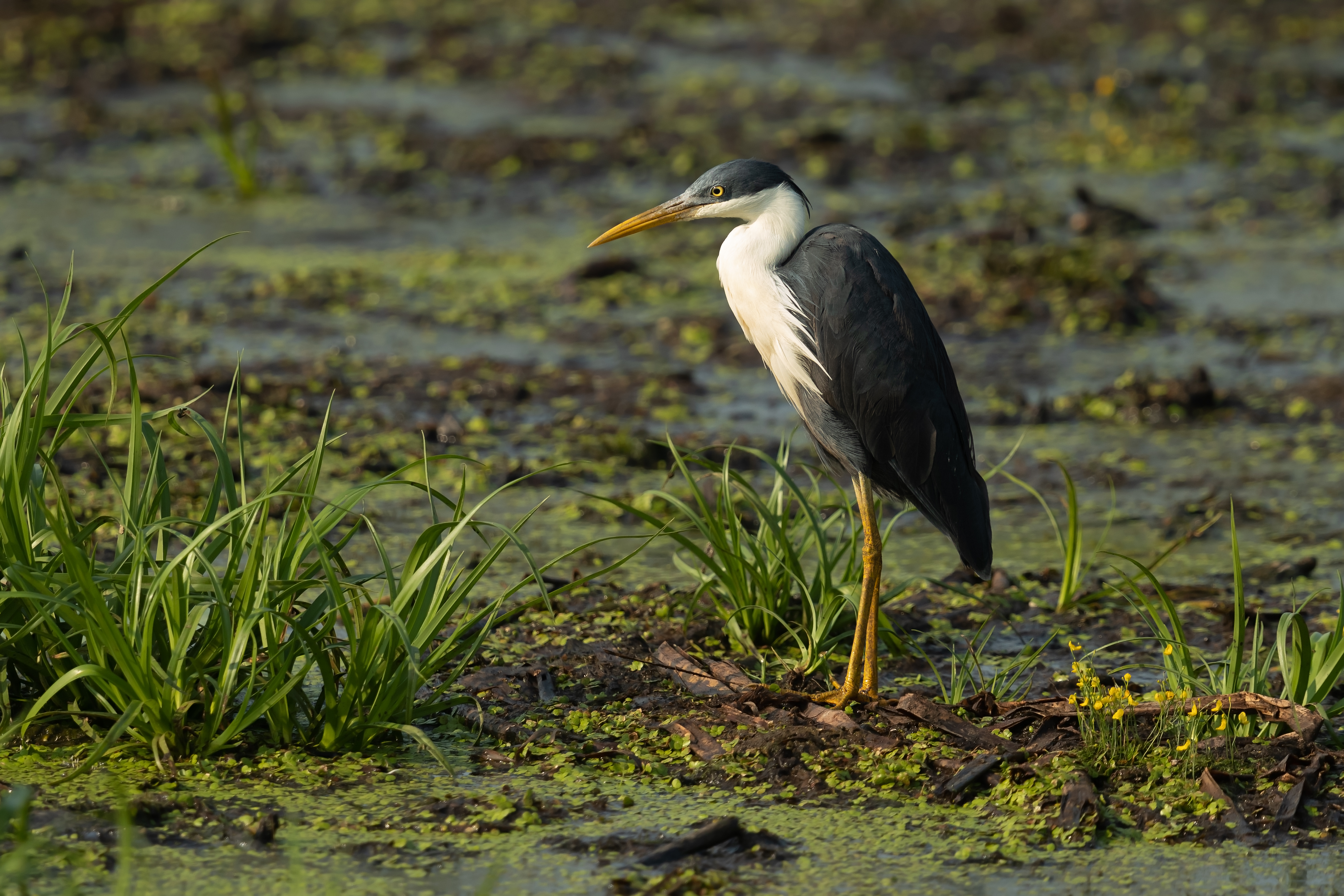
- At Fogg Dam Conservation Reserve

Conservation status
- Least Concern (IUCN 3.1)

Scientific classification
- Kingdom: Animalia
- Phylum: Chordata
- Class: Aves
- Order: Pelecaniformes
- Family: Ardeidae
- Genus: Egretta
- Species: E. picata

Binomial name
- Egretta picata (Gould, 1845)
- Distribution. Green: year-round breeding, blue: nonbreeding.

Synonyms
- Notophoyx aruensis; Ardea picata

= Pied heron =

Species of bird

The pied heron (Egretta picata), also known as the pied egret is a bird found in coastal and subcoastal areas of monsoonal northern Australia as well as some parts of Wallacea and New Guinea.

== Taxonomy ==
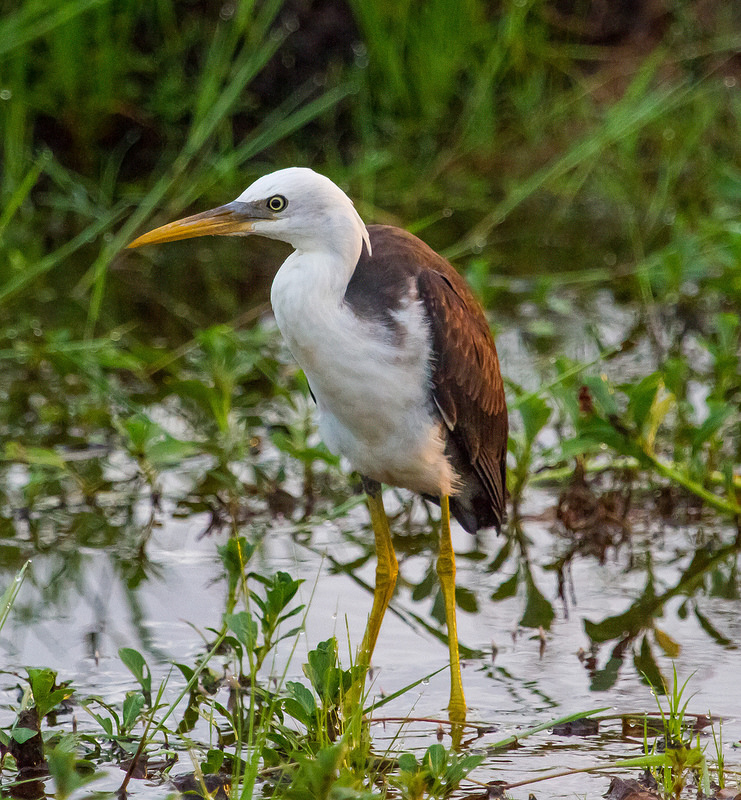
Pied heron (juvenile) - Fogg Dam - Middle Point - Northern Territory - Australia

The species was originally described by ornithologist John Gould in 1845. Recent taxonomists put this species in the genus Egretta. There are no recognised subspecies.

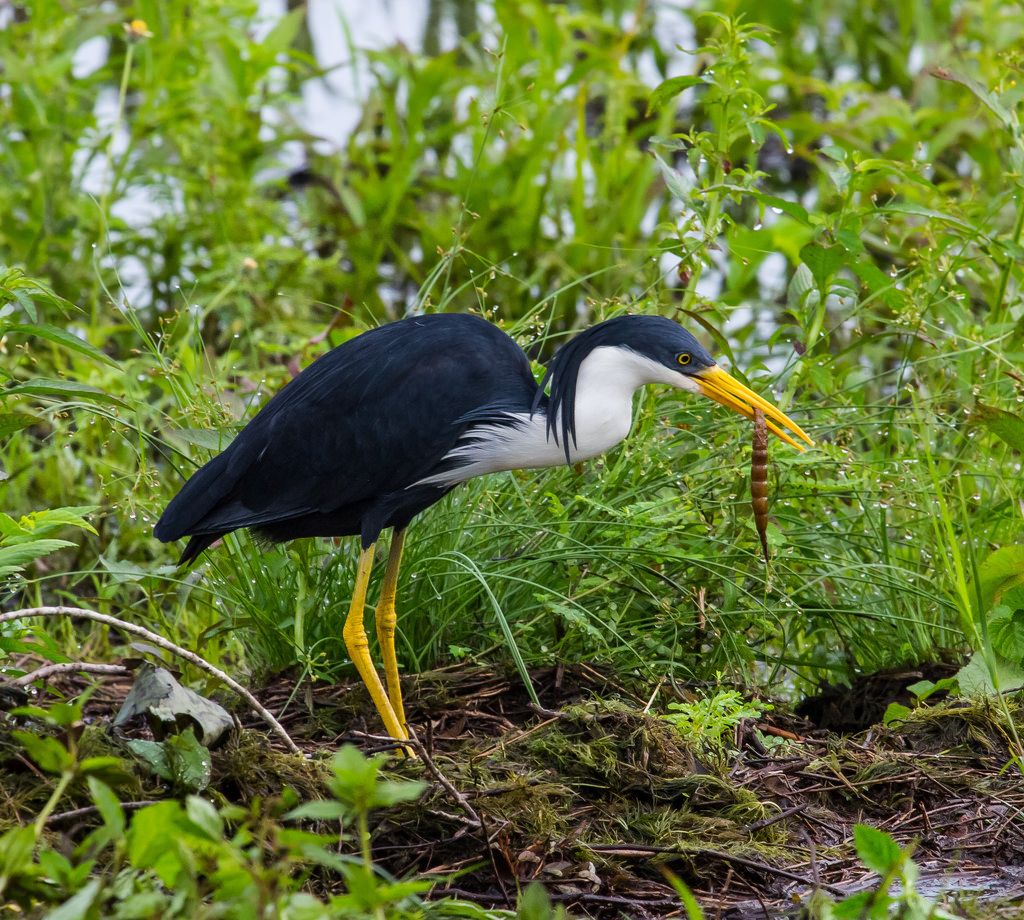
Pied heron feeding - Fogg Dam - Middle Point - Northern Territory - Australia

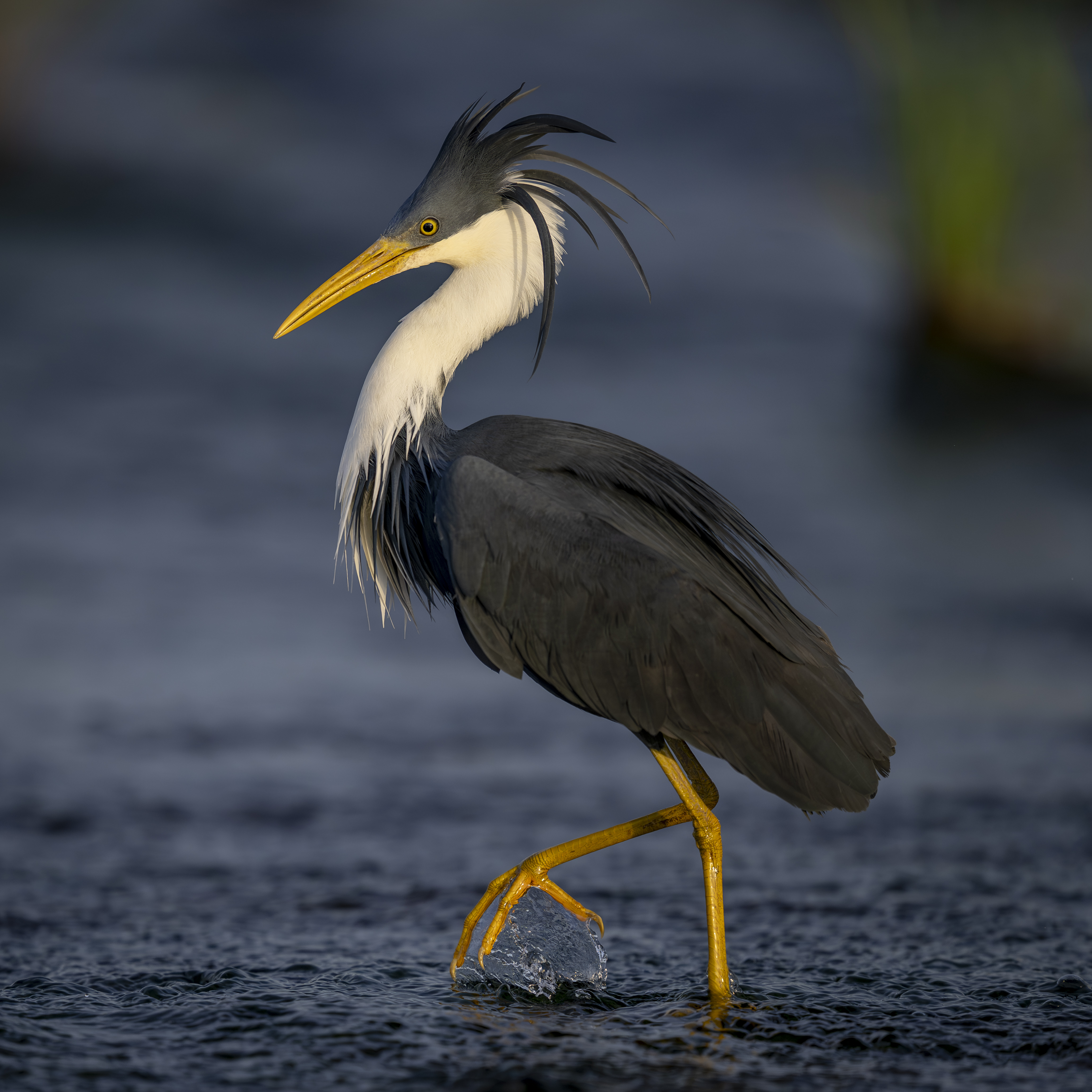
Pied heron in breeding plumage - Fogg Dam - Middle Point - Northern Territory - Australia

== Description ==
It is a small heron, 43–55 cm (17–22 in) long, with dark slaty wings, body, and crested head, with a white throat and neck. The appearance is similar to the white-necked heron. Males (247–280 g (8.7–9.9 oz)) are heavier than females (225–242 g (7.9–8.5 oz)), but the two are similar in appearance.

Immature birds lack the crest as well as the dark colouring on the head and may look like small versions of the white-necked heron. The juveniles were once classified as a separate species.

== Distribution and habitat ==
Its habitat mainly comprises a range of wetlands and wet grasslands.

== Behaviour ==
=== Call ===
The call of the pied heron is a loud 'awk' or 'ohrk' in flight. Soft cooing is given around the nest. Little else is known about vocalisations.

=== Breeding ===
Breeding takes place from February to May. It nests in trees above the water, including mangroves, often colonially with other species of heron. 1–2 blue-green eggs are laid in a shallow platform of sticks.

=== Feeding ===
It feeds on insects, frogs, crabs, fish and other small aquatic animals. Insects are the most important source of food. It may feed alone or in groups of up to a thousand individuals.

== Bibliography ==
- Marchant, S.; & Higgins, P.J. (Coordinators). (2000). Handbook of Australian, New Zealand and Antarctic Birds. Vol.1: Ratites to Ducks. Oxford University Press: Melbourne. ISBN 978-0-19-553068-1
