= OutDaughtered =

American reality show

- Genre: Reality television
- Starring: Adam Busby; Danielle Busby; Blayke Louise Busby; Ava Lane Busby; Olivia Marie Busby; Hazel Grace Busby; Riley Paige Busby; Parker Kate Busby
- Country of origin: United States
- Original language: English
- No. of seasons: 10
- No. of episodes: 81

Production
- Running time: 45 minutes

Original release
- Network: TLC
- Release: May 10, 2016 – July 2, 2024

OutDaughtered is an American reality series on TLC starring Adam and Danielle Busby, parents of the only American all-girl quintuplets on record. The series debuted on May 10, 2016 and premiered its tenth season on May 7, 2024.

== Synopsis ==
The Busby family consists of Adam and Danielle Busby, who have been married since 2006; eldest daughter Blayke Louise; and quintuplets Ava Lane, Olivia Marie, Hazel Grace, Riley Paige and Parker Kate.

Adam and Danielle had struggled with infertility, ultimately becoming pregnant both times by intrauterine insemination.

Danielle delivered the quintuplets via Caesarean section 28 weeks into the pregnancy. Shortly after birth, heart murmurs were detected in all five girls; this was treated with medication. The quints spent the first eight to twelve weeks of their lives in the neonatal intensive care unit at the Woman's Hospital of Texas, before being released to go home between June and July 2015.

Hazel's eye condition, congenital nystagmus, has been chronicled through the series. The condition causes Hazel to have uncontrolled eye movements and hold her head at unusual angles to compensate for her lack of clear vision. In 2016, Hazel underwent eye surgery in an attempt to improve her condition. In 2017, Hazel was diagnosed as having an astigmatism in her left eye, which may ultimately be responsible for it occasionally turning in as a result of being underdeveloped. She was prescribed glasses to help with her left eye farsightedness with the hope that her vision will improve as her eye develops.

Adam has described experiencing postpartum depression.

== Episodes ==
=== Series overview ===
Season	Episodes	Originally released	
Season	Episodes	First released	Last released
1	4	May 10, 2016	May 31, 2016
2	10	November 15, 2016	January 17, 2017
3	10	July 11, 2017	September 12, 2017
4	13	July 10, 2018	October 2, 2018
5	8	June 11, 2019	July 30, 2019
6	5	October 1, 2019	October 29, 2019
7	4	June 2, 2020	June 30, 2020
8	11	February 23, 2021	May 4, 2021
9	8	July 11, 2023	August 29, 2023
10	8	May 7, 2024	June 25, 2024

=== Season 1 (2016) ===
No. overall	No. in season	Title	Original release date	US viewers (millions)
1	1	"Make Room for Quints"	May 10, 2016	1.249
2	2	"Chaos with Quints"	May 17, 2016	1.067
3	3	"Quintuple Trouble"	May 24, 2016	0.849
4	4	"Should We Stay or Should We Go?"	May 31, 2016	1.246

=== Season 2 (2016–17) ===
No. overall	No. in season	Title	Original release date	US viewers (millions)
5	1	"Catching Up with the Quints"	November 15, 2016	1.075
6	2	"All Eyes on Hazel"	November 22, 2016	1.012
7	3	"A Quint in Crisis"	November 29, 2016	1.107
8	4	"Quint-fluenza"	December 6, 2016	0.933
9	5	"This Little Quint Stays Home"	December 13, 2016	1.023
10	6	"5 Babies on a Budget"	December 20, 2016	1.114
11	7	"A Nightmare on Quint Street"	December 27, 2016	1.165
12	8	"Quint-cation Chaos"	January 3, 2017	1.166
13	9	"A Thanksgiving Miracle"	January 10, 2017	1.516
14	10	"The Quints Take Manhattan"	January 17, 2017	1.344

=== Season 3 (2017) ===
No. overall	No. in season	Title	Original release date	US viewers (millions)
15	1	"Dawn of the Terrible Twos"	July 11, 2017	1.479
16	2	"A Little Potty Never Killed Nobody"	July 18, 2017	1.403
17	3	"Good Quints Gone Bad"	July 25, 2017	1.304
18	4	"Extreme Quint Makeover"	August 1, 2017	1.449
19	5	"Multiple Births, Multiple Birthdays"	August 8, 2017	1.444
20	6	"The Nightmare Before Easter"	August 15, 2017	1.199
21	7	"While the Busbys Are Away the Quints Will Play!"	August 22, 2017	1.245
22	8	"Battle of the Busby Baby Photos"	August 29, 2017	1.233
23	9	"Mother's Day Getaway"	September 5, 2017	1.349
24	10	"The Busby's Newest Addition"	September 12, 2017	1.226

=== Season 4 (2018) ===
No. overall	No. in season	Title	Original release date	US viewers (millions)
25	1	"The Quints Have Taken Over!"	July 10, 2018	1.361
26	2	"A Very Busby Thanksgiving"	July 17, 2018	1.285
27	3	"It's My Potty and I'll Cry If I Want To"	July 24, 2018	1.339
28	4	"When Danielle's Away, the Quints Will Play"	July 31, 2018	1.296
29	5	"It's Beginning to Look a Lot Like Quintmas"	August 7, 2018	1.198
30	6	"I'm Dreaming of a Cajun Christmas"	August 14, 2018	1.452
31	7	"New Year, New Responsibilities"	August 21, 2018	1.594
32	8	"The Last Time This Happened We Had Quints!"	August 28, 2018	1.718
33	9	"OutValentined"	September 4, 2018	1.433
34	10	"Houston, We Have a Potty Problem"	September 11, 2018	1.344
35	11	"Every Quint for Herself"	September 18, 2018	1.598
36	12	"Busby Birthday Bash"	September 25, 2018	1.323
37	13	"Hawaii Five-Uh-Oh"	October 2, 2018	1.362

=== Season 5 (2019) ===
No. overall	No. in season	Title	Original release date	US viewers (millions)
38	1	"Young, Wild & Three"	June 11, 2019	1.291
39	2	"Our Home Is Sick"	June 18, 2019	1.430
40	3	"The Quints Get Schooled"	June 25, 2019	1.410
41	4	"New House, New Problems"	July 2, 2019	1.420
42	5	"The Nightmare Before Quintmas"	July 9, 2019	1.283
43	6	"Lights, Camera, Quints!"	July 16, 2019	1.292
44	7	"Quints on the High Seas"	July 23, 2019	1.320
45	8	"There's No Place Like Home"	July 30, 2019	1.324

=== Season 6 (2019) ===
No. overall	No. in season	Title	Original release date	US viewers (millions)
46	1	"Fournado Warning"	October 1, 2019	1.312
47	2	"Veggies...Ewww!"	October 8, 2019	1.249
48	3	"Not So Quiet Riot"	October 15, 2019	1.186
49	4	"Quint Tested, Parent Approved"	October 22, 2019	1.179
50	5	"Big Decisions in the Big Country"	October 29, 2019	1.060

=== Season 7 (2020) ===
No. overall	No. in season	Title	Original release date	US viewers (millions)
51	1	"My Busby Valentine"	June 2, 2020	1.092
52	2	"Snow-Cation"	June 16, 2020	1.306
53	3	"Coronavirus Changes Everything"	June 23, 2020	1.238
54	4	"Quints in Quarantine"	June 30, 2020	1.195

=== Season 8 (2021) ===
No. overall	No. in season	Title	Original release date	US viewers (millions)
55	1	"Escape from Quarantine"	February 23, 2021	N/A
56	2	"Quints' Night Out"	March 2, 2021	N/A
57	3	"Just When We Thought We Were Safe"	March 9, 2021	N/A
58	4	"Kindergarten Quints"	March 16, 2021	N/A
59	5	"Too Scared to Sleep"	March 23, 2021	N/A
60	6	"Girl Fights and Big Heights"	March 30, 2021	N/A
61	7	"Nacho-Typical Thanksgiving"	April 6, 2021	N/A
62	8	"Broken Heart for the Holidays"	April 13, 2021	N/A
63	9	"Silent Night Holy Slime"	April 20, 2021	N/A
64	10	"Breaking the Piggy Bank"	April 27, 2021	N/A
65	11	"Busby Beach Babes"	May 4, 2021	N/A

=== Season 9 (2023) ===
No. overall	No. in season	Title	Original release date	US viewers (millions)
66	1	"Adam and the Thanksgiving Disaster"	July 11, 2023	N/A
67	2	"Riley and the Catwalk"	July 18, 2023	N/A
68	3	"Ava and the First Dance"	July 25, 2023	N/A
69	4	"Blayke and the Babysitting"	August 1, 2023	N/A
70	5	"Hazel and the Sloth"	August 8, 2023	0.60
71	6	"Danielle and the Bacon"	August 15, 2023	0.59
72	7	"Parker and the Glamping"	August 22, 2023	0.61
73	8	"Olivia and the Pink Limo"	August 29, 2023	0.68

=== Season 10 (2024) ===
No. overall	No. in season	Title	Original release date	US viewers (millions)
74	1	"This Could Change Everything"	May 7, 2024	N/A
75	2	"How to Train Your Adam"	May 14, 2024	N/A
76	3	"Making the Cut"	May 21, 2024	N/A
77	4	"The Undoing of Aunt Kiki"	May 28, 2024	N/A
78	5	"Channeling Chaos"	June 4, 2024	N/A
79	6	"Trick or Retreat"	June 11, 2024	N/A
80	7	"Cheer Dad"	June 18, 2024	N/A
81	8	"Just Let It Go"	June 25, 2024	N/A

== Specials ==
Featured season	Title	Original release date
3	"Countdown to the New Season"	July 11, 2017
3	"Life with Quints: Battle of the Busby Baby Photos"	September 5, 2017
3	"Life with Quints: Mother's Day Getaway"	September 12, 2017
5	"Quintessential Questions"	July 30, 2019
6	"Raising Quints 101"	November 5, 2019
8	"Quint Talk"	February 23, 2021
8	"Portrait of a Busby Girl, Pt. 1"	March 2, 2021
8	"Portrait of a Busby Girl, Pt. 2"	March 9, 2021
8	"The Busby Awards Show"	April 27, 2021
8	"The Untold Stories"	May 4, 2021
9	"Recap: The First 5 Years"	June 27, 2023
10	"FAQ Special"	July 2, 2024
