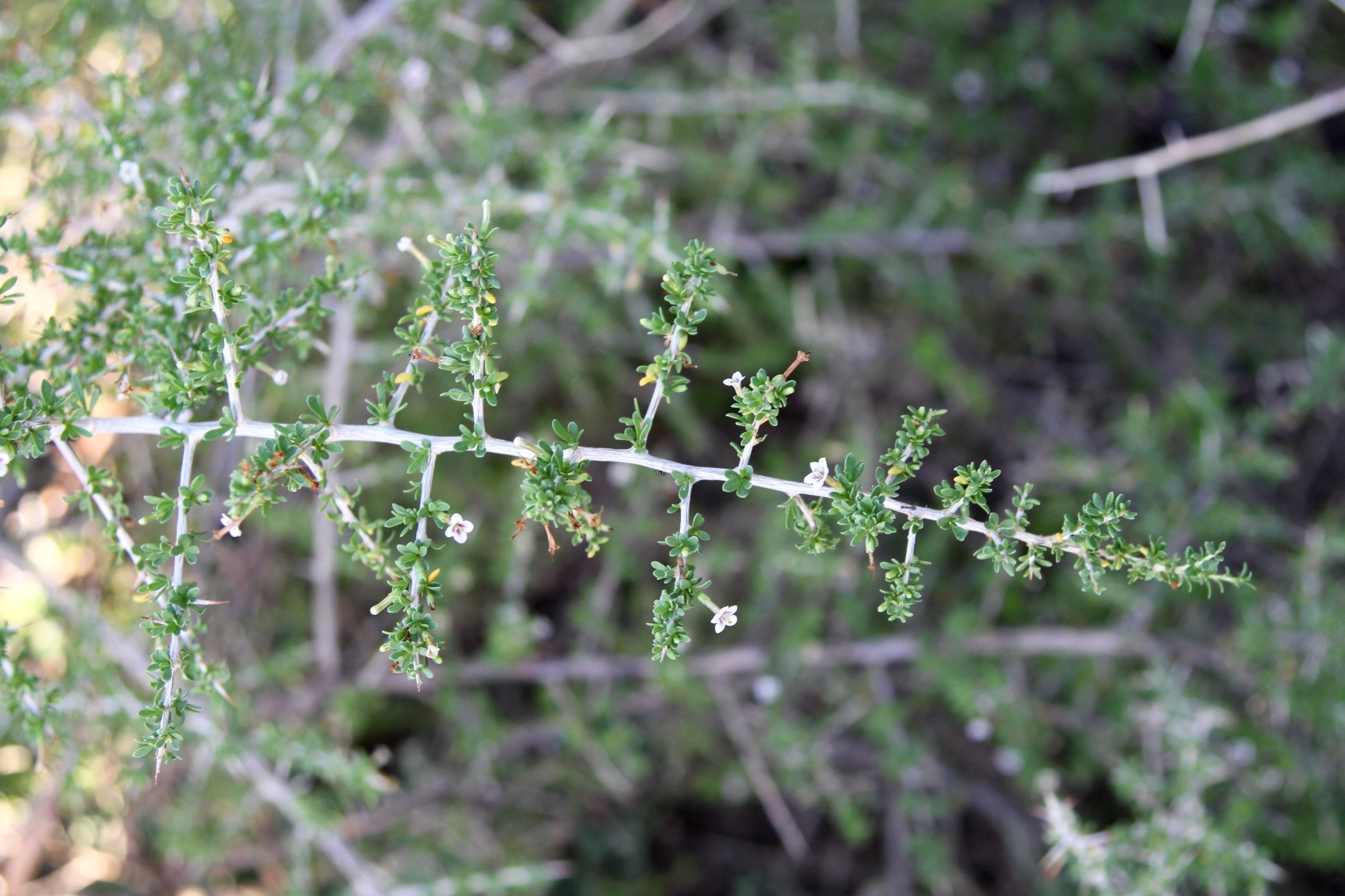

Scientific classification
- Kingdom: Plantae
- Clade: Tracheophytes
- Clade: Angiosperms
- Clade: Eudicots
- Clade: Asterids
- Order: Solanales
- Family: Solanaceae
- Genus: Lycium
- Species: L. horridum

Binomial name
- Lycium horridum Thunb.

= Lycium horridum =

Species of shrub

Lycium horridum is a shrub in the nightshade family (Solanaceae) indigenous to South Africa as well as southern Namibia and Botswana.

== Distribution ==
The species is widespread across all of South Africa, except for the eastern Lowveld and KwaZulu-Natal. It also extends into the southern portions of Namibia and Botswana.

== Description ==
Lycium horridum is a rigid shrub, with stout thorns that gradually become shorter towards the tips of the stems. This gives to the branches a somewhat tapering, conical appearance, that can sometimes be used to recognise this species. The young stems are initially green and soft, before hardening and becoming white (usually with dark streaks). The older stems become dark grey-to-brown.

Like many other Lycium species, the leaves are oblong, to narrowly-elliptic or linear in shape. They are succulent but flattened, and are clustered on inconspicuous brachblasts.

The flowers emerge from the leaf axils. The corolla is small, white and tubular, with five (sometimes four) spreading lobes (petals) that are much shorter than the tube. The stamens are only slightly exserted from the corolla mouth. The calyx is tubular (about twice as long as wide) and, due to its shorter length, covers less than half of the corolla tube.

Unlike most of the African species of Lycium, L. horridum is dioecious.

The fruits are small red berries, that are rounded-to-ovoid but with a slightly pointed tip.
