= Channel Point Community, Northern Territory =

Channel Point Community
- Town
- Coordinates: 13°10′09″S 130°07′23″E
- Country: Australia
- State: Northern Territory
- LGA: Unincorporated area
- Location: 190 km (120 mi) from Darwin; 761 km (473 mi) from {{{location2}}}
- Established: 1992
- Elevation: 3 m (9.8 ft)
- Time zone: UTC+9:30 (ACST)
- Postcode: 0822
- Mean max temp: 31.4 °C (88.5 °F)
- Mean min temp: 22.4 °C (72.3 °F)
- Annual rainfall: 1,866.5 mm (73.48 in)

Channel Point Community is a private community in Northern Territory of Australia. It is in the Rakula locality south-west of Darwin. Channel Point Community may be best described as a private community of holiday homes with access to recreational fishing areas and the appeal of a remote, beachside location. It is not accessible to the public.

The Channel Point Community was established by a group of Darwin businesspeople in 1992. It is held and managed by Fitzroy Pty Ltd under Crown Lease in Perpetuity 1066. The community includes 27 blocks that are primarily subleased to individuals and families for recreational purposes. It is uncertain whether Aboriginal people affected by the development were consulted regarding the establishment of the Channel Point Community or its ongoing activities.

== Geography ==
=== Climate ===
Channel Point has a tropical savanna climate (Köppen: Aw) with a wet season from November to April and a dry season from May to October. On average, the community experiences 97.6 clear days and 104.9 cloudy days per annum. Extreme temperatures ranged from 38.5 °C (101.3 °F) on 15 November 2021 to 9.9 °C (49.8 °F) on 30 June 2007. The wettest recorded day was 4 December 2000 with 252.4 mm (9.94 in) of rainfall.

Climate data for Channel Point (13.17°S 130.12°E) (3 m (9.8 ft) AMSL) (1990-2025)
Month	Jan	Feb	Mar	Apr	May	Jun	Jul	Aug	Sep	Oct	Nov	Dec	Year
Record high °C (°F)	35.0 (95.0)	35.0 (95.0)	35.2 (95.4)	35.5 (95.9)	35.2 (95.4)	34.1 (93.4)	34.7 (94.5)	36.0 (96.8)	38.0 (100.4)	37.7 (99.9)	38.5 (101.3)	35.7 (96.3)	38.5 (101.3)
Mean daily maximum °C (°F)	31.7 (89.1)	31.6 (88.9)	32.1 (89.8)	32.6 (90.7)	31.2 (88.2)	29.5 (85.1)	29.2 (84.6)	29.9 (85.8)	31.3 (88.3)	32.3 (90.1)	32.9 (91.2)	32.5 (90.5)	31.4 (88.5)
Mean daily minimum °C (°F)	25.2 (77.4)	25.2 (77.4)	24.9 (76.8)	23.7 (74.7)	20.4 (68.7)	17.8 (64.0)	17.1 (62.8)	18.1 (64.6)	21.7 (71.1)	24.3 (75.7)	25.0 (77.0)	25.3 (77.5)	22.4 (72.3)
Record low °C (°F)	18.0 (64.4)	20.3 (68.5)	18.4 (65.1)	15.5 (59.9)	13.5 (56.3)	9.9 (49.8)	10.0 (50.0)	10.9 (51.6)	14.0 (57.2)	17.7 (63.9)	19.8 (67.6)	20.6 (69.1)	9.9 (49.8)
Average precipitation mm (inches)	463.9 (18.26)	384.4 (15.13)	324.4 (12.77)	98.0 (3.86)	11.7 (0.46)	1.7 (0.07)	1.2 (0.05)	3.2 (0.13)	11.2 (0.44)	69.1 (2.72)	140.6 (5.54)	324.7 (12.78)	1,866.5 (73.48)
Average precipitation days (≥ 0.2 mm)	20.3	18.8	17.0	7.9	1.7	0.4	0.1	0.5	1.6	6.3	10.5	17.1	102.2
Average afternoon relative humidity (%)	76	76	72	60	52	51	52	56	62	65	66	72	63
Average dew point °C (°F)	25.6 (78.1)	25.5 (77.9)	24.8 (76.6)	22.5 (72.5)	18.7 (65.7)	16.4 (61.5)	16.4 (61.5)	18.2 (64.8)	21.8 (71.2)	23.6 (74.5)	24.5 (76.1)	25.1 (77.2)	21.9 (71.5)
Source: Bureau of Meteorology (1990-2025)
