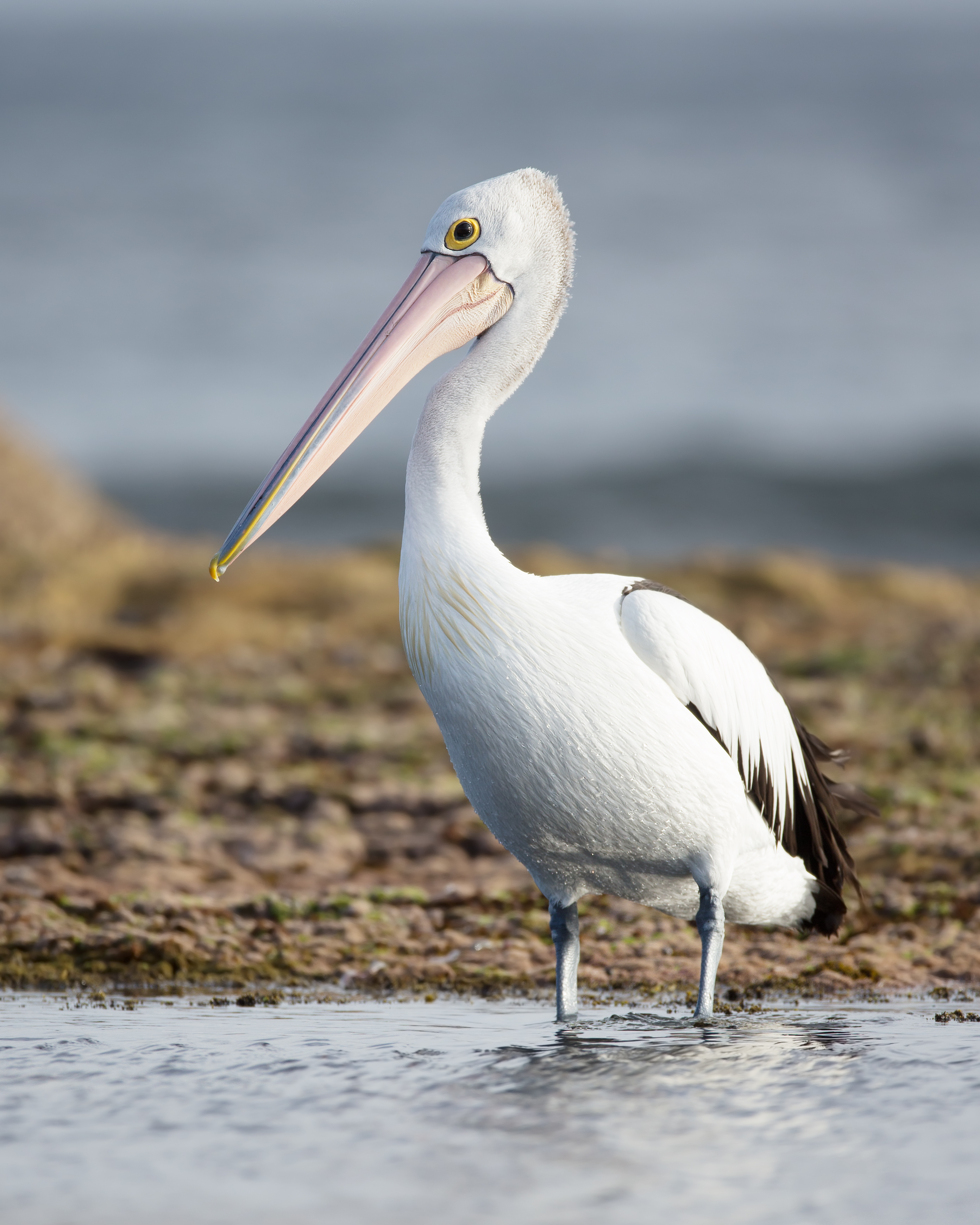

Conservation status
- Least Concern (IUCN 3.1)

Scientific classification
- Kingdom: Animalia
- Phylum: Chordata
- Class: Aves
- Order: Pelecaniformes
- Family: Pelecanidae
- Genus: Pelecanus
- Species: P. conspicillatus

Binomial name
- Pelecanus conspicillatus Temminck, 1824
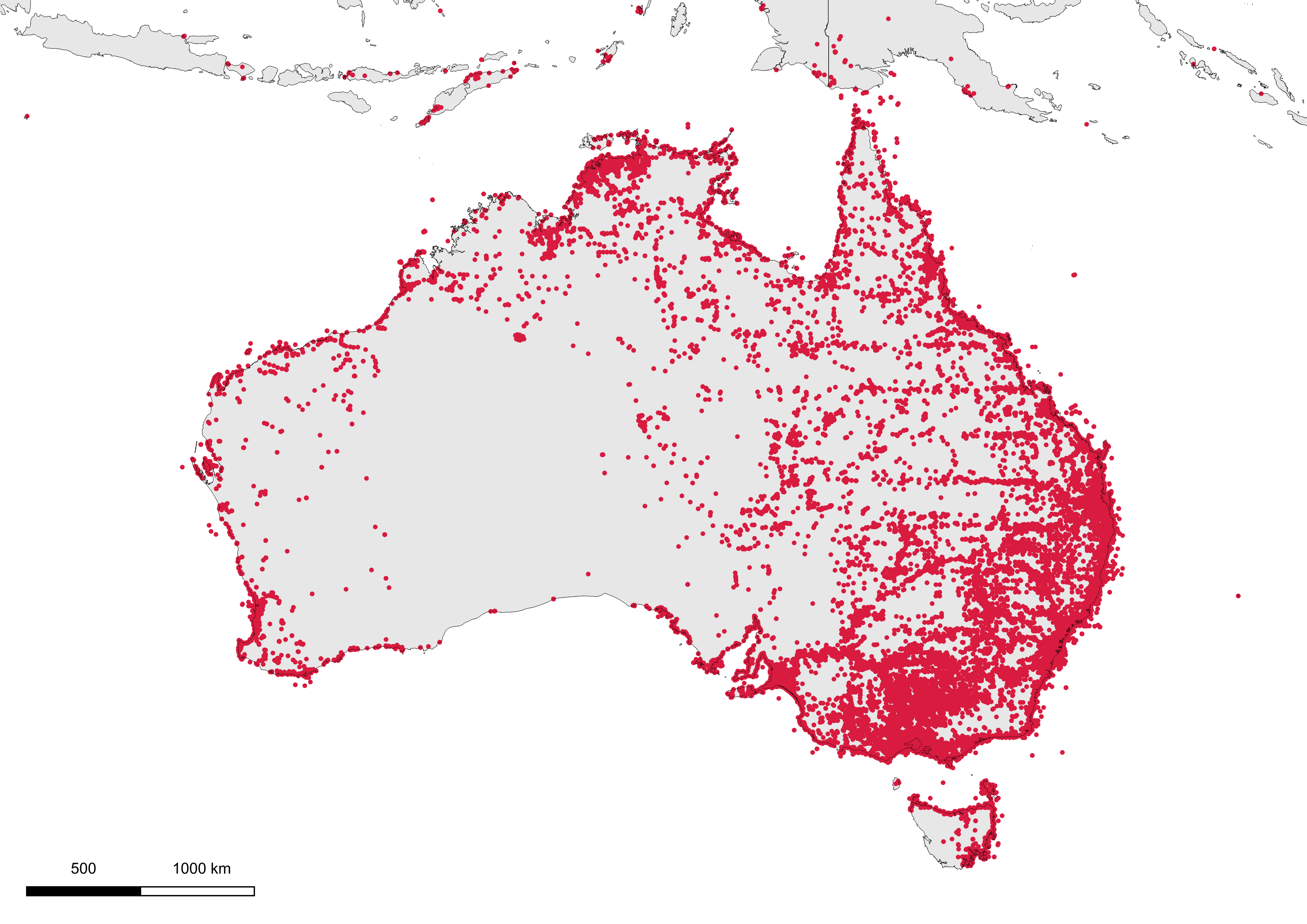
- Species distribution

= Australian pelican =

Species of bird

The Australian pelican (Pelecanus conspicillatus) is a large waterbird in the family Pelecanidae, widespread on the inland and coastal waters of Australia and New Guinea, also in Fiji, parts of Indonesia and as a vagrant in New Zealand. It is a predominantly white bird with black wings and a pink bill. It has been recorded as having the longest bill of any living bird. It mainly eats fish, but will also consume birds and scavenge for scraps if the opportunity arises.

== Taxonomy ==
The Australian pelican was first described by Dutch naturalist Coenraad Jacob Temminck in 1824. Its specific epithet is derived from the Latin verb conspicere, meaning 'to behold', and refers to the 'spectacled' appearance created by its conspicuous eye markings.

=== Description ===
The Australian pelican is medium-sized by pelican standards, with a wingspan of 2.3 to 2.6 m (7.5 to 8.5 ft). Weight can range from 4 to 13 kg (8.8 to 28.7 lb), although most of these pelicans weigh between 4.54 and 7.7 kg (10.0 and 17.0 lb). The average weight of four unsexed Australian pelicans was 5.5 kg (12 lb), making this the second heaviest Australian flying bird species on average, after the brolga, although the male of the more sexually dimorphic Australian bustard weighs a bit more at average and maximum weights (both birds are, of course, much smaller than the cassowary and emu). The pale, pinkish bill is enormous, even by pelican standards, and is the largest bill in the avian world. The record-sized bill was 50 cm (20 in) long. Females are slightly smaller with a notably smaller bill, which can measure as small as 34.6 cm (13.6 in) at maturity. The total length is boosted by the bill to 152–188 cm (60–74 in), which makes it rank alongside the Dalmatian pelican as the longest of pelicans.

Overall, the Australian pelican is predominantly white in colour. There is a white panel on the upper-wing and a white-V on the rump set against black along the primaries. During courtship, the orbital skin and distal quarter of the bill are orange-coloured with the pouch variously turning dark blue, pink and scarlet. The non-breeding adult has its bill and eye-ring a pale yellow and the pouch is a pale pinkish. Juvenile birds are similar to the adults, but with black replaced with brown and the white patch on upper wing reduced. Overall, their appearance is somewhat similar to several other pelicans, though the species is allopatric.

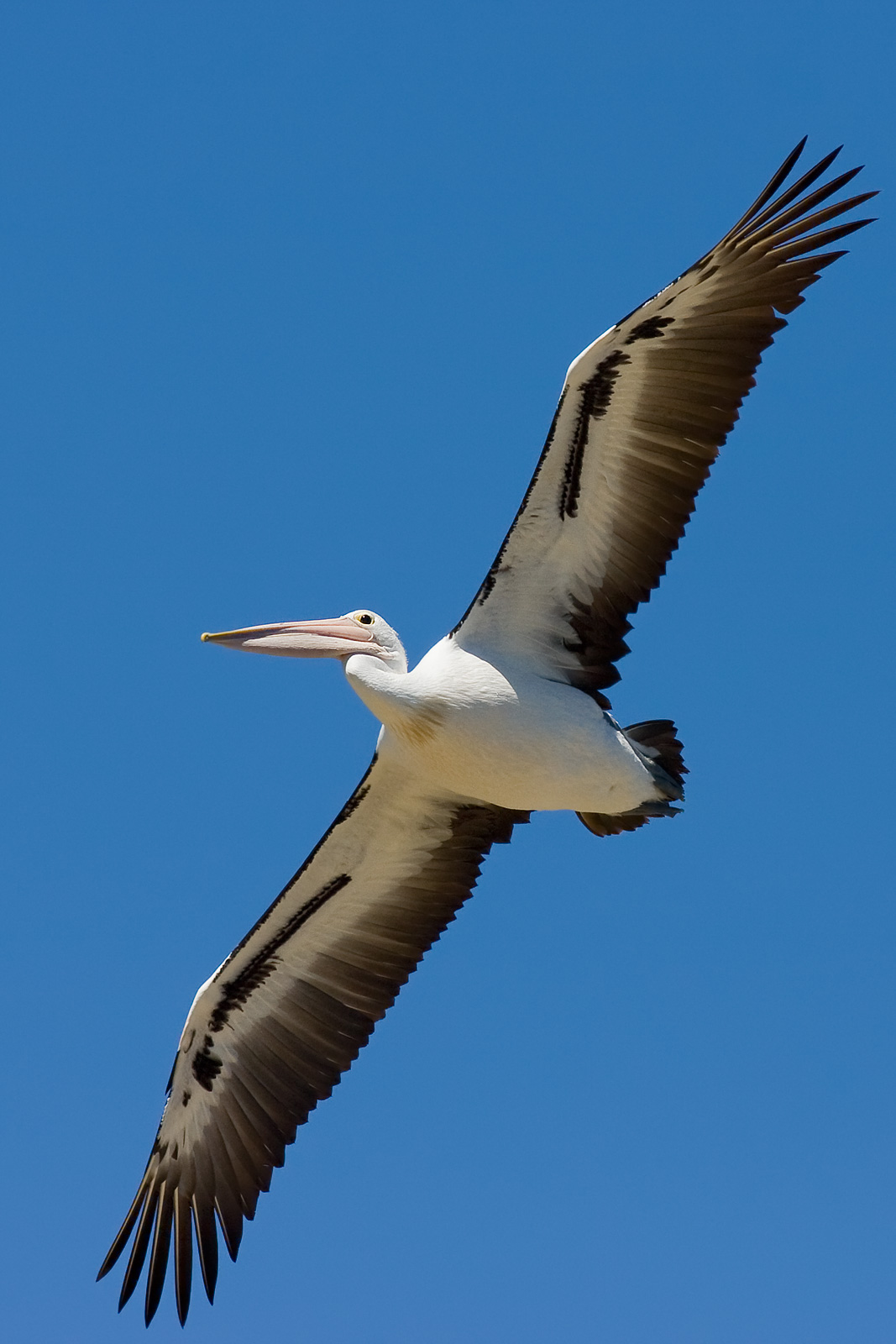

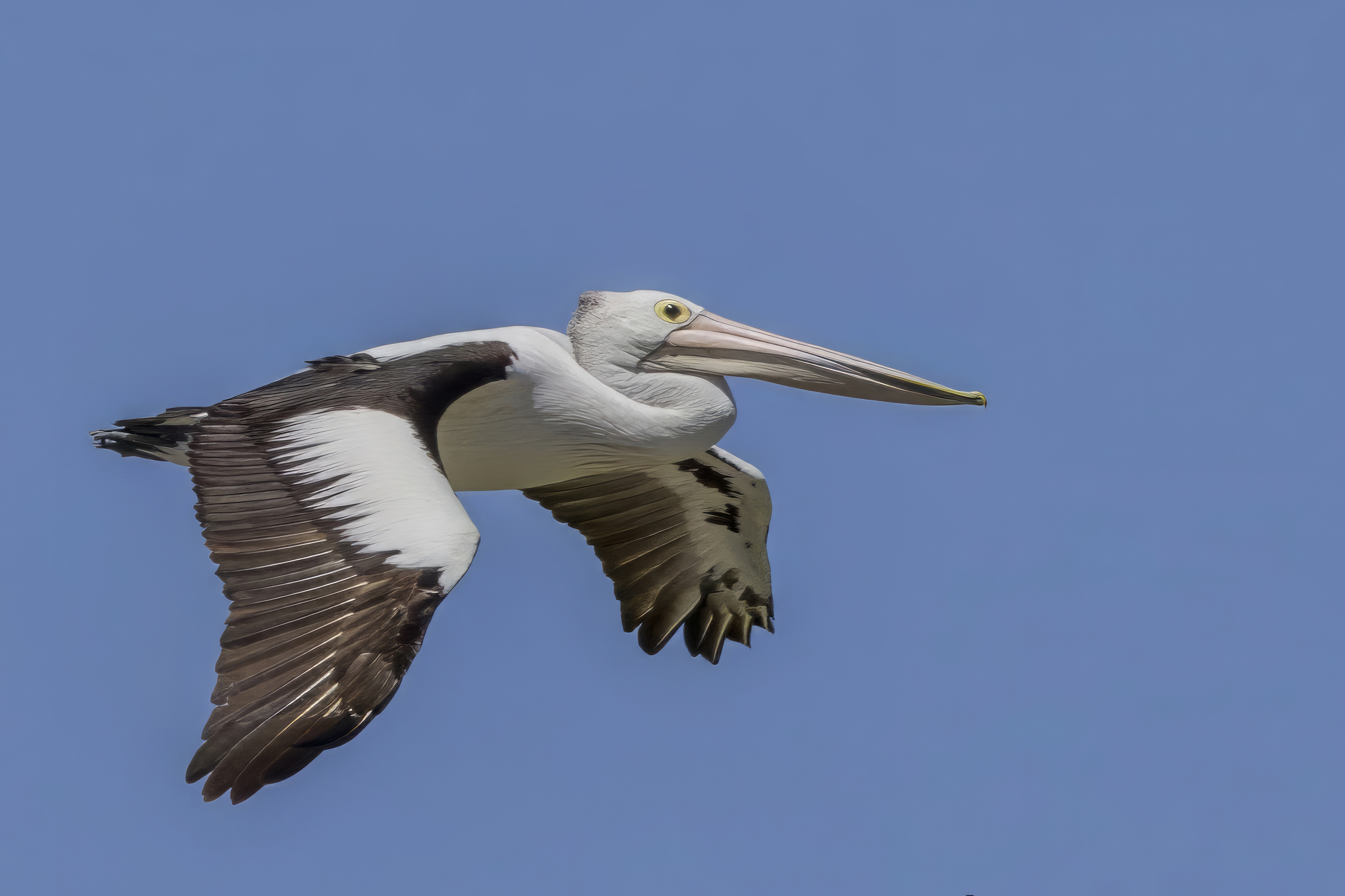

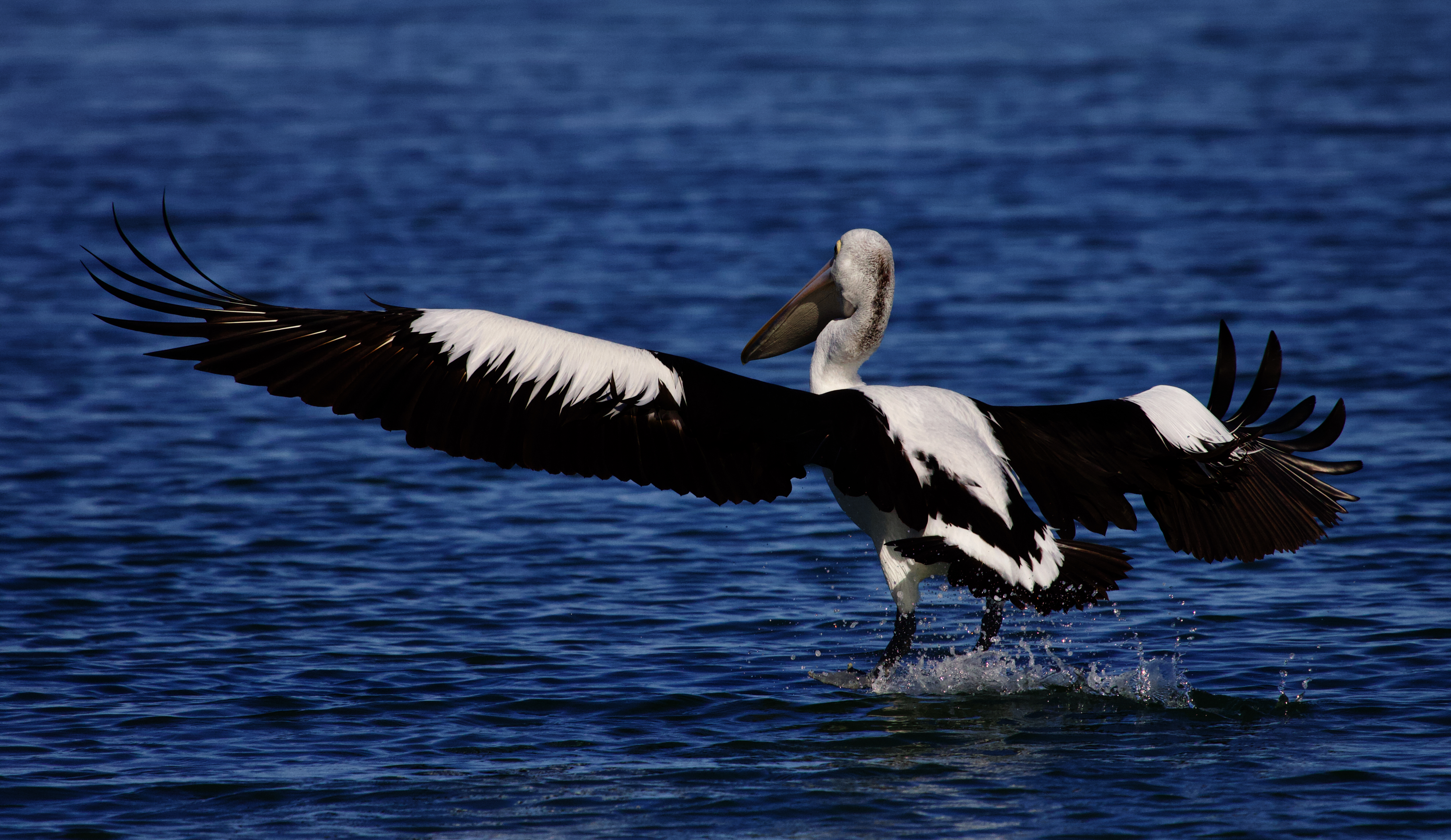

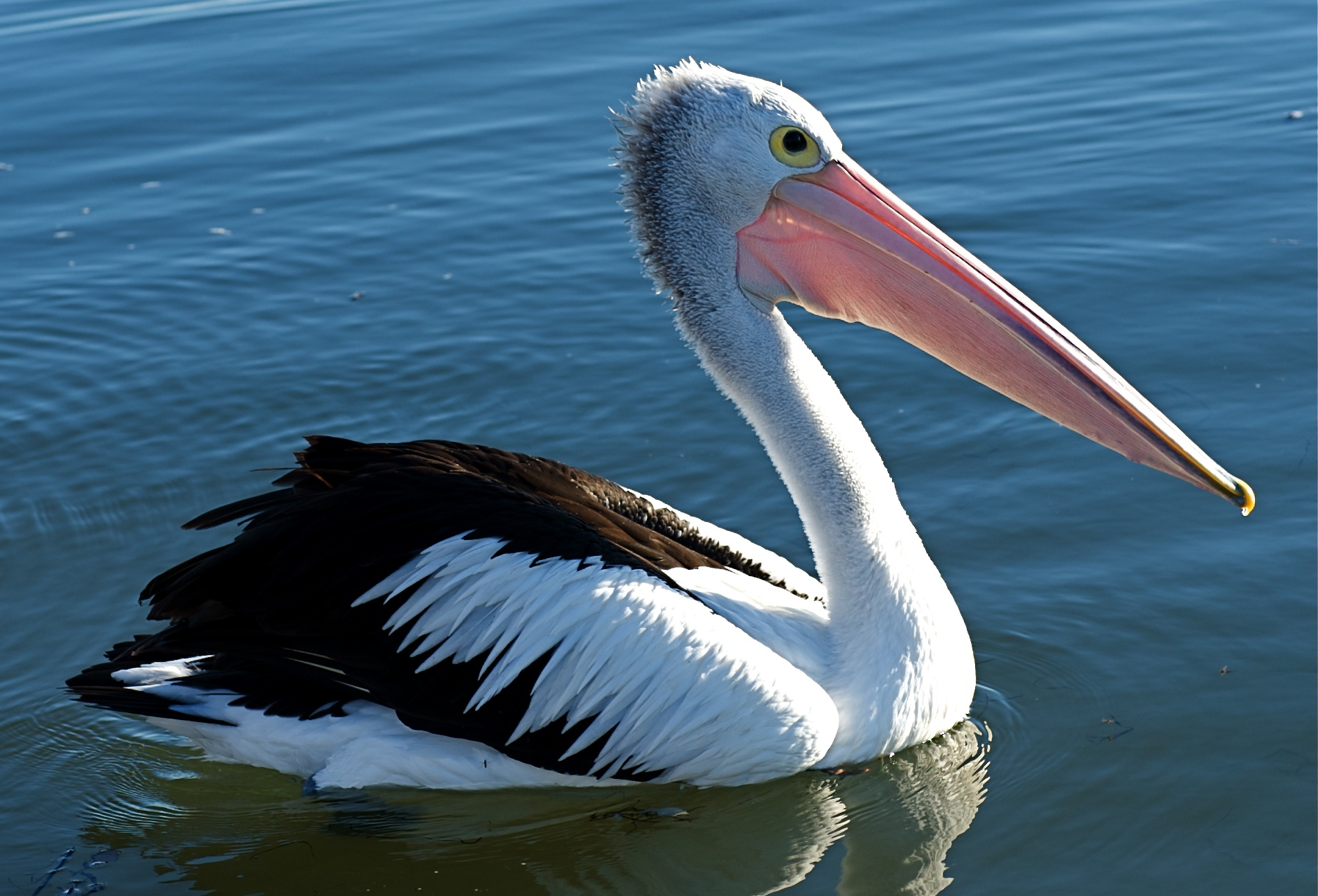

== Distribution and habitat ==
This species can occur in large expanses of mainland Australia and Tasmania. Australian pelicans occur primarily in large expanses of open water without dense aquatic vegetation. The habitats that can support them include large lakes, reservoirs, billabongs and rivers, as well as estuaries, swamps, temporarily flooded areas in arid zones, drainage channels in farmland, salt evaporation ponds and coastal lagoons. The surrounding environment is unimportant: it can be forest, grassland, desert, estuarine mudflats, an ornamental city park, or industrial wasteland, provided only that there is open water able to support a sufficient supply of food. However, they do seem to prefer areas where disturbance is relatively low while breeding. They may also roost on mudflats, sandbars, beaches, reefs, jetties and pilings.

The species became first known to occur in New Zealand from a specimen shot at Jerusalem in 1890 and small numbers of subfossil bones, the first found at Lake Grassmere in 1947, followed by records of other stray individuals. The bones were later described as a new (sub)species, Pelecanus (conspicillatus) novaezealandiae (Scarlett, 1966: "New Zealand pelican") as they appeared to be larger, but Worthy (1998), reviewing new material, determined that they were not separable from the Australian population. These fossils were first found in 1930.

Australian pelicans follow no particular schedule of regular movement, simply following the availability of food supplies. Drought frequently precedes movements. When the normally barren Lake Eyre filled during 1974 to 1976, for example, only a handful of pelicans remained around the coastal cities: when the great inland lakes dried again, the population dispersed once more, flocks of thousands being seen on the northern coasts. On some occasions, they are simply blown by the wind to new locations. It is a fairly regular visitor to the southern coast of New Guinea, as well as the Bismarck Islands and Solomon Islands. It occurs as a vagrant to Christmas Island, Vanuatu, Fiji, Palau and New Zealand. A population irruption occurred in 1978 into Indonesia, with Australian pelicans reaching Sulawesi, Java and possibly also Sumatra.

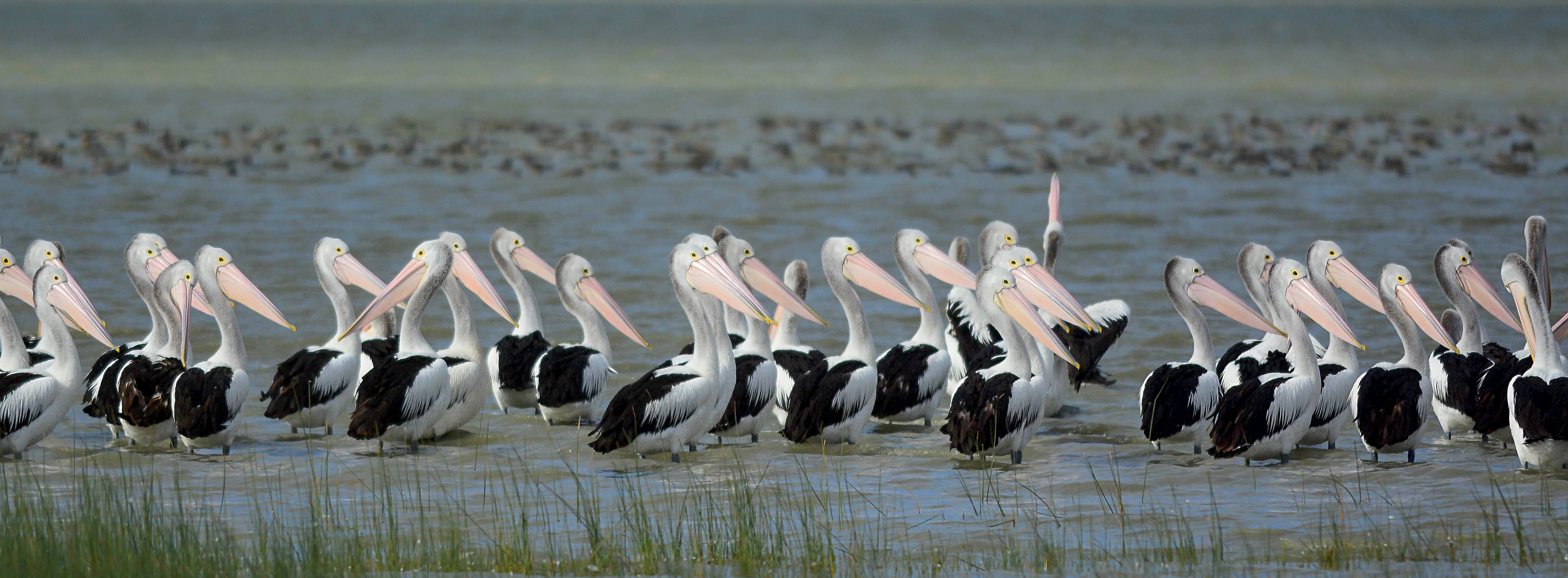
A flock of Australian pelicans

== Feeding ==
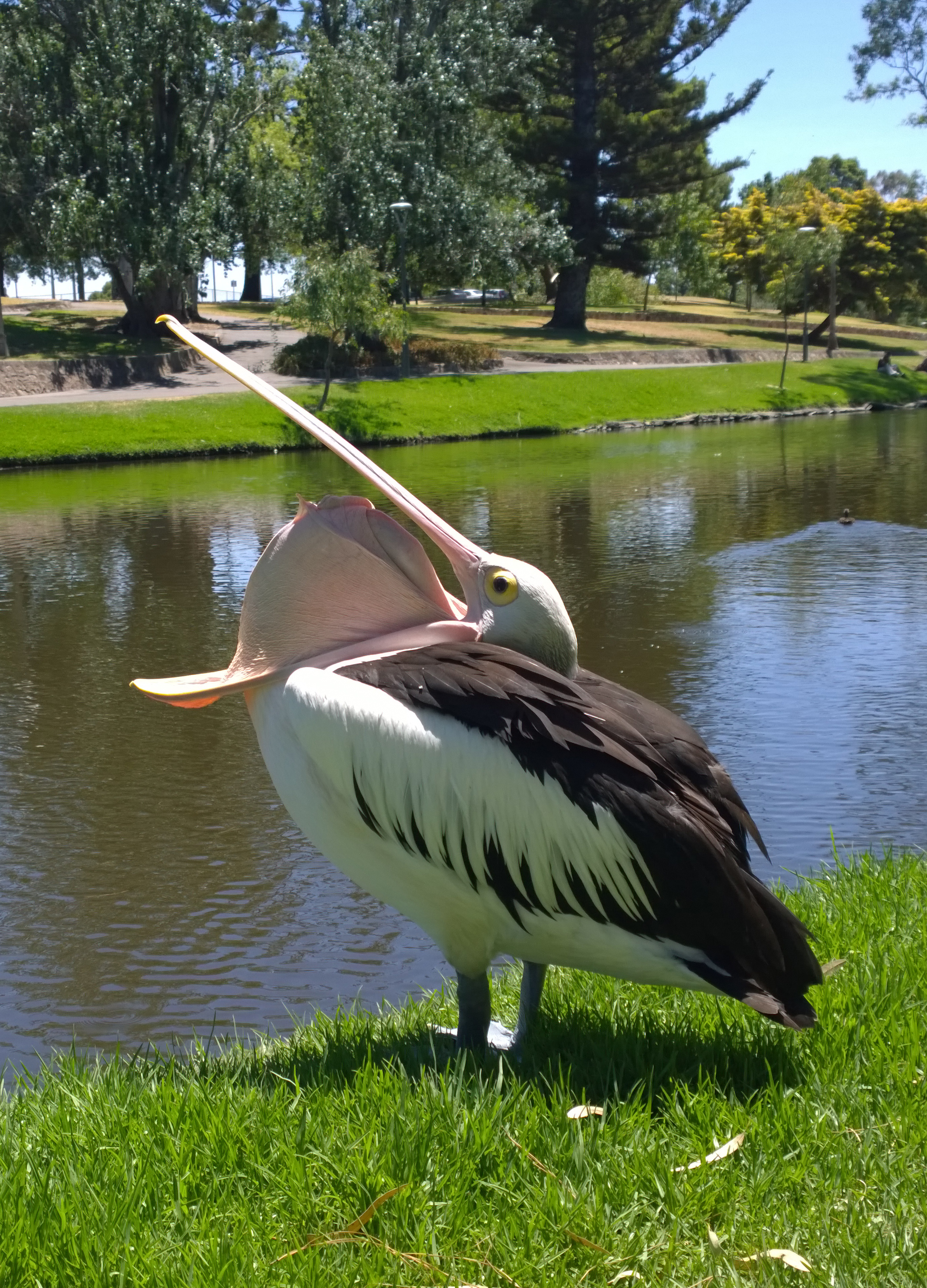
Pelican showing length of beak and size of pouch

Australian pelicans feed by plunge-diving while swimming on the surface of the water. They work in groups to drive fish to shallower water, where they stick their sensitive bills in to snatch their prey. Some feeding grounds in large bodies of water have included up to 1,900 individual birds. They will sometimes also forage solitarily. Their predominant prey is fish and they commonly feed on introduced species such as goldfish, European carp and European perch. When possible, they also eat native fish, with a seeming preference for the perch Leiopotherapon unicolor. However, the Australian pelican seems to be less of a piscivore and less picky in taste than other pelicans. It regularly feeds on insects and many aquatic crustaceans, especially the common yabby, prawns and the shrimps in the genus Macrobrachium. This pelican also takes other birds with some frequency, such as silver gulls, Australian white ibis and grey teal, including eggs, nestlings, fledglings and adults, which they may kill by pinning them underwater and drowning them. Reptiles, amphibians and small mammals are also taken when available. Reportedly even small dogs have been swallowed. The Australian pelican is an occasional kleptoparasite of other water birds, such as cormorants. Cannibalism of young pelicans has also been reported.

== Breeding ==
The Australian pelican begins breeding at two or three years of age. The breeding season varies, occurring in winter in tropical areas (north of 26°S) and spring in parts of southern Australia. Breeding may occur any time after rainfall in inland areas. The nest is a shallow depression in earth or sand, sometimes with some grass lining. Grassy platforms are constructed at Lake Alexandrina in South Australia. Rarely, slightly more elaborate nests have also been observed on top of Muehlenbeckia florulenta bushes. Nesting is communal, with colonies located on islands (such as the North Peron Island) or sheltered areas in the vicinity of lakes or the sea. Breeding Australian pelicans will lay one to four (typically two) chalky-white eggs measuring 93 mm × 57 mm (3.7 in × 2.2 in), which often appear scratched and dirty. The eggs are incubated for 32 to 35 days. The chicks are naked when they hatch, though quickly grow grey down feathers. After they hatch, the larger one will be fed more, and the smaller one will eventually die of starvation or siblicide. For the first two weeks the chicks will be fed regurgitated liquid, but for the remaining two months they will be fed fish and some invertebrates. Feeding pods are formed within colonies when the chicks are around 25 days. The young pelicans fledge at around three months of age.

== Status ==
The Australian pelican is not globally threatened. They are usually fairly common in proper habitats. At the aforementioned temporary inundation of Lake Eyre in March 1990, over 200,000 adult birds were found to be breeding. The species is legally protected and does not seem to be showing any immediate adverse effects from pollution.

In several areas, such as the beach at Monkey Mia, Western Australia and at The Entrance, New South Wales, pelicans may associate with humans and may even beg for hand-outs, but they are quite sensitive to human disturbances while nesting. They will readily adapt to artificial bodies of water such as reservoirs so long as there is no regular boating in them. Due to the popularity of open water sports, the habitat of the Australian pelican has suffered considerably less than more vegetated wetlands throughout Australia. The Australian pelican is evaluated as a least-concern species on the IUCN Red List of Threatened Species.

== Local names ==
In parts of South Australia the pelican is known by its Ngarrindjeri name, nori. It was the totem of singer Ruby Hunter.

== Gallery ==
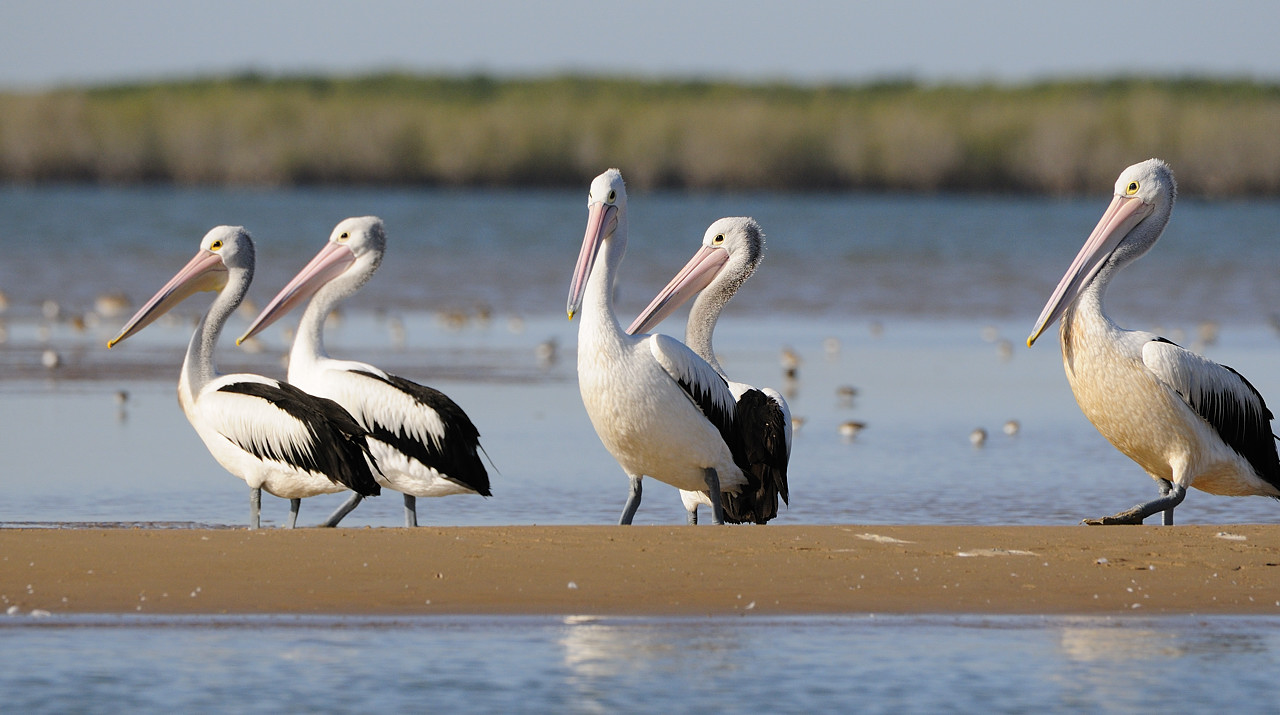
Some Australian pelicans at the mouth of the McArthur River

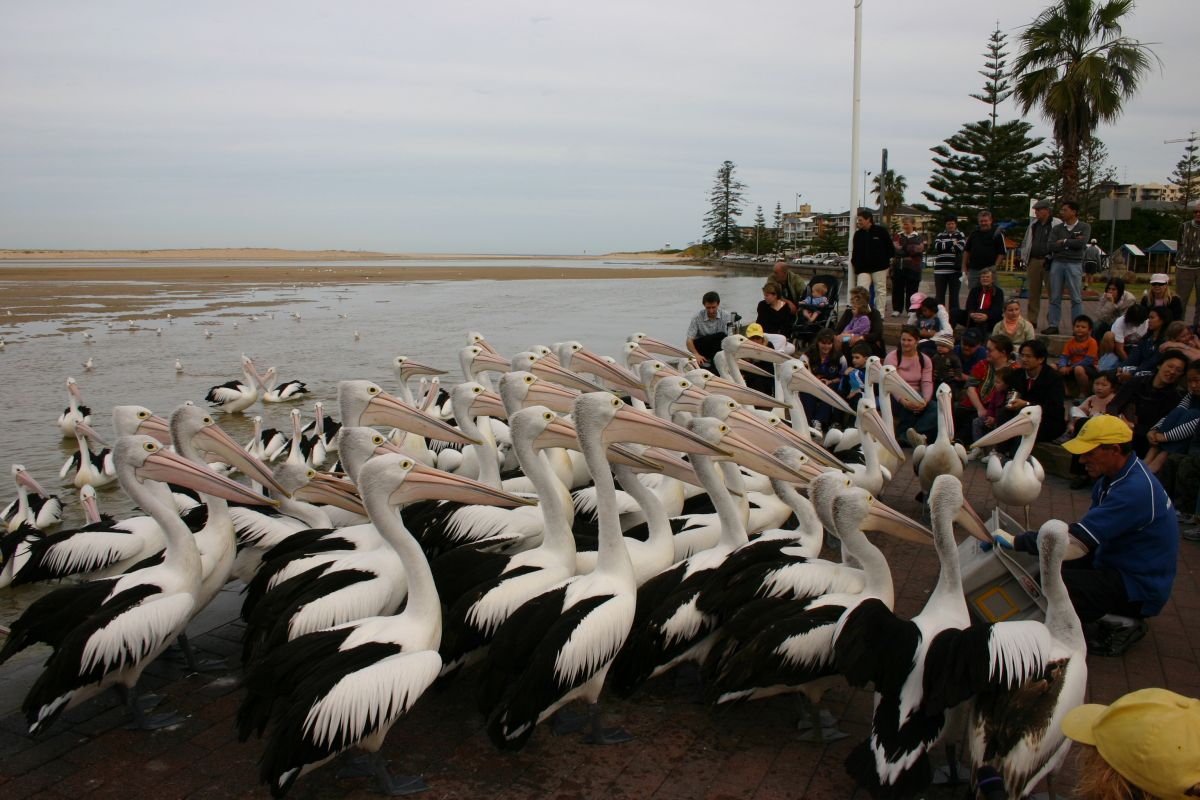
Artificial feeding at The Entrance, New South Wales

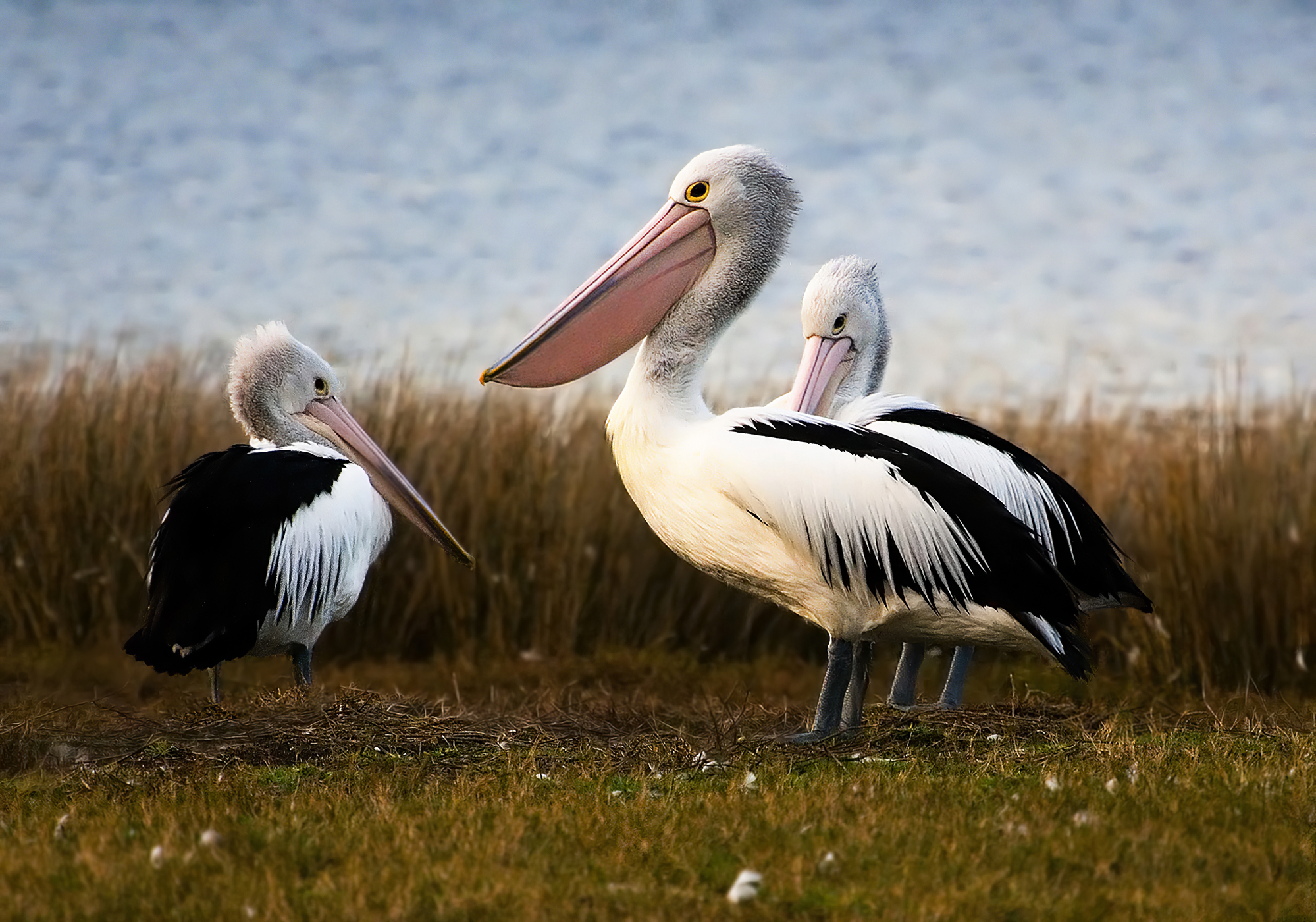
Three Australian pelicans resting

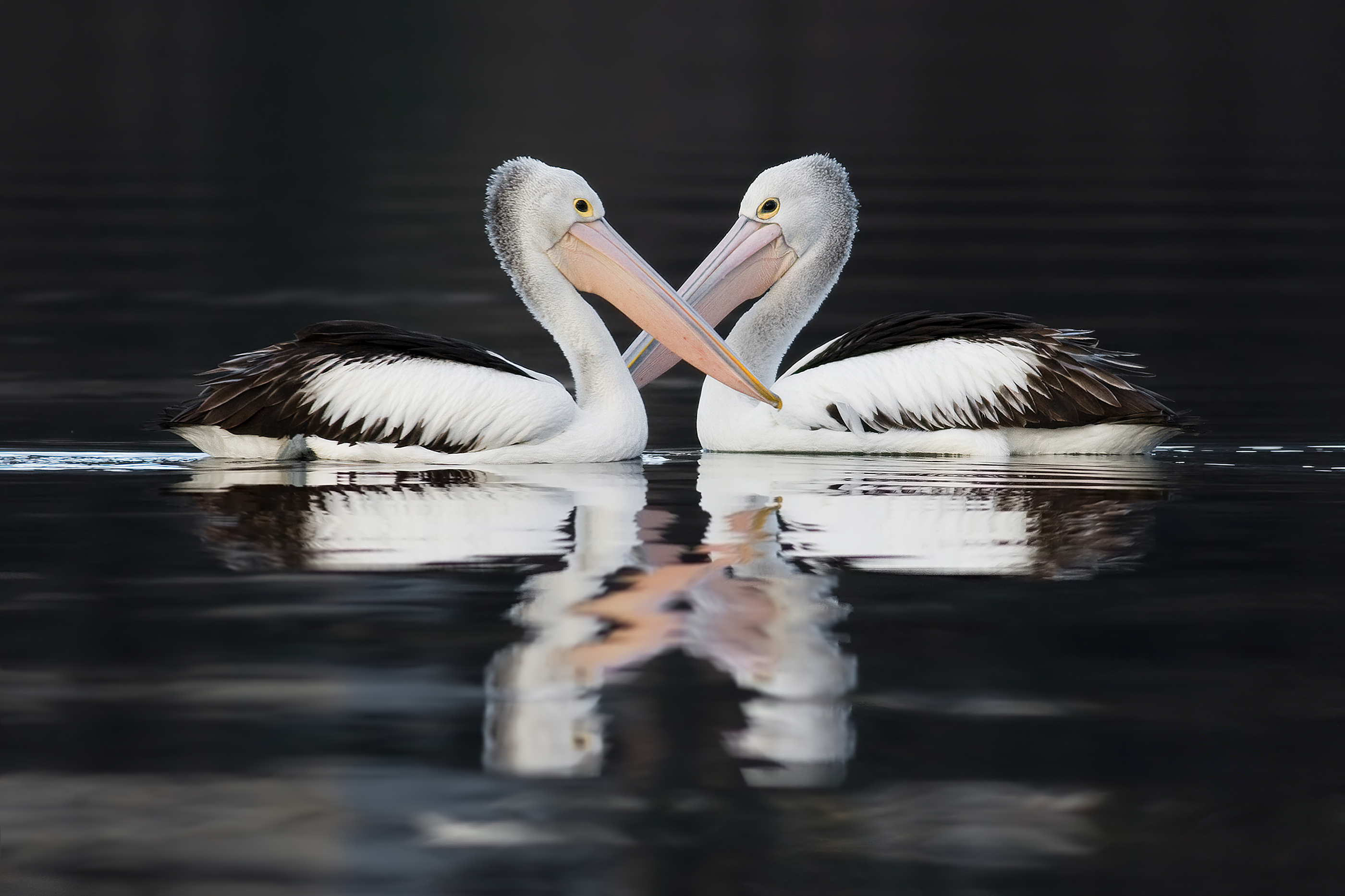
Swimming pair, Claremont, Tasmania, Australia

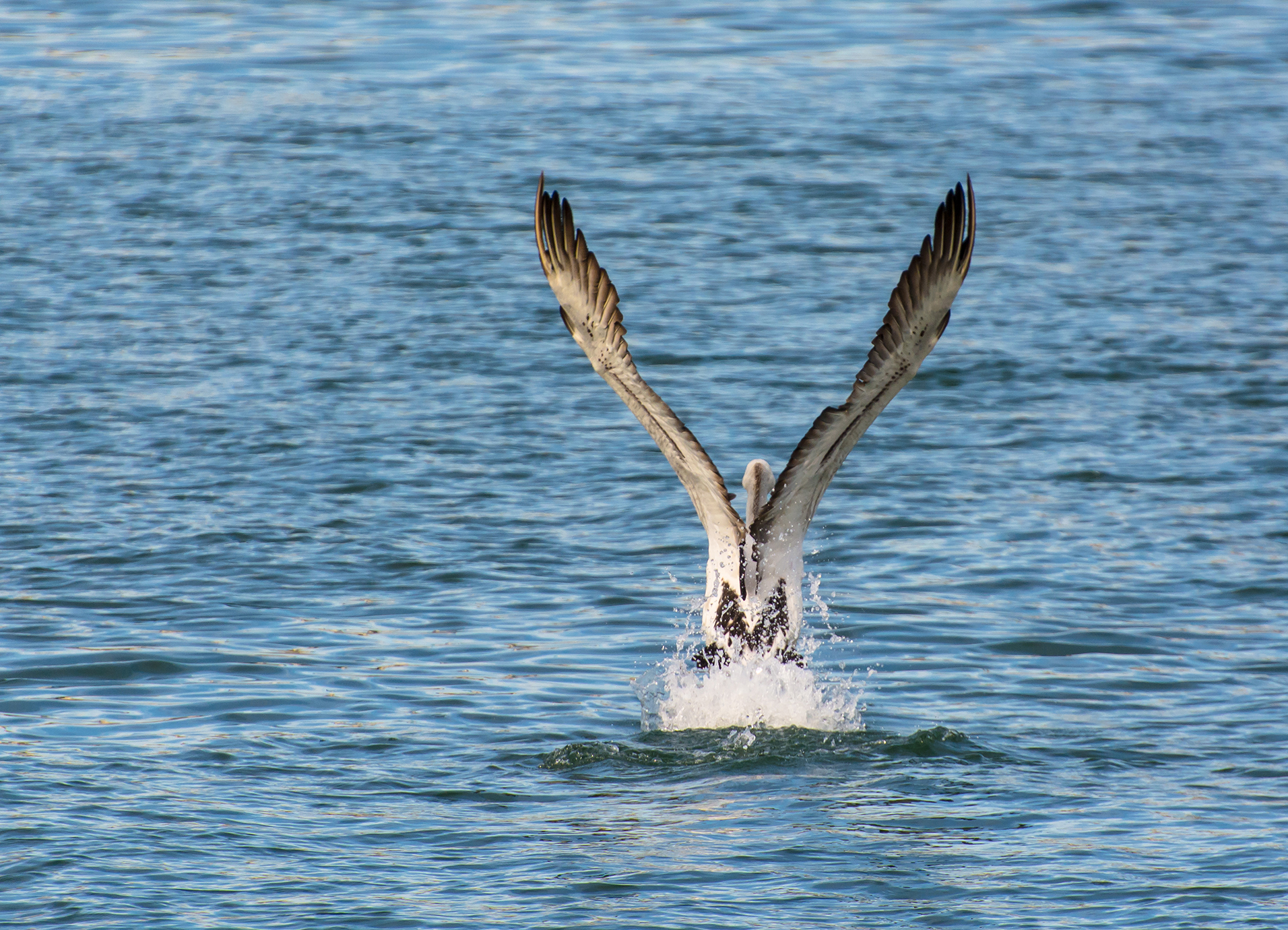
Australian pelican taking off in Blackwattle Bay, Sydney New South Wales
