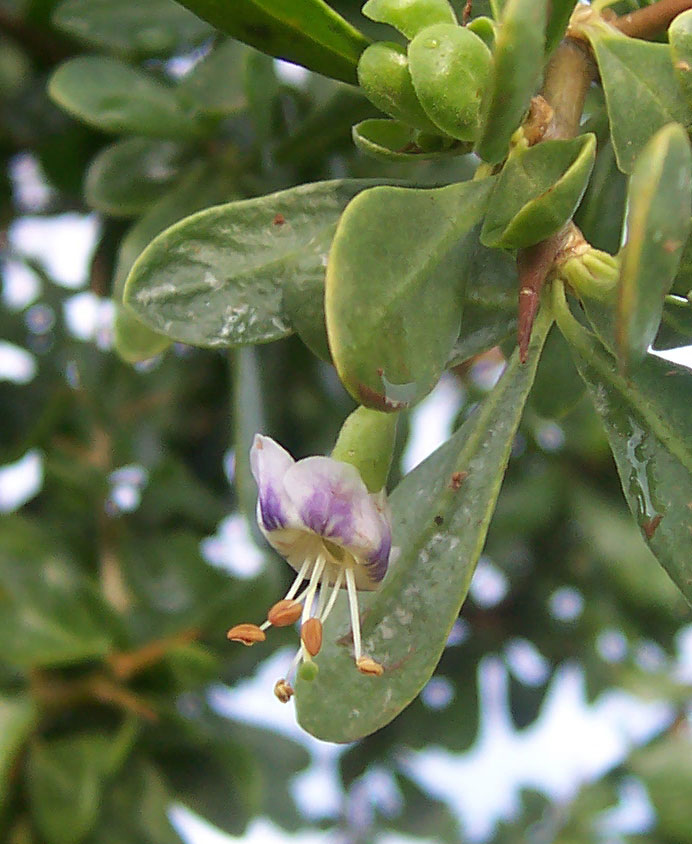

Scientific classification
- Kingdom: Plantae
- Clade: Tracheophytes
- Clade: Angiosperms
- Clade: Eudicots
- Clade: Asterids
- Order: Solanales
- Family: Solanaceae
- Genus: Lycium
- Species: L. ferocissimum

Binomial name
- Lycium ferocissimum Miers

Synonyms
- Heterotypic Synonyms: Lycium campanulatum E.Mey. ex C.H.Wright; Lycium macrocalyx Domin; Lycium macrocalyx Dammer

= Lycium ferocissimum =

African boxthorn

Species of shrub

Lycium ferocissimum is a species of flowering plants in the nightshade family, Solanaceae. It is sometimes referred to by the common names African boxthorn, boxthorn, and snake-berry. This shrub is native to Cape Provinces, Free State, and Lesotho.

== Distribution ==
The species is native to the Western Cape and Eastern Cape provinces in South Africa, where it tends to occur in sands along the southern coast. It has also been recorded in the Free State, but these may represent introductions. It has been widely introduced in South Africa and elsewhere in Africa, as far north as Morocco. It has been recorded in Sardinia, Italy. This shrub is found in other Mediterranean countries such as Tunisia and Spain. There is one record in France from 2020.

It has become naturalised in Australia and New Zealand. It is listed in Australia's Weed of National Significance list and is a declared noxious weed in the United States.

== Description ==
African boxthorn is a large shrub which grows up to 5 metres (16 ft) high and is covered in spines. The spines are of randomly varying lengths along the branch and, unlike most other species of Lycium (except for Lycium amoenum), they take the form of stout "peg-thorns".

The leaves are oval in shape and are 10–40 millimetres (0.39–1.57 in) long and 4–10 millimetres (0.16–0.39 in) in width. The broadly obovate or elliptical shape of the leaves can serve to distinguish this species from many other similar species of Lycium, which tend to have narrower leaves.

The solitary flowers emerge from the leaf axils. The corolla is funnel-shaped with large, reflexed, pale purple lobes (petals). The calyx is tubular and encloses most of the corolla (a character shared with Lycium pumilum). This latter character, the calyx that is at least two thirds of the length of the corolla, serves to distinguish this species from many of its relatives.

The species was first formally described in 1854 by British botanist John Miers in the Annals and Magazine of Natural History. His description was based on plant material collected from Uitenhage in South Africa.

== Habitat and ecology ==
This species grows on dry, stony and/or sandy terrain, such as sand dunes, cliffs, banks and roadsides. Its seeds are dispersed by small mammals and birds, which eat the red berries of this plant.

== Lycium ferocissimum in Cyprus ==
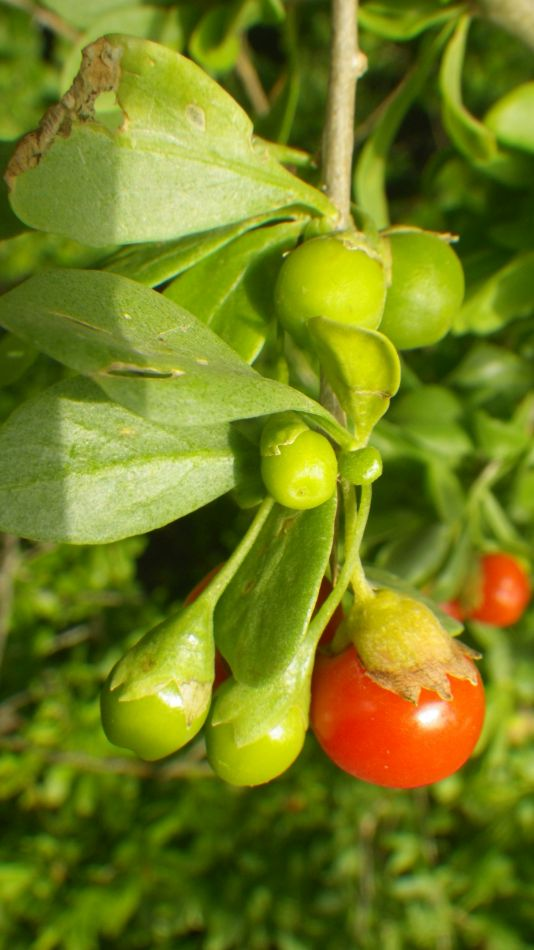
Lycium ferocissimum fruit in Cyprus

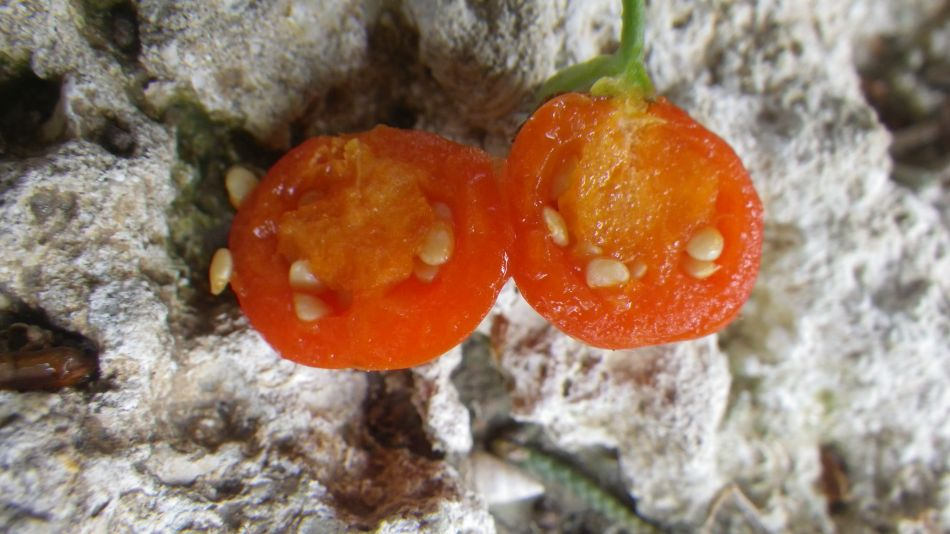
Lycium ferocissimum Cyprus fruit inside view

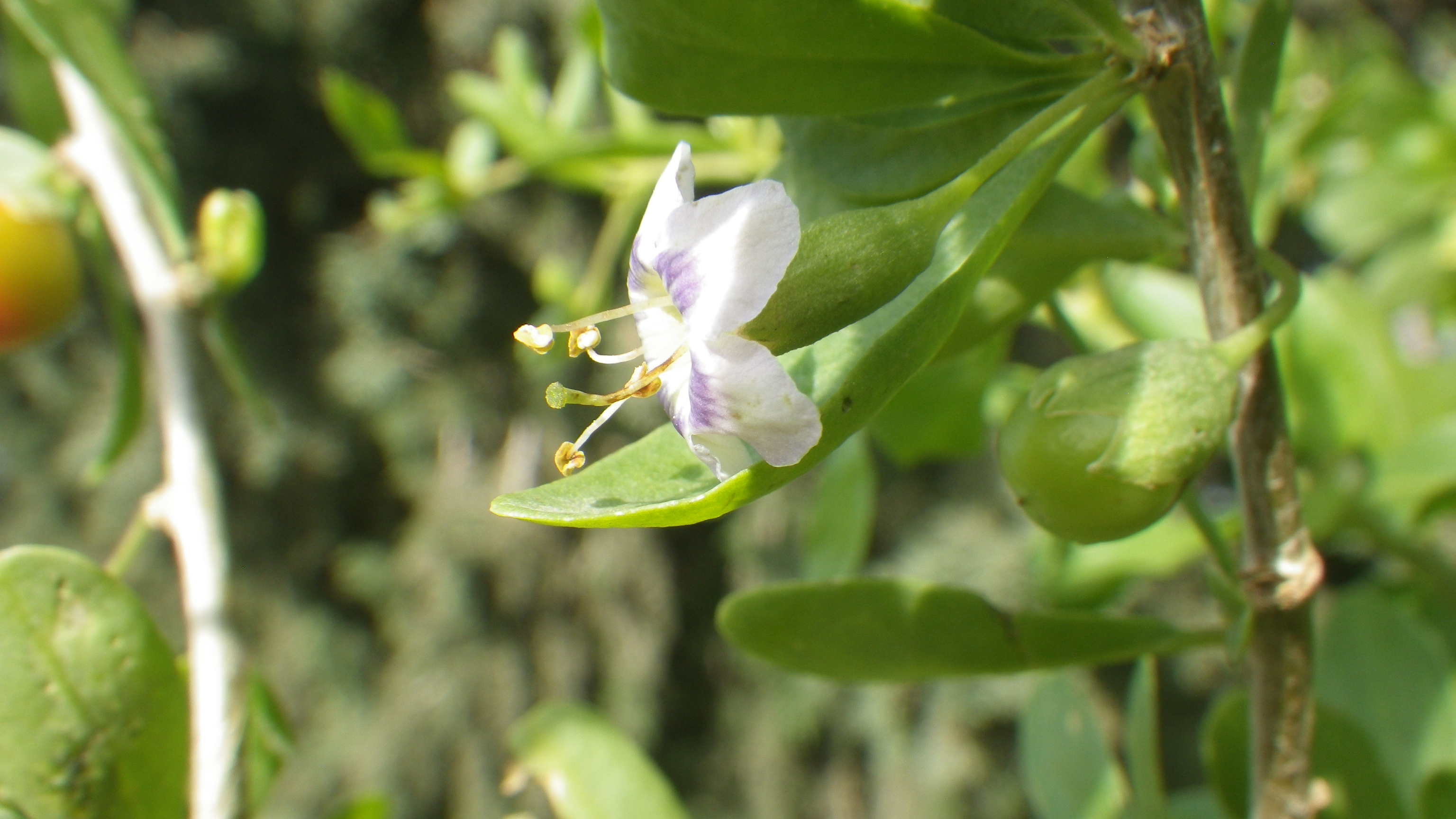
Lycium ferocissimum flower in Cyprus
