= C. spinosum =

C. spinosum may refer to:

- Canthium spinosum, a flowering plant species in the genus Canthium
- Citharexylum spinosum, the spiny fiddlewood, a flowering plant species in the genus Citharexylum
- Crucibulum spinosum, the spiny cup-and-saucer snail, a sea snail species native to the west coast of the Americas, from California to Chile

== Synonyms ==
- Catasetum spinosum, a synonym for Catasetum barbatum, the bearded catasetum, an orchid species
- Chamaeleo spinosum, a synonym for Rhampholeon spinosus, the rosette-nosed chameleon, a small East African lizard species

== See also ==
- Spinosum
