= Crucibulum =

Cruscibulum is the scientific name of two genera of organisms and may refer to:

- Crucibulum (fungus), a genus of fungi in the family Nidulariaceae
- Crucibulum (gastropod), a genus of molluscs in the family Calyptraeidae
