= Epicorsia oedipodalis =

Scientific classification
- Kingdom: Animalia
- Phylum: Arthropoda
- Class: Insecta
- Order: Lepidoptera
- Family: Crambidae
- Genus: Epicorsia
- Species: E. oedipodalis

Binomial name
- Epicorsia oedipodalis (Guenée, 1854)

Synonyms
- Botys oedipodalis Guenée, 1854; Botys butyrosa Butler, 1878

Species of moth

Epicorsia oedipodalis is a moth in the family Crambidae. It was described by Achille Guenée in 1854. It is found on Jamaica, Haiti, Cuba, the Cayman Islands, the Bahamas and in the US states of Florida and Georgia.

The wingspan is about 38 mm. Adults are on wing from February to May and from August to December in the southern United States.

The larvae feed on Citharexylum, Coccolobis and Nectandra coriacea.
