= Berlandieri =

Berlandieri, a word referring to French naturalist Jean-Louis Berlandier (1803 – 1851), may refer to:

- Senegalia berlandieri, a species of shrub
- Gopherus berlandieri or the Texas tortoise
- Lycium berlandieri, a species of plant in the nightshade family
- Rana berlandieri or Rio Grande leopard frog
- Vitis berlandieri, a species of grape

== See also ==
- C. berlandieri (disambiguation)
