= C. berlandieri =

C. berlandieri may refer to:

- Chenopodium berlandieri, a species of plant in the family Amaranthaceae
- Citharexylum berlandieri, a species of plant in the family Verbenaceae

== See also ==
- Berlandieri (disambiguation)
