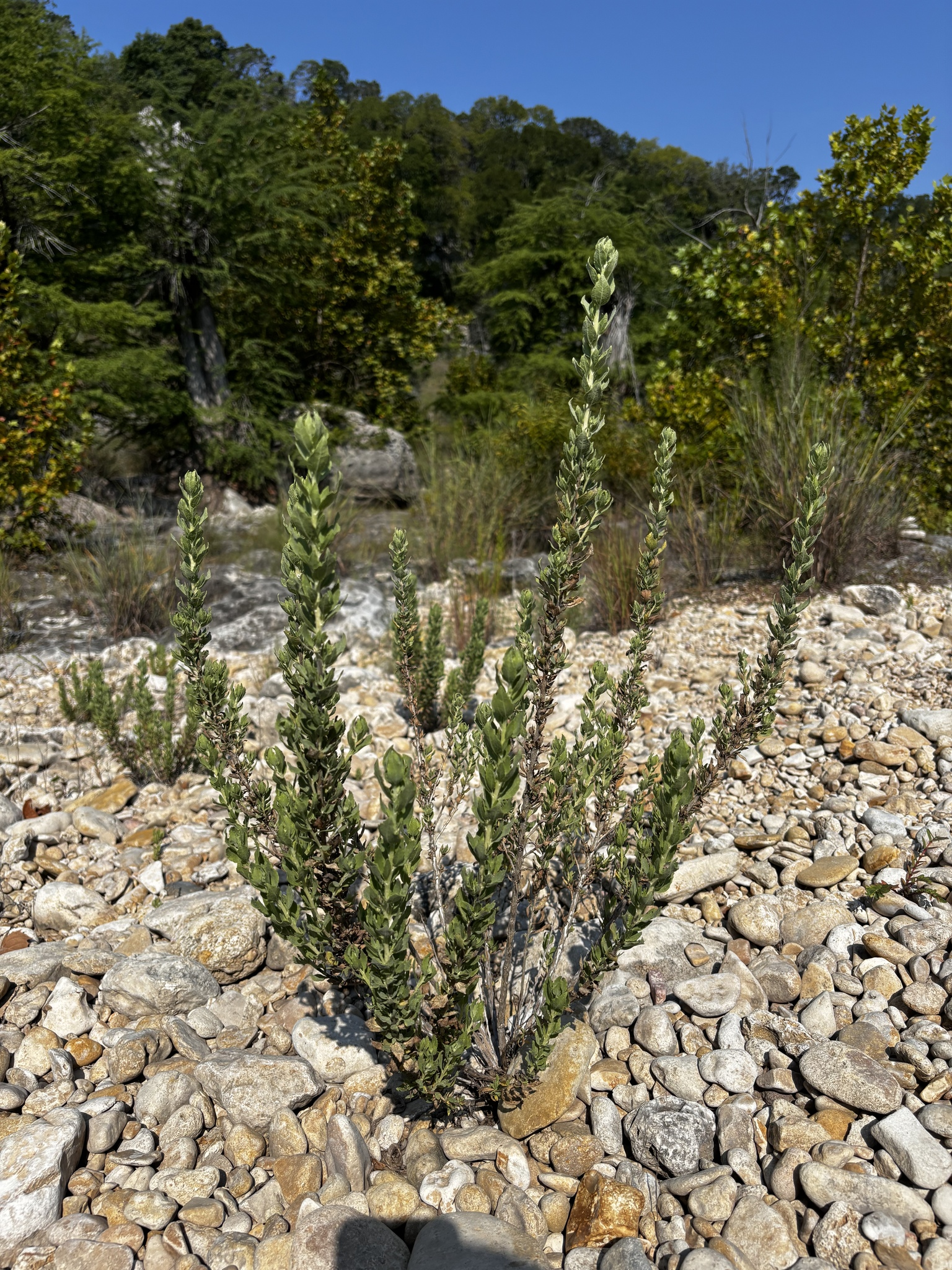

Conservation status
- Vulnerable (NatureServe)

Scientific classification
- Kingdom: Plantae
- Clade: Embryophytes
- Clade: Tracheophytes
- Clade: Spermatophytes
- Clade: Angiosperms
- Clade: Eudicots
- Clade: Asterids
- Order: Asterales
- Family: Asteraceae
- Genus: Brickellia
- Species: B. dentata

Binomial name
- Brickellia dentata (DC.) Sch.Bip.

Synonyms
- Brickellia riddellii (Torr. & A.Gray) A.Gray; Clavigera dentata DC. 1836; Clavigera riddellii Torr. & A.Gray; Coleosanthus dentatus (DC.) Kuntze; Coleosanthus riddellii (Torr. & A.Gray) Kuntze ex Small

= Brickellia dentata =

Species of flowering plant

Brickellia dentata, known as the leafy or gravelbar brickellbush, is a rare North American species of flowering plants in the family Asteraceae. It has been found only in Texas in the south-central United States.

== Description ==
Brickellia dentata is a branching shrub sometimes growing up to 120 cm tall (4 feet). Its stems are covered with soft hairs, and sparse glands which appear as dots. Sharp-pointed leaves are up to 40 mm (1.6 in) long and 12 mm (0.47 in) wide. Their blades are widest at their middles but sometimes tend to be egg-shaped; they arise singly along the stems. The blades are obscurely 3-nerved from their bases and their margins usually are coarsely toothed, but sometimes there are no teeth at all.

Flowering heads are arranged in narrow, panicle-type inflorescences. In individual flowering heads, 13-20 reduced flowers, or florets, have cylindrical, pale green to yellow corollas up to 6.5 mm (0.26 in) long. Florets arise from inside a cylindrical, greenish to straw-colored structure, an involucre, composed of 5-6 series of overlapping bracts of unequal size. The back of each bract bears 3-5 slender, greenish lines running its length, and bracts are hairy and glandular. The mature, cypsela-type fruits are up to 4 mm (0.16 in) long, sparsely hairy, and each cypsela is topped with 30-35 light brown to brownish-orange bristles composing the pappus; bristle tips may be a little enlarged, and sometimes the bristles have tiny projections along their sides like a feather's barbules.

== Distribution ==
Brickellia dentata is endemic just to the U.S. state of Texas. On the iNaturalist page documenting observations of Brickellia dentata by citizen scientists it's seen that within Texas it occurs only in the hilly southwestern part. This hilly region is known as the Edwards Plateau; by ecologists it is regarded as the Central Texas Area of Endemism, and Brickellia dentata within this relatively small area is one of three edaphic endemic species.

== Habitat ==
Brickellia dentata essentially is restricted to frequently-scoured, gravelly alluvial beds in creek and river bottoms. This habitat is maintained by violent flooding which scours stream bottoms, periodically removing young woody vegetation. It is thought that if natural flooding were prevented the species could be replaced by woody vegetation. The habitat is referred to as "Edwards Plateau riverscour habitat." This hilly region is known as the Edwards Plateau, and may be thought of as the "Central Texas Area of Endemism."

On this page an individual is illustrated growing on a rocky slope immediately above a roadcut about 20m (~20 yards) from an occasionally flooded stream.

== Conservation status ==
Brickellia dentata is rated as "G3 Vulnerable" to extinction. In 2015 the reason for its vulnerability was given as the limited area in which the species occurred, known from fewer than 25 occurrences, and the threat that by preventing natural flooding of its habitat it could be replaced with woody vegetation.

Efforts to maintain populations of this species may benefit from knowing that the seeds have no fixed dormancy period; they simply germinate when temperature and soil moisture conditions are favorable for germination and seedling establishment.

== Taxonomy ==
In 1836 when Swiss botanist Augustin Pyramus de Candolle described this species, he wrote that his type specimen had been collected by the distinguished Berlandier in the eastern district of the Mexican province of Texas, (Comanche territory), and around Bejar -- "...in Mexicanae prov. Texas distr. (Commancheries) orientalibus necnon circa Bejar legit cl. Berlandier."

== Etymology ==
The genus name Brickellia honors the Irish-born physician and naturalist John Brickell (1748-1809) who settled in Georgia in the USA.

The species name dentata is from the New Latin dentatus, meaning "toothed, having teeth", apparently referring to the leaves' toothed margins.

== Gallery ==
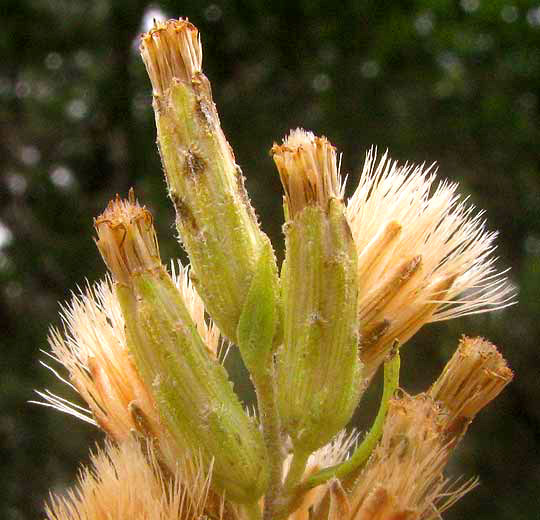
Brickellia dentata flowering and fruiting heads

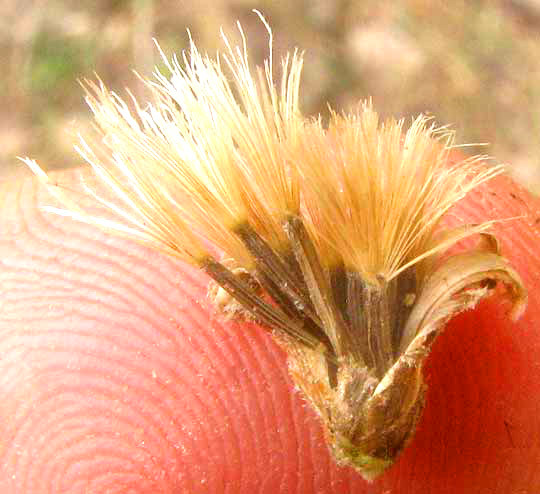
Brickellia dentata fruiting head showing cypselae topped with bristles

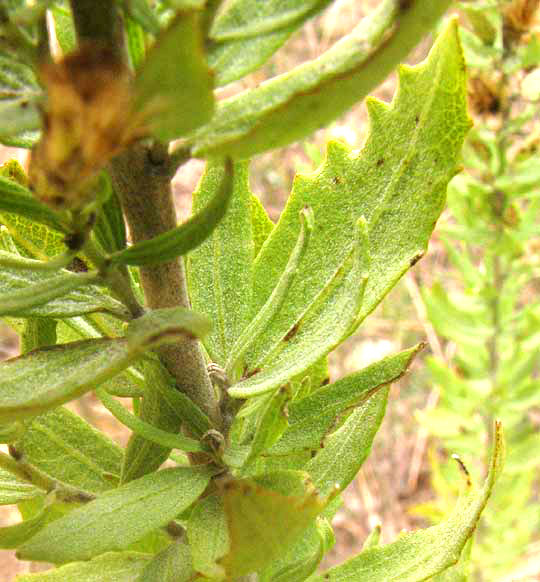
Brickellia dentata stem and leaves with toothed margins

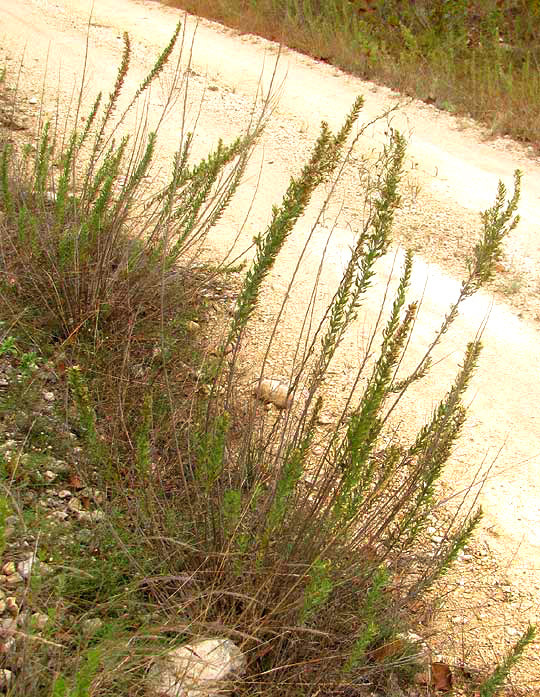
Brickellia dentata growing on steep, rocky slope above roadcut
