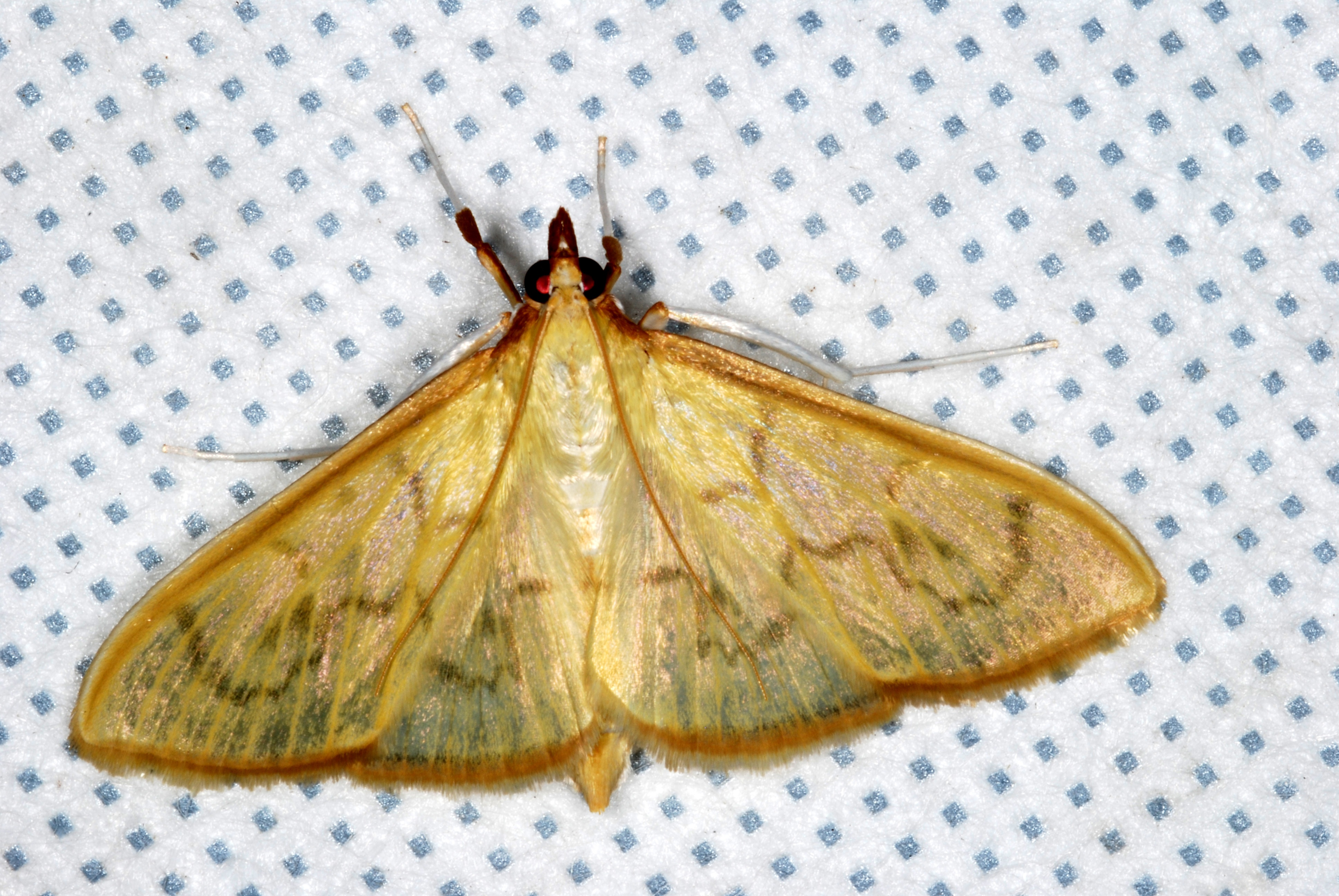

Scientific classification
- Kingdom: Animalia
- Phylum: Arthropoda
- Class: Insecta
- Order: Lepidoptera
- Family: Crambidae
- Subfamily: Pyraustinae
- Genus: Epicorsia; Hübner, 1818

Synonyms
- Episcorsia Hübner, 1826

= Epicorsia =

Genus of moths

Epicorsia is a genus of moths of the family Crambidae.

== Species ==
- Epicorsia avilalis
- Epicorsia catarinalis
- Epicorsia cerata
- Epicorsia chiapalis
- Epicorsia chicalis Munroe, 1978
- Epicorsia lucialis
- Epicorsia mellinalis Hübner, 1818
- Epicorsia oedipodalis (Guenée, 1854)
- Epicorsia parambalis
