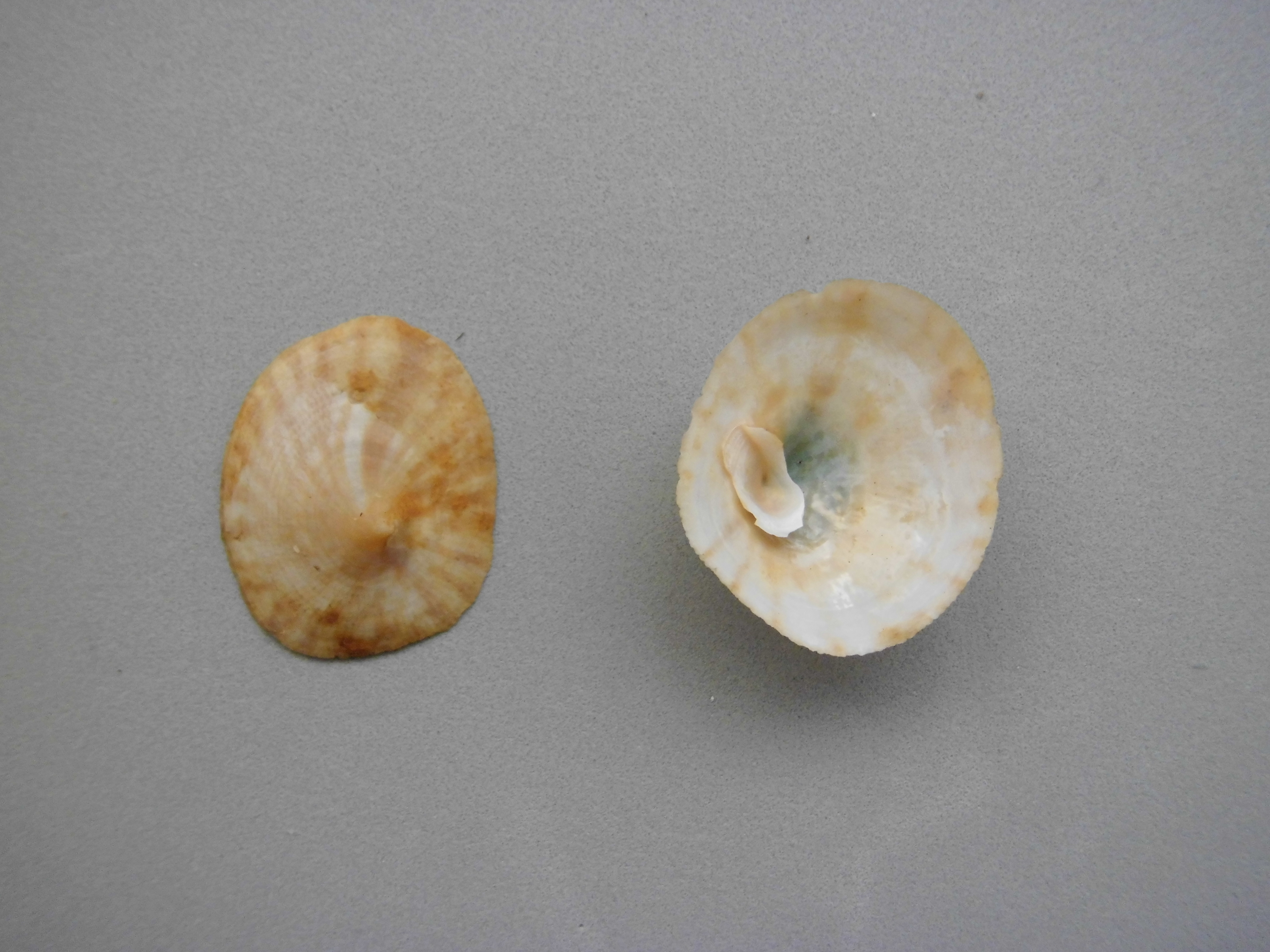

Scientific classification
- Kingdom: Animalia
- Phylum: Mollusca
- Class: Gastropoda
- Subclass: Caenogastropoda
- Order: Littorinimorpha
- Family: Calyptraeidae
- Genus: Crucibulum
- Species: C. striatum

Binomial name
- Crucibulum striatum (Say, 1826)

= Crucibulum striatum =

Species of gastropod

Crucibulum striatum, common name the striate cup-and -saucer, is a species of sea snail, a marine gastropod mollusk in the family Calyptraeidae, the slipper snails or slipper limpets, cup-and-saucer snails, and Chinese hat snails.

== Description ==
The maximum recorded shell length is 34 mm.

== Habitat ==
The minimum recorded depth for this species is 0 m; the maximum recorded depth is 422 m.
