= Epicorsia chiapalis =

Scientific classification
- Domain: Eukaryota
- Kingdom: Animalia
- Phylum: Arthropoda
- Class: Insecta
- Order: Lepidoptera
- Family: Crambidae
- Genus: Epicorsia
- Species: E. chiapalis

Binomial name
- Epicorsia chiapalis Munroe, 1958

Species of moth

Epicorsia chiapalis is a moth in the family Crambidae. It is found in Mexico.
