= Epicorsia chicalis =

Scientific classification
- Domain: Eukaryota
- Kingdom: Animalia
- Phylum: Arthropoda
- Class: Insecta
- Order: Lepidoptera
- Family: Crambidae
- Genus: Epicorsia
- Species: E. chicalis

Binomial name
- Epicorsia chicalis Munroe, 1978

Species of moth

Epicorsia chicalis is a moth in the family Crambidae. It was described by Eugene G. Munroe in 1978. It is found in Honduras.
