= Epicorsia cerata =

Scientific classification
- Domain: Eukaryota
- Kingdom: Animalia
- Phylum: Arthropoda
- Class: Insecta
- Order: Lepidoptera
- Family: Crambidae
- Genus: Epicorsia
- Species: E. cerata

Binomial name
- Epicorsia cerata (Fabricius, 1795)

Synonyms
- Phalaena cerata Fabricius, 1795

Species of moth

Epicorsia cerata is a moth in the family Crambidae. It is found on the Lesser Antilles and Cuba.

The larvae have been recorded feeding on Grevillea robusta.
