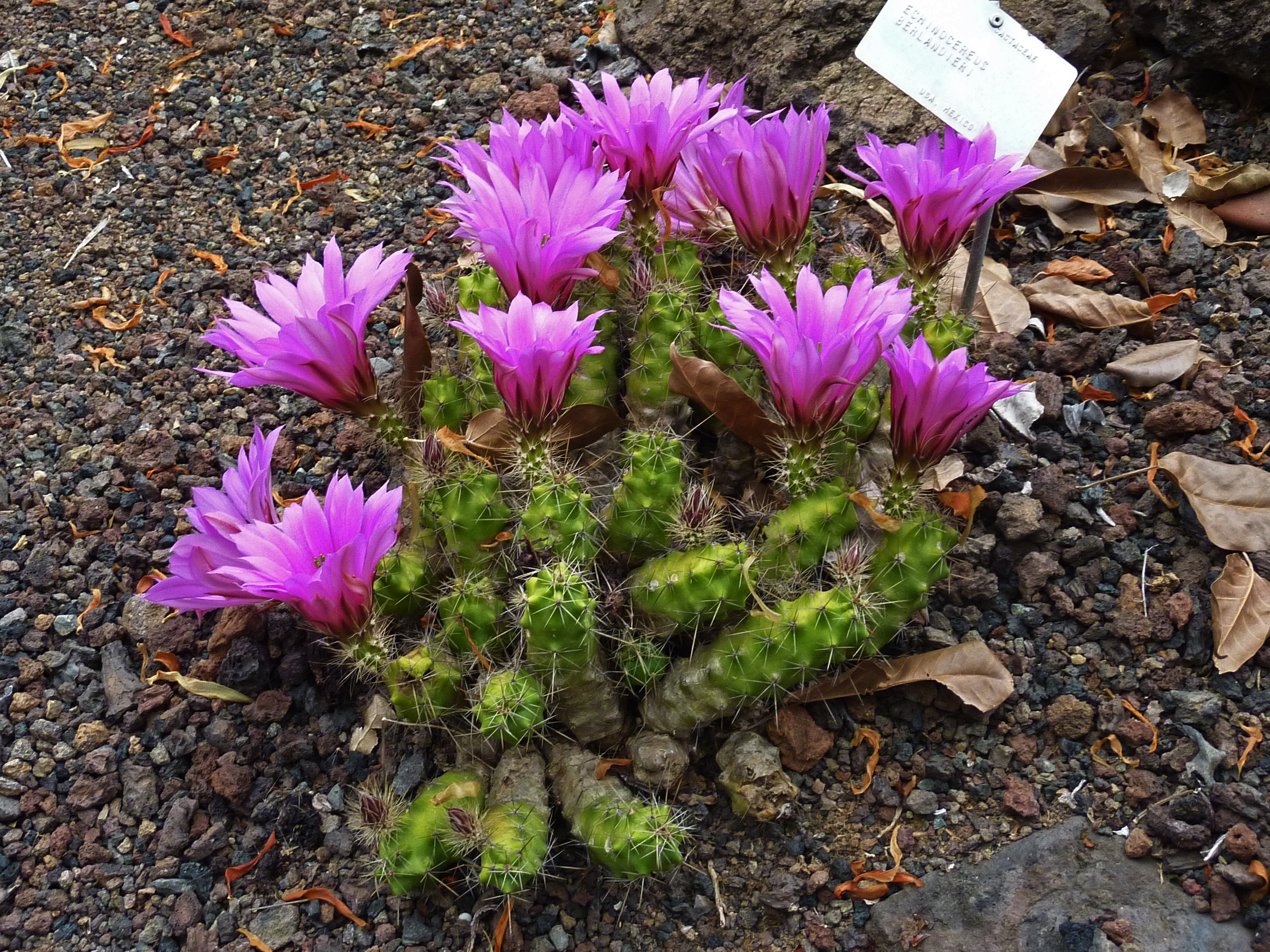

Conservation status
- Least Concern (IUCN 3.1)

Scientific classification
- Kingdom: Plantae
- Clade: Tracheophytes
- Clade: Angiosperms
- Clade: Eudicots
- Order: Caryophyllales
- Family: Cactaceae
- Subfamily: Cactoideae
- Genus: Echinocereus
- Species: E. berlandieri

Binomial name
- Echinocereus berlandieri (Engelm.) Haage

= Echinocereus berlandieri =

Species of cactus

Echinocereus berlandieri (Berlandier's hedgehog cactus) is a species of hedgehog cactus. Its range includes most of South Texas, and is commonly found along the Nueces River and the lower Rio Grande.

== Description ==
Echinocereus berlandieri grows with many shoots and forms groups up to 1 meter in diameter. The dark green to somewhat purple-green, cylindrical shoots that taper towards their base are prostrate or have upright tips. They are 5 to 60 cm (2.0 to 23.6 in) long and reach a diameter of 1.5 to 3 cm (0.59 to 1.18 in). There are five to seven ribs with barely any hint of humps. The one to three strong, outward-facing, yellowish to dark brown central spines are 2.5 to 5 cm (0.98 to 1.97 in) long. The six to nine whitish marginal spines are 1 to 2.5 cm (0.39 to 0.98 in) long.

The broadly funnel-shaped flowers are pink to reddish purple and appear below the tips of the shoots. They are 7 to 8 cm (2.8 to 3.1 in) long and reach a diameter of up to 7 cm (2.8 in). The egg-shaped, green fruits are 2 to 2.5 cm (0.79 to 0.98 in) long. The thorns on it fall off.

== Distribution ==
Echinocereus berlandieri is widespread in the United States in the south of Texas and in the neighboring Mexican states of Nuevo León and Tamaulipas at altitudes of up to 600 meters.

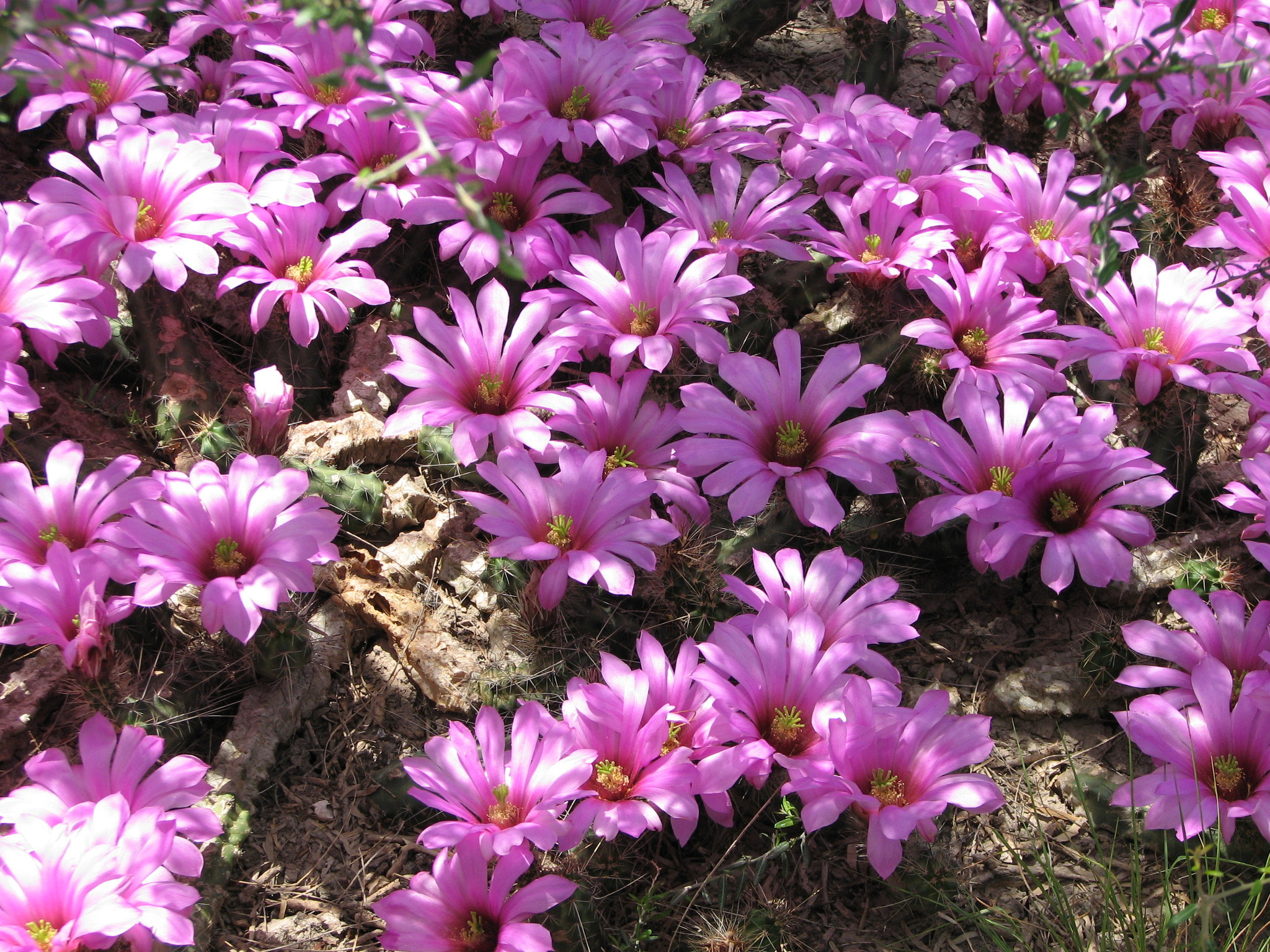
Plants growing in Weslaco, Texas

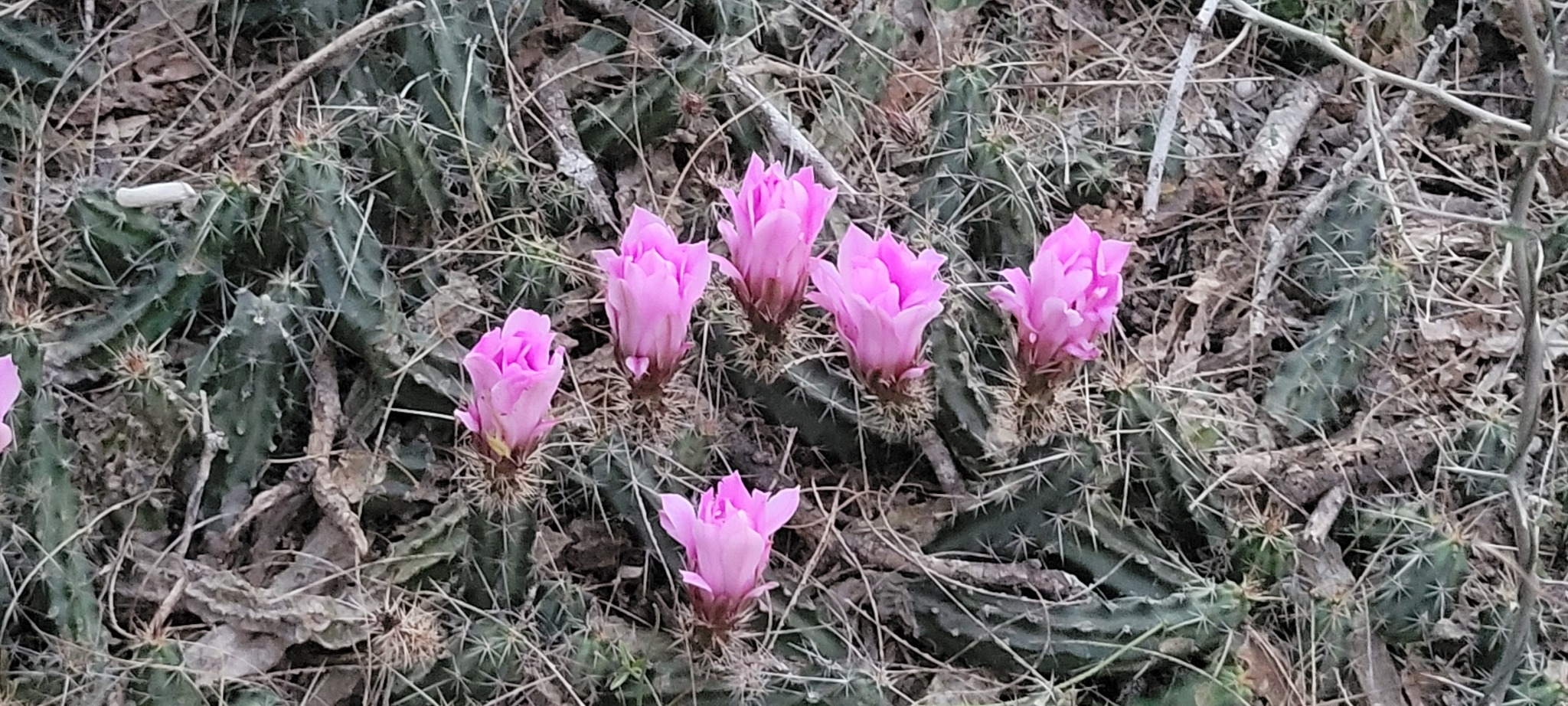
Habitat in Harlingen, Texas

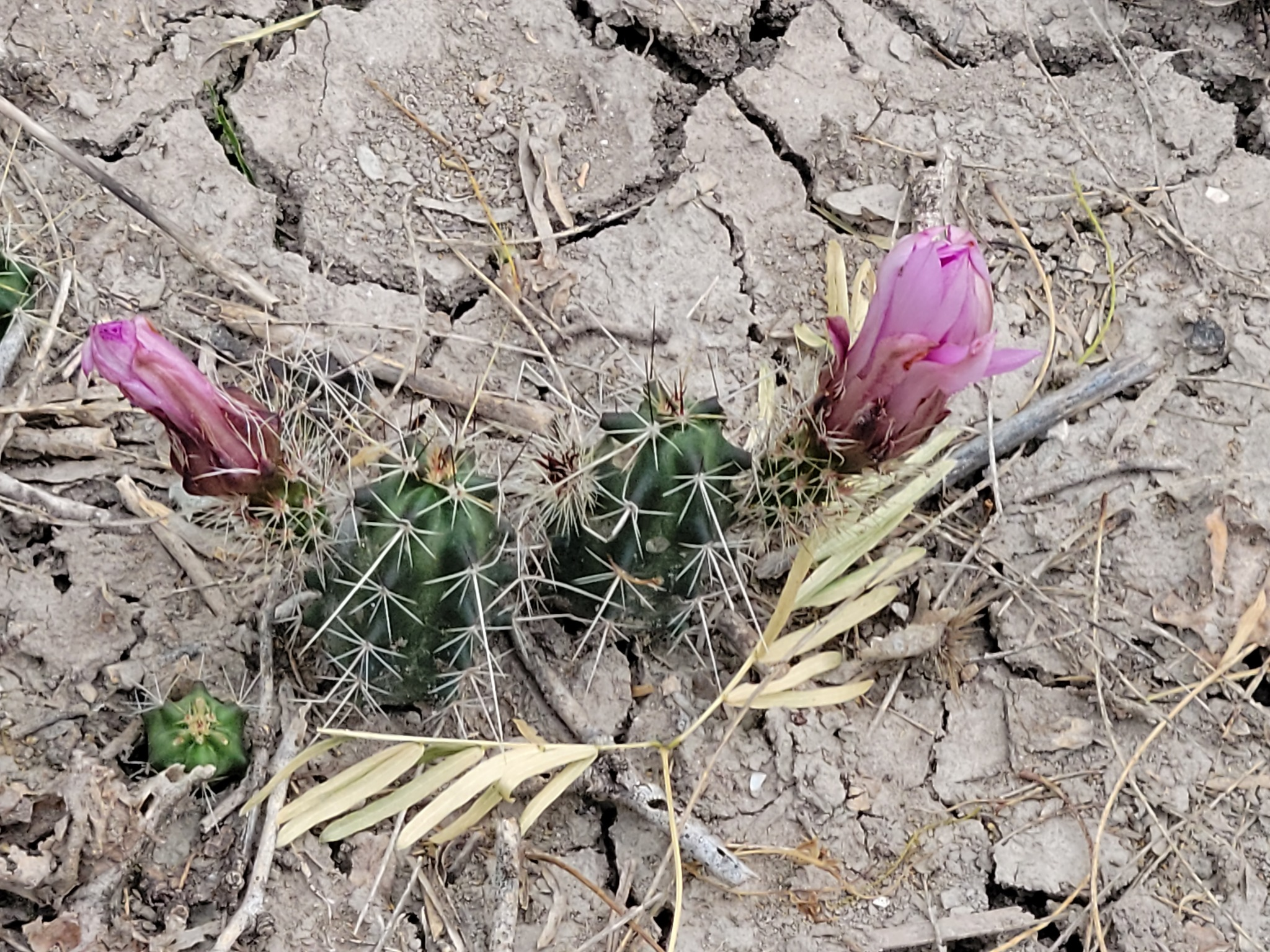
Plant growing in Mercedes, Texas

== Taxonomy ==
The first description as Cereus berlandieri by George Engelmann was published in 1856. The specific epithet berlandieri honors the plant collector Jean-Louis Berlandier (1803–1851). Friedrich Adolph Haage placed the species in the genus Echinocereus in 1859.
