= Epicorsia avilalis =

Scientific classification
- Domain: Eukaryota
- Kingdom: Animalia
- Phylum: Arthropoda
- Class: Insecta
- Order: Lepidoptera
- Family: Crambidae
- Genus: Epicorsia
- Species: E. avilalis

Binomial name
- Epicorsia avilalis Amsel, 1954

Species of moth

Epicorsia avilalis is a moth in the family Crambidae. It is found in Venezuela.
