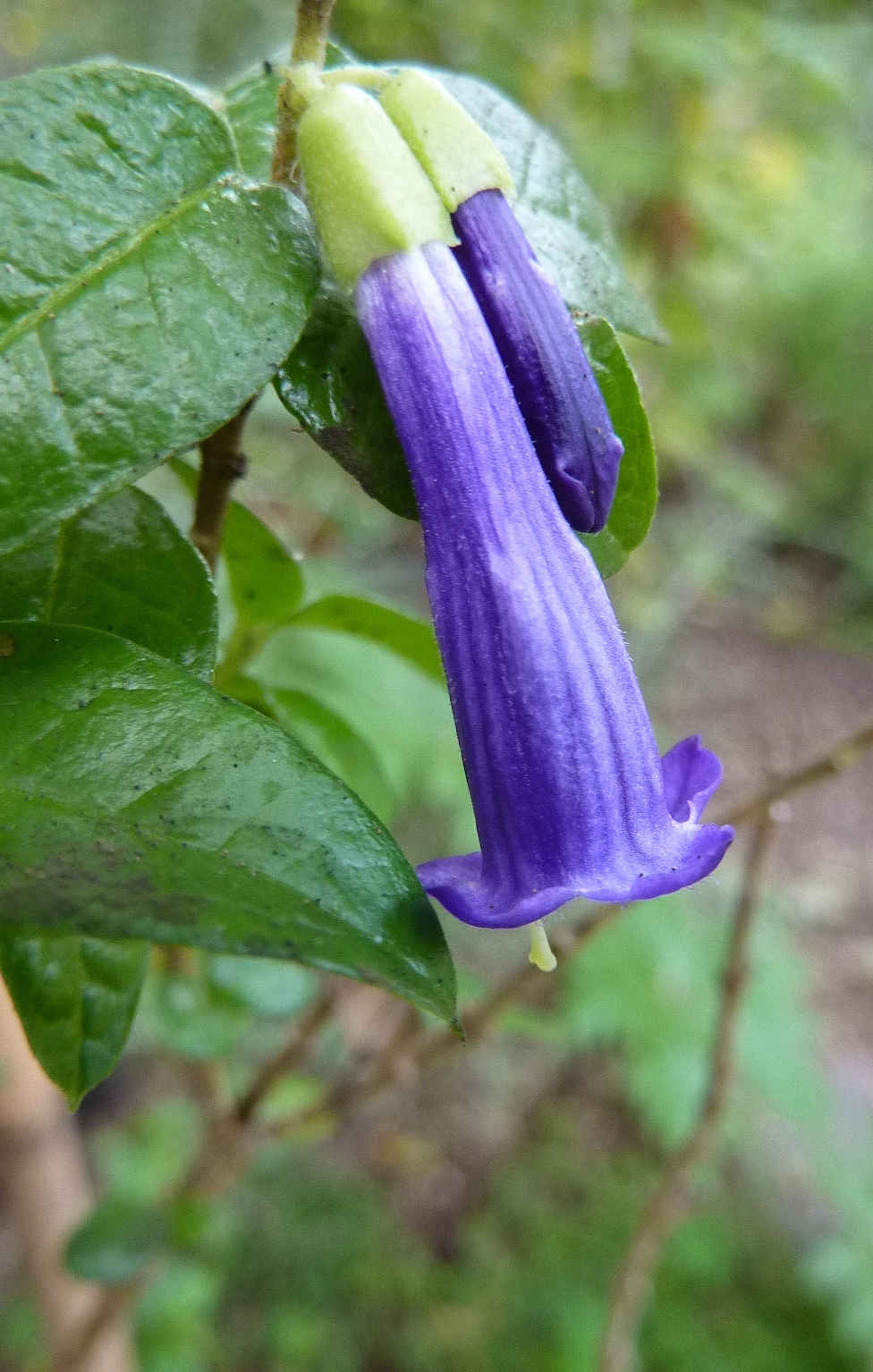
- Rhaphithamnus venustus at the Conservatoire botanique national de Brest, France

Conservation status
- Endangered (IUCN 3.1)

Scientific classification
- Kingdom: Plantae
- Clade: Embryophytes
- Clade: Tracheophytes
- Clade: Angiosperms
- Clade: Eudicots
- Clade: Asterids
- Order: Lamiales
- Family: Verbenaceae
- Genus: Rhaphithamnus
- Species: R. venustus

Binomial name
- Rhaphithamnus venustus (Phil.) Rob.

Synonyms
- List: Citharexylum elegans Phil. ex Miers; Citharexylum venustum Phil.; Rhaphithamnus coriaceus Miers ex Moldenke nom. inval.; Rhaphithamnus elegans Deless. ex Moldenke nom. inval.; Rhaphithamnus longiflorus Miers; Rhaphithamnus lucidus Gay ex Moldenke nom. inval.; Rhaphithamnus serratifolius Miers

= Rhaphithamnus venustus =

Species of flowering plant

Rhaphithamnus venustus, known locally as Juan Bueno, is a species of plant in the family Verbenaceae. It is endemic to the Juan Fernández Islands, an archipelago west of Chile. It is threatened by habitat loss.

Juan Bueno flowers are an important source of nectar for the Juan Fernández firecrown (Sephanoides fernandensis), a hummingbird that is also only found on the Juan Fernández Islands but is almost extinct today. The hummingbird, in turn, may be an important pollinator for the plant.
