= Crucibulum auricula =

Scientific classification
- Kingdom: Animalia
- Phylum: Mollusca
- Class: Gastropoda
- Subclass: Caenogastropoda
- Order: Littorinimorpha
- Family: Calyptraeidae
- Genus: Crucibulum
- Species: C. auricula

Binomial name
- Crucibulum auricula (Gmelin, 1791)

Species of gastropod

Crucibulum auricula is a species of sea snail, a marine gastropod mollusk in the family Calyptraeidae, the slipper snails or slipper limpets, cup-and-saucer snails, and Chinese hat snails.

== Description ==
The maximum recorded shell length is 29 mm.

== Habitat ==
The minimum recorded depth for this species is 1 m; maximum recorded depth is 115 m.
