= Epicorsia mellinalis =

Scientific classification
- Kingdom: Animalia
- Phylum: Arthropoda
- Class: Insecta
- Order: Lepidoptera
- Family: Crambidae
- Genus: Epicorsia
- Species: E. mellinalis

Binomial name
- Epicorsia mellinalis Hübner, 1818

Species of moth

Epicorsia mellinalis is a moth in the family Crambidae. It was described by Jacob Hübner in 1818. It is found in South America.
