= Epicorsia lucialis =

Scientific classification
- Domain: Eukaryota
- Kingdom: Animalia
- Phylum: Arthropoda
- Class: Insecta
- Order: Lepidoptera
- Family: Crambidae
- Genus: Epicorsia
- Species: E. lucialis

Binomial name
- Epicorsia lucialis Munroe, 1958

Species of moth

Epicorsia lucialis is a moth in the family Crambidae. It is found in Ecuador and on St. Lucia.

== Subspecies ==
- Epicorsia lucialis lucialis (St. Lucia)
- Epicorsia lucialis baezalis Munroe, 1958 (Ecuador)
