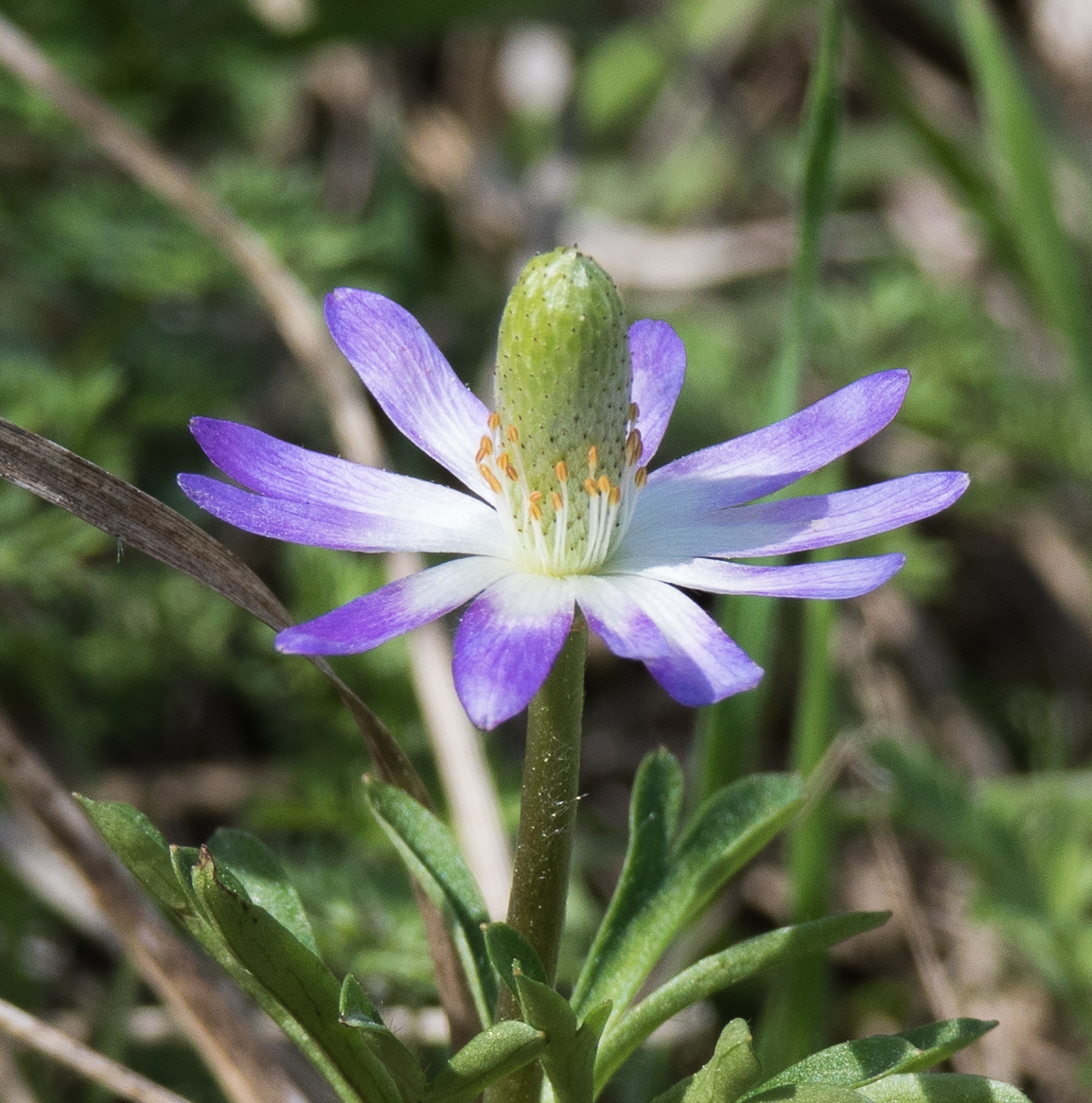
- Purple flower in Denton County, Texas

Conservation status
- Apparently Secure (NatureServe)

Scientific classification
- Kingdom: Plantae
- Clade: Embryophytes
- Clade: Tracheophytes
- Clade: Spermatophytes
- Clade: Angiosperms
- Clade: Eudicots
- Order: Ranunculales
- Family: Ranunculaceae
- Genus: Anemone
- Species: A. berlandieri

Binomial name
- Anemone berlandieri Pritz.

Synonyms
- Anemone caroliniana Torr. & A.Gray; Anemone decapetala var. heterophylla (Nutt.) Britton & Rusby; Anemone heterophylla (Nutt.) Alph.Wood

= Anemone berlandieri =

Species of flowering plant in the buttercup family

Anemone berlandieri, commonly known as tenpetal thimbleweed or tenpetal anemone, is a rhizomatous perennial flowering plant in the buttercup family Ranunculaceae. It is native to much of the Southern United States, where it flowers in the late winter and spring, between February and April. The specific epithet berlandieri honors Jean-Louis Berlandier (1803–1851), a botanist who explored Texas and Mexico in the nineteenth century.

== Distribution and habitat ==
Anemone berlandieri is native to much of the Southern United States, from Texas to Florida. It ranges as far north as Kansas, and as far south as northeast Mexico. There is also an isolated population in the southern Appalachian Mountains. It grows in sunny open areas, such as prairies and hillsides, and in wooded areas over a thin shale substrate.

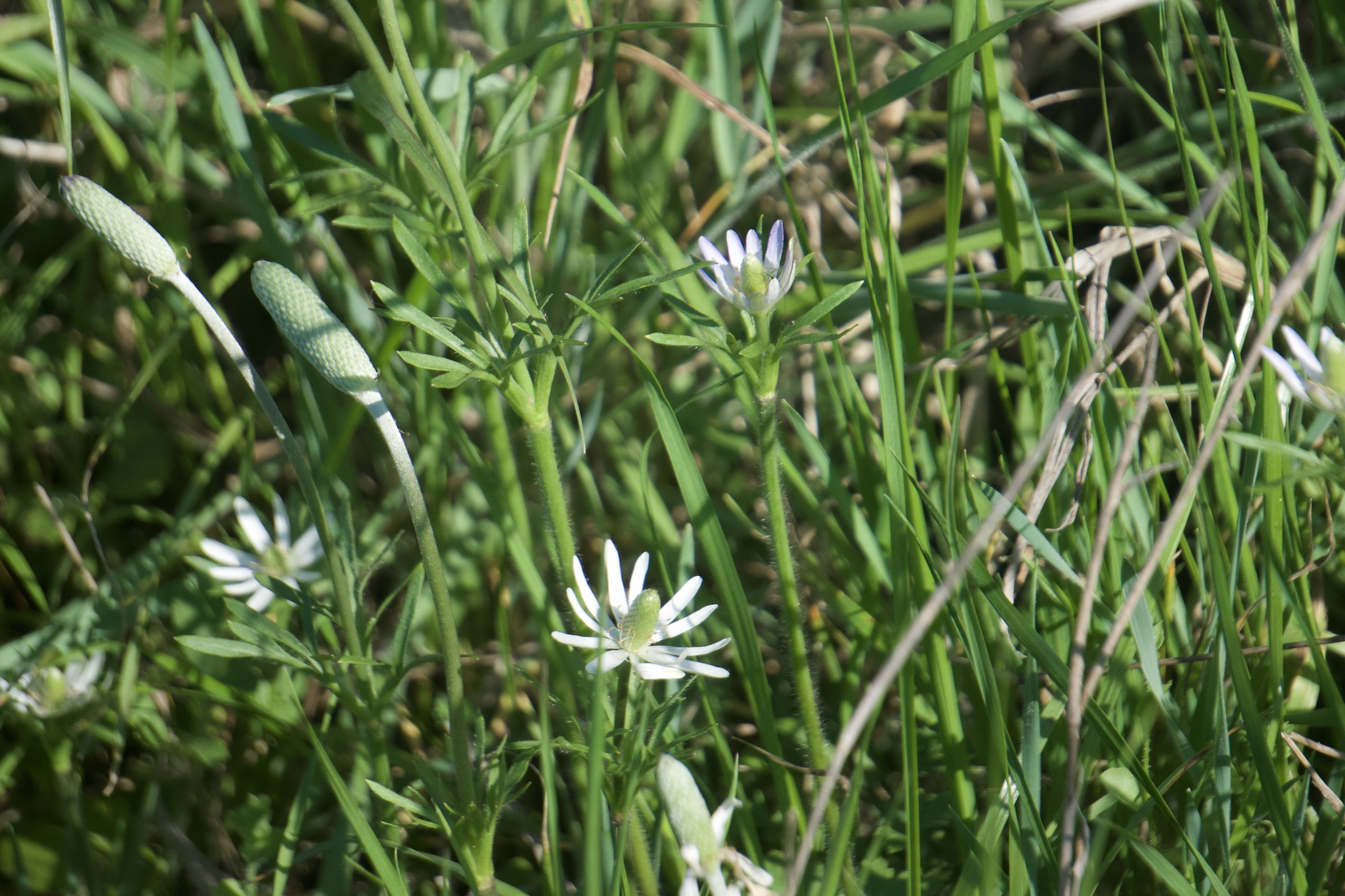
Flowers and flower buds in Williamson County, Texas

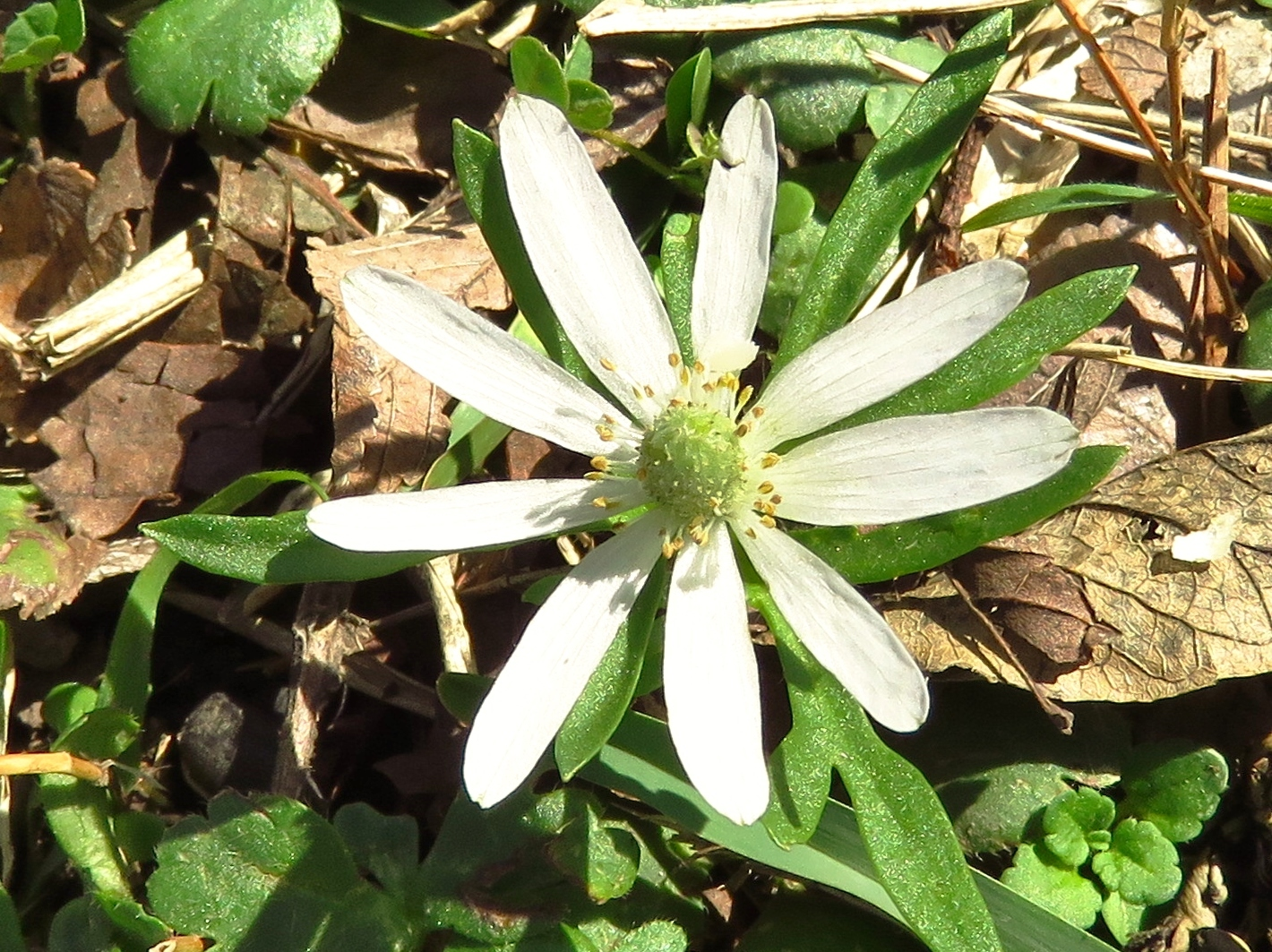
Growing in a lawn in Dallas County, Texas
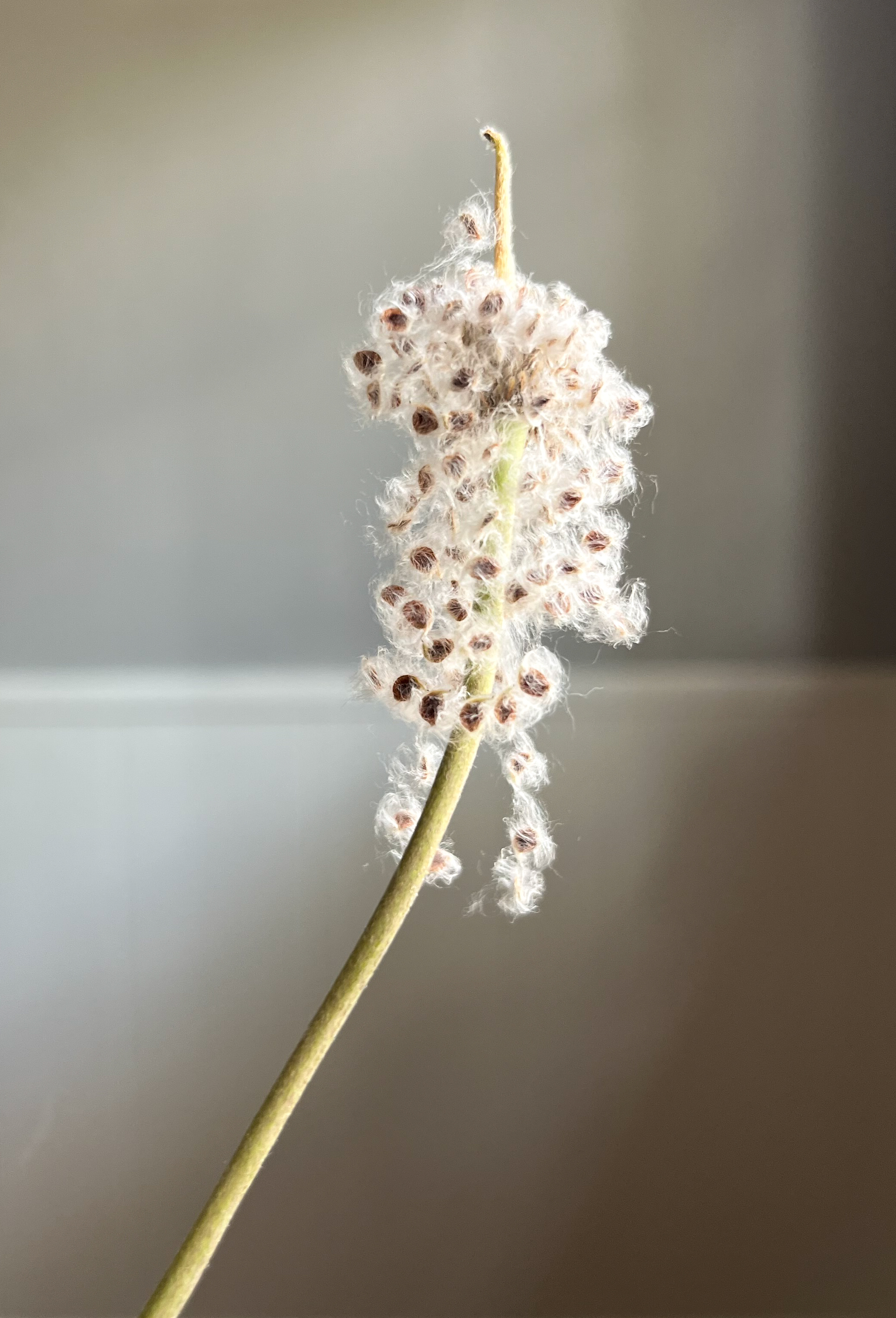
The seeds of anemone berlandieri (tenpetal anemone)
