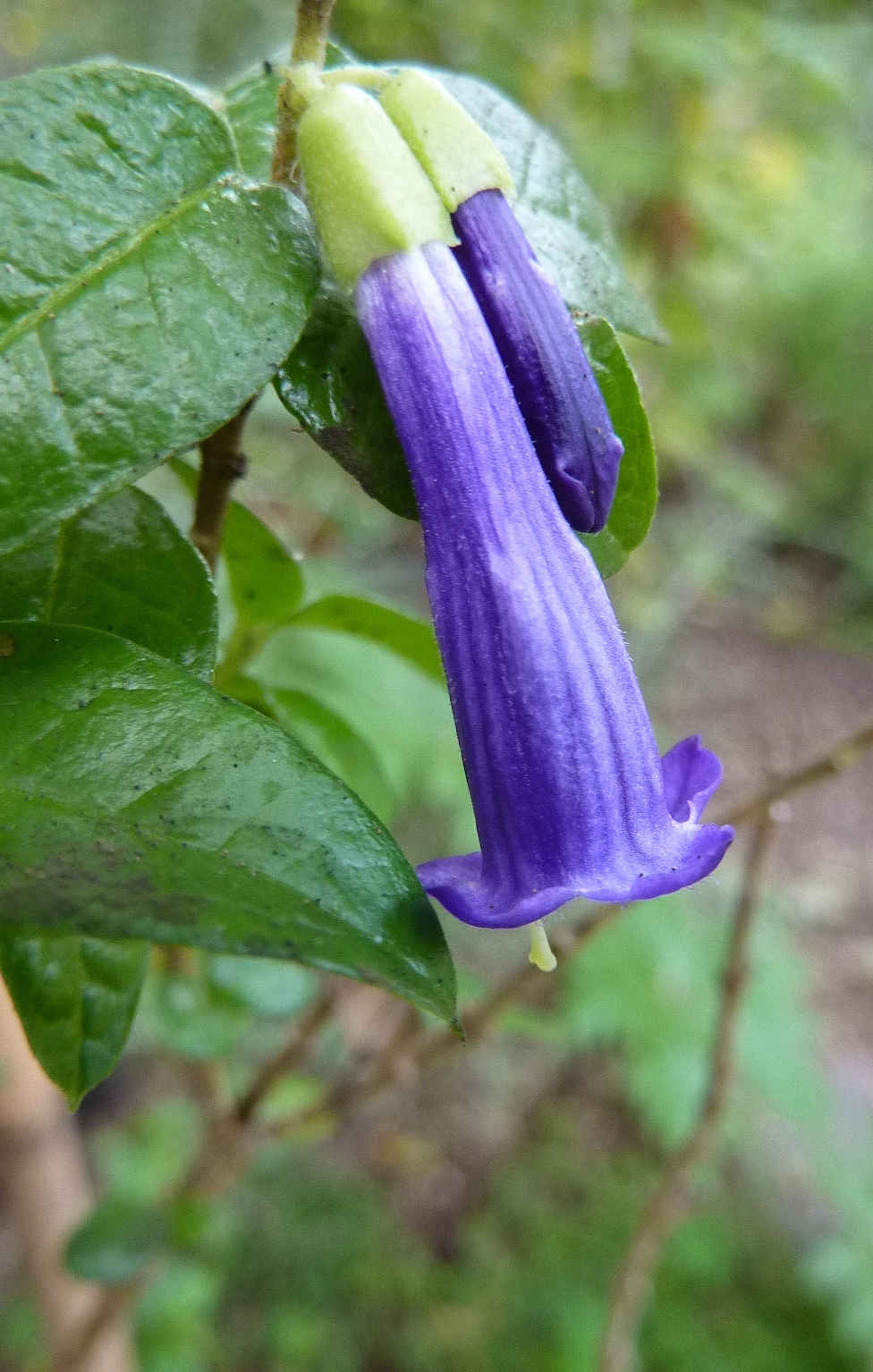
- R. venustus

Scientific classification
- Kingdom: Plantae
- Clade: Tracheophytes
- Clade: Angiosperms
- Clade: Eudicots
- Clade: Asterids
- Order: Lamiales
- Family: Verbenaceae
- Genus: Rhaphithamnus; Miers

Species
- Rhaphithamnus spinosus Rhaphithamnus venustus

Synonyms
- Homotypic Synonyms: Raphithamnus Dalla Torre & Harms; Heterotypic Synonyms: Poeppigia Bertero ex Férussac

= Rhaphithamnus =

Genus of flowering plants

Rhaphithamnus is a genus of flowering plants in the family Verbenaceae. It is native to Argentina, Chile, and the Juan Fernández Islands.

Traditionally, it is considered by the locals that the berries of this genus of plants are toxic or poisonous, so their consumption is not recommended.

== Species ==
Accepted species include:

- Rhaphithamnus spinosus (Juss.) Moldenke. Common names in Chile and Argentina repu, arayan macho and espino negro ( = 'black-thorn').
- Rhaphithamnus venustus (Phil.) Rob.

== Use in Chilean folk medicine ==
In the Los Lagos Region of southern Chile, R. spinosus is one of three plant species believed in local folk medicine to be antidotes to the anticholinergic poisoning caused by the dangerous hallucinogenic plant Latua pubiflora (Solanaceae). It is used by the shamans of the indigenous Huilliche people who employ Latua to enter trance in machitun healing rituals.

== Gallery ==
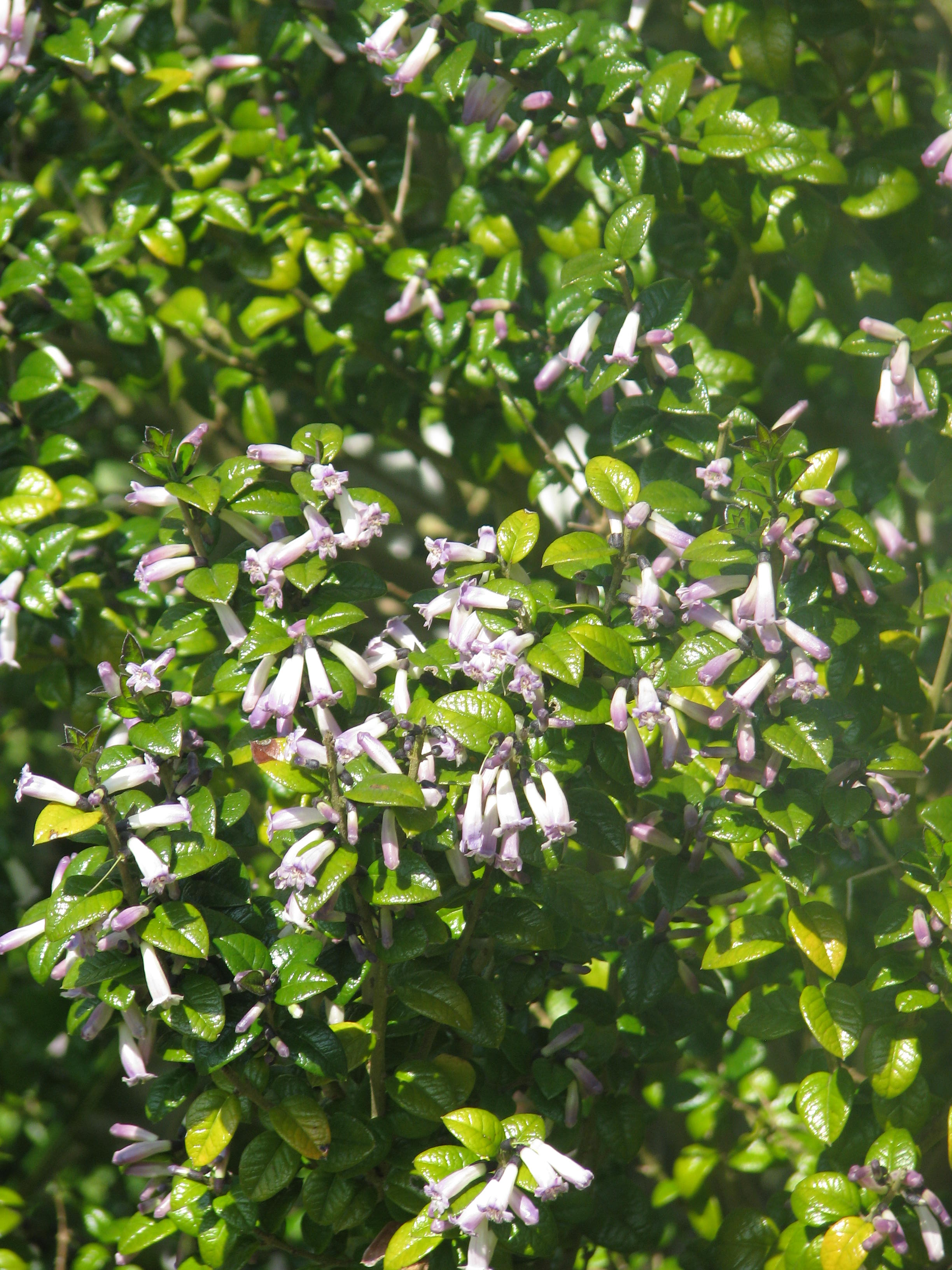
Rhaphithamnus spinosus in flower.

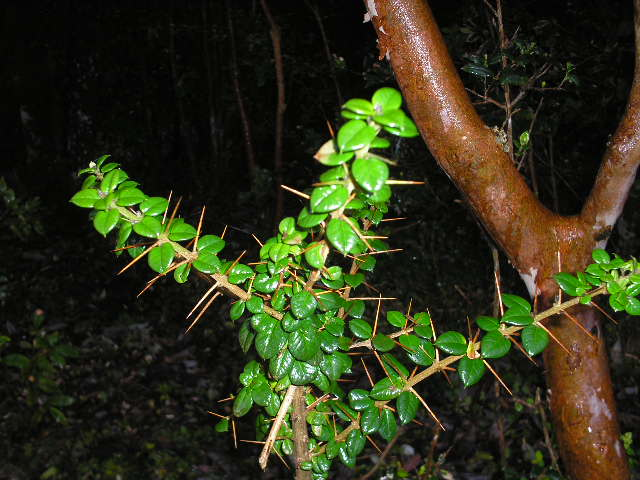
Spiny twigs of Rhaphithamnus spinosus.

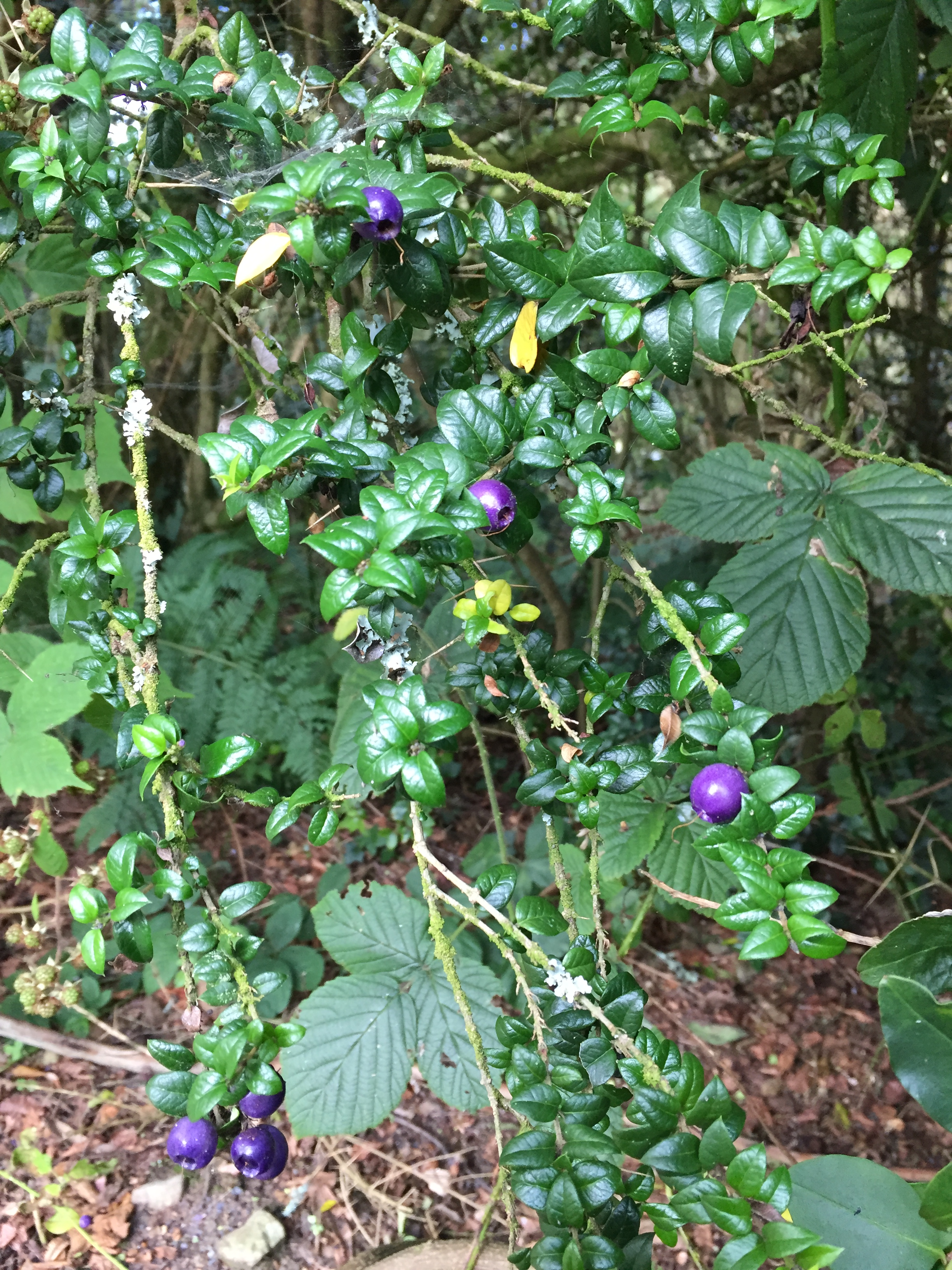
Mid-shot of fruiting specimen of R. spinosus in Chilean planting at Logan Botanic Garden.

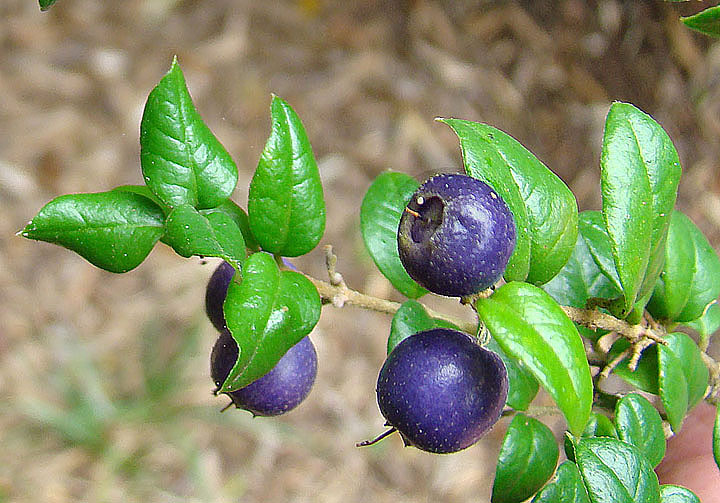
Close-up of striking, bluish-purple fruits of Rhaphithamnus spinosus.
