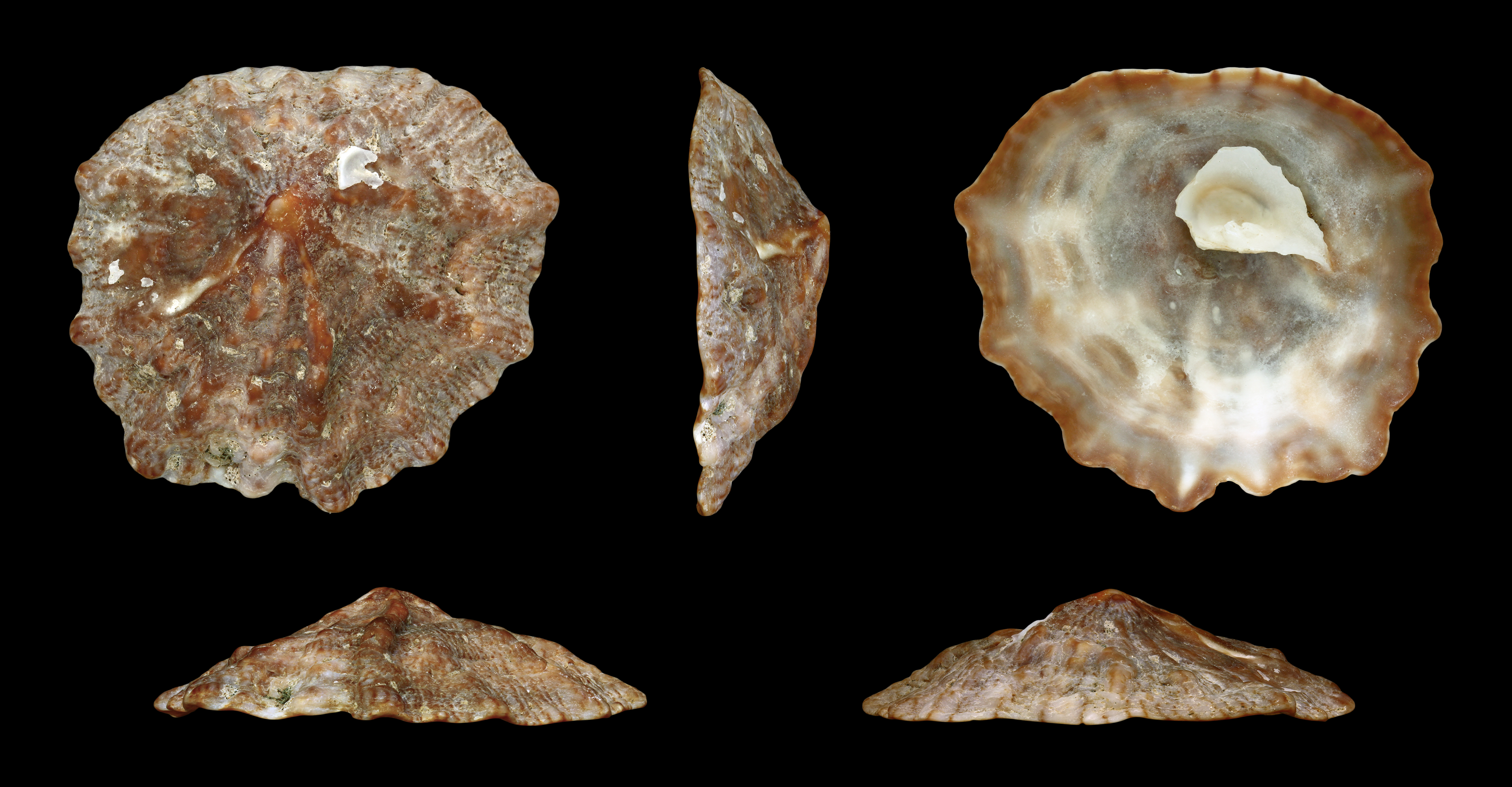
- Crucibulum scutellatum

Scientific classification
- Kingdom: Animalia
- Phylum: Mollusca
- Class: Gastropoda
- Subclass: Caenogastropoda
- Order: Littorinimorpha
- Family: Calyptraeidae
- Genus: Crucibulum; Schumacher, 1817

Type species
- Crucibulum planum Schumacher, 1817

Synonyms
- Calyptraea (Calypeopsis) Lesson, 1831; Dispotaea Say, 1824

= Crucibulum (gastropod) =

Genus of gastropods

Crucibulum, commonly known as cup-and-saucer snails, is a genus of sea snails, marine gastropod molluscs in the family Calyptraeidae.

== Species ==
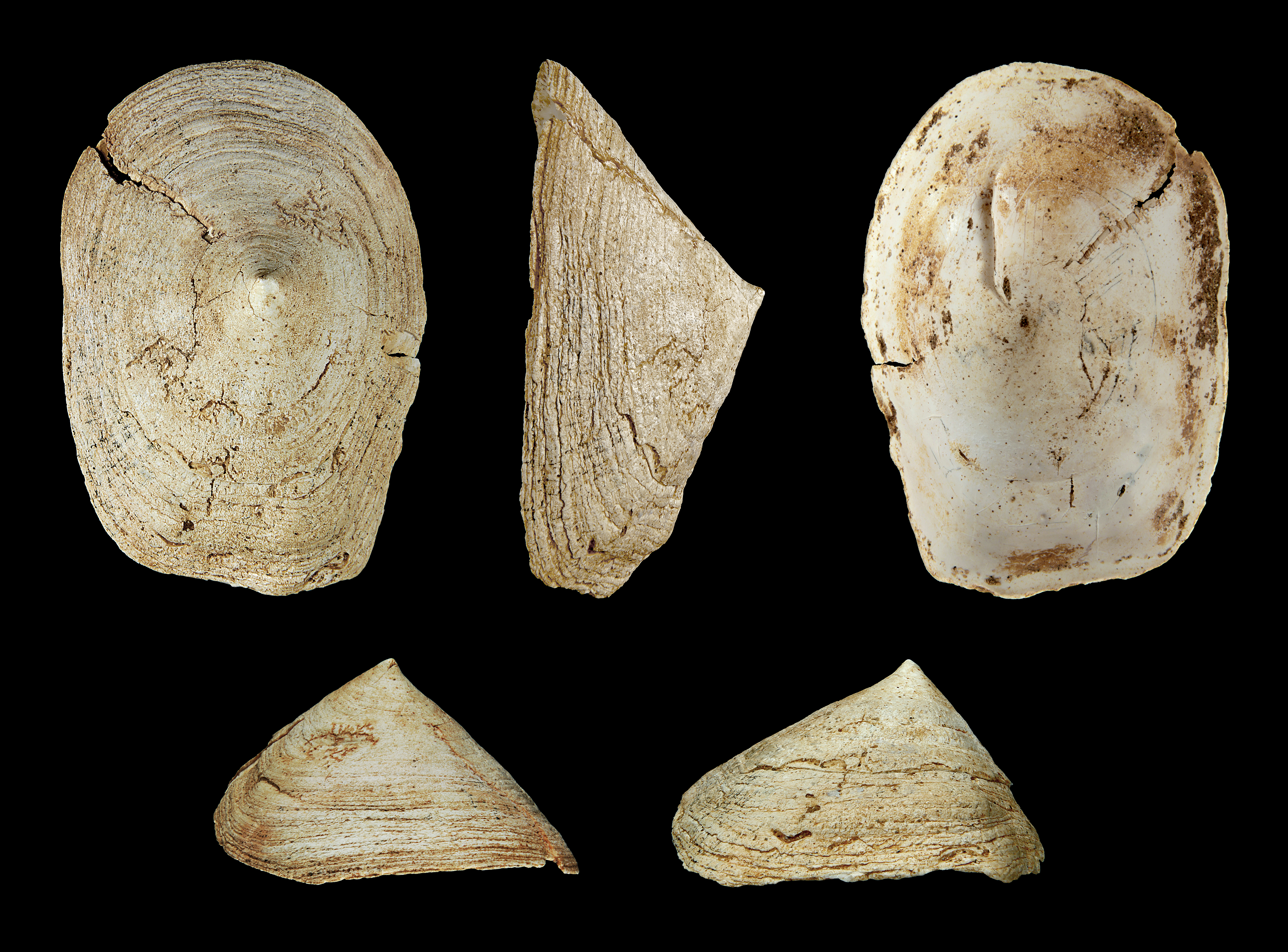
Crucibulum deformis, a fossil species from Miocene

Species within the genus Crucibulum include:

- Crucibulum auricula (Gmelin, 1791)
- Crucibulum concameratum Reeve, 1859
- † Crucibulum costatum (Say, 1820)
- Crucibulum cyclopium Berry, 1969
- Crucibulum lignarium (Broderip, 1834)
- Crucibulum marense Weisbord, 1962
- Crucibulum monticulus Berry, 1969
- Crucibulum pectinatum Carpenter, 1856
- Crucibulum personatum Keen, 1958
- Crucibulum planum Schumacher, 1817
- Crucibulum quiriquinae (Lesson, 1830)
- Crucibulum scutellatum (W. Wood, 1828)
- Crucibulum serratum (Broderip, 1834)
- Crucibulum spinosum (Sowerby, 1824)
- Crucibulum springvaleense Rutsch, 1942
- Crucibulum striatum (Say, 1826)
- Crucibulum subactum Berry, 1963
- Crucibulum umbrella (Deshayes, 1830)
- Crucibulum waltonense Gardner, 1947

Species brought into synonymy

- Crucibulum extinctorium (Lamarck, 1822) : synonym of Calyptraea extinctorium Lamarck, 1822: synonym of Desmaulus extinctorium (Lamarck, 1822)
- Crucibulum renovatum Crosse & P. Fischer, 1890: synonym of Calyptraea renovata (Crosse & P. Fischer, 1890) (original combination)
