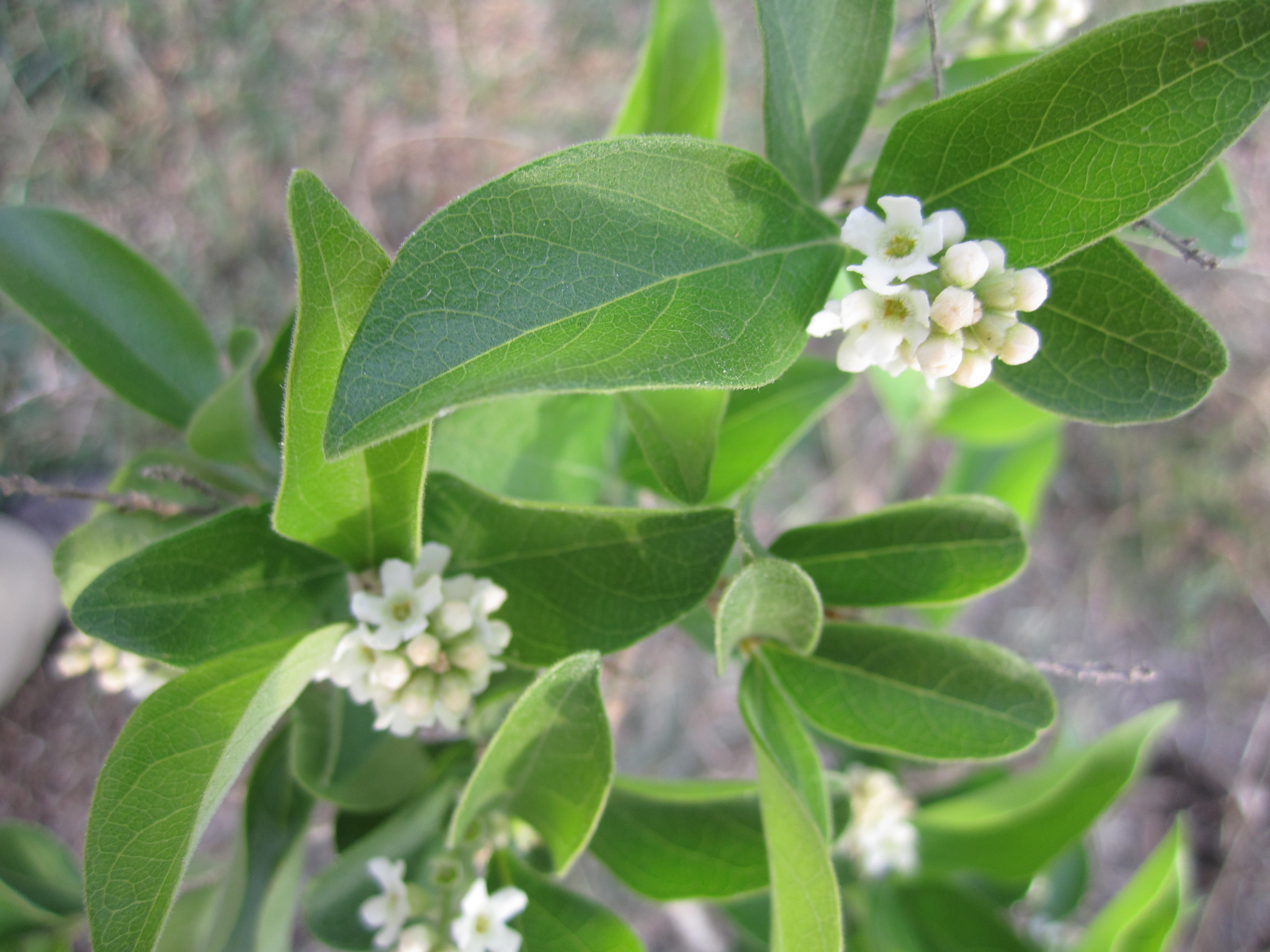

Conservation status
- Apparently Secure (NatureServe)

Scientific classification
- Kingdom: Plantae
- Clade: Embryophytes
- Clade: Tracheophytes
- Clade: Angiosperms
- Clade: Eudicots
- Clade: Asterids
- Order: Lamiales
- Family: Verbenaceae
- Genus: Citharexylum
- Species: C. berlandieri

Binomial name
- Citharexylum berlandieri B.L.Rob.
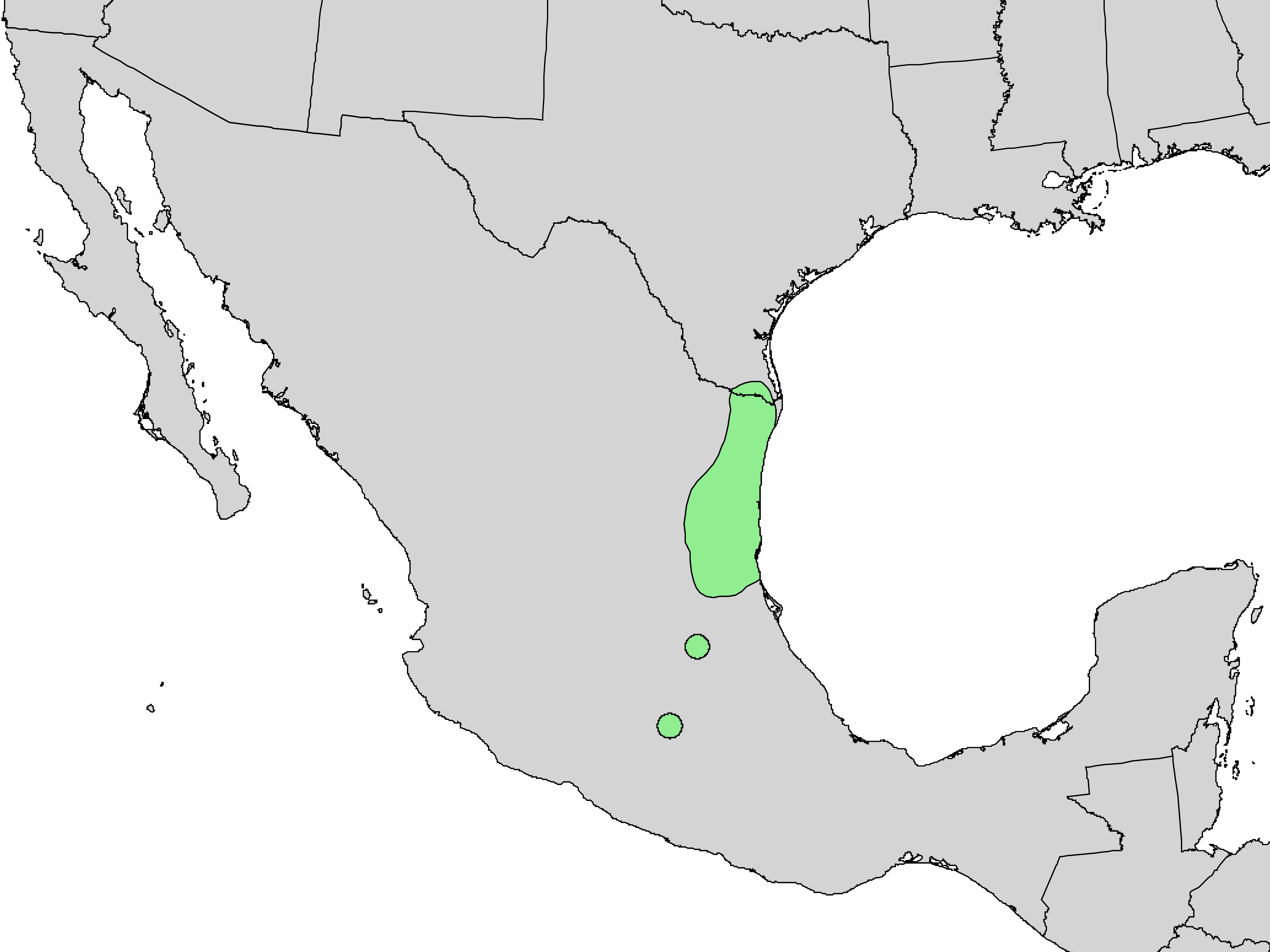
- Natural range of Citharexylum berlandieri

= Citharexylum berlandieri =

Species of flowering plant

Citharexylum berlandieri is a species of flowering plant in the verbena family, Verbenaceae, that is native to the Lower Rio Grande Valley of Texas in the United States and Mexico as far south as Oaxaca. Common names include Tamaulipan fiddlewood, Berlandier fiddlewood, negrito fiddlewood, negrito, and orcajuela. It is a shrub or small tree, reaching a height of 6 m (20 ft). The type specimen of this species was collected from the hills near Las Canoas, San Luis Potosí by Cyrus Pringle in 1890. It was described as a new species the following year by Benjamin Lincoln Robinson, who chose the specific epithet to honour French naturalist Jean-Louis Berlandier.

== Uses ==
The bark of this plant is used for firewood in Mexico.
