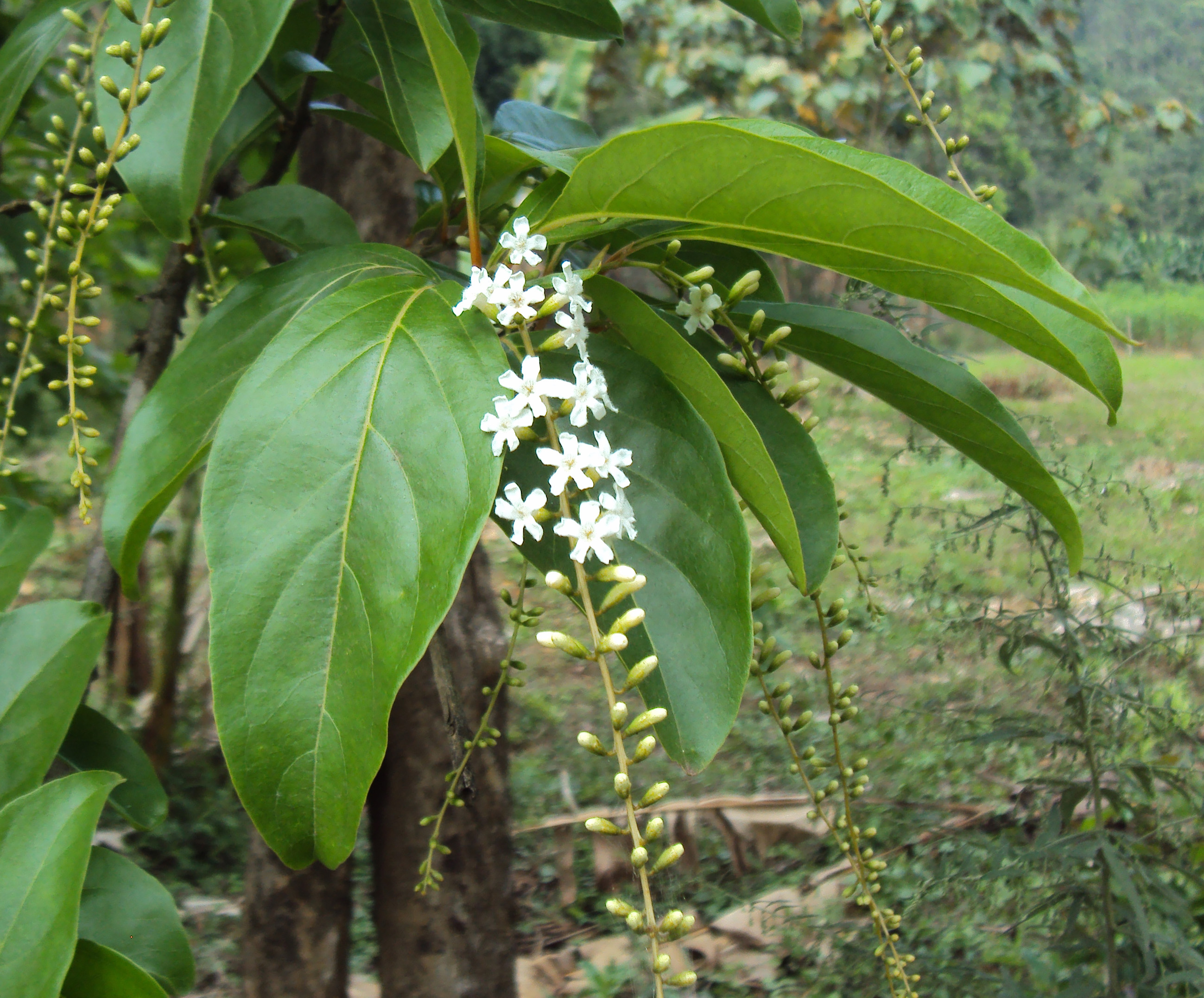

Conservation status
- Least Concern (IUCN 3.1)

Scientific classification
- Kingdom: Plantae
- Clade: Embryophytes
- Clade: Tracheophytes
- Clade: Angiosperms
- Clade: Eudicots
- Clade: Asterids
- Order: Lamiales
- Family: Verbenaceae
- Genus: Citharexylum
- Species: C. spinosum

Binomial name
- Citharexylum spinosum L.

Synonyms
- Citharexylum fruticosum L. Citharexylum quadrangulare Jacq.

= Citharexylum spinosum =

Florida fiddlewood

Species of tree

Citharexylum spinosum is a species of flowering plant in the family Verbenaceae that is native to southern Florida in the United States, the Caribbean, Guyana, Suriname, and Venezuela. Common names include Florida fiddlewood and spiny fiddlewood.

== Description ==
It is a tree that reaches a height of up to 15 m (49 ft). The ovate to elliptic leaves are 4–20 cm (1.6–7.9 in) long and have orange petioles. Small white flowers are produced throughout the year on hanging axillary and terminal racemes and panicles 20–40 cm (7.9–15.7 in) in length. The fruit are red to black subglobose drupes 7–10 mm (0.28–0.39 in) in diameter.

Ceroplastes cirripediformis Comstock (Hemiptera: Coccidae) is reported to infest the tree in Kerala.
