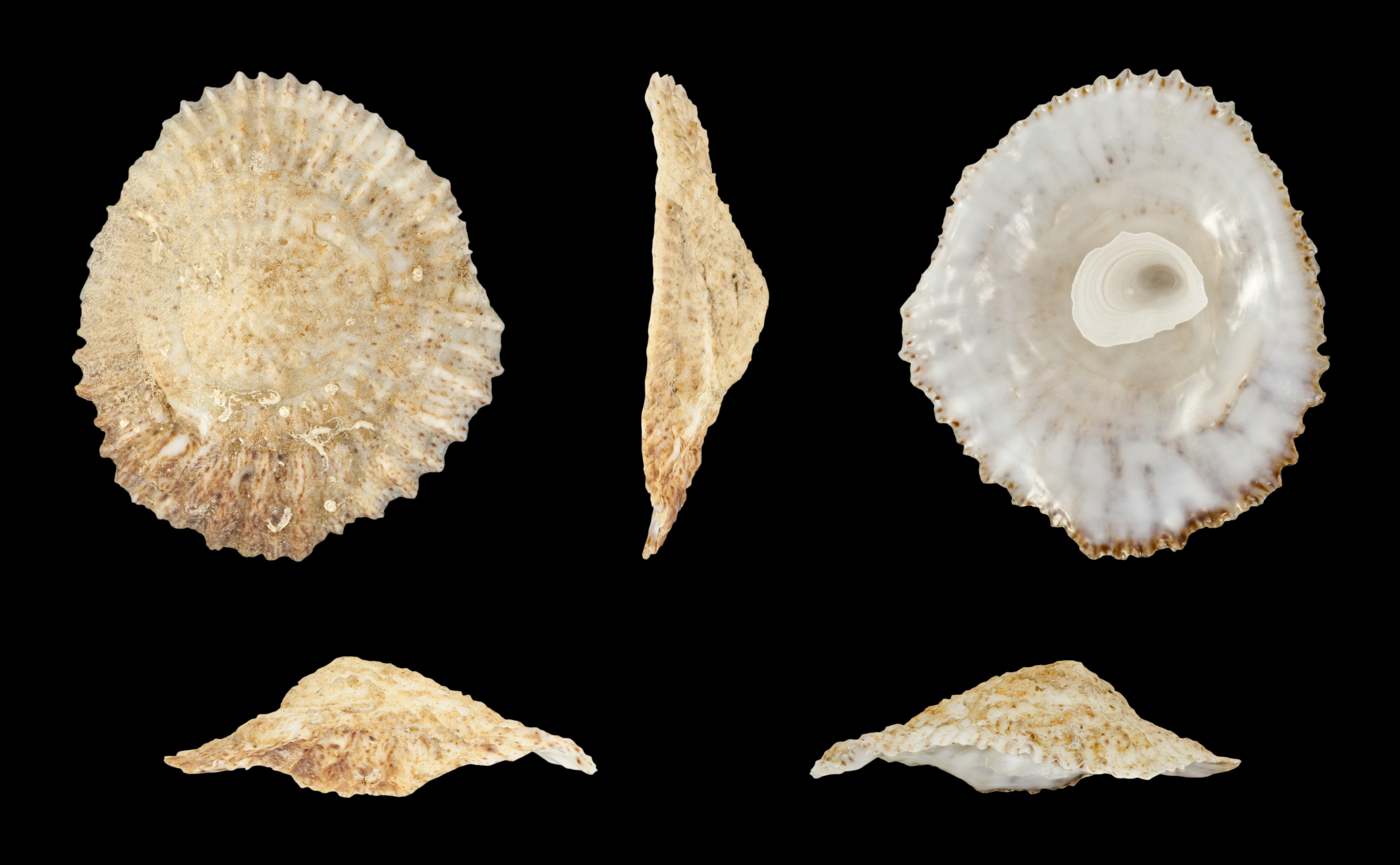

Scientific classification
- Kingdom: Animalia
- Phylum: Mollusca
- Class: Gastropoda
- Subclass: Caenogastropoda
- Order: Littorinimorpha
- Family: Calyptraeidae
- Genus: Crucibulum
- Species: C. spinosum

Binomial name
- Crucibulum spinosum (Sowerby I, 1824)

= Crucibulum spinosum =

Species of gastropod

Crucibulum spinosum, common name the spiny cup-and-saucer snail, is a species of sea snail, a marine gastropod mollusk in the family Calyptraeidae, the slipper snails and cup-and-saucer snails.

== Description ==
The shell has a width of 44.6 mm.

== Distribution ==
This species is native to the west coast of the Americas, from California to Chile. It has been introduced and established in Hawaii.
