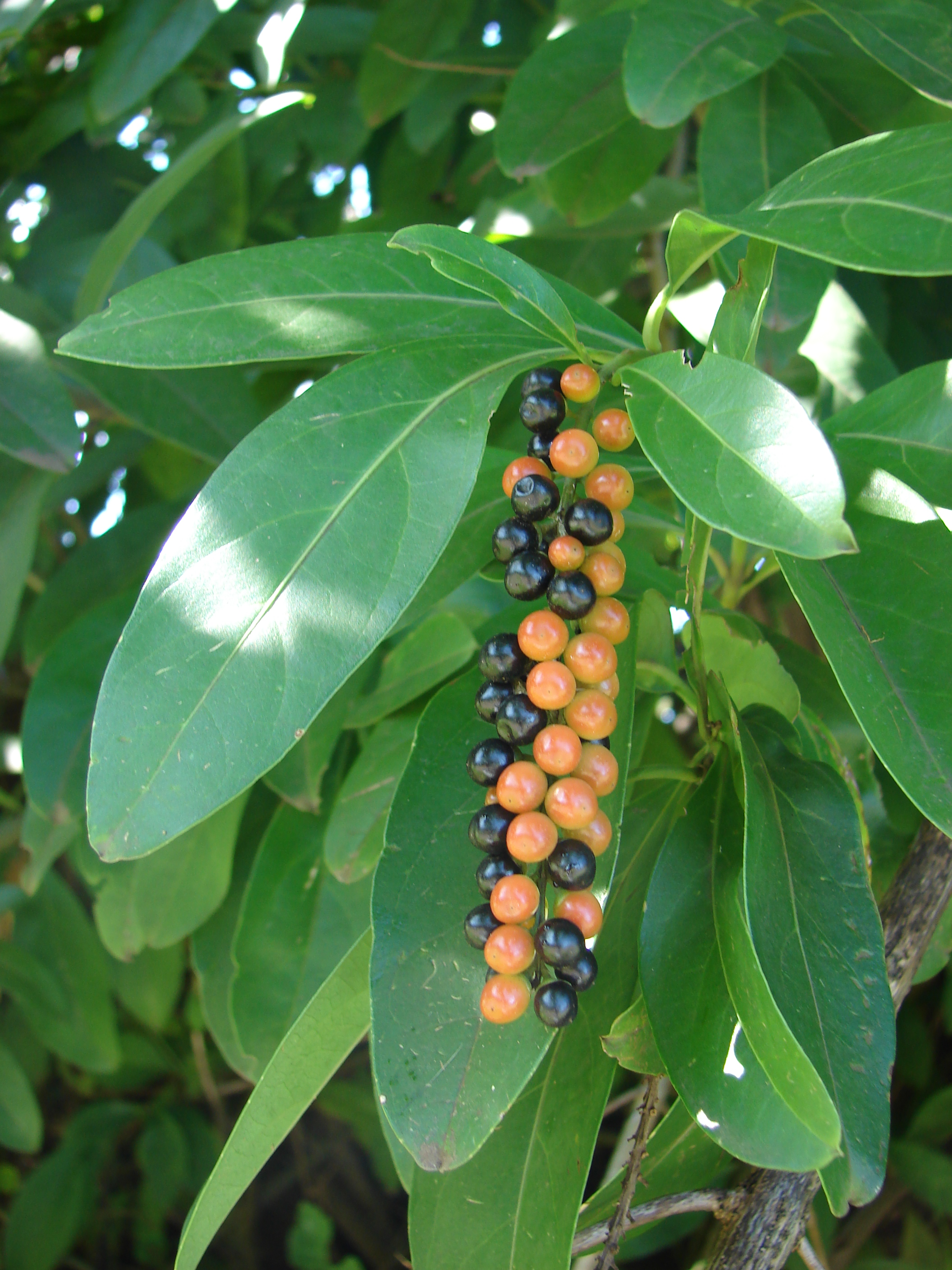
- C. caudatum

Scientific classification
- Kingdom: Plantae
- Clade: Tracheophytes
- Clade: Angiosperms
- Clade: Eudicots
- Clade: Asterids
- Order: Lamiales
- Family: Verbenaceae
- Genus: Citharexylum; B.Juss. (1753)

Type species
- Citharexylum spinosum (L.)

Synonyms
- Baillonia Bocq. (1862); Dicaryum Willd. ex Roem. & Schult. (1819); Rauwolfia Ruiz & Pav. (1799), orth. var.

= Citharexylum =

Genus of flowering plants

Citharexylum is a genus of flowering plants in the verbena family, Verbenaceae. It contains shrub and tree species commonly known as fiddlewoods or zitherwoods. They are native to the Americas, ranging from southern Florida and Texas in the United States to Argentina. The highest diversity occurs in Mexico and the Andes. The generic name is derived from the Greek words κιθάρα (kithara), meaning "lyre", and ξύλον (xylon), meaning "wood," referring to the use of the wood in the sounding boards of string instruments. Several species, especially C. caudatum and C. spinosum, are cultivated as ornamentals.

== Species ==
78 species are accepted.

1. Citharexylum affine D.Don - from northern Mexico to Nicaragua
2. Citharexylum alainii Moldenke - Dominican Republic
3. Citharexylum altamiranum Greenm. - northeastern Mexico
4. Citharexylum amabile (Bocq.) Christenh. & Byng – west-central Brazil, Paraguay, and northeastern Argentina
5. Citharexylum andinum Moldenke - Bolivia, Jujuy Province of Argentina
6. Citharexylum berlandieri B.L. Rob. - from Texas to Oaxaca - Berlandier's fiddlewood, Tamaulipan fiddlewood
7. Citharexylum bourgeauanum Greenm. - Veracruz, Oaxaca
8. Citharexylum brachyanthum (A.Gray ex Hemsl.) A.Gray - Texas, Coahuila, Nuevo León - Boxthorn fiddlewood, Mexican fiddlewood
9. Citharexylum broadwayi O.E.Schulz - Trinidad and northeastern Venezuela
10. Citharexylum calvum Moldenke - Quintana Roo
11. Citharexylum caudatum L. - southern Mexico, West Indies, Central America, Colombia, Peru - Juniper berry
12. Citharexylum cooperi Standl. - Costa Rica, Panama, Guatemala
13. Citharexylum costaricense Moldenke - Costa Rica, Nicaragua, Honduras
14. Citharexylum crassifolium Greenm - Chiapas, Belize, Guatemala, Honduras
15. Citharexylum danirae León de la Luz & F.Chiang - Revillagigedo Islands of Baja California
16. Citharexylum decorum Moldenke - Colombia, Venezuela
17. Citharexylum dentatum D.Don - Peru
18. Citharexylum discolor Turcz. - Cuba, Hispaniola
19. Citharexylum donnell-smithii Greenm. - Oaxaca, Chiapas, Central America
20. Citharexylum ekmanii Moldenke - Cuba
21. Citharexylum ellipticum Moc. & Sessé ex D.Don - Veracruz, Campeche, Tabasco; naturalized in Cuba + Cayman Islands
22. Citharexylum endlichii Moldenke - northeastern Mexico
23. Citharexylum flabellifolium S.Watson - Sonora, Baja California
24. Citharexylum flexuosum (Ruiz & Pav.) D.Don - Bolivia, Peru
25. Citharexylum fulgidum Moldenke - Veracruz, northeastern Mexico
26. Citharexylum glabrum (S.Watson) Greenm - Oaxaca
27. Citharexylum guatemalense (Moldenke) D.N.Gibson - Guatemala, Nicaragua
28. Citharexylum herrerae Mansf. - Peru
29. Citharexylum hexangulare Greenm. - from northern Mexico to Costa Rica
30. Citharexylum hidalgense Moldenke - Mexico
31. Citharexylum hintonii Moldenke - México State
32. Citharexylum hirtellum Standl. - from Veracruz to Panama
33. Citharexylum ilicifolium Kunth - Bolivia, Peru, Ecuador
34. Citharexylum × jamaicense Moldenke - Jamaica, Haiti, Puerto Rico (C. caudatum × C. spinosum)
35. Citharexylum joergensenii (Lillo) Moldenke - Argentina, Bolivia
36. Citharexylum karstenii Moldenke - Colombia, Venezuela
37. Citharexylum kerberi Greenm. - Veracruz
38. Citharexylum kunthianum Moldenke - Colombia, Venezuela, Ecuador
39. Citharexylum laurifolium Hayek - Bolivia, Peru
40. Citharexylum × leonis Moldenke - Cuba (C. caudatum × C. tristachyum)
41. Citharexylum ligustrifolium (Thur. ex Decne.) Van Houtte - Mexico
42. Citharexylum lucidum Cham. & Schltdl. - Mexico
43. Citharexylum lycioides D.Don - Mexico
44. Citharexylum macradenium Greenm. - Panama, Costa Rica
45. Citharexylum macrochlamys Pittier - Panama, Colombia
46. Citharexylum matheanum Borhidi & Kereszty - Cuba
47. Citharexylum matudae Moldenke - Chiapas
48. Citharexylum mexicanum Moldenke - Veracruz, Puebla, Oaxaca
49. Citharexylum microphyllum (DC.) O.E.Schulz - Hisipaniola
50. Citharexylum mocinoi D.Don - Mexico, Central America
51. Citharexylum montanum Moldenke - Colombia, Ecuador
52. Citharexylum montevidense (Spreng.) Moldenke - Brazil, Argentina, Paraguay, Uruguay
53. Citharexylum myrianthum Cham. - Brazil, Argentina, Paraguay
54. Citharexylum obtusifolium Kuhlm - Espírito Santo (unplaced)
55. Citharexylum oleinum (Benth. ex Lindl.) Moldenke - Mexico
56. Citharexylum ovatifolium Greenm. - Mexico
57. Citharexylum peruvianum N.O'Leary & Frost - northwestern Peru
58. Citharexylum poeppigii Walp. - Colombia, Venezuela, Ecuador, Bolivia, Peru, Brazil
59. Citharexylum quitense Spreng. - Ecuador
60. Citharexylum racemosum Sessé & Moc. - Mexico
61. Citharexylum reticulatum Kunth - Ecuador, Peru
62. Citharexylum rosei Greenm. - Mexico
63. Citharexylum roxanae Moldenke - Baja California
64. Citharexylum scabrum Moc. & Sessé ex D.Don - northern Mexico
65. Citharexylum schottii Greenm. - southern Mexico, Central America
66. Citharexylum schulzii Urb. & Ekman - Hispaniola
67. Citharexylum sessaei D.Don - Mexico
68. Citharexylum shrevei Moldenke - Sonora
69. Citharexylum solanaceum Cham. - southern Brazil
70. Citharexylum spinosum L. – Spiny fiddlewood - West Indies, Panama, Venezuela, the Guianas; naturalized in India, Mozambique, Fiji, Bermuda
71. Citharexylum stenophyllum Urb. & Ekman - Haiti
72. Citharexylum steyermarkii Moldenke - Veracruz, Chiapas, Guatemala
73. Citharexylum subflavescens S.F.Blake - Colombia, Venezuela, Ecuador, Peru
74. Citharexylum subthyrsoideum Pittier - Colombia, Venezuela
75. Citharexylum svensonii Moldenke - Ecuador
76. Citharexylum teclense Standl. - El Salvador
77. Citharexylum ternatum Moldenke - Cuba
78. Citharexylum tetramerum Brandegee - Valle de Tehuacán-Cuicatlán in Mexico
79. Citharexylum tristachyum Turcz. – Threespike Fiddlewood - Cuba, Jamaica, Leeward Islands
80. Citharexylum ulei Moldenke - Colombia, Peru, northwestern Brazil
81. Citharexylum venezuelense Moldenke - Venezuela
82. Citharexylum weberbaueri Hayek - Peru

== Formerly placed here ==
- Rehdera trinervis (S.F.Blake) Moldenke (as Citharexylum lemsii Moldenke)
- Rhaphithamnus spinosus (Juss.) Moldenke (as Citharexylum cyanocarpum Hook. & Arn.)
- Rhaphithamnus venustus (Phil.) Rob. (as Citharexylum elegans Phil. ex Miers)
