= Jean-Louis Berlandier =

French anthropologist, botanist and physician (1803–1851)

Jean-Louis Berlandier (1803 – 1851) was a French-Mexican naturalist, medical doctor, and anthropologist.

== Early life ==
Berlandier was born in Geneva, and later trained as a botanist there. During this time he probably served an apprenticeship to a pharmacist.

== Career ==
In his early 20s on the recommendation of his mentor, Auguste Pyrame De Candolle, he joined a Mexican scientific expedition as a biologist and plant specialist. Berlandier arrived at Pánuco, in the Mexican state of Veracruz, in December 1826. He collected plants in the surrounding area before continuing into Texas as part of the Mexican Boundary Commission. The commission left Mexico City on November 10, 1827, under the command of Manuel de Mier y Terán. Berlandier made botanical collections around Laredo, Texas, in February 1828 and around San Antonio, Gonzales, and San Felipe in March, April, and May 1828. After a brief trip to the interior of the country after he contacted malaria, he returned to San Antonio. He collected botanical specimens, made notes on animal species, and collected information on over forty Native American tribes in the surrounding territory, with special emphasis on the Comanche. In the fall of 1828, with a group of 30 Mexican soldiers led by Colonel José Francisco Ruiz, Berlandier accompanied Comanche leaders Reyuna and El Ronca on a bear and American bison hunt on open lands northwest of San Antonio. From November 19 to December 18, Berlandier accompanied Ruiz to explore the silver mines on the San Saba River. On February 3, 1829, he also joined a force led by Antonio Elosúa to put down an uprising against the presidio commander at Goliad.

After the commission was dissolved in November 1829, Berlandier settled in Matamoros, Tamaulipas, and became a physician. He made additional botanical and animal collecting trips in Texas and other parts of Mexico, including returning to Goliad in 1834.

Berlandier compiled detailed information on the expeditions, including catalogues of plants, animals and Native American groups. This information is among the earliest ethnological studies of the tribes of the southern plains. One of his original manuscripts, dated 1834, is currently held by the Gilcrease Museum in Tulsa, Oklahoma.

Berlandier served as a captain, cartographer, and aide-de-camp in Mexico's Army of the North at the outbreak of hostilities between the United States and Mexico in the spring of 1846, under the command of General (later President) Mariano Arista. Captain Berlandier drew the first sketch maps of the battle of Palo Alto (May 8, 1846), which now reside in the Library of Congress. Berlandier's extensive knowledge of the region of south Texas and Tamaulipas, garnered from his field explorations to collect botanical specimens, was invaluable to General Arista.

After the Treaty of Guadalupe Hidalgo ended the fighting in February 1848, Berlandier was asked in 1850 to take part in the International Boundary Commission to define the border between Mexico and the United States. During the Mexican War he was placed in charge of the hospitals in Matamoros and served as an interpreter. In 1851 Berlandier drowned in the San Fernando River near Matamoros.

== Publications ==
- Berlandier, Jean-Louis. "Grossulariaciae," (an article on the gooseberry),

- published in the "Mémoires of the Society of Natural History of Geneva"; 1824.
- included in Auguste Pyrame DeCandolle's "Prodromus", a book on the plants of the world, 1826.

- Berlandier, Jean-Louis and Chovell, Rafael. "Diario de viaje de la Comisión de Límites." 1850.
- Berlandier, Jean-Louis (translated by Sheila M. Ohlendorf et al.) "Journey to Mexico during the Years 1826 to 1834. (in two volumes)." Texas State Historical Association, Austin, Texas, 1980.
- Berlandier, Jean-Louis (translated by Frank Mares) "Itinerario: Campaña de Palo Alto y Resaca de Guerrero." Yale University:Western America Collection MS S-310, 1846.
- Berlandier, Jean-Louis "Journal of Jean Louis Berlandier during 1846–1847, Including the Time When He Was Driven from Matamoros by the Americans." Thomas Phillips Collection, MS 15512 (Berlandier), Library of Congress, Washington, DC. Copy on file at the Arnulfo L. Oliveira Library, University of Texas at Brownsville.

== Manuscripts ==
Berlandier's manuscripts contain the only existing records of some languages of the Lower Rio Grande Valley, including Mamulique and Garza.

- Berlandier, Jean L.; & Chowell, Rafael (1828–1829). [Vocabularies of languages of south Texas and the lower Rio Grande]. (Additional manuscripts, no. 38720, in the British Library, London.)
- Berlandier, Jean L.; & Chowell, Rafael (1850). Luis Berlandier and Rafael Chovell. Diario de viage de la Commission de Limites. Mexico.

== Associated eponyms ==
Animals

- Rana berlandieri (Baird, 1859)
- Gopherus berlandieri Agassiz, 1857
- Taxidea taxus berlandieri Baird, 1858

Plants

- Abutilon berlandieri A.Gray ex S.Watson
- Acacia berlandieri Benth.
- Anemone berlandieri Pritz.
- Astragalus crassicarpus var. berlandieri Barneby
- Berlandiera DC.
- Citharexylum berlandieri B.L.Rob.
- Chenopodium berlandieri Moq.
- Echinocereus berlandieri (Engelm.) Haage f.
- Esenbeckia berlandieri Baill. ex Hemsl.
- Fraxinus berlandieriana DC.
- Linum berlandieri Hook.
- Lobelia berlandieri A.DC.
- Lycium berlandieri Dunal
- Oenothera berlandieri (Spach) Steud.
