= Watchmen (soundtrack) =

2019 soundtrack album

Watchmen (Music from the HBO Series)
- Cover of the digital version of Volume 1, consistent throughout all three Volumes

Soundtrack album by Trent Reznor and Atticus Ross
- Released: November 6, 2019 (Volume 1); November 27, 2019 (Volume 2); December 18, 2019 (Volume 3)
- Genres: Electronic; dark ambient; electro-industrial; experimental; jazz; blues
- Length: 37:05 (Volume 1); 38:25 (Volume 2); 47:08 (Volume 3)
- Labels: The Null Corporation; WaterTower Music
- Producers: Trent Reznor; Atticus Ross

Trent Reznor and Atticus Ross chronology
| Bird Box (2018) | Watchmen (Music from the HBO Series) (2019) | Waves (2019) |

Watchmen (Music from the HBO Series) is the original score for the HBO superhero drama limited series Watchmen, composed by Trent Reznor and Atticus Ross. The score was released in three volumes on vinyl and digital services over the course of the series' broadcast in 2019, with Volume 1 on November 6, Volume 2 on November 27, and Volume 3 on December 18.

Watchmen is Reznor and Ross' first collaborative soundtrack for scripted television following their work on a number of award-winning films (beginning with The Social Network in 2010), as well as the documentary series The Vietnam War in 2017. The score combines the duo's signature electronic and dark ambient sounds with jazz and blues compositions, a piano cover of David Bowie's "Life on Mars," and a number of interludes containing in-world content from the series' universe, including dialogue excerpts and fictional advertisements.

The score was critically acclaimed, with many reviewers considering it Reznor and Ross' best work to date. Particular praise was given to the album's stylistic range, as well as its role in crafting the series' distinct atmosphere. The score earned Reznor and Ross the Primetime Emmy Award for Outstanding Music Composition for a Limited Series, Movie or Special (Original Dramatic Score) in 2020.

== Background and composition ==
Following their experimental lean towards dark ambient on Ghosts I–IV (2008), composers Trent Reznor and Atticus Ross of the industrial rock band Nine Inch Nails have collaborated on scoring a number of successful films, beginning with soundtracks to David Fincher's three consecutive films including The Social Network (2010), The Girl with the Dragon Tattoo (2011), and Gone Girl (2014). The duo made their television debut with the score for the PBS documentary series The Vietnam War in 2017, but had never composed music for a scripted series prior to their work on Watchmen.

Reznor, a personal fan of both the original Watchmen comic series by Alan Moore and Dave Gibbons as well as the work of Damon Lindelof, creator of the television series, reached out to Lindelof offering to score the series alongside Ross after HBO greenlit the project; the duo were officially announced as the series' composers in September 2018. Reznor stated that he admired the creative risk Lindelof undertook in approaching the Watchmen property, remarking, "It would be a lot easier for Damon to make something that was not called Watchmen than it is to make something for fans that are unpleasable. (...) Just taking on the IP doesn't feel safe, so Atticus and I are all in with this show." The duo began composing the series' score after meetings with Lindelof in which he pitched them the series' concept and presented a rough cut of the pilot episode.

Reznor and Ross experimented with various styles and genres for the Watchmen soundtrack, combining their signature electronic and dark ambient sound with jazz, blues, and gospel influences. Reznor noted that some of the score's stylistic range was informed by the tonal shifts of the pilot script, which he and Ross read before filming had commenced. He remarked, "We'd read the script for the first episode, (...) and it was tough to tell, is the tone of this dead serious? Is it self-aware? Is there any humor? Is it pitch black? When we saw the first cut, which wasn't perfected yet, it really defined what it was. There's a playfulness to this, which we hadn't expected." The two created "about 12 pieces" based on the pilot script prior to viewing any footage from the series.

Several pieces on the album springboarded from the track "How the West Was Really Won," which was said to have "captivated" Lindelof. Ross stated that many pieces on the album were crafted using a similar approach to what he and Reznor took to their work as Nine Inch Nails, particularly on electronic tracks like "How the West Was Really Won" and "Nun With a Motherfucking Gun," which serves as the theme for protagonist Angela Abar/Sister Night. The duo also introduced orchestral elements for pieces containing in-universe content, such as the theme for the fictional series American Hero Story, which functioned both as a parody of the American Horror Story franchise as well as a way for Lindelof to lightheartedly "troll the Marvel movies," according to Ross.

Furthermore, Reznor and Ross incorporated the series' historical themes and period settings into the score, particularly on the track "The Way It Used to Be," a jazz composition inspired by music from the 1940s. The piece is used in the episode "This Extraordinary Being," which is largely set in the 1940s, during a sequence where a character is lynched; Reznor recalled that the producers initially intended to use a track by Doris Day for the sequence, but that the record's publishers denied their request due to the context of the scene. This led to Reznor and Ross composing an original, period-authentic track for the episode. Reznor noted that it was the first time he and Ross had attempted a jazz record. The duo additionally created a cover of David Bowie's "Life on Mars", which is used in the end credits for the episode "An Almost Religious Awe". Reznor, who was personal friends with Bowie prior to the latter's death in 2016, remarked that composing the cover was a daunting task, but that he and Ross were ultimately "very proud" of the end result. In addition to the Bowie cover, the track "No Rhythm" contains an interpolation of Wham!'s "Careless Whisper".

== Release ==
Covers of Watchmen vinyl editions

Rorschach-themed cover of Volume 1, designed as The Book of Rorschach by a fictional band the Sons of Pale Horse

Hooded Justice on the cover of Volume 2, as a fictional soundtrack to the "original series" American Hero Story: Minutemen

Doctor Manhattan on the cover of Volume 3, in the form of a fictional album The Manhattan Project, credited to "The Nine Inch Nails"

The score for Watchmen was released in three volumes over the series' broadcast, with a new volume released every three episodes. The three albums collectively span 39 tracks. The first volume was released on November 4, the second on November 25, and the third on December 16, 2019. Reznor reasoned that releasing all the tracks as part of one volume would exceed the "short attention span[s]" of general audiences, and that splitting the score into three volumes would allow it to "be part of the [series'] story."

The albums were released in both physical and digital formats, with the vinyl editions containing various pieces of faux artwork, track titles and credits referencing in-world content from the series, as well as supplemental material written by Lindelof and Jeff Jensen. On the vinyl versions, Volume 1 is credited to the in-universe band the Sons of Pale Horse, with the faux title The Book of Rorschach; Volume 2 is given the faux title Soundtrack to the Original Series American Hero Story: Minutemen (a show-within-a-show); while Volume 3 is given the faux title The Manhattan Project, packaged as "the final album" for a fictional band called The Nine Inch Nails [sic].

== Reception ==
=== Critical reception ===
Professional ratings
Review scores
| Source | Rating |
|---|---|
| Pitchfork | 7.6/10 |
| Consequence of Sound | A− |

The score for Watchmen received widespread acclaim from critics, who praised its stylistic diversity and its contribution to creating a distinct atmosphere for the series. Sean T. Collins of Pitchfork gave the record a 7.6 out of 10, calling it Reznor and Ross' "strongest and most direct" work since their score for The Social Network. Collins singled out "How the West Was Really Won," calling it the album's best track and praising the usage of its melody as a leitmotif in several other tracks on the album. He also remarked on how the three volumes display the duo's "considerable range" with tracks "alternately paranoid and plaintive." Angie Piccirillo of Consequence of Sound gave the album an A−, praising tracks like "Nun With a Motherfucking Gun" for utilizing the "iconic driving synths and electronic production that [Reznor and Ross] are known for." Piccirillo also praised the interlude monologues, such as "Garryowen" and "Trigger Warning", for providing "a backbone to the soundtrack as a whole, allowing for it to be able to tell the same story as the series — without even having to watch." She was less positive about tracks such as "The Brick" and "Absent Friends and Old Ghosts", which she felt represented the album's "expected moments of traditional underscore" and questioned their place on the record. James Whitbrook of io9 wrote that the score was "just oozing with style, a soundscape that is almost off-putting in the uneasy tension its rhythmic pacing evokes—and yet at the same time it's weirdly hypnotic, lulling you with a false sense of security with its slick beats (and even slicker basslines) as it burrows its way into your head."

=== Accolades ===
At the 72nd Primetime Creative Arts Emmy Awards, Reznor and Ross won the award for Outstanding Music Composition for a Limited Series for their work on Watchmen. Additionally, the track "The Way It Used to Be" was nominated for Outstanding Original Music and Lyrics. At the 2020 Society of Composers & Lyricists Awards, Reznor and Ross were nominated for Outstanding Original Score for a Television or Streaming Production.

== Track listing ==
All tracks written by Trent Reznor and Atticus Ross, except where noted.

=== Volume 1 ===
Watchmen: Volume 1 (Music from the HBO Series)
| No. | Title | Length |
|---|---|---|
| 1. | "How the West Was Really Won" | 3:44 |
| 2. | "Orphans of Krypton" | 1:56 |
| 3. | "Garryowen" | 1:17 |
| 4. | "Nun with a Motherf*&*ing Gun" | 3:17 |
| 5. | "Objects in Mirror (Are Closer than They Appear)" | 1:38 |
| 6. | "Kattle Battle" | 1:42 |
| 7. | "American Promo Story" | 0:48 |
| 8. | "I'll Wait" | 3:24 |
| 9. | "Trigger Warning" | 0:55 |
| 10. | "The Brick" | 4:01 |
| 11. | "Never Surrender" | 2:08 |
| 12. | "Müller Time" | 2:25 |
| 13. | "Owl Hunts Rat" | 2:37 |
| 14. | "Absent Friends and Old Ghosts" | 3:29 |
| 15. | "Watch Over This Boy" | 3:38 |
| Total length: | | 37:05 |

=== Volume 2 ===
Watchmen: Volume 2 (Music from the HBO Series)
| No. | Title | Length |
|---|---|---|
| 1. | "Trust in the Law" | 2:03 |
| 2. | "He Was Never Here" | 3:54 |
| 3. | "Kicked in the Balls Again" | 3:24 |
| 4. | "A Traveller from an Antique Land" | 4:22 |
| 5. | "Losing Face" | 1:22 |
| 6. | "Squid Pro Quo" | 3:27 |
| 7. | "Your Name Is Angela Abar" | 0:57 |
| 8. | "Nostalgia Blues" | 3:28 |
| 9. | "Pay No Attention to the Cactus" | 4:09 |
| 10. | "Seven Years of Bad Luck" | 2:19 |
| 11. | "The Dark Knut Returns" | 2:48 |
| 12. | "Ghraib Me a Terrorist" | 2:48 |
| 13. | "Dreamland Jazz" | 3:17 |
| Total length: | | 38:25 |

=== Volume 3 ===
Watchmen: Volume 3 (Music from the HBO Series)
| No. | Title | Length |
|---|---|---|
| 1. | "Doomsday Prepper" | 4:47 |
| 2. | "Clockmaker" | 3:49 |
| 3. | "A Man Walks Into an Intrinsic Field" | 1:34 |
| 4. | "Splice of Life" | 0:36 |
| 5. | "No Rhythm" | 1:06 |
| 6. | "The Waiting Sky" | 3:56 |
| 7. | "The Way It Used to Be" | 3:41 |
| 8. | "The Elephant in the Room" | 1:08 |
| 9. | "Worthy of the Badge" | 2:05 |
| 10. | "Which Came First" | 2:18 |
| 11. | "Stupid Panties" | 3:45 |
| 12. | "A Stronger, Loving World" | 3:55 |
| 13. | "Nothing Ever Ends" | 7:23 |
| 14. | "Lincoln Tunnel" | 4:04 |
| 15. | "Life on Mars?" (David Bowie) | 2:53 |
| Total length: | | 47:08 |

Notes

- All tracks are stylized in all caps. For example, "The Brick" is stylized as "THE BRICK".
- "Garryowen" features a recorded message by the series' antagonists, the white supremacist organization the Seventh Kavalry, in the episode "It's Summer and We're Running Out of Ice".
- "American Promo Story" features an advertisement for the fictional television series American Hero Story: Minutemen.
- "Trigger Warning" features an elaborate fictional FCC content warning read out by broadcasters prior to airing of American Hero Story episodes.
- "Your Name Is Angela Abar" is an excerpt of dialogue from Cal Abar, played by Yahya Abdul-Mateen II, in the episode "This Extraordinary Being".
- "A Man Walks Into an Intrinsic Field" features narration from a documentary about the life of Jon Osterman/Doctor Manhattan.
- "The Way It Used to Be" contains vocals by Laura Dickinson.
- "The Elephant in the Room" features a PSA from Trieu Pharmaceuticals about the effects of the drug "Nostalgia", narrated by Hong Chau as Lady Trieu.

Sample credits

- "No Rhythm" contains an interpolation of "Careless Whisper", written by George Michael and Andrew Ridgeley and originally performed by Wham!

== Personnel ==
Credits adapted from the album's liner notes.

Musicians

- Trent Reznor: performer, programming, arranging, producer
- Atticus Ross: performer, programming, arranging, producer, mixer
- Mike Garson: piano on "Trust in the Law"
- John Beasley: piano on "Nostalgia Blues" and "Dreamland Jazz"
- Keith Fiddmont: saxophone on "Nostalgia Blues" and "Dreamland Jazz"
- Chuck Berghofer: double bass on "Nostalgia Blues" and "Dreamland Jazz"
- Peter Erskine: drums on "Nostalgia Blues" and "Dreamland Jazz"
- Laura Dickinson: vocals on "The Way It Used to Be"
- Dan Higgins: producer on "The Way It Used to Be"

Technical

- Kyle Hoffmann: engineer
- Tommy Simpson: engineer
- Mat Mitchell: engineer
- Chris Richardson: engineer
- Sally Boldt: series music editor
- Nick Chuba: additional arrangements
- Austin Creek: engineer on "Trust in the Law"
- Tommy Vicari: engineer on "Nostalgia Blues" and "Dreamland Jazz"
- Rich Breen: engineer and mixing on "The Way It Used to Be"
- Jeff Jensen: writing and world building (vinyl only)
- Damon Lindelof: writing and world building (vinyl only)

== Chart positions ==
Sales chart performance for Watchmen: Volume 1
| Chart (2019) | Peak position |
|---|---|
| UK Soundtrack Albums (Official Charts) | 22 |
| US Top Album Sales (Billboard) | 62 |
| US Soundtrack Albums (Billboard) | 21 |
| US Indie Store Album Sales (Billboard) | 15 |
| US Vinyl Albums (Billboard) | 15 |
