= Watchmen (TV series) =

2019 American superhero drama television series

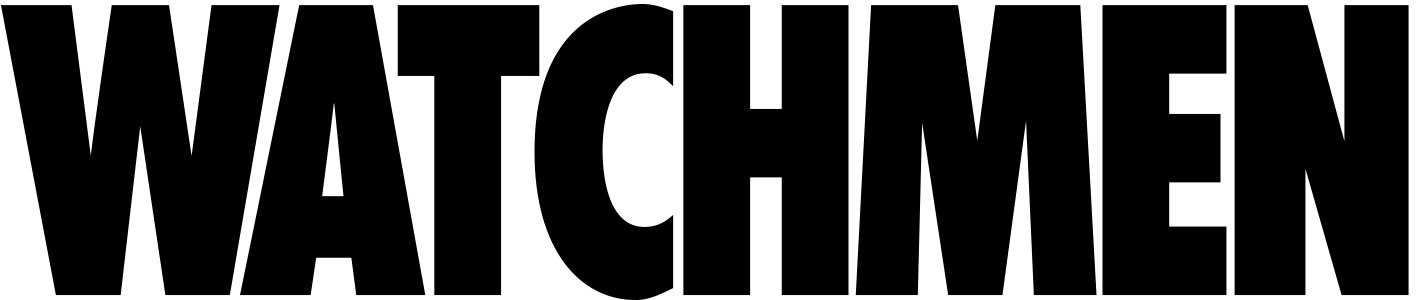
- Genre: Drama; Dystopia; Superhero
- Created by: Damon Lindelof
- Based on: Watchmen by: Alan Moore (uncredited); Dave Gibbons
- Showrunner: Damon Lindelof
- Starring: Regina King; Don Johnson; Tim Blake Nelson; Yahya Abdul-Mateen II; Andrew Howard; Jacob Ming-Trent; Tom Mison; Sara Vickers; Dylan Schombing; Louis Gossett Jr.; Jeremy Irons; Jean Smart; Hong Chau
- Music by: Trent Reznor; Atticus Ross
- Country of origin: United States
- Original language: English
- No. of episodes: 9

Production
- Executive producers: Damon Lindelof; Tom Spezialy; Nicole Kassell; Stephen Williams; Joseph E. Iberti
- Producers: Karen Wacker; John Blair
- Production locations: United States; Wales
- Cinematography: Alex Disenhof; Xavier Pérez Grobet; Gregory Middleton; Andrij Parekh; Chris Seager
- Editors: David Eisenberg; Anna Hauger; Henk Van Eeghen
- Running time: 52–67 minutes
- Production companies: White Rabbit; Paramount Television; DC Entertainment; Warner Bros. Television

Original release
- Network: HBO
- Release: October 20 – December 15, 2019

Watchmen is a 2019 American superhero limited series created by Damon Lindelof for HBO. The series is written as a sequel to the 1986 DC Comics series Watchmen, created by Alan Moore and Dave Gibbons. Its ensemble cast includes Regina King, Don Johnson, Tim Blake Nelson, Yahya Abdul-Mateen II, Andrew Howard, Jacob Ming-Trent, Tom Mison, Sara Vickers, Dylan Schombing, Louis Gossett Jr. and Jeremy Irons. Jean Smart and Hong Chau joined the cast in later episodes.

Lindelof likened the television series to a "remix" of the original comic series. While the series is technically a sequel that takes place 34 years after the events of the comics within the same alternate reality, Lindelof wanted to introduce new characters and conflicts which created a new story within the Watchmen continuity, rather than creating a reboot. The series focuses on events surrounding racist violence in present-day Tulsa, Oklahoma. A white supremacist group called the Seventh Kavalry has taken up arms against the Tulsa Police Department because of perceived racial injustices, causing the police to conceal their identities with masks to prevent the Seventh Kavalry from targeting them in their homes following the "White Night". Angela Abar (portrayed by King), a detective known as Sister Night, investigates the murder of her friend and the chief of the police, Judd Crawford (Johnson), and discovers secrets regarding the situations around vigilantism.

The series, promoted by HBO as an ongoing drama series, premiered on October 20, 2019, before concluding its nine-episode run on December 15. Lindelof left his role as showrunner after the first season, stating that he had completed his intended story. HBO subsequently confirmed there are no further plans for the show to continue without Lindelof returning in some capacity, and reclassified the work as a limited series with possible future installments.

Watchmen received critical acclaim for its performances, writing, visuals, score, and expansion of the source material, as well as commendation for highlighting the 1921 Tulsa race massacre. The series received 11 awards at the 72nd Primetime Emmy Awards – the most for any show in 2020.

== Premise ==
The series is set in Tulsa, Oklahoma, in 2019, 34 years after the events of the comic series. In the comic's alternate history of the 20th century, vigilantes, once seen as heroes, were outlawed due to their violent methods.

In 1985, Adrian Veidt, formerly known as the vigilante Ozymandias, launched a false flag attack on New York City by creating an alien-looking squid monster which would die with a devastating psychic scream, and teleporting it into a densely occupied area, which resulted in millions in the New York area being killed, forcing nations to work together against what they believed to be a common alien threat, averting world war and a nuclear holocaust. Veidt's actions horrified his former companions, with Rorschach planning to tell the world what really happened before being vaporized by Doctor Manhattan, who then left the planet. Unbeknownst to Manhattan, Rorschach had already sent his journal detailing the events to the local newspaper.

On Christmas Eve 2016, the Seventh Kavalry, a white supremacist group inspired by Rorschach's writings and masked image, attacked the homes of 40 police officers working for the Tulsa Police Department.

Of those who survived, only two stayed with the force: Detective Angela Abar and Police Chief Judd Crawford. As the police force was rebuilt, laws were passed that required police to not disclose their profession and to protect their identities while on the job by wearing masks, which included allowing for costumed police officers.

In 2019, as Crawford's police force attempts to crack down on the Seventh Kavalry, Abar finds herself at the center of two competing plots to kidnap Doctor Manhattan, who has been working with Hooded Justice, the original masked hero and survivor of the Tulsa massacre.

== Cast and characters ==
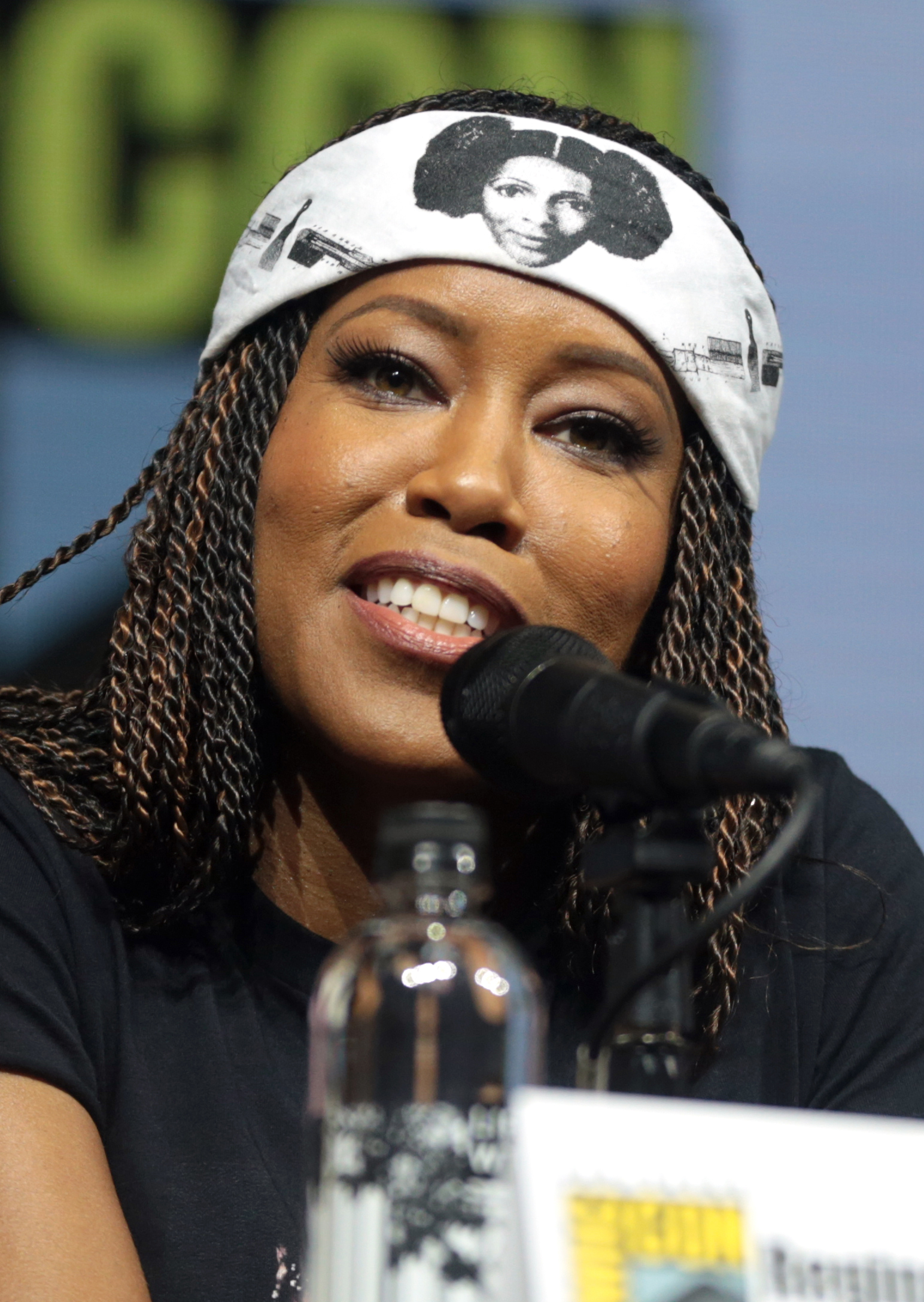
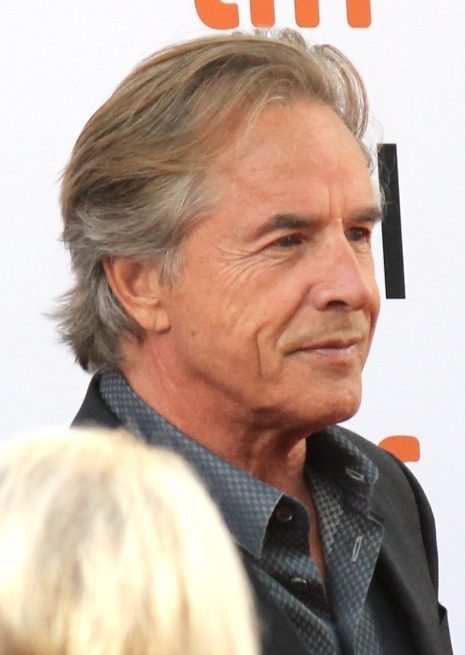
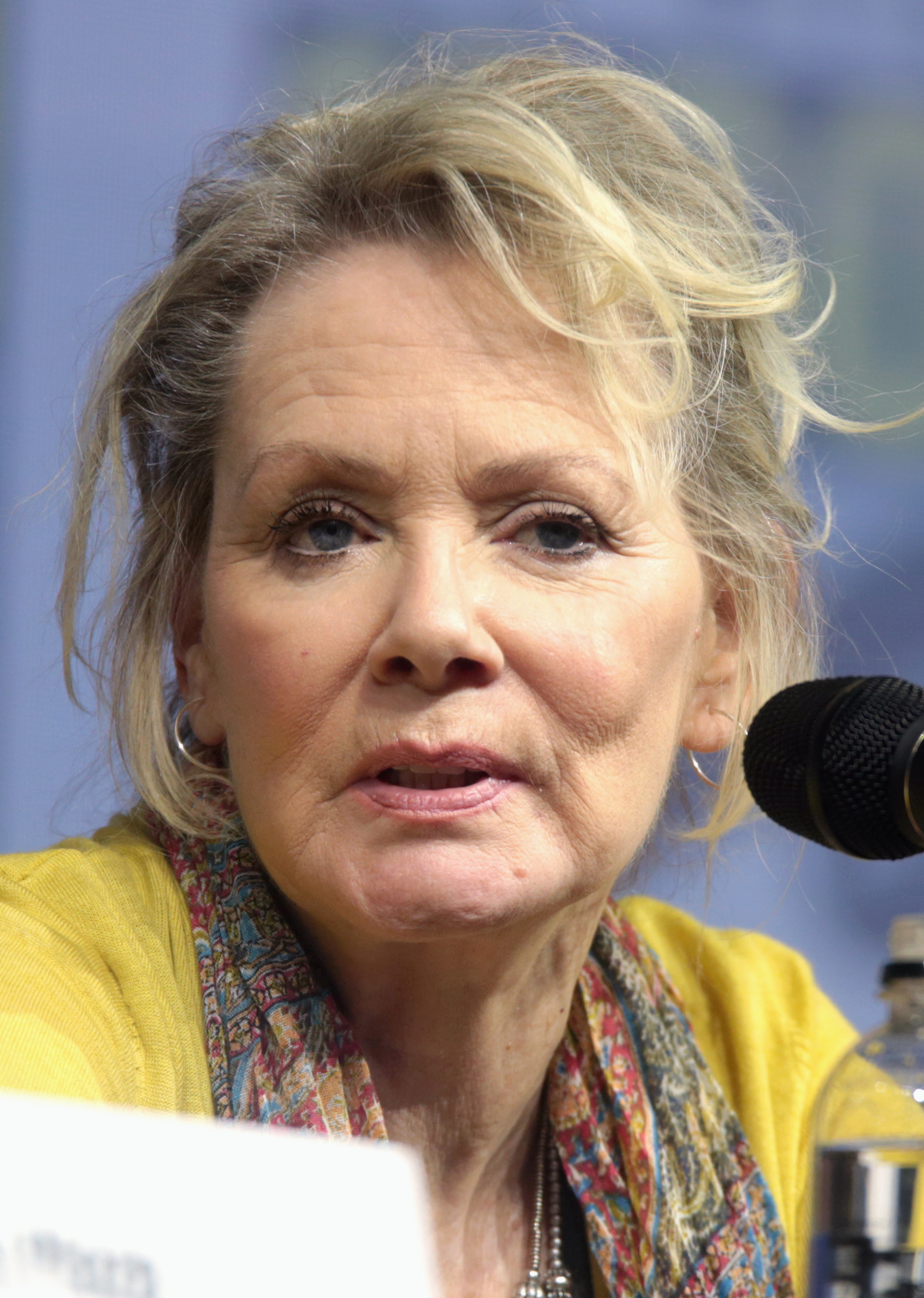
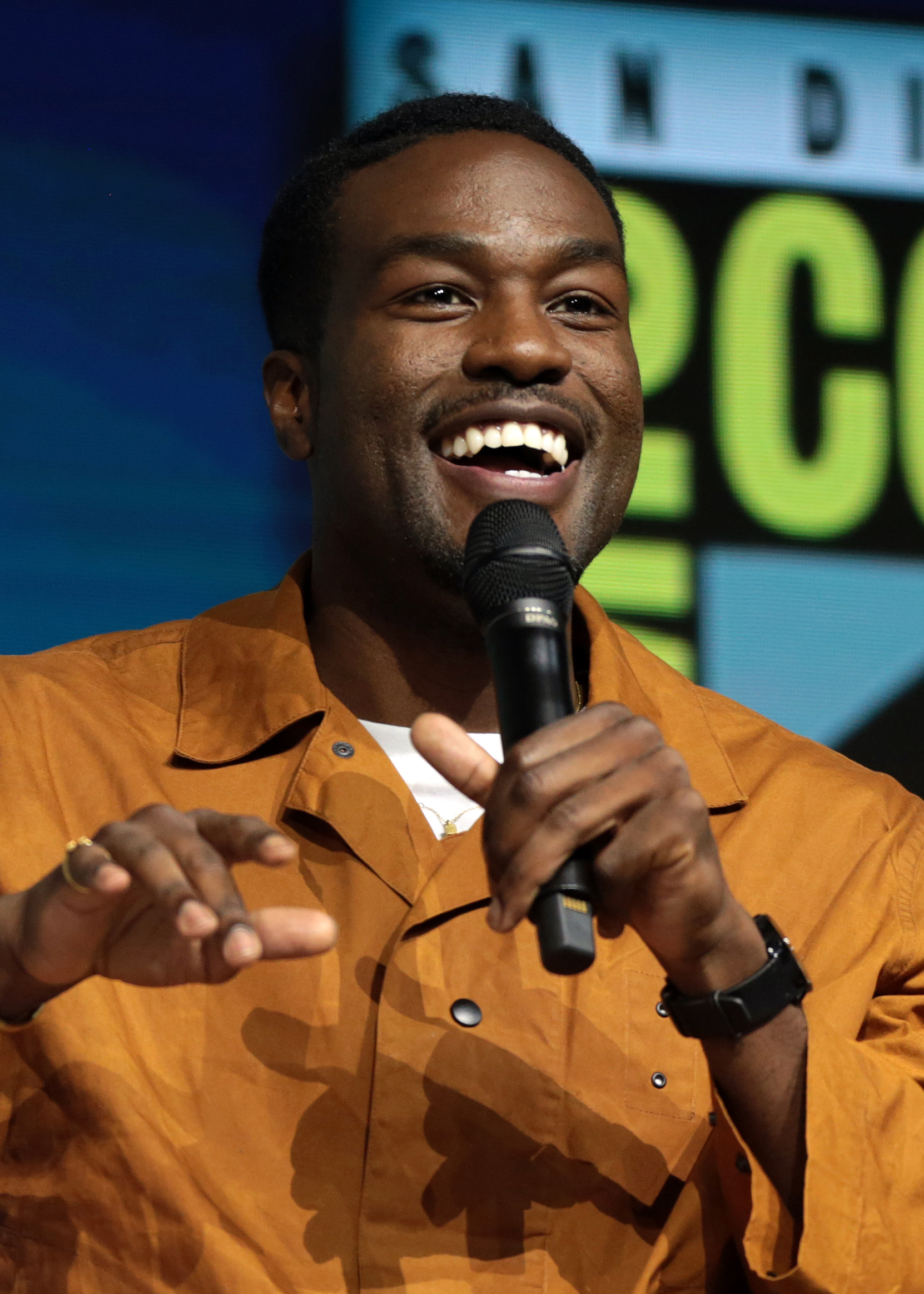
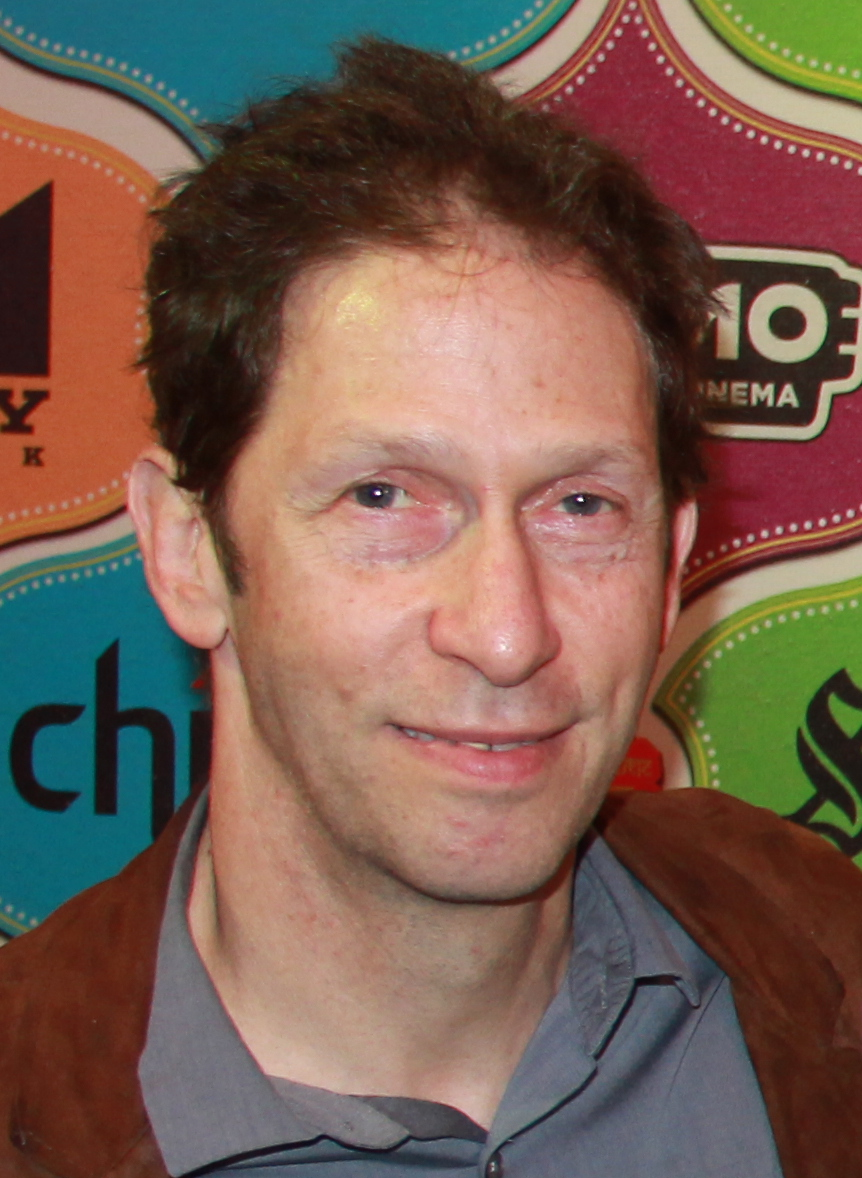
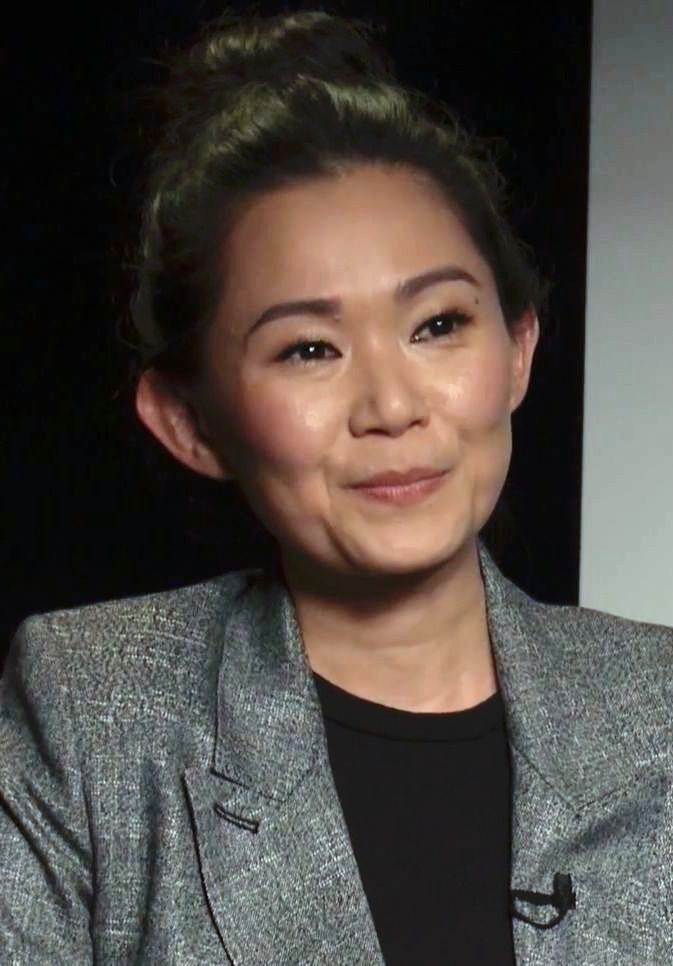
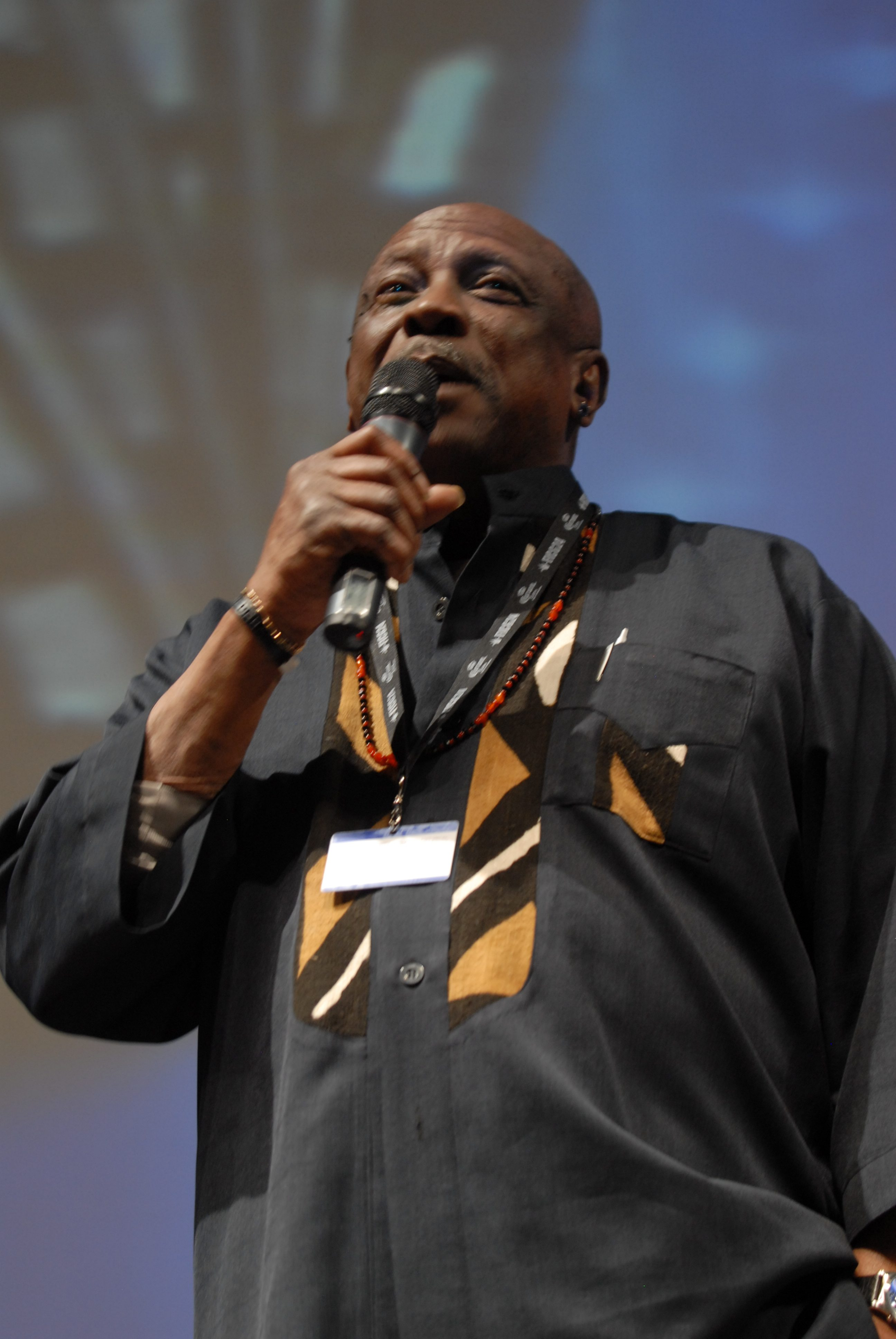
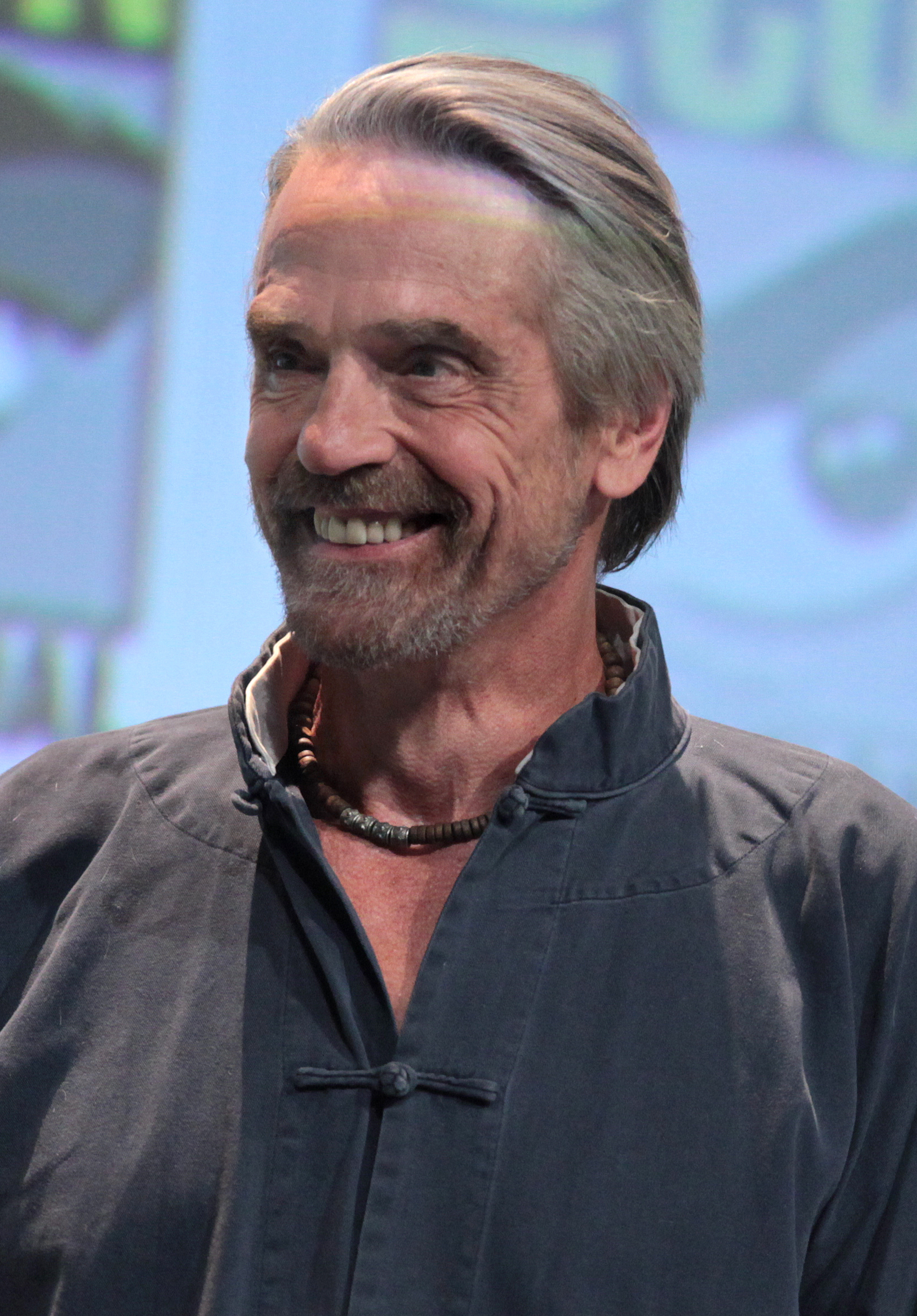
The principal cast for Watchmen includes (top row, left to right) Regina King, Don Johnson, Jean Smart, Yahya Abdul-Mateen II, (bottom row, left to right) Tim Blake Nelson, Hong Chau, Louis Gossett Jr., and Jeremy Irons.

=== Main ===
- Regina King as Angela Abar / Sister Night, a Tulsa Police detective who wears a nun's habit and a balaclava. Faithe Herman portrays a young Angela Abar.
- Don Johnson (Note: Johnson is credited with the main cast in the first and sixth episodes and is credited as a guest star in episodes two and seven.) as Judd Crawford, the chief of the Tulsa Police.
- Tim Blake Nelson as Wade Tillman / Looking Glass, a Tulsa Police detective who wears a reflective mask. Philip Labes portrays a teenage Wade.
- Yahya Abdul-Mateen II as Cal Abar, Angela's husband who is revealed to be a form of Jonathan Osterman / Doctor Manhattan. Darrell Snedeger portrays Manhattan's original form in a portrait at Laurie Blake's apartment and Zak Rothera-Oxley portrays a young Jon Osterman.
- Andrew Howard as Red Scare, a Tulsa Police detective who wears a predominantly red outfit and speaks with a Russian accent.
- Jacob Ming-Trent as Panda, a Tulsa Police detective who wears a full giant panda mask.
- Tom Mison as Mr. Phillips, a series of male clones of the original Mr. Phillips, created by Doctor Manhattan to serve as Veidt's servants.
  - Mison also portrays the Game Warden, a mysterious and powerful clone of the original Mr. Phillips who keeps Veidt in line and serves as his archenemy.
- Sara Vickers as Ms. Crookshanks, a series of female clones of the original Mrs. Crookshanks created by Doctor Manhattan to serve as Veidt's servants.
- Dylan Schombing as Topher Abar, Angela's and Cal's adopted son whose biological parents, the Doyles, were killed on the White Night.
- Louis Gossett Jr. as Will Reeves, Angela's grandfather, formerly known as Hooded Justice, the first masked hero who inspired the Minutemen. Jovan Adepo portrays a young Will Reeves.
- Jeremy Irons as Adrian Veidt, a former businessman and the vigilante Ozymandias, the "smartest man in the world". He is now living as an aristocratic lord of a country manor that is revealed to be on Europa.
- Jean Smart as Laurie Blake, formerly the second Silk Spectre, who has since become an FBI agent and member of the Anti-Vigilante Task Force.
- Hong Chau as Lady Trieu, the owner of Trieu Industries, a corporation that bought out Veidt Enterprises following news of his death, and later revealed to be Veidt's daughter by artificial insemination. Trieu's name is inspired by Vietnamese historical legend Lady Triệu.

=== Recurring ===
- James Wolk as Joe Keene Jr., a senator and leader of the Seventh Kavalry who aims to become president. His father is responsible for the Keene Act banning masked vigilantism.
- Frances Fisher as Jane Crawford, Judd's wife who is a member of the Seventh Kavalry.
- Jessica Camacho as Pirate Jenny, a member of the Tulsa police who wears a pirate-inspired outfit
- Adelynn Spoon as Emma Abar, Angela and Cal's younger adopted daughter.
- Lily Rose Smith as Rosie Abar, Angela and Cal's older adopted daughter.
- Steven G. Norfleet as O. B. Williams, the late father of Will Reeves and great-grandfather of Angela Abar.
- Alexis Louder as Ruth Williams, the late mother of Will Reeves and great-grandmother of Angela Abar.
- Jolie Hoang-Rappaport as Bian, a young clone of Trieu's mother passed off as her daughter.
  - Elyse Dinh portrays Trieu's mother, the original Bian as an adult.

=== Guest starring ===
- Dustin Ingram as Agent Dale Petey, an FBI agent who joins Laurie in investigating a murder in Tulsa. He is secretly a vigilante known as Lube Man.
- Cheyenne Jackson as an actor portraying Hooded Justice on American Hero Story.
- Henry Louis Gates Jr. as himself, in the position of Secretary of the Treasury.
- Jim Beaver as Andy, the Doyle children's paternal grandfather.
- Lee Tergesen as Mister Shadow, a vigilante who is drawn out by Laurie Blake.
- David Andrews as Deputy Director Max Farragut, Laurie Blake and Dale Petey's superior.
- Michael Imperioli as himself, appearing in an advertisement for New York City.
- Chris Whitley as an actor who portrays Captain Metropolis in American Hero Story.
- Eileen Grubba as Cynthia Bennett, Wade's ex-wife.
- Paula Malcomson as Renee, a radiologist who is a member of the Seventh Kavalry.
- Jake McDorman as Nelson Gardner / Captain Metropolis, one of the founding members of the New Minutemen.
- Glenn Fleshler as Fred, a racist shopkeeper who runs afoul of Will.
- Danielle Deadwyler as June, Will's wife and Angela's grandmother who works as a reporter. Valeri Ross portrays an older June.
- Anthony Hill as Marcus Abar, the father of Angela Abar who is killed by a suicide bomber.
- Devyn A. Taylor as Elise Abar, the mother of Angela Abar who is killed by a suicide bomber.
- Ted Johnson as Joe Keene Sr., the senator who passed the Keene Act, father of Joe Keene Jr., and member of Cyclops.

== Episodes ==
No.	Title	Directed by	Written by	Original release date	Prod. code	U.S. viewers (millions)
1	"It's Summer and We're Running Out of Ice"	Nicole Kassell	Damon Lindelof	October 20, 2019	101	0.799
During Tulsa's Black Wall Street massacre in 1921, a black child loses his parents O.B. and Ruth in the chaos and escorts an orphaned baby to safety. Ninety-eight years later, masked Officer Charlie Sutton is hospitalized after being shot by a member of the Seventh Kavalry, a white supremacist group. Chief Judd Crawford calls for retaliation to hunt down the shooter. Angela Abar hears of the shooting and hunts down a suspect under her secret persona, Sister Night. With help from another costumed officer, Wade Tillman / Looking Glass, Angela elicits the shooter's location at a cattle ranch used by the Kavalry. Angela, Judd, and other officers hunt them down, instigating a shootout that results in the deaths of all Kavalry members present, including the shooter. Later, Judd runs over a spike strip while driving to the hospital to visit Sutton. Angela receives a call from someone who instructs her to find something at a countryside tree. She heads to the location and finds an elderly black man in a wheelchair below a hanged Judd. Meanwhile, an old lord living at an unspecified country estate writes a play called The Watchmaker's Son and celebrates an "anniversary" with his two servants.
2	"Martial Feats of Comanche Horsemanship"	Nicole Kassell	Damon Lindelof & Nick Cuse	October 27, 2019	102	0.765
In World War I, O.B., a soldier in the American army, pockets a piece of German propaganda challenging their racial equality. In the present, Angela takes the elderly man she found under the tree to her hideout. He says his name is Will and claims to be her grandfather, which she later validates. The police round up several suspects from Nixonville on suspicion of Judd's lynching. Will warns Angela of Judd's duplicity, which she initially doubts. During Judd's wake however, while searching his house, she discovers a Ku Klux Klan outfit in a secret closet. She asks Will how he knew, to no avail, so she arrests him. As she places him in her car, a flying craft drops an electromagnet and takes the vehicle away with Will inside, dropping the propaganda his father had given him. Meanwhile, the lord watches his servants Mr. Phillips and Ms. Crookshanks perform his play: a retelling of Doctor Manhattan's origins. The lord incinerates Phillips as part of the play and names one of his other servants—apparent clones of Phillips and Crookshanks—the new "Mr. Phillips".
3	"She Was Killed by Space Junk"	Stephen Williams	Damon Lindelof & Lila Byock	November 3, 2019	103	0.648
After faking a bank robbery to draw out the vigilante Mister Shadow, Agent Laurie Blake of the FBI's Anti-Vigilante Task Force is asked by both the FBI and Senator Joe Keene Jr. to investigate Judd's murder. Laurie tracks down the Tulsa police rounding up Kavalry suspects and learns about Judd's funeral, where she makes contact with Angela. A Kavalry member wearing a suicide vest attempts to seize Joe, but Laurie kills him while Angela saves the other attendees. Later, Laurie talks to Angela, discussing the wheelchair treads at Judd's lynching and Judd's secret closet; warning her not to protect Judd. That night, Laurie uses a special phone booth to tell Doctor Manhattan a "brick joke" while he is on Mars. As she leaves, Angela's empty car drops in front of her. She looks up, sees Mars, and laughs. Meanwhile, the lord unsuccessfully tests a protective suit with a Phillips clone. He hunts down a bison for its thicker hide, but is stopped by the "Game Warden", who later writes to remind him of the terms of his imprisonment. The lord responds in a letter acknowledging these terms, signing it as Adrian Veidt and goes out to hunt again in his Ozymandias outfit.
4	"If You Don't Like My Story, Write Your Own"	Andrij Parekh	Damon Lindelof & Christal Henry	November 10, 2019	104	0.707
Lady Trieu buys out the farmland of an Oklahoma couple just moments before an object from space crashes onto their property to claim ownership of it. Angela learns about Will's parents at the heritage center, when she hears her car crash outside and meets Laurie, finding Will's pill bottle still inside. Later, Angela leaves the pill bottle and Judd's KKK outfit with Wade, and fails to capture an unknown vigilante who witnessed her dispose of Will's wheelchair. Laurie finds Will's fingerprints in Angela's car, as well as a connection to Trieu's facility at the Millennium Clock. Trieu provides them with a list of people with access to new lightweight drones, and in Vietnamese, tells Angela that Will wonders if she got the pill bottle. That evening, Trieu talks to Will about being upfront with Angela, but with events to come to a head in a few days, he would rather she figure it out herself. Meanwhile, Veidt collects fetuses from a lake to grow new clones of Phillips and Crookshanks after killing off all of the existing ones. With their help, Veidt launches the dead bodies with a catapult to test the limits of his prison.
5	"Little Fear of Lightning"	Steph Green	Damon Lindelof & Carly Wray	November 17, 2019	105	0.752
Wade suffers PTSD as a survivor of Veidt's 1985 squid attack. Laurie bugs Wade's desk, and learns that Angela asked him about the pills. Wade's ex-wife, Cynthia, tells him the pills are Nostalgia, which contain other people's memories. The Kavalry lure Wade to a warehouse, where they are testing a teleportation portal. Joe explains both he and Judd are Kavalry members trying to keep them in check. Joe coerces Wade's help to learn what Angela knows about Judd's death after showing him a video Veidt made a day before the 1985 attack and addressed to future President Redford, explaining his long-term plan; shaking Wade to his core. At the station the next day, Wade gets Angela to state that her grandfather was behind Judd's death. Laurie hears this and arrests Angela, but not before she ingests the pills. Wade returns home after work and Kavalry members arrive with guns. It is revealed that Veidt's prison is on a moon of Jupiter as he arranges servants' frozen bodies to spell out "Save Me" so they will be visible to a passing space probe. However, he is pulled back into the prison and arrested by the Game Warden.
6	"This Extraordinary Being"	Stephen Williams	Damon Lindelof & Cord Jefferson	November 24, 2019	106	0.620
Laurie tries to get Angela to agree to treatment before the Nostalgia kicks in, but the latter starts experiencing her grandfather's memories. In 1938, Will joins the New York Police Department, which is rife with racism. After he discovers a plot called "Cyclops", his fellow white officers beat him and hang him from a tree, cutting him down at the last moment to warn him not to interfere in white affairs. While walking home, he puts back on the hood the white police had put on him when they hanged him, and he fights off men attacking a young couple. He is called a hero the next day and, supported by his wife June, he takes on the persona of "Hooded Justice". Will is invited to join the Minutemen by Captain Metropolis and begins an affair with him while June becomes pregnant. When Will finds that "Cyclops" is a plan by the KKK to hypnotize black people to incite riots among themselves, Will asks for the Minutemen's help in foiling the plot, but Captain Metropolis refuses. Enraged, Will dismantles the operation on his own, killing all involved. June, shocked by Will's consuming anger, leaves him and takes their son "home" to Tulsa. In the near-present, Will uses a modified form of the hypnotic technology to make Judd hang himself. Angela wakes up in Trieu's compound, and finds that Trieu has been treating her for the Nostalgia overdose.
7	"An Almost Religious Awe"	David Semel	Stacy Osei-Kuffour & Claire Kiechel	December 1, 2019	107	0.779
Angela continues to be treated for the Nostalgia as her memories of losing her parents and her grandmother June in Vietnam mingled with Will's. She also learns that the Manhattan phone booths supposedly connected to Mars route to Trieu's facilities before Trieu herself says that Manhattan is on Earth, in Tulsa, disguised as a human. After learning of the Kavalry's plan to destroy Manhattan to become like him and restore white supremacy, Trieu plans to activate the Millennium Clock within the hour to save the world. Angela breaks free, rushes home, and tells Cal she loves him as a husband – calling him by the name Jon – before bashing his head in and pulling out a small disc shaped like Manhattan's symbol, causing his body to glow blue. Laurie goes to speak to Jane Crawford about her husband's death, but falls into a trap door and is taken to the Kavalry's headquarters. Laurie's partner Petey tries to track down Wade, finding his fallout shelter filled with dead Kavalrymen, but no sign of him. Meanwhile, Veidt is put on a year-long trial by the Game Warden, which he treats as a farce.
8	"A God Walks into Abar"	Nicole Kassell	Jeff Jensen & Damon Lindelof	December 8, 2019	108	0.822
In Vietnam 2009, Doctor Manhattan approaches Angela and convinces her that he is not an impostor by creating an egg out of thin air. He attempts to convince Angela to have dinner with him the next night, as they will fall in love later. Angela is skeptical, but Manhattan, after explaining his non-linear experience with time, reveals that he had been creating life on Europa since 1985, and that in 2019, he will fall in love with her just as he is about to be taken by the Seventh Kavalry. He explains how he took up the identity of Cal to blend in, and used a device created by Veidt to give himself amnesia about his true identity until it was necessary for Angela to remove it. At Veidt's request, Manhattan transported him to Europa, and also visited Will to encourage him to help Angela in 2019. Angela, speaking to Manhattan in 2019, asks him to ask Will in 2009 how he knew of Judd's secrets, but realizes she gave that idea to Will just now. As the Kavalry prepare to attack, Angela goes to protect Manhattan, who sees this as the moment he fell in love with her, and helps her fend them off; knowing one last Kavalry member remained alive to use a tachyon cannon to capture him. In 2009, Angela accepts Manhattan's dinner proposal. In a post-credits scene, the Game Warden gives a captive Veidt another anniversary cake after the clones give him a public humiliation. Veidt finds a horseshoe baked inside and gleefully starts digging an escape tunnel.
9	"See How They Fly"	Frederick E.O. Toye	Nick Cuse & Damon Lindelof	December 15, 2019	109	0.935
Veidt, having written "Save Me Daughter" on Europa, is picked up in Trieu's spacecraft. Trieu wants her father and Bian, a clone of her mother, present when she activates a machine she developed to steal Manhattan's power for herself. The Kavalry, working with the Cyclops leaders, capture Manhattan while Joe prepares to take his powers. Laurie discovers Wade is alive, disguised as a Kavalry member. Just as the Kavalry activate their system, Trieu teleports the setup to downtown Tulsa, finding Joe has dissolved into ooze and kills the Cyclops leaders. Before Trieu kills him, Manhattan uses the distraction to teleport Veidt, Laurie, and Wade to Karnak, where Veidt reworks his squid-rain system to send frozen squid to pulverize Trieu's device; killing Trieu in the process. Angela takes shelter in the theater where Will and her children are, where Will explains Manhattan had worked with him to bring about this necessary conclusion. Laurie and Wade bring Veidt to justice using a copy of the 1985 video. While cleaning up eggs from the night before, Angela recalls Manhattan's statement about transferring his powers through an organic medium. Finding one unbroken egg, Angela eats it and attempts to walk on water as she saw Manhattan do the night before.

== Production ==
=== Development ===
Rumors of a potential Watchmen television series adaptation first came about in October 2015, with HBO in preliminary discussions with Zack Snyder, who directed the 2009 film adaptation of the original graphic novel. HBO later confirmed that they were seeking to develop a Watchmen series in November 2015.

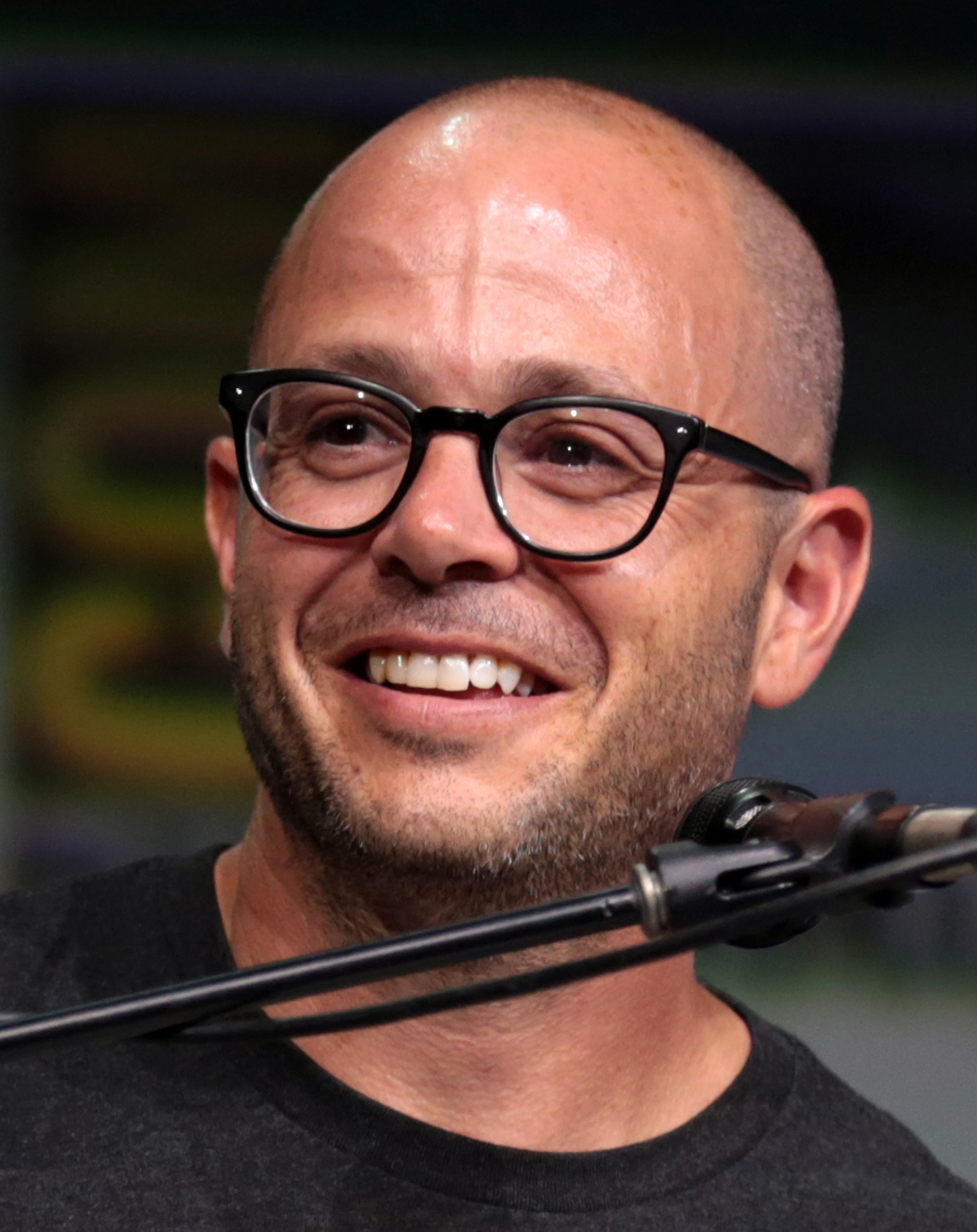
Damon Lindelof serves as creator and writer of the TV series.

By June 2017, HBO had begun negotiations with Damon Lindelof, as Snyder was no longer involved with the production. According to Lindelof, he had been long interested in making a Watchmen work since he read the comic as a teenager, and had been approached to write it at least twice before, but rejected the offers as they came out shortly following Snyder's film and felt he could not improve on that. In the interim, he developed the HBO series The Leftovers that ran from 2014 to 2017. The Leftovers was met with high acclaim, and led to yet another offer to write a Watchmen series, which Lindelof then accepted.

Writing for the series started on September 19, 2017. The following day, HBO officially greenlit the production for a pilot and additional backup scripts as well. Nicole Kassell was announced as the director and executive producer for the Lindelof pilot on January 30, 2018. The pilot was filmed around June 2018 in locations around Atlanta, Georgia.

On August 17, 2018, HBO greenlit a full season of Watchmen, scheduling the premiere in 2019. Due to the time between filming the pilot and the remaining episodes, a new production crew had been brought on board, and Kassell remained the director for the second episode to provide necessary continuity. The series' premiere date, October 20, 2019, was announced on September 3, 2019.

The show's credits identify the work as based on characters co-created by Dave Gibbons, who along with Alan Moore created the Watchmen comic. Due to multiple disputes with DC Comics and the producers of previous films, Moore has asked for his name to be no longer associated with any film production of his works from that period, including for the Watchmen film. Gibbons, however, was an active contributor to the show, providing illustrations in the same style as the original comic series. Lindelof tried to reach out to Moore to get his blessing for the show, but was rebuffed. In 2022, Moore claimed Lindelof had sent him a letter that he described as "neurotic rambling", including Lindelof identifying himself as "one of the bastards currently destroying Watchmen". Moore said he replied with a request to not contact him as he did not wish to be associated with the adaptation.

=== Writing ===
External image
- Damon Lindelof's open letter to Watchmen fans on creating the television series, posted to Instagram on May 22, 2018

Lindelof stated that his vision for the series was to be a "remix" of the comic series. While the show is a sequel to the comic, he wanted to make a story of his own that felt part of that universe without creating a reboot, and made sure that this was apparent from the first episode. He affirmed this idea in an open letter to fans posted on May 22, 2018.

One of the first challenges for Lindelof was determining what the focus of the narrative would be. He considered that at the time the original Watchmen comic was released, it reflected on the public anxiety over the ongoing Cold War. In looking for a similar anxiety for contemporary times, Lindelof determined that racial tensions posed the same type of larger picture that would work well for the Watchmen universe, since it presented both historical and present conflicts. He also felt "to not tell a story about race in the context of a political text in 2019 almost felt borderline irresponsible". Establishing racism as a central theme, Lindelof assembled a purposely-diverse writing staff, with half the writers being black, and half being female, to help provide proper perspective towards these issues.

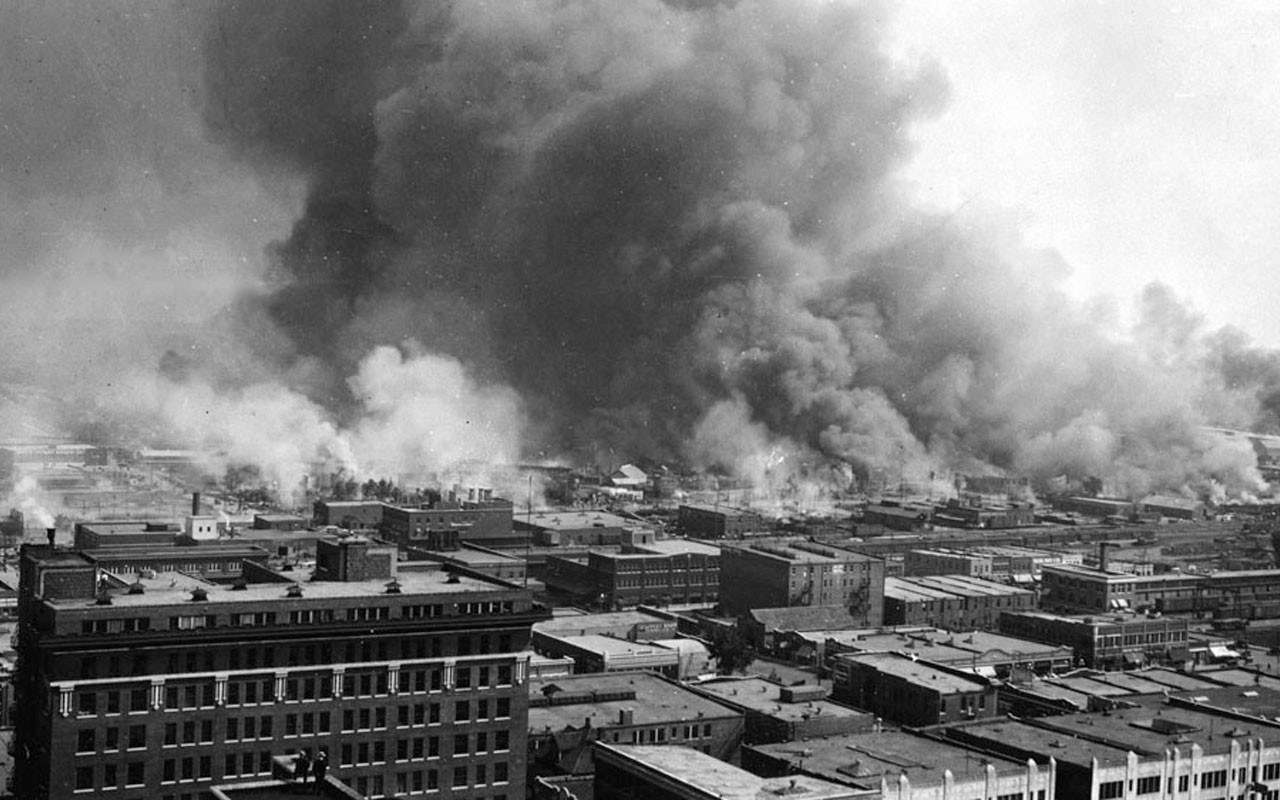
The 1921 Tulsa race massacre in the Greenwood district, which resulted in the deaths of over 150 black people, was a central moment in Watchmen's narrative.

Lindelof opted to open the pilot on the 1921 Tulsa race massacre, an event that he became aware of after reading The Atlantic article "The Case for Reparations" written by Ta-Nehisi Coates in 2014. Lindelof, curious about the massacre, found there was very little information about it, and strove to learn more. Many aspects of the plot center on the legacy of the graphic novel and the event. This was around the time that he had been approached again to write for the Watchmen series, and felt the massacre and its implication for the alternate reality's present would provide an equivalent factor that the Doomsday Clock had been for the original comic series, and used racial conflict as a central element of the series. He believed it would also help more people learn about the 1921 event, and made sure it was represented accurately, including the representation in how aerial attacks were used to bombard the Greenwood district.

Lindelof had conceived of Angela as the central character that everything revolves around, with the discovery that her grandfather Will, a black man, was one of the first costumed heroes, Hooded Justice, shown only in a few panels from the original comics. Hooded Justice's identity was never established in the original comic series, and Lindelof's suggestion that he was a black man created a challenge for the writers. One of the first tasks the writing staff had was to determine how Will would become Hooded Justice, effectively establishing the plot to the sixth episode "This Extraordinary Being". To further tie to the comic series, the writing staff only considered using the established characters that would best serve Angela's story so that she would remain the focus. To that end, they had established that characters like Doctor Manhattan, Laurie Blake, and Adrian Veidt were necessary to support Angela's discovery of her legacy. They had considered including Dan Dreiberg, the second Nite Owl, as well, but Lindelof wanted to have a fair balance of old and new characters within the show, and felt that adding Dan would have tipped the balance too far away from the new characters. They did consider Dan's fate as part of the "Peteypedia" additional materials created by the show's writers, in which Dan remains in prison after he and Laurie were arrested for vigilantism in the past, and refusing to accept the FBI's offer to work with them as Laurie had done.

Lindelof used his experience from his past shows to plot out the season prior to writing, stating "What I've learned over time is you need to know the answers to the mysteries...If you don't know those, you're lost. Every time you come to an intersection, you won't know whether to turn left or right." The writers had established some of the season's key mysteries in writing for the pilot, such as Hooded Justice being Will Reeves and Cal being Doctor Manhattan, but how these were to be revealed to the characters in the show and the audience came later in the writing process. Ten episodes were planned for the first season. After completing the sixth episode, "This Extraordinary Being", Lindelof felt the story was closer to its ending rather than as a midpoint, and that if they continued for four additional episodes, one of them would have been filler, and instead opted to conclude the story with three episodes. The omitted episode would have likely covered more of Lady Trieu's backstory, according to Lindelof, though it would not have been exclusively devoted to that topic. Instead, some of this material was covered in conversations within the seventh episode "An Almost Religious Awe".

A show-within-the-show, American Hero Story, was used to tell the purported backstory of Hooded Justice. Writer Cord Jefferson said American Hero Story was meant to be the opposite to what they were creating for the actual show, a "cheesy" production that perpetuated the in-universe myth of Hooded Justice being a white man. Lindelof said the show was designed to be comparable to Ryan Murphy's series American Horror Story and American Crime Story, and had even considered bringing in Murphy to play himself as the producer of American Hero Story. He opted against this, but still treated American Hero Story like a Murphy work, and taking its producer to be somewhat secretive and seclusive, like Murphy. Some media critics took the American Hero Story segments to be a parody of Zack Snyder's 2009 live-action adaptation of Watchmen, but Lindelof and Kassell asserted this was not their intent. Kassell said, "I fully admire [Snyder] as a filmmaker so to hear that it could even be used as a negative comment feels terrible. What I was wanting to do with those (American Hero Story scenes) is like, 'This is the version we could make,' and we are very concretely not making that version. We're grounding our story in a much more real kind of naturalism."

=== Casting ===
On May 23, 2018, it was announced that Regina King, Don Johnson, Tim Blake Nelson, Louis Gossett Jr., Adelaide Clemens, and Andrew Howard had joined the cast of the pilot. At least one of the actors was expected to have been cast in a potentially recurring role. In June 2018, it was reported that Jeremy Irons, Tom Mison, Frances Fisher, Jacob Ming-Trent, Yahya Abdul-Mateen II, and Sara Vickers had been cast in the pilot. On August 7, 2018, it was announced that Dylan Schombing, Adelynn Spoon, and Lily Rose Smith had joined the pilot's cast. In November 2018, it was reported that Jean Smart had been cast in a starring role and that James Wolk would appear in a recurring capacity. Additionally, it was confirmed that Irons would portray Adrian Veidt / Ozymandias, that Nelson would portray a newly devised character named Looking Glass, and that Vickers and Mison would join the cast. In January 2019, it was announced that Hong Chau and Dustin Ingram had been cast in recurring roles. Sigourney Weaver was offered the role of Laurie, but turned it down, Smart thanked Weaver for declining.

The performances of the cast during the pilot and other scenes influenced later episodes in the show's writing. When filming Irons for the pilot, Lindelof and his team found he took the character of Veidt in a comedic direction, something not suggested by the original comic series. They recognized that this was "a slightly absurd and ridiculous treatment of the character" that worked for Veidt's role within the show, and stuck with it in writing the later episodes.

While reports in July 2019 suggested that actor Robert Redford would play a fictionalized version of himself in the series, Lindelof affirmed later that the real Redford would not be appearing in the show; the use of Redford is a tribute to the closing pages of the original comic where it is suggested that Redford was positioning himself for president, in much the same way actor Ronald Reagan became president.

=== Music ===
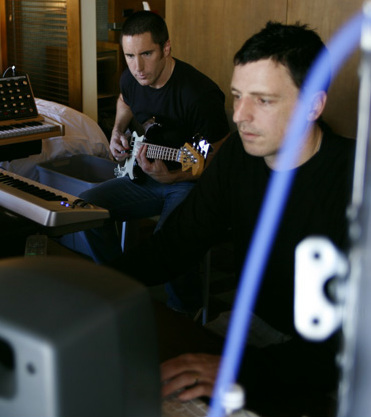
The music for the series is composed by Trent Reznor (left) and Atticus Ross.

Trent Reznor and Atticus Ross of Nine Inch Nails were announced as the series' composers on September 20, 2018. In considering the series music, Lindelof had considered using Reznor and Ross as they had not composed for television before. By coincidence, when Lindelof suggested the pair to HBO, HBO reported that the two had been in contact with the network about doing the music just a few days prior, as they were big fans of Watchmen. Reznor stated he and Ross were also fans of Lindelof's previous work and thus sought to offer their services for the show. Reznor and Ross had already prepared pieces for the pilot episode prior to filming, allowing Lindelof to better incorporate it into the pilot. According to Reznor, their initial compositions were set for "an aggressive, sort of sleazy tone" for the show, but adapted to the series as it changed tone throughout the first season.

Reznor and Ross released three albums of music from the show on both vinyl albums and through streaming services. The first volume was released on November 4, the second on November 25, and the third on December 16, 2019.

In addition to new compositions, the show employed licensed music selected by music supervisor Liza Richardson. Similar to how music and lyric references were employed in the original comic series, the soundtrack's song titles and lyrics frequently tied in with narrative elements of the show. For example, several songs from the musical Oklahoma! are used, given the show's setting in Tulsa. "A God Walks into Abar", in which the blue-skinned Doctor Manhattan is introduced, used a number of songs themed around the color blue, such as "Rhapsody in Blue" and "The Blue Danube". The final episode "See How They Fly" incorporates many of the unusual phrases from the Beatles' "I Am the Walrus" into its visual elements.

=== Filming ===
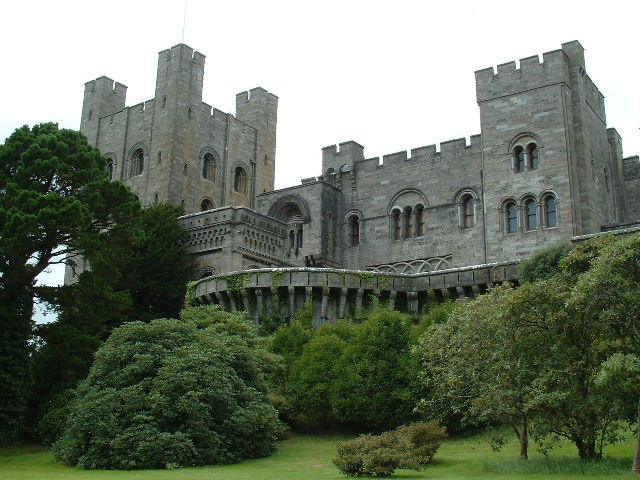
Penrhyn Castle in Wales was used for the scenes with Veidt.

Principal photography for the pilot commenced May 30, 2018, and lasted through June 19, 2019, in Cedartown, Georgia. Filming began on the 97th anniversary of the start of the riots during the second day of the production schedule on May 31. Throughout the month, filming occurred in additional Georgia cities and towns, including Macon, Fayetteville, Newnan, Palmetto, Brooks, Griffin, and Tucker. In October 2018, filming for the remainder of the first season began in Georgia. Filming locations that month included Palmetto, Brookhaven, Peachtree City, Decatur, and the MARTA station in Chamblee. In November 2018, shooting moved to locales such as Palmetto, Chamblee, McDonough, and the West Lake MARTA station. In December 2018, the production was working out of Union City, Newnan, and the Georgia World Congress Center. Interior shooting was filmed at Atlanta Metro Studios in Union City.

Filming of the country manor scenes was treated as a separate production, similar in nature to the Tales of the Black Freighter comic narrative within the original Watchmen graphic novel. Filming of these scenes took place in September 2018 in Wales at Penrhyn Castle. These were completed before most of the remaining episode scripts were finished, according to actor Tom Mison. According to Lindelof, these scenes are "the idea is doing an escape story with Adrian Veidt that's more like Wile E. Coyote and the Road Runner than it was like Escape from Alcatraz, that felt too delicious to not do". Until the third episode, HBO did not identify Irons' character as Veidt, but only as "Lord of a Country Manor". Lindelof chose to keep Veidt's identity a secret in part to avoid having the show be considered a sequel of the comic, as well as in keeping with the storytelling mystery used by the comic, in which the identity of Rorschach is not revealed until midway through the series.

=== Marketing ===
The first teaser for the series, named "Tick Tock", first aired on May 8, 2019.

With release of each episode, HBO released additional content on a special site named "Peteypedia", a collection of files written in-universe by Dale Petey and from other excerpts. Peteypedia was developed after most of the filming was completed, with writer Jeff Jensen overseeing it. The writing team were aware they had developed too much information that would fit into the broadcast show and debated how to present this, including as post-credit scenes or through social media. At the same time, HBO was working with Reznor and Ross on how to release the albums and were considering including additional liner notes in the vinyl releases, which included the additional background material the writers had developed. This led to creating reports and clippings similar to those presented in the original Watchmen comic, and presenting this as part of Peteypedia. Peteypedia allowed them, for example, to explain Laurie's trajectory from being the second Silk Spectre and fighting crime with Nite Owl at the end of the comic series, to becoming an FBI agent, elements of this that they had written briefly into the show but did not have broadcast time to spell out. They also tied elements back to the original comic. Of note is the fictional novel Fogdancing, written in-universe by Max Shea, one of the people who Veidt had employed to devise the alien squid attack in 1985. Jensen said that in the extra material with the graphic novel, Fogdancing had been made into a film at least twice, so the writers considered the work to be seminal to the characters in the television series, having the book appear at least twice during the show. Jensen created a whole plot summary of the work based on minimal clues from the comic, making the work to be about super-soldiers and having it tie to the idea of the Watchmen superhero culture.

=== Continuation ===
While HBO had not yet confirmed a second season following the show's broadcast, Lindelof stated that if there were, he would not likely be back for it, but instead have another producer step forward to tell another story set in this universe. Lindelof said he felt that the show was "not my story" and that "These nine episodes are sort of everything that I have to say at this point about Watchmen". Lindelof created the first season to be a complete story, in the same manner that each season of Fargo and True Detective were each self-contained stories. Following the broadcast of the season one finale, Lindelof still said that the story he told during the season was everything he could put forward about Watchmen, with a definitive beginning, middle, and end. However, he agreed with HBO that Watchmen should be treated as a continuing series, and did not rule out returning, but would want to have time to develop a similar complete story before committing.

By January 2020, Lindelof stated he had passed on a second season but gave his blessing to anyone that followed him as showrunner. HBO's programming chief Casey Bloys stated with regards to a second season that "[i]t would be hard to imagine doing it without Damon involved in some way", while not altogether dismissing the possibility of the concept of one. Due to this, HBO reclassified Watchmen as a limited series in February 2020, with the potential for additional installments. In October 2020, DC Comics began publishing the comic book limited series Rorschach, written by Tom King, drawn by Jorge Fornés, and explicitly set after the events of the HBO series, with the events of the final episode being mentioned in its first issue.

== Broadcast and distribution ==
The series was first broadcast on the HBO network from October 20 through December 15, 2019. In New Zealand, Watchmen is distributed exclusively by Neon, Sky Television's subscription television series. In Australia, the series is distributed by Foxtel's streaming service.

The series was released onto digital media for purchase or streaming in December 2019. Warner Bros. Home Entertainment released the series on Blu-ray under the title Watchmen: An HBO Limited Series on June 2, 2020.

Across May and June 2020, the George Floyd protests arose as black people and others protested against police violence, and some saw Watchmen as a "predictive text for the current moment". HBO made the series available for free streaming from its website and other on demand services on the weekend of June 19, 2020, in observation of Juneteenth, identifying the show "highlighting Black experiences, voices and storytellers" as "this timely, poignant series that explores the legacy of systemic racism in America".

== Reception ==
=== Critical response ===
Watchmen received critical acclaim. On review aggregator website Rotten Tomatoes, the series has a 96% rating based on 408 reviews, with an average rating of 8.6/10. The website's critical consensus reads, "Bold and bristling, Watchmen isn't always easy viewing, but by adding new layers of cultural context and a host of complex characters it expertly builds on its source material to create an impressive identity of its own." On Metacritic, it has a weighted average score of 85 out of 100, based on 35 critics, indicating "universal acclaim".

Rotten Tomatoes' audience score is lower than the critics' consensus, with several news outlets reporting that the site was review bombed. Esquire writer Matt Miller alleged that "far-right trolls" artificially deflated the audience score. These outlets agree that the chief complaint among followers of the source material is that the image of fan-favorite character Rorschach is adopted by the Seventh Kavalry, a white supremacist organization. Many fans agreed with the television series' use of Rorschach's image, citing Alan Moore's intention in the original Watchmen to comment on fascist undertones within the superhero genre. Other fans have claimed that the show fails to properly reflect the complexities of Rorschach's character. In response, Damon Lindelof stated that the show is not intended to portray Walter Kovacs, the original Rorschach, as a racist. At the New York Comic Con, he explained that Rorschach's journal had been misinterpreted by the New Frontiersman and that his image has been misappropriated by the Seventh Kavalry. "He's been dead for over 30 years," Lindelof clarified. "He doesn't get to say, 'You misunderstood me. No, I wasn't a white supremacist.' They decided what he was."

Patrick Wilson, who played Dan Dreiberg / Nite Owl in the 2009 film adaptation, praised the series, saying he was initially curious based on his familiarity with the source material but said he was hooked by the cast and wound up loving the series.

=== Ratings ===
Viewership and ratings per episode of Watchmen
No.	Title	Air date	Rating (18–49)	Viewers (millions)	DVR (18–49)	DVR viewers (millions)	Total (18–49)	Total viewers (millions)
1	"It's Summer and We're Running Out of Ice"	October 20, 2019	0.25	0.799	0.14	0.403	0.39	1.202
2	"Martial Feats of Comanche Horsemanship"	October 27, 2019	0.25	0.765	0.18	0.513	0.43	1.278
3	"She Was Killed by Space Junk"	November 3, 2019	0.19	0.648	0.22	0.563	0.41	1.211
4	"If You Don't Like My Story, Write Your Own"	November 10, 2019	0.22	0.707	0.20	0.524	0.42	1.231
5	"Little Fear of Lightning"	November 17, 2019	0.26	0.752	0.20	0.593	0.46	1.345
6	"This Extraordinary Being"	November 24, 2019	0.21	0.620	0.17	0.528	0.38	1.148
7	"An Almost Religious Awe"	December 1, 2019	0.25	0.779	0.17	0.509	0.42	1.288
8	"A God Walks into Abar"	December 8, 2019	0.28	0.822	0.19	0.527	0.47	1.349
9	"See How They Fly"	December 15, 2019	0.33	0.935	0.17	0.575	0.50	1.510

=== Audience viewership ===
According to HBO, the first episode of Watchmen had more than 1.5 million viewers on its first night across television and streaming services, the strongest debut performance for the network. The first broadcast of the episode, at 9 p.m. EDT, had 800,000 viewers, making it the most viewed debut episode for any premium-cable show in 2019. The second episode dropped to about 1.3 million viewers across the first night, with 765,000 watching the first broadcast, though this was considered a strong performance as the show aired alongside Game 5 of the 2019 World Series.

As of episode 9, HBO reported 7 million viewers to date, making it HBO's most viewed new series since Big Little Lies. HBO estimates that the Sunday night premiere viewership represents only about 10 percent of the total viewership for an episode, to the effect of word-of-mouth that has brought new viewers to the show, with the first episode having a total of 9.6 million viewers as of December 4, 2019.

=== Accolades ===
Among the various awards, Watchmen led total nominations of the main Primetime and Creative Arts Emmy Awards for the 2019–20 television season with a total of 26 nominations, and won a combined 11 awards, including Outstanding Limited Series, Outstanding Lead Actress in a Limited Series or Movie (for Regina King), Outstanding Supporting Actor in a Limited Series or Movie (for Yahya Abdul-Mateen II) and Outstanding Writing for a Limited Series, Movie or Dramatic Special (for Damon Lindelof and Cord Jefferson) for the episode "This Extraordinary Being".

Year	Award	Category	Nominee(s)	Result	Ref.
2019	American Film Institute Awards	Television Programs of the Year	Watchmen	Won	
2019	Clio Awards	Television/Streaming: Teaser	"Tick Tock"	Won	
2019	Costume Designers Guild Awards	Excellence in Sci-Fi/Fantasy Television	Sharen Davis (for "It's Summer and We're Running Out of Ice")	Nominated	
2019	Critics' Choice Television Awards	Best Actress in a Drama Series	Regina King	Won	
2019	Critics' Choice Television Awards	Best Drama Series	Watchmen	Nominated	
2019	Critics' Choice Television Awards	Best Supporting Actor in a Drama Series	Tim Blake Nelson	Nominated	
2019	Critics' Choice Television Awards	Best Supporting Actress in a Drama Series	Jean Smart	Won	
2019	Directors Guild of America Awards	Outstanding Directing – Drama Series	Nicole Kassell (for "It's Summer and We're Running Out of Ice")	Won	
2019	Directors Guild of America Awards	Outstanding Directing – Drama Series	Stephen Williams (for "This Extraordinary Being")	Nominated	
2019	Motion Picture Sound Editors Awards	Achievement in Sound Editing – Sound Effects and Foley for Episodic Long Form Broadcast Media	Brad North, Harry Cohen, Jordan Wilby, Zane D. Bruce, Lindsay Pepper, Antony Zeller and AJ Shapiro (for "This Extraordinary Being")	Nominated	
2019	NAACP Image Awards	Outstanding Actress in a Drama Series	Regina King	Nominated	
2019	NAACP Image Awards	Outstanding Drama Series	Watchmen	Nominated	
2019	NAACP Image Awards	Outstanding Writing in a Drama Series	Damon Lindelof and Cord Jefferson (for "This Extraordinary Being")	Nominated	
2019	Producers Guild of America Awards	Outstanding Producer of Episodic Television – Drama	Damon Lindelof, Tom Spezialy, Nicole Kassell, Stephen Williams, Joseph E. Iberti, Ron Schmidt, Lila Byock, Nick Cuse, Christal Henry, Karen Wacker, John Blair and Carly Wray	Nominated	
2019	Satellite Awards	Best Television Series – Genre	Watchmen	Nominated	
2019	Satellite Awards	Best Actress – Television Series Drama	Regina King	Nominated	
2019	Screen Actors Guild Awards	Outstanding Performance by a Stunt Ensemble in a Television Series	Watchmen	Nominated	
2019	Society of Composers & Lyricists Awards	Outstanding Original Score for a Television or Streaming Production	Trent Reznor & Atticus Ross	Nominated	
2019	Visual Effects Society Awards	Outstanding Compositing in an Episode	Nathaniel Larouche, Iyi Tubi, Perunika Yorgova and Mitchell Beaton (for "Pilot; Looking Glass")	Nominated	
2019	Writers Guild of America Awards	Drama Series	Lila Byock, Nick Cuse, Christal Henry, Branden Jacobs-Jenkins, Cord Jefferson, Jeff Jensen, Claire Kiechel, Damon Lindelof, Janine Nabers, Stacy Osei-Kuffour, Tom Spezialy and Carly Wray	Nominated	
2019	Writers Guild of America Awards	New Series	Lila Byock, Nick Cuse, Christal Henry, Branden Jacobs-Jenkins, Cord Jefferson, Jeff Jensen, Claire Kiechel, Damon Lindelof, Janine Nabers, Stacy Osei-Kuffour, Tom Spezialy and Carly Wray	Won	
2020	Black Reel Television Awards	Outstanding Actress, TV Movie/Limited Series	Regina King	Won	
2020	Black Reel Television Awards	Outstanding Director, TV Movie/Limited Series	Stephen Williams (for "She Was Killed by Space Junk")	Nominated	
2020	Black Reel Television Awards	Outstanding Director, TV Movie/Limited Series	Stephen Williams (for "This Extraordinary Being")	Won	
2020	Black Reel Television Awards	Outstanding Music (Comedy, Drama, TV Movie or Limited Series)	Liza Richardson (music supervisor)	Nominated	
2020	Black Reel Television Awards	Outstanding Supporting Actor, TV Movie/Limited Series	Yahya Abdul-Mateen II	Won	
2020	Black Reel Television Awards	Outstanding Supporting Actor, TV Movie/Limited Series	Jovan Adepo	Nominated	
2020	Black Reel Television Awards	Outstanding Supporting Actor, TV Movie/Limited Series	Louis Gossett Jr.	Nominated	
2020	Black Reel Television Awards	Outstanding Television Movie or Limited Series	Watchmen	Won	
2020	Black Reel Television Awards	Outstanding Writing, TV Movie/Limited Series	Damon Lindelof and Christal Henry (for "If You Don't Like My Story, Write Your Own")	Won	
2020	Black Reel Television Awards	Outstanding Writing, TV Movie/Limited Series	Damon Lindelof and Cord Jefferson (for "This Extraordinary Being")	Nominated	
2020	GLAAD Media Awards	Outstanding Individual Episode	"This Extraordinary Being"	Nominated	
2020	Harvey Awards	Best Adaptation from a Comic Book/Graphic Novel	Watchmen	Won	
2020	Hugo Awards	Best Dramatic Presentation, Short Form	"A God Walks into Abar"	Nominated	
2020	Hugo Awards	Best Dramatic Presentation, Short Form	"This Extraordinary Being"	Nominated	
2020	Nebula Awards	Outstanding Dramatic Presentation	"A God Walks into Abar"	Nominated	
2020	Peabody Awards	Entertainment	Watchmen	Won	
2020	Primetime Emmy Awards	Outstanding Directing for a Limited Series, Movie or Dramatic Special	Steph Green (for "Little Fear of Lightning")	Nominated	
2020	Primetime Emmy Awards	Outstanding Directing for a Limited Series, Movie or Dramatic Special	Nicole Kassell (for "It's Summer and We're Running Out of Ice")	Nominated	
2020	Primetime Emmy Awards	Outstanding Directing for a Limited Series, Movie or Dramatic Special	Stephen Williams (for "This Extraordinary Being")	Nominated	
2020	Primetime Emmy Awards	Outstanding Lead Actor in a Limited Series or Movie	Jeremy Irons	Nominated	
2020	Primetime Emmy Awards	Outstanding Lead Actress in a Limited Series or Movie	Regina King	Won	
2020	Primetime Emmy Awards	Outstanding Limited Series	Damon Lindelof, Tom Spezialy, Nicole Kassell, Stephen Williams, Joseph E. Iberti, Ron Schmidt, Carly Wray, Lila Byock, Nick Cuse, Christal Henry, Karen Wacker and John Blair	Won	
2020	Primetime Emmy Awards	Outstanding Supporting Actor in a Limited Series or Movie	Yahya Abdul-Mateen II (for "A God Walks Into Abar")	Won	
2020	Primetime Emmy Awards	Outstanding Supporting Actor in a Limited Series or Movie	Jovan Adepo (for "This Extraordinary Being")	Nominated	
2020	Primetime Emmy Awards	Outstanding Supporting Actor in a Limited Series or Movie	Louis Gossett Jr. (for "See How They Fly")	Nominated	
2020	Primetime Emmy Awards	Outstanding Supporting Actress in a Limited Series or Movie	Jean Smart (for "She Was Killed by Space Junk")	Nominated	
2020	Primetime Emmy Awards	Outstanding Writing for a Limited Series, Movie or Dramatic Special	Damon Lindelof and Cord Jefferson (for "This Extraordinary Being")	Won	
2020	Primetime Creative Arts Emmy Awards	Outstanding Casting for a Limited Series, Movie or Special	Victoria Thomas and Meagan Lewis	Won	
2020	Primetime Creative Arts Emmy Awards	Outstanding Cinematography for a Limited Series or Movie	Xavier Grobet (for "Little Fear of Lightning")	Nominated	
2020	Primetime Creative Arts Emmy Awards	Outstanding Cinematography for a Limited Series or Movie	Gregory Middleton (for "This Extraordinary Being")	Won	
2020	Primetime Creative Arts Emmy Awards	Outstanding Fantasy/Sci-Fi Costumes	Sharen Davis and Valerie Zielonka (for "It's Summer and We're Running Out of Ice")	Won	
2020	Primetime Creative Arts Emmy Awards	Outstanding Main Title Design	Paul Mitchell, Olga Midlenko, Maciek Sokalski, Gabe Perez and Benjamin Woodlock	Nominated	
2020	Primetime Creative Arts Emmy Awards	Outstanding Music Composition for a Limited Series, Movie or Special	Trent Reznor and Atticus Ross (for "It's Summer and We're Running Out of Ice")	Won	
2020	Primetime Creative Arts Emmy Awards	Outstanding Music Supervision	Liza Richardson (for "This Extraordinary Being")	Nominated	
2020	Primetime Creative Arts Emmy Awards	Outstanding Original Music and Lyrics	"The Way It Used to Be" – Trent Reznor and Atticus Ross (for "This Extraordinary Being")	Nominated	
2020	Primetime Creative Arts Emmy Awards	Outstanding Production Design for a Narrative Period or Fantasy Program (One Hour or More)	Kristian Milsted, Jay Pelissier and Edward McLoughlin (for "An Almost Religious Awe")	Nominated	
2020	Primetime Creative Arts Emmy Awards	Outstanding Single-Camera Picture Editing for a Limited Series or Movie	David Eisenberg (for "It's Summer and We're Running Out of Ice")	Nominated	
2020	Primetime Creative Arts Emmy Awards	Outstanding Single-Camera Picture Editing for a Limited Series or Movie	Anna Hauger (for "This Extraordinary Being")	Nominated	
2020	Primetime Creative Arts Emmy Awards	Outstanding Single-Camera Picture Editing for a Limited Series or Movie	Henk Van Eeghen (for "A God Walks Into Abar")	Won	
2020	Primetime Creative Arts Emmy Awards	Outstanding Sound Editing for a Limited Series, Movie or Special	Brad North, Harry Cohen, Jordan Wilby, Tiffany S. Griffith, Antony Zeller, A.J. Shapiro, Sally Boldt, Zane Bruce and Lindsay Pepper (for "This Extraordinary Being")	Won	
2020	Primetime Creative Arts Emmy Awards	Outstanding Sound Mixing for a Limited Series or Movie	Douglas Axtell, Joe DeAngelis and Chris Carpenter (for "This Extraordinary Being")	Won	
2020	Primetime Creative Arts Emmy Awards	Outstanding Special Visual Effects	Erik Henry, Matt Robken, Ashley J. Ward, David Fletcher, Mathieu Raynault, Bobo Skipper, Ahmed Gharraph, Emanuel Fuchs and Francois Lambert (for "See How They Fly")	Nominated	
2020	TCA Awards	Individual Achievement in Drama	Regina King	Won	
2020	TCA Awards	Outstanding Achievement in Movies, Miniseries and Specials	Watchmen	Won	
2020	TCA Awards	Outstanding New Program	Watchmen	Won	
2020	TCA Awards	Program of the Year	Watchmen	Won	
2021	American Cinema Editors Awards	Best Edited Limited Series or Motion Picture for Television	Anna Hauger (for "This Extraordinary Being")	Nominated	
2021	American Society of Cinematographers Awards	Outstanding Achievement in Cinematography in Motion Picture, Miniseries or Pilot Made for Television	Gregory Middleton (for "This Extraordinary Being")	Nominated	
2021	Cinema Audio Society Awards	Outstanding Achievement in Sound Mixing for Television Movie or Limited Series	Doug Axtell, Joseph DeAngelis, Chris Carpenter, Atticus Ross, Judah Getz and Antony Zeller (for "This Extraordinary Being")	Nominated	
2021	Gotham Independent Film Awards	Breakthrough Series – Long Form	Damon Lindelof, Tom Spezialy, Nicole Kassell, Stephen Williams and Joseph E. Iberti	Won	
2021	Saturn Awards	Best Superhero Adaptation Television Series	Watchmen	Nominated	
2021	Saturn Awards	Best Actress on Television	Regina King	Nominated	

=== Legacy ===
Watchmen had been critically praised for presenting the events of the Tulsa race massacre of 1921. Until the show premiered, while historians had documented the event, few filmmakers were able to successfully acquire funding for projects that addressed the event due to its relative obscurity in American history. Watchmen served as a "catalyst" for more interest in works related to the massacre ahead of the event's 100th anniversary in 2021, according to The Washington Post's DeNeen Brown. At least four separate documentaries were produced in advance of the anniversary, and there was an increase in depictions of the event in other works, such as in HBO's Lovecraft Country. In September 2026, Watchmen was ranked 39th on The New York Times's list of the 100 Best TV Shows of the 21st Century, based on ballots from more than 500 actors, writers, producers, and other television professionals.

== See also ==
- List of Primetime Emmy Awards received by HBO
