= A God Walks into Abar =

- Watchmen episode
- Episode no.: Episode 8
- Directed by: Nicole Kassell
- Written by: Jeff Jensen; Damon Lindelof
- Cinematography by: Gregory Middleton
- Editing by: Henk Van Eeghen
- Production code: 108
- Original air date: December 8, 2019
- Running time: 63 minutes

Guest appearances
- Anatole Taubman as Hans Osterman; Lily Rose Smith as Rosie; Adelynn Spoon as Emma

Episode chronology
← Previous "An Almost Religious Awe"	Next → "See How They Fly"

"A God Walks into Abar" (solicited as "A God Walks into A Bar") is the eighth episode of the HBO superhero drama miniseries Watchmen, based on the 1986 DC Comics series of the same name by Alan Moore and Dave Gibbons. It was written by Jeff Jensen and Damon Lindelof and directed by Nicole Kassell, and aired on December 8, 2019. The episode centers on the character of Doctor Manhattan and events of his life after the comic.

== Synopsis ==
In 2009, on the anniversary of VVN (Victory in Vietnam) Day, Angela Abar, then a police officer in Saigon, is met by Doctor Manhattan in a bar. Manhattan introduces himself and asks Angela to dinner the next night. Angela initially doesn't believe Manhattan, as numerous people are dressed as him for the holiday. After explaining how he experiences time simultaneously, Manhattan says that after leaving Earth in 1985, he had been on Europa, creating life in a closed ecosystem. He had created clones of Phillips and Crookshanks, the lord and lady of a British manor who had housed him and his father after they escaped Nazi Germany in the 1930s. Manhattan explains that, after he surreptitiously witnessed the two having sex, Phillip and Crookshanks encouraged him to create something beautiful. After creating life on Europa, he teleported the manor there for the clones, but eventually left because of the clones' obsession with pleasing and worshipping him.

Angela continues to doubt Manhattan's identity and his reasons for his interest in her. Manhattan explains events of the future to her, knowing she will help him during a period in time that he cannot foresee. In two weeks' time, Angela helps Manhattan select a body from a morgue to take on its human appearance to avoid detection. He adopts the persona of Calvin Jelani, who had recently died of a presumed heart attack. In six months, Angela becomes frustrated with Manhattan's lack of empathy. Manhattan visits Adrian Veidt, who has isolated himself at Karnak, his Antarctica base. Seeing that Manhattan has fallen in love, Veidt offers him a small device he had created in 1985, originally intended as a weapon to use against Manhattan. The device uses tachyons to inhibit Manhattan's memory, rendering him unable to use his powers except in life-or-death circumstances. In exchange, Manhattan offers to teleport Veidt to his Europa ecosystem, where the Phillips and Crookshanks clones will serve and adore him as he so desires.

Before allowing Angela to use the device on him, Manhattan visits Will in New York City, explaining he will need to help his granddaughter Angela in 2019.

In 2019, after Angela removes Veidt's device, Manhattan tells her that he is aware of the Seventh Kavalry's plan to capture him, and teleports their children to safety with Will in downtown Tulsa. Angela realizes Manhattan is speaking simultaneously to her in 2019 and to Will in 2009, and demands Manhattan ask Will how he knew of Judd's connection to Cyclops. Will, in 2009, tells Manhattan that he does not know Judd, and Angela realizes that she gave Will the idea to kill Judd that started the events of the series. Manhattan states the Kavalry are about to attack. Angela, despite knowing that Manhattan is aware of the future, prepares to defend him; Manhattan tells her this was the moment he fell in love with her. The two kill most of the Kavalry, but the last one fires a tachyon cannon to capture him, to Angela's anguish.

In Vietnam 2009, Angela accepts Manhattan's story and invitation to dinner.

In a post-credits scene, Veidt is punished by the Phillips and Crookshanks clones for wanting to leave. In his cell, the Game Warden brings him an anniversary cake. It is revealed that the Game Warden was the first Phillips clone created by Manhattan. After the Warden leaves, Veidt discovers a horseshoe baked into the cake, and begins to use it to escape.

== Production ==
The episode was directed by Nicole Kassell, who also directed the series' first two episodes. Kassell stated that Yahya Abdul-Mateen II played Doctor Manhattan throughout the episode, including within the bar scenes. As Dr. Manhattan, Abdul-Mateen spoke outside of his normal voice range. The choice to not reveal his face during these scenes was part of Damon Lindelof and Jeff Jensen's script. They also feared that showing Manhattan's face at this point would cause fans of the limited series to be disappointed and upset, regardless of what approach they used for matching the comic. As shooting a conversation where only one person's face would be visible, Kassell worked with cinematographer Greg Middleton to establish what blocking shots they would use to avoid excessive repetition through these scenes, as well as how they would transition in and out of these scenes.

Abdul-Mateen had accepted the role of Cal before knowing he would also be Doctor Manhattan; he was only told this between filming of the second and third episodes. Because he knew this would likely involve him being naked, he hired a personal trainer and started a diet to be able to present a good body image for the camera. Makeup to cover Abdul-Mateen took about two and a half hours of airbushing, while removing the makeup took another hour of washing with solvents.

The Vietnamese bar was modeled after Eddie's bar in Vietnam in the comic. The episode included scenes from within Karnak, Veidt's Antarctica base, and Kassell directed some shots to be nearly identical to those from the comic. In the flashback to young Jon Osterman's time at the manor, an illustrated Bible is shown to him. The illustrations were drawn by Dave Gibbons, the illustrator of the original limited series, who served as a consultant on the TV series.

The episode featured the series' only post-credits scene with Veidt after being put on trial. Kassell said that they opted to use a post-credits scene to avoid disrupting the calculated flow of the rest of the episode, comparing the scene to the comic's additional material after each chapter.

The title of the episode was a happenstance, according to Kassell. They had given Angela the surname "Abar" early in development. Later, as they were storyboarding episodes, Kassell had seen one of the writers had put down "...walks into a bar..." as a concept for this episode, and on seeing that, realized the serendipitous nature of the Abar name.

== Reception ==
=== Critical response ===
"A God Walks into Abar" received universal critical acclaim. On Rotten Tomatoes, the episode has an approval rating of 100% with an average score of 9.25 out of 10, based on 23 reviews. The site's critical consensus reads, "Watchmen seamlessly begins to tie up loose ends, but Regina King and Yahya Abdul-Mateen II's exceptional performances make 'A God Walks Into Abar' a surprisingly beautiful and profoundly tragic love story."

=== Accolades ===
For the 72nd Primetime Emmy Awards, Yahya Abdul-Mateen II won the award for Outstanding Supporting Actor in a Limited Series or Movie, and editor Henk Van Eeghen won the award for Outstanding Single-Camera Picture Editing for a Limited Series or Movie for this episode.

"A God Walks into Abar" was one of six television episodes nominated in 2020 for a Hugo Award for Best Dramatic Presentation, Short Form, alongside "This Extraordinary Being," the sixth episode of the series.

=== Ratings ===
An estimated 822,000 viewers watched "A God Walks into Abar" on its first broadcast night.
