= Little Fear of Lightning =

- Watchmen episode
- Episode no.: Episode 5
- Directed by: Steph Green
- Written by: Damon Lindelof; Carly Wray
- Cinematography by: Xavier Pérez Grobet
- Editing by: Henk Van Eeghen
- Production code: 105
- Original air date: November 17, 2019
- Running time: 59 minutes

Guest appearances
- James Wolk as Joseph Keene Jr.; Paula Malcomson as Renee; Steve Coulter as Simmons; Cheyenne Jackson as Hooded Justice; Philip Labes as Young Wade Tillman

Episode chronology
← Previous "If You Don't Like My Story, Write Your Own"	Next → "This Extraordinary Being"

"Little Fear of Lightning" is the fifth episode of the HBO superhero drama miniseries Watchmen, based on the 1986 DC Comics series of the same name by Alan Moore and Dave Gibbons. The episode was written by Damon Lindelof and Carly Wray and directed by Steph Green, and aired on November 17, 2019. It primarily focuses on the character of Wade Tillman, the masked police detective who goes by the name Looking Glass.

== Synopsis ==
On November 2, 1985, a teenage Wade Tillman visits Hoboken, New Jersey with a group of Jehovah's Witnesses. A girl from a local street gang leads Wade into a hall of funhouse mirrors and pretends to seduce him to steal his clothes and belongings. Moments later, Adrian Veidt's genetically-engineered squid is teleported into New York City. The psychic blast kills almost everyone in its vicinity, but Wade survives, seemingly because he was surrounded by mirrors. However, he remains traumatized from the incident for life.

In 2019, Wade maintains a cover identity as a market research consultant, and runs regular group therapy sessions for others suffering PTSD from the squid attack. Laurie instructs the Tulsa police to search for the church in the Seventh Kavalry videos. She informs Wade that she bugged his desk and overheard him talking to Angela about a bottle of pills, and asks to know what Wade told her, but Wade declines. The next day, Wade visits his ex-wife Cynthia, a biomedical researcher to whom he gave the pills for inspection. Cynthia reveals that the pills contained Nostalgia, an illegal drug partially derived from human brains allowing consumers to experience the memories of the harvestee.

At one of his support group sessions, Wade meets a new visitor named Renee, who takes him to a bar where the two drink and flirt. As Renee leaves, Wade realizes the truck picking her up belongs to the Seventh Kavalry. He follows the truck to an abandoned building, where he finds the set of the church in the videos and the Kavalry testing a teleportation device. Wade is captured, and one Kavalry member reveals himself as Senator Joseph Keene Jr. Keene explains that both he and Judd Crawford assumed leadership of the Tulsa branch of the Kavalry to maintain peace after the White Night, and coerces Wade to learn from Angela what she knows of Judd's murderer. In exchange, Joe shows Wade a video made by Adrian Veidt on November 1, 1985 that explains his staging of the squid attack to future President Robert Redford.

The next day, a shaken Wade brings Angela to his desk to return the pills and asks her what she knows about Judd's death. She tells him that Will, her grandfather, was responsible, unaware of Laurie's audio bug. Laurie comes out to arrest Angela, but Angela ingests the entire bottle of Nostalgia pills before she is escorted to a cell. Wade returns home, unaware that an armed group of Kavalry members have followed him.

Meanwhile, Adrian Veidt dons a survival suit tied to a lifeline, and is launched via catapult out of his prison. He emerges on Jupiter's Europa, surrounded by corpses of numerous Phillips and Crookshanks clones. He uses their bodies to write out a message (of which only "SAVE ME D" is revealed) to a nearby satellite. The Game Warden yanks Veidt back by his lifeline, and informs him that he is under arrest.

== Production ==
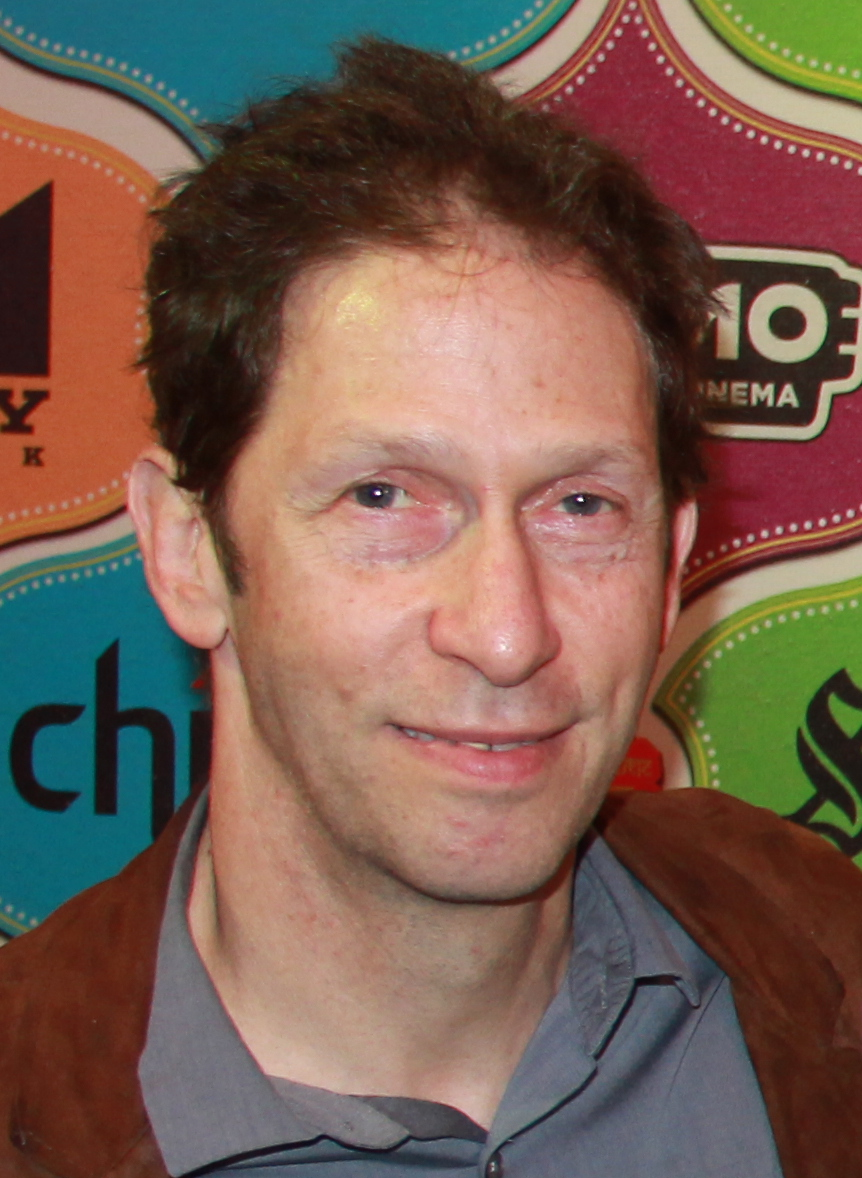
This episode prominently focuses on Tim Blake Nelson's character, revealing the origins of Looking Glass.

The episode opens with the climactic scene from the graphic novel depicting the 1985 appearance of the giant squid in New York City, which killed millions with the psychic blast emanating from its arrival. Series showrunner Damon Lindelof wanted the television series to bring to life some of the comic book's imagery, including the aftermath of the squid attack, before production started. The sequence ends on a pull-back shot from Hoboken to downtown New York City, which used a mix of practical and special effects. The scenes set in Hoboken were filmed in Atlanta, while the destruction in New York City was depicted via computer generated imagery. The size of the squid was not clear from the comic as it only appears in a few panels, but Lindelof wanted the creature to be as tall as a five-story building. The effects team incorporated much of the imagery from the limited series into the sequence, such as tentacles from the squid appearing embedded in buildings, while striving to maintain a realistic look for the scene.

With the squid sequence planned, Lindelof inferred that the attack would have long-lasting mental and emotional trauma on its survivors such as post-traumatic stress disorder, which would have been a necessary element of Veidt's plan to prevent the nations from regressing back to a nuclear war long after the event. The character of Wade Tillman/Looking Glass emerged from Lindelof's idea to represent the trauma of the attack in the series. The episode reveals that Wade's Looking Glass mask as well the lining of his baseball cap are made from mirrored fabric known in the series as "Reflectatine," which is said to protect from future squid attacks; Wade has also constructed a well-maintained "squid shelter" outside his home, and has installed two specialized alarms for potential future attacks. Lindelof likened Looking Glass' reflective mask to someone literally wrapping themselves in a tin foil hat. Lindelof used fear as a driving force of Looking Glass's character, both from his reaction to the attack as well as his being caught in a compromising sexual situation just before. Lindelof stated that the scene was based on his own teenage fears and insecurities regarding sex.

Of the Veidt storyline, Lindelof stated that the writers intended to place Veidt, who is repeatedly described in the novel as the "smartest man in the world," in a seemingly inescapable exile. Consequently, they selected Europa as the setting for Veidt's prison.

The episode's title is taken from a passage in Jules Verne's Twenty Thousand Leagues Under the Seas: "If there were no thunder, men would have little fear of lightning."

The episode features an uncredited cameo from Michael Imperioli, playing himself in an advertisement for New York City tourism following the squid attack.

== Reception ==
=== Ratings ===
Upon airing, the episode received 752,000 viewers, which was an increase from the previous week.

=== Critical response ===
"Little Fear of Lightning" received critical acclaim, with several reviewers considering it the series' best episode to date. On Rotten Tomatoes, the episode has an approval rating of 100% with an average score of 8.89 out of 10, based on 28 reviews. The site's critical consensus reads, "Along with the Lovecraftian inspired Giant Squid attack, Looking Glass's heartbreaking story adds much-needed momentum in 'Little Fear of Lightning'."

Siddhant Adlakha of IGN called the episode "a near-perfect hour of television," praising its prominent connections to the source material, the focus on Wade's character, and its advancement of the series' narrative. Rolling Stone's Alan Sepinwall praised Lindelof's vision for the episode, drawing similarities to his previous series, The Leftovers, and remarking that the episode "fills in a huge chunk of the mythology, while also doing that thing that both Alan Moore and Damon Lindelof do so well: looking at an utterly outrageous sci-fi/fantasy construct and wondering how a very real and fragile human being might respond to it."

=== Accolades ===
For the 72nd Primetime Emmy Awards, Steph Green was nominated for Outstanding Directing for a Limited Series, Movie, or Dramatic Special.
