= An Almost Religious Awe =

- Watchmen episode
- Episode no.: Episode 7
- Directed by: David Semel
- Written by: Stacy Osei-Kuffour; Claire Kiechel
- Cinematography by: Xavier Grobet
- Editing by: David Eisenberg
- Production code: 107
- Original air date: December 1, 2019
- Running time: 60 minutes

Guest appearances
- Don Johnson as Judd Crawford; Frances Fisher as Jane Crawford; James Wolk as Joseph Keene Jr.; Jolie Hoang-Rappaport as Bian; Dustin Ingram as Agent Petey; Jessica Camacho as Pirate Jenny; Valeri Ross as Old Woman June; Faithe Herman as Young Angela; Jennifer Vo Le as Officer Jen; Jovan Adepo as Will Reeves; Danielle Deadwyler as June

Episode chronology
← Previous "This Extraordinary Being"	Next → "A God Walks into Abar"

"An Almost Religious Awe" is the seventh episode of the HBO superhero drama miniseries Watchmen, based on the 1986 DC Comics series of the same name by Alan Moore and Dave Gibbons. The episode was written by Stacy Osei-Kuffour and Claire Kiechel, directed by David Semel, and aired on December 1, 2019. The episode charts the aftermath of Angela's prolonged Nostalgia trip through her grandfather's memories, while also providing glimpses into her childhood in Vietnam.

== Synopsis ==
Lady Trieu continues to treat Angela by removing the Nostalgia from her body by flushing her with cerebrospinal fluid through tubes connected to a host, which Angela believes is Will. Angela starts experiencing her childhood memories in Vietnam interspersed with Will's. When awake, Angela finds herself connected to a long tube that enters a locked room that she believes Will is in. After Bian gives a strange psychological test to Angela, Trieu explains that Bian is a clone of her dead mother, and she has been injecting Bian with her memories when she sleeps.

With Trieu preparing to activate the Millennium Clock within hours, Angela breaks into the locked room, only to find her tube connected to an unconscious elephant. She rips out her tube and takes an elevator to a lower floor to find a globe device that plays back the messages that people had left at the Manhattan booths. Trieu enters, explaining that her company is collecting the messages, and confirms that Doctor Manhattan is not on Mars, but actually in Tulsa disguised as a human. Trieu is aware of a Kavalry plot to capture and destroy Manhattan so that they can become like him, and claims that her activation of the Clock within the hour will save humanity.

Angela storms out and escapes the facility. Cal finds her at home rummaging for a hammer. Angela tells him that she has always loved him as a husband, but now, calling him "Jon," that they are in trouble, she proceeds to bash his head in. She extracts a small disk from his head, and watches as a blue glow emanates from Cal's body.

Petey reports to Laurie that he cannot find Wade, but discovered several Kavalry bodies in his shelter. Laurie learns from Angela's Nostalgia-induced ramblings about Judd's connection to the Kavalry and goes to visit Jane. Laurie realizes too late that Jane is working with the Kavalry, and is captured. Laurie is taken to the Kavalry headquarters, where Joe shows her a cage-like device the Kavalry plan to use to bring Manhattan to them, in hopes of becoming godlike themselves.

In the manor, Adrian Veidt has been on trial for 365 days by the Game Warden for his crimes, not only due to the squid attack but for killing numerous Phillips and Crookshanks clones. Veidt is given a chance to present his case, but he simply passes flatus in response. The Game Warden determines Veidt's verdict is to be judged by a pack of feral pigs, his "peers," who declare him guilty.

== Production ==
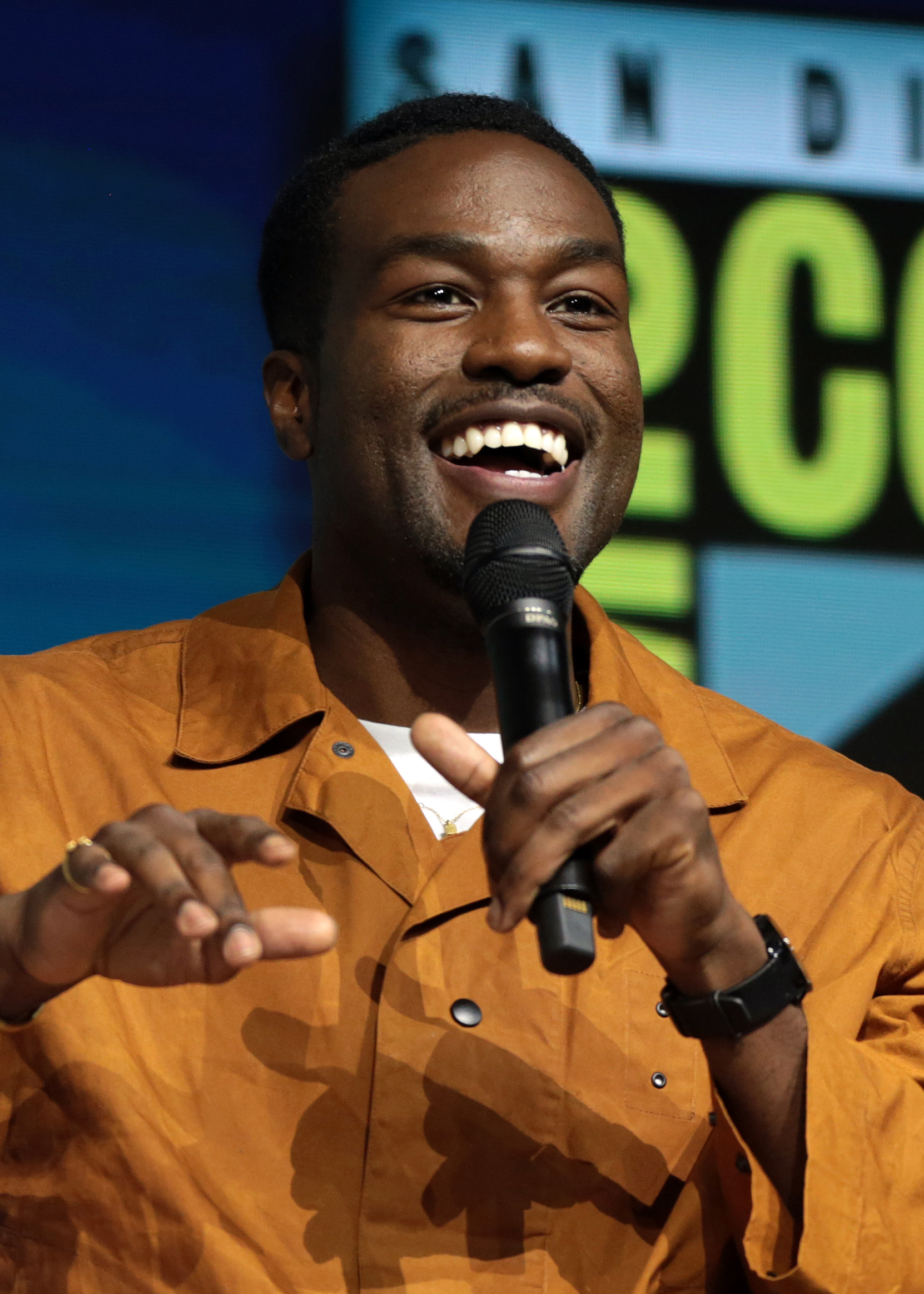
Yahya Abdul-Mateen II was not only cast to play Cal, but was considered for how he would play Doctor Manhattan as well.

"An Almost Religious Awe" reveals that Angela's husband Cal (played by Yahya Abdul-Mateen II) was the human identity that Doctor Manhattan had taken and that Angela was aware of this all along. According to showrunner Damon Lindelof, the writers had developed the miniseries with Angela as the central character, and only reused characters from the limited series comic when they would help advance Angela's story. When they considered how they could bring Doctor Manhattan back, they quickly settled that he could serve as a facet of love in Angela's life, creating the character of Cal. When casting for Cal, the showrunners were looking for qualities needed for both Cal and Manhattan, though did not tell those auditioning about the latter. Lindelof had been impressed with Abdul-Mateen's performance in The Handmaid's Tale and felt he could play the role of Cal who knew something was "off" about his identity. Additionally, the crew observed adequate chemistry in screen tests between Abdul-Mateen and Regina King, who plays Angela. Abdul-Mateen himself said that the role of Cal only hinted towards a "promising future," and had accepted the part of Cal as an opportunity to work with Lindelof. Lindelof subsequently told Abdul-Mateen of his dual role sometime between the filming of the second and third episodes. King herself was not told until after she had read scripts for the third and fourth episode of the series and questioned how Cal's behavior was scripted to Lindelof.

Television critics found several clues layered in previous episodes that pointed to this revelation, including Cal's dialogue mimicking what Manhattan might say and Laurie's feelings about Cal. Lindelof pointed to the Easter egg that Laurie's vibrator shown in "She Was Killed by Space Junk" was named "Excalibur" by its creator Daniel Dreiberg, as revealed on the supplementary material website "Peteypedia." The name is a play on the phrase "Ex-Cal Abar," which describes Laurie's relationship to Manhattan at this point in time.

The end credits of the episode feature a cover of David Bowie's "Life on Mars?", written for the series by Watchmen composers Trent Reznor and Atticus Ross. Reznor, who was personal friends with Bowie prior to the latter's death in 2016, remarked that composing the cover was a daunting task, but that he and Ross were ultimately "very proud" of the result.

The episode's title is taken from Manhattan's recollections in the original comic book series, describing the reaction of the Vietnamese soldiers that surrendered to him when America won the Vietnam War in the Watchmen alternate history.

== Reception ==
=== Critical response ===
On Rotten Tomatoes, "An Almost Religious Awe" has an approval rating of 92%, with an average rating of 8.05/10 from 26 reviewers. The site's summary of the critical consensus is "Though perhaps not as powerful as the previous installment, 'An Almost Religious Awe' proves that Damon Lindelof is not afraid to challenge viewer's expectations as Watchmen continues to twist and turn its way to the finale."

=== Ratings ===
"An Almost Religious Awe" was watched by 779,000 viewers on its first broadcast night.
