= If You Don't Like My Story, Write Your Own =

- Watchmen episode
- Episode no.: Episode 4
- Directed by: Andrij Parekh
- Written by: Damon Lindelof; Christal Henry
- Cinematography by: Gregory Middleton
- Editing by: David Eisenberg
- Production code: 104
- Original air date: November 10, 2019
- Running time: 52 minutes

Guest appearances
- James Wolk as Joe Keene; Lily Rose Smith as Rosie; Adelynn Spoon as Emma; Jolie Hoang-Rappaport as Bian; Dustin Ingram as Agent Petey; Jessica Camacho as Pirate Jenny

Episode chronology
← Previous "She Was Killed by Space Junk"	Next → "Little Fear of Lightning"

"If You Don't Like My Story, Write Your Own" is the fourth episode of the HBO superhero drama miniseries Watchmen, based on the 1986 DC Comics series of the same name by Alan Moore and Dave Gibbons. The episode was written by Damon Lindelof and Christal Henry and directed by Andrij Parekh, and aired on November 10, 2019. The episode introduces the character of Lady Trieu, played by Hong Chau, a wealthy industrialist that had bought out Adrian Veidt's enterprises on his death.

== Synopsis ==
The childless Clark couple is visited late at night by trillionaire Lady Trieu, who wishes to buy their house and farmland and offers them a baby created from their DNA as well as five million dollars in return. The Clarks agree, moments before an object from space lands nearby. Trieu claims it as her own.

Angela gets a call from the heritage center notifying that more information about Will has been discovered. She discreetly breaks into the closed facility, where she learns that Will is a survivor of the Tulsa massacre, but disappeared shortly thereafter. She hears a crash outside, and finds Laurie next to Angela's smashed car. Angela identifies the car as her own, and secretly pockets an unlabeled pill bottle belonging to Will that she finds inside. Later, Angela gives the pill bottle and the Ku Klux Klan outfit from Judd's closet to Wade for safekeeping, and asks Wade to have his ex-wife analyze the pills. While on patrol, Angela is outrun by an unknown vigilante, dubbed "Lube Man", after he witnesses her disposing of Will's wheelchair.

At the station, Laurie informs Angela they found unknown fingerprints on her car, and have a lead on new drone technology developed by Lady Trieu's company that may have been used to take her car. The two meet with Trieu at her Millennium Clock facility. Knowing that Angela was also born in Vietnam, Trieu asks to converse with her in Vietnamese and tells her that Will wants to know if she found the pills yet. Laurie takes note of a golden statue of Adrian Veidt at Trieu's headquarters. That night, Trieu's daughter Bian reports having had dreams of an attack on a Vietnamese village, despite never having been there. Trieu sends Bian back to her room and speaks to Will, who has listened from a nearby room. Trieu questions why Will does not directly tell Angela what is going on, but Will believes it is better for her to figure it out herself, with events coming to a head in three days.

Elsewhere, Veidt harvests human fetuses from a lake and uses a device to accelerate their aging to a new pair of Phillips and Crookshanks clones. As he brings them to his manor, he explains that they will soon gain full intelligence. He has them clear a room full of the murdered corpses of other clones, which he uses to launch by catapult to test the limits of his prison.

== Production ==
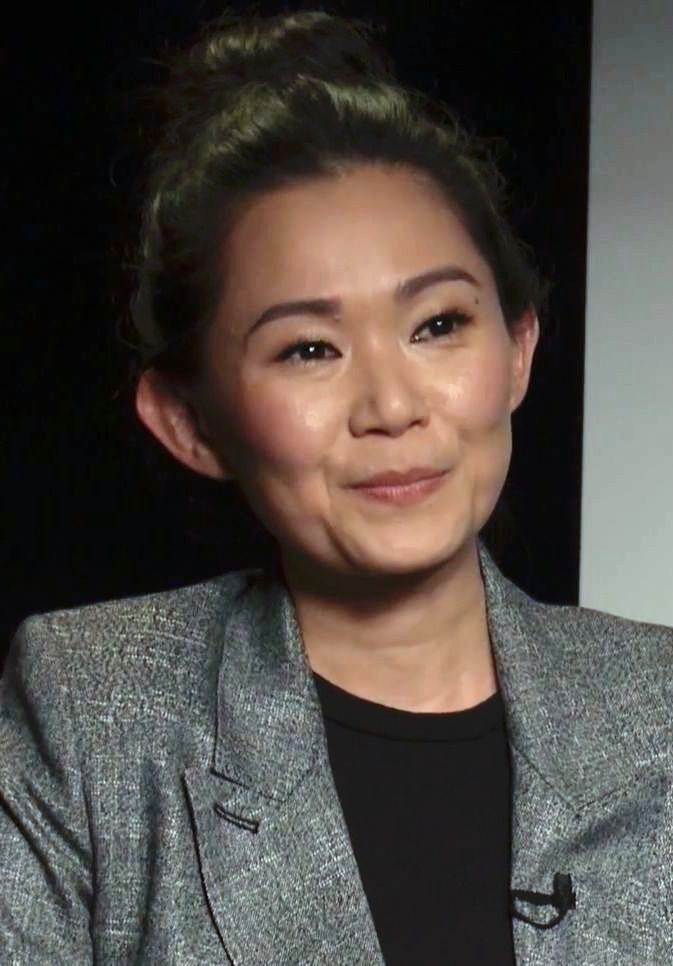
Lady Trieu is played by Hong Chau, whose Vietnamese heritage helped in her casting.

"If You Don't Like My Story, Write Your Own" introduces Lady Trieu, played by Hong Chau, an American actress of Vietnamese descent. Chau had not been familiar with the source material but had accepted Lindelof's invitation to hear about the part he proposed for her in the show. According to Chau, Lindelof spent about an hour and a half establishing the story of the comic series before going into the character of Trieu, how she was tied to the limited series, and his plans for her character within the show, all which intrigued Chau. He also expressed the importance of her Vietnamese heritage to Chau's story as well as ties to the original limited series. To prepare for the part, Chau reviewed the behaviors of real-life billionaires like Elon Musk, Mark Zuckerberg and Richard Branson, as well as Japanese scientists that were on the leading edge of cloning and genetics research. The episode's title is taken from a passage in Chinua Achebe's Things Fall Apart, the book Cal was reading when Angela tries to pick a fight.

The episode includes the only appearance of "Lube Man" within the series, in the scene where Angela attempts to chase him down after he witnesses her disposing of Will's wheelchair. Lube Man escapes by covering himself with some oil and then sliding feet-first into a drain opening. This was a wholly practical effect. While the drain was specifically constructed to help with the scene, Regina King, who played Angela, was amazed with the stuntman's ability. The mystery behind Lube Man became popular with fans of the show after the episode. Lindelof had written the scene to be "in the midst of other insane things happening" during the episode and did not expect the character or his identity to take off in popularity with fans of the show. While Lube Man did not appear again, the accompanying "Peteypedia" material for the show, purportedly collected by FBI Agent Dale Petey, heavily implies that Petey himself is Lube Man. Lindelof remained coy about confirming this, but directed readers to Peteypedia "to reach the obvious conclusion" to his identity. During a webcam interview by Rolling Stone of Trent Reznor, Atticus Ross and Damon Lindelof about the creation of the score, Lube Man hijacks the feed to demand Reznor and Ross play an underscore while he reads a poem/rap in exchange for unmasking himself. He does so, revealing himself to be Dustin Ingram. After Ingram/Lube Man departs Lindelof wonders aloud whether the insinuation that Petey was Lube Man would be considered canon and asked viewers to reach their own conclusion.

== Reception ==
=== Critical ===
At Rotten Tomatoes, the episode has a 93% approval rating with an average rating of 8.3 out of 10 based on 27 reviews. The site's summary of the critics states, "Guided by the bombastic introduction of the eccentric trillionaire Lady Trieu, 'If You Don't Like My Story, Write Your Own' makes for a truly bizarre, highly captivating experience."

=== Ratings ===
In its original broadcast in the United States on HBO, the episode had an estimated 707,000 viewers.
