= See How They Fly =

- Watchmen episode
- Episode no.: Episode 9
- Directed by: Frederick E.O. Toye
- Written by: Nick Cuse; Damon Lindelof
- Cinematography by: Alex Disenhof
- Editing by: David Eisenberg
- Production code: 109
- Original air date: December 15, 2019
- Running time: 67 minutes

Guest appearances
- Frances Fisher as Jane Crawford; James Wolk as Joe Keene; Robert Ray Wisdom as Seymour; Jolie Hoang-Rappaport as Bian; Elyse Dinh as Cleaning Woman; Jessica Camacho as Pirate Jenny; Lily Rose Smith as Rosie; Adelynn Spoon as Emma; Jovan Adepo as Will Reeves

Episode chronology
← Previous "A God Walks into Abar"	Next → Rorschach

"See How They Fly" is the ninth episode and series finale of the HBO superhero drama miniseries Watchmen, based on the 1986 DC Comics series of the same name by Alan Moore and Dave Gibbons. It was written by Nick Cuse and Damon Lindelof and directed by Frederick E.O. Toye, and aired on December 15, 2019. The finale sees the two competing plots within Tulsa to kidnap Doctor Manhattan come to a head, while Adrian Veidt prepares to finally escape his exile.

== Synopsis ==
Trieu, shown to be the daughter of Adrian Veidt from artificial insemination, visits Veidt in Karnak in 2008. She reveals her relation to Veidt as well as her knowledge that he engineered the 1985 squid attack (and subsequent squid rains), but warns that it did not produce his desired outcome of lasting world peace. Trieu requests Veidt's financial assistance to build a quantum centrifuge capable of extracting Doctor Manhattan's powers, in hopes of finding a more permanent solution for saving humanity. Trieu reveals she knows Manhattan is on Europa and has launched a probe to arrive there in 2013 to visually confirm his whereabouts. Veidt refuses to help or acknowledge her as his daughter.

On Europa, Veidt uses the horseshoe to escape his cell as a spacecraft lands outside the castle. The Game Warden tries to stop him, but Veidt stabs him with the horseshoe, revealing he created the Game Warden to be an adversary over the last eight years. The craft lifts off, showing that Veidt had spelled out "SAVE ME DAUGHTER" using the clones' bodies for Trieu's probe to capture. Veidt is encased in gold for the return trip. Trieu is shown to have recovered the craft after it crashed at the Clarks' farm, and kept Veidt as a statue in her vivarium garden since then. Trieu revives Veidt with an hour left before the Millennium Clock activates; Veidt is impressed that she successfully built the centrifuge, but is appalled that Trieu cloned her mother Bian. The centrifuge detaches from the clock and floats towards the Greenwood district of Tulsa, while Trieu and her staff set up equipment underneath it.

At the Kavalry headquarters, several high-ranking politicians arrive, revealed as members of Cyclops, including the elder Joe Keene Sr. Laurie discovers that Wade has disguised himself as one of the Kavalry, having survived the attack at his house. Doctor Manhattan is teleported to the headquarters following the Kavalry attack on Angela's house. While stripping into a copy of Doctor Manhattan's briefs, Joe explains to the gathered audience that Cyclops' original long-term plan was to revolt against President Robert Redford by arranging racially-charged events like the White Night. After discovering Manhattan's presence on Earth when one of the Kavalry members was teleported to New Mexico during the White Night, the Kavalry changed course and decided to obtain Manhattan's powers.

Angela shows up to try to stop the event, but Keene ignores her warning. He enters a booth, but just as the system is activated, the entire area is teleported to Greenwood by Trieu. Trieu explains she needed the Kavalry to capture Manhattan without him detecting her own involvement. Due to the Kavalry's ineffective safety measures, Keene is liquefied during the process as his remains spill across the area and into Manhattan's cage once Trieu opens the booth. Trieu proceeds to kill the Cyclops members on behalf of Will as revenge for their crimes against people of color. During this time, Manhattan uses Keene's liquid remains to circumvent the cage inhibiting his powers, teleporting Veidt, Laurie, and Wade to Karnak. Manhattan tells Angela he did not teleport her as he did not want to be alone when he dies, as Trieu activates the centrifuge to take Manhattan's powers. Manhattan tells Angela he loves her before he is destroyed and his powers are captured.

At Karnak, Veidt uses the device spawning the benign squid rains to generate a more destructive storm of frozen squid over Tulsa. Laurie calls Angela in time to allow her and Bian to take cover, while the squid rain destroys the centrifuge before the transfer of Manhattan's powers can be completed, killing Trieu when it falls onto her. Angela takes shelter at a nearby movie theater, where Will is waiting for her with her children. Will reveals Manhattan had made a deal with him and Trieu, having anticipated the events of the night in order to ensure his powers are not placed in the wrong hands.

Veidt offers Laurie and Wade Nite Owl's airship "Archie" (short for Archimedes in the original comic) to return to society. Laurie places Veidt under arrest, with Wade having a copy of Veidt's 1985 tape to President Redford on hand as evidence. After Veidt gets a positive answer on if Laurie will be going after President Redford, Wade knocks him out.

Angela invites Will to stay with her family as she takes her children back home. As she cleans up broken eggs from an argument between her and Manhattan earlier in the night, she recalls that Manhattan told her once that he could transfer his powers to someone else through an organic medium. Finding an unbroken egg, Angela goes to her pool, eats the egg, and prepares to walk on water across the swimming pool. The screen cuts to black as her foot touches the water.

== Production ==
Lindelof stated that the writers had decided early in production that the series finale would revolve around Lady Trieu attempting to take Doctor Manhattan's powers for herself. They had additionally written an idea for Senator Keene to have a mind control device capable of controlling the Seventh Kavalry and Tulsa police through their masks, which would culminate in Will taking control of the device. During production of subsequent episodes, the writers instead opted to have the Kavalry themselves attempt to capture Doctor Manhattan, and reworked Trieu's plot to work in conjunction with the Kavalry storyline. Additionally, the writers decided on a climax involving a squid attack over Tulsa, in hopes of evoking the city-wide devastation at the end of the original comic.

The episode uses the Spooky Tooth cover of "I Am the Walrus" by The Beatles as the credits song. Lindelof stated that "I Am the Walrus" is well known to have imaginative lyrics that The Beatles themselves have not offered to explain. Lindelof and the writers found ways to incorporate many of the song's lyrics into the episode. The episode's title, "See How They Fly," refers to the falling frozen squid, while other lyrics like "Pretty little policemen in a row" and "Yellow matter custard Dripping from a dead dog's eye" were reflected in visual elements of the episode.

Lindelof and his team had considered three possible endings of this episode: in addition to the one where Angela eats the egg and attempts to step onto the pool, they considered one where she simply crushed the egg in her hand, and another of putting the egg back into the carton and into the refrigerator. Staying with the choice where Angela eats the egg, they then debated how far they should go with the final shot, cutting the scene short to leave the implication vague. Lindelof said he does not consider the ending to be a cliffhanger, and that he intended to imply that Angela received Doctor Manhattan's powers via the egg.

== Reception ==
=== Critical response ===
On Rotten Tomatoes, "See How They Fly" received a 91% approval rating, based on an average 8.62 out of 10 rating from 23 reviews. The summary of the critical consensus is "With its interconnected storylines, stellar performances, and complex themes, "See How They Fly" does the impossible and ends Damon Lindelof's adaptation of Watchmen spectacularly."

=== Ratings ===
"See How They Fly" was watched by 935,000 viewers on its first live broadcast, and had over 1.6 million viewers when combined with repeated runs and streaming, exceeding the series' pilot viewership of 1.5 million.
