= She Was Killed by Space Junk =

- Watchmen episode
- Episode no.: Episode 3
- Directed by: Stephen Williams
- Written by: Damon Lindelof; Lila Byock
- Cinematography by: Xavier Grobet
- Editing by: Anna Hauger
- Production code: 103
- Original air date: November 3, 2019
- Running time: 53 minutes

Guest appearances
- Frances Fisher as Jane Crawford; James Wolk as Joseph Keene Jr.; Lee Tergesen as Mister Shadow; Dustin Ingram as Agent Dale Petey; Jessica Camacho as Pirate Jenny; David Andrews as Deputy Director Farragut; Lily Rose Smith as Rosie; Adelynn Spoon as Emma

Episode chronology
← Previous "Martial Feats of Comanche Horsemanship"	Next → "If You Don't Like My Story, Write Your Own"

"She Was Killed by Space Junk" is the third episode of the HBO superhero drama miniseries Watchmen, based on the 1986 DC Comics series of the same name by Alan Moore and Dave Gibbons. The episode was written by Damon Lindelof and Lila Byock and directed by Stephen Williams, and aired on November 3, 2019. It introduces the character of Laurie Blake (Jean Smart), formerly the vigilante Silk Spectre but now a member of the FBI's Anti-Vigilante's Task Force.

The title of the episode is a quotation from a song by Devo, "Space Junk."

== Synopsis ==
Laurie Blake - formerly the second Silk Spectre, but now a member of the FBI Anti-Vigilante Task Force - is instructed by Senator Joe Keene Jr. and the FBI to investigate the situation in Tulsa. Instead of a large team, she opts to only bring Dale Petey, a novice agent who is well-versed in the history of the Minutemen.

On arrival, Laurie finds the police are preparing for Judd's funeral and is concerned that a full investigation of Judd's death was not completed. Laurie and Dale meet Angela before the funeral, and Laurie offers to talk to Angela later. At the funeral, a Seventh Kavalry member wearing a bomb vest equipped with a dead man's switch emerges from a nearby tomb and seizes Senator Keene. Laurie uses a hidden gun to kill the hostage taker, and Angela drags his body into Judd's grave and pushes the casket atop it, smothering the explosion.

Police investigate the tomb. Laurie comes by as Angela explores the tunnel used by the Kavalry. Laurie makes it clear to Angela that she knows there are many questions around Judd's death, including the empty space in his closet where something had been hung and the wheelchair tracks near the tree Judd was lynched from. Angela remains cold to Laurie's warnings.

That night, Laurie pulls a large blue vibrator from her luggage, but after a moment, goes to sleep with Dale instead. Later, Laurie uses a special phone booth to leave a recorded message for Doctor Manhattan on Mars. She tells Manhattan an elaborate joke alluding to her former allies Nite Owl, Doctor Manhattan, and Ozymandias, shown in pieces throughout the episode. Exiting the booth, Laurie is nearly hit by Angela's car falling out of the sky. Laurie looks up to see Mars in the night sky, and lets out a laugh.

The Blonde Man unsuccessfully tests a survival suit made from equipment found around the castle on one of the Phillips clones. The Blonde Man declares he needs stronger material and attempts to hunt bison, but the Game Warden appears on a hillside to warn him off. The Blonde Man issues a defiant response to a written warning from the Game Warden about his imprisonment and signs it "Adrian Veidt", before preparing to return to hunt in his Ozymandias costume.

== Production ==
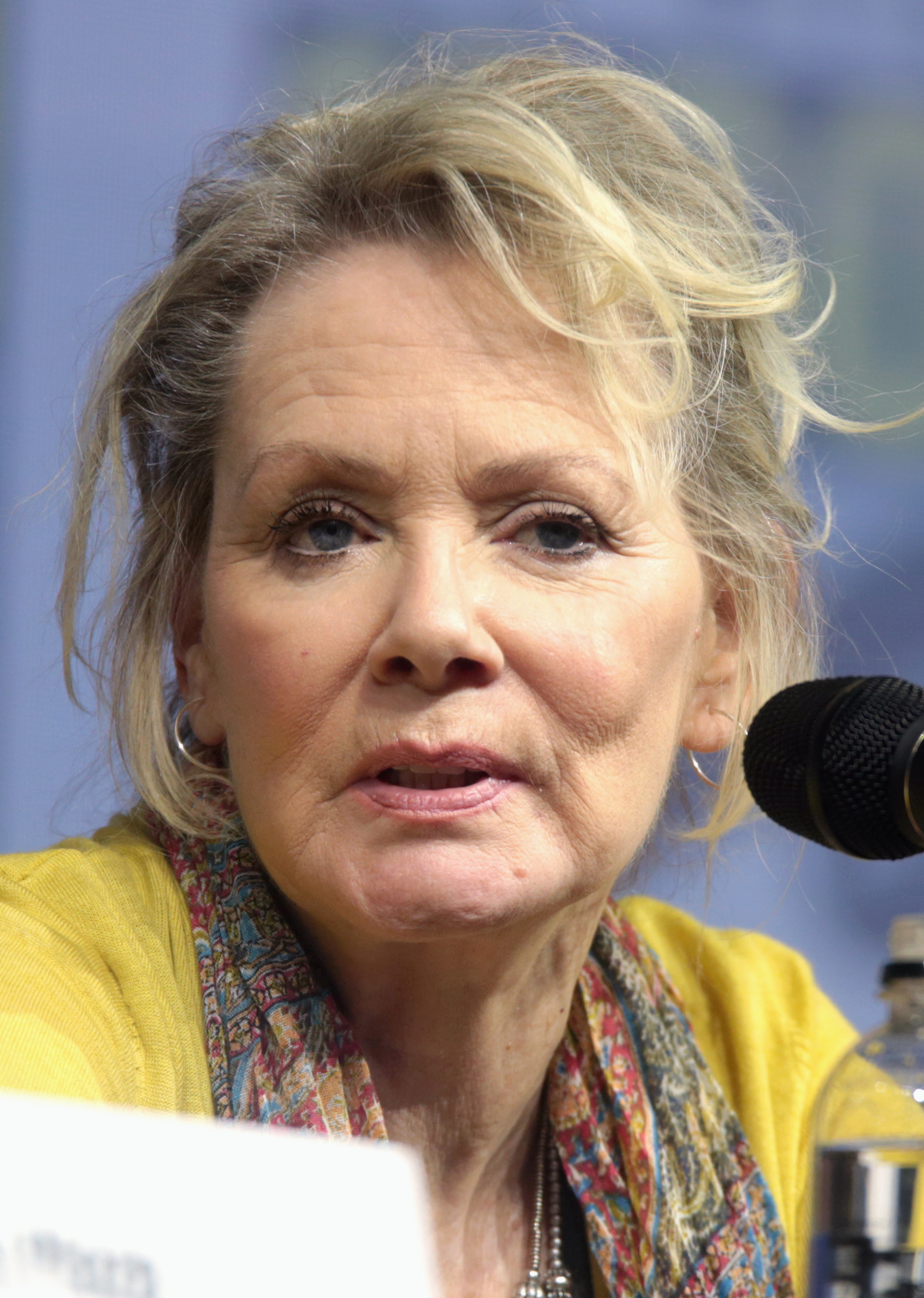
This episode introduces the character of Laurie Blake portrayed by Jean Smart, who received positive reviews for her performance.

"She Was Killed by Space Junk" is focused on the character of Laurie Blake, previously known as the second Silk Spectre, played by Jean Smart. Lindelof said that of the main characters from the Watchmen comic book, Laurie's was left unfinished: in the aftermath of the squid attack on New York City, Laurie joins up with Daniel Dreiberg, the second Nite Owl, to return to vigilantism despite it being outlawed, and considering if she will become like her father, Edward Blake known as The Comedian. Lindelof had to consider what would likely happen to Laurie in the thirty-years' time between the comic book and the television show: one idea he came up with was that Laurie had experienced how to be a vigilante in her mother's footsteps in the comic book, so in the years after, she would try to see what is like to do the same in her father's. From those combined experiences, Lindelof felt Laurie would come to see vigilantism as troublesome, and thus why she joined the FBI's Anti-Vigilante Task Force. As such, Laurie was written as a very defensive character, trusting few others and rarely showing feelings or talking about her past, having closed up on that period of her life. Lila Byock wrote Blake's scenes so that her level of agency would contrast with the younger Silk Spectre character in the comic book. She also explained that the vibrator scene was pitched as a joke until Lindelof responded approvingly. The Haliburton briefcase Blake uses to transport it has elicited comparisons to Pulp Fiction. Lindelof likened Laurie's character to that of Sigourney Weaver in Working Girl, and had considered Smart as an actor that could play a similar role. Smart had not read the graphic novel before hearing about the role, but signed on as she considered Laurie an interesting character with "all sorts of baggage" from her past.

The episode also affirmed that Jeremy Irons played Adrian Veidt, previously the vigilante Ozymandias. Up until this episode, HBO had publicized Irons' role under the alias "Blonde Man", though following the premiere, many television critics and viewers guessed Irons was playing Veidt. Damon Lindelof considered Veidt's return essential for the show, as Veidt was Lindelof's favorite character from the original comic book limited series and who raised a number of "contradictory feelings" when considering how to write for him. Lindelof said that while Veidt within the Watchmen comic book was nearly in full control of every action, he wanted to write Veidt in a situation where events were out of his control. Irons said he was drawn to play the character after hearing a summary of Veidt's story from the original comic book series and the ideas he had for Veidt in the television show, calling the character an "enigma" and that the proposed role "was fascinating, off-the-wall, bizarre and thoroughly mesmeric to play".

The opening of the show features Laurie Blake leading a faked bank robbery to capture the vigilante Mister Shadow, played by Lee Tergesen. Mister Shadow was written as a parody of Batman. Costume designer Meghan Kasperlik drew out a Batman-like outfit which had included high-tech gadgetry, which became part of Mister Shadow's character as a rich person with too much money using it for crime-fighting. The costume was fabricated with help of one of the local Atlanta fabricators that had previously done work on the various Marvel Cinematic Universe films. The episode's exact title is a line taken from the lyrics of "Space Junk" from the Devo album Q: Are We Not Men? A: We Are Devo!, which Laurie is shown listening to when Senator Keene arrives.

== Reception ==
=== Critical ===
On Rotten Tomatoes, the episode has an approval rating of 100% with an average score of 8.82 out of 10, based on 31 reviews. The site's summary states "Not only does Jean Smart's brilliant performance as the former vigilante turned FBI agent Laurie Blake raise the stakes, but her arrival in Tulsa connects "She Was Killed by Space Junk" to its comic book past in an exciting way."

=== Ratings ===
The episode had an estimate 648,000 viewers on the first night of broadcast.
