= George Catlin =

American painter and adventurer (1796–1872)

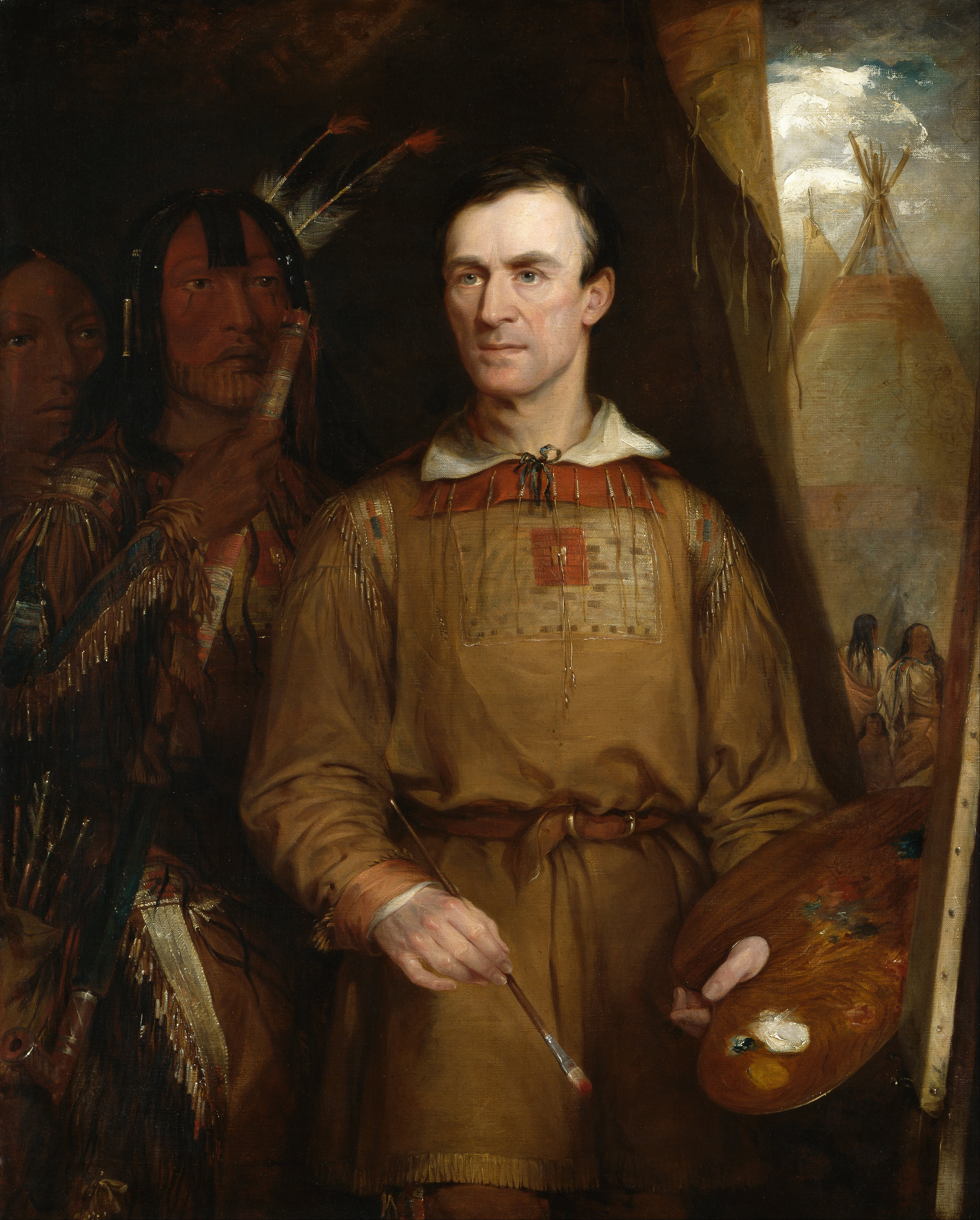
- George Catlin by William Fisk, 1849
- Born: July 26, 1796; Wilkes-Barre, Pennsylvania, U.S.
- Died: December 23, 1872 (aged 76); Jersey City, New Jersey, U.S.
- Education: Litchfield Law School
- Occupations: Lawyer; Painter; Author
- Spouse: Clara Bartlett Gregory (m. 1828; died 1845)
- Children: 4

George Catlin (/kætlɪn/ KAT-lin; July 26, 1796 – December 23, 1872) was an American lawyer, painter, author, and traveler, who specialized in portraits of Native Americans in the American frontier. Traveling to the American West five times during the 1830s, Catlin wrote about and painted portraits that depicted the life of the Plains Indians. His early work included engravings, drawn from nature, of sites along the route of the Erie Canal in New York State. Several of his renderings were published in one of the first printed books to use lithography, Cadwallader D. Colden's Memoir, Prepared at the Request of a Committee of the Common Council of the City of New York, and Presented to the Mayor of the City, at the Celebration of the Completion of the New York Canals, published in 1825, with early images of the City of Buffalo.

== Early life and education ==
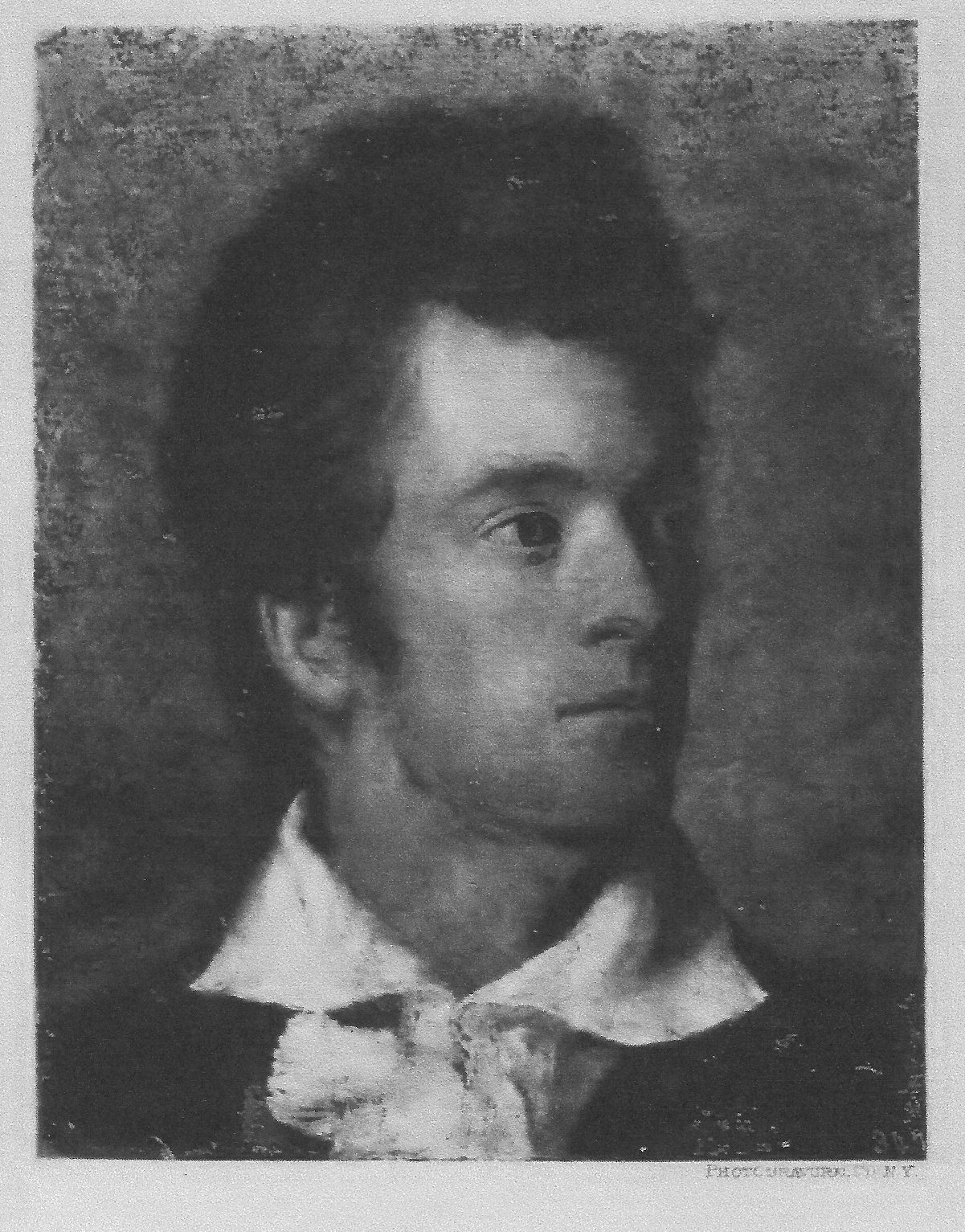
Self-portrait, aged 28

Catlin was born in 1796 in Wilkes-Barre, Pennsylvania. While growing up, George encountered "trappers, hunters, explorers and settlers who stayed with his family on their travels west". Catlin was also intrigued by stories told to him by his mother, Polly Sutton, who had been captured by Indians during the 1778 Battle of Wyoming in Pennsylvania. Like his father, Catlin trained at Litchfield Law School when he was 17, although he disliked the field of law. He was admitted to the Bar in 1819 and practiced law for two years before giving it up to travel and study art.

In 1823, he studied art in Philadelphia and became known for his work as a portraitist. After a meeting with "tribal delegation of Indians from the western frontier, Catlin became eager to preserve a record of Native American customs and individuals".

== Career ==
=== Travels ===
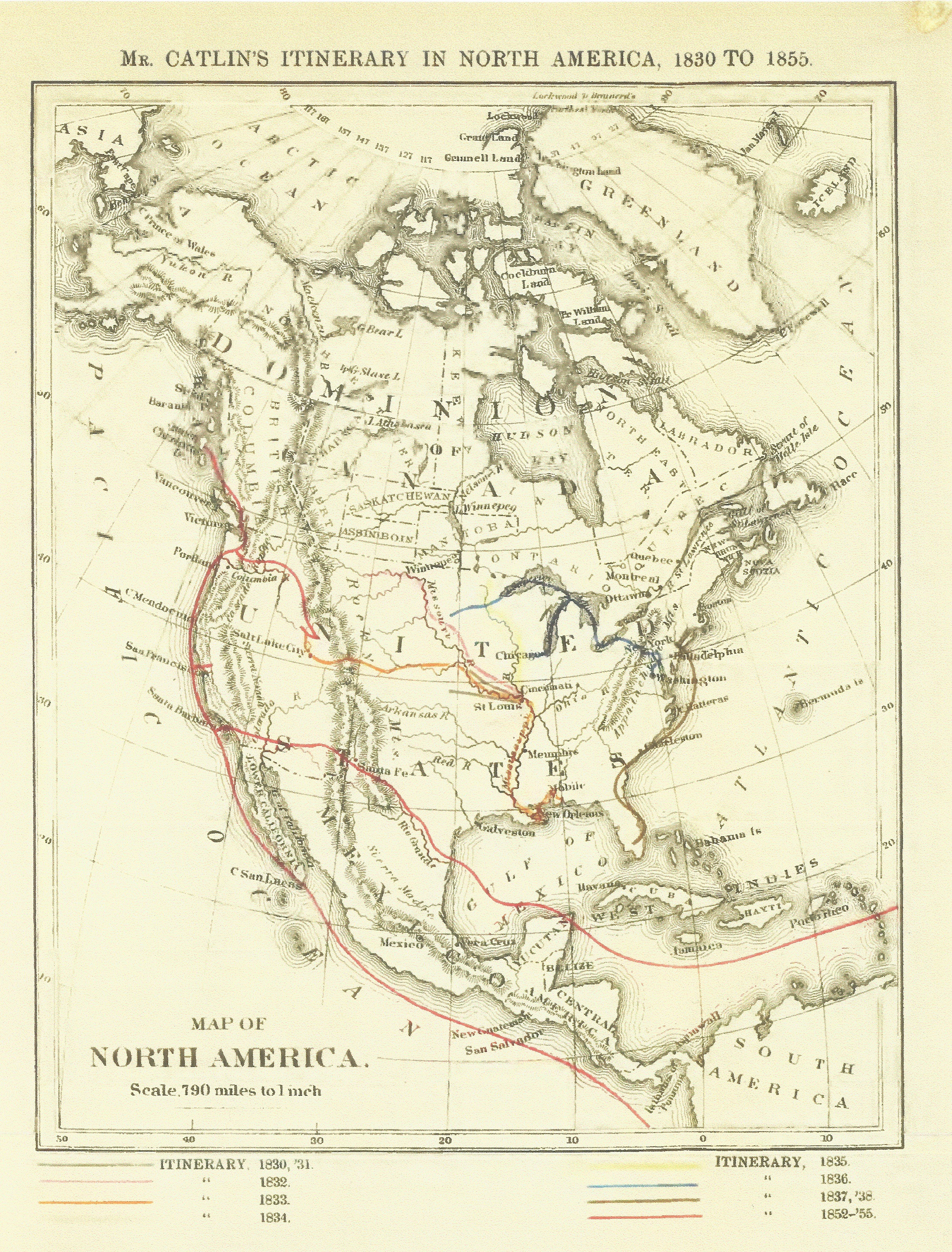
Catlin's travels in North America between 1830 and 1855

Catlin began his journey in 1830 when he accompanied Governor William Clark on a diplomatic mission up the Mississippi River into Native American territory. St. Louis became Catlin's base of operations for five trips he took between 1830 and 1836, eventually visiting fifty tribes. Two years later he ascended the Missouri River more than 3000 km (1900 miles) to Fort Union Trading Post, near what is now the North Dakota-Montana border, where he spent several weeks among indigenous people who were still relatively untouched by European culture.

He visited eighteen tribes, including the Pawnee, Omaha, and Ponca in the south and the Mandan, Hidatsa, Cheyenne, Crow, Assiniboine, and Blackfeet to the north. There he produced the most vivid and penetrating portraits of his career. During later trips along the Arkansas, Red, and Mississippi rivers, as well as visits to Florida and the Great Lakes, he produced more than 500 paintings and gathered a substantial collection of artifacts.

=== Indigenous gallery ===
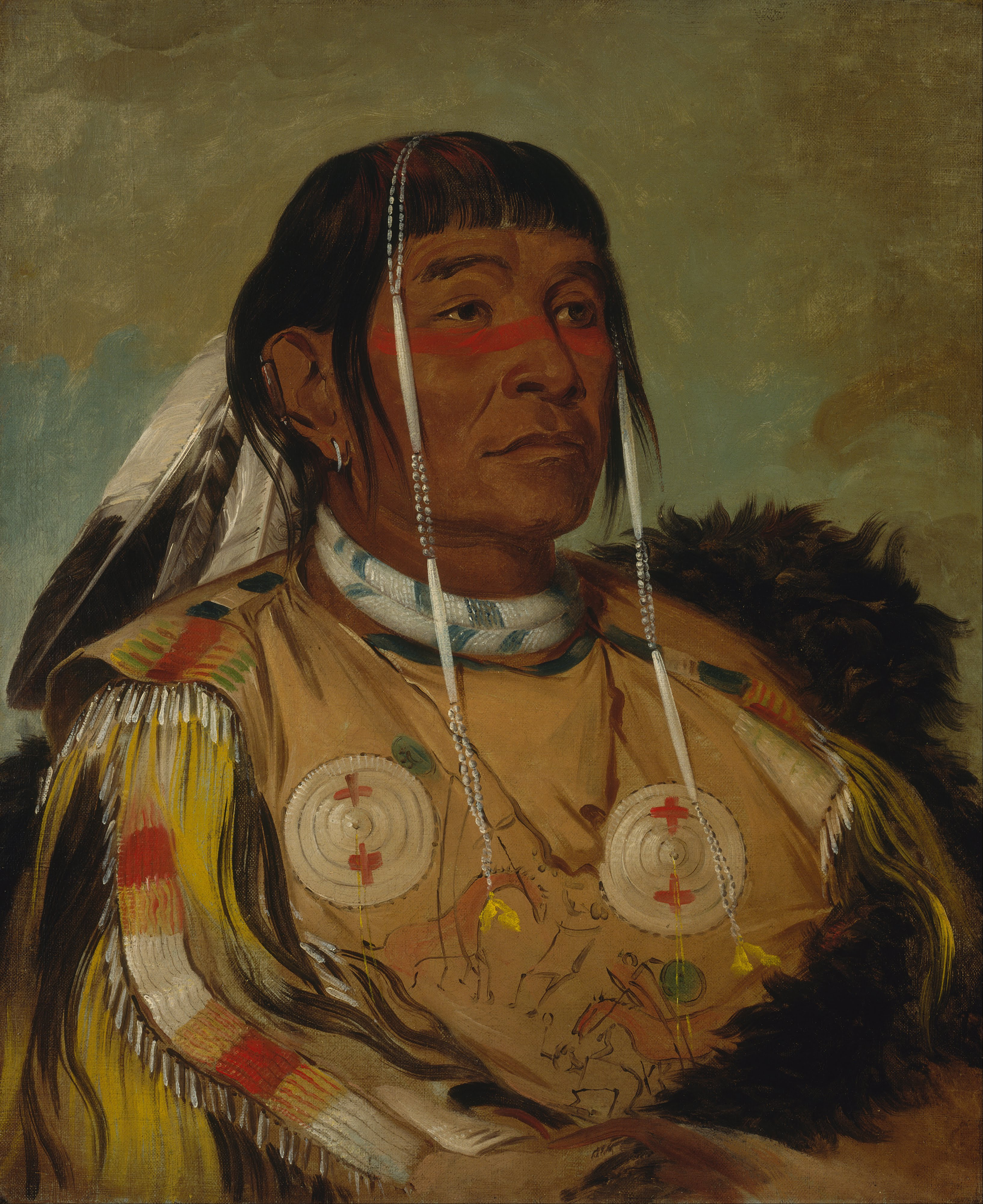
Sha-có-pay, The Six, Chief of the Plains Ojibwa, an 1832 portrait at Fort Union that is now housed in the Smithsonian American Art Museum in Washington, D.C.

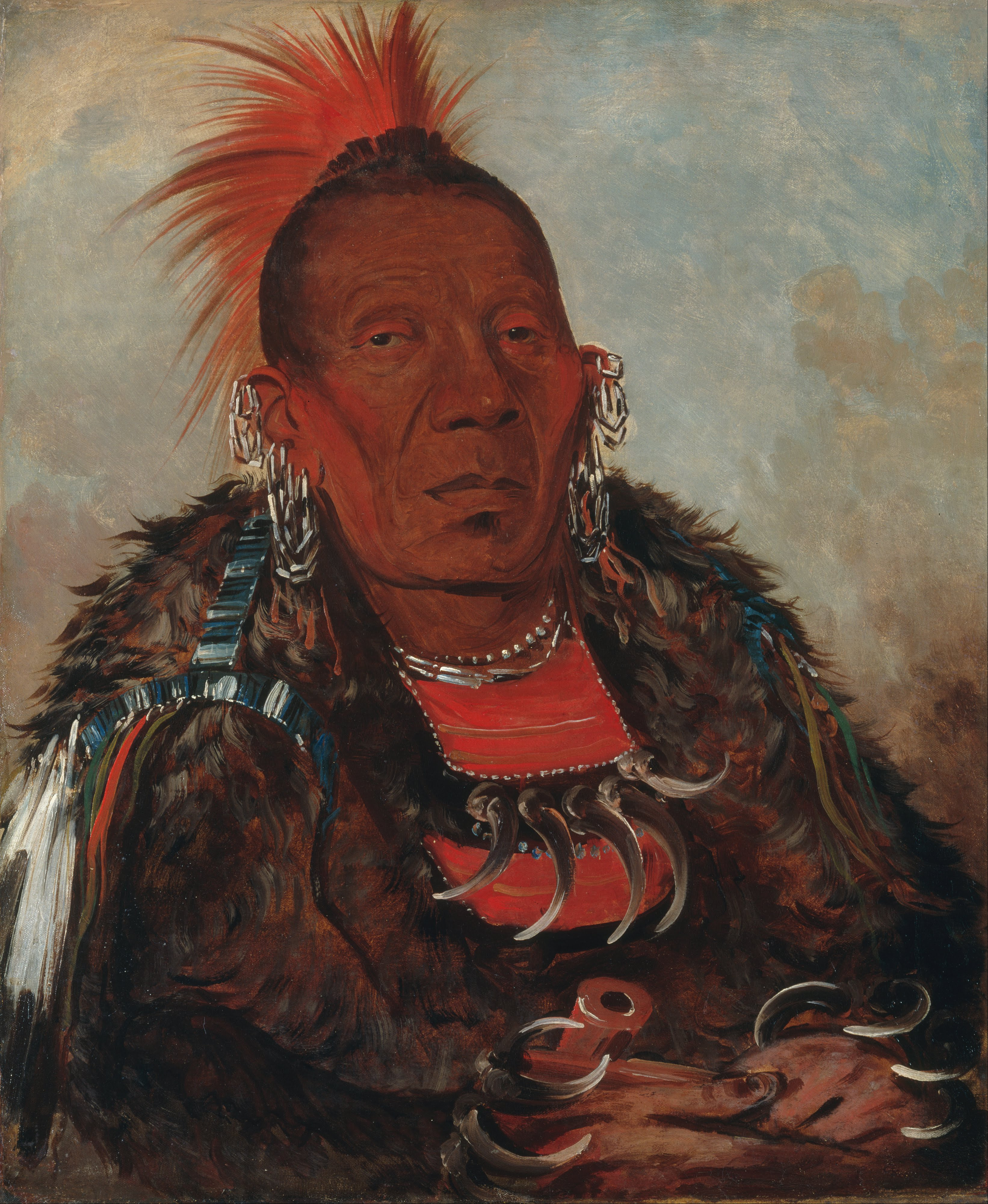
Wah-ro-née-sah, The Surrounder, Chief of the Otoe Tribe, an 1832 portrait now housed in the Smithsonian American Art Museum

When Catlin returned east in 1838, he assembled the paintings and numerous artifacts into his Indian Gallery, and began delivering public lectures that drew on his personal recollections of life among the American Indians. Catlin traveled with his Indian Gallery to major cities such as Pittsburgh, Cincinnati, and New York City. He hung his paintings salon style, side by side and one above another. Visitors identified each painting by the number on the frame, as listed in Catlin's catalogue. Soon after, he began a lifelong effort to sell his collection to the U.S. government. The touring Indian Gallery did not attract the paying public Catlin needed to stay financially sound, and the United States Congress rejected his initial petition to purchase the works.

In 1839, Catlin took his collection across the Atlantic for a tour of European capitals. As a showman and entrepreneur, he initially attracted crowds to his Indian Gallery in London, Brussels, and Paris. The French critic Charles Baudelaire remarked on Catlin's paintings, "He has brought back alive the proud and free characters of these chiefs, both their nobility and manliness."

Catlin wanted to sell his Indian Gallery to the U.S. government to have his life's work preserved intact. His continued attempts to persuade various officials in Washington, D.C. to buy the collection failed. In 1852, he was forced to sell the original Indian Gallery, now 607 paintings, due to personal debts. The industrialist Joseph Harrison acquired the paintings and artifacts, which he stored in a factory in Philadelphia, as security.

Catlin spent the last 20 years of his life trying to re-create his collection, and recreated more than 400 paintings. This second collection of paintings is known as the "Cartoon Collection", since the works are based on the outlines he drew of the works from the 1830s.

In 1841, Catlin published Manners, Customs, and Condition of the North American Indians, in two volumes, with approximately 300 engravings. Three years later he published 25 plates, entitled Catlin's North American Indian Portfolio, and, in 1848, Eight Years' Travels and Residence in Europe.

From 1852 to 1857, he traveled through South and Central America and later returned for further exploration in the American West Coast. The record of these later years is contained in Last Rambles amongst the Indians of the Rocky Mountains and the Andes (1868) and My Life among the Indians (ed. by N. G. Humphreys, 1909). Paintings of his Spanish American Indians are published.

In 1872, Catlin traveled to Washington, D.C. at the invitation of Joseph Henry, the first secretary of the Smithsonian. Until his death later that year in Jersey City, New Jersey, Catlin worked in a studio at the Smithsonian Institution's "Castle". In 1879, Harrison's widow donated his original Indian Gallery, more than 500 works, along with related artifacts, to the Smithsonian.

The nearly complete surviving set of Catlin's first Indian Gallery, painted in the 1830s, is now part of the Smithsonian American Art Museum's collection. The associated Catlin artifacts are in the collections of the Department of Anthropology, National Museum of Natural History, Smithsonian. Some 700 sketches are held by the American Museum of Natural History in New York City. Some artifacts from Catlin are in the University of Pennsylvania Museum of Archaeology and Anthropology collections. The Huntington Library in San Marino, California also holds 239 of Catlin's illustrations of both North and South American Indians, and other illustrative and manuscript material by Catlin.

The accuracy of some of Catlin's observations has been questioned. He claimed to be the first white man to see the Minnesota pipestone quarries, and pipestone was named catlinite. Catlin exaggerated various features of the site, and his boastful account of his visit aroused his critics, who disputed his claim of being the first white man to investigate the quarry. Previous recorded white visitors include the Groselliers and Radisson, Father Louis Hennepin, Baron de Lahontan, and others. Lewis and Clark noted the pipestone quarry in their journals in 1805. The fur trader Philander Prescott had written another account of the area in 1831.

== Later works ==
After the sale of Catlin's Indian Gallery was rebuffed by the U.S. Congress in May 1838, Catlin felt he could find a more receptive audience in Europe and moved his family to England in November 1839, then to Paris in 1845, and eventually lived in some obscurity in Ostend.

Le Chat d'Ostende is one of the most unusual paintings in Catlin's later oeuvre, dated 1868 and inscribed with the title on the stretcher. It has been called "a folky depiction of a playful cat that bore much of the same technique, wonderment and enthusiasm exhibited in the artist's later depiction of Native Americans". In 1871, after an absence of more than three decades, Catlin returned to the United States and likely brought back the painting with him.

It resurfaced in 1957 in the private collection of Lee B. Anderson, a pioneer collector of American art, and was subsequently sold at Christies for $47,000 on May 24, 2000. The painting reflects a playful quiet domesticity that contrasts sharply from the American bison that thundered across the Great Plains of the American West in the millions. The majestic long-haired cat itself bears some resemblance to a bison and exhibits a human-like face that may be a self-portrait given the play on words inherent in the subject matter and the artist's surname.

== Observations on Native nose-breathing practices ==
Catlin is also remembered for his research and writing on mouth breathing, inspired by observations made during his travels. This interest is linked to his non-fiction work, The Breath of Life, later retitled as Shut Your Mouth and Save Your Life, in 1862. It was based on his experiences traveling through the West, where he observed a consistent lifestyle habit among all of the Native American communities he encountered: a preference for nose breathing over mouth breathing. He also observed that they had perfectly straight teeth.

He repeatedly heard that this was because they believed that mouth breathing made an individual weak and caused disease, while nasal breathing made the body strong and prevented disease. He observed that mothers repeatedly closed the mouth of their infants while they were sleeping, in order to instill nasal breathing as a habit. He wrote the book to document these observations, stating that "there is no person in society but who will find... improvement in health and enjoyment..." from keeping his or her mouth shut.

== Family and death ==
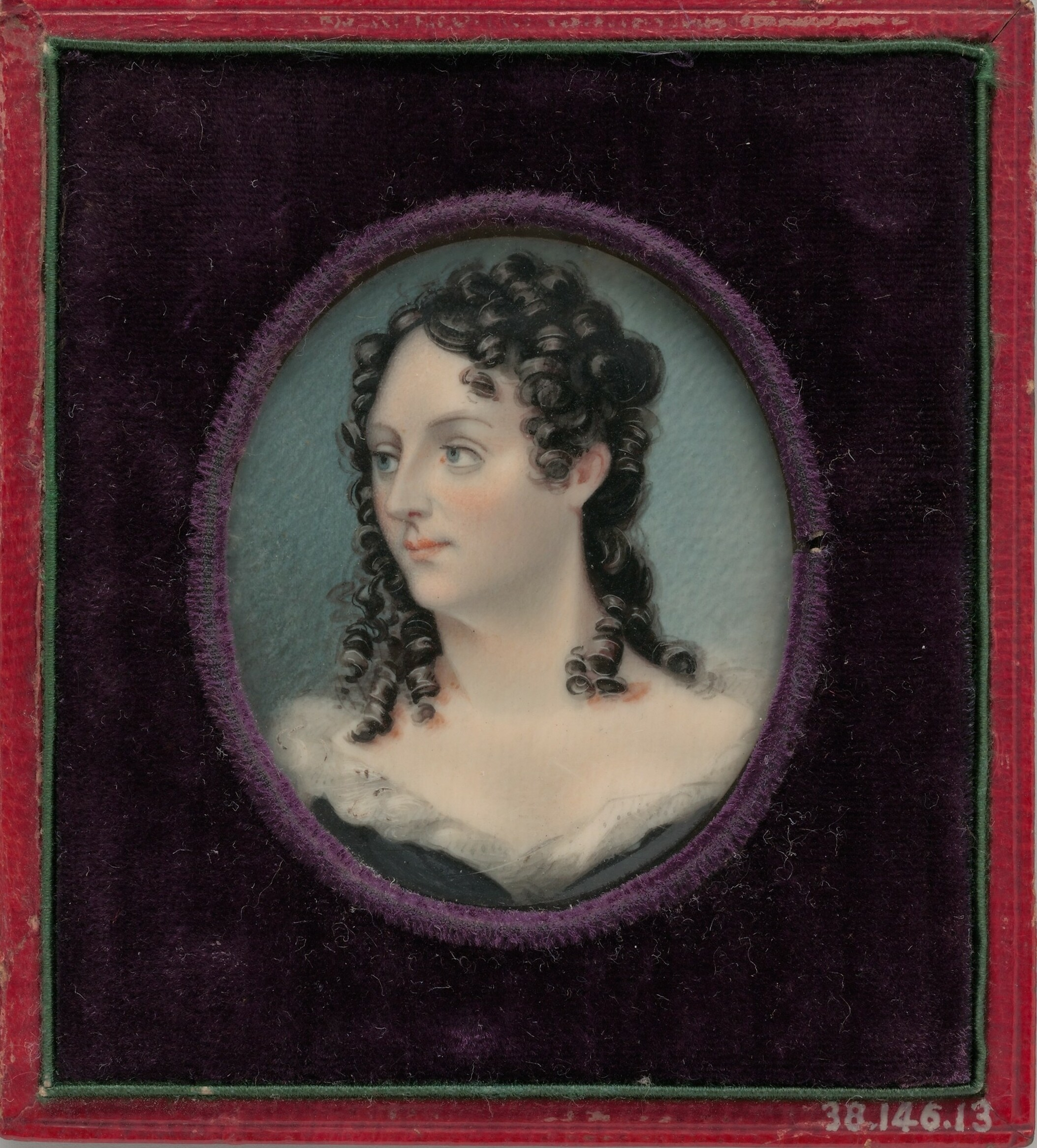
A portrait of Clara Bartlett Gregory by Catlin, c. 1830, now housed in the Metropolitan Museum of Art

George Catlin met Clara Bartlett Gregory in 1828 in her hometown of Albany, New York. She was eager to escape her family home, not getting along with her father's third wife. After a brief courtship, Clara and George married on May 11, 1828. She was 19, and Catlin was 32. After their marriage, she accompanied him on one of his journeys west. They eventually had four children. Clara and his youngest son died of consumption while visiting Paris in 1845.

Catlin died on December 23, 1872, aged 76 years in Jersey City, New Jersey. He is buried in Green-Wood Cemetery, Brooklyn, with his wife and two of their children.

== Honors ==
- National Rivers Hall of Fame, inducted 2001
- Luzerne County Arts & Entertainment Hall of Fame, inducted 2023

== In popular culture ==
Catlin and his work figure repeatedly in the 2010 novel Shadow Tag by Louise Erdrich, where he is the subject of the unfinished doctoral dissertation by the character Irene America.

His 1834 painting Comanche Feats of Horsemanship was featured in the second episode of the HBO drama series Watchmen, "Martial Feats of Comanche Horsemanship", which was named for the painting.

== Gallery ==
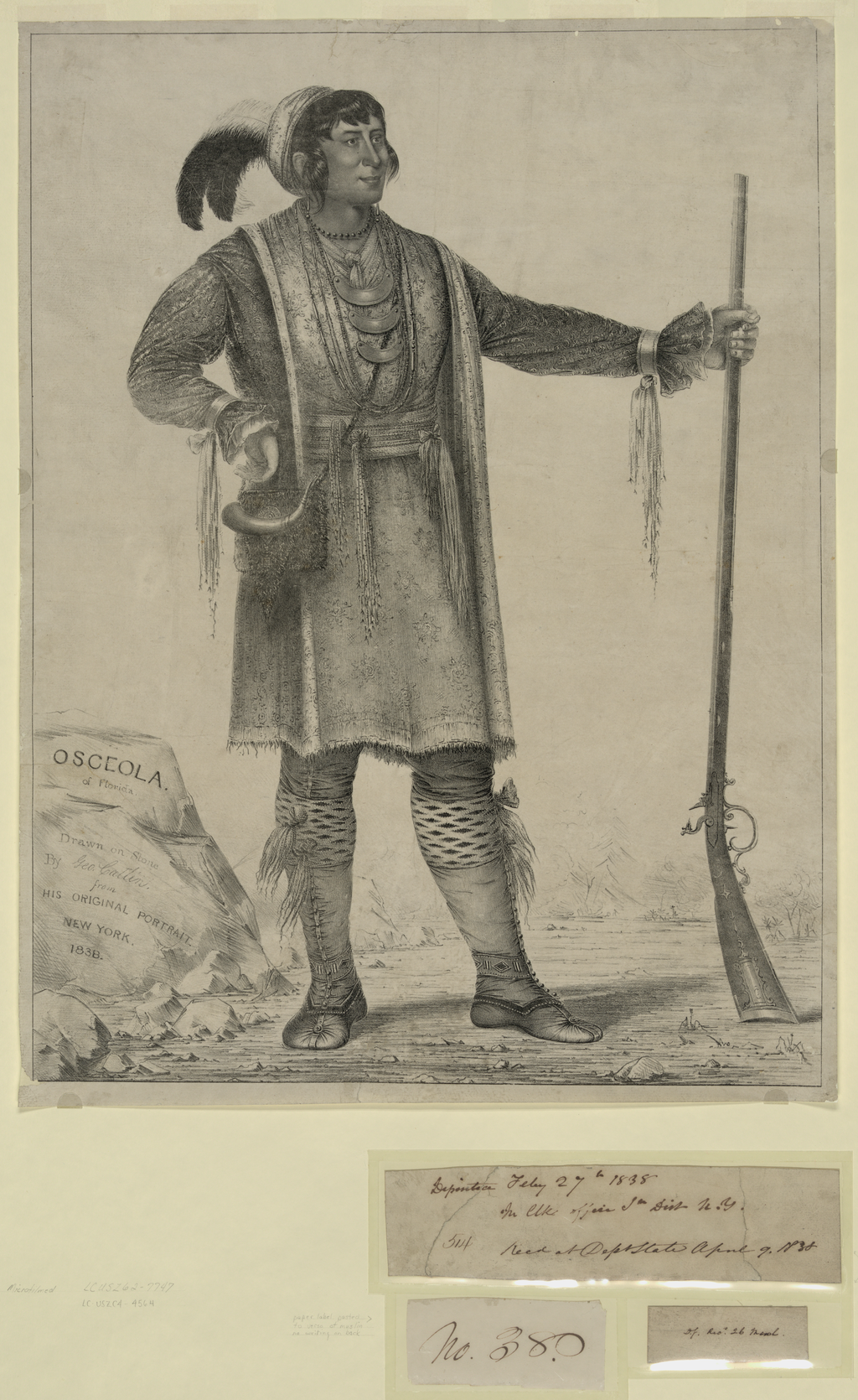
Osceola of Florida, Drawn on Stone by Geo. Catlin, from his Original Portrait

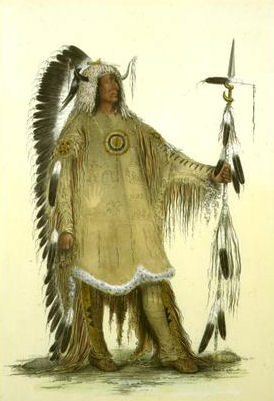
Mah-to-toh-pe by George Catlin

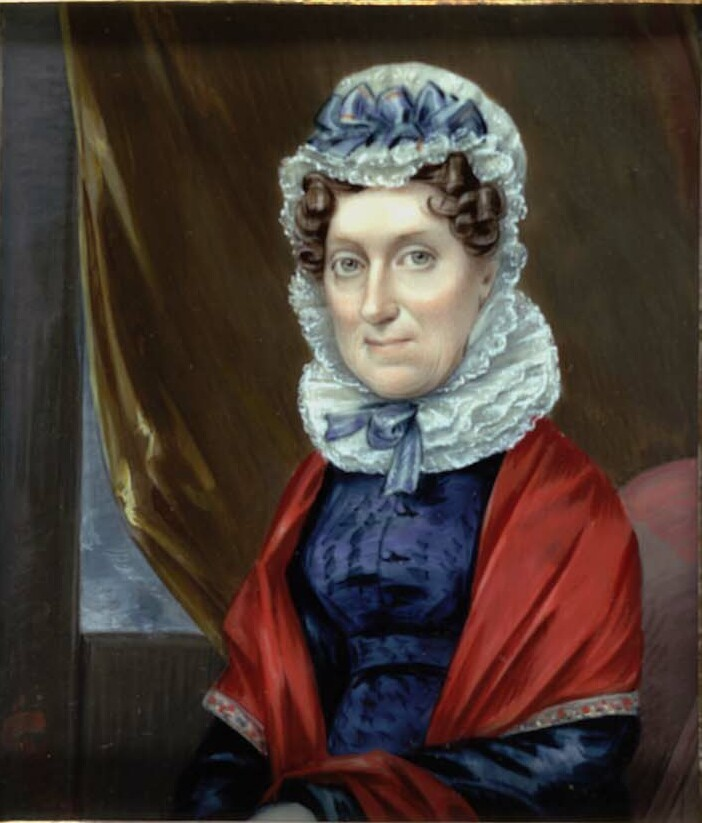
Mrs. Putnam Catlin (Mary "Polly" Sutton), 1825 (Smithsonian American Art Museum)

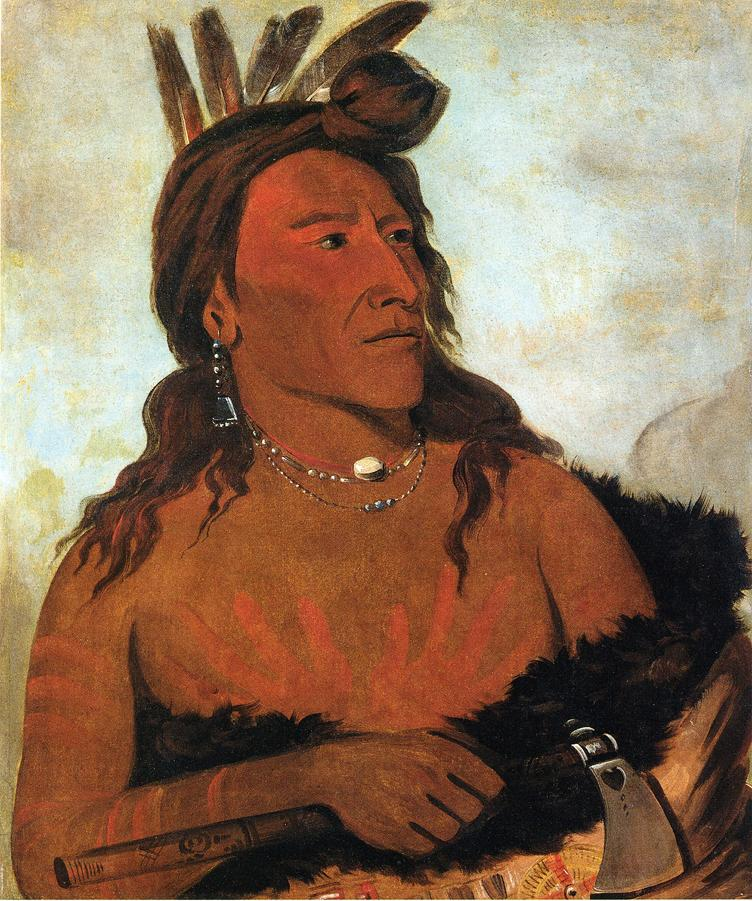
Little Bear, Hunkpapa Brave, 1832 (Smithsonian American Art Museum)

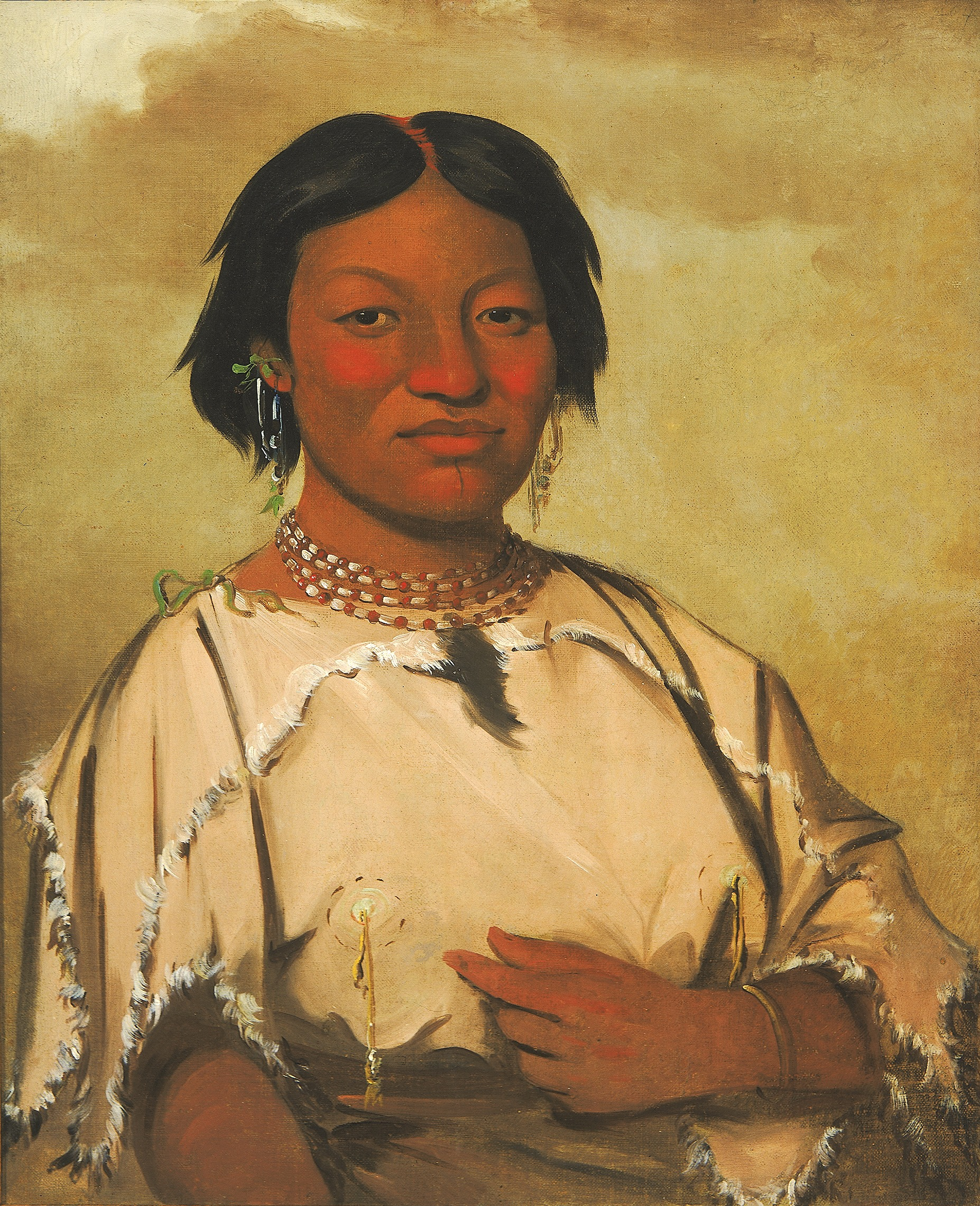
Oó-je-en-á-he‑a, Woman Who Lives in a Bear's Den, 1832 (Smithsonian American Art Museum)

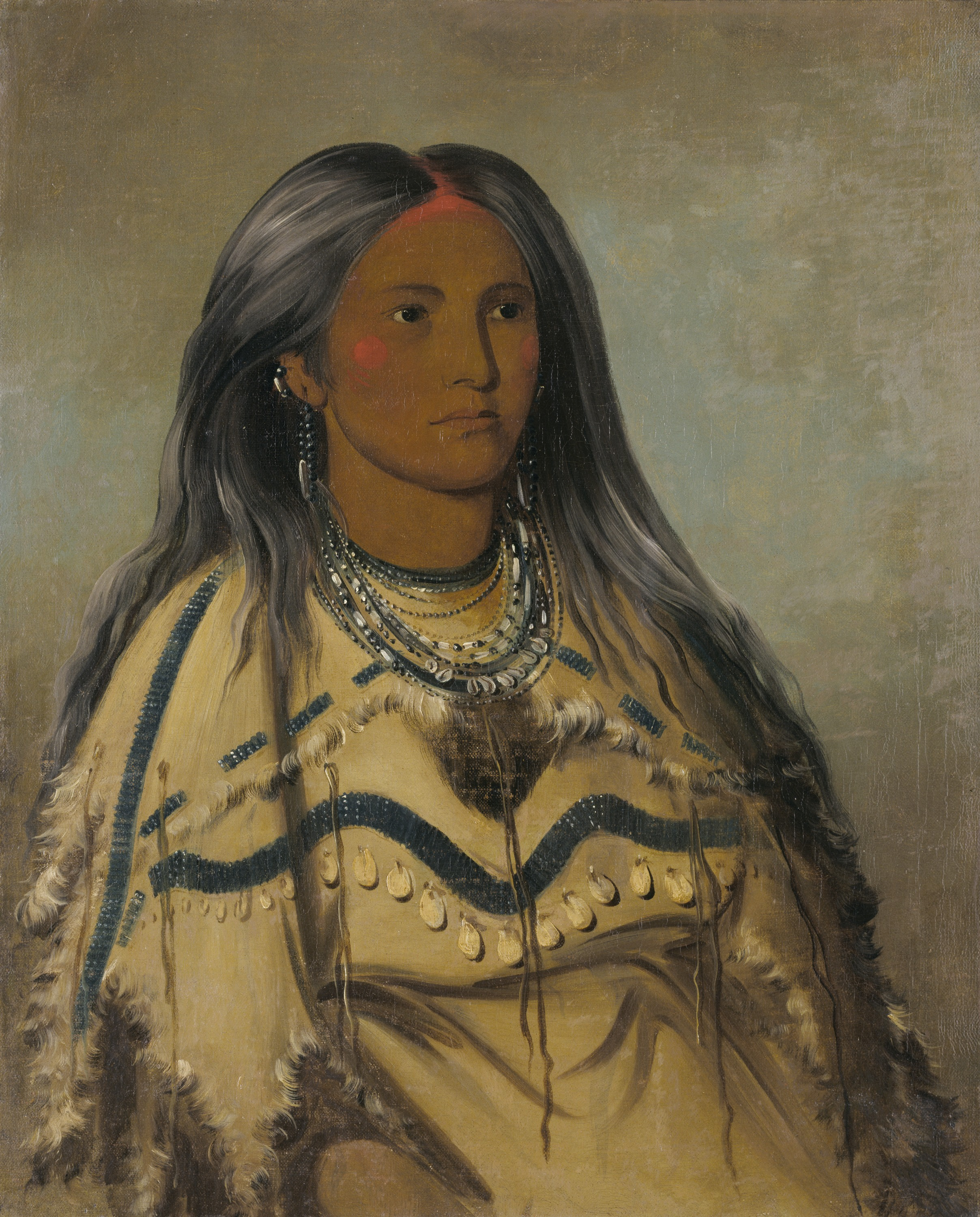
Sha-kó-ka, Mint, a Pretty Girl, 1832 (Smithsonian American Art Museum)

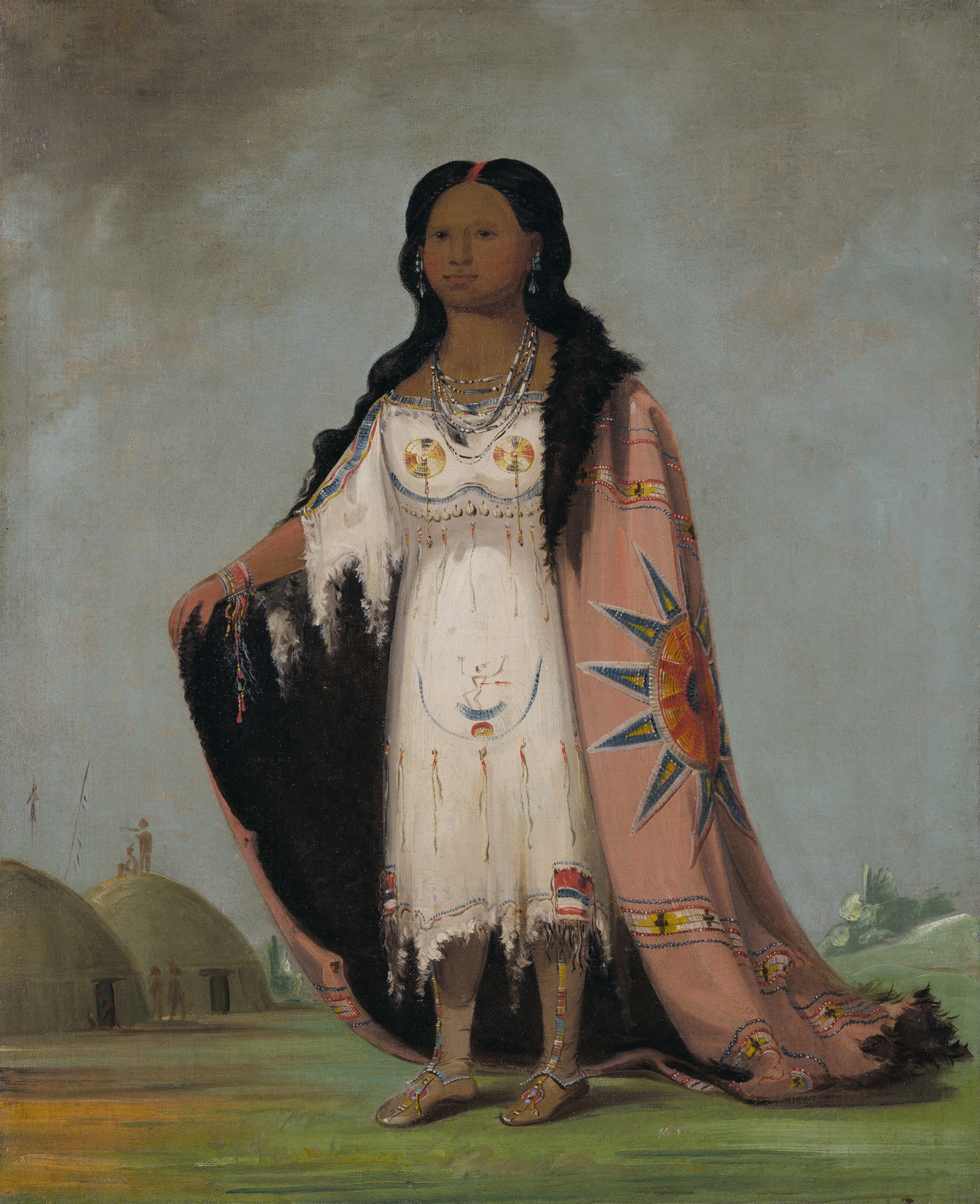
Pshán-shaw, Sweet-scented Grass, Twelve-year-old Daughter of Bloody Hand, 1832 (Smithsonian American Art Museum)

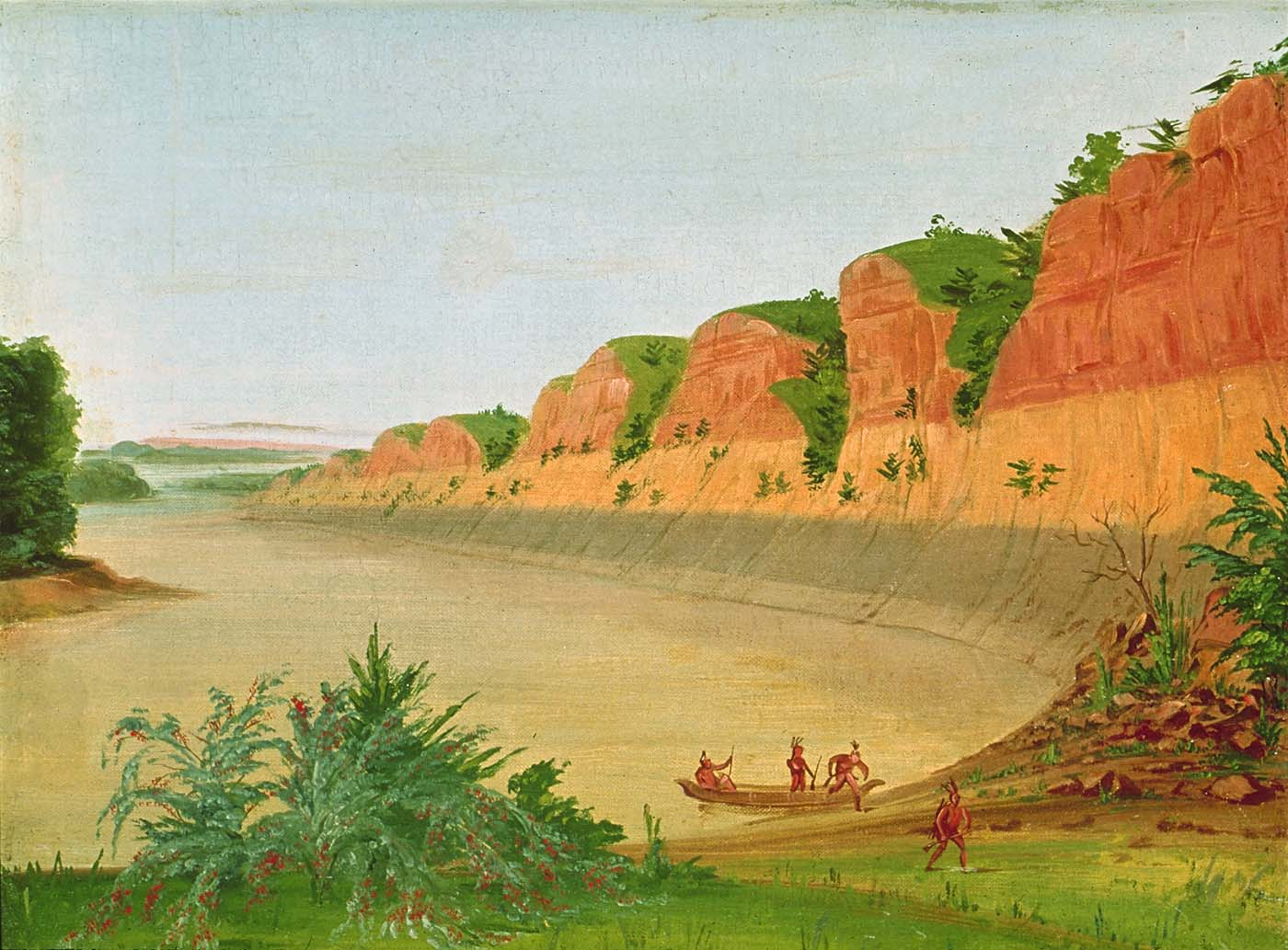
South Side of Buffalo Island, Showing Buffalo Berries in the Foreground, 1832 (Smithsonian American Art Museum)

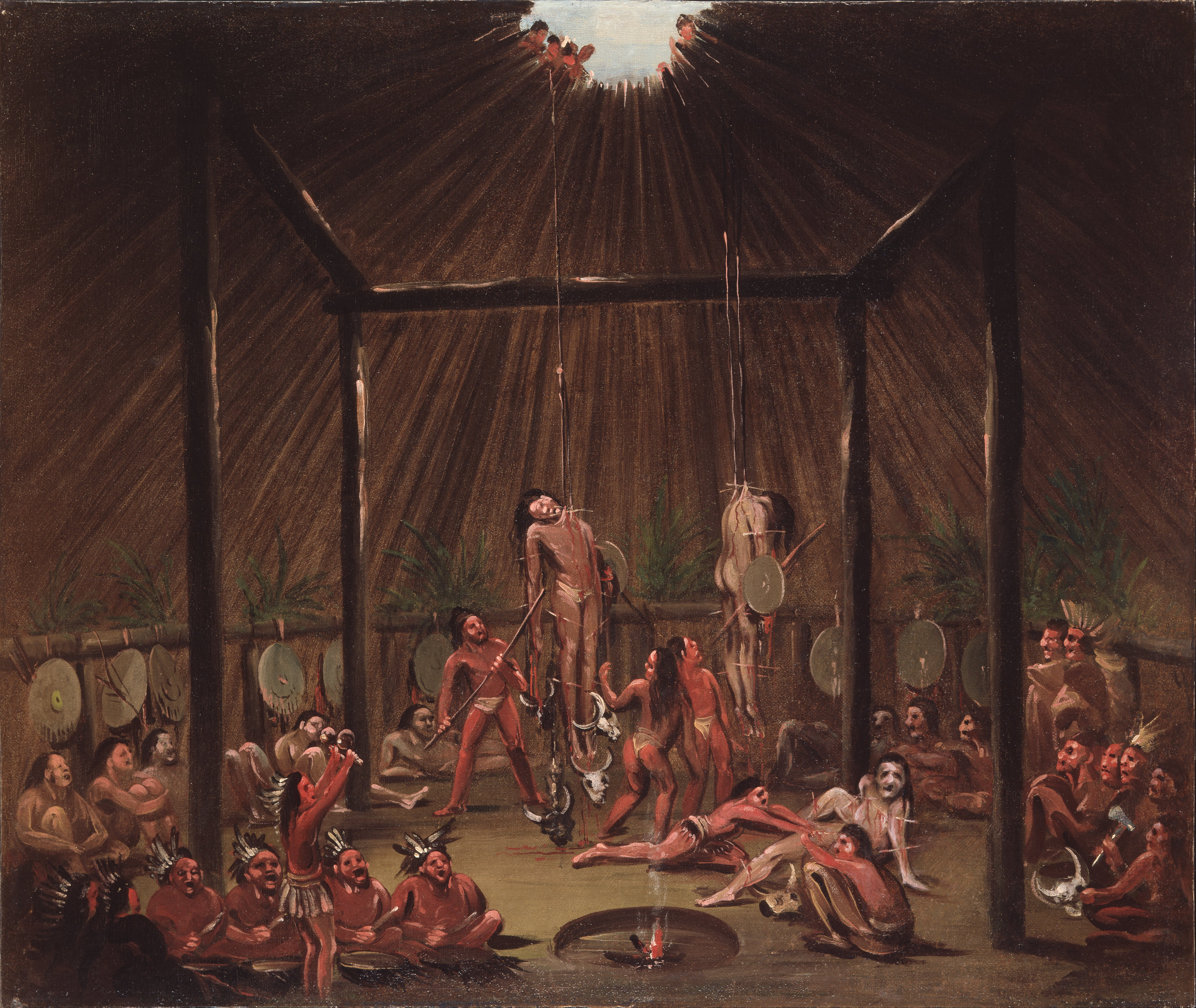
The Cutting Scene, Mandan O-kee-pa Ceremony, 1832 (Denver Art Museum)

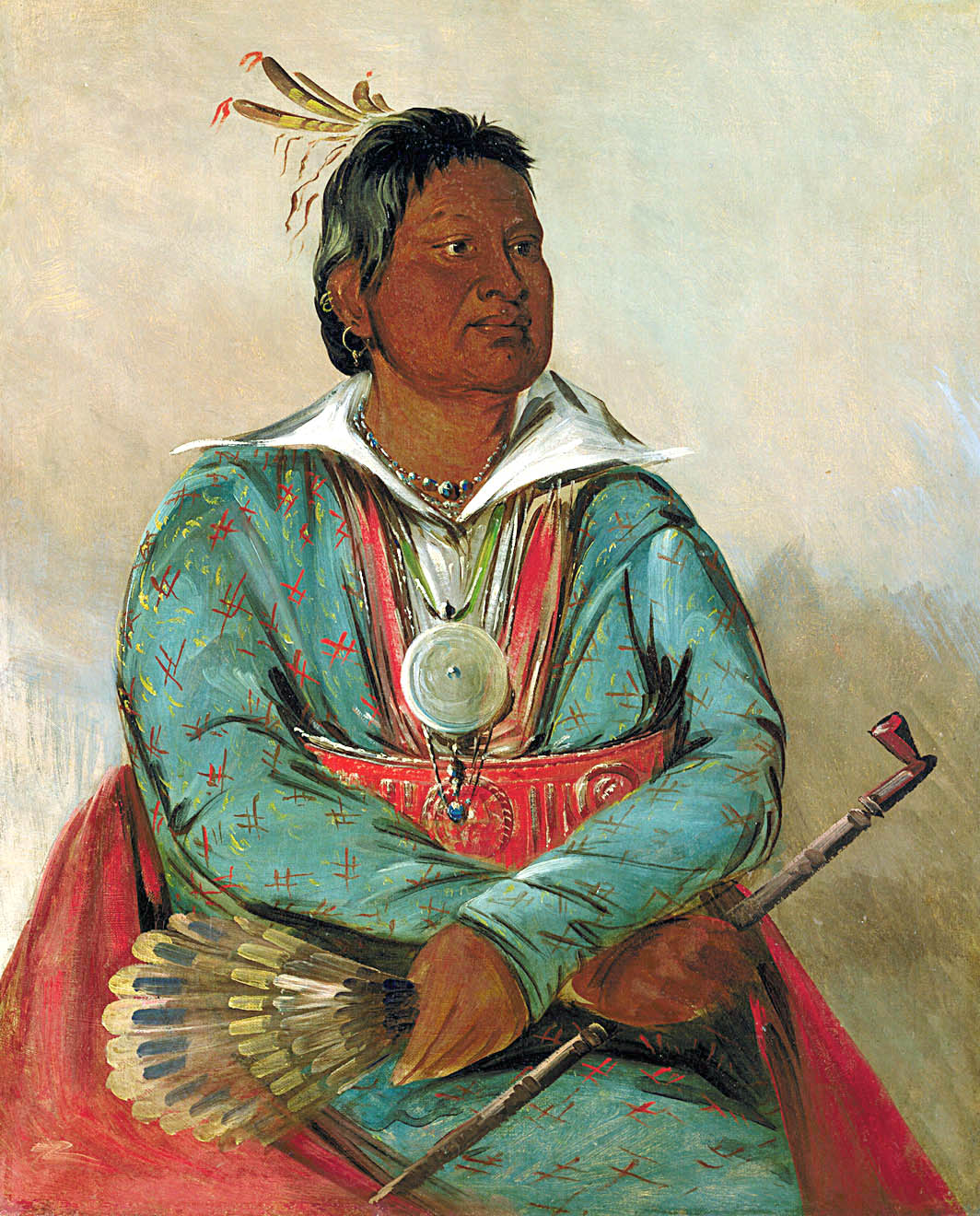
Mó-sho-la-túb-bee, He Who Puts Out and Kills, Chief of the Choctaw Tribe, 1834

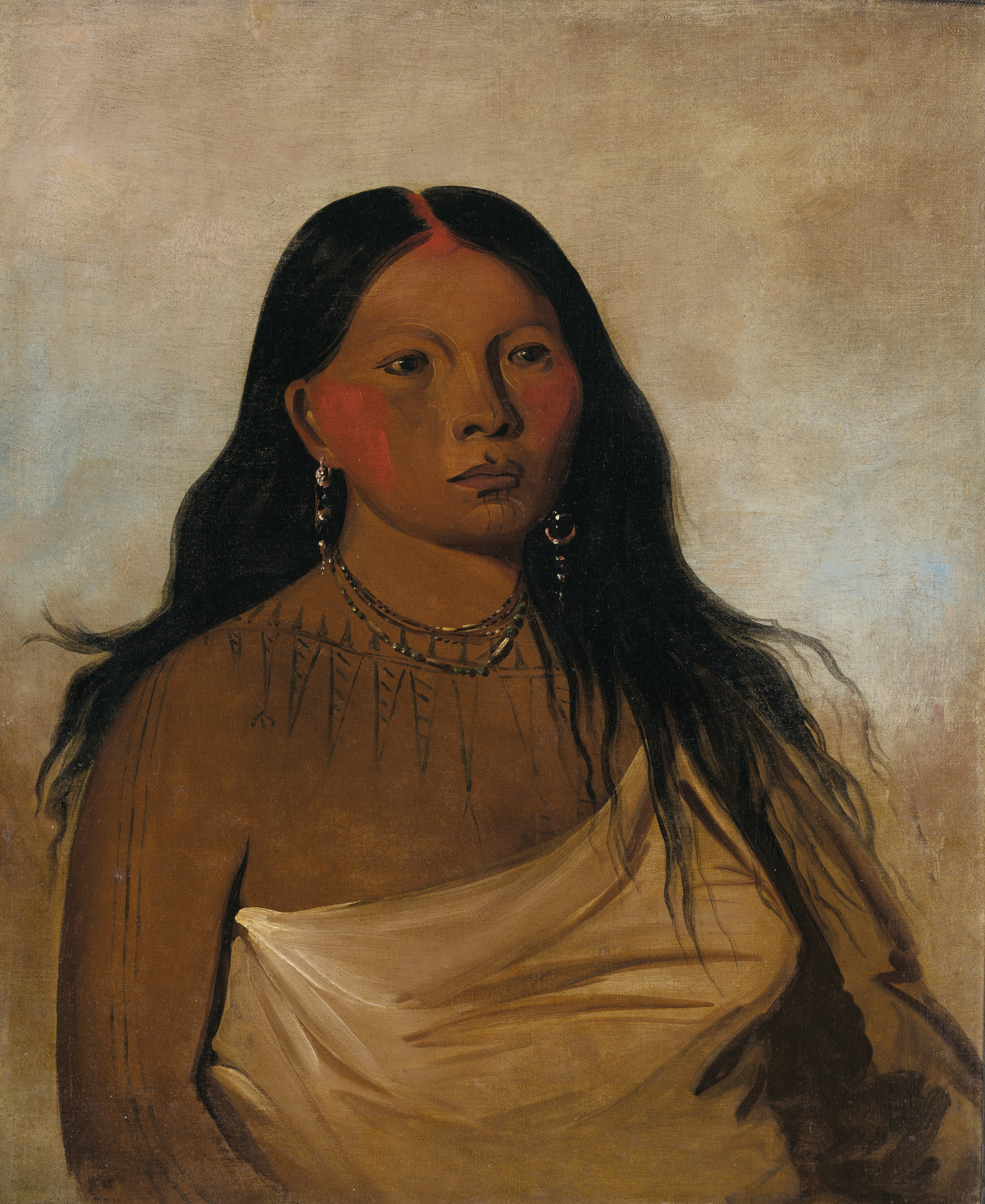
Káh-kée-tsee, Thighs, a Wichita Woman, 1834

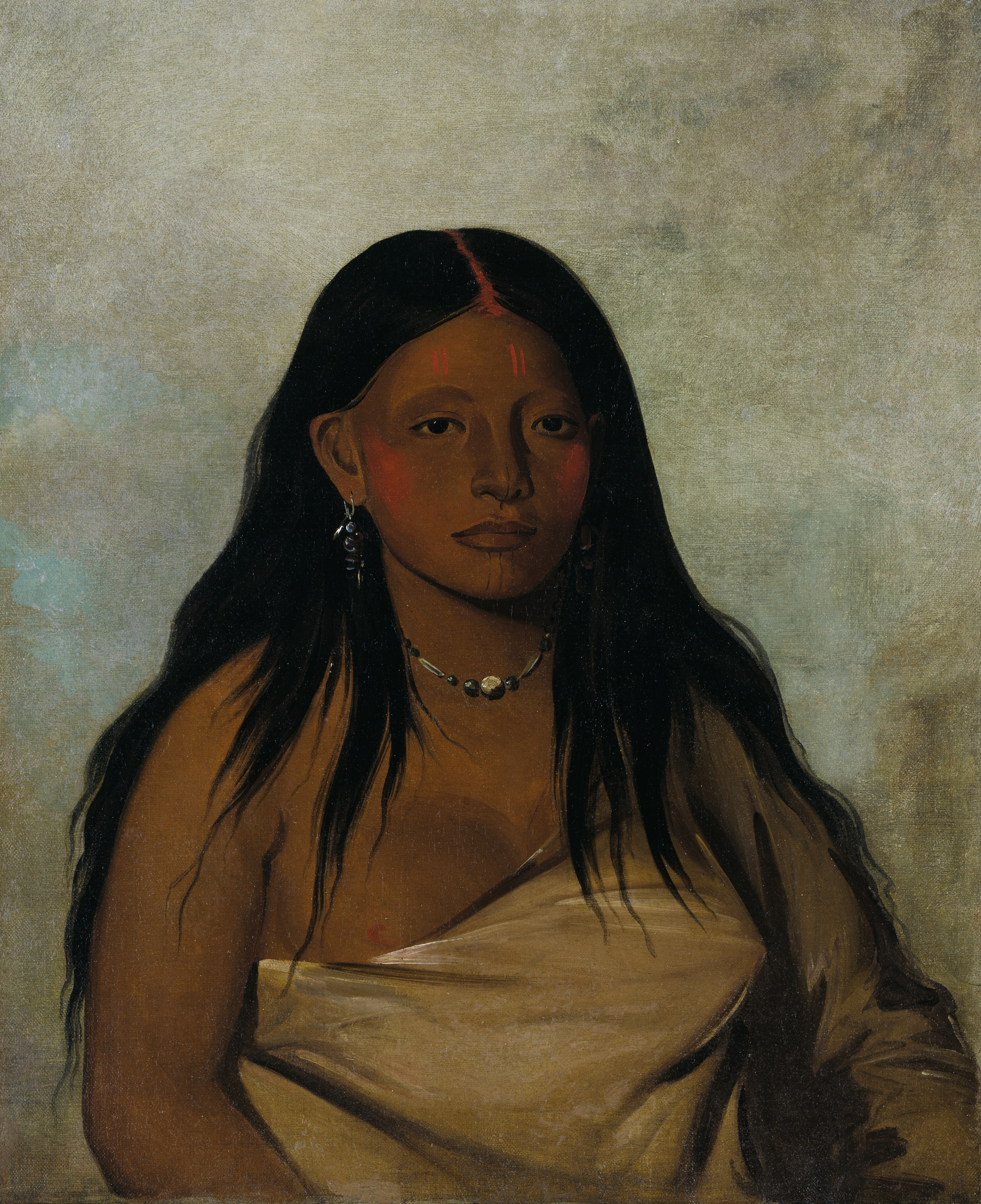
Shé-de-ah, Wild Sage, a Wichita Woman, 1834 (Smithsonian American Art Museum)

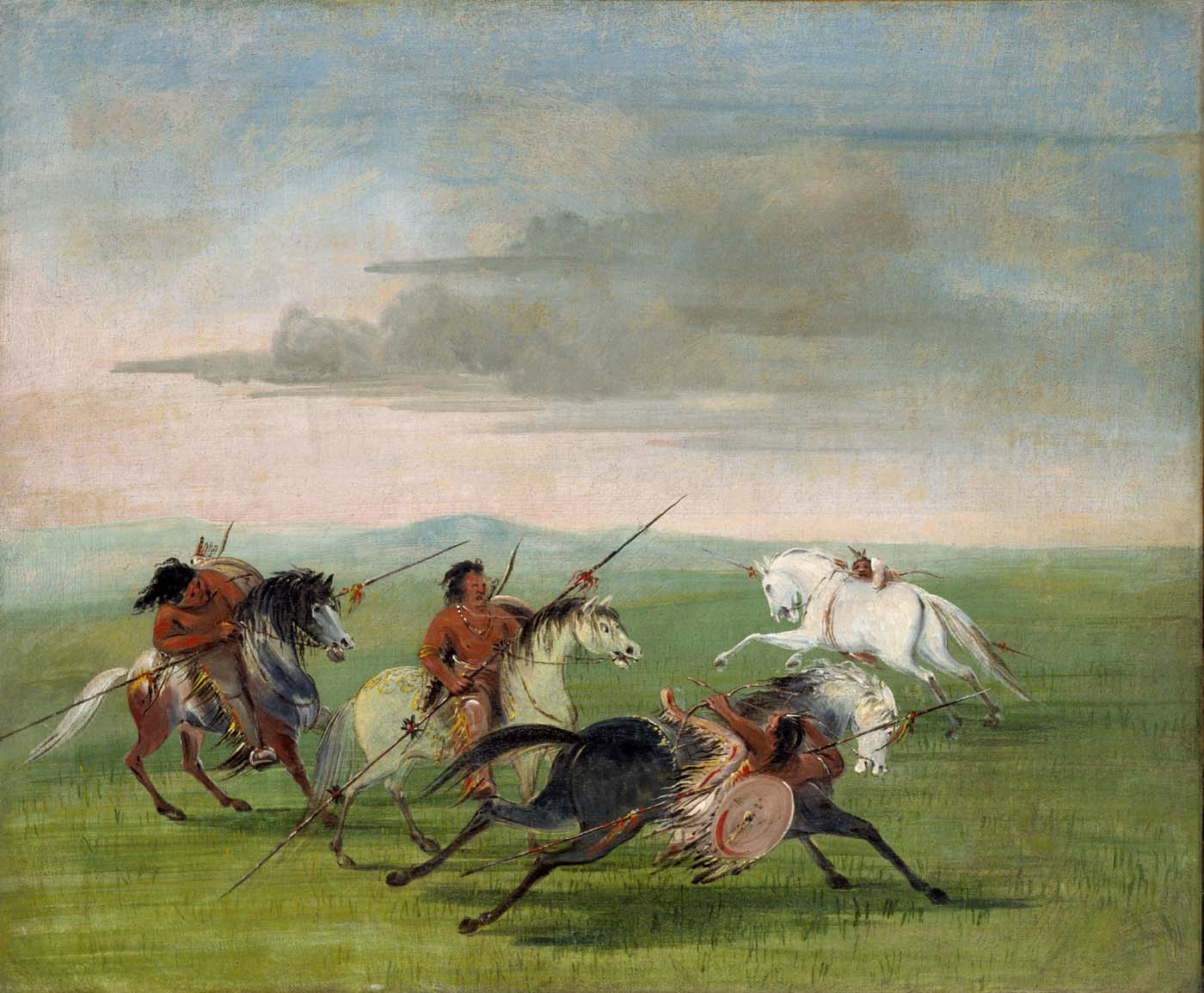
Comanche Feats of Horsemanship, 1834–35

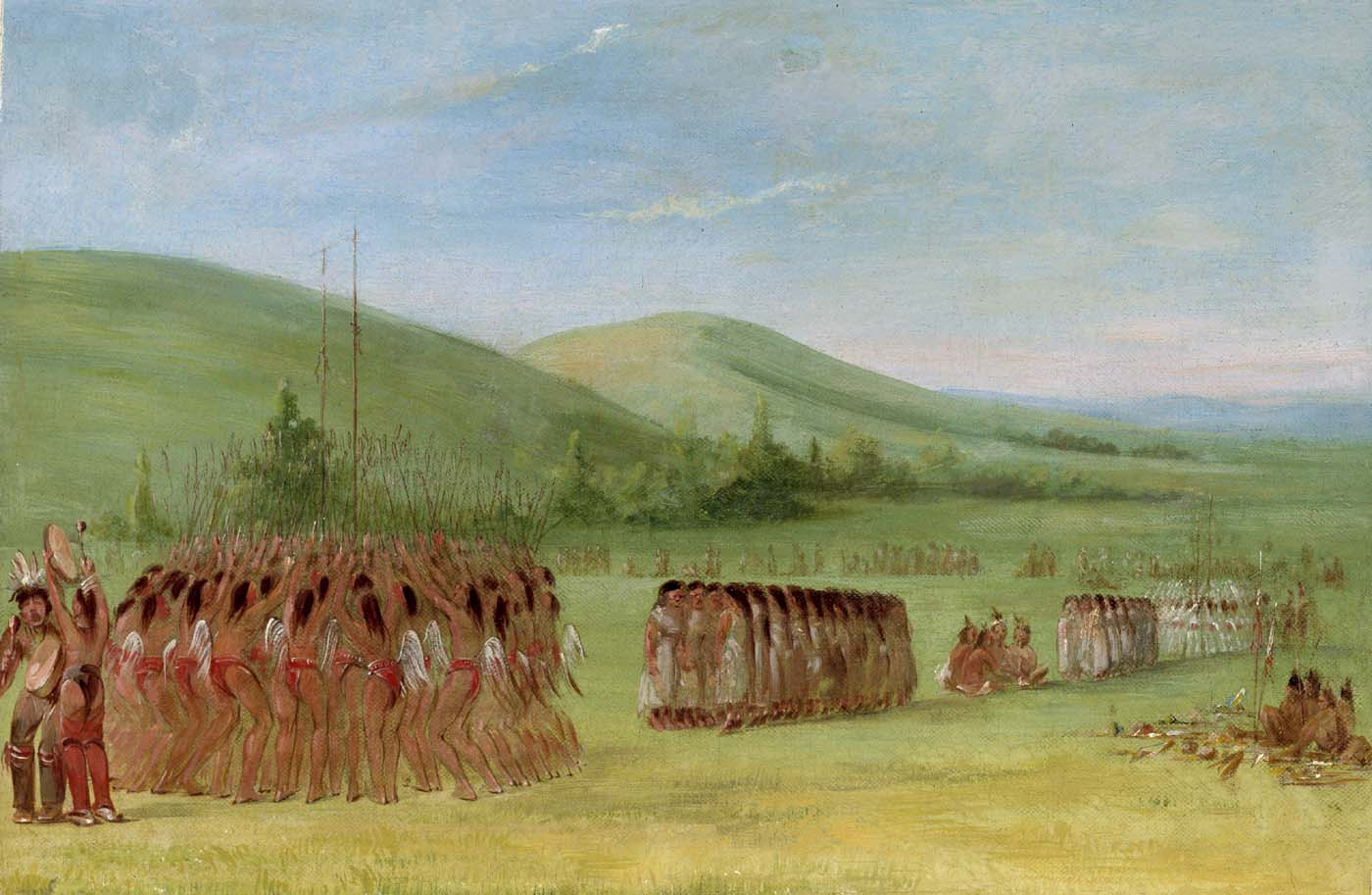
Ball-Play Dance, c. 1835 (Renwick Gallery, Washington D.C.)

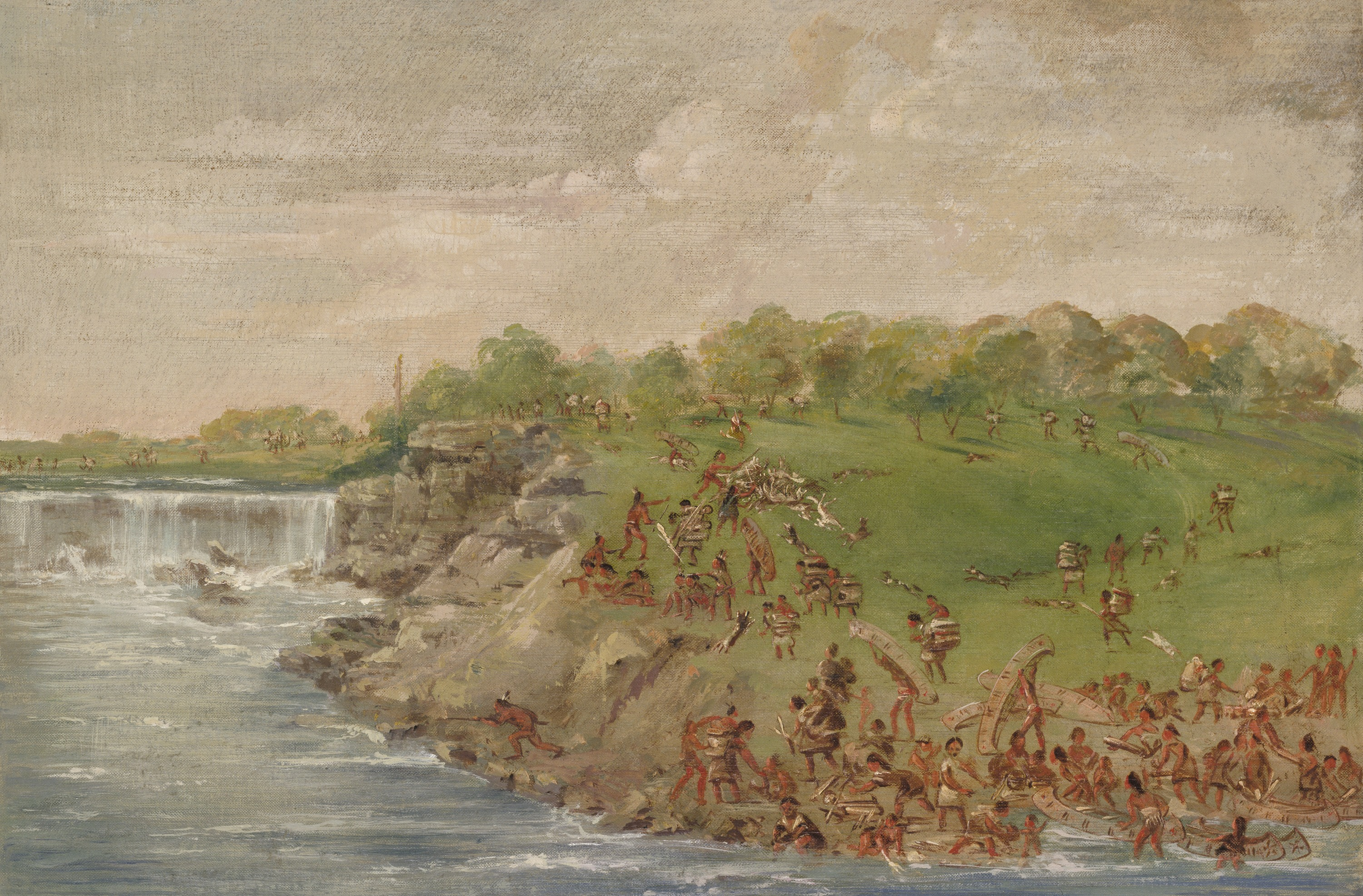
Ojibwa Portaging Around the Falls of St. Anthony, 1835–1836 (Smithsonian American Art Museum)

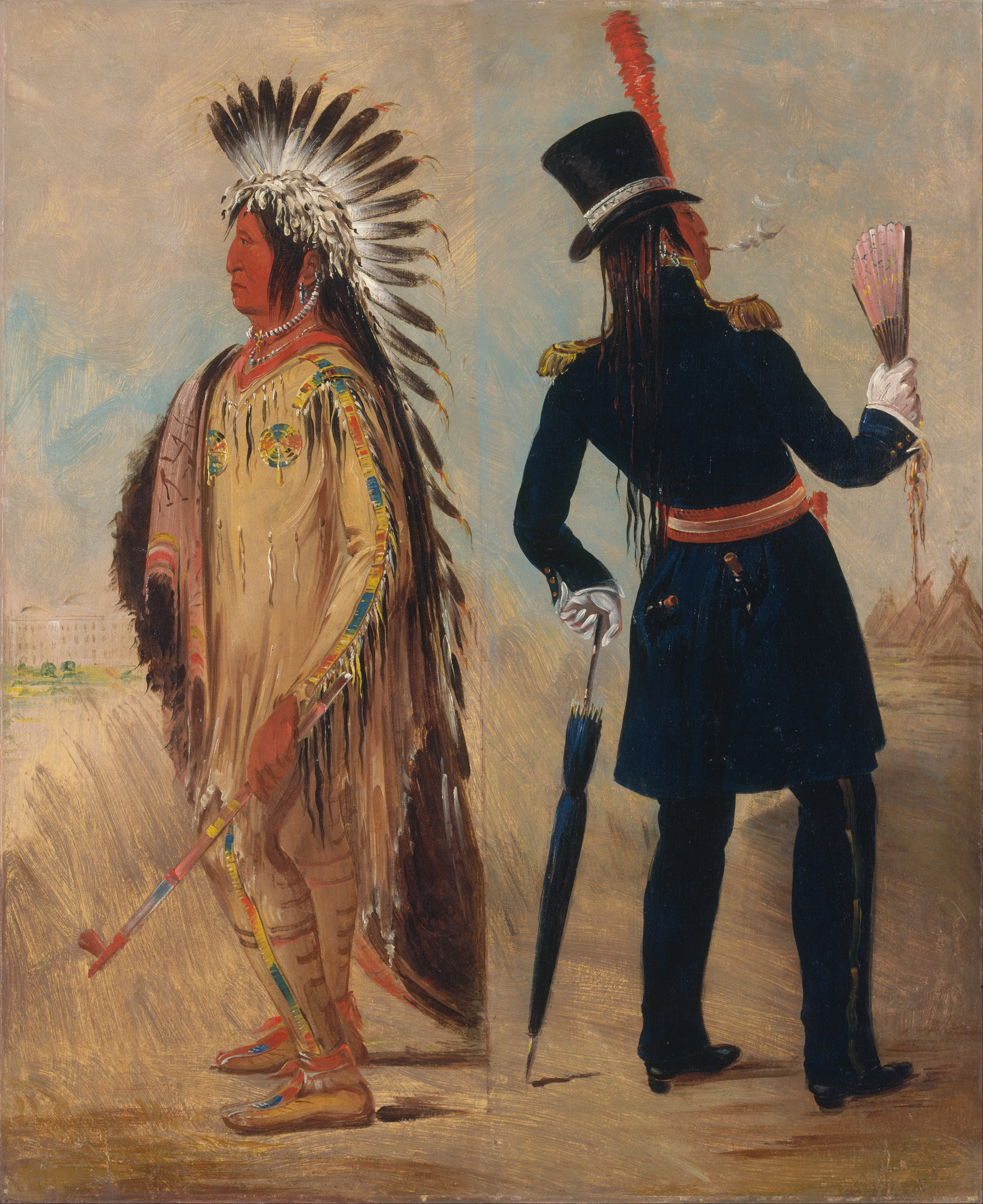
Wi-jún-jon, Pigeon's Egg Head (The Light), Going To and Returning From Washington, 1837–1839 (Smithsonian American Art Museum)

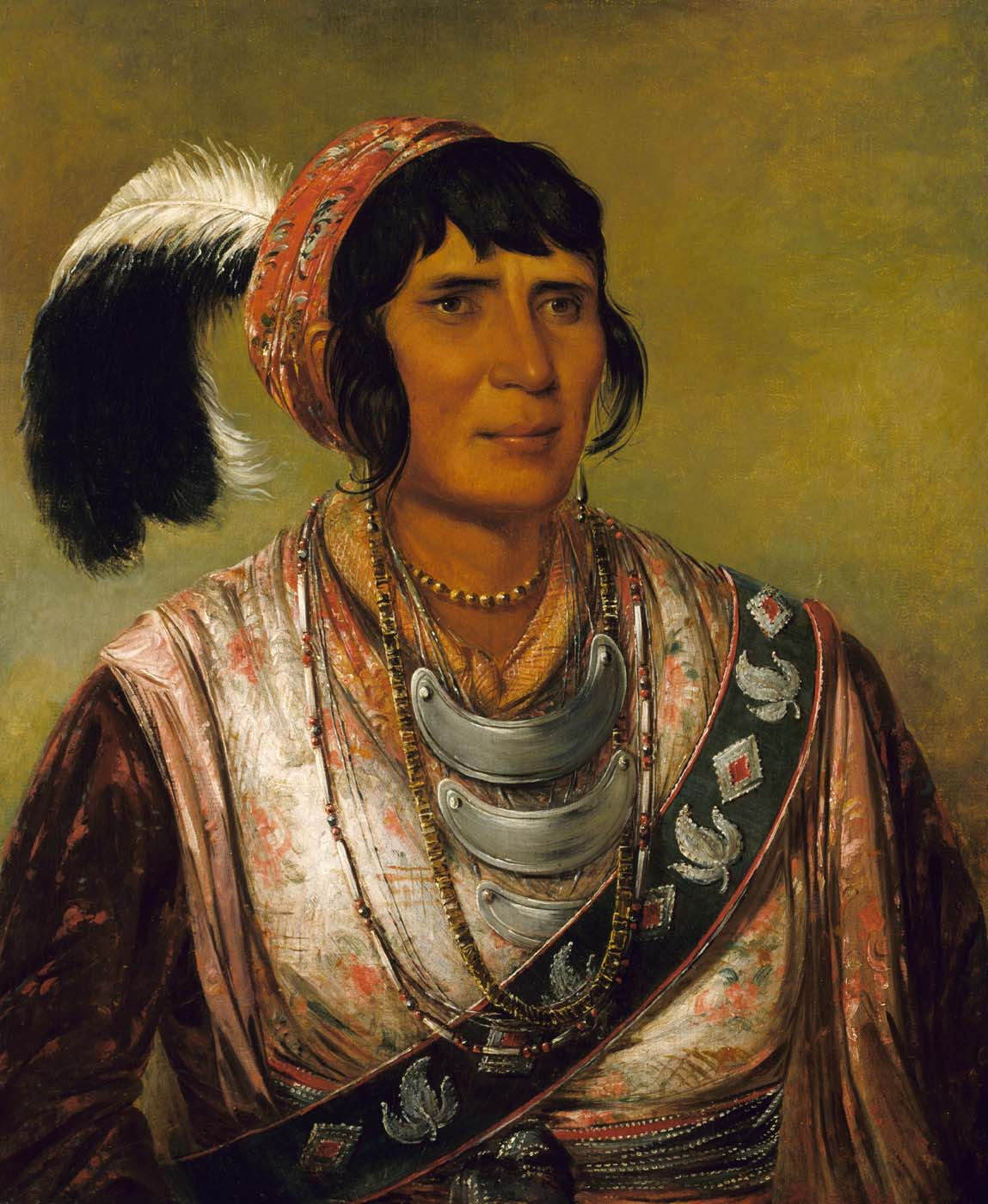
Os-ce-o-lá, The Black Drink, a Warrior of Great Distinction, 1838

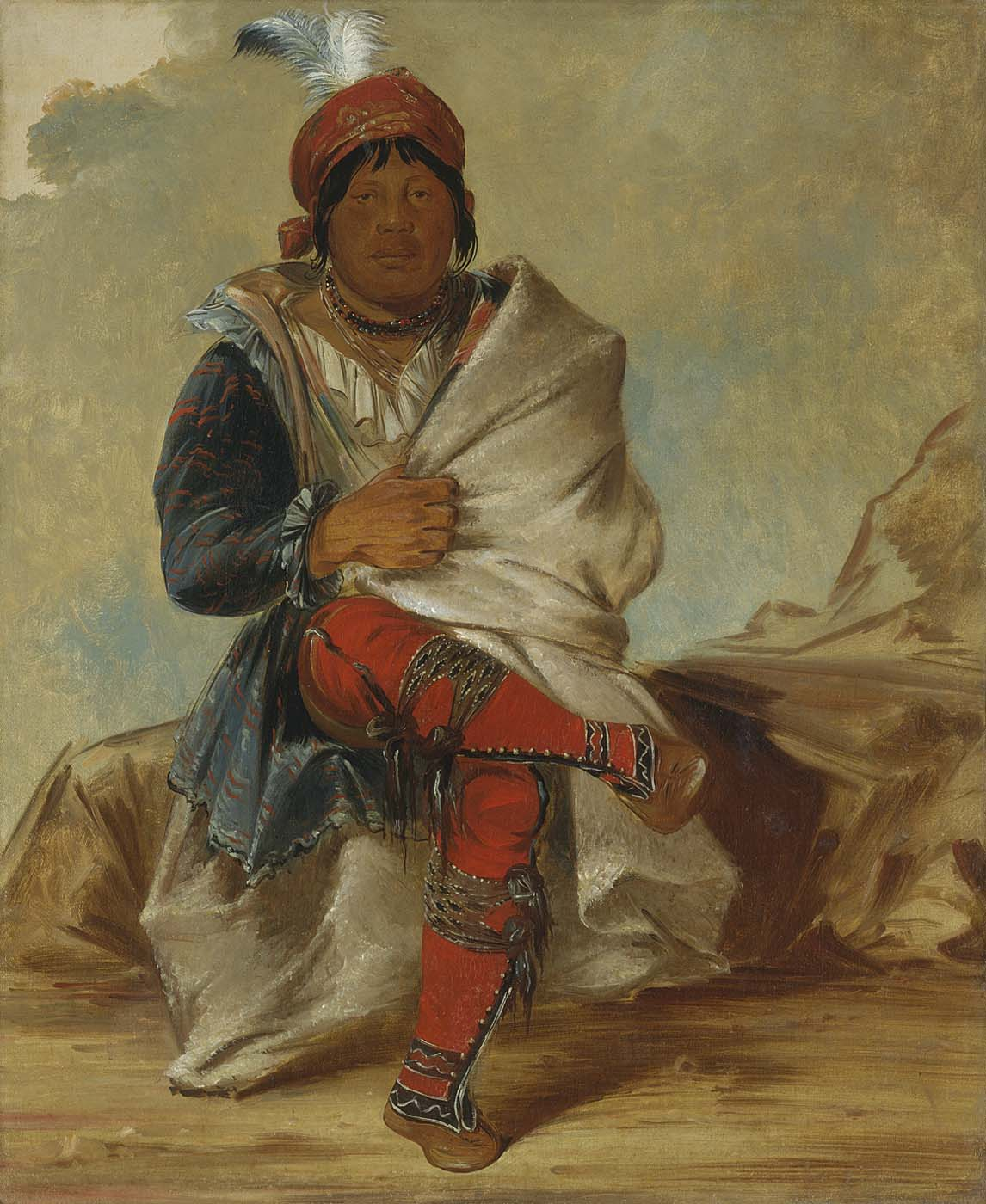
Mick-e-no-páh, Chief of the Tribe, 1838 (Smithsonian American Art Museum)

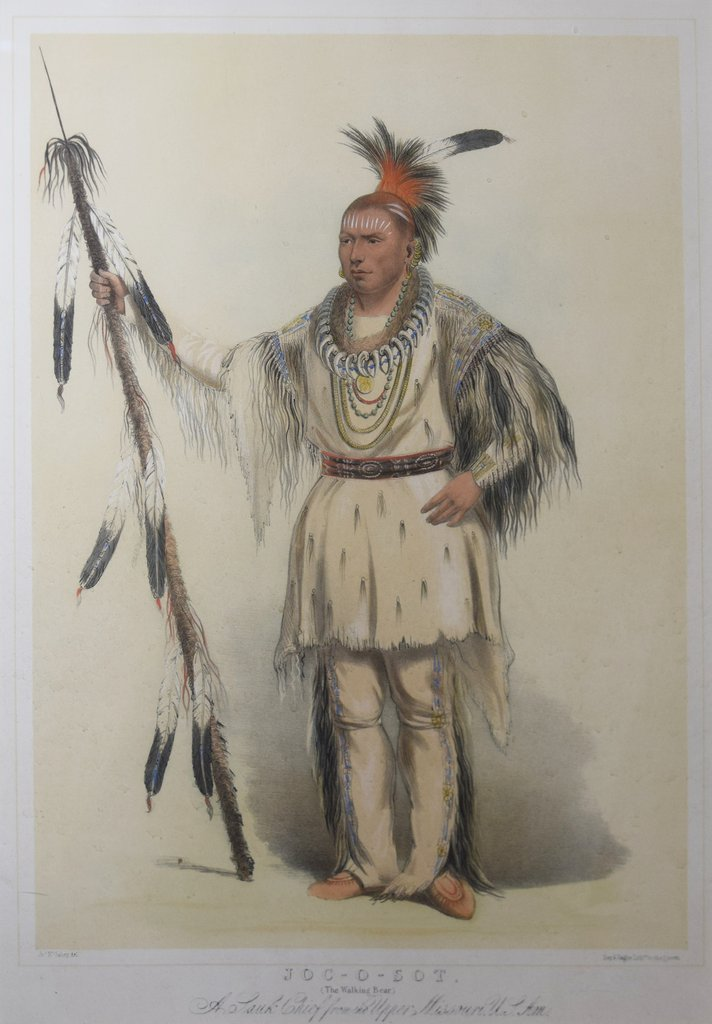
Joc-O-Sot, The Walking Bear, 1844 hand-colored lithograph by George Catlin

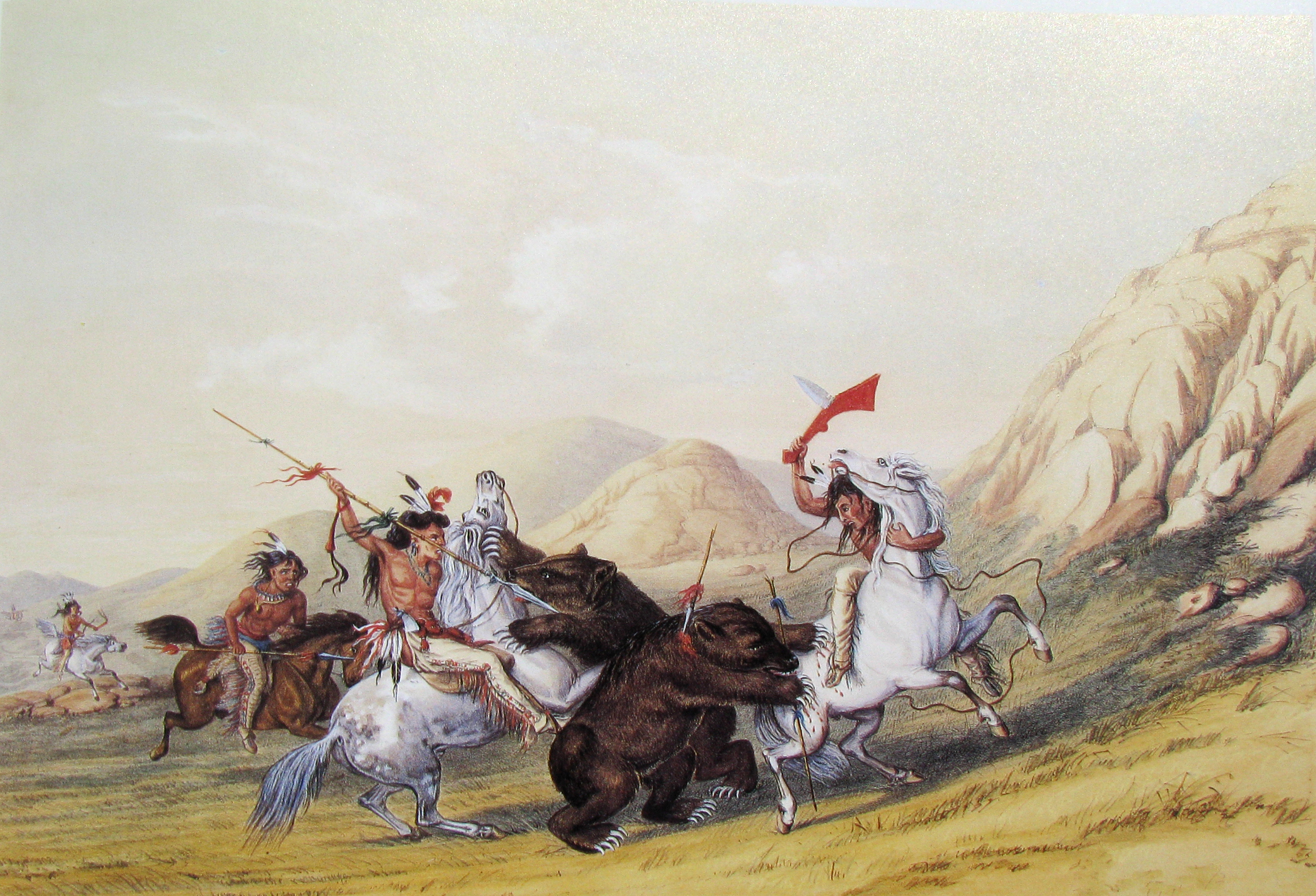
Attacking the Grizzly Bear, no. 19, 1844

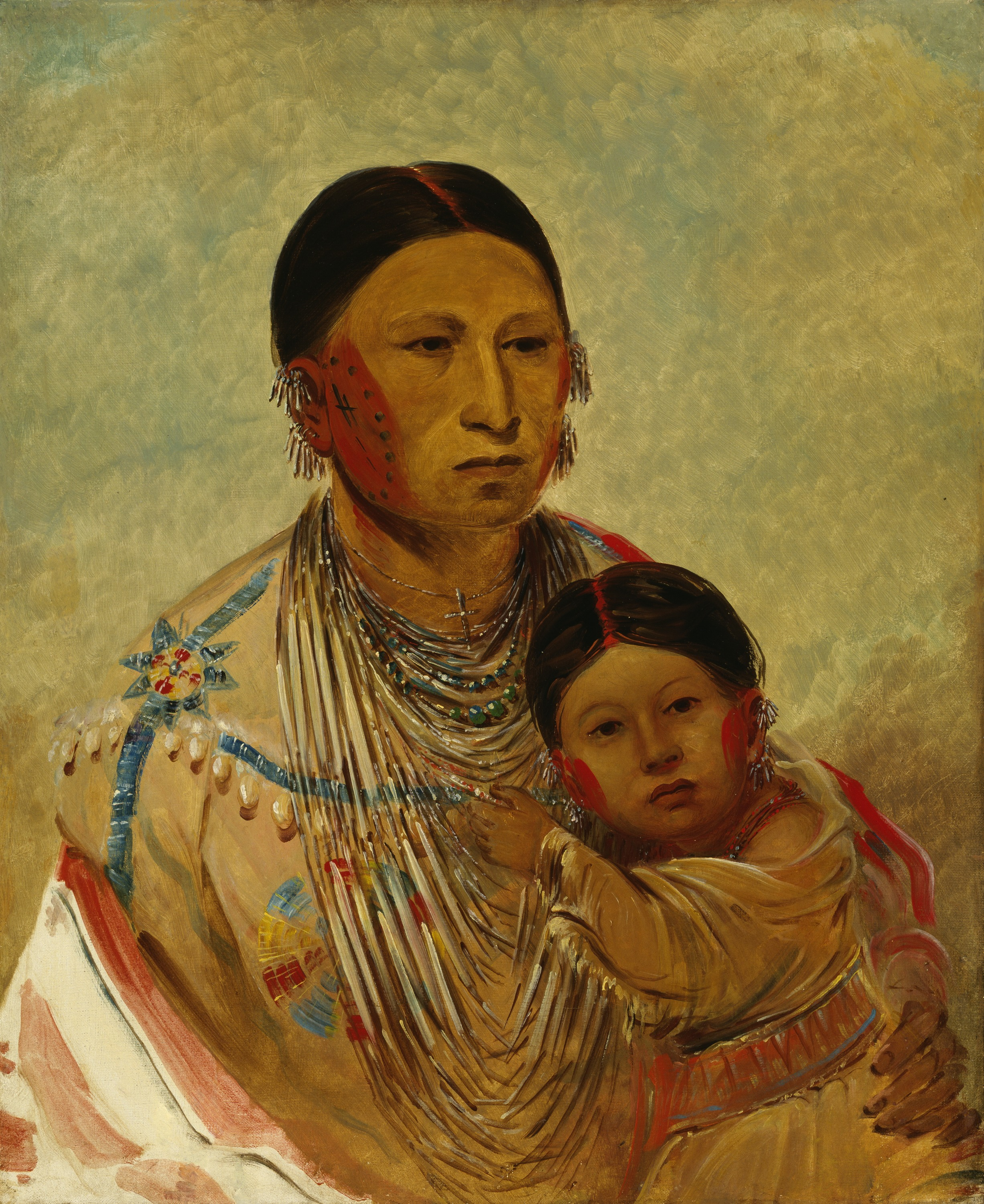
Ru-ton-ye-wee-ma, Strutting Pigeon, Wife of White Cloud, 1844 (Smithsonian American Art Museum)

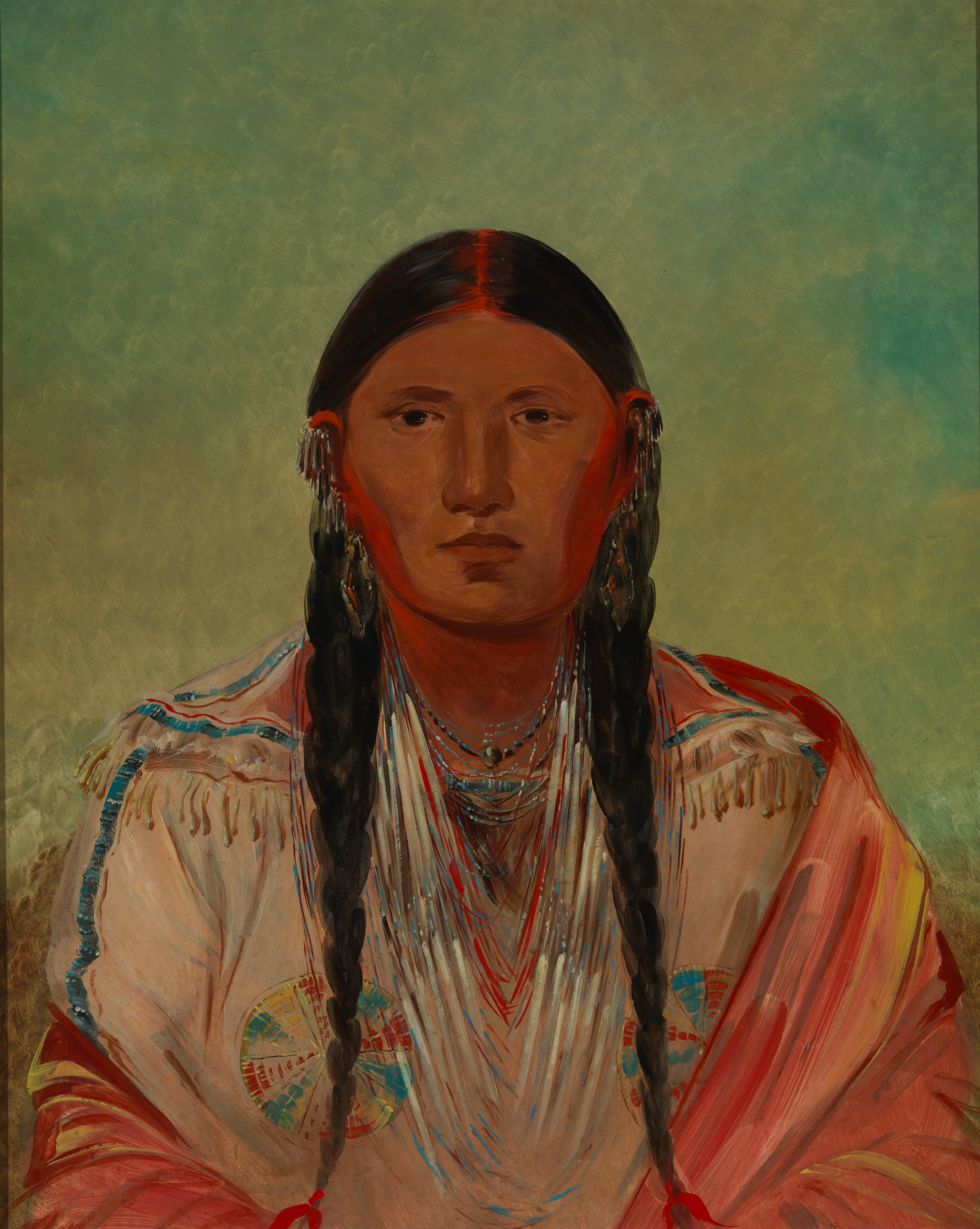
Ru-ton-wee-me, Pigeon on the Wing, 1844 (Smithsonian American Art Museum)

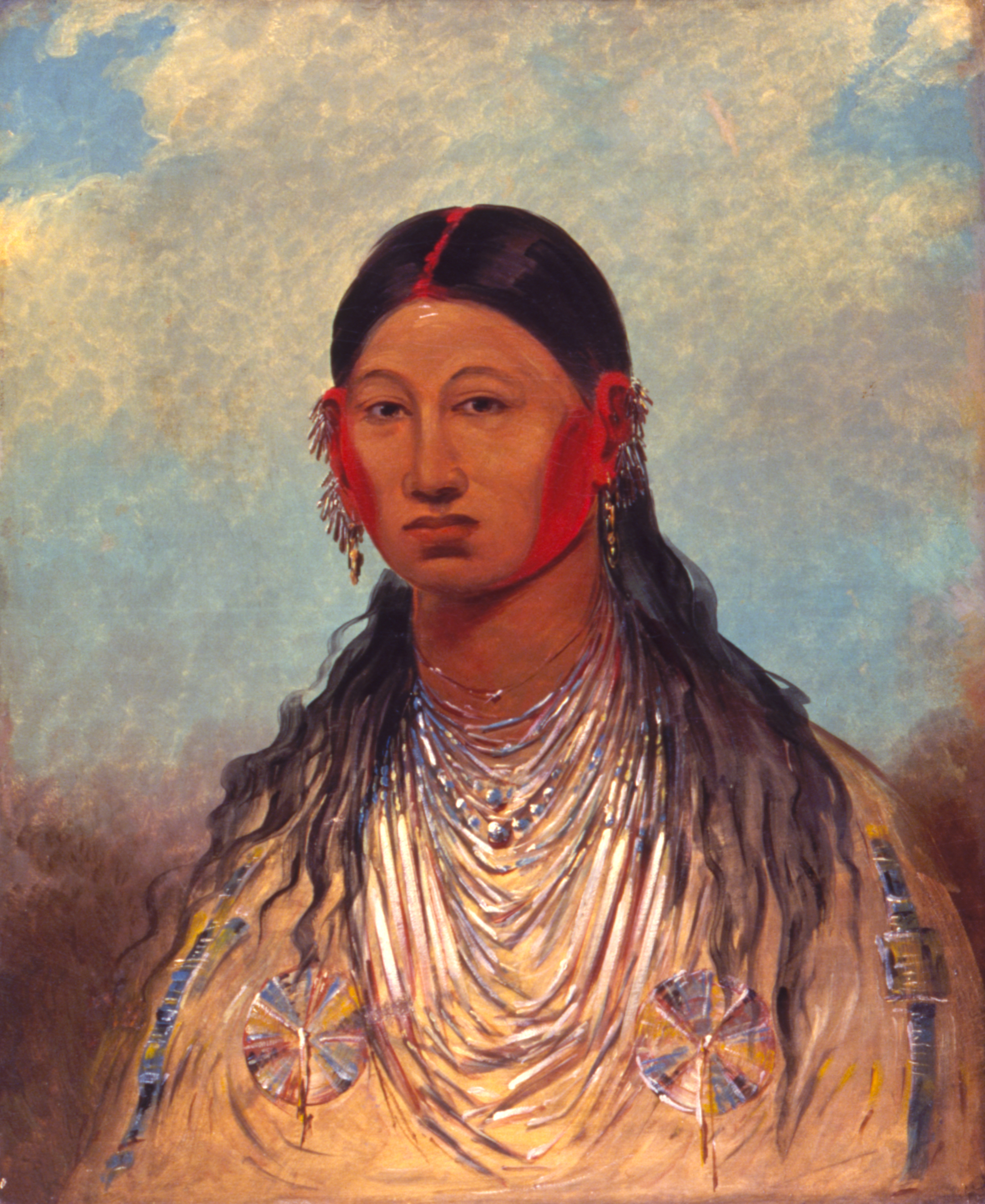
Koon-za-ya-me, Female War Eagle, 1844

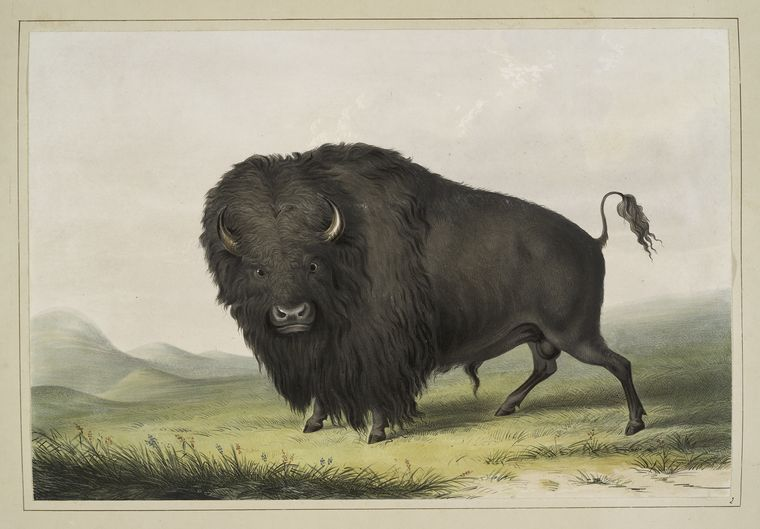
Buffalo Bull Grazing, lithograph, 1845

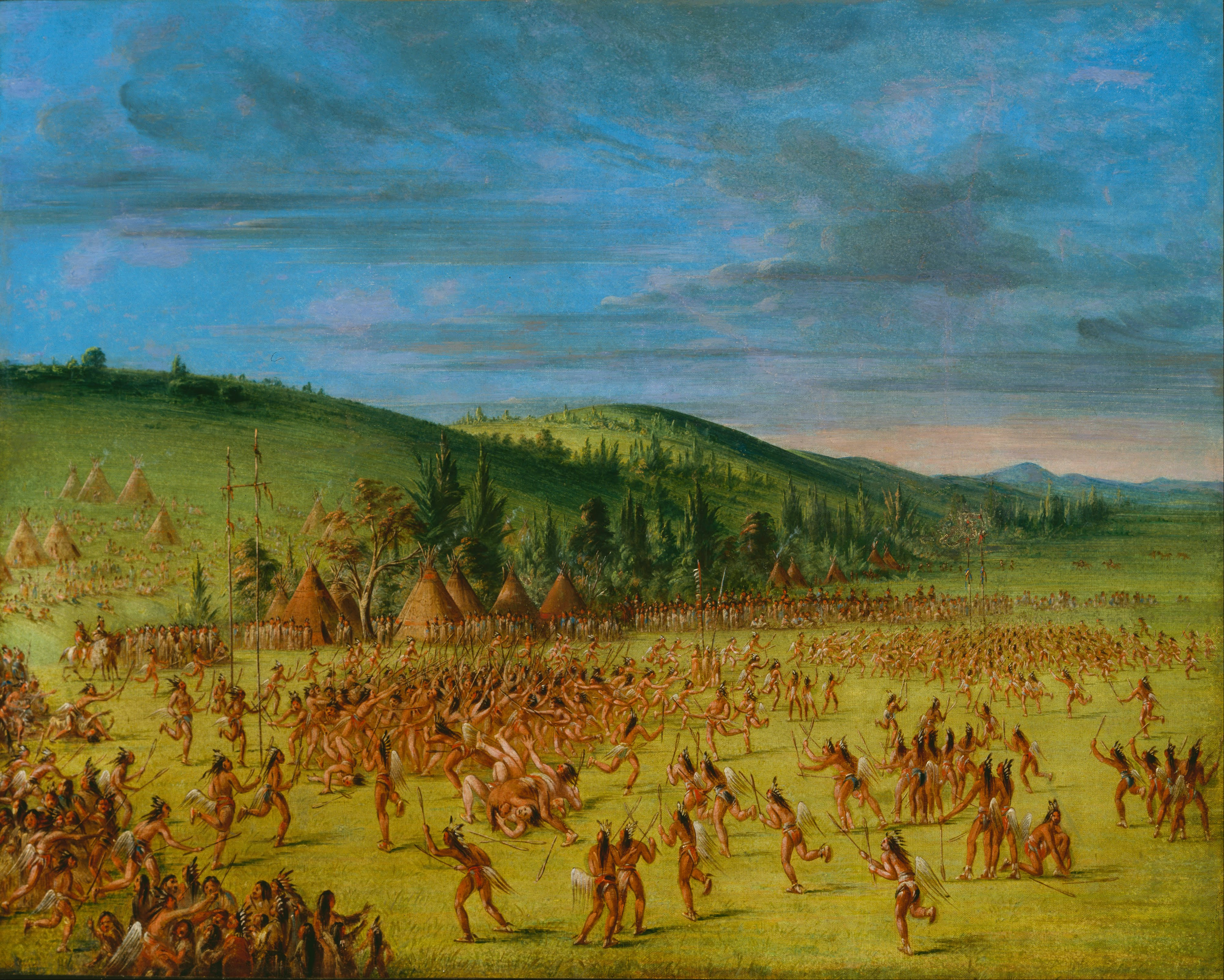
Ball-play of the Choctaw – Ball Up, 1846–1850 (Smithsonian American Art Museum)

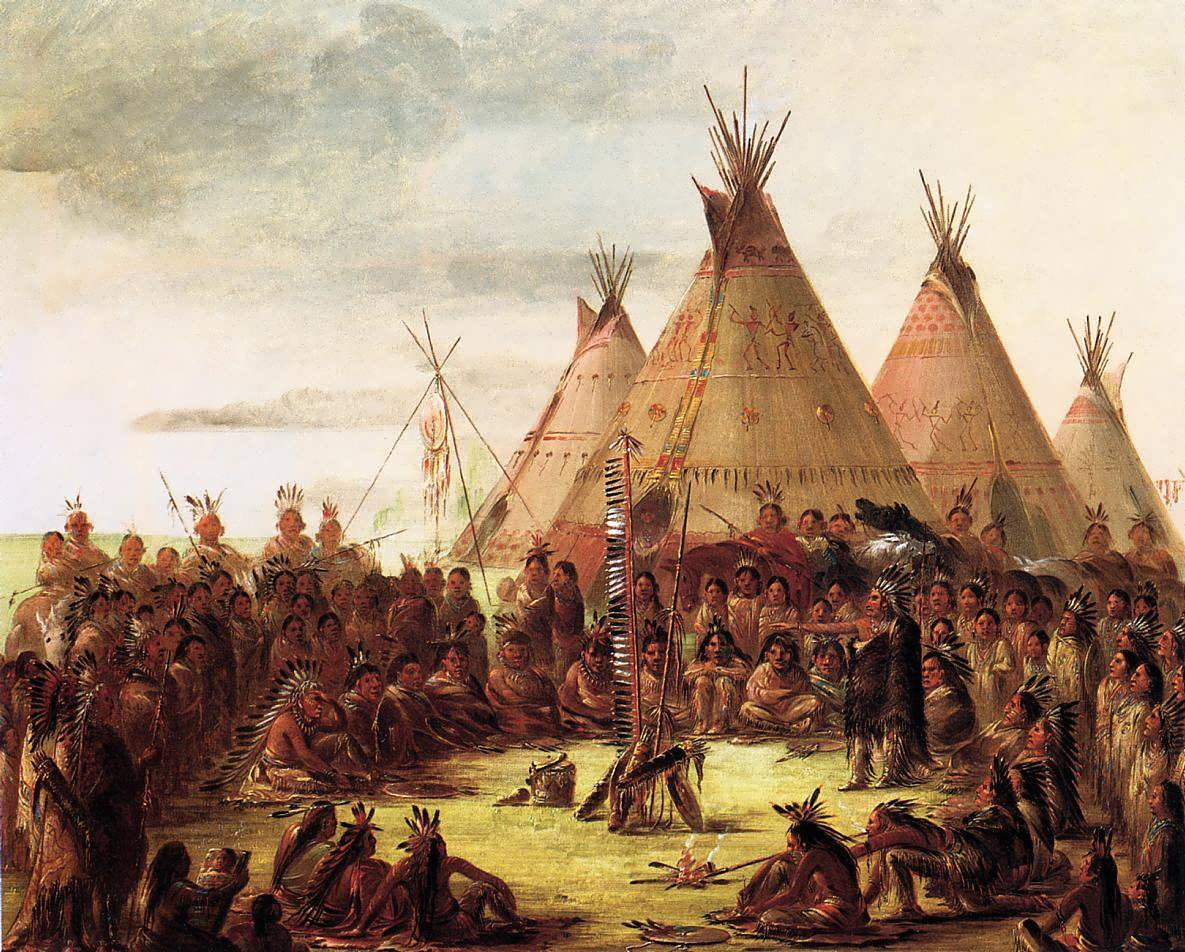
Tipis, c. 1850

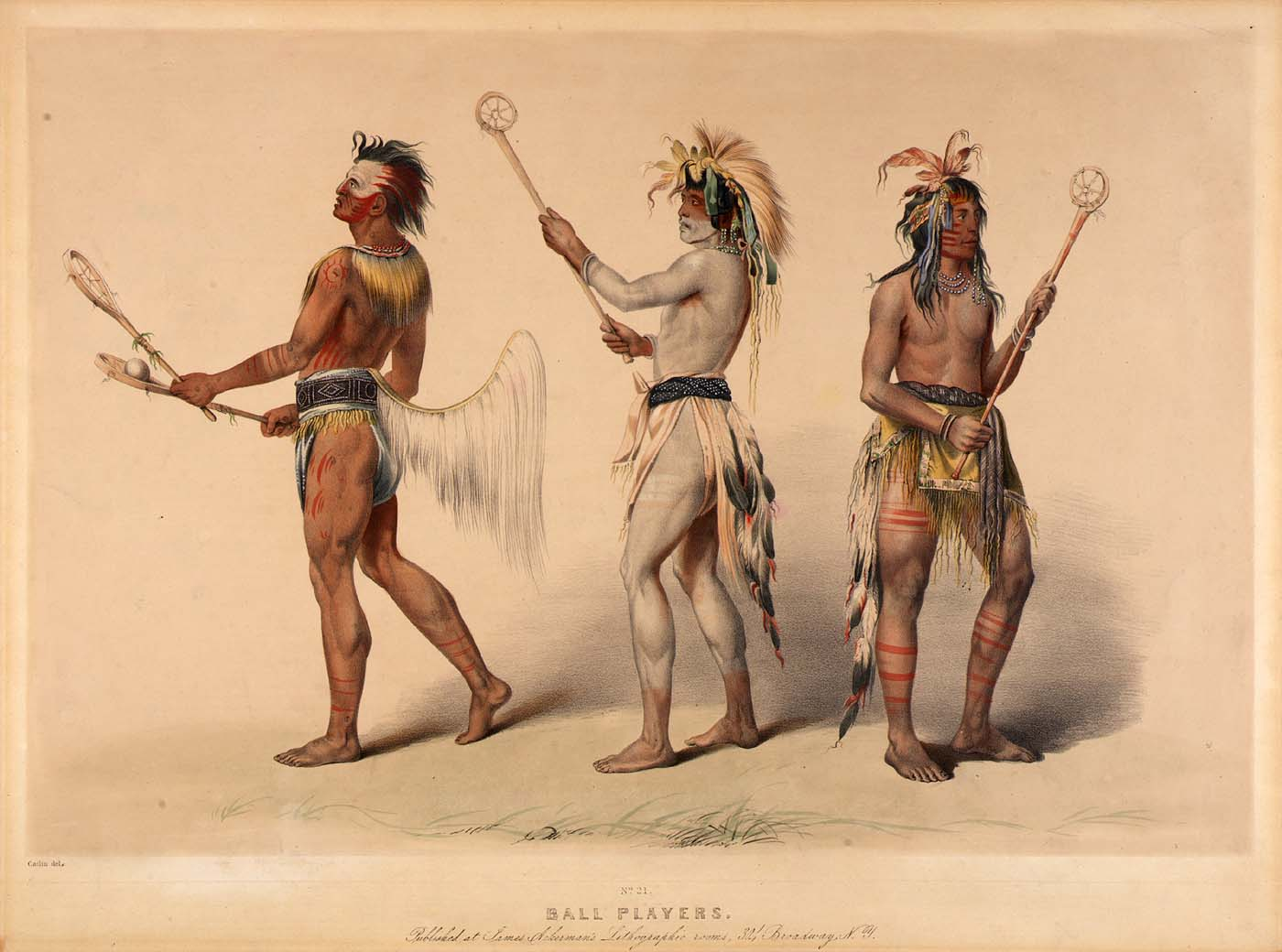
Ball players, hand-colored lithograph, unknown date

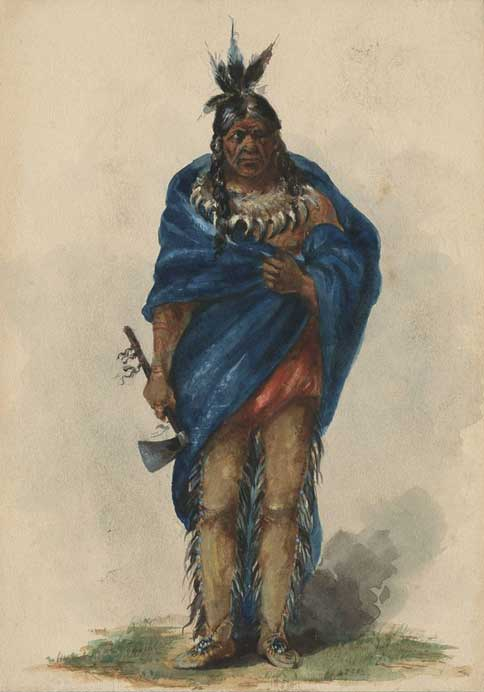
Portrait of Chief Comcomly, unknown date

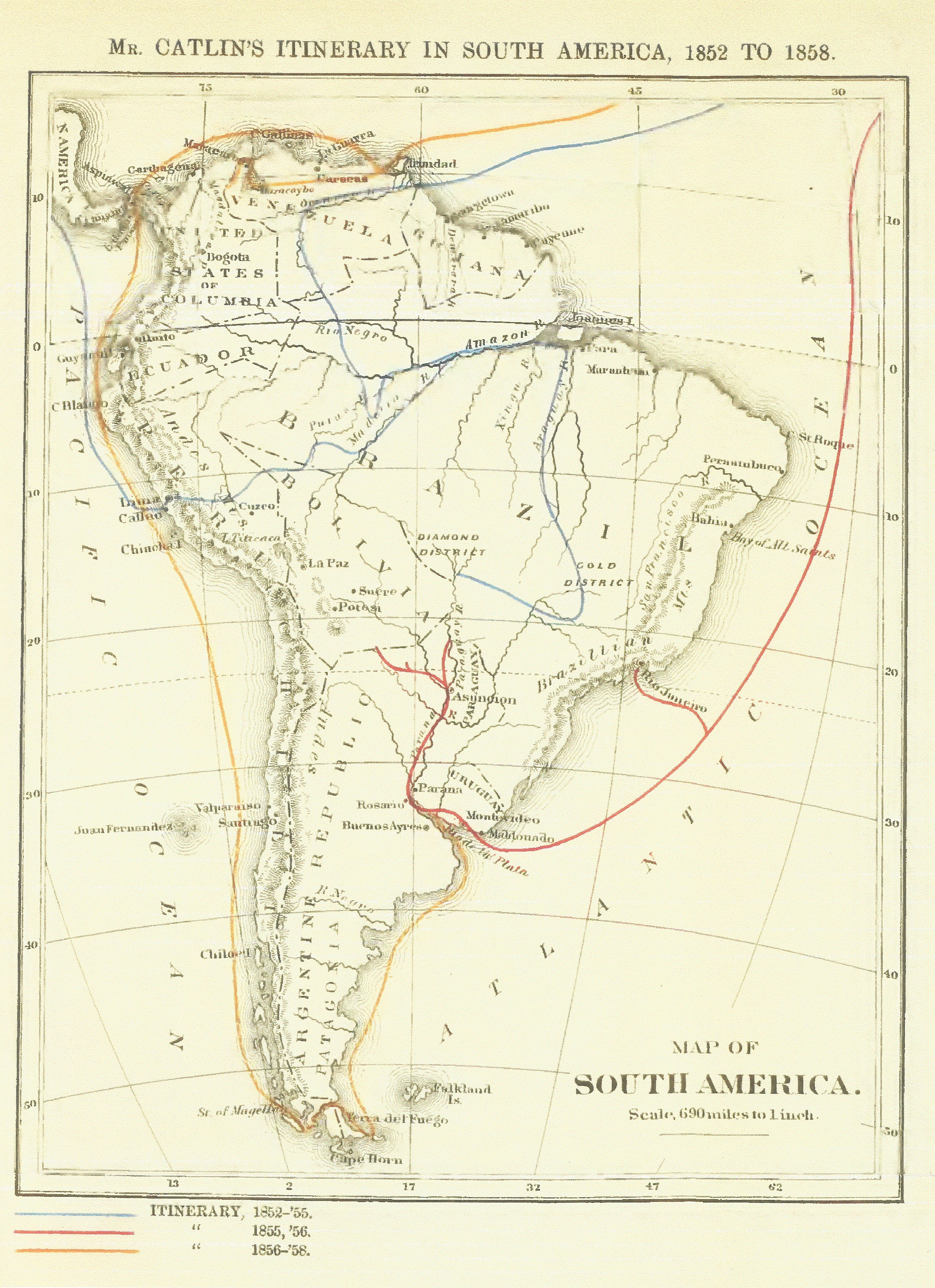
'Mr Catlin's itinerary in South America, 1852–1858'

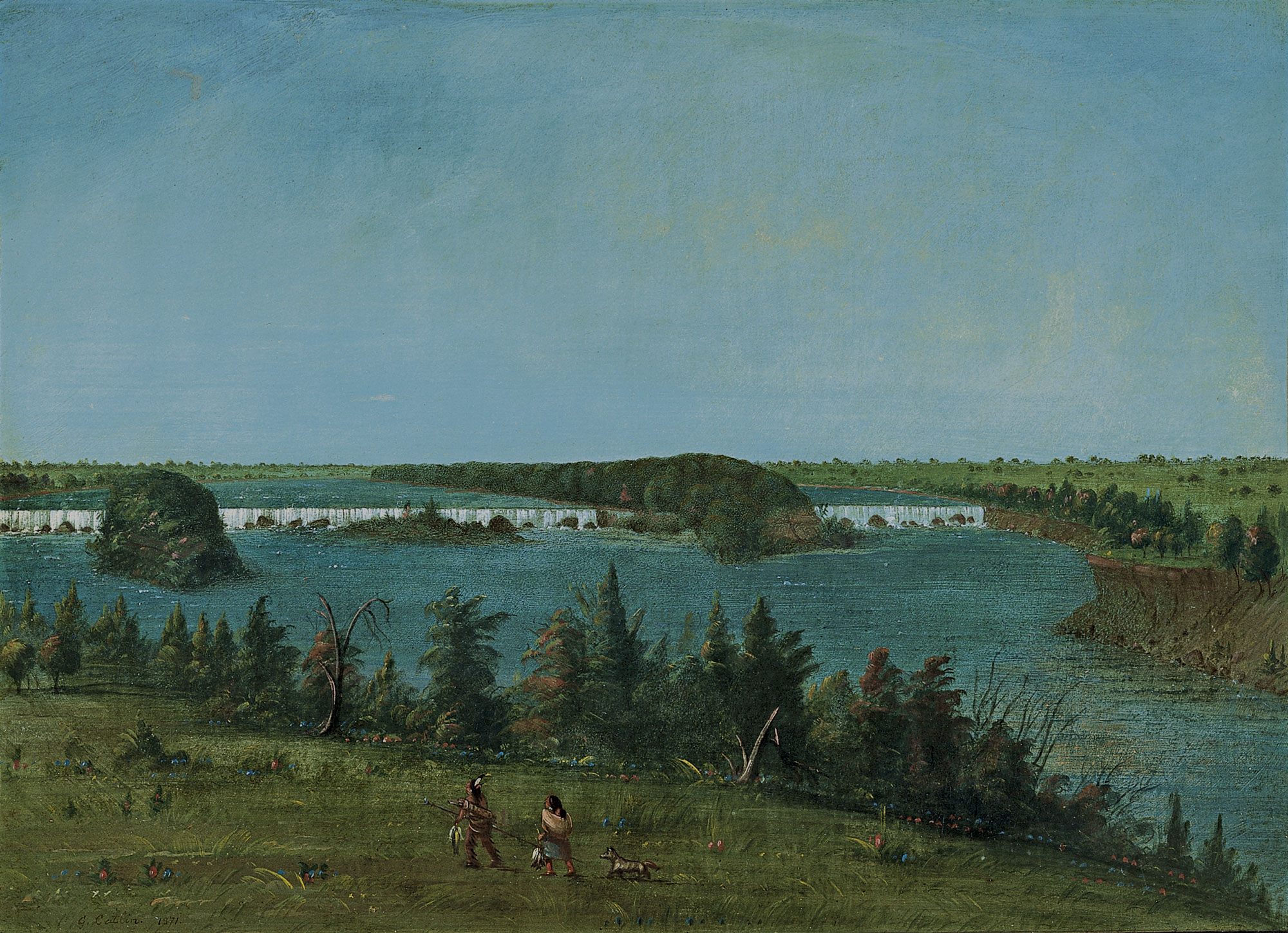
The Falls of Saint Anthony, 1871, Thyssen-Bornemisza Museum

== Works by Catlin ==
- Catlin, George (1834). Comanche Feats of Martial Horsemanship. Retrieved October 29, 2019.
- Catlin, George (1857). Letters and Notes on the Manners, Customs and Conditions of North American Indians: The Complete Volumes I and II: Illustrated. Willis P. Hazard.
- Catlin, George (1861). Life Among the Indians. London: Gall and Inglis.
- Catlin, George (1862). The Breath of Life (later retitled as Shut Your Mouth and Save Your Life).
- Catlin, George (1876). Illustrations of the manners, customs & condition of the North American Indians, Vol. 1. London: Chatto & Windus. ISBN 978-1543245981.
- Catlin, George (1876). Illustrations of the manners, customs & condition of the North American Indians, Vol. 2. London: Chatto & Windus. ISBN 978-1543246858.

== See also ==
- Catlin Hall, Wilkes College
- Chief Mahaska
- Mato-tope
- Benjamin O'Fallon § Collector, a friend, patron and collector of Catlin's work

== General and cited bibliography ==
=== Books ===
- Conn, Steven (2004). History's Shadow: Native Americans and Historical Consciousness in the Nineteenth Century. University of Chicago Press. ISBN 0-226-11494-5.
- Dippe, Brian; Mulvey, Christopher; Carpenter Troccoli, Joan; Heyman, Therese Thau (2002). George Catlin and His Indian Gallery. Smithsonian American Art Museum and W. W. Norton & Company. ISBN 0-393-05217-6.
- Eisler, Benita (2013). The Red Man's Bones: George Catlin, Artist and Showman. W. W. Norton & Company. ISBN 978-0-393-06616-6.
- Nestor, James (2020). Breath: The New Science of a Lost Art. Riverhead Books. ISBN 978-0735213616.
- Reich, Susanna (2008). Painting the Wild Frontier: The Art and Adventures of George Catlin. Clarion Books. ISBN 978-0-618-71470-4.
- Vaughn, William (2000). Encyclopedia of Artists. Oxford University Press. ISBN 0-19-521572-9.

=== Articles ===
- George Catlin on Mouth Breathing at PubMed

=== Documents ===
- George Catlin papers and illustrations at The Huntington Library
- George Catlin letters, 1827–1870 at The Consortium of Academic and Research Libraries in Illinois
- Guide to the George Catlin Papers at University of Kansas
- George Catlin papers, 1821–1904 at The Smithsonian Institution
