= Martial Feats of Comanche Horsemanship =

- Watchmen episode
- Episode no.: Episode 2
- Directed by: Nicole Kassell
- Written by: Damon Lindelof; Nick Cuse
- Cinematography by: Gregory Middleton
- Editing by: Henk Van Eeghen
- Production code: 102
- Original air date: October 27, 2019
- Running time: 53 minutes

Guest appearances
- Don Johnson as Judd Crawford; Frances Fisher as Jane Crawford; James Wolk as Joe Keene; Jim Beaver as Andy; Robert Ray Wisdom as Seymour; Cheyenne Jackson as Hooded Justice; Lily Rose Smith as Rosie; Adelynn Spoon as Emma; Jolie Hoang-Rappaport as Bian

Episode chronology
← Previous "It's Summer and We're Running Out of Ice"	Next → "She Was Killed by Space Junk"

"Martial Feats of Comanche Horsemanship" is the second episode of the HBO superhero drama miniseries Watchmen, based on the 1986 DC Comics series of the same name by Alan Moore and Dave Gibbons. The episode was written by Damon Lindelof and Nick Cuse and directed by Nicole Kassell, and aired on October 27, 2019.

== Synopsis ==
In World War I, O.B. Williams is a soldier in one of America's all-black units. As they march, a German plane flies overhead and drops propaganda leaflets, trying to convince the black troops to join the German forces in light of the racial injustice in the United States. O.B. pockets one.

In the present, Angela mourns over Judd's death, where it is shown they had become close friends after the events of "White Night" on Christmas Eve 2016, where 40 Tulsa officers and their families were targeted by the Seventh Kavalry. Of those that survived, only Angela and Judd remained with the force, requiring the state to pass a law requiring law enforcement to protect their identities to recruit new members.

Angela takes the old man in the wheelchair to her bakery to interrogate him. He identifies himself as Will and claims to be Angela's grandfather, but she remains dubious. She secretly collects some of his DNA to process at a local heritage center, which confirm Will's claim. She returns to Will, who claims that Judd has "skeletons in his closet" to be found.

Angela attends Judd's wake at his home. She feigns illness to quietly slip into his bedroom and discovers a secret room in the back of his closet, which inside includes a Ku Klux Klan outfit with a sheriff's badge. Returning to Will after the wake, Angela demands to know how he knew of Judd's closet, but Will remains quiet. She prepares to take Will to the police station to be arrested, but after loading Will into her car, a giant electromagnet clamps onto the car's roof and takes it away. A slip of paper falls to Angela's feet: the piece of German propaganda on which O.B. had written "Watch over this boy" before sending a young Will away from the 1921 Tulsa race massacre.

In the country manor, the Blonde Man watches his play The Watchmaker's Son being performed by Mr. Phillips and Ms. Crookshanks and other masked crew. The scene reenacts Jonathan Osterman's transformation into Doctor Manhattan. However, while Phillips is in the mock test chamber, the Blonde Man activates an incinerator within it, burning Phillips alive. The scene continues, revealing that the other actors and crew are clones of Phillips and Crookshanks. The Blonde Man instructs a Phillips clone to take the burned body to the cellar.

== Production ==
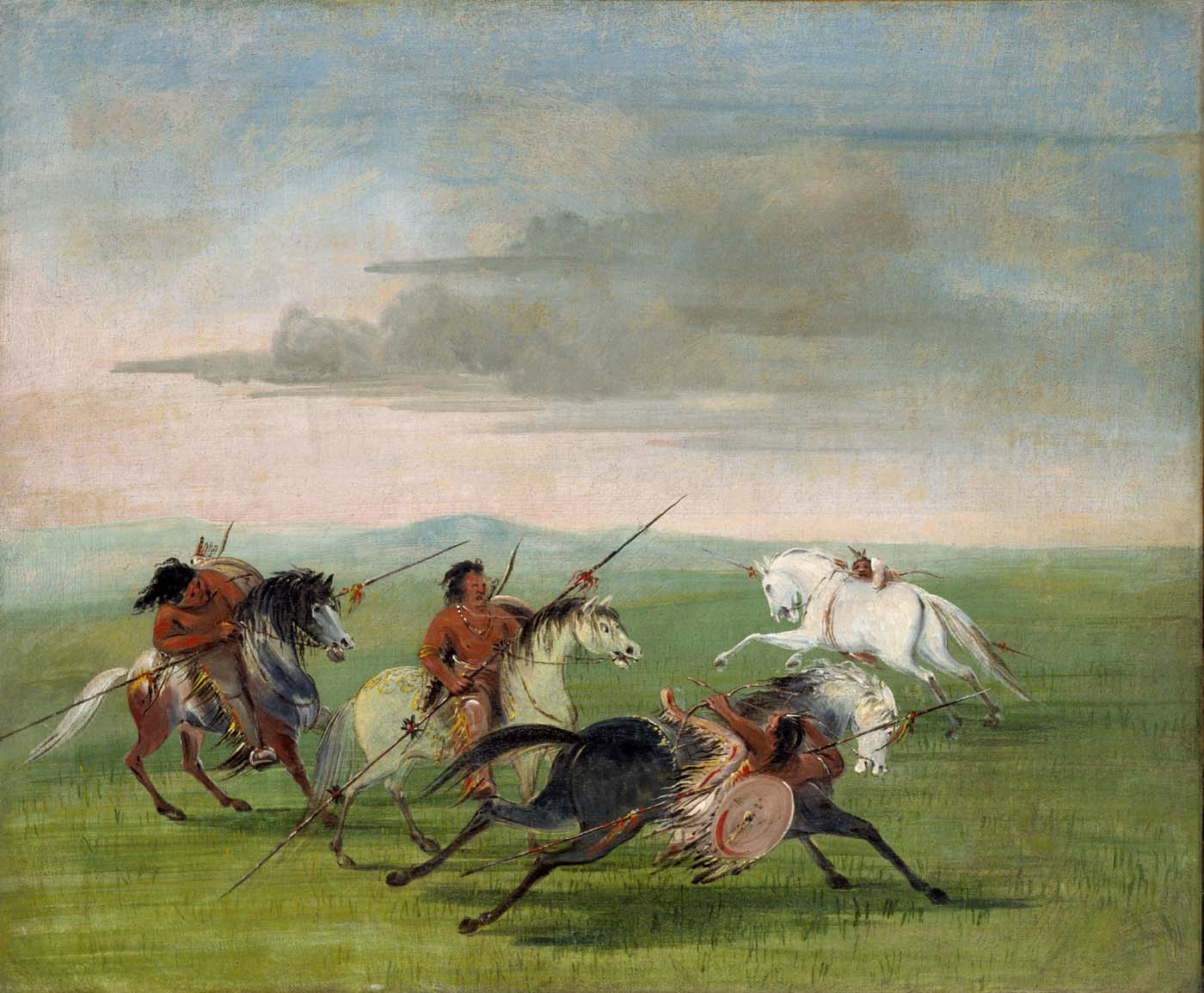
The episode's title is a play on the title of Comanche Feats of Horsemanship by George Catlin.

Nicole Kassell directed this episode. She had also directed the show's pilot, which had been filmed and produced as a pickup evaluation for HBO prior to the season being given the greenlight. Because this episode and rest of the season used a different crew from the pilot, Kassell felt it was important that she direct it as well to help provide the necessary continuity of production between the two episodes.

The episode's title is a play on the title of Comanche Feats of Horsemanship, a painting by George Catlin, which is shown hanging in Judd's mansion during the episode. Like many of Catlin's works, the painting is seen in the 21st century as intrusive of the native American culture and to be carrying a colonialist tone with it. This has led some to consider the painting's inclusion to be a hint towards the revelation of the KKK outfit in Judd's closet.

The episode includes a full-frontal nude shot of one of the Phillips clones playing Doctor Manhattan, who was frequently shown nude in the limited series comic as well as with the film adaption. A body double was used for this shot instead of actor Tom Mison who plays Phillips. Showrunner Damon Lindelof said that he had expected to show a fully nude Doctor Manhattan at some point during the series. He said that the showing of Doctor Manhattan's blue penis was an iconic part of the limited series and film, and said that when his friends and associates heard he got the showrunner role, they had all asked him "Are we going to see a blue penis?" However, Lindelof considered to himself "Was there a way to do this with some degree of absurdity and comedy, while at the same time acknowledging the source material?", and came onto the idea of using the fictional play, The Watchmaker's Son, as an appropriate vehicle for this shot. The play itself was designed to be like a high-school play similar to the one in Rushmore, but using directing elements similar to a Wes Anderson film. According to Mison, he and Sara Vickers who plays Ms. Crookshanks purposely acted poorly for their on-stage roles in the play to keep up the element of poor quality.

== Reception ==
=== Critical ===
At Rotten Tomatoes, the aggregate score for the episode is 7.4/10 from 34 reviews with a 95% rating. Its summary of the critical consensus is "Damon Lindelof and his team refuse to hold back as they continue to subvert expectations in the absolutely confounding, but positively riveting "Martial Feats of Comanche Horsemanship."

=== Ratings ===
An estimated 765,000 viewers watched "Martial Feats of Comanche Horesmanship" on its first broadcast night.
