= Comanche Feats of Horsemanship =

1834–35 painting by George Catlin

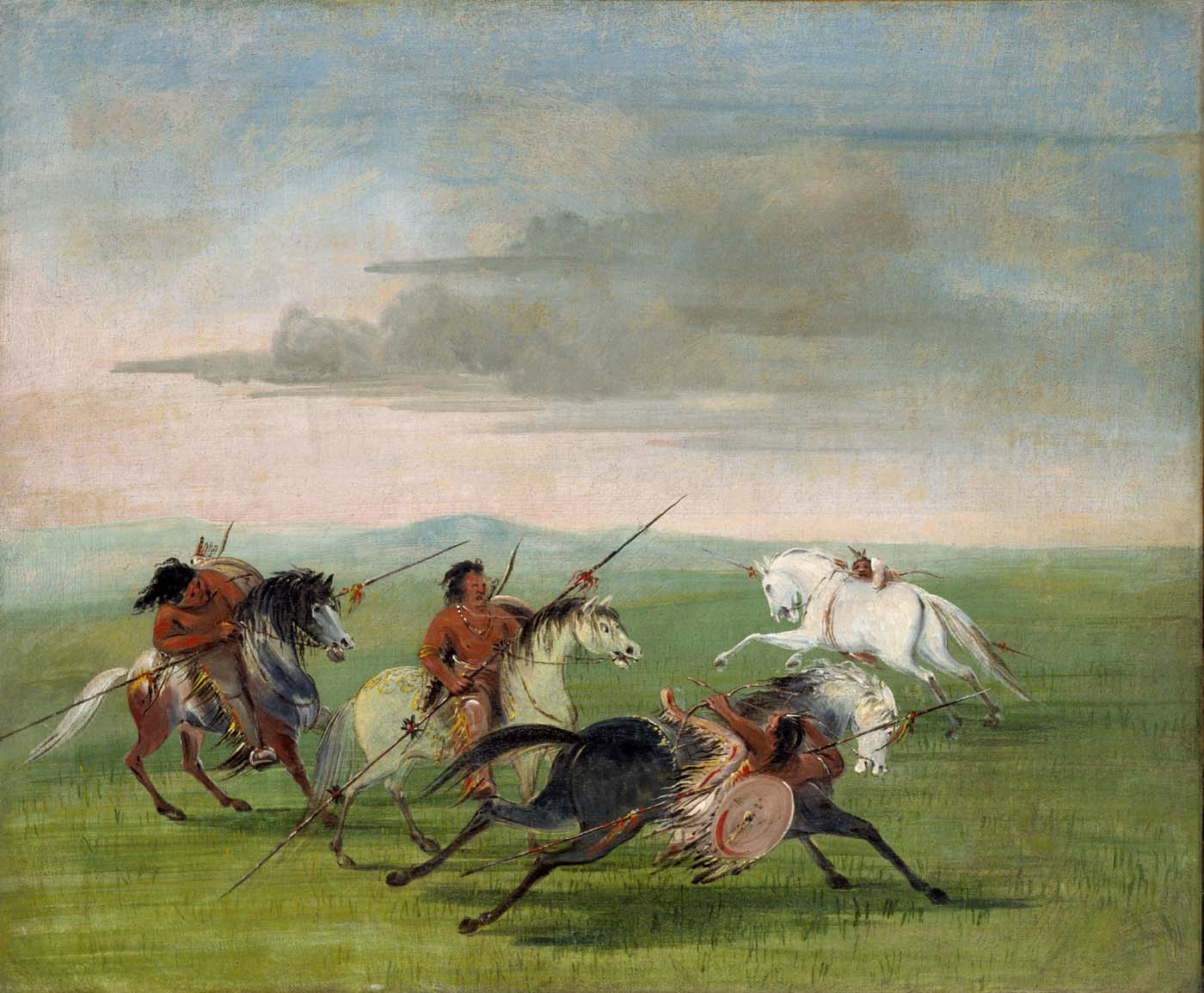
- Artist: George Catlin
- Year: 1834–1835
- Medium: Oil on canvas
- Dimensions: 60.9 cm × 73.7 cm (24.0 in × 29.0 in)
- Location: Smithsonian American Art Museum; Washington, D.C.

Comanche Feats of Horsemanship is an 1834–35 oil on canvas painting by artist George Catlin. It depicts a young man from the Comanche Nation utilizing a war on horseback technique, where he can flexibly drop his body to the side of the horse while riding it, effectively dodging enemies.

Catlin described the technique in his letters and sketches in 1834, while accompanied United States Dragoons in Indian Territory:

“Amongst their feats of riding, there is one that has astonished me more than anything of the kind I have ever seen, or expect to see, in my life:---a stratagem of war, learned and practiced by every young man in the tribe; by which he is able to drop his body upon the side of his horse at the instant he is passing, effectually screened from his enemies’ weapons as he lays in a horizontal position behind the body of his horse, with his heel hanging over the horses' back; by which he has the power of throwing himself up again, and changing to the other side of the horse if necessary. In this wonderful condition, he will hang whilst his horse is at fullest speed, carrying with him his bow and his shield, and also his long lance of fourteen feet in length, all or either of which he will wield upon his enemy as he passes; rising and throwing his arrows over the horse's back, or with equal ease and equal success under the horse's neck.”

== In popular culture ==
The painting is prominently featured in the second episode of 2019 HBO show Watchmen, the sequel to the 1987 graphic novel of the same name. The episode, "Martial Feats of Comanche Horsemanship", derives its name from the painting.

In the show, it hangs prominently in the house of Tulsa chief of police Judd Crawford (played by Don Johnson).

According to the annotated notes of the show, written in-universe by FBI Agent Dale Petey (played by Dustin Ingram), the painting was given to Crawford by Senator Joe Keene, who wrote the Keene Act, which banned costumed vigilantes except when sanctioned by the U.S. government, setting forth the events of the graphic novel.
