= 72nd Primetime Creative Arts Emmy Awards =

2020 American television programming awards

- Date: September 14–17 & 19, 2020
- Location: Virtual
- Presented by: Academy of Television Arts & Sciences
- Hosted by: Nicole Byer
- Most awards: The Mandalorian; Watchmen (7)
- Most nominations: Watchmen (15)

Television/radio coverage
- Network: Emmys.com / YouTube (Sept. 14–17); FXX (Sept. 19)
- Produced by: Bob Bain
- Directed by: Rich Preuss

The 72nd Primetime Creative Arts Emmy Awards honored the best in artistic and technical achievement in American prime time television programming from June 1, 2019, until May 31, 2020, as chosen by the Academy of Television Arts & Sciences. The awards were presented across five ceremonies; the first four were held on September 14 through 17, 2020, and were streamed online, while the fifth was held on September 19 and broadcast on FXX. They were presented in a virtual ceremony due to the COVID-19 pandemic; Nicole Byer hosted the event. A total of 106 Creative Arts Emmys were presented across 100 categories. The ceremonies preceded the 72nd Primetime Emmy Awards, held on September 20.

The Mandalorian and Watchmen led all programs with seven wins each, followed by Saturday Night Live with six and RuPaul's Drag Race with five. Watchmen was also the most-nominated program with 15 nominations; The Mandalorian followed with 14, while The Marvelous Mrs. Maisel and Saturday Night Live each received 12. Overall program awards went to 22 shows, including The Apollo, Bad Education, The Cave, Cheer, Dave Chappelle: Sticks & Stones, Jim Henson's The Dark Crystal: Age of Resistance, The Last Dance, Leah Remini: Scientology and the Aftermath, Live in Front of a Studio Audience, Queer Eye, Rick and Morty, Saturday Night Live, and We Are the Dream, among others. Netflix led all networks with 124 nominations; it also tied with HBO for the most wins, as each received 19 awards.

== Winners and nominees ==
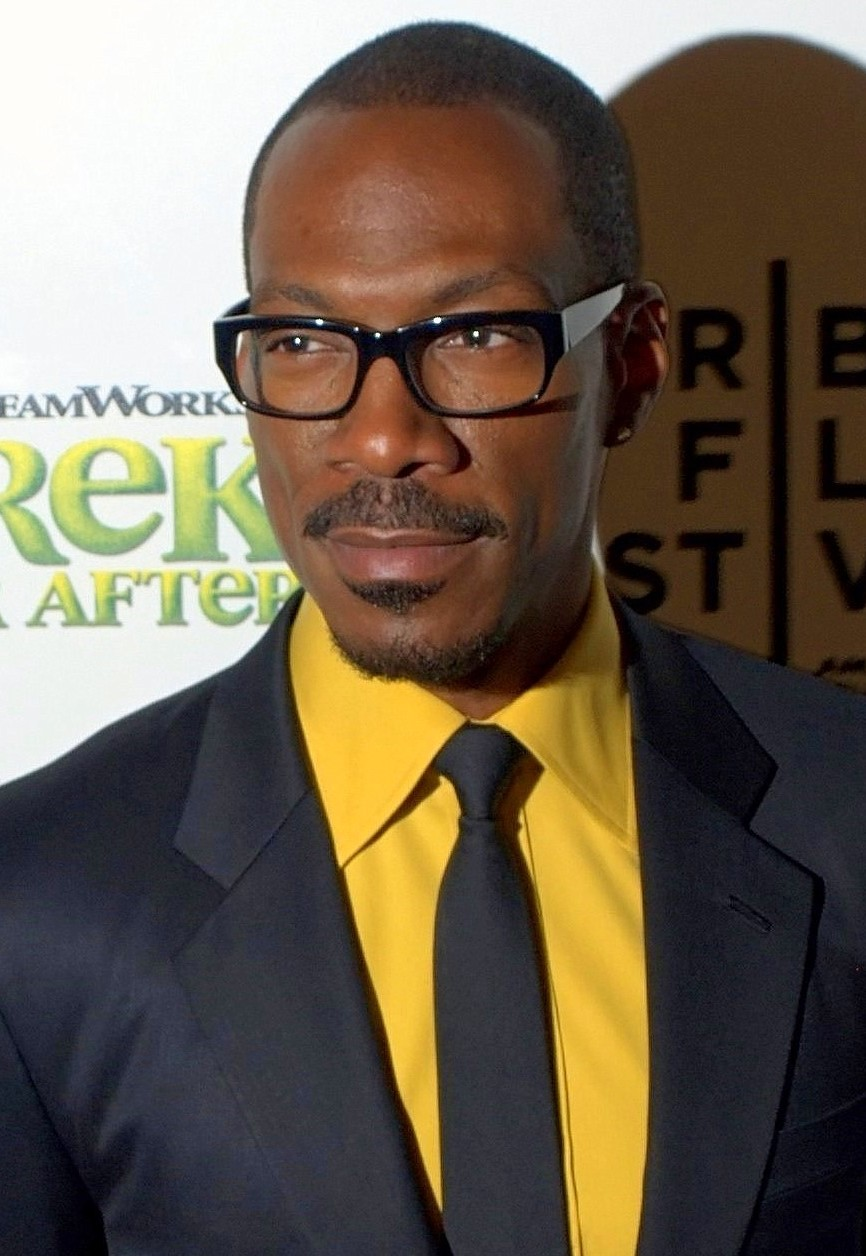
Eddie Murphy, Outstanding Guest Actor in a Comedy Series winner

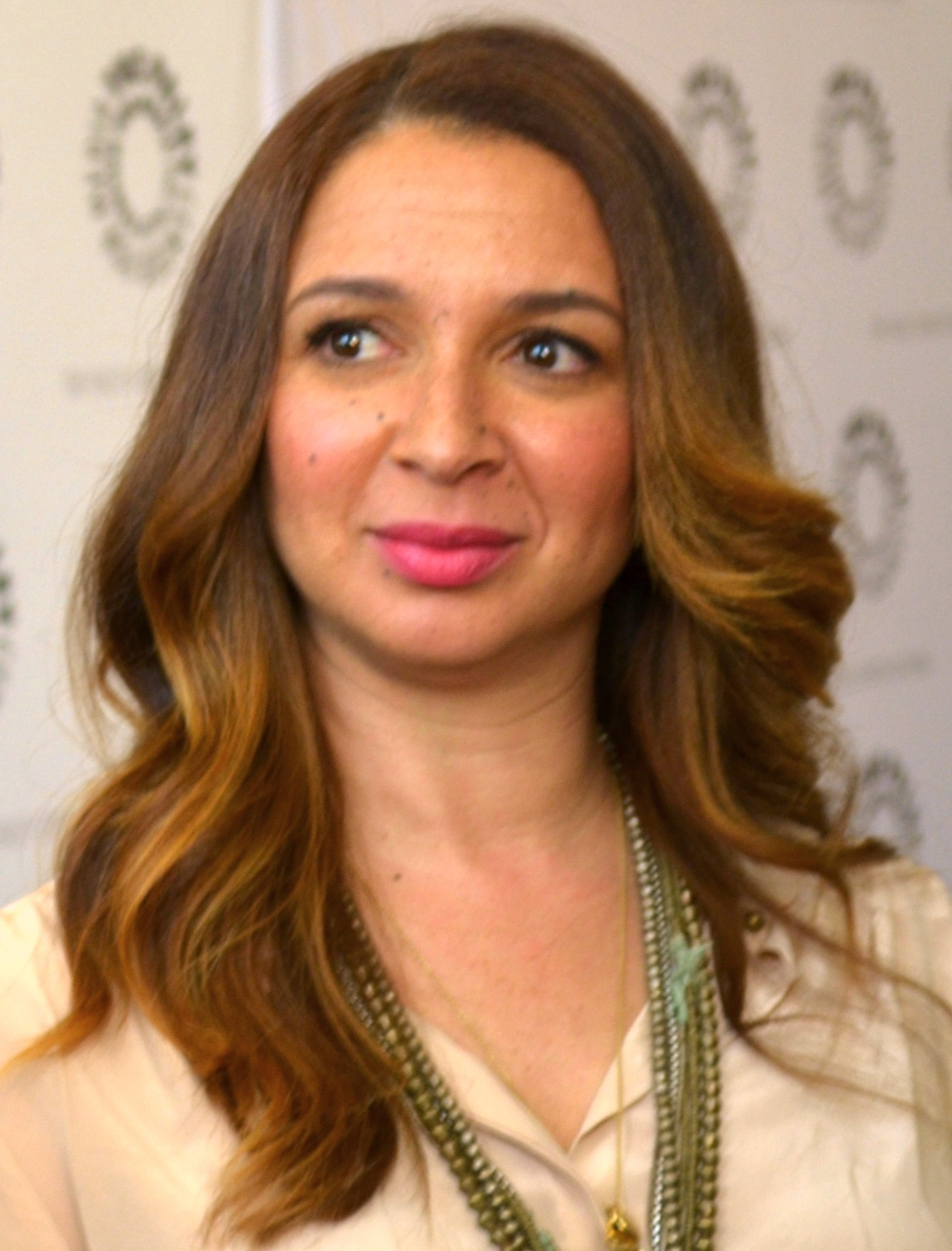
Maya Rudolph, Outstanding Guest Actress in a Comedy Series and Outstanding Character Voice-Over Performance winner

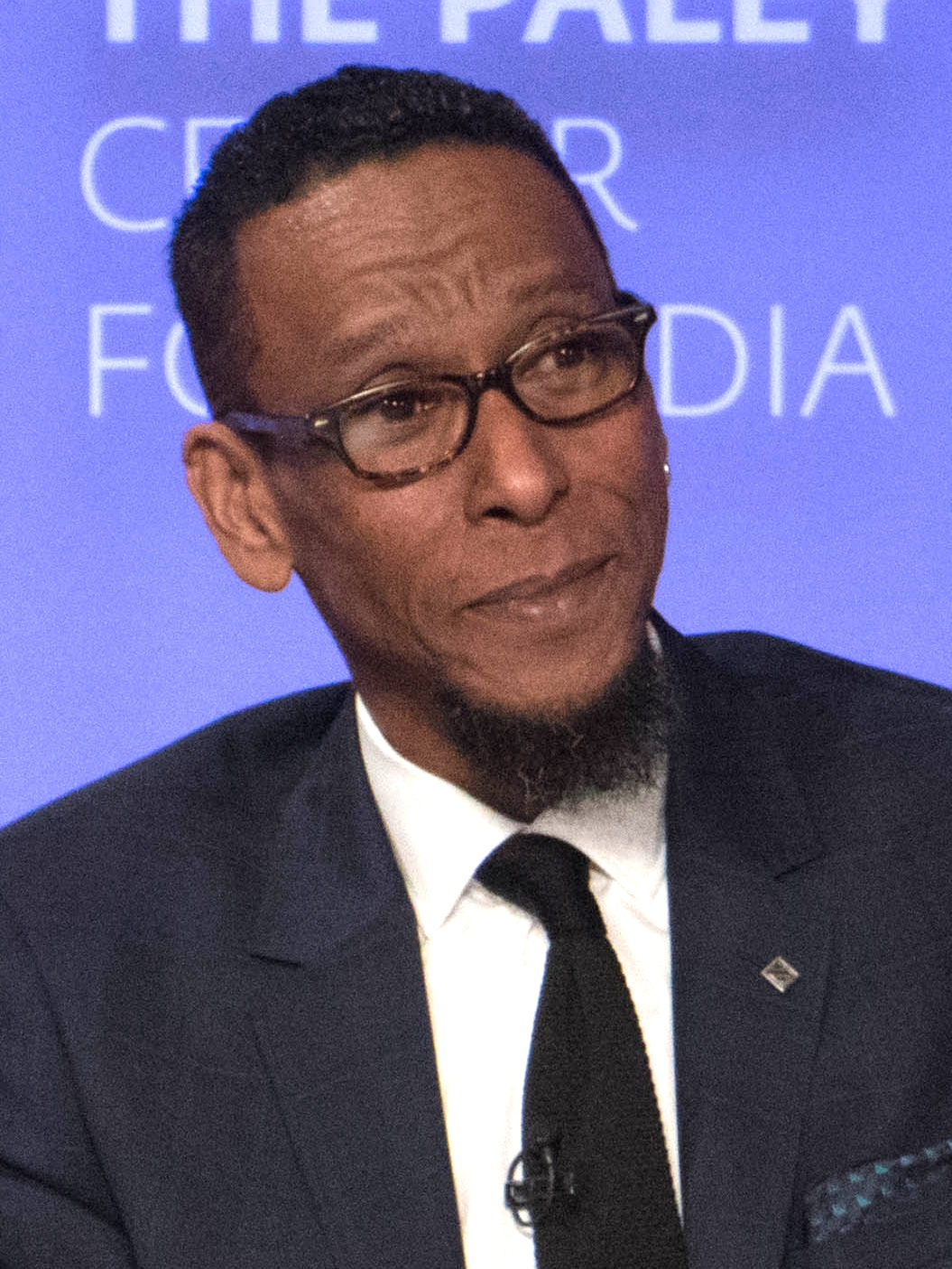
Ron Cephas Jones, Outstanding Guest Actor in a Drama Series winner

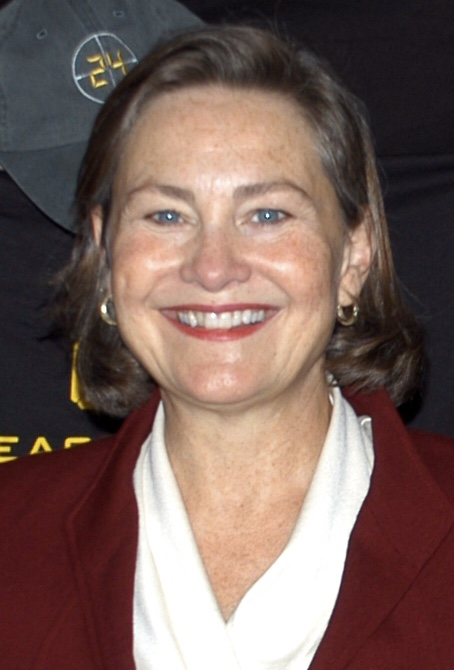
Cherry Jones, Outstanding Guest Actress in a Drama Series winner

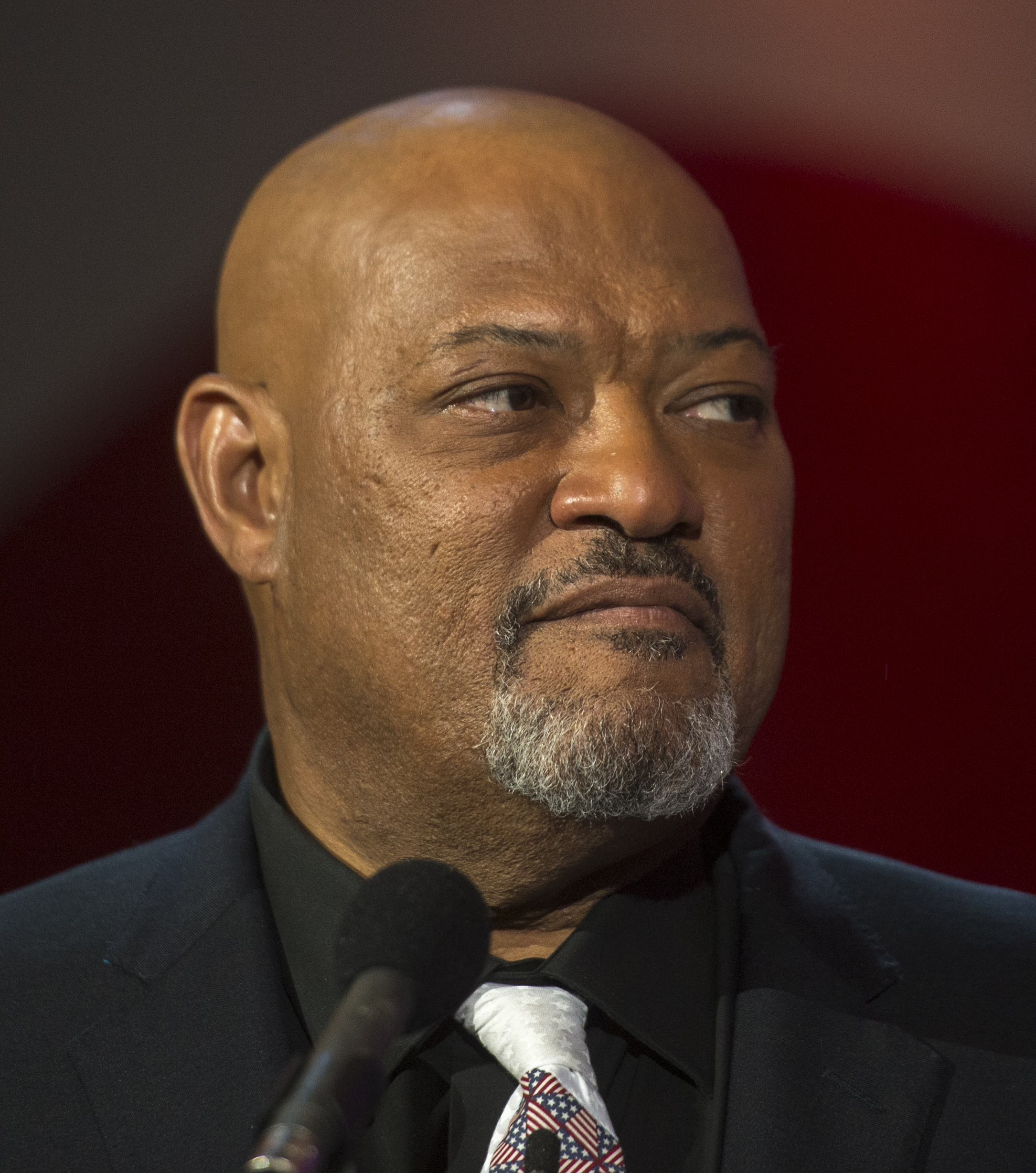
Laurence Fishburne, Outstanding Actor in a Short Form Comedy or Drama Series winner

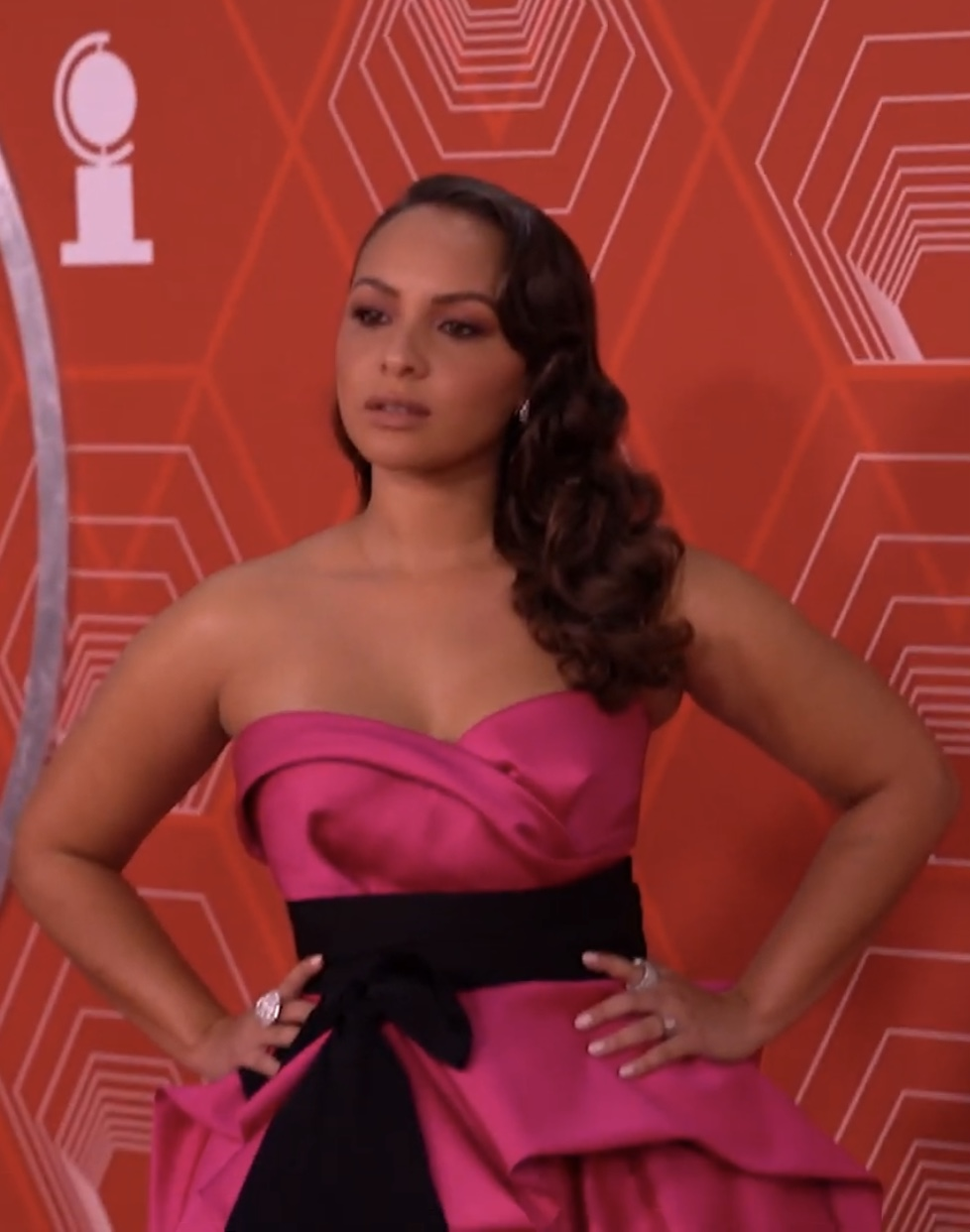
Jasmine Cephas Jones, Outstanding Actress in a Short Form Comedy or Drama Series winner

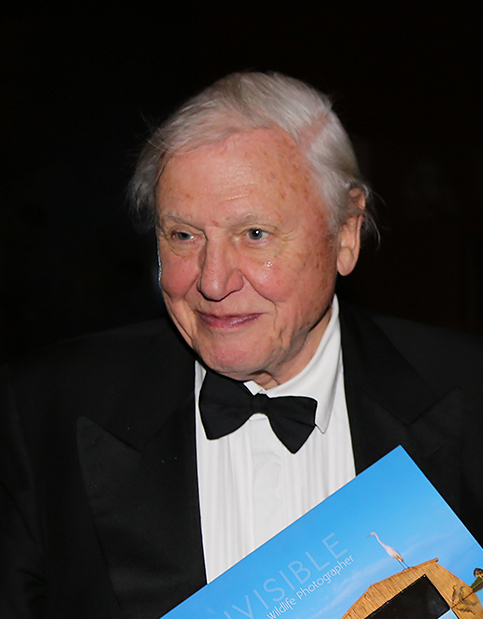
David Attenborough, Outstanding Narrator winner

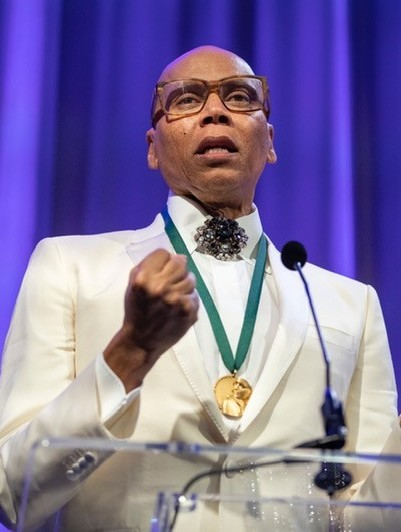
RuPaul, Outstanding Host for a Reality or Competition Program winner

Winners are listed first, highlighted in boldface, and indicated with a double dagger (‡). (Note: The outlets listed for each program are the U.S. broadcasters or streaming services identified in the nominations, which for some international productions are different than the broadcaster(s) that originally commissioned the program.) Sections are based upon the categories listed in the 2019–2020 Emmy rules and procedures. Area awards and juried awards are denoted next to the category names as applicable. (Note: Area awards are non-competitive and nominees are considered on their own terms. Any nominee with at least 90% approval (or two-thirds approval for Children's Program) received an Emmy. If no nominee received 90% approval, the nominee with the highest approval received an Emmy; for area awards in picture editing and sound mixing, there was an additional requirement that the highest-rated nominee must have at least 50% approval to receive an Emmy.; Juried awards generally do not have nominations; instead, all entrants were screened before members of the appropriate peer group, and one, more than one, or no entry was awarded an Emmy based on the jury's vote.) For simplicity, producers who received nominations for program awards have been omitted.

=== Programs ===
Programs
| **Outstanding Television Movie**: **Bad Education (HBO)**‡; American Son (Netflix); Dolly Parton's Heartstrings: These Old Bones (Netflix); El Camino: A Breaking Bad Movie (Netflix); Unbreakable Kimmy Schmidt: Kimmy vs the Reverend (Netflix) | **Outstanding Variety Sketch Series**: **Saturday Night Live (NBC)**‡; A Black Lady Sketch Show (HBO); Drunk History (Comedy Central) |
| **Outstanding Variety Special (Live)**: **Live in Front of a Studio Audience: "All in the Family" and "Good Times" (ABC)**‡; 77th Annual Golden Globe Awards (NBC); The Oscars (ABC); Super Bowl LIV Halftime Show Starring Jennifer Lopez and Shakira (Fox); 73rd Annual Tony Awards (CBS) | **Outstanding Variety Special (Pre-Recorded)**: **Dave Chappelle: Sticks & Stones (Netflix)**‡; Dave Chappelle: The Kennedy Center Mark Twain Prize for American Humor (PBS); Hannah Gadsby: Douglas (Netflix); Jerry Seinfeld: 23 Hours to Kill (Netflix); John Mulaney & the Sack Lunch Bunch (Netflix); Tiffany Haddish: Black Mitzvah (Netflix) |
| **Outstanding Children's Program (Area)**: **Jim Henson's The Dark Crystal: Age of Resistance (Netflix)**‡; **We Are the Dream: The Kids of the Oakland MLK Oratorical Fest (HBO)**‡; Star Wars Resistance (Disney Channel) | **Outstanding Animated Program**: **Rick and Morty: "The Vat of Acid Episode" (Adult Swim)**‡; Big Mouth: "Disclosure the Movie: The Musical!" (Netflix); Bob's Burgers: "Pig Trouble in Little Tina" (Fox); BoJack Horseman: "The View from Halfway Down" (Netflix); The Simpsons: "Thanksgiving of Horror" (Fox) |
| **Outstanding Structured Reality Program**: **Queer Eye (Netflix)**‡; Antiques Roadshow (PBS); Love Is Blind (Netflix); Shark Tank (ABC); A Very Brady Renovation (HGTV) | **Outstanding Unstructured Reality Program**: **Cheer (Netflix)**‡; Amy Schumer Learns to Cook: Lunch Break and Pasta Night (Food Network); Kevin Hart: Don't F**k This Up (Netflix); RuPaul's Drag Race: Untucked (VH1); We're Here (HBO) |
| **Outstanding Documentary or Nonfiction Series (Area)**: **The Last Dance (ESPN)**‡; American Masters (PBS); Hillary (Hulu); McMillion$ (HBO); Tiger King: Murder, Mayhem and Madness (Netflix) | **Outstanding Documentary or Nonfiction Special (Area)**: **The Apollo (HBO)**‡; Beastie Boys Story (Apple TV+); Becoming (Netflix); The Great Hack (Netflix); Laurel Canyon: A Place in Time (Epix) |
| **Outstanding Hosted Nonfiction Series or Special (Area)**: **Leah Remini: Scientology and the Aftermath (A&E)**‡; Comedians in Cars Getting Coffee (Netflix); Ugly Delicious (Netflix); Vice (Showtime); The World According to Jeff Goldblum (Disney+) | **Exceptional Merit in Documentary Filmmaking (Juried)**: **The Cave (National Geographic)**‡; Chasing the Moon (American Experience) (PBS); Moonlight Sonata: Deafness in Three Movements (HBO); One Child Nation (Prime Video) |
| **Outstanding Short Form Comedy or Drama Series**: **Better Call Saul Employee Training: Legal Ethics with Kim Wexler (AMC.com)**‡; The Good Place Presents: The Selection (NBC); Most Dangerous Game (Quibi); Reno 911! (Quibi); Star Trek: Short Treks (CBS All Access) | **Outstanding Short Form Variety Series**: **Carpool Karaoke: The Series (Apple TV)**‡; Beeing at Home with Samantha Bee (TBS); Between Two Ferns with Zach Galifianakis: The Movie, Sorta Uncut Interviews (Netflix); Jimmy Kimmel's Quarantine Minilogues (YouTube/JimmyKimmelLive); The Randy Rainbow Show (YouTube) |
| **Outstanding Short Form Nonfiction or Reality Series**: **National Geographic Presents: Creating Cosmos: Possible Worlds (National Geographic)**‡; Between The Scenes – The Daily Show (Comedy Central); Full Frontal with Samantha Bee Presents: Pandemic Video Diaries (TBS); Pose: Identity, Family, Community (FX); RuPaul's Drag Race Out Of The Closet (VH1) | **Outstanding Short Form Animated Program**: **Forky Asks a Question: What Is Love? (Disney+)**‡; Robot Chicken: "Santa's Dead (Spoiler Alert) Holiday Murder Thing Special" (Adult Swim); Steven Universe Future: "Fragments" (Cartoon Network) |
| **Outstanding Original Interactive Program**: **The Messy Truth VR Experience (Oculus)**‡; Rebuilding Notre Dame (Oculus); When We Stayed Home (Oculus) | **Outstanding Derivative Interactive Program**: **Big Mouth Guide to Life (Netflix)**‡; Doctor Who: The Runaway (BBC America) |
| **Outstanding Interactive Extension of a Linear Program**: **Mr. Robot: Season_4.0 ARG (USA Network)**‡; Stranger Things: Scoops Ahoy: Operation Scoop Snoop (Netflix); Westworld: Free Will is Not Free Interactive Experience (HBO) | **Outstanding Innovation in Interactive Programming (Juried)**: **Create Together (YouTube)**‡; **The Line (Oculus)**‡ |

=== Performing ===
Performing
| **Outstanding Guest Actor in a Comedy Series**: **Eddie Murphy – Saturday Night Live: "Host: Eddie Murphy" as host (NBC)**‡; Adam Driver – Saturday Night Live: "Host: Adam Driver" as host (NBC); Luke Kirby – The Marvelous Mrs. Maisel: "It's Comedy or Cabbage" as Lenny Bruce (Prime Video); Dev Patel – Modern Love: "When Cupid Is a Prying Journalist" as Joshua (Prime Video); Brad Pitt – Saturday Night Live: "SNL at Home #2" as Dr. Anthony Fauci (NBC); Fred Willard – Modern Family: "Legacy" as Frank Dunphy (ABC) | **Outstanding Guest Actress in a Comedy Series**: **Maya Rudolph – Saturday Night Live: "Host: Eddie Murphy" as Senator Kamala Harris (NBC)**‡; Angela Bassett – A Black Lady Sketch Show: "Angela Bassett Is the Baddest Bitch" as Mo (HBO); Bette Midler – The Politician: "Vienna" as Hadassah Gold (Netflix); Maya Rudolph – The Good Place: "You've Changed, Man" as the Judge (NBC); Wanda Sykes – The Marvelous Mrs. Maisel: "A Jewish Girl Walks Into the Apollo..." as Moms Mabley (Prime Video); Phoebe Waller-Bridge – Saturday Night Live: "Host: Phoebe Waller-Bridge" as host (NBC) |
| **Outstanding Guest Actor in a Drama Series**: **Ron Cephas Jones – This Is Us: "After the Fire" as William Hill (NBC)**‡; Jason Bateman – The Outsider: "Fish in a Barrel" as Terry Maitland (HBO); James Cromwell – Succession: "Dundee" as Ewan Roy (HBO); Giancarlo Esposito – The Mandalorian: "Chapter 8: Redemption" as Moff Gideon (Disney+); Andrew Scott – Black Mirror: "Smithereens" as Chris Gillhaney (Netflix); Martin Short – The Morning Show: "Chaos Is the New Cocaine" as Dick Lundy (Apple TV+) | **Outstanding Guest Actress in a Drama Series**: **Cherry Jones – Succession: "Tern Haven" as Nan Pierce (HBO)**‡; Alexis Bledel – The Handmaid's Tale: "God Bless the Child" as Emily (Hulu); Laverne Cox – Orange Is the New Black: "God Bless America" as Sophia Burset (Netflix); Phylicia Rashad – This Is Us: "Flip a Coin" as Carol Clarke (NBC); Cicely Tyson – How to Get Away with Murder: "Stay" as Ophelia Harkness (ABC); Harriet Walter – Succession: "Return" as Lady Caroline Collingwood (HBO) |
| **Outstanding Actor in a Short Form Comedy or Drama Series**: **Laurence Fishburne – #FreeRayshawn as Lt. Steven Poincy (Quibi)**‡; Mamoudou Athie – Oh Jerome, No (Cake) as Jerome (FX); Corey Hawkins – Survive as Paul (Quibi); Stephan James – #FreeRayshawn as Rayshawn (Quibi); Christoph Waltz – Most Dangerous Game as Miles Sellers (Quibi) | **Outstanding Actress in a Short Form Comedy or Drama Series**: **Jasmine Cephas Jones – #FreeRayshawn as Tyisha (Quibi)**‡; Anna Kendrick – Dummy as Cody (Quibi); Kerri Kenney-Silver – Reno 911! as Deputy Trudy Wiegel (Quibi); Kaitlin Olson – Flipped as Cricket Melfi (Quibi); Rain Valdez – Razor Tongue as Belle Jonas (YouTube) |
| **Outstanding Character Voice-Over Performance**: **Maya Rudolph – Big Mouth: "How to Have an Orgasm" as Connie the Hormone Monstress (Netflix)**‡; Hank Azaria – The Simpsons: "Frinkcoin" as Professor Frink, Moe, Chief Wiggum, Carl, Cletus, Kirk, and Sea Captain (Fox); Nancy Cartwright – The Simpsons: "Better Off Ned" as Bart Simpson, Nelson, Ralph, and Todd (Fox); Leslie Odom Jr. – Central Park: "Episode One" as Owen (Apple TV+); Wanda Sykes – Crank Yankers: "Bobby Brown, Wanda Sykes & Kathy Griffin" as Gladys (Comedy Central); Taika Waititi – The Mandalorian: "Chapter 8: Redemption" as IG-11 (Disney+) | **Outstanding Narrator**: **David Attenborough – Seven Worlds, One Planet: "Antarctica" (BBC America)**‡; Kareem Abdul-Jabbar – Black Patriots: Heroes of the Revolution (History); Angela Bassett – The Imagineering Story: "The Happiest Place on Earth" (Disney+); Chiwetel Ejiofor – The Elephant Queen (Apple TV+); Lupita Nyong'o – Serengeti: "Destiny" (Discovery Channel) |
**Outstanding Host for a Reality or Competition Program**: **RuPaul – RuPaul's Drag Race (VH1)**‡; Bobby Berk, Karamo Brown, Tan France, Antoni Porowski, and Jonathan Van Ness – Queer Eye (Netflix); Nicole Byer – Nailed It! (Netflix); Barbara Corcoran, Mark Cuban, Lori Greiner, Daymond John, Robert Herjavec, and Kevin O'Leary – Shark Tank (ABC); Padma Lakshmi and Tom Colicchio – Top Chef (Bravo); Amy Poehler and Nick Offerman – Making It (NBC)

=== Animation ===
Animation
**Outstanding Individual Achievement in Animation (Juried)**
- **Archer: "Road Trip" – Jill Dykxhoorn (FX)**‡
- **Cosmos: Possible Worlds: "Vavilov" – Dan MacKenzie (National Geographic)**‡
- **Genndy Tartakovsky's Primal: "A Cold Death" – Stephen DeStefano (Adult Swim)**‡
- **Genndy Tartakovsky's Primal: "Spear and Fang" – Genndy Tartakovsky (Adult Swim)**‡
- **Genndy Tartakovsky's Primal: "Spear and Fang" – Scott Wills (Adult Swim)**‡

=== Art Direction ===
Art Direction
| **Outstanding Production Design for a Narrative Contemporary Program (One Hour or More) (Area)**: **The Handmaid's Tale: "Household" – Elisabeth Williams, Martha Sparrow, and Robert Hepburn (Hulu)**‡; Big Little Lies: "What Have They Done?" / "The Bad Mother" / "I Want To Know" – John Paino, Austin Gorg, and Amy Wells (HBO); Killing Eve: "Are You from Pinner?" – Laurence Dorman, Beckie Harvey, and Casey Williams (BBC America); The Morning Show: "In the Dark Night of the Soul It's Always 3:30 in the Morning" – John Paino, James F. Truesdale, and Amy Wells (Apple TV+); Ozark: "Wartime" – David Bomba, Sean Ryan Jennings, and Kim Leoleis (Netflix); Succession: "This Is Not for Tears" – Stephen H. Carter, Carmen Cardenas, George DeTitta, and Ana Buljan (HBO) | **Outstanding Production Design for a Narrative Period or Fantasy Program (One Hour or More) (Area)**: **The Crown: "Aberfan" – Martin Childs, Mark Raggett, and Alison Harvey (Netflix)**‡; Hollywood – Matthew Flood Ferguson, Mark Robert Taylor, and Melissa Licht (Netflix); The Marvelous Mrs. Maisel: "It's Comedy or Cabbage" / "A Jewish Girl Walks Into the Apollo..." – Bill Groom, Neil Prince, and Ellen Christiansen (Prime Video); Watchmen: "An Almost Religious Awe" – Kristian Milsted, Jay Pelissier, and Edward McLoughlin (HBO); Westworld: "Parce Domine" – Howard Cummings, Jon Carlos, and Julie Ochipinti (HBO) |
| **Outstanding Production Design for a Narrative Program (Half-Hour) (Area)**: **The Mandalorian: "Chapter 1: The Mandalorian" – Andrew L. Jones, Jeff Wisniewski, and Amanda Serino (Disney+)**‡; GLOW: "Up, Up, Up" – Todd Fjelsted, Valerie Green, and Cynthia Slagter (Netflix); Space Force: "The Launch" – Susie Mancini, Gary Warshaw, and Rachael Ferrara (Netflix); What We Do in the Shadows: "Resurrection" / "Collaboration" / "Witches" – Kate Bunch, Aleks Cameron, and Shayne Fox (FX); Will & Grace: "We Love Lucy" – Glenda Rovello, Conny Boettger-Marinos, and Peter Gurski (NBC) | **Outstanding Production Design for a Variety, Reality or Competition Series (Area)**: **Saturday Night Live: "Host: Eddie Murphy" / "Host: John Mulaney" – Eugene Lee, Akira Yoshimura, Keith Ian Raywood, and N. Joseph DeTullio (NBC)**‡; At Home with Amy Sedaris: "Outdoor Entertaining" / "Travel" – Jason Singleton, Katy Porter, and Naomi Munro (truTV); Drunk History: "Bad Blood" – Monica Sotto, Rae Deslich, and Linette McCown (Comedy Central); Last Week Tonight with John Oliver: "Episode 629" – Eric Morrell and Amanda Carzoli (HBO); Queer Eye: "We're in Japan!: The Ideal Woman" – Thomas Rouse (Netflix) |
**Outstanding Production Design for a Variety Special (Area)**: **The Oscars – Jason Sherwood and Alana Billingsley (ABC)**‡; 77th Annual Golden Globe Awards – Brian Stonestreet and Angel Herrera (NBC); 62nd Grammy Awards – Brian Stonestreet, Kristen Merlino, Gloria Lamb, and Jason Howard (CBS); The Little Mermaid Live! – Misty Buckley, Joe Celli, and Jason Howard (ABC); Live in Front of a Studio Audience: "All in the Family" and "Good Times" – Bernard Vyzga, Richard Rohrer, and Ron Olsen (ABC)

=== Casting ===
Casting
| **Outstanding Casting for a Comedy Series**: **Schitt's Creek – Lisa Parasyn and Jon Comerford (Pop TV)**‡; Curb Your Enthusiasm – Allison Jones and Ben Harris (HBO); Dead to Me – Sherry Thomas, Russell Scott, and Sharon Bialy (Netflix); Insecure – Victoria Thomas and Matthew Maisto (HBO); The Marvelous Mrs. Maisel – Cindy Tolan (Prime Video); What We Do in the Shadows – Gayle Keller, Jenny Lewis, and Sara Kay (FX) | **Outstanding Casting for a Drama Series**: **Succession – Avy Kaufman (HBO)**‡; Big Little Lies – David Rubin (HBO); The Crown – Nina Gold and Robert Sterne (Netflix); The Handmaid's Tale – Sharon Bialy, Sherry Thomas, Russell Scott, and Robin D. Cook (Hulu); Killing Eve – Gilly Poole and Suzanne Crowley (BBC America); Ozark – Alexa L. Fogel, Tara Feldstein Bennett, and Chase Paris (Netflix) |
| **Outstanding Casting for a Limited Series, Movie or Special**: **Watchmen – Victoria Thomas and Meagan Lewis (HBO)**‡; Mrs. America – Carmen Cuba and Robin D. Cook (FX); Normal People – Louise Kiely (Hulu); Unbelievable – Laura Rosenthal, Jodi Angstreich, Kate Caldwell, and Melissa Kostenbauder (Netflix); Unorthodox – Esther King, Vicki Thomson, Maria Rölcke, and Cornelia Mareth (Netflix) | **Outstanding Casting for a Reality Program**: **RuPaul's Drag Race – Goloka Bolte and Ethan Petersen (VH1)**‡; Born This Way – Sasha Alpert, Megan Sleeper, and Caitlyn Audet (A&E); Love Is Blind – Donna Driscoll, Kelly Zack Castillo, and Megan Feldman (Netflix); Queer Eye – Danielle Gervais, Beyhan Oguz, Pamela Vallarelli, Ally Capriotti Grant, and Hana Sakata (Netflix); The Voice – Michelle McNulty, Holly Dale, and Courtney Burns (NBC) |

=== Choreography ===
Choreography
| **Outstanding Choreography for Variety or Reality Programming (Juried)**: **So You Think You Can Dance: "I'll Be Seeing You" / "Mambo Italiano" / "The Girl from Ipanema" – Al Blackstone (Fox)**‡; The Oscars: "Come Alive (Opening Sequence)" – Jemel McWilliams (ABC); Savage X Fenty Show: "Statues" / "Benches" / "Window" – Parris Goebel (Prime Video); So You Think You Can Dance: "Enough Is Enough" / "Sign of the Times" – Travis Wall (Fox); World of Dance: "Dos Jueyes" / "El Ray Timbal" – Jefferson Benjumea and Adrianita Avila (NBC) | **Outstanding Choreography for Scripted Programming (Juried)**: **Zoey's Extraordinary Playlist: "All I Do Is Win" / "I've Got the Music in Me" / "Crazy" – Mandy Moore (NBC)**‡ |

=== Cinematography ===
Cinematography
| **Outstanding Cinematography for a Multi-Camera Series**: **The Ranch: "It Ain't My Fault" – Donald A. Morgan (Netflix)**‡; Bob Hearts Abishola: "Ice Cream for Breakfast" – Patti Lee (CBS); Family Reunion: "Remember Black Elvis?" – John Simmons (Netflix); Will & Grace: "Accidentally on Porpoise" – Gary Baum (NBC) | **Outstanding Cinematography for a Single-Camera Series (Half-Hour)**: **The Mandalorian: "Chapter 7: The Reckoning" – Greig Fraser and Baz Idoine (Disney+)**‡; The End of the F***ing World: "Episode 2" – Benedict Spence (Netflix); Homecoming: "Giant" – Jas Shelton (Prime Video); Insecure: "Lowkey Happy" – Kira Kelly (HBO); Insecure: "Lowkey Lost" – Ava Berkofsky (HBO) |
| **Outstanding Cinematography for a Single-Camera Series (One Hour)**: **The Marvelous Mrs. Maisel: "It's Comedy or Cabbage" – M. David Mullen (Prime Video)**‡; The Crown: "Aberfan" – Adriano Goldman (Netflix); Mindhunter: "Episode 6" – Erik Messerschmidt (Netflix); Ozark: "Boss Fight" – Armando Salas (Netflix); Ozark: "Civil Union" – Ben Kutchins (Netflix); Tales from the Loop: "Loop" – Jeff Cronenweth (Prime Video); Westworld: "Parce Domine" – Paul Cameron (HBO) | **Outstanding Cinematography for a Limited Series or Movie**: **Watchmen: "This Extraordinary Being" – Gregory Middleton (HBO)**‡; Defending Jacob: "After" – Jonathan Freeman (Apple TV+); Devs: "Episode 7" – Rob Hardy (FX); The Plot Against America: "Part 1" – Martin Ahlgren (HBO); Watchmen: "Little Fear of Lightning" – Xavier Pérez Grobet (HBO) |
| **Outstanding Cinematography for a Nonfiction Program**: **The Cave – Muhammed Khair Al Shami, Ammar Suleiman, and Mohammed Eyad (National Geographic)**‡; American Factory – Erick Stoll and Aubrey Keith (Netflix); Apollo 11 – Buzz Aldrin and Michael Collins (CNN); Becoming – Nadia Hallgren (Netflix); Sea of Shadows – Richard Ladkani (National Geographic); Serengeti: "Rebirth" – Richard Jones, Michael W. Richards, Warren Samuels, and Matthew Goodman (Discovery Channel) | **Outstanding Cinematography for a Reality Program**: **Life Below Zero – Michael Cheeseman, Danny Day, Dwayne Fowler, John Griber, Simeon Houtman, and Ben Mullin (National Geographic)**‡; Cheer: "Hit Zero" – Melissa Langer and Erynn Patrick (Netflix); Queer Eye: "We're in Japan!: Japanese Holiday" – Garrett Rose (Netflix); RuPaul's Drag Race – Michael Jacob Kerber, Jon Schneider, Jay Mack Arnette II, Mario Panagiotopoulos, Gregory Montes, Brett Smith, David McCoul, and Justin Umphenour (VH1); Survivor – Peter Wery, Scott Duncan, Russ Fill, Tim Barker, Marc Bennett, James Boon, Paulo Castillo, Rodney Chauvin, Luke Cormack, Lee Doig, Ben Gamble, Kevin B. Garrison, Nixon George, Rick Higgs, Derek Hoffmann, Matthias Hoffmann, Toby Hogan, Derek Holt, Efrain "Mofi" Laguna, Ian Miller, Nico Nyoni, Ryan O'Donnell, Jeff Phillips, Louis Powell, Thomas Pretorius, Erick Sarmiento, Dirk Steyn, John Tattersall, Paulo Velozo, David Alan Arnold, Christopher Barker, Granger Scholtz, and Nicholas Van Der Westhuizen (CBS) |

=== Commercial ===
Commercial
**Outstanding Commercial**
- **"Back-To-School Essentials" – SMUGGLER and BBDO New York (Sandy Hook Promise)**‡
  - "Before Alexa" – Somesuch x Revolver/Will O'Rourke and Droga5 London (Amazon)
  - "Bounce" – Pulse Films and TBWA Media Arts Lab (Apple AirPods)
  - "Groundhog Day" – O Positive and Highdive Advertising (Jeep / Fiat Chrysler Automobiles)
  - "The Look" – Stink Films and Saturday Morning (P&G)

=== Costumes ===
Costumes
| **Outstanding Period Costumes (Area)**: **The Crown: "Cri de Coeur" – Amy Roberts, Sidonie Roberts, and Sarah Moore (Netflix)**‡; Hollywood: "A Hollywood Ending" – Lou Eyrich, Sarah Evelyn, Tiger Curran, and Suzy Freeman (Netflix); The Marvelous Mrs. Maisel: "It's Comedy or Cabbage" – Donna Zakowska, Marina Reti, Sheila Grover, and Ginnie Patton (Prime Video); Mrs. America: "Shirley" – Bina Daigeler, Erin Byrne, Mila Hermanovski, Eileen Kennedy, Sheryl Willock, Bettina Seifert, and Erika Larner (FX); Pose: "Acting Up" – Analucia McGorty, Nicole Jescinth Smith, Alexa De Fasio, and Linda Giammarese (FX) | **Outstanding Fantasy/Sci-Fi Costumes (Area)**: **Watchmen: "It's Summer and We're Running Out of Ice" – Sharen Davis and Valerie Zielonka (HBO)**‡; Carnival Row: "Aisling" – Joanna Eatwell, Clare Vyse, and Jennifer Lander (Prime Video); The Handmaid's Tale: "Household" – Natalie Bronfman, Helena Davis Perry, and Christina Cattle (Hulu); The Mandalorian: "Chapter 3: The Sin" – Joseph Porro, Julie Robar, Giovanna Ottobre-Melton, and Lauren Silvestri (Disney+); Westworld: "Parce Domine" – Shay Cunliffe, Dan Bronson, Amanda Riley, Giorgia Tramontno, and Jo Kissack Folsom (HBO) |
| **Outstanding Contemporary Costumes (Area)**: **Schitt's Creek: "Happy Ending" – Debra Hanson and Darci Cheyne (Pop TV)**‡; Black-ish: "Hair Day" – Michelle R. Cole and Juliann DeVito (ABC); Euphoria: "The Next Episode" – Heidi Bivens, Danielle Baker, and Katina Danabassis (HBO); Grace and Frankie: "The Tank" – Allyson B. Fanger, Kristine Haag, and Lori DeLapp (Netflix); Killing Eve: "Are You from Pinner?" – Sam Perry, Katie Broome, and Justin Selway (BBC America); The Politician: "Pilot" – Lou Eyrich, Claire Parkinson, Lily Parkinson, and Nora Pedersen (Netflix); Unorthodox: "Part 2" – Justine Seymour, Simone Kreska, and Barbara Schramm (Netflix) | **Outstanding Costumes for Variety, Nonfiction or Reality Programming (Area)**: **The Masked Singer: "The Season Kick-Off Mask-Off: Group A" – Marina Toybina, Grainne O'Sullivan, Gabrielle Letamendi, and Candice Rainwater (Fox)**‡; Dancing with the Stars: "Halloween Night" – Daniela Gschwendtner, Steven Lee, Howard Sussman, Polina Roytman, and Karina Torrico (ABC); Drunk History: "Fame" – Christina Mongini, Annalisa Adams, and Cassandra Conners (Comedy Central); RuPaul's Drag Race: "I'm That Bitch" – Zaldy Goco (VH1); Saturday Night Live: "Host: Eddie Murphy" – Tom Broecker, Eric Justian, Cristina Natividad, Ashley Dudek, Karena Sanchez, and Dale Richards (NBC) |

=== Directing ===
Directing
| **Outstanding Directing for a Variety Series**: **Saturday Night Live: "Host: Eddie Murphy" – Don Roy King (NBC)**‡; A Black Lady Sketch Show: "Born at Night, But Not Last Night" – Dime Davis (HBO); The Daily Show with Trevor Noah: "Dr. Fauci Answers Trevor's Questions About Coronavirus" – David Paul Meyer (Comedy Central); Last Week Tonight with John Oliver: "Episode 629" – Paul Pennolino and Christopher Werner (HBO); The Late Show with Stephen Colbert: "Live Show; Chris Christie; Nathaniel Rateliff" – Jim Hoskinson (CBS); Tiffany Haddish Presents: They Ready: "Flame Monroe" – Linda Mendoza (Netflix) | **Outstanding Directing for a Variety Special**: **Dave Chappelle: Sticks & Stones – Stan Lathan (Netflix)**‡; 62nd Grammy Awards – Louis J. Horvitz (CBS); Live in Front of a Studio Audience: "All in the Family" and "Good Times" – Pamela Fryman and Andy Fisher (ABC); Super Bowl LIV Halftime Show Starring Jennifer Lopez and Shakira – Hamish Hamilton (Fox); 73rd Annual Tony Awards – Glenn Weiss (CBS) |
| **Outstanding Directing for a Documentary/Nonfiction Program**: **American Factory – Steven Bognar and Julia Reichert (Netflix)**‡; Apollo 11 – Todd Douglas Miller (CNN); Becoming – Nadia Hallgren (Netflix); The Cave – Feras Fayyad (National Geographic); The Last Dance: "Episode 7" – Jason Hehir (ESPN); Tiger King: Murder, Mayhem and Madness: "Cult of Personality" – Eric Goode and Rebecca Chaiklin (Netflix) | **Outstanding Directing for a Reality Program**: **Cheer: "Daytona" – Greg Whiteley (Netflix)**‡; LEGO Masters: "Mega City Block" – Rich Kim (Fox); Queer Eye: "Disabled but Not Really" – Hisham Abed (Netflix); RuPaul's Drag Race: "I'm That Bitch" – Nick Murray (VH1); Top Chef: "The Jonathan Gold Standard" – Ariel Boles (Bravo) |

=== Hairstyling ===
Hairstyling
| **Outstanding Contemporary Hairstyling**: **Black-ish: "Hair Day" – Araxi Lindsey, Robert C. Mathews III, and Enoch Williams (ABC)**‡; Grace and Frankie: "The Laughing Stock" – Kelly Kline, Jonathan Hanousek, and Marlene Williams (Netflix); The Handmaid's Tale: "Liars" – Paul Elliot and Ewa Latak-Cynk (Hulu); The Politician: "Pilot" – Chris Clark, Natalie Driscoll, and Havana Prats (Netflix); Schitt's Creek: "Happy Ending" – Annastasia Cucullo and Ana Sorys (Pop TV); This Is Us: "Strangers: Part Two" – Michael Peter Reitz, Katherine Rees, Germicka Barclay, Renia Green-Edittorio, and Corey Hill (NBC) | **Outstanding Period and/or Character Hairstyling**: **Hollywood: "A Hollywood Ending" – Michelle Ceglia, Barry Lee Moe, George Guzman, Michele Arvizo, and Maria Elena Pantoja (Netflix)**‡; The Crown: "Cri de Coeur" – Cate Hall, Louise Coles, Sarah Nuth, Suzanne David, and Catriona Johnstone (Netflix); The Marvelous Mrs. Maisel: "A Jewish Girl Walks Into the Apollo..." – Kimberley Spiteri, Michael S. Ward, and Tijen Osman (Prime Video); Pose: "Worth It" – Barry Lee Moe, Timothy Harvey, Sabana Majeed, Liliana Maggio, Lisa Thomas, Greg Bazemore, Jessie Mojica, and Charlene Belmond (FX); Star Trek: Picard: "Stardust City Rag" – Maxine Morris, Maria Sandoval, Wendy Southard, Sallie Nicole Ciganovich, Ashleigh Childers, and Yesim Osman (CBS All Access) |
**Outstanding Contemporary Hairstyling for a Variety, Nonfiction or Reality Program**: **RuPaul's Drag Race: "I'm That Bitch" – Curtis Foreman and Ryan Randall (VH1)**‡; A Celebration of the Music from Coco – Jennifer Guerrero, Yvonne Kupka, Kimi Messina, Gail Ryan, Amber Maher, Yiotis Panayiotou, and Megg Massey (Disney+); Dancing with the Stars: "Episode 2802" – Mary Guerrero, Kimi Messina, Gail Ryan, Cheryl Eckert, Jennifer Guerrero, Jani Kleinbard, Amber Maher, and Patricia Pineda (ABC); The Oscars – Anthony Wilson, Barbara Cantu, Paula Ashby, Vickie Mynes, Yvonne Kupka, Gail Ryan, Iraina Crenshaw, and Luke O'Connor (ABC); The Voice: "Top 10" – Jerilynn Stephens, Amber Maher, Regina Rodriguez, Renee Ferruggia, Darbie Wieczorek, Cory Rotenberg, Danilo Dixon, and Robert Ramos (NBC)

=== Lighting Design / Lighting Direction ===
Lighting Design / Lighting Direction
| **Outstanding Lighting Design / Lighting Direction for a Variety Series**: **Saturday Night Live: "Host: John Mulaney" – Geoffrey Amoral, Richard McGuinness, William McGuinness, Tim Stasse, and Trevor Brown (NBC)**‡; America's Got Talent: "Live Results Finale" – Noah Mitz, Michael Berger, William Gossett, Ryan Tanker, Matt Benson, Scott Chmielewski, and Patrick Brazil (NBC); Jimmy Kimmel Live!: "Jimmy Kimmel Live in Brooklyn – Jason Alexander, Tracy Morgan, John Krasinski, Paul Shaffer, and Music from Kanye West" – Christian Hibbard, William Peets, Kille Knobel, and James Worman (ABC); So You Think You Can Dance: "Finale" – Robert Barnhart, Matt Firestone, Madigan Stehly, Patrick Boozer, and Pete Radice (Fox); The Voice: "Live Finale" – Oscar Dominguez, Daniel Boland, Craig Housenick, Samuel Barker, and Johnny Bradley (NBC) | **Outstanding Lighting Design / Lighting Direction for a Variety Special**: **Super Bowl LIV Halftime Show Starring Jennifer Lopez and Shakira – Robert Barnhart, David Grill, Pete Radice, Patrick Brazil, and Jason Rudolph (Fox)**‡; 62nd Grammy Awards – Robert Dickinson, Noah Mitz, Andy O'Reilly, Patrick Boozer, Madigan Stehly, William Gossett, Ryan Tanker, and Matthew Cotter (CBS); The Kennedy Center Honors – Robert Dickinson, Michael Berger, William Gossett, Bryan Klunder, Harry Sangmeister, and Jason Rudolph (CBS); The Oscars – Robert Dickinson, Noah Mitz, Michael Berger, Andy O'Reilly, Patrick Boozer, Ben Green, and Jason Rudolph (ABC); 73rd Annual Tony Awards – Robert Dickinson, Noah Mitz, Ed McCarthy, Harry Sangmeister, and Jason Rudolph (CBS) |

=== Main Title and Motion Design ===
Main Title and Motion Design
| **Outstanding Main Title Design**: **Godfather of Harlem – Mason Nicoll, Peter Pak, Giovana Pham, and Cisco Torres (Epix)**‡; Abstract: The Art of Design – Allie Fisher, Anthony Zazzi, and Brian Oakes (Netflix); Carnival Row – Lisa Bolan, Henry DeLeon, Mert Kizilay, Kaya Thomas, Yongsub Song, and Alex Silver (Prime Video); The Morning Show – Angus Wall, Hazel Baird, Emanuele Marani, EJ Kang, Peter Murphy, and Erik Righetti (Apple TV+); The Politician – Heidi Berg, Felix Soletic, Carlo Sa, Yongsub Song, Joe Paniagua, and Rachel Fowler (Netflix); Watchmen – Paul Mitchell, Olga Midlenko, Maciek Sokalski, Gabe Perez, and Benjamin Woodlock (HBO); Westworld – Patrick Clair, Pinar Yanadarg Delul, Raoul Marks, and Lance Slaton (HBO) | **Outstanding Motion Design (Juried)**: **Inside Bill's Brain: Decoding Bill Gates – Leanne Dare, Eben McCue, Sebastian Hoppe-Fuentes, and David Navas (Netflix)**‡ |

=== Makeup ===
Makeup
| **Outstanding Contemporary Makeup (Non-Prosthetic)**: **Euphoria: "And Salt the Earth Behind You" – Doniella Davy, Kirsten Sage Coleman, and Tara Lang Shah (HBO)**‡; Big Little Lies: "She Knows" – Michelle Radow, Erin Rosenmann, Karen Rentrop, Molly R. Stern, Angela Levin, Simone Almekias-Siegl, Miho Suzuki, and Claudia Humburg (HBO); The Handmaid's Tale: "Mayday" – Burton LeBlanc and Alastair Muir (Hulu); Ozark: "In Case of Emergency" – Tracy Ewell, Jillian Erickson, Jack Lazzaro, and Susan Reilly Lehane (Netflix); The Politician: "The Assassination of Payton Hobart" – Autumn Butler, Caitlin Martini Emery, Debra Schrey, and Emma Burton (Netflix); Schitt's Creek: "Happy Ending" – Candice Ornstein and Lucky Bromhead (Pop TV) | **Outstanding Period and/or Character Makeup (Non-Prosthetic)**: **The Marvelous Mrs. Maisel: "It's Comedy or Cabbage" – Patricia Regan, Claus Lulla, Joseph A. Campayno, Margot Boccia, Michael Laudati, Tomasina Smith, Roberto Baez, and Alberto Machuca (Prime Video)**‡; American Horror Story: 1984: "The Lady in White" – Carleigh Herbert, Abby Lyle Clawson, Mo Meinhart, and Lawrence Mercado (FX); Hollywood: "Outlaws" – Eryn Krueger Mekash, Kim Ayers, Kerrin Jackson, and Ana Gabriela Quinonez Urreg (Netflix); Pose: "Acting Up" – Sherri Berman Laurence, Nicky Pattison Illum, Chris Milone, Deja Smith, and Jessica Padilla (FX); Star Trek: Picard: "Stardust City Rag" – Silvina Knight, Robin Beauchesne, David Williams, Peter De Oliveira, and Natalie Thimm (CBS All Access) |
| **Outstanding Contemporary Makeup for a Variety, Nonfiction or Reality Program (Non-Prosthetic)**: **RuPaul's Drag Race: "I'm That Bitch" – Natasha Marcelina, David Petruschin, Jen Fregozo, and Nicole Faulkner (VH1)**‡; Dancing with the Stars: "Disney Night" – Zena Shteysel Green, Angela Moos, Patti Ramsey-Bortoli, Sarah Woolf, Julie Socash, Alison Gladieux, Donna Bard, and Nadege Schoenfeld (ABC); The Little Mermaid Live! – Bruce Grayson, Angela Moos, Jennifer Aspinall, Julie Socash, Valerie Hunt, Tym Buacharen, Jennifer Nigh, and Robin Beauchesne (ABC); The Oscars – Bruce Grayson, Angela Moos, Jill Cady, Peter De Oliveira, Zena Shteysel Green, Jennifer Aspinall, James MacKinnon, and Deborah Huss Humphries (ABC); The Voice: "Top 10" – Darcy Diana Gilmore, Kathleen Karridene, Alexis Walker, Nikki Carbonetta, Erin Guth, Gregory Arlt, Michelle DeMilt, and Gloria Elias-Foeillet (NBC) | **Outstanding Prosthetic Makeup for a Series, Limited Series, Movie or Special (Area)**: **Star Trek: Picard: "Absolute Candor" – James Mackinnon, Vincent Van Dyke, Richard Redlefsen, Alexei Dmitriew, Neville Page, and Michael Ornelaz (CBS All Access)**‡; American Horror Story: 1984: "True Killers" – Mike Mekash and Vincent Van Dyke (FX); Hollywood: "Jump" – Vincent Van Dyke, Cary Ayers, and Bruce Spaulding Fuller (Netflix); The Mandalorian: "Chapter 6: The Prisoner" – Brian Sipe, Alexei Dmitriew, Carlton Coleman, Samantha Ward, Scott Stoddard, Michael Ornelaz, Sabrina Castro, and Scott Patton (Disney+); Pose: "Love's in Need of Love Today" – David Presto, Greg Pikulski, Brett Schmidt, Lisa Forst, and Keith Palmer (FX); Westworld: "Crisis Theory" – Justin Raleigh, Chris Hampton, and Thom Floutz (HBO) |

=== Music ===
Music
| **Outstanding Music Composition for a Series (Original Dramatic Score)**: **The Mandalorian: "Chapter 8: Redemption" – Ludwig Göransson (Disney+)**‡; The Crown: "Aberfan" – Martin Phipps (Netflix); Euphoria: "Bonnie and Clyde" – Labrinth (HBO); Ozark: "All In" – Danny Bensi and Saunder Jurriaans (Netflix); Succession: "This Is Not for Tears" – Nicholas Britell (HBO) | **Outstanding Music Composition for a Limited Series, Movie or Special (Original Dramatic Score)**: **Watchmen: "It's Summer and We're Running Out of Ice" – Trent Reznor and Atticus Ross (HBO)**‡; Hollywood: "Hooray for Hollywood: Part 2" – Nathan Barr (Netflix); Little Fires Everywhere: "The Spider Web" – Mark Isham and Isabella Summers (Hulu); Mrs. America: "Reagan" – Kris Bowers (FX); Unorthodox: "Part 1" – Antonio Gambale (Netflix) |
| **Outstanding Music Composition for a Documentary Series or Special (Original Dramatic Score)**: **Why We Hate: "Tools & Tactics" – Laura Karpman (Discovery Channel)**‡; Becoming – Kamasi Washington (Netflix); Home: "Maine" – Amanda Jones (Apple TV+); McMillion$: "Episode 1" – Pinar Toprak and Alex Kovacs (HBO); Tiger King: Murder, Mayhem and Madness: "Not Your Average Joe" – Mark Mothersbaugh, John Enroth, and Albert Fox (Netflix) | **Outstanding Music Direction**: **The Kennedy Center Honors – Rickey Minor (CBS)**‡; Let's Go Crazy: The Grammy Salute to Prince – Sheila E., Jimmy Jam, and Terry Lewis (CBS); The Oscars – Rickey Minor (ABC); Saturday Night Live: "SNL at Home #1" – Lenny Pickett, Eli Brueggemann, and Leon Pendarvis (NBC); Super Bowl LIV Halftime Show Starring Jennifer Lopez and Shakira – Adam Wayne Blackstone (Fox) |
| **Outstanding Original Music and Lyrics**: **Euphoria: "And Salt the Earth Behind You" – "All for Us" by Labrinth (HBO)**‡; The Black Godfather – "Letter to My Godfather" by Pharrell Williams and Chad Hugo (Netflix); Last Week Tonight with John Oliver: "Episode 629" – "Eat Shit, Bob" by David Dabbon, Joanna Rothkopf, Jill Twiss, and Seena Vali (HBO); Little Fires Everywhere: "Find a Way" – "Build It Up" by Ingrid Michaelson (Hulu); The Marvelous Mrs. Maisel: "Strike Up the Band" – "One Less Angel" by Thomas Mizer and Curtis Moore (Prime Video); This Is Us: "Strangers" – "Memorized" by Siddhartha Khosla and Taylor Goldsmith (NBC); Watchmen: "This Extraordinary Being" – "The Way It Used to Be" by Trent Reznor and Atticus Ross (HBO) | **Outstanding Original Main Title Theme Music**: **Hollywood – Nathan Barr (Netflix)**‡; Carnival Row – Nathan Barr (Prime Video); Defending Jacob – Ólafur Arnalds (Apple TV+); Unorthodox – Antonio Gambale (Netflix); Why We Hate – Laura Karpman (Discovery Channel); Wu-Tang: An American Saga – RZA (Hulu) |
**Outstanding Music Supervision**: **The Marvelous Mrs. Maisel: "It's Comedy or Cabbage" – Robin Urdang, Amy Sherman-Palladino, and Daniel Palladino (Prime Video)**‡; Better Call Saul: "The Guy for This" – Thomas Golubić (AMC); Euphoria: "And Salt the Earth Behind You" – Jen Malone and Adam Leber (HBO); Insecure: "Lowkey Movin' On" – Kier Lehman (HBO); Killing Eve: "Meetings Have Biscuits" – Catherine Grieves and David Holmes (BBC America); Stranger Things: "Chapter Three: The Case of the Missing Lifeguard" – Nora Felder (Netflix); Watchmen: "This Extraordinary Being" – Liza Richardson (HBO)

=== Picture Editing ===
Picture Editing
| **Outstanding Single-Camera Picture Editing for a Drama Series**: **Succession: "This Is Not for Tears" – Bill Henry and Venya Bruk (HBO)**‡; The Mandalorian: "Chapter 2: The Child" – Andrew S. Eisen (Disney+); The Mandalorian: "Chapter 4: Sanctuary" – Dana E. Glauberman and Dylan Firshein (Disney+); The Mandalorian: "Chapter 8: Redemption" – Jeff Seibenick (Disney+); Ozark: "Fire Pink" – Vikash Patel (Netflix); Ozark: "Wartime" – Cindy Mollo (Netflix); Stranger Things: "Chapter Eight: The Battle of Starcourt" – Dean Zimmerman and Katheryn Naranjo (Netflix); Succession: "DC" – Ken Eluto (HBO) | **Outstanding Single-Camera Picture Editing for a Comedy Series**: **Insecure: "Lowkey Trying" – Nena Erb and Lynarion Hubbard (HBO)**‡; Curb Your Enthusiasm: "Elizabeth, Margaret and Larry" – Steve Rasch (HBO); The Marvelous Mrs. Maisel: "A Jewish Girl Walks Into the Apollo..." – Kate Sanford and Tim Streeto (Prime Video); Schitt's Creek: "Happy Ending" – Trevor Ambrose (Pop TV); Schitt's Creek: "Start Spreading the News" – Paul Winestock (Pop TV); What We Do in the Shadows: "Resurrection" – Yana Gorskaya and Dane McMaster (FX) |
| **Outstanding Multi-Camera Picture Editing for a Comedy Series**: **One Day at a Time: "Boundaries" – Cheryl Campsmith (Pop TV)**‡; The Conners: "Slappy Holidays" – Brian Schnuckel (ABC); Will & Grace: "We Love Lucy" – Peter Beyt (NBC); Will & Grace: "What a Dump" – Joseph Fulton (NBC) | **Outstanding Single-Camera Picture Editing for a Limited Series or Movie**: **Watchmen: "A God Walks into Abar" – Henk Van Eeghen (HBO)**‡; El Camino: A Breaking Bad Movie – Skip Macdonald (Netflix); Mrs. America: "Phyllis" – Robert Komatsu (FX); Watchmen: "It's Summer and We're Running Out of Ice" – David Eisenberg (HBO); Watchmen: "This Extraordinary Being" – Anna Hauger (HBO) |
| **Outstanding Picture Editing for Variety Programming (Area)**: **Last Week Tonight with John Oliver: "Eat Shit Bob!" – Ryan Barger (HBO)**‡; The Daily Show with Trevor Noah: "Trump's Coronavirus Address (Bloopers Included) and Trevor's Audience Tribute Song" – Mike Choi, Tom Favilla, Nikolai Johnson, Mark Paone, Erin Shannon, Catherine Trasborg, Einar Westerlund, and Robert York (Comedy Central); Dave Chappelle: Sticks & Stones – Jeff U'Ren (Netflix); Dave Chappelle: The Kennedy Center Mark Twain Prize for American Humor – Brad Gilson, Chester G. Contaoi, Jon Alloway, Pi Ware, and Brian Forbes (PBS); Last Week Tonight with John Oliver: "The Journey of ChiiJohn: Chapter 2" – Anthony Miale (HBO) | **Outstanding Picture Editing for a Nonfiction Program**: **Apollo 11 – Todd Douglas Miller (CNN)**‡; American Factory – Lindsay Utz (Netflix); Beastie Boys Story – Jeff Buchanan and Zoe Schack (Apple TV+); The Last Dance: "Episode 1" – Chad Beck, Devin Concannon, Abhay Sofsky, and Ben Sozanski (ESPN); McMillion$: "Episode 3" – Jody McVeigh-Schultz, Lane Farnham, James Lee Hernandez, Brian Lazarte, and Scott Hanson (HBO); Tiger King: Murder, Mayhem and Madness: "Cult of Personality" – Doug Abel, Nicholas Biagetti, Dylan Hansen-Fliedner, Geoffrey Richman, and Daniel Koehler (Netflix) |
| **Outstanding Picture Editing for a Structured Reality or Competition Program**: **RuPaul's Drag Race: "I'm That Bitch" – Jamie Martin, Michael Roha, Paul Cross, Michael Lynn Deis, and Ryan Mallick (VH1)**‡; LEGO Masters: "Mega City Block" – Samantha Diamond, Dan Hancox, Karl Kimbrough, Ian Kaufman, Kevin Benson, Josh Young, and Jon Bilicki (Fox); Queer Eye: "Disabled but Not Really" – Ryan Taylor and Tony Zajkowski (Netflix); Survivor: "It's Like a Survivor Economy" – Michael Greer, Chad Bertalotto, Evan Mediuch, James Ciccarello, and Jacob Teixeira (CBS); Top Chef: "The Jonathan Gold Standard" – Matt Reynolds, David Chalfin, Mike Abitz, Eric Lambert, Jose Rodriguez, and Dan Williams (Bravo) | **Outstanding Picture Editing for an Unstructured Reality Program**: **Cheer: "God Blessed Texas" – Arielle Kilker, David Nordstrom, Kate Hackett, Daniel McDonald, Mark Morgan, Sharon Weaver, and Ted Woerner (Netflix)**‡; Deadliest Catch: "Cold War Rivals" – Rob Butler, Isaiah Camp, Ben Bulatao, Joe Mikan, Ralf Melville, and Alexandra Moore (Discovery Channel); Life Below Zero: "The New World" – Matt Edwards, Jennifer Nelson, Tony Diaz, Matt Mercer, Eric Michael Schrader, and Michael Swingler (National Geographic); RuPaul's Drag Race: Untucked: "The Ball Ball" – Kendra Pasker, Yali Sharon, and Kate Smith (VH1) |

=== Sound Editing ===
Sound Editing
| **Outstanding Sound Editing for a Comedy or Drama Series (One Hour)**: **Stranger Things: "Chapter Eight: The Battle of Starcourt" – Craig Henighan, William Files, Ryan Cole, Kerry Dean Williams, Angelo Palazzo, Katie Halliday, David Klotz, and Steve Baine (Netflix)**‡; Better Call Saul: "Bagman" – Nick Forshager, Kathryn Madsen, Matt Temple, Todd Toon, Jeff Cranford, Jane Boegel-Koch, Jason Tregoe Newman, Gregg Barbanell, and Alex Ullrich (AMC); The Boys: "The Name of the Game" – Wade Barnett, David Barbee, Mason Kopeikin, Brian Dunlop, Ryan Briley, Chris Newlin, Christopher Brooks, Joseph T. Sabella, and Jesi Ruppel (Prime Video); The Crown: "Aberfan" – Lee Walpole, Andy Kennedy, Saoirse Christopherson, Juraj Mravec, Tom Williams, Steve Little, Tom Stewart, Anna Wright, Catherine Thomas, and Lindsay Wright (Netflix); Star Trek: Picard: "Et in Arcadia Ego: Part 2" – Matthew E. Taylor, Tim Farrell, Harry Cohen, Michael Schapiro, Sean Heissinger, Clay Weber, Darrin Mann, Moira Marquis, Stan Jones, Alyson Dee Moore, and Chris Moriana (CBS All Access); Westworld: "Parce Domine" – Sue Gamsaragan Cahill, Benjamin L. Cook, Shaughnessy Hare, Jane Boegel-Koch, Tim Tuchrello, Sara Bencivenga, Brendan Croxon, Adrian Medhurst, and Christopher Kaller (HBO) | **Outstanding Sound Editing for a Comedy or Drama Series (Half-Hour) and Animation**: **The Mandalorian: "Chapter 1: The Mandalorian" – David Acord, Matthew Wood, Bonnie Wild, James Spencer, Richard Quinn, Richard Gould, Stephanie McNally, Ryan Rubin, Ronni Brown, and Jana Vance (Disney+)**‡; GLOW: "The Libertines" – Robb Navrides, Colette Dahanne, Jason Lezama, David Beadle, Jason Krane, Larry Hopkins, Emily Kwong, Lindsay Pepper, and Zane Bruce (Netflix); Silicon Valley: "Exit Event" – Bobby Mackston, Sean Garnhart, Ryan Gierke, Joe Deveau, and Vincent Guisetti (HBO); Space Force: "The Launch" – Bobby Mackston, Paul Hammond, Sean Garnhart, Vincent Guisetti, Jason Tregoe Newman, Tessa Phillips, Aran Tanchum, and Alfredo Douglas (Netflix); What We Do in the Shadows: "The Return" – Steffan Falesitch, David Barbee, Angelina Faulkner, Steve Griffen, Sam C. Lewis, John Guentner, and Ellen Heuer (FX) |
| **Outstanding Sound Editing for a Limited Series, Movie or Special**: **Watchmen: "This Extraordinary Being" – Brad North, Harry Cohen, Jordan Wilby, Tiffany S. Griffith, Antony Zeller, AJ Shapiro, Sally Boldt, Zane Bruce, and Lindsay Pepper (HBO)**‡; American Horror Story: 1984: "Camp Redwood" – Gary Megregian, Timothy A. Cleveland, Zheng Jia, Naaman Haynes, Patrick Hogan, Sam Munoz, David Klotz, and Noel Vought (FX); Catherine the Great: "Episode Four" – Jim Goddard, Craig Butters, Duncan Price, Matthew Mewett, Andrew Glen, Anna Wright, Catherine Thomas, and Philip Clements (HBO); Devs: "Episode 3" – Glenn Freemantle, Ben Barker, Gillian Dodders, James Wichall, Danny Freemantle, Robert Malone, Dayo James, Nicholas Freemantle, Lilly Blazewicz, Emilie O'Connor, Zoe Freed, and Peter Burgis (FX); El Camino: A Breaking Bad Movie – Nick Forshager, Todd Toon, Kathryn Madsen, Jane Boegel-Koch, Luke Gibleon, Jason Tregoe Newman, Bryant J. Fuhrmann, Jeff Cranford, Gregg Barbanell, and Alex Ullrich (Netflix) | **Outstanding Sound Editing for a Nonfiction or Reality Program (Single or Multi-Camera)**: **Apollo 11 – Eric Milano (CNN)**‡; Beastie Boys Story – Martyn Zub, Paul Aulicino, and Pernell Salina (Apple TV+); Cheer: "Daytona" – Logan Byers, Kaleb Klingler, and Sean Gray (Netflix); Laurel Canyon: A Place in Time – Jonathan Greber and Lucas Miller (Epix); McMillion$: "Episode 1" – Ben Freer, Jordan Meltzer, and Jody McVeigh-Schultz (HBO); Tiger King: Murder, Mayhem and Madness: "Cult of Personality" – Ian Cymore, Rachel Wardell, and Steve Griffen (Netflix) |

=== Sound Mixing ===
Sound Mixing
| **Outstanding Sound Mixing for a Comedy or Drama Series (One Hour)**: **The Marvelous Mrs. Maisel: "A Jewish Girl Walks Into the Apollo..." – Mathew Price, Ron Bochar, George A. Lara, and David Boulton (Prime Video)**‡; Better Call Saul: "Bagman" – Phillip W. Palmer, Larry Benjamin, and Kevin Valentine (AMC); Ozark: "All In" – Felipe "Flip" Borrero, Larry Benjamin, Kevin Valentine, and Phil McGowan (Netflix); Star Trek: Picard: "Et in Arcadia Ego: Part 2" – Peter J. Devlin, Todd M. Grace, Edward C. Carr III, and Michael Perfitt (CBS All Access); Stranger Things: "Chapter Eight: The Battle of Starcourt" – Michael Rayle, Mark Paterson, William Files, and Craig Henighan (Netflix); Westworld: "Parce Domine" – Geoffrey Patterson, Keith Rogers, and Benjamin L. Cook (HBO) | **Outstanding Sound Mixing for a Limited Series or Movie**: **Watchmen: "This Extraordinary Being" – Douglas Axtell, Joe DeAngelis, and Chris Carpenter (HBO)**‡; American Horror Story: 1984: "Camp Redwood" – Alex Altman, Joe Earle, Doug Andham, and Judah Getz (FX); Devs: "Episode 3" – Lisa Piñero, Mitch Low, Howard Bargroff, and Glen Gathard (FX); El Camino: A Breaking Bad Movie – Phillip W. Palmer, Larry Benjamin, Kevin Valentine, and Stacey Michaels (Netflix); Hollywood: "Hooray for Hollywood" – John Bauman, Joe Earle, Doug Andham, and Bob Lacivita (Netflix) |
| **Outstanding Sound Mixing for a Comedy or Drama Series (Half-Hour) and Animation (Area)**: **The Mandalorian: "Chapter 2: The Child" – Shawn Holden, Bonnie Wild, and Chris Fogel (Disney+)**‡; Modern Family: "Finale Part 1" – Stephen Tibbo, Srdjan Popovic, Brian R. Harman, Peter Bawiec, and Dean Okrand (ABC); The Ranch: "Fadeaway" – Laura L. King, Bob LaMasney, Kathy Oldham, and Ryan Kennedy (Netflix); Schitt's Creek: "Happy Ending" – Bryan Day and Martin Lee (Pop TV); Space Force: "Save Epsilon 6!" – Ben Patrick, John W. Cook II, and Bill Freesh (Netflix) | **Outstanding Sound Mixing for a Variety Series or Special (Area)**: **The Oscars – Paul Sandweiss, Tommy Vicari, Biff Dawes, Pablo Munguia, Kristian Pedregon, Patrick Baltzell, Michael Parker, Christian Schrader, John Perez, Marc Repp, and Thomas Pesa (ABC)**‡; The Daily Show with Trevor Noah: "Jessie Reyez" – Tim Lester and Patrick Weaver (Comedy Central); Dave Chappelle: Sticks & Stones – Brian Riordan, Conner Moore, and Michael Abbott (Netflix); 62nd Grammy Awards – Thomas Holmes, Mikael Stewart, John Harris, Eric Schilling, Ron Reaves, Thomas Pesa, Michael Parker, Eric Johnston, Pablo Munguia, Juan Pablo Velasco, Bob LaMasney, Josh Morton, Kristian Pedregon, and Paul Sandweiss (CBS); Last Week Tonight with John Oliver: "Episode 629" – Steven Watson, Charlie Jones, John Kilgore, Steve Lettie, Paul Special, Tony Rollins, Dave Swanson, and Jayson Dyer Sainsbury (HBO) |
**Outstanding Sound Mixing for a Nonfiction or Reality Program (Single or Multi-Camera) (Area)**: **Apollo 11 – Eric Milano (CNN)**‡; Beastie Boys Story – William Tzouris, Jacob Feinberg, and Martyn Zub (Apple TV+); Cheer: "Daytona" – Ryan David Adams (Netflix); Laurel Canyon: A Place in Time – Gary A. Rizzo, Stephen Urata, Danielle Dupre, and Tony Villaflor (Epix); RuPaul's Drag Race: "I'm That Bitch" – Glenn Gaines, Ryan Brady, Erik Valenzuela, and Sal Ojeda (VH1); Tiger King: Murder, Mayhem and Madness: "The Noble Thing to Do" – Jose Araujo, Royce Sharp, Jack Neu, and Ian Cymore (Netflix)

=== Special Visual Effects ===
Special Visual Effects
| **Outstanding Special Visual Effects**: **The Mandalorian: "Chapter 2: The Child" – Richard Bluff, Jason Porter, Abbigail Keller, Hayden Jones, Hal Hickel, Roy Cancino, John Rosengrant, Enrico Damm, and Landis Fields (Disney+)**‡; Lost in Space: "Ninety-Seven" – Jabbar Raisani, Terron Pratt, Marion Spates, Niklas Jacobson, Andrew Walker, Juri Stanossek, Dirk Valk, Blaine Lougheed, and Paul Benjamin (Netflix); Stranger Things: "Chapter Eight: The Battle of Starcourt" – Paul Graff, Gayle Busby, Tom Ford, Michael Maher Jr., Martin Pelletier, Berter Orpak, Yvon Jardel, Nathan Arbuckle, and Caius Man (Netflix); Watchmen: "See How They Fly" – Erik Henry, Matt Robken, Ashley J. Ward, David Fletcher, Mathieu Raynault, Bobo Skipper, Ahmed Gharraph, Emanuel Fuchs, and Francois Lambert (HBO); Westworld: "Crisis Theory" – Jay Worth, Martin Hernblad, Jeremy Fernsler, Nhat Phong Tran, Joe Wehmeyer, Mark Byers, Bruce Branit, Octevia Robertson, and Jacqueline VandenBussche (HBO) | **Outstanding Special Visual Effects in a Supporting Role**: **Vikings: "The Best Laid Plans" – Dominic Remane, Bill Halliday, Becca Donohue, Leann Harvey, Tom Morrison, Ovidiu Cinazan, Jim Maxwell, Ezra Waddell, and Warren Lawtey (History)**‡; Devs: "Episode 8" – Andrew Whitehurst, Sarah Tulloch, Anne Akande, Samantha Townend, Giacomo Mineo, Tom Hales, George Kyparissous, Stafford Lawrence, and Jon Uriarte; The Handmaid's Tale: "Household" – Stephen Lebed, Brendan Taylor, Leo Bovell, Rob Greb, Gwen Zhang, Marlis Coto, Stephen Wagner, Josh Clark, and James Minett (Hulu); Tales from the Loop: "Loop" – Andrea Knoll, Ashley Bernes, Eduardo Anton, Julien Hery, Laurent Pancaccini, Andrew Kowbell, Alan Scott, David Piombino, and Rajesh Kaushik (Prime Video); Tom Clancy's Jack Ryan: "Strongman" – Erik Henry, Juliette Yager, Peter Crosman, Pau Costa Moeller, Paige Prokop, Deak Ferrand, Francois Lambert, Jesper Kjolsrud, and Richard Vosper-Carey (Prime Video) |

=== Stunt Coordination ===
Stunt Coordination
| **Outstanding Stunt Coordination for a Comedy Series or Variety Program**: **Shameless – Eddie Perez (Showtime)**‡; Ballers – Jeff Barnett (HBO); Brooklyn Nine-Nine – Norman Howell (NBC); Henry Danger – Vince Deadrick Jr. (Nickelodeon); Space Force – Erik Solky (Netflix) | **Outstanding Stunt Coordination for a Drama Series, Limited Series or Movie**: **The Mandalorian – Ryan Watson (Disney+)**‡; The Blacklist – Cort L. Hessler III (NBC); The Rookie – David Rowden Sr. (ABC); Stranger Things – Hiro Koda (Netflix); S.W.A.T. – Charlie Brewer and Austen Brewer (CBS) |

=== Technical Direction ===
Technical Direction
| **Outstanding Technical Direction, Camerawork, Video Control for a Series (Area)**: **Last Week Tonight with John Oliver: "Episode 629" – Dave Saretsky, Augie Yuson, Dante Pagano, John Harrison, Rob Balton, Tim Quigley, Phil Salanto, Rich Freedman, Joe Debonis, Michael Hauer, Lucas Owen, Scotty Buckler, and Russell Swanson (HBO)**‡; Curb Your Enthusiasm: "The Spite Store" – Jon Purdy, Patrik Thelander, Parker Tolifson, and Ric Griffith (HBO); Jimmy Kimmel Live!: "Jimmy Kimmel Live in Brooklyn – Jon Stewart, Benedict Cumberbatch, Kelly Ripa, and Music from David Byrne" – Ervin D. Hurd Jr., Guy Jones, Parker Bartlett, Greg Grouwinkel, Garrett Hurt, Kris Wilson, Mark Gonzales, Nick Gomez, Bernd Reinhardt, Damien Tuffereau, and Steve Garrett (ABC); Saturday Night Live: "Host: Woody Harrelson" – Steven Cimino, Frank Grisanti, Ted Natoli, John Pinto, Paul Cangialosi, Len Wechsler, Dave Driscoll, Eric A. Eisenstein, Dante Pagano (NBC); The Voice: "Live Finale" – Allan Wells, Terrance Ho, Diane Biederbeck, Danny Bonilla, Mano Bonilla III, Robert Burnette, Suzanne Ebner, Guido Frenzel, Alex Hernandez, Cory Hunter, Marc Hunter, Scott Hylton, Kathrine Iacofano, Scott Kaye, Steve Martyniuk, Jofre Rosero, and Steve Simmons (NBC) | **Outstanding Technical Direction, Camerawork, Video Control for a Special**: **Live in Front of a Studio Audience: "All in the Family" and "Good Times" – Eric Becker, Kevin Faust, Ron Hirshman, Ed Horton, Helena Jackson, Jon Purdy, Jimmy Velarde, Allen Merriweather, Greg Grouwinkel, Randy Gomez Sr., and Andrew Ansnick (ABC)**‡; 2019 American Music Awards – Eric Becker, John Pritchett, Guy Jones, Wes Steinberg, Joe Bohman, Ralph Bolton, Danny Bonilla, David Carline, Suzanne Ebner, Garrett Hurt, Brian Lataille, David Levisohn, Tore Livia, Steve Martyniuk, Allen Merriweather, EJ "Sketch" Pasinski, Rob Pittman, David Plakos, John Pry, Steve Thiel, Rob Vuona, Dan Webb, and Easter Xua (ABC); Dave Chappelle: Sticks & Stones – Jon Pretnar, Ruben Avendano, Daniel Balton, Mano Bonilla, Eli Clarke, Helene Haviland, Ed Horton, Lyn Noland, JR Reid, and Ronald N. Travisano (Netflix); The Little Mermaid Live! – Iqbal Hans, Rod Wardell, Emelie Scaminaci, Michael Maiatico, Damien Tuffereau, Nathanial Havholm, Freddy Frederick, Tore Livia, Jofre Rosero, Easter Xua, David Plakos, Patrick Gleason, Keyan Safyari, and David Eastwood (ABC); The Oscars – Eric Becker, John Pritchett, Kenneth Shapiro, Terrance Ho, Mark Sanford, Guy Jones, Robert Del Russo, David Eastwood, David Carline, Suzanne Ebner, Jay Kulick, Dan Webb, Shaun Harkins, Garrett Hurt, Tore Livia, Allen Merriweather, Lyn Noland, Freddy Fredericks, George Prince, Ralph Bolton, Rob Palmer, David Plakos, Easter Xua, Rob Balton, and Danny Bonilla (ABC) |

=== Writing ===
Writing
| **Outstanding Writing for a Variety Series**: **Last Week Tonight with John Oliver – Dan Gurewitch, Jeff Maurer, Jill Twiss, Juli Weiner, John Oliver, Tim Carvell, Daniel O'Brien, Owen Parsons, Charlie Redd, Joanna Rothkopf, Ben Silva, and Seena Vali (HBO)**‡; The Daily Show with Trevor Noah – Dan Amira, Lauren Sarver Means, Daniel Radosh, David Angelo, Devin Delliquanti, Zach DiLanzo, Geoff Haggerty, Josh Johnson, David Kibuuka, Matt Koff, X Mayo, Christiana Mbakwe, Dan McCoy, Trevor Noah, Joseph Opio, Randall Otis, Zhubin Parang, Kat Radley, and Scott Sherman (Comedy Central); Full Frontal with Samantha Bee – Samantha Bee, Pat Cassels, Kristen Bartlett, Mike Drucker, Melinda Taub, Nicole Silverberg, Joe Grossman, Sean Crespo, Mathan Erhardt, Miles Kahn, Sahar Rizvi, and Alison Zeidman (TBS); Late Night with Seth Meyers – Alex Baze, Jermaine Affonso, Karen Chee, Bryan Donaldson, Sal Gentile, Matt Goldich, Dina Gusovsky, Jenny Hagel, Allison Hord, Mike Karnell, John Lutz, Seth Meyers, Ian Morgan, Seth Reiss, Amber Ruffin, Mike Scollins, Mike Shoemaker, and Ben Warheit (NBC); The Late Show with Stephen Colbert – Ariel Dumas, Jay Katsir, Stephen Colbert, Michael Brumm, River Clegg, Aaron Cohen, Nicole Conlan, Paul Dinello, Glenn Eichler, Django Gold, Gabe Gronli, Barry Julien, Daniel Kibblesmith, Eliana Kwartler, Matt Lappin, Felipe Torres Medina, Opus Moreschi, Asher Perlman, Tom Purcell, Kate Sidley, Brian Stack, John Thibodeaux, and Steve Waltien (CBS) | **Outstanding Writing for a Variety Special**: **Dave Chappelle: Sticks & Stones – Dave Chappelle (Netflix)**‡; Hannah Gadsby: Douglas – Hannah Gadsby (Netflix); John Mulaney & the Sack Lunch Bunch – John Mulaney and Marika Sawyer (Netflix); Patton Oswalt: I Love Everything – Patton Oswalt (Netflix); Seth Meyers: Lobby Baby – Seth Meyers (Netflix) |
**Outstanding Writing for a Nonfiction Program**: Don't F**k with Cats: Hunting an Internet Killer: "Closing the Net" – Mark Lewis (Netflix)‡; Beastie Boys Story – Mike Diamond, Adam Horovitz, and Spike Jonze (Apple TV+); The Cave – Alisar Hasan and Feras Fayyad (National Geographic); Circus of Books – Rachel Mason and Kathryn Robson (Netflix); McMillion$: "Episode 1" – James Lee Hernandez and Brian Lazarte (HBO)

=== Nominations and wins by program ===
For the purposes of the lists below, any wins in juried categories are assumed to have a prior nomination.

Shows with multiple Creative Arts nominations
| Nominations | Show | Network |
|---|---|---|
| 15 | Watchmen | HBO |
| 14 | The Mandalorian | Disney+ |
| 12 | The Marvelous Mrs. Maisel | Prime Video |
| 12 | Saturday Night Live | NBC |
| 9 | The Oscars | ABC |
| 9 | Ozark | Netflix |
| 9 | RuPaul's Drag Race | VH1 |
| 9 | Westworld | HBO |
| 8 | Hollywood | Netflix |
| 8 | Last Week Tonight with John Oliver | HBO |
| 8 | Succession | HBO |
| 7 | The Crown | Netflix |
| 7 | The Handmaid's Tale | Hulu |
| 7 | Queer Eye | Netflix |
| 7 | Schitt's Creek | Pop TV |
| 7 | Stranger Things | Netflix |
| 6 | Cheer | Netflix |
| 6 | Dave Chappelle: Sticks & Stones | Netflix |
| 6 | Tiger King: Murder, Mayhem and Madness | Netflix |
| 5 | Apollo 11 | CNN |
| 5 | Beastie Boys Story | Apple TV+ |
| 5 | Euphoria | HBO |
| 5 | Insecure | HBO |
| 5 | McMillion$ | HBO |
| 5 | The Politician | Netflix |
| 5 | Star Trek: Picard | CBS All Access |
| 5 | The Voice | NBC |
| 4 | American Horror Story: 1984 | FX |
| 4 | Becoming | Netflix |
| 4 | The Cave | National Geographic |
| 4 | The Daily Show with Trevor Noah | Comedy Central |
| 4 | Devs | FX |
| 4 | El Camino: A Breaking Bad Movie | Netflix |
| 4 | 62nd Grammy Awards | CBS |
| 4 | Killing Eve | BBC America |
| 4 | Live in Front of a Studio Audience: "All in the Family" and "Good Times" | ABC |
| 4 | Mrs. America | FX |
| 4 | Pose | FX |
| 4 | Space Force | Netflix |
| 4 | Super Bowl LIV Halftime Show Starring Jennifer Lopez and Shakira | Fox |
| 4 | This Is Us | NBC |
| 4 | Unorthodox | Netflix |
| 4 | What We Do in the Shadows | FX |
| 4 | Will & Grace | NBC |
| 3 | American Factory | Netflix |
| 3 | Better Call Saul | AMC |
| 3 | Big Little Lies | HBO |
| 3 | A Black Lady Sketch Show | HBO |
| 3 | Carnival Row | Prime Video |
| 3 | Curb Your Enthusiasm | HBO |
| 3 | Dancing with the Stars | ABC |
| 3 | Drunk History | Comedy Central |
| 3 | #FreeRayshawn | Quibi |
| 3 | Genndy Tartakovsky's Primal | Adult Swim |
| 3 | The Last Dance | ESPN |
| 3 | Laurel Canyon: A Place in Time | Epix |
| 3 | The Little Mermaid Live! | ABC |
| 3 | The Morning Show | Apple TV+ |
| 3 | The Simpsons | Fox |
| 3 | So You Think You Can Dance | Fox |
| 3 | 73rd Annual Tony Awards | CBS |
| 3 | Top Chef | Bravo |
| 2 | Big Mouth | Netflix |
| 2 | Black-ish | ABC |
| 2 | Dave Chappelle: The Kennedy Center Mark Twain Prize for American Humor | PBS |
| 2 | Defending Jacob | Apple TV+ |
| 2 | GLOW | Netflix |
| 2 | 77th Annual Golden Globe Awards | NBC |
| 2 | Grace and Frankie | Netflix |
| 2 | Hannah Gadsby: Douglas | Netflix |
| 2 | Jimmy Kimmel Live! | ABC |
| 2 | John Mulaney & the Sack Lunch Bunch | Netflix |
| 2 | The Kennedy Center Honors | CBS |
| 2 | The Late Show with Stephen Colbert | CBS |
| 2 | LEGO Masters | Fox |
| 2 | Life Below Zero | National Geographic |
| 2 | Little Fires Everywhere | Hulu |
| 2 | Love Is Blind | Netflix |
| 2 | Modern Family | ABC |
| 2 | Most Dangerous Game | Quibi |
| 2 | The Ranch | Netflix |
| 2 | Reno 911! | Quibi |
| 2 | RuPaul's Drag Race: Untucked | VH1 |
| 2 | Serengeti | Discovery Channel |
| 2 | Shark Tank | ABC |
| 2 | Survivor | CBS |
| 2 | Tales from the Loop | Prime Video |
| 2 | Why We Hate | Discovery Channel |

Shows with multiple Creative Arts wins
| Wins | Show | Network |
|---|---|---|
| 7 | The Mandalorian | Disney+ |
| 7 | Watchmen | HBO |
| 6 | Saturday Night Live | NBC |
| 5 | RuPaul's Drag Race | VH1 |
| 4 | The Marvelous Mrs. Maisel | Prime Video |
| 3 | Apollo 11 | CNN |
| 3 | Cheer | Netflix |
| 3 | Dave Chappelle: Sticks & Stones | Netflix |
| 3 | Genndy Tartakovsky's Primal | Adult Swim |
| 3 | Last Week Tonight with John Oliver | HBO |
| 3 | Succession | HBO |
| 2 | The Cave | National Geographic |
| 2 | The Crown | Netflix |
| 2 | Euphoria | HBO |
| 2 | #FreeRayshawn | Quibi |
| 2 | Hollywood | Netflix |
| 2 | Live in Front of a Studio Audience: "All in the Family" and "Good Times" | ABC |
| 2 | The Oscars | ABC |
| 2 | Schitt's Creek | Pop TV |

=== Nominations and wins by network ===
Networks with multiple Creative Arts nominations
| Nominations | Network |
|---|---|
| 124 | Netflix |
| 74 | HBO |
| 36 | NBC |
| 31 | ABC |
| 23 | Prime Video |
| 22 | CBS/CBS All Access |
| 22 | FX/FX on Hulu |
| 18 | Disney+ |
| 14 | Fox |
| 13 | Apple TV+ |
| 12 | Hulu |
| 12 | VH1 |
| 10 | Quibi |
| 9 | Comedy Central |
| 9 | National Geographic |
| 8 | Pop TV |
| 6 | BBC America |
| 5 | Adult Swim |
| 5 | CNN |
| 5 | Discovery Channel |
| 5 | PBS |
| 4 | AMC |
| 4 | Epix |
| 4 | Oculus |
| 4 | YouTube |
| 3 | Bravo |
| 3 | ESPN |
| 3 | TBS |
| 2 | A&E |
| 2 | History |
| 2 | Showtime |

Networks with multiple Creative Arts wins
| Wins | Network |
|---|---|
| 19 | HBO |
| 19 | Netflix |
| 8 | Disney+ |
| 8 | NBC |
| 5 | ABC |
| 5 | National Geographic |
| 5 | VH1 |
| 4 | Adult Swim |
| 4 | Prime Video |
| 3 | CNN |
| 3 | Fox |
| 3 | Pop TV |
| 2 | CBS/CBS All Access |
| 2 | Quibi |

== Ceremony order and presenters ==
The following categories were presented at each ceremony:

Monday, September 14
| Category | Presenter |
|---|---|
| Outstanding Short Form Nonfiction or Reality Series | Jim Gaffigan; Jeannie Gaffigan |
| Outstanding Casting for a Reality Program | Jim Gaffigan; Jeannie Gaffigan |
| Outstanding Sound Mixing for a Nonfiction or Reality Program (Single or Multi-Camera) | Drew Scott |
| Outstanding Sound Editing for a Nonfiction or Reality Program (Single or Multi-Camera) | Drew Scott |
| Outstanding Music Composition for a Documentary Series or Special (Original Dramatic Score) | Drew Scott |
| Outstanding Cinematography for a Nonfiction Program | Daryl Mitchell |
| Outstanding Cinematography for a Reality Program | Daryl Mitchell |
| Outstanding Writing for a Nonfiction Program | Rob Riggle |
| Outstanding Directing for a Documentary/Nonfiction Program | Rob Riggle |
| Outstanding Narrator | Rob Riggle |
| Outstanding Picture Editing for an Unstructured Reality Program | Gina Carano |
| Outstanding Picture Editing for a Nonfiction Program | Gina Carano |
| Outstanding Picture Editing for a Structured Reality or Competition Program | Gina Carano |
| Outstanding Hosted Nonfiction Series or Special | RuPaul |
| Outstanding Documentary or Nonfiction Special | RuPaul |
| Outstanding Directing for a Reality Program | J. B. Smoove |
| Outstanding Structured Reality Program | J. B. Smoove |

Tuesday, September 15
| Category | Presenter |
|---|---|
| Outstanding Music Direction | Issa Rae |
| Outstanding Short Form Variety Series | Issa Rae |
| Outstanding Costumes for a Variety, Nonfiction or Reality Program | Desus Nice; The Kid Mero |
| Outstanding Contemporary Hairstyling for a Variety, Nonfiction or Reality Program | Desus Nice; The Kid Mero |
| Outstanding Contemporary Makeup for a Variety, Nonfiction or Reality Program (Non-Prosthetic) | Desus Nice; The Kid Mero |
| Outstanding Writing for a Variety Series | Thomas Lennon |
| Outstanding Directing for a Variety Series | Thomas Lennon |
| Outstanding Lighting Design / Lighting Direction for a Variety Special | Jeremy Pope |
| Outstanding Picture Editing for Variety Programming | Jeremy Pope |
| Outstanding Sound Mixing for a Variety Series or Special | Jeremy Pope |
| Outstanding Technical Direction, Camerawork, Video Control for a Special | Sofia Hublitz |
| Outstanding Technical Direction, Camerawork, Video Control for a Series | Sofia Hublitz |
| Outstanding Production Design for a Variety, Reality or Competition Series | Josh Flagg; Tracy Tutor |
| Outstanding Production Design for a Variety Special | Josh Flagg; Tracy Tutor |
| Outstanding Variety Sketch Series | Chris Hardwick |
| Outstanding Variety Special (Live) | Chris Hardwick |

Wednesday, September 16
| Category | Presenter |
|---|---|
| Outstanding Special Visual Effects | Hilarie Burton; Jeffrey Dean Morgan |
| Outstanding Special Visual Effects in a Supporting Role | Hilarie Burton; Jeffrey Dean Morgan |
| Outstanding Cinematography for a Limited Series or Movie | Monica Raymund |
| Outstanding Cinematography for a Multi-Camera Series | Monica Raymund |
| Outstanding Cinematography for a Single-Camera Series (Half-Hour) | Monica Raymund |
| Outstanding Contemporary Hairstyling | Rose Byrne; Bobby Cannavale |
| Outstanding Period and/or Character Makeup (Non-Prosthetic) | Rose Byrne; Bobby Cannavale |
| Outstanding Prosthetic Makeup for a Series, Limited Series, Movie or Special | Rose Byrne; Bobby Cannavale |
| Outstanding Fantasy/Sci-Fi Costumes | Brandee Evans |
| Outstanding Period Costumes | Brandee Evans |
| Outstanding Multi-Camera Picture Editing for a Comedy Series | Giancarlo Esposito |
| Outstanding Single-Camera Picture Editing for a Drama Series | Giancarlo Esposito |
| Outstanding Single-Camera Picture Editing for a Limited Series or Movie | Giancarlo Esposito |
| Outstanding Sound Mixing for a Comedy or Drama Series (Half-Hour) and Animation | John Hodgman |
| Outstanding Sound Mixing for a Limited Series or Movie | John Hodgman |
| Outstanding Sound Editing for a Comedy or Drama Series (One Hour) | Laverne Cox |
| Outstanding Sound Editing for a Comedy or Drama Series (Half-Hour) and Animation | Laverne Cox |
| Outstanding Production Design for a Narrative Program (Half-Hour) | Justin H. Min |
| Outstanding Production Design for a Narrative Contemporary Program (One Hour or More) | Justin H. Min |

Thursday, September 17
| Category | Presenter |
|---|---|
| Outstanding Casting for a Comedy Series | Leslie Odom Jr. |
| Outstanding Casting for a Drama Series | Leslie Odom Jr. |
| Outstanding Short Form Comedy or Drama Series | Leslie Odom Jr. |
| Outstanding Short Form Animated Program | Wanda Sykes |
| Outstanding Derivative Interactive Program | Gabriel Iglesias |
| Outstanding Original Interactive Program | Gabriel Iglesias |
| Outstanding Music Supervision | Erin Moriarty |
| Outstanding Music Composition for a Limited Series, Movie or Special (Original Dramatic Score) | Erin Moriarty |
| Outstanding Choreography for Scripted Programming | Cheryl Burke |
| Outstanding Innovation in Interactive Programming | Cheryl Burke |
| Outstanding Individual Achievement in Animation | Monica Aldama |
| Outstanding Motion Design | Monica Aldama |
| Outstanding Original Music and Lyrics | Jeff Bridges |
| Outstanding Original Main Title Theme Music | Jeff Bridges |
| Outstanding Stunt Coordination for a Comedy Series or Variety Program | Dylan McDermott |
| Outstanding Character Voice-Over Performance | Dylan McDermott |
| Outstanding Actor in a Short Form Comedy or Drama Series | Lamorne Morris |
| Outstanding Actress in a Short Form Comedy or Drama Series | Lamorne Morris |

Saturday, September 19
| Category | Presenter |
|---|---|
| Outstanding Animated Program | Wanda Sykes |
| Outstanding Casting for a Limited Series, Movie or Special | Monica Raymund |
| Outstanding Guest Actor in a Comedy Series | Laverne Cox |
| Exceptional Merit in Documentary Filmmaking | Daryl Mitchell |
| Outstanding Host for a Reality or Competition Program | Erin Moriarty |
| Outstanding Sound Editing for a Limited Series, Movie or Special | Josh Flagg; Tracy Tutor |
| Outstanding Contemporary Makeup (Non-Prosthetic) | Hilarie Burton; Jeffrey Dean Morgan |
| Outstanding Contemporary Costumes | Brandee Evans |
| Outstanding Period and/or Character Hairstyling | Sofia Hublitz |
| Outstanding Variety Special (Pre-Recorded) | Desus Nice; The Kid Mero |
| Outstanding Music Composition for a Series (Original Dramatic Score) | J. B. Smoove |
| Outstanding Choreography for Variety or Reality Programming | Cheryl Burke |
| Outstanding Main Title Design | Jeremy Pope |
| Outstanding Guest Actress in a Comedy Series | Leslie Odom Jr. |
| Outstanding Unstructured Reality Program | Dylan McDermott |
| Outstanding Children's Program | Giancarlo Esposito |
| Outstanding Commercial | Chris Hardwick |
| Outstanding Cinematography for a Single-Camera Series (One Hour) | Rob Riggle |
| Outstanding Directing for a Variety Special | Thomas Lennon |
| Outstanding Single-Camera Picture Editing for a Comedy Series | Justin H. Min |
| Outstanding Guest Actor in a Drama Series | Rose Byrne; Bobby Cannavale |
| Outstanding Writing for a Variety Special | Issa Rae |
| Outstanding Lighting Design / Lighting Direction for a Variety Series | John Hodgman |
| Outstanding Production Design for a Narrative Period or Fantasy Program (One Hour or More) | Drew Scott |
| Outstanding Sound Mixing for a Comedy or Drama Series (One Hour) | Jim Gaffigan; Jeannie Gaffigan |
| Outstanding Stunt Coordination for a Drama Series, Limited Series or Movie | Gina Carano |
| Outstanding Television Movie | Lamorne Morris |
| Outstanding Interactive Extension of a Linear Program | Gabriel Iglesias |
| Outstanding Guest Actress in a Drama Series | Jeff Bridges |
| Outstanding Documentary or Nonfiction Series | RuPaul |

== Ceremony information ==
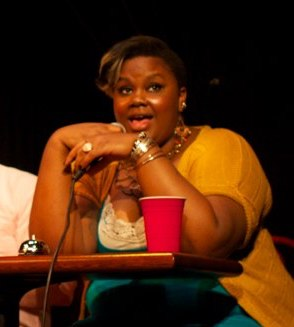
Nicole Byer served as host for the five-night event.

The 72nd Primetime Creative Arts Emmy Awards were originally scheduled for September 12 and 13, 2020, falling a week before the main ceremony and spreading the awards across two nights as had been done in previous years. However, due to the COVID-19 pandemic, the ceremonies were moved in June to several unspecified nights in a virtual format, with a five-night plan being outlined in early August. The new format divided the ceremonies by genre as follows:

- Monday, September 14: Reality and Nonfiction
- Tuesday, September 15: Variety
- Wednesday, September 16: Scripted (Night One)
- Thursday, September 17: Scripted (Night Two)
- Saturday, September 19: "An eclectic mix of awards across all genres"

The first four ceremonies were streamed on Emmys.com via a YouTube livestream, with the fifth night airing on FXX. All of the virtual ceremonies were produced by Bob Bain Productions, and Nicole Byer served as the host for the event from the Television Academy's headquarters in North Hollywood. While events during the ceremony were called live and winners were not known until being revealed to the director, all footage was pre-taped; each nominee was asked to submit an acceptance speech in advance, with only the winners' speeches being broadcast. While the ceremony mostly proceeded without a hitch, one notable error occurred when Jason Bateman was read as the winner for Guest Actor in a Drama Series, while Ron Cephas Jones – the actual winner – was listed on screen. Other glitches included the screen listing "Need Names" instead of recognizing the hairstyling team from Hollywood and an incorrect graphics card for Maya Rudolph's win for Guest Actress in a Comedy Series.

=== Category and rule changes ===
Changes that affected Creative Arts categories included:

- Outstanding Informational Series or Special was changed to Outstanding Hosted Nonfiction Series or Special.
- Awards for interactive programs were realigned into the new categories of Outstanding Derivative Interactive Program, Outstanding Original Interactive Program, and Outstanding Interactive Extension of a Linear Program.
- Makeup and hairstyling awards were rearranged; the new categories were divided into period and contemporary awards, similar to costume categories.
- Category descriptions for Outstanding Structured Reality Program and Outstanding Unstructured Reality Program were revised.
- Outstanding Children's Program now limited voting to only children's programming and animation peer groups.
- Short-form programs could not exceed 17 minutes in length.

Four categories were also moved to the Creative Arts ceremony from the main ceremony: Outstanding Directing for a Variety Series, Outstanding Writing for a Variety Series, Outstanding Variety Sketch Series, and Outstanding Television Movie.
