= Sam Battle =

Sam Battle may refer to:

- Samuel J. Battle (1883–1966), American police office, parole, commissioner and porter
- Sam Battle, stage name of Sam Bartle (born 1988 or 1989) English musician, YouTuber, and electronics enthusiast, also known as Look Mum No Computer
