= Laurel Canyon (TV series) =

Documentary television series

- Directed by: Alison Ellwood
- Composer: Paul Pilot
- Country of origin: United States
- Original language: English
- No. of episodes: 2

Production
- Executive producers: Justin Falvey; Darryl Frank; Craig Kallman; Frank Marshall; Alex Gibney; Richard Perello; Jeffrey Pollack; Stacey Offman; Mark Pinkus; Jill Burkhart; Michael Wright
- Production companies: Amblin Television; Jigsaw Productions; The Kennedy/Marshall Company; Warner Music Entertainment; MGM Television

Original release
- Network: Epix
- Release: May 31 – June 7, 2020

Laurel Canyon: A Place in Time is a two-part documentary television series directed by Alison Ellwood. It is executive-produced by Frank Marshall; Darryl Frank and Justin Falvey, Amblin Television; Craig Kallman and Mark Pinkus, Warner Music Entertainment; Alex Gibney, Stacey Offman and Richard Perello, Jigsaw Productions; and Jeff Pollack. It premiered in two parts on Epix on May 31, 2020 and June 7, 2020.

== Summary ==
Each episode depicts the music scene that arose in the Los Angeles neighborhood of the same name, where many legendary artists inhabited and gathered beginning in the late 1960s. Central to the narrative are photography collections and narration from Canyon photographers Henry Diltz and Nurit Wilde.

The documentary was split into two episodes directed by Alison Ellwood, airing on May 31 and June 7, 2020.

== Musicians ==
The documentary features music from artists including Crosby, Stills, Nash & Young, Joni Mitchell, The Doors, The Byrds, Eagles and more. It also includes original interviews with Bonnie Raitt, Linda Ronstadt, Don Henley, Michelle Phillips, Graham Nash, Roger McGuinn and others.

== Accolades ==
Year	Award	Category	Nominee(s)	Result	Ref.
2020	Primetime Emmy Awards	Outstanding Documentary or Nonfiction Special	Erin Edeiken, Ryan Suffern, Frank Marshall, Alex Gibney, Stacey Offman, Richard Perello and Jeff Pollack	Nominated	
2020	Primetime Emmy Awards	Outstanding Sound Editing for a Nonfiction or Reality Program (Single or Multi-Camera)	Jonathan Greber	Nominated	
2020	Primetime Emmy Awards	Outstanding Sound Mixing for a Nonfiction or Reality Program (Single or Multi-Camera)	Gary A. Rizzo, Stephen Urata, Danielle Dupre and Tony Villaflor	Nominated	
2021	Cinema Audio Society Awards	Outstanding Achievement in Sound Mixing for Television Non Fiction, Variety or Music – Series or Specials	Gary A. Rizzo, Stephen Urata, Danielle Dupre, Tony Villaflor and Dave Lynch	Nominated	
2021	Golden Reel Awards	Outstanding Achievement in Sound Editing – Non-Theatrical Documentary	Jonathan Greber and Lucas Miller (for "Episode 1")	Won	
2021	Producers Guild of America Awards	Outstanding Producer of Non-Fiction Television	Craig Kallman, Mark Pinkus, Darryl Frank, Justin Falvey, Stacey Offman, Richard Perello, Jeff Pollack, Alex Gibney, Frank Marshall, Erin Edeiken and Ryan Suffern	Nominated	
