= Cinema Audio Society Awards 2020 =

US film and television awards ceremony

The 57th Cinema Audio Society Awards was held on April 17, 2021, virtually, honoring outstanding achievement in sound mixing in film and television of 2020.

== Winners and nominees ==
Outstanding Achievement in Sound Mixing for a Motion Picture – Live Action	Outstanding Achievement in Sound Mixing for a Motion Picture – Animated
Sound of Metal – Phillip Bladh, production mixer; Nicolas Becker, Jaime Baksht & Michelle Couttolenc, re-recording mixers; Carlos Cortez Navarrette, ADR mixer; Kari Vähäkuopus, Foley mixer; Greyhound – David Wyman, production mixer; Michael Minkler, Christian Minkler, Richard Kitting & Beau Borders, re-recording mixers; Greg Hayes, scoring mixer; George A. Lara, Foley mixer; Mank – Drew Kunin, production mixer; Ren Klyce, David Parker & Nathan Nance, re-recording mixers; Alan Meyerson, scoring mixer; Charleen Richards-Steeves, ADR mixer; Scott Curtis, Foley mixer; News of the World – John Patrick Pritchett, production mixer; Mike Prestwood Smith & William Miller, re-recording mixers; Shawn Murphy, scoring mixer; Mark DeSimone, ADR mixer; Adam Fil Méndez, Foley mixer; The Trial of the Chicago 7 – Thomas Varga, production mixer; Julian Slater & Michael Babcock, re-recording mixers; Daniel Pemberton, scoring mixer; Justin W. Walker, ADR mixer; Kevin Schultz, Foley mixer	Soul – Vincent Caro, original dialogue mixer; Ren Klyce & David Parker, re-recording mixers; Atticus Ross & David Boucher, scoring mixers; Bobby Johanson, ADR mixer; Scott Curtis, Foley mixer; A Shaun the Sheep Movie: Farmageddon – Dom Boucher, dialogue and ADR mixer; Chris Burdon, Gilbert Lake & Adrian Rhodes, re-recording mixers; Alan Meyerson, scoring mixer; Ant Bayman, Foley mixer; Onward – Vincent Caro & Doc Kane, original dialogue mixers; Michael Semanick & Juan Peralta, re-recording mixers; Brad Haehnel, scoring mixer; Scott Curtis, Foley mixer; The Croods: A New Age – Tighe Sheldon, original dialogue mixer; Christopher Scarabosio & Leff Lefferts, re-recording mixers; Alan Meyerson, scoring mixer; Richard Duarte & Scott Curtis, Foley mixers; Trolls World Tour – Tighe Sheldon, original dialogue mixer; Scott Millan & Paul Hackner, re-recording mixers; Christopher Fogel, scoring mixer; Randy K. Singer, Foley mixer
Outstanding Achievement in Sound Mixing for a Motion Picture – Documentary	Outstanding Achievement in Sound Mixing for a Television Movie or Mini-Series
The Bee Gees: How Can You Mend a Broken Heart – Gary A. Rizzo & Jeff King, re-recording mixers; David Attenborough: A Life on Our Planet – Graham Wild, re-recording mixer; Gareth Cousins, scoring mixer; My Octopus Teacher – Barry Donnelly, re-recording mixer; Charl Mostert, Foley mixer; The Social Dilemma – Mark A. Crawford, production mixer; Scott R. Lewis, re-recording mixer; Mark Venezia, scoring mixer; Jason Butler, Foley mixer; Zappa – Monty Buckles, production mixer; Marty Zub & Lon Bender, re-recording mixers	The Queen's Gambit – Roland Winke, production mixer; Eric Hoehn, Eric Hirsch & Leo Marcil, re-recording mixers; Lawrence Manchester, scoring mixer (Episode: "Middle Game") (Netflix); American Horror Story: 1984 – Alex Altman, production mixer; Joe Earle & Doug Andham, re-recording mixers; Judah Getz, ADR mixer; Jacob McNaughton, Foley mixer (Episode: "Final Girl") (FX); Fargo – J.T. Mueller, production mixer; Jeffrey Perkins & Josh Eckberg, re-recording mixers; Michael Perfitt, scoring mixer; Matt Hovland, ADR mixer; Randy Wilson, Foley mixer (Episode: "East/West") (FX); Lovecraft Country – Amanda Beggs, production mixer; Marc Fishman & Mathew Waters, re-recording mixers; Brad Hacknell, scoring mixer; Miguel Araujo, ADR mixer; Brett Voss, Foley mixer (Episode: "Sundown") (HBO); Watchmen – Doug Axtell, production mixer; Joseph DeAngelis & Chris Carpenter, re-recording mixers; Atticus Ross, scoring mixer; Judah Getz, ADR mixer; Antony Zeller, Foley mixer (Episode: "This Extraordinary Being") (HBO)
Outstanding Achievement in Sound Mixing for Television Series – One Hour	Outstanding Achievement in Sound Mixing for Television Series – Half Hour
The Marvelous Mrs. Maisel – Mathew Price, production mixer; Ron Bochar, re-recording mixer; Stewart Lerman, scoring mixer; David Boulton, ADR mixer; George A. Lara, Foley mixer (Episode: "A Jewish Girl Walks Into the Apollo...") (Amazon Prime Video); Better Call Saul – Phillip W. Palmer, production mixer; Larry B. Benjamin & Kevin Valentine, re-recording mixers; Chris Navarro, ADR mixer; Stacey Michaels, Foley mixer (Episode: "Bagman") (AMC); Ozark – Filipe Borrero, production mixer; Larry B. Benjamin & Kevin Valentine, re-recording mixers; Phil McGowan, scoring mixer; Chris Navarro, ADR mixer; Amy Barber, Foley mixer (Episode: "All In") (Netflix); The Crown – Chris Ashworth, production mixer; Lee Walpole, Stuart Hilliker & Martin Jensen, re-recording mixers; Gibran Farrah, ADR mixer; Catherine Thomas, Foley mixer (Episode: "Gold Stick") (Netflix); Westworld – Geoffrey Patterson, production mixer; Keith A. Rogers & Benjamin L. Cook, re-recording mixers; Ramin Djawadi, scoring mixer (Episode: "The Mother of Exiles") (HBO)	The Mandalorian – Shawn Holden, production mixer; Bonnie Wild & Stephen Urata, re-recording mixers; Christopher Fogel, scoring mixer; Matthew Wood, ADR mixer; Blake Collins, Foley mixer (Episode: "Chapter 2: The Child") (Disney+); Dead to Me – Steven Michael Morantz, production mixer; Brad Sherman & Alexander Gruzdev, re-recording mixers; Jason Oliver, ADR mixer (Episode: "You Know What You Did") (Netflix); Modern Family – Stephen A. Tibbo & Srdjan Popovic, production mixers; Dean Okrand, Brian Harman & Peter Bawiec, re-recording mixers; Matt Hovland, ADR mixer; David Michael Torres, Foley mixer (Episode: "Finale Part 1") (ABC); Ted Lasso – David Lascelles, production mixer; Ryan Kennedy & Sean Byrne, re-recording mixers; Brent Findley & Marilyn Morris, ADR mixers; George Murphy, scoring mixer; Jordan McClain, Foley mixer (Episode: "The Hope that Kills You") (Apple TV+); The Mandalorian – Shawn Holden, production mixer; Bonnie Wild & Stephen Urata, re-recording mixers; Christopher Fogel, scoring mixer; Matthew Wood, ADR mixer; Jason Butler, Foley mixer (Episode: "Chapter 13: The Jedi") (Disney+)
Outstanding Achievement in Sound Mixing for Television Non Fiction, Variety or Music – Series or Specials
Hamilton – Justin Rathbun, production mixer; Tony Volante, Rob Fernandez & Tim Latham, re-recording mixers; Beastie Boys Story – Jacob Feinberg & William Tzouris, production mixers; Martyn Zub, re-recording mixer; Bruce Springsteen's Letter to You – Brad Bergdom, production mixer; Kevin O'Connell & Kyle Arzt, re-recording mixers; Bob Clearmountain, music mixer; Laurel Canyon: A Place in Time – Gary A. Rizzo, Stephen Urata, Danielle Dupre & Tony Villaflor, re-recording mixers; Dave Lynch, scoring mixer; NASA & SpaceX: Journey to the Future – Erik Clabeaux, production mixer; Michael Keeley, re-recording mixer
