= This Extraordinary Being =

- Watchmen episode
- Episode no.: Episode 6
- Directed by: Stephen Williams
- Written by: Damon Lindelof; Cord Jefferson
- Cinematography by: Gregory Middleton
- Editing by: Anna Hauger
- Production code: 106
- Original air date: November 24, 2019
- Running time: 61 minutes

Guest appearances
- Jovan Adepo as Young Will Reeves; Jake McDorman as Nelson Gardner; Glenn Fleshler as Fred; Cheyenne Jackson as Hooded Justice; Danielle Deadwyler as June Reeves; Erik Palladino as Agent Art; Valeri Ross as Old Woman

Episode chronology
← Previous "Little Fear of Lightning"	Next → "An Almost Religious Awe"

"This Extraordinary Being" is the sixth episode of the HBO superhero drama miniseries Watchmen, based on the 1986 DC Comics series of the same name by Alan Moore and Dave Gibbons. The episode was written by Damon Lindelof and Cord Jefferson and directed by Stephen Williams, and aired on November 24, 2019. It is principally the origin story of Hooded Justice, a minor character from the original comic.

== Synopsis ==
Laurie tries to get Angela to sign a waiver for medical care so they can get the Nostalgia out of her system before it sets in, but Angela slips into a lucid dream. She experiences Will Reeves' memories as one of the first black officers in the NYPD circa 1938. These are intermingled with memories from the 1921 Tulsa race massacre. During Will's induction, officer Samuel J. Battle cryptically warns him to beware of "Cyclops."

After attempting to arrest Fred, a white shopkeeper, for setting fire to a Jewish deli, Will is warned not to interfere, and finds Fred walking free hours later. As he walks home, other white officers abduct him, cover him in a hood, and lynch him. They stop short of choking Will to death and warn him to stay out of "white folks' business." Leaving the noose on and carrying the hood, Will walks home but observes a young couple being attacked by thugs. Will quickly turns the hood into a mask and rescues the couple. News of Will's deed is covered in the papers, making him a hero. Will's wife June, who is revealed to be the baby he cared for as a child following the Tulsa massacre, urges him to adopt the role. Will takes on the vigilante name "Hooded Justice," creating a costume that obscures his ethnicity. He finds that the Ku Klux Klan are behind Cyclops, which includes the police officers who attacked him, but does not know the extent of their plans.

Hooded Justice is invited to join the Minutemen by Nelson Gardner / Captain Metropolis. Will accepts, and he and Nelson begin a sexual relationship, but Nelson cautions Will to maintain his masked identity in front of the other Minutemen. Years pass, and Will and June have a son. After a riot in a movie theater, Will discovers that Cyclops is using film projectors to hypnotize African-Americans into committing acts of violence upon one another. He tracks down Cyclops' New York operation to a warehouse belonging to Fred. He calls Nelson for the Minutemen's help, but Nelson refuses to let them become involved. Alone, Will burns down the warehouse and murders everyone present, and absconds with one of the projectors. Returning home, Will finds that his young son is dressing up as Hooded Justice, and berates him. June, disturbed at the extent to which Will is absorbed in his Hooded Justice identity, decides to leave him and return to Tulsa with their children.

In the near present, Will is shown to be responsible for Judd's death, using a modified version of the film projector to hypnotize Judd into hanging himself, believing Judd is part of Cyclops. Angela is brought out of her dreams in Lady Trieu's quarters.

== Production ==
=== Writing ===
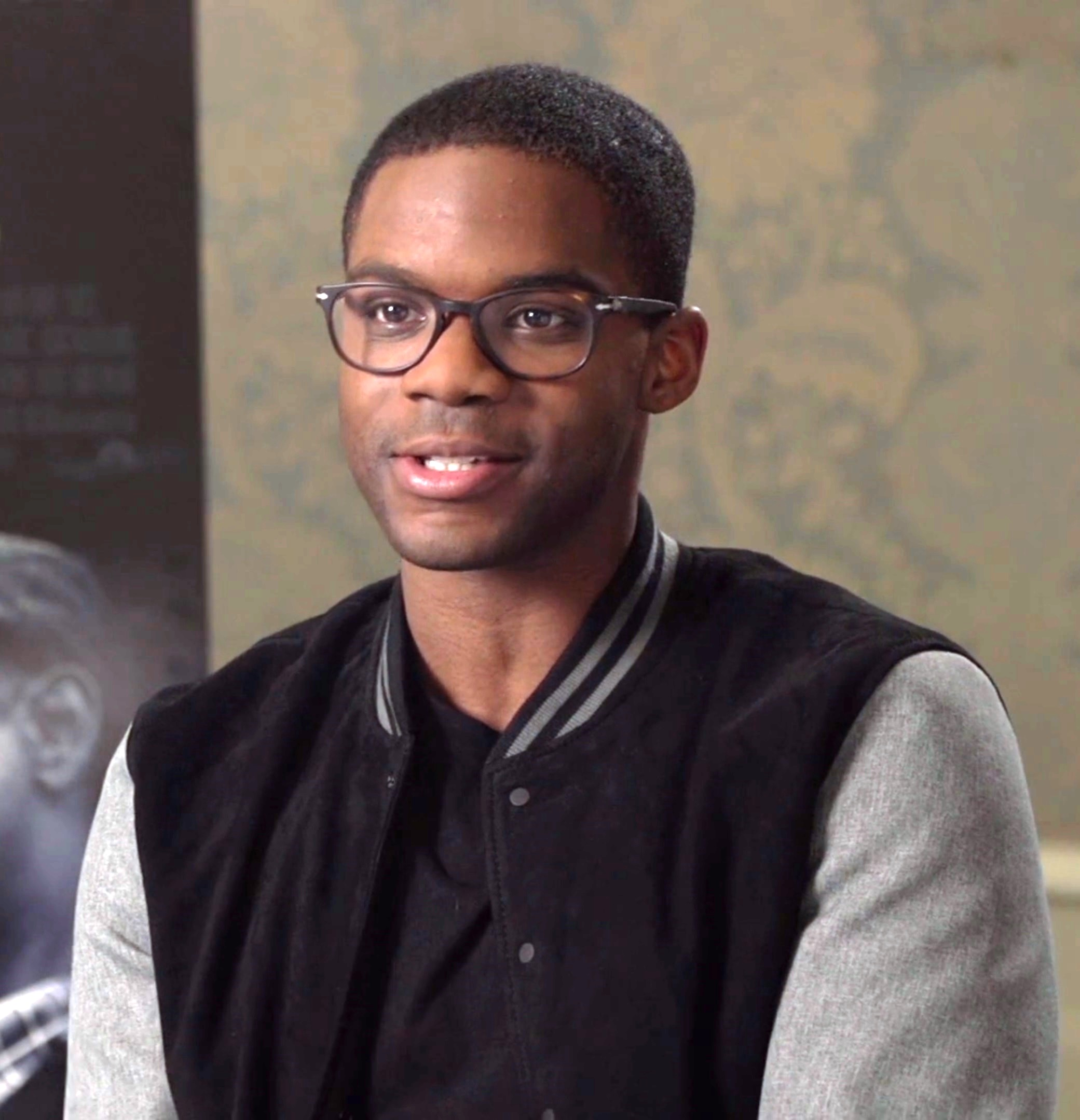
Jovan Adepo guest-starred as young Will Reeves and the masked viligante Hooded Justice in this episode.

"This Extraordinary Being" establishes the origins of Hooded Justice, revealing that he was in fact Will Reeves, Angela's grandfather. Much of the origin of Hooded Justice is based on the material that Alan Moore and Dave Gibbons had established for the Watchmen comic series. While Hooded Justice is a minor character whose identity was never revealed within the comic book, he played a key role in stopping the attempted rape of Silk Spectre by The Comedian shortly after the Minutemen had posed for their first photo session. Many elements of the comic's supplemental texts written by Moore as interludes, particularly the fictional Under the Hood memoirs by Hollis Mason (the original Nite Owl), were drawn from and referenced in the episode. These included Hooded Justice saving a young couple in his first known appearance, his participation in the Minutemen photo session, and his homosexuality.

The miniseries also contains scenes from a fictional TV series within the show's universe centered on the Minutemen titled American Hero Story: Minutemen (a parody of the American Horror Story franchise), depicting a violent, hyper-stylized version of Hooded Justice played by Cheyenne Jackson (who himself starred on American Horror Story). "This Extraordinary Being" opens with a scene from American Hero Story in which Hooded Justice is unmasked as bodybuilder Rolf Müller, whom Mason speculated to be Hooded Justice's true identity in Under the Hood. Mason notes that Müller's body was later recovered from the sea, which the miniseries had depicted as the opening scene of American Hero Story in the episode "Martial Feats of Comanche Horsemanship."

Remarking on the racial themes in the episode, director Stephen Williams stated that Watchmen endeavors to "unearth... that part of our collective history that has been neglected, or omitted, like Tulsa 1921, in the pilot.... These are all parts of African American history, and obviously, by extension, therefore straight-up American history that have been given short shrift." The episode's title is taken from Hollis Mason's introduction of Hooded Justice in Under the Hood.

Will is shown being inducted into the New York Police Department by Samuel J. Battle (played by Philly Plowden), who in reality was the first black officer in the force. Vox observed that the character of Fred, the racist white supermarket owner played by Glenn Fleshler, appears to allude to Fred Trump, the father of Donald Trump, based on both his appearance and other elements that aligned with the elder Trump's biography, including his involvement with the Ku Klux Klan.

=== Filming ===
"This Extraordinary Being" is largely filmed in black and white, outside of the opening and closing scenes. Selected elements of some scenes are shown in color, such as the imagery of Will's mother playing the piano. Additionally, in seemingly one-shot takes, young Will (played by Jovan Adepo) is swapped out in scenes with Angela (Regina King) to show her immersion in the Nostalgia-induced lucid dream. Director Stephen Williams, who previously worked with Lindelof on Lost, was hired to direct this episode even before its script had been written. Williams was drawn in by the premise of the episode from Lindelof's description, and opted to use the black and white filming approach as this episode needed to be presented differently from the rest of the series, using colored elements to indicate "the incursion of other memories that were pivotal and meaningful and significant for Will that imposed themselves on that landscape". Williams ran several test filming runs for many of the episode's practical effects using stand-ins for the main actors. Many of the uncut shots featuring Adepo and King were done with simple camera movement, allowing the actors to switch places during the shot. Other long-takes were also done with practical effects: for example, the shot taken from Will's point of view during his near-lynching was executed by hoisting the camera out of the operator's hands, holding it there long enough, and then lowering it back down to continue the shot.

Most of the episode was filmed in Macon, Georgia, which stood in for a 1930s New York City.

== Reception ==
=== Critical response ===
"This Extraordinary Being" received critical acclaim. On Rotten Tomatoes, the episode has an approval rating of 96% with an average score of 9.33 out of 10, based on 28 reviews. The site's critical consensus reads, "Revealing and relevant, 'This Extraordinary Being' cleverly shows the long-term effects of generational trauma and deep-seated racism."

=== Accolades ===
For the 72nd Primetime Emmy Awards, Damon Lindelof and Cord Jefferson won the award for Outstanding Writing for a Limited Series, Movie, or Dramatic Special for this episode. Director Stephen Williams was nominated for Outstanding Directing for a Limited Series, Movie or Dramatic Special, and Adepo was nominated for Outstanding Supporting Actor in a Limited Series or Movie.

The episode was nominated for the GLAAD Media Award for Outstanding Individual Episode featuring an LGBTQ character. In addition, Williams was nominated for the Directors Guild of America Award for Outstanding Directing – Drama Series for the episode (an award that was won by Nicole Kassell for "It's Summer and We're Running Out of Ice", another Watchmen episode), while Lindelof and Jefferson were nominated for the NAACP Image Award for Outstanding Writing in a Dramatic Series for the episode, which was won by Nichelle Tramble Spellman for "Monster", the first episode of her Apple TV+ show Truth Be Told. "This Extraordinary Being" was nominated for a Hugo for Best Dramatic Presentation, Short Form, alongside "A God Walks into Abar".

=== Ratings ===
"This Extraordinary Being" was watched by an estimated 620,000 viewers on its first broadcast.
