= Beastie Boys Story =

2020 American documentary film

- Directed by: Spike Jonze
- Written by: Spike Jonze; Michael Diamond; Adam Horovitz
- Based on: Beastie Boys Book by Michael Diamond and Adam Horovitz
- Produced by: Spike Jonze; Jason Baum; Amanda Adelson
- Starring: Michael Diamond; Adam Horovitz; Adam Yauch
- Cinematography: Autumn Durald
- Edited by: Jeff Buchanan; Zoe Schack
- Production companies: Oscilloscope Laboratories; Fresh Bread Films; Pulse Films; PolyGram Entertainment
- Distributed by: Apple TV+
- Release date: April 24, 2020 (United States)
- Running time: 120 minutes
- Country: United States
- Language: English

Beastie Boys Story is a 2020 American biographical documentary film, directed, produced, and written by Spike Jonze, alongside Michael "Mike D" Diamond and Adam "Ad-Rock" Horovitz. It was filmed at Kings Theatre in Brooklyn, New York and adapted from Beastie Boys Book (2018), a memoir of the Beastie Boys written mainly by Diamond and Horovitz. Jonze reunited with the remaining Beastie Boys for the project after having directed several music videos for them in the past, including "Sabotage" in 1994. It features archival footage of Adam Yauch, whose death in 2012 led to the band's dissolution.

It was scheduled to be released in a limited cinema release on April 3, 2020, followed by digital streaming on April 24, 2020, by Apple TV+. The limited cinema release was cancelled due to the COVID-19 pandemic.

== Cast ==
- Michael Diamond as himself
- Adam Horovitz as himself
- Adam Yauch as himself (archival content)
- Bill Hader as Crazy Shit Voice
- Michael K. Williams as Bob Dylan
- Ben Stiller, David Cross and Steve Buscemi as themselves - audience members

== Release ==
Beastie Boys Story was scheduled to have its world premiere at South by Southwest on March 16, 2020, but the festival was cancelled due to the COVID-19 pandemic. The film was also scheduled to be released in a limited cinema release on April 3, 2020, in selected IMAX cinemas, but it was pulled from the schedule due to cinema closures that started in mid March because of the pandemic restrictions. Digital streaming was made available on Apple TV+ on April 24, 2020.

== Reception ==
=== Critical reception ===
On review aggregator Rotten Tomatoes, the film has an approval rating of 94% based on 84 reviews. The website's critical consensus, which is a reference to the 1986 Beastie Boys song "Paul Revere," reads, "Here's a Beastie Boys Story they had to tell, about three bad brothers you know so well. It started way back in history -- and for new or old fans, it's a must-see." It has a score of 75 out of 100 on Metacritic, a site that aggregates a normalized rating, indicating "generally positive reviews".

Erik Adams of The A.V. Club gave the film a C+ and criticized it for poor pacing and lacking fun. His review concludes: "There's not a lot of new insights or Criterion Collection-worthy film-making on offer, but for fans, the documentary will be a reminder of why they got into Ad-Rock, MCA, and Mike D in the first place. It's all there in the outtakes: The Beastie Boys story is simply too big, too strange, too unwieldy for Beastie Boys Story to contain it."

=== Accolades ===
Award	Date of ceremony	Category	Recipient(s)	Result	Ref.
Hollywood Critics Association	January 9, 2020	Best Documentary Film	Beastie Boys Story	Won	
Primetime Creative Arts Emmy Awards	September 14, 2020–September 17, 2020	Outstanding Documentary or Nonfiction Special	Jason Baum, Amanda Adelson, Spike Jonze, Mike Diamond, Adam Horovitz, Dechen Wangdu-Yauch and John Silva	Nominated	
Primetime Creative Arts Emmy Awards	September 14, 2020–September 17, 2020	Outstanding Picture Editing for Nonfiction Programming	Jeff Buchanan and Zoe Schack	Nominated	
Primetime Creative Arts Emmy Awards	September 14, 2020–September 17, 2020	Outstanding Sound Editing for a Nonfiction or Reality Program (Single or Multi-Camera)	Martyn Zub, Paul Aulicino and Pernell Salinas	Nominated	
Primetime Creative Arts Emmy Awards	September 14, 2020–September 17, 2020	Outstanding Sound Mixing for a Nonfiction or Reality Program (Single or Multi-Camera)	William Tzouris, Jacob Feinberg and Martyn Zub	Nominated	
Primetime Creative Arts Emmy Awards	September 14, 2020–September 17, 2020	Outstanding Writing for Nonfiction Programming	Mike Diamond, Adam Horovitz and Spike Jonze	Nominated	
Online Film & Television Association	September 27, 2020	Best Reality or Non-Fiction Program	Beastie Boys Story	Nominated	
Critics’ Choice Documentary Awards	November 16, 2020	Best Music Documentary	Beastie Boys Story	Won	
Hawaii Film Critics Society	January 12, 2021	Best Documentary	Beastie Boys Story	Won	
International Documentary Awards	January 21, 2021	Best Music Documentary	Beastie Boys Story	Nominated	
Grammy Awards	March 14, 2021	Best Music Film	Beastie Boys Story	Nominated	
Golden Reel Awards	April 16, 2021	Outstanding Achievement in Sound Editing – Non-Theatrical Documentary	Martyn Zub and Paul Aulicino	Nominated	
American Cinema Editors Eddie Awards	April 17, 2021	Best Edited Documentary (Non-Theatrical)	Jeff Buchanan and Zoe Schack	Nominated	
Cinema Audio Society Awards	April 17, 2021	Outstanding Achievement in Sound Mixing – Television Non-Fiction, Variety or Music Series or Specials	Jacob Feinberg, William Tzouris and Martyn Zub	Nominated	
