= It's Summer and We're Running Out of Ice =

- Watchmen episode
- Episode no.: Episode 1
- Directed by: Nicole Kassell
- Written by: Damon Lindelof
- Cinematography by: Andrij Parekh
- Editing by: David Eisenberg
- Production code: 101
- Original air date: October 20, 2019
- Running time: 60 minutes

Guest appearances
- Frances Fisher as Jane Crawford; Charles Brice as Charlie Sutton; Michael Graziadei as Carmichael; Jessica Camacho as Pirate Jenny; Wayne Pére as The Suspect; Geraldine Singer as Ms. Sweetwater

Episode chronology
← Previous —	Next → "Martial Feats of Comanche Horsemanship"

"It's Summer and We're Running Out of Ice" is the pilot episode of the HBO superhero drama miniseries Watchmen, based on the 1986 DC Comics series of the same name by Alan Moore and Dave Gibbons. The episode was written by Damon Lindelof and directed by Nicole Kassell, and aired on October 20, 2019. The episode introduces the show's lead characters of Angela Abar/Sister Night (Regina King), Judd Crawford (Don Johnson), and Wade Tillman/Looking Glass (Tim Blake Nelson).

== Synopsis ==
In 1921, O.B. and Ruth Williams and their son Will try to escape Tulsa during the Tulsa race massacre. O.B. and Ruth put Will on a car leaving the city, O.B. giving him a slip of paper saying "Watch over this boy", and take shelter in a nearby building. Moments later, a biplane drops dynamite on the building, which subsequently explodes, killing O.B. and Ruth. At night, Will wakes in the grass beside the road to find the car knocked over, the driver and passengers shot dead, and an infant girl alive in the grass, abandoned as he had been. He picks her up, calms her, and carries her away from Tulsa.

In 2019, the Tulsa police force conceal their identity with masks to avoid recognition by the white supremacist militia the Seventh Kavalry. A policeman is shot by a suspected member of the Seventh Kavalry during a routine traffic stop, and Tulsa Police Chief Judd Crawford has the full force put onto investigation of the Kavalry. Detective Angela Abar, who operates for the police force under the name Sister Night, goes to her base in a bakery to change into her outfit, encountering a mysterious man in a wheelchair on the way. Abar abducts a suspected Kavalry member and brings him to Detective Wade Tillman, known as Looking Glass, to deduce the location of a Kavalry base at a farm outside town. The Tulsa police lead an assault on the farm, but the Kavalry members are killed or commit suicide in the attack, leaving no leads.

Angela's family has dinner with Judd and his wife, after which Judd makes plans to see the officer. On his way out, his car runs over a spike strip and he gets out to investigate. Later, Angela gets a call from an unknown man that knows who she really is and tells her to come to a specific tree alone. She drives to the tree to find the old man in the wheelchair there waiting for her, along with Judd's lynched body hanging from a tree.

Meanwhile, in a country manor in an unknown location, a Blonde Man returns after riding on horseback. His servants, Phillips and Crookshanks, wish him a happy anniversary, and present him with a pocket watch as a gift. The Blonde Man thanks them, and tells them he is writing a play, The Watchmaker's Son, which they will perform in when it is complete.

== Production ==
The Tulsa race massacre scenes were the first scenes shot for the show, and filmed in Cedartown, Georgia on June 1, 2018, on the 97th anniversary of the event. The crew had brought in a priest prior to filming to remember the event and pay homage to those killed during it.

The episode makes numerous allusions to the musical Oklahoma! The episode's exact title is a line taken from the lyrics of "Pore Jud Is Daid", one of the songs from that musical, and Judd Crawford is interrupted while watching a performance of the musical to learn of Sutton's attack. "Pore Jud Is Daid" plays at the end of the episode as the corpse of Judd Crawford is seen hanging from a tree.

== Reception ==
=== Critical response ===
On Rotten Tomatoes, the episode has an approval rating of 94% with an average score of 8.42 out of 10, based on 33 reviews. The site's critical consensus reads, "Along with a breathtaking Regina King, Damon Lindelof successfully remixes present-day issues with superhero themes in the highly entertaining 'It's Summer and We're Running Out of Ice.'"

The A.V. Club's Joelle Monique called the episode "as violent, thought-provoking, and humorous as the graphic novel" and "a clear studied work of the original text."

=== Accolades ===
Nicole Kassell won the Directors Guild of America Award for Outstanding Directing – Drama Series for this episode, beating Stephen Williams for the later episode "This Extraordinary Being". Sharen Davis was nominated for the Costume Designers Guild Award for Excellence in Sci-Fi/Fantasy Television, but lost to Michele Clapton for her work on "The Iron Throne", the final episode of Game of Thrones. For the 72nd Primetime Emmy Awards, Nicole Kassell was nominated for Outstanding Directing for a Limited Series, Movie, or Dramatic Special.

=== Ratings ===
According to HBO, the first episode of Watchmen had more than 1.5 million viewers on its first night across television and streaming services, the strongest debut performance for the network. The first broadcast of the episode, at 9 p.m. EDT, had 800,000 viewers, making it the most viewed debut episode for any premium-cable show in 2019.
