= Samuel J. Battle =

American police officer, parole commissioner and porter

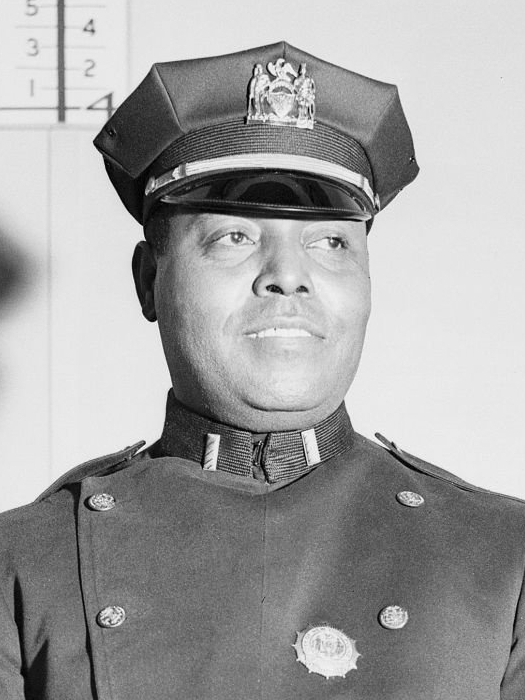
- Battle in 1935
- Born: Samuel Jesse Battle; January 16, 1883; New Bern, North Carolina, U.S.
- Died: August 7, 1966 (aged 83); New York City, New York, U.S.
- Police career
- Department: New York Police Department
- Service years: 1911–1941
- Rank: Lieutenant
- Badge no.: 5548
- Other work: Parole commissioner

Samuel Jesse Battle (January 16, 1883 – August 7, 1966) was an American police officer and one of the first African-American New York City Police Department officers, sworn in on March 6, 1911. Wellington Schuyler, a native of Flushing, NY and a Civil War veteran of the Eleventh US (Colored) Heavy Artillery, won unanimous support from the police commissioners to serve as a police officer in 1896. (The National Tribune Thu, Nov 19, 1896 ·Page 4)

== Biography ==
He was born on January 16, 1883, in New Bern, North Carolina.

His brother-in-law was Patrolman Moses P. Cobb, who started working for the Brooklyn Police force in the early 1890s before the unification of NYC and acted as Battle's mentor. "Big Sam" as he was known — 6 feet, 3 inches tall, 280 pounds — earned the respect of his fellow officers after saving one officer's life in the early 1920s. They subsequently voted to allow him into the Sergeant's Academy. As the NYPD's first black lieutenant, during the intense Harlem Riots of 1935 - after 3 days of violence he circulated flyers of himself with the young boy smiling who had allegedly been murdered in the basement of the Kress Department store.

He joined the force in 1911, assigned first to San Juan Hill, Manhattan, the neighborhood where Lincoln Center is today, which preceded Harlem as one of the key African-American neighborhoods in Manhattan. He was soon moved to Harlem, as the African-American population there grew. He would later become the first African-American police sergeant (1926), lieutenant (1935), and the first African-American parole commissioner (1941).

In 1941, Battle began work as a parole commissioner, working with delinquent youths in Harlem. He initiated rehabilitation programs, such as summer camps and sports activities for the youth of Harlem. During a 1943 race riot, triggered by the shooting of an African-American suspect by a white police officer, Battle, at the request of fellow Republican New York Mayor Fiorello LaGuardia, was called in to quell the Harlem area where the riot erupted. He noted how Lincoln sacrificed himself for the cause of reconciliation and calmed the flames. Battle retired as parole commissioner in 1951 but remained active in community activities for the Harlem area.

He died on August 7, 1966.

== Legacy ==
In 2009, the 135th and Lenox Avenue intersection in New York City was named after him.

Battle is the subject of the biography by Arthur Browne, One Righteous Man: Samuel Battle and the Shattering of the Color Line in New York (Boston, Beacon Press, 2015).

In the television series Watchmen, Battle (played by Philly Plowden) was shown inducting the character of Will Reeves, another black police officer, into the New York Police Department in 1938, warning him of the white supremacy in American policing he might face.

Battle figures prominently in the biography by Eric K. Washington, Boss of the Grips: The Life of James H. Williams and the Red Caps of Grand Central Terminal (New York, Liveright, 2019), as the subject's chief assistant, fraternal society brother and intimate family friend.

== See also ==
- List of African American firsts
