= Saturday Morning Watchmen =

2009 Internet cartoon

- Directed by: Harry Partridge
- Release dates: March 4, 2009 (Newgrounds); March 5, 2009 (YouTube)
- Running time: 1:22

Saturday Morning Watchmen is a Newgrounds and YouTube viral video published on March 5, 2009, the day before the release of the live-action Watchmen film.

The video parodies the DC Comics limited series Watchmen by Alan Moore and Dave Gibbons, portraying the opening sequence of a fictional 1980s Saturday morning cartoon based on the series. The video was animated, written, composed and sung by Harry Partridge and voiced by Partridge, Joshua Tomar, and Hans Van Harken. In stark contrast to the comic, it has a cheerful, upbeat tone, poking fun at the tendency of the campy nature of 1980s animation to sanitize superheroes and other violent themes. It features many of the mainstays of 1980s cartoons, like catchy rock themes, and references to the openings of ThunderCats, Teenage Mutant Ninja Turtles, Jem, The Legend of Zelda, and Scooby-Doo. On the Newgrounds site, Partridge stated the video "combines two huge passions of mine, one being the comic genius that is Alan Moore and the other being kids' programming from the late '80s, which I would say is my biggest animation inspiration."

Partridge wrote the video for Playboy.com, which "wanted a viral hit", but decided it was "too good for their crappy website".

== Contents ==
Saturday Morning Watchmen is styled after the opening sequences of 1980s Saturday morning cartoons. The video begins with Ozymandias calling the Watchmen to stop the "Reds" from polluting a lake. The video then introduces the various Watchmen as comrades and lovable crime fighters. The characters dance, eat pizza, and teach lessons like saying no to drugs and getting to bed on time. A rock theme song plays, and the team unites in front of a logo at the clip's end.

=== Watchmen elements ===
Screenshot of the Watchmen gathered together

The short film claims to be a 1980s animated television version of Watchmen, and features Rorschach, Ozymandias, Silk Spectre II, The Comedian, Doctor Manhattan, Nite Owl II, Bubastis the genetically engineered red and black-striped lynx, and the giant space-squid from the comics. Concepts like Ozymandias' television room and Nite Owl's airship also appear in the video. However, many of the comic's concepts appear reversed, a slight at the sanitation of 1980s programming.

Nite Owl, a troubled and timid man in the comics, is portrayed as a carefree leader who "loves to party down".

Rorschach, a mentally disturbed character in the comics, appears as a "nutty" figure who is a "friend to the animals", petting a pair of German Shepherds, in contrast to the graphic novel, where he kills them with a meat cleaver after finding that a kidnapped girl by the name of Blaire Roche was fed to them.

The Comedian is depicted as hopelessly infatuated with Silk Spectre II, when in the graphic novel he was her father and attempted to rape her mother.

Doctor Manhattan, who in the comic exiles himself from Earth having been convinced his presence has given those closest to him cancer, is parodied in the video, being cheerily credited with this as a superpower: "Jon can give you cancer and can turn into a car." The sequence features several copies of Dr. Manhattan in bed, being read a story by Silk Spectre; in the comic, Dr. Manhattan multiplies while having sex with Laurie in a misguided attempt to satisfy her sexually.

The video also changes the comic's opening scene, having Ozymandias save The Comedian from falling out of a window rather than throwing him to his death.

=== 1980s cartoon elements ===
The video features numerous elements of 1980s Saturday morning cartoons, including an opening rock theme song and a sanitization of dark themes and characters. It also mocks the commercial nature that led cartoons to contain cheap animation and play off the popularity of established work.

== Reception ==
Dave Gibbons, artist for the Watchmen series, commented that he had seen the video and "loved it", remarking "The thing is, obviously they're having fun with it but the way it was done, you know that the person really cared about what they were doing…really knew Watchmen in detail." The A.V. Club rated the video highly, writing that "for fans of the graphic novel who grew up on Saturday-morning TV in the '80s, this is a) pretty damn funny, and b) a reminder of just how crappy all those shows we profess to love so dearly really were."

== See also ==
- "Husbands and Knives", an episode of The Simpsons featuring the videobox for a fictional cartoon called Watchmen Babies in V for Vacation.
