= List of Watchmen characters =

Characters in a DC Comics series

The six main characters of the 1986 comic book limited series Watchmen (from left to right): Ozymandias, the second Silk Spectre, Doctor Manhattan, the Comedian (kneeling), the second Nite Owl, and Rorschach

Watchmen is a twelve-issue comic book limited series created by Alan Moore, Dave Gibbons, and John Higgins, published by DC Comics in 1986 and 1987. Watchmen focuses on six main characters: the Comedian, Doctor Manhattan, Nite Owl II, Ozymandias, Rorschach, and the Silk Spectre II. These characters were originally based on the Mighty Crusaders and then reworked in an unsolicited proposal to fit superhero properties DC had acquired from Charlton Comics in the early 1980s. Moore later based the team's predecessors, the Minutemen, on the Mighty Crusaders. Since the publisher planned to integrate Charlton's superheroes into the main DC Universe and the script would have made many of them unusable for future stories, series writer Alan Moore eventually agreed to create original characters. Moore wished the main characters to present six "radically opposing ways" to perceive the world, and to give readers of the story the privilege of determining which one was most morally comprehensible.

The protagonists of Watchmen were reused in the prequel series Before Watchmen, which also gave backstories to several minor characters from the original graphic novel, and introduced new characters.

Later on, several Watchmen characters reappeared in the limited series Doomsday Clock, bringing them into the main DC Universe.

The television series Watchmen is set in the same canon as the limited series, taking place in 2019 in Tulsa, Oklahoma.

== Overview ==
Key

- ^{Y} A model served as a body double, with the actor's likeness superimposed onto the model.
- ^{L} Actor lent only their likeness for their film character.
- ^{P} Appearance through a photographic still.
- ^{A} Appearance by an in-universe actor portraying the character.
- Character was not in the film.

Character	Motion comic	Video game	Film	Mockumentary	Short film	Television series
Character	Watchmen: The Motion Comic	Watchmen: The End Is Nigh	Watchmen	Under the Hood	Watchmen: Tales of the Black Freighter	Watchmen
Character	2008	2009				2019
Twilight Lady Elizabeth "Liz" Lane	Tom Stechschulte	Courtney Taylor				
Doctor Manhattan Dr. Jonathan "Jon" Osterman Calvin "Cal" Abar (né Jelani)	Tom Stechschulte	Crispin Freeman	Billy Crudup Jaryd Heidrick^{Y}			Yahya Abdul-Mateen II Darrell Snedeger Zak Rothera-Oxley^{Y} Tom Mison^{A}
Rorschach I Walter Kovacs	Tom Stechschulte	Jackie Earle Haley	Jackie Earle Haley Eli Snyder^{Y}			
Nite Owl II Daniel "Dan" Dreiberg	Tom Stechschulte	Patrick Wilson	Patrick Wilson			
The Comedian Edward "Eddie" Blake	Tom Stechschulte	Mark Silverman	Jeffrey Dean Morgan	Jeffrey Dean Morgan		
Hooded Justice	Tom Stechschulte		Glenn Ennis	Glenn Ennis		Louis Gossett Jr. Jovan Adepo^{Y} Danny Boyd Jr.^{Y} Cheyenne Jackson^{A}
Captain Metropolis Nelson Gardner	Tom Stechschulte		Darryl Scheelar	Darryl Scheelar		Jake McDorman Chris Whitley^{A}
Silk Spectre I Sally Jupiter (née Juspeczyk)	Tom Stechschulte		Carla Gugino	Carla Gugino		TBA
Dollar Bill William "Bill" Brady	Tom Stechschulte		Dan Payne	Dan Payne		TBA
Mothman Byron Lewis	Tom Stechschulte		Niall Matter	Niall Matter		Brennan Kerr
The Silhouette Ursula Zandt	Tom Stechschulte		Apollonia Vanova	Apollonia Vanova		TBA
Nite Owl I Hollis Mason	Tom Stechschulte		Stephen McHattie Clint Carleton^{Y}	Stephen McHattie		TBA
William Taylor	Tom Stechschulte		William S. Taylor	William S. Taylor		
Bernard	Tom Stechschulte		Jay Brazeau	Jay Brazeau		
Wally Weaver	Tom Stechschulte		Rob LaBelle	Rob LaBelle		
Laurence "Larry" Shexnayder	Tom Stechschulte		Frank Cassini	Frank Cassini		
Larry Culpeper	Tom Stechschulte		Ted Friend	Ted Friend		
Bartender	Tom Stechschulte		John Destry	John Destry		
Woman on Street	Tom Stechschulte		Jennefer Jenei	Jennefer Jenei		
Big Figure Tom Ryan	Tom Stechschulte		Danny Woodburn	Danny Woodburn		
Moloch The Mystic Edgar "Eddie" Jacobi	Tom Stechschulte		Matt Frewer Mike Carpenter	Matt Frewer		
The Sea Captain	Tom Stechschulte		Gerard Butler		Gerard Butler	
Money Lender	Tom Stechschulte		Cam Clarke		Cam Clarke	
Sea Captain's Daughter	Tom Stechschulte		Siobhan Flynn		Siobhan Flynn Salli Saffioti	
Ridley	Tom Stechschulte		Jared Harris		Jared Harris	
Sea Captain's Wife	Tom Stechschulte		Lori Tritel		Lori Tritel Bridget Hoffman	
Ozymandias Adrian Veidt	Tom Stechschulte		Matthew Goode			Jeremy Irons
Silk Spectre II Laurel "Laurie" Jupiter (née Juspeczyk)	Tom Stechschulte		Malin Åkerman Haley Guiel^{Y}			Jean Smart
Janey Slater	Tom Stechschulte		Laura Mennell			Sara Vickers^{A}
Richard Nixon	Tom Stechschulte		Robert Wisden			Himself^{P}
Wade Tillman Looking Glass						Tim Blake Nelson Philip Labes^{Y}
Angela Abar Sister Night Sister Manhattan						Regina King Faithe Herman^{Y}
Lady Trieu Lady Manhattan						Hong Chau
Bian Trieu						Jolie Hoang-Rappaport^{Y} Elyse Dinh
Mime Marcos Maez						Tom Mison^{A}
Marionette Erika Manson						Sara Vickers^{A}
Agent Petey Lube Man						Dustin Ingram
Robert Redford						Himself^{P}

== Crimebusters ==
The Crimebusters are a superhero group that succeeds the Minutemen and are the main characters of Watchmen. The group was short-lived when the Keene Act that forbade non-government sanctioned superheroes was passed. Among its notable members are:

=== The Comedian ===
The Comedian (Edward Morgan "Eddie" Blake) is a vigilante, initially based on the Shield and then on the Charlton Comics character Peacemaker, with elements of the Marvel Comics spy character Nick Fury added. Moore and Gibbons saw the Comedian as "a kind of Gordon Liddy character, only a much bigger, tougher guy". Gibbons went with a Groucho Marx-style appearance (mustache and cigar) for the Comedian in his design, deciding that the "clown" look had already been appropriated by the DC Comics supervillain the Joker. His costume itself was noted by Gibbons as being particularly problematic; he was initially designed with a more militaristic costume which was later dropped for a black leather outfit with a "rapist mask". He believes that humans are savage in nature, and that civilization can never be more than an idea. He, therefore, chooses to become a mockery of society, fighting and killing without reservation.

Blake's murder, which takes place shortly before the story begins in 1985, sets the plot of Watchmen in motion. The character appears throughout the story in flashbacks and aspects of his personality are revealed by other characters. Richard Reynolds described the Comedian as "ruthless, cynical, and nihilistic, and yet capable of deeper insights than the others into the role of the costumed hero". Nicholas Michael Grant said the Comedian is "the only character in the Watchmen universe who is almost totally unlikeable."

In the Watchmen film, he is portrayed by Jeffrey Dean Morgan. The film also places him as John F. Kennedy's assassin, as shown in the opening montage. In Watchmen: The End Is Nigh, the Comedian is voiced by Mark Silverman.

Due to his death in the graphic novel, he does not appear in the HBO sequel series Watchmen, but he is mentioned and his legacy lives on through his daughter Laurie. The Comedian is seen briefly in a flashback episode in which he is portrayed by an uncredited actor. According to a Peteypedia article, Lady Trieu's mother Bian My had encountered Blake during the Vietnam War in 1971, during which he and his battalion of Blazin' Commandos' burned down her village.

In Watchmen Chapter I, Comedian is voiced by Rick D. Wasserman.

=== Doctor Manhattan ===
Dr. Jonathan "Jon" Osterman is a vigilante and the only character with superpowers. His character was based on the Charlton Comics character Captain Atom. He was originally a physicist who was transformed into a blue, irradiated powerful being after he was disintegrated in an Intrinsic Field Subtractor in 1959. He had returned to the chamber to retrieve his girlfriend's watch (which he had repaired), and was accidentally locked inside when the Subtractor started automatically. Osterman was blown into atoms, with nothing left of his body. Within a few months, his disembodied consciousness managed to reconstruct a physical body for itself, after several hideous partial reconstructions. Following his reanimation, he is immediately pressed into service by the United States government, which gives him the name Doctor Manhattan, after the Manhattan Project. Though he dabbles briefly in crime-fighting, his greatest influence is to grant the U.S. a strategic advantage over the Soviet Union during the Cold War, with his most significant action taking place after he is personally asked by President Richard Nixon to intervene in the Vietnam War, leading to an unqualified victory for the U.S. with the defeat of North Vietnam and the Vietcong. This prevents the collapse of the Saigon government. Since he works for the U.S. government, he is exempt from the provisions of the Keene Act, but spends much of his time doing advanced technology research and development, and physics research. He is single-handedly responsible for the shift to electric-powered vehicles by synthesizing the needed elements and chemicals himself, causing a huge leap in many areas of science and technology. As a result, the technology of the alternative 1985 of the Watchmen universe is far more advanced. After the death of his father in 1969, he does not conceal his birth name and is referred to as "Jon" or "Dr. Osterman".

Perhaps due to his own transhumanist nature, Doctor Manhattan is not only able to perceive time as non-linear, with him often describing past, present and future events as though they were all happening within the time of his retelling of them, this also leads to him acting in accordance with a personal philosophy which most closely resembles determinism. While he can change reality to his will, he believes himself and all of his actions to be pre-determined. He therefore both does and does not possess free will and is, in a way, controlled by forces well within his control. He refuses to change the pre-ordained course of events.

In the Watchmen film, Doctor Manhattan is a CGI character whose body is modeled after fitness model Greg Plitt, with voice, motion capture, and facial performance provided by Billy Crudup (who also portrays Osterman prior to his transformation). In Watchmen: The End is Nigh, Doctor Manhattan is voiced by Crispin Freeman.

In the Watchmen TV series, he is portrayed by Yahya Abdul-Mateen II. For much of the series, he is solely known by the name Cal Abar, the husband of series protagonist Angela Abar and the survivor of an unnamed accident in 2009 which wiped his memory. In reality, Manhattan installed a device into his forehead that suppressed his superpowers and his omniscient sense of time, allowing him to pursue a comfortable relationship with Angela, though this did remove his memory prior to 2009. Late in the series, in 2019, Angela discovers a plot by the white supremacist ring the Seventh Kavalry to destroy Manhattan and harness his powers; Angela subsequently forcibly removed the device from his forehead, causing him to regain his abilities and appearance. Immediately afterward, Manhattan is captured by the Kavalry and transported into a synthetic lithium cage. As Senator Joe Keene, the Kavalry's leader, prepares to destroy Manhattan while harnessing his powers (ultimately killing Keene in the process since the machine didn't have a component that can filter the atomic energy), Lady Trieu intervenes, kills the rest of the Kavalry, and continues the demonstration in attempt to take his powers for herself so that she can do improvements to the world which Doctor Manhattan never got around to doing. Trieu is successful in killing Manhattan and he shares a final moment with Angela before he dies, though Trieu's plans are ultimately upended by Veidt and she is killed by another of his attacks. At the end of the series, Manhattan is implied to have transferred his powers to Angela.

In Watchmen Chapter I, Doctor Manhattan is voiced by Michael Cerveris.

=== Nite Owl ===
Nite Owl II (Daniel "Dan" Dreiberg) is a superhero who uses owl-themed gadgets, in a manner which led Dave Gibbons to consider him "an obsessive hobbyist... a comics fan, a fanboy." Nite Owl was partly based on the Ted Kord version of the DC Comics superhero Blue Beetle. Just as Ted Kord had a predecessor, Moore also incorporated an earlier adventurer who used the name "Nite Owl" (the retired crime fighter Hollis Mason) into Watchmen. While Moore devised character notes for Gibbons to work from, the artist provided a name and a costume design for Hollis Mason he had created when he was twelve. Richard Reynolds noted in Super Heroes: A Modern Mythology that despite the character's Charlton roots, Nite Owl's modus operandi has more in common with the DC Comics character Batman. According to Geoff Klock, his civilian form "visually suggests an impotent, middle-aged Clark Kent." The second Nite Owl is another vigilante who has not revealed his identity in the post-Keene Act era throughout the novel.

"Before Watchmen: Nite Owl #1" establishes that Dan Dreiberg's mother was physically abused by his father. Dreiberg's obsession with the original Nite Owl led him to plant a remote microphone device on Hollis' vehicle in order to track him down. It also establishes the events of how he was taken in as his apprentice: His father dies of an apparent heart attack while beating Dan's mother (Dan and his mother hold off calling for an ambulance) At the funeral, Hollis, having since discovered Dan's abusive childhood via police reports, confronts Dan and agrees to take him on as his sidekick. However, after training him, Hollis announces his retirement and informs Dan that he is giving him the Nite Owl identity rather than creating a sidekick persona for him. It is also revealed that Rorschach met Nite Owl on Dan's very first patrol and offered his assistance as a partner to the young rookie hero.

In the Watchmen film, he is portrayed by Patrick Wilson, who put on 25 pounds (11 kg) in between the filming of his flashback scenes and the 1985 scenes, showing the physical decline of his character.

He is not present in the HBO Watchmen series, having been under federal custody since the events of the graphic novel.

In the animated film Watchmen Chapter I, Nite Owl is voiced by Matthew Rhys.

=== Rorschach ===
Rorschach (real name Walter Joseph Kovacs) is a noir private detective-themed vigilante who wears a white mask with constantly shifting ink blots. Rorschach continues to fight crime in spite of his outlaw status, eventually making the FBI's Ten Most Wanted List. Born to an abusive prostitute and a man whose last name she never bothered to learn, he spent much of his childhood in a home for troubled youth, after which he began working in a garment factory. After reading about the murder of Kitty Genovese and the reported complete indifference of the witnesses of the crime, he modified a special fabric that she had ordered, according to him, to create a mask and became a vigilante, eventually forming a productive partnership with Nite Owl II. In 1975, after failing to rescue a young girl, he lost all faith in humanity.

Moore based Rorschach on the Steve Ditko creations the Question and Mr. A. Moore said he was trying to "come up with this quintessential Steve Ditko character—someone who's got a funny name, whose surname begins with a 'K,' who's got an oddly designed mask". As a result, Rorschach's real name is given as Walter Kovacs. Ditko's Charlton character the Question also served as a template for creating Rorschach. Comics historian Bradford W. Wright described the character's world view as "a set of black-and-white values that take many shapes but never mix into shades of gray, similar to the ink blot tests of his namesake". Rorschach sees existence as random and, according to Wright, this viewpoint leaves the character "free to 'scrawl [his] own design' on a 'morally blank world'". Moore said he did not foresee the death of Rorschach until the fourth issue when he realized that his refusal to compromise would result in him not surviving the story.

Rorschach is close friends with the second Nite Owl. He is the first hero Rorschach meets with when Comedian is killed and Nite Owl organizes a rescue mission to free Rorschach from jail when he is arrested. Before Watchmen: Nite Owl reveals that Rorschach was active as a hero before Nite Owl made his debut and on the latter's first night out as a hero, Rorschach sneaks into his owl ship and offers his services to Nite Owl as a partner.

In Doomsday Clock, Kovacs is succeeded by Reginald "Reggie" Long, son of Dr. Malcolm Long, the psychologist in Watchmen who was assigned to evaluate Rorschach after he is apprehended.

In the Watchmen film, he is portrayed by Jackie Earle Haley.

Due to his death in the graphic novel, he does not appear in the HBO sequel series Watchmen, but his legacy and likeness are depicted in the form of the Seventh Kavalry, a white supremacist ring that was formed after Rorschach's journal was published by right-wing paper the New Frontiersman. The Kavalry all wear Rorschach masks and are shown recording threatening videos in which they quote directly from Rorschach's journal. They know that Veidt orchestrated the squid attack and the plot to destroy Doctor Manhattan so that their leader Joe Keene Jr. can harness his powers. In the season finale "See How They Fly", Trey Butler is mistakenly credited as portraying Rorschach.

In the animated film Watchmen Chapter I, Rorschach is voiced by Titus Welliver.

=== Silk Spectre ===
Laurel Jane "Laurie" Juspeczyk (Silk Spectre) is the daughter of Sally Jupiter, the first Silk Spectre. Laurie's mother apparently wanted her to follow in her footsteps and so she fought crime for ten years before the Keene Act banned vigilantes. Unlike the other protagonists, Silk Spectre was not based on a particular Charlton character, although her relationship with Dr. Manhattan is similar to that between Captain Atom and the heroine Nightshade. Moore felt he needed a female hero in the cast and drew inspiration from comic book heroines such as Black Canary and Phantom Lady.

Laurie is kept on retainer by the government because of her relationship with Doctor Manhattan and lives on a government base at the beginning of the comic. When Doctor Manhattan leaves Earth, the government has her removed from the base and suspends her expense account, forcing her to move in with Dan, with whom she starts a romantic relationship. At the end of the eighth issue, Doctor Manhattan appears and takes her to Mars because he knows she wants to convince him to save the world. On Mars, she realizes that the Comedian was her biological father. After the final encounter with Veidt at the end of the series, she assumes the identity of Sandra Hollis and continues her relationship with Dan. An offhand comment to Dan, in which she claims to want a better costume, with leather and a sidearm, implies that she is thinking of taking up her father's role as the Comedian.

In the Watchmen film, she is portrayed by Malin Åkerman. In a 2003 draft script by David Hayter, which was reviewed by IGN, Laurie uses the name Jupiter, and the alter ego name "Slingshot". The former detail seems to have been retained in the final version of the film (though the Nite Owl's goggles gave her last name as her mother's maiden name, Juspeczyk). Silk Spectre was ranked 24th in Comics Buyer's Guide's "100 Sexiest Women in Comics" list.

In the television series, Laurie (portrayed by Jean Smart) has given up vigilantism and joined the FBI, becoming an agent in the Anti-Vigilante Task Force. On one mission, she and her co-workers posed as bank robbers at National Bank Inc. to draw out Mister Shadow. Though hinted to think of Dan where she owns a pet owl, it is heavily hinted she pines for Doctor Manhattan. She is sent to Tusla by Senator Joe Keene Jr., who apparently offered to have Dan released from prison, to investigate the death of Judd Crawford, but in reality she is meant to help the Seventh Kavalry locate Doctor Manhattan. She is present when Veidt manufactures another squid attack in an attempt to stop Lady Trieu from becoming a godlike entity, and ultimately arrests Veidt for his many crimes. While she does not have a crime-fighting alter ego anymore, this older, hardened version of Laurie nevertheless shows several parallels with her father the Comedian, having taken her father's last name, sharing his affinity for jokes as metaphors for her worldview, and having become an FBI agent after giving up vigilantism as the Comedian did before her.

In the animated film Watchmen Chapter I, Silk Spectre is voiced by Katee Sackhoff.

=== Adrian Veidt ===
Adrian Veidt, known as Ozymandias prior to the events of the graphic novel, is a former superhero who draws inspiration from his hero Alexander the Great and the Egyptian pharaoh Ramesses II, for whom he takes his superhero alias. A child prodigy, he graduated from high school and college before he was 18 and learned the art of lying as he hid the full scope of his brilliance for most of his childhood after being accused of cheating. When he inherited his family's fortune upon his parents' death in a car accident, Adrian gave it away to see if he could be a success by himself. Veidt traced Alexander the Great's path across the globe and ultimately returned to the United States, where he became a successful businessman. However, when his business partner and would-be love interest overdosed on drugs (purchased with funds given to her by Adrian as a gift to allow her to have fun in New York City one night), Veidt decided to avenge her death as a superhero. His costume was conceived as a Halloween costume but he quickly developed a name for himself as a hero. Two years before the Keene Act passed, Veidt went public with his secret identity and began merchandising his alter ego as he became one of the most important businessmen in the USA. However, his fear of a nuclear war between the USSR and the US, plus a rivalry with the Comedian (who unknowingly planted the idea of stopping the inevitable nuclear holocaust into Veidt's head), led to him engaging in the vast conspiracy at the heart of the Watchmen series.

Ozymandias was directly based on Peter Cannon, Thunderbolt, whom Moore had admired for using his full brain capacity as well as possessing full physical and mental control. Veidt is believed to be the smartest man on the planet, even capable of outsmarting Dr Manhattan. His combination of intelligence and highly advanced fighting skills makes him perhaps the most feared and dangerous of the mortal vigilantes. He was even able to catch a bullet fired at him (Chapter XII, page 15). He is often accompanied by his genetically engineered lynx, Bubastis. Richard Reynolds noted that by taking initiative to "help the world", Veidt displays a trait normally attributed to villains in superhero stories, and in a sense he is the "villain" of the series; however, he purposely acts for an objective greater good, thus avoiding the traditional "villain" classification, which is typically self-serving, delusional or evil. Gibbons noted "One of the worst of his sins [is] kind of looking down on the rest of humanity, scorning the rest of humanity." In 2008, he was ranked number 10 on the Forbes Fictional 15. Wizard magazine also ranked Ozymandias as 25th-greatest villain of all time and IGN ranked him as 21st-greatest comic book villain of all time.

In the Watchmen film, Veidt is portrayed by Matthew Goode. His costume was designed to parody the rubber suits featuring nipples in the film Batman & Robin. This incarnation of Veidt uses a German accent when speaking with friends and an American accent when speaking publicly. Instead of breeding a giant monster and placing it in New York to massacre half the city as in the comics, Veidt destroys New York, along with many major cities across the globe, with energy blasts designed to look as though Doctor Manhattan had caused it, bringing world peace.

In the television series, Veidt is portrayed by Jeremy Irons. In the years since 1985, he continued to run his companies and helped to advance technology beyond those of Doctor Manhattan, which the world feared due to its ties with cancer. However, Veidt became a recluse, and sometime before 2019, Veidt is reported to have died with his company acquired by Lady Trieu, revealed to be his daughter through artificial insemination. Veidt spent much of the time since 1985 in Karnak, using the same teleportation device used for the squid to send storms of smaller squids randomly across the earth as to hold up the pretense of an alien invasion and ward off further international conflict. To his dismay, the world did not become the utopia he hoped to oversee, and in 2009, he took Doctor Manhattan's offer to be transported to a closed ecosystem Manhattan had created on Europa to be adored by clones of two servants, Phillips and Crookshanks. Initially pleasing, Veidt soon became bored and instructed the first Phillips to become an adversary to him, the Game Warden. The Seventh Kavalry had somehow obtained pre-recorded footage that Veidt made in the event that Robert Redford became President of the United States. Over the next eight years, Veidt was able to briefly escape the ecosystem to leave a message to Lady Trieu for rescue, which comes in the form of an automated craft. For the trip back to Earth, Trieu turned him into a gold statue, having him revert to his human state years later so that he could witness her destruction of Manhattan and attempted harnessing of his powers. Transported back to his lair in Antarctica by Manhattan, Veidt uses his squid teleportation device to attack Tulsa so that he can stop Trieu from becoming a god. He is successful, only to be arrested by Wade Tillman and Laurie Blake.

In the animated film Watchmen Chapter I, Veidt is voiced by Troy Baker.

== Minor characters ==
Moore stated in 1988 that, in Watchmen, "we spend a good deal of time with the people on the street. We wanted to spend as much time detailing these characters and making them believable as we did the main characters." Moore and Gibbons deliberately wanted all their characters "to have a place in this vast organic mechanism that we call the world." The fleshing-out of the world was, in Moore's words, to demonstrate that "all the way through the entire series human life is going on with all of its petty entanglements and minor difficulties and all the rest of it." Moore adds that it is possible to see the story as being as much about the supporting as the main characters:

What Nixon does and what Dr. Manhattan does and what Veidt does—it affects the people on the street corner but only peripherally, indirectly... And yet, in some ways, those people on the street corner, it's their story. They're the people we're concerned about.

=== Minutemen ===
The Minutemen are a superhero group that came before the Crimebusters. The group was founded in 1939 during the Golden Age. The group later disbanded in 1949 following some public controversies. Moore loosely based the Minutemen on the Mighty Crusaders. Among its notable members are:

==== Captain Metropolis ====
Captain Metropolis (real name Nelson Forrest Gardner) is a former Marine Lieutenant. He was one of the more active members of the Minutemen, having organized its formation. Metropolis was involved in a sexual relationship with Hooded Justice. The relationship was reported to be abusive, with Hooded Justice abusing and cheating on Metropolis until H.J.'s mysterious disappearance in the early 1950s. In the 1960s, the Captain unsuccessfully attempted to recruit the second generation of superheroes into a new group called the Crimebusters. He was killed in a car accident in 1974 that left him decapitated.

He was portrayed in the film by Darryl Scheelar.

Two versions of the character appeared in the HBO series. One was portrayed by Chris Whitley as a fictionalized character in the series' show-within-the-show "American Hero Story: Minutemen", which details his relationship and affair with Hooded Justice. The real Captain Metropolis, seen in the episode "This Extraordinary Being", was portrayed by Jake McDorman. In this episode, Nelson Gardner finds the identity of Hooded Justice and recruits him to the Minutemen as well as developing a secret affair with him. However, their alliance is superficial as Nelson is more preoccupied with the Minutemen's publicity than earnest crimefighting. When Will Reeves / Hooded Justice discovers the location of the white supremacist group Cyclops, Nelson declines to rally the support of the Minutemen, telling Will "black unrest" is his issue to deal with. Gardner's last will and testament, published on the tie-in website Peteypedia, reveals that he died in regret and bequeathed his estate and property to Will, where he is still living in 2009.

Gardener appears in the animated film Watchmen Chapter I, voiced by Corey Burton.

==== Dollar Bill ====
Dollar Bill (real name William Benjamin "Bill" Brady) is a bank-sponsored member of the Minutemen who was created by National Bank Inc. for publicity purposes. While he is described as having no actual superpowers, Dollar Bill was known for having apparently supernatural luck, surviving many things that should have outright killed him. Socially conservative, he is portrayed in Before Watchmen as homophobic (barely tolerating his homosexual Minutemen colleagues) and good friends with the ultra-right-wing Comedian, voting to let him stay after the attempted rape of Sally Jupiter. He dies during a bank robbery at National Bank Inc. in 1947 when his cape is caught in the bank's revolving doors, allowing the robbers to shoot him at point-blank range.

In the film, he is portrayed by Dan Payne.

In the first episode of the TV series, a racist poster depicting Dollar Bill is seen in one of the hideouts of the Seventh Kavalry. The same poster appears in the sixth episode as a part of the Minutemen's promotional materials.

==== Hollis Mason ====
Hollis Mason is the first Nite Owl who retired in 1962, and author of the autobiography "Under The Hood" which appears in excerpts throughout the story. Hollis was the only member of the Minutemen who did not have any social problems and mainly enjoyed being a costumed adventurer. On Halloween 1985, The Knot-Tops led by Derf assault Hollis in retaliation for the release of Rorschach, which was caused by Nite Owl II (Daniel Dreiberg) and Silk Spectre II (Laurie Juspeczyk). Derf hits Hollis on the head with Mason's own Nite Owl trophy killing the former superhero (in the film, this event is only depicted in the director's cut version). Hollis' death was avenged when Derf is among those killed by Ozymandias' giant monster.

Before Watchmen: Night Owl #1 showed that Dan Dreiberg's obsession with the original Nite Owl led him to plant a remote microphone device on Hollis' vehicle in order to track him down. At the funeral of Dreiberg's father, Hollis discovered Dan's abusive childhood via police reports. He confronted Dan and agrees to take him on as his sidekick. After training Dan, Hollis instead announced his retirement and granted Dan the Nite Owl identity, rather than creating a sidekick persona for him.

In the film, he is portrayed in old age by Stephen McHattie and in youth by Clint Carleton.

In the animated film Watchmen Chapter I, Mason is voiced by Geoff Pierson.

==== Hooded Justice ====
Hooded Justice is the first masked vigilante, often initialled "H. J." by his teammates. His real identity is never conclusively revealed but in Hollis Mason's book it is suggested to be circus strongman Rolf Müller.

This is retconned heavily in Before Watchmen: Minutemen #6, where we learn that he is not Rolf Müller (a character that sexually abused and killed children), but it is strongly implied that he is Müller's son or ward, Jacob. Assuming that he himself was a victim of Müller's abuse, it explains a great deal about his violent persona, costume, and mask. A violent vigilante, Hooded Justice shared a romantic homosexual relationship with Captain Metropolis and a deep-seated rivalry with Comedian, after he prevented Blake from sexually assaulting Silk Spectre. Hooded Justice's relationship with Metropolis was a fractured one; Justice repeatedly cheated on his boyfriend with male prostitutes, physically abusing them in sadomasochist sexual encounters. This resulted in bribery of his lovers and the usage of Silk Spectre as his public girlfriend. He ultimately disappeared in the 1950s after refusing to cooperate with HUAC's new policy on costumed vigilantes. In the original novel it is suggested that he was murdered either by the Comedian for voting him out of the Minutemen (as Ozymandias believes), or by the Stasi of his native East Germany. In the retcon we learn that Hollis Mason, mistakenly believing him to be Müller, attacked Hooded Justice and snapped his neck, killing him. He was never actually unmasked, and Metropolis burned down the headquarters with his former lover's body inside; it later turns out that the Comedian was the one who misdirected Mason to believe that Justice was Müller, so Ozymandias was partially right. Much of the "Under the Hood" information on Müller and H. J. is revealed to be a deliberate lie on Mason's part. This may be contrary to the intent of the original novel. In chapter 1, the fourth panel of page 25 focuses on two old men sitting affectionately together near Dan and Laurie in Rafael's restaurant. They look very much like older versions of Rolf Müller and Nelson Gardner, and it was speculated by many fans that these were in fact Hooded Justice and Captain Metropolis, who had faked their deaths in order to retire and be together. Dave Gibbons said this was unintended but allowed that it might be true. In the retconned world of Before Watchmen, it is obviously not the case.

In the film, Hooded Justice was portrayed by Glenn Ennis.

In the TV series, Hooded Justice is revealed to have been Will Reeves (portrayed by Louis Gossett Jr. as an old man and Jovan Adepo as a young man), a black man who had escaped from the 1921 Tulsa race massacre. He became one of the first black officers in the New York City police force. After stumbling into a plot by the Ku Klux Klan called "Cyclops" which sought to incite violence between black people, Reeves was nearly lynched by white officers as a warning to stay out of their business. While still wearing the noose and hood, Reeves helped a young couple fend off thugs that were trying to rob them, and his deed named him a hero the next day. Reeves took up the name Hooded Justice, using the costume to mask his race. He was invited into the Minutemen by Captain Metropolis, but cautioned from revealing his race to the other members. When Reeves found further clues to "Cyclops" including the use of hypnotic strobe effects to coerce black people into violence, the Minutemen refused to help, and Reeves took it on himself to end the New York City operation. This led to Reeves becoming disillusioned to his role, staying behind when his wife and son returned to Tulsa. In 2019, Reeves reveals himself to Angela, his granddaughter, and uses a modified version of the Cyclops hypnosis effect to chase down those with association with Cyclops. When Angela restores Doctor Manhattan's memories, he sends their adopted children to Reeves where they were when Veidt caused frozen squids to rain down on Lady Trieu and her followers. Will even wrote out a speech for Lady Trieu to read to the Seventh Kavalry and the Cyclops leadership. In addition within the fictional show-within-a-show American Hero Story, a mock version of Hooded Justice is portrayed by Cheyenne Jackson.

In the animated film Watchmen Chapter I, Hooded Justice is voiced by John Marshall Jones.

==== Mothman ====
Mothman (real name Byron Alfred Lewis) is a former member of the Minutemen who suffered from alcoholism and mental illness later in life. Lewis had a privileged upbringing and sought to help the less fortunate and fight oppression and corruption as a crimefighter. To this end, Lewis created a costume with special wings that helped him glide, dubbing himself "Mothman". However, a series of near death experiences in perfecting his wings left Lewis in constant pain, a drug addict and an alcoholic, with him requiring a drink each time before he flew for "courage". Lewis' mental stability ultimately deteriorated after he was called before HUAC, leading to him being forcibly committed to a mental asylum in Maine, but was briefly released for the Minutemen's reunion.

In Doomsday Clock #2, the obituary in the newspaper reveals that Mothman is dead. In Doomsday Clock #4, a flashback involving the earlier history of Reggie reveals that he met Mothman at the same asylum following the alien monster's attack. Reggie and Mothman grow closer as Mothman plans to train Reggie to defend himself against the guard Jason. When Reggie sees the news that exposed Veidt's involvement with the alien monster attack, he sets fire to the asylum. When Mothman sees the fire, he states that it is calling to him and walks towards (and presumably into) it. Mothman is also notoriously stinky.

In the film, he is portrayed by Niall Matter.

In the TV series, he is portrayed by Brennan Kerr.

==== Sally Jupiter ====
Sally Jupiter (real name Sally Juspeczyk) is the first Silk Spectre and founding member of the Minutemen who is now retired. She is later the domineering "stage mom" of Laurie Juspeczyk (who becomes Silk Spectre II). Sally married her manager, Laurence Schexnayder, shortly after retiring. She narrowly avoided being raped by the Comedian, although years later she had a consensual affair with him, and ultimately bore his child. Sally adores the attention she receives from fans of "The Silk Spectre", though Laurie is repulsed at her mother's sexually explicit exploits in promoting herself.

In the film, she is portrayed by Carla Gugino.

In the animated film Watchmen Chapter I, Sally is voiced by Adrienne Barbeau.

==== Silhouette ====
The Silhouette (real name Ursula Zandt) was a gun-toting vigilante and member of the Minutemen. Before Watchmen gave a new backstory, that Ursula was motivated by the deaths of her parents and sister at the hands of the Nazis in their native Austria. According to the first Nite Owl, Silhouette was the first member of the Minutemen who went public with her career as a super-hero, when she busted a child pornography ring in New York. She had a close working relationship with Nite Owl and, after being forced out of the Minutemen (upon being publicly outed as a lesbian), continued to work with Nite Owl. She investigated a string of child murders until she and her lover Gretchen were killed by The Liquidator, a criminal she had fought years earlier as seen in Before Watchmen: Minutemen #4. In the film, the words "lesbian whores" scrawled on the wall at the scene of her murder implied that her killer was motivated by homophobia and not necessarily revenge.

She is portrayed by Apollonia Vanova in the film.

=== Adversaries ===
The following are villains in Watchmen:

==== Big Figure ====
Big Figure (real name Tom Ryan) is jailed dwarfish crime lord and former adversary of Nite Owl and Rorschach. He tries to get revenge when Rorschach is imprisoned in the same prison as he is, only for him and his minions to be killed by Rorschach during a prison riot.

In the film, he is portrayed by an uncredited Danny Woodburn.

In the animated film he is voiced by Phil Fondacaro.

==== Captain Carnage ====
Captain Carnage showed up in New York City around 1976 and began attempting to entice costumed adventurers into beating him.

Carnage would pretend to be a supervillain in order to get beaten up, constantly yelling things like "Punish me!" Carnage once devised an elaborate fake theft ring that continued on for months, eventually ending when Silk Spectre II discovered the clues to his location he had planted at the scene of his crimes and crashed his "hideout" – a mirrored room in SoHo with soft music playing and flashing red lights on the walls. When she attacked Carnage, she noticed that he was turned on by the beating. He started following Nite Owl II, only to be ignored. He tried the same thing on Rorschach, who dropped Carnage down an elevator shaft, killing him.

Captain Carnage is only mentioned in passing when Laurie and Daniel are talking on the rooftop garden of Rafael's restaurant, reminiscing about the past. It is possible that the purpose of the character is to prefigure Laurie and Daniel's sexual frustration when in their normal roles, only being able to function when they are dressed and acting as superheroes.

==== Moloch the Mystic ====
Moloch the Mystic (real name Edgar William "Eddie" Jacobi, also known as Edgar William Vaughn, and William Edgar Bright) is a crime lord who fought the Minutemen and other superheroes for several decades. Moloch was jailed for a time during the 1970s, after which he retired from crime. In Watchmen, he is dying of cancer, which he received from Adrian Veidt. Moloch is later murdered by Adrian, who frames Rorschach.

Supplementary materials for the television series reveal that Moloch was the longest active supervillain and ran a series of crime syndicates, all of which were destroyed in 1958 by Ozymandias after he had first become a vigilante, which is heavily implied to have been a factor in Moloch's jail time and subsequent retirement.

In the film, he is primarily portrayed by Matt Frewer, with Mike Carpenter playing Moloch as a younger man in various flashbacks.

In the animated film Watchmen Chapter I, Moloch is voiced by Jeffrey Combs.

==== Twilight Lady ====
Twilight Lady (real name Elizabeth "Liz" Lane) is a dominatrix-styled villain of Nite Owl II, seen only in an autographed photograph and erotic dream sequence in the original novel. The character has two completely different origins in later material written by other writers.

In the video game Watchmen: The End is Nigh (set in the 1970s), Twilight Lady (voiced by Courtenay Taylor) is established as a madam whose clients include many high-profile Washington politicians, whom she blackmails for state secrets and money. In the game, Nite Owl II and Rorschach must fight her at the end, before fighting each other over her fate; if Rorschach wins, he shoots her through a window, killing her, while if Nite Owl wins, Rorschach vanishes after falling while Nite Owl threatens her into leaving town and never returning.

Before Watchmen: Nite Owl portrays her as a dominatrix who befriends Nite Owl II when a fight between Dan and a crook spills over into her place of work. Falling for the hero and inspired by his heroic actions, she adopts the "Sin Queen" alias and becomes a super-hero, investigating a series of prostitute murders along with Nite Owl and a jealous Rorschach. The murderer of the prostitutes turns out to be a fire and brimstone minister whom Rorschach is friends with; Nite Owl rescues the Sin Queen, whom the minister kidnaps and threatens to burn alive. The near death experience causes her to give up her would-be career as a hero. Dan lied to Laurie about her being a former lover of his, and passed her off as a criminal who was fixated on him to hide their relationship.

=== Other characters ===
==== Alien Monster ====
The Alien Monster (referred to by fans as the Squid) is a 100-foot, giant squid-like monster with one eye and an exposed brain. It was created by Ozymandias (Adrian Veidt) as part of his plan to avert a nuclear holocaust. Veidt had invited science fiction writers Max Shea and James Trafford March, surreal artist Hira Manish, and an assortment of other writers, artists, and scientists to his private island under the impression that they were taking part in a top secret movie production. Genetically engineering the monster took several months; its brain was the cloned brain of deceased psychic Robert Deschaines, augmented by a psychic resonance device. Once completed, Veidt had the ship that was transporting the artists home blown up to hide his involvement in the events. At midnight on November 2, 1985, Veidt teleports the Alien Monster to the heart of New York City, unleashing a massive psychic shockwave that kills millions of people.

In the film, the Alien Monster was replaced with exploding energy reactors that generate a radioactive decay signature similar to Doctor Manhattan as a way to frame him for the retaliated attack in light of the cancer allegations against him.

In the TV series, it is shown that "squidfalls", unexplained meteorological occurrences in which thousands of smaller alien monsters fall from the sky, occur around the world as late as 2019. These are revealed to be the continuing work of Adrian Veidt, believing them necessary to maintain fear of the "aliens" and thereby world peace.

==== Bernard ====
Bernard is a newsdealer who appears periodically on the central New York street corner. Bernard is amongst the many characters who dies when Veidt's monster appears in New York, and he dies trying to protect his young namesake. Moore has stated that he "is in some ways every man, because he's a complete prat and doesn't know what's going on... [h]e is like a lot of people, he is a function of the news... [regurgitating news headlines] think[ing] that's an opinion."

In the animated film Watchmen Chapter I, Bernard is voiced by Max Koch.

==== Bubastis ====
Bubastis is a genetically altered red lynx with stripes that was created by Ozymandias to serve as his sole companion. When meeting with a toy company, Adrian Veidt asked for the toy company to make a toy of Bubastis as well. When Doctor Manhattan was lured into the intrinsic field subtractor, Veidt regretfully apologizes to Bubastis and turns on the machine which kills Bubastis and temporarily disassembles Doctor Manhattan.

In the sequel "Doomsday Clock", Ozymandias clones Bubastis in his plot to find Doctor Manhattan in the DC Universe.

In the film, Bubastis has blue fur.

==== Doug Roth ====
Doug Roth is a reporter for Nova Express. He is present at Dr. Manhattan's interview with Ted Koppel and reveals that several of his coworkers died of cancer, presumably from Manhattan. This leads to Manhattan's self-imposed exile on Mars.

Roth is portrayed by John Shaw in the film.

In the animated movie Watchmen Chapter I, Roth is voiced by Jason Spisak.

==== Gloria Long ====
The wife of Malcolm Long and mother of Reggie, the second Rorschach. She dies in the New York massacre caused by Ozymandias' alien monster.

==== Wally Weaver ====
Wallace "Wally" Weaver is a scientist and Dr. Jon Osterman's best friend. Veidt gives Wally cancer as part of his scheme to exile Doctor Manhattan.

In the film, Wally is voiced by Rob LaBelle.

In the animated film Watchmen Chapter I, Wally is voiced by Yuri Lowenthal.

==== Janey Slater ====
Janey Slater is the first girlfriend of Dr. Jon Osterman. She leaves him in 1966 after she perceives a relationship building between Osterman and Laurie. Veidt gives Janey cancer as part of his scheme to exile Doctor Manhattan. Janey erroneously believes that Jon Osterman gave it to her.

In the live action film, Janey is portrayed by Laura Mennell.

In the animated film Watchmen Chapter I, Janet is voice by Kari Wahlgren.

==== Detective Joe Bourquin ====
Detective Joe Bourquin is the partner to Detective Steven Fine. Bourquin dies when Veidt's monster appears in New York.

In the film, he is renamed Detective Gallagher and is portrayed by Don Thompson.

In the animated film Watchmen Chapter I, Bourquin is voiced by Max Koch.

==== John David Keene ====
John David Keene Sr. is a Senator who is responsible for the Keene Act, which banned superheroes that were not government-sanctioned.

In the TV series, he is portrayed by Ted Johnson. Now an old man and using a wheelchair, Keene is present at his son Joe Keene's plans to inherit Doctor Manhattan's powers. Laurie comments that she did not suspect that Keene Sr. would be part of Cyclops. After Joe Keene is turned into ooze because he did not have a component in the machine he used that would filter the atomic energy, Keene Sr., the rest of the Seventh Kavalry, and the Cyclops leadership are all vaporized by Lady Trieu where Keene Sr.'s wheelchair is left behind.

==== Malcolm Long ====
Malcolm Long, Ph.D. is the psychologist who is assigned to evaluate Rorschach after he is apprehended. He is initially very hopeful of curing Rorschach, even though his utter lack of emotion makes Long's psychological evaluation techniques useless. Rorschach's unveiling of events that shaped his uncompromising mindset greatly affects Dr. Long's own outlook and marriage. Malcolm and his wife die when Veidt's monster appears in New York.

In Doomsday Clock, Malcolm has a son named Reggie who became the second Rorschach.

In the film, he is portrayed by William S. Taylor.

In the animated film he is voice by John Marshall Jones

==== Seymour David ====
Seymour David is a junior worker at the New Frontiersman magazine offices, designed by Moore to be "the ordinary common slob". He is the final character in Watchmen, playing a pivotal role in the final pages, whom Moore describes as "the most low-life, worthless, nerdy sort of character in the entire book who finally has the fate of the world resting in his pudging fingers".

When a planned article for the New Frontiersman has to be scrapped, the editor leaves it up to Seymour to find something usable in the magazine's "crank file" submissions, which include Rorschach's journal. It is revealed in Doomsday Clock #1 that the journal was published and that Seymour was "brutally beaten to death" afterward.

In the film, Seymour is portrayed by Chris Gauthier.

In the animated film he is voice by Yuri Lowenthal.

==== Detective Steven Fine ====
Detective Steven Fine is the police officer that investigates Edward Blake's murder, and captures Rorschach. He deduces that Dan Dreiberg is Nite Owl II, and hints at this to Dreiberg in an effort to warn him away from further activity. Fine dies when Veidt's monster appears in New York.

Supplementary materials for the television series reveal that the investigation of Blake's murder, Rorschach, and Dreiberg were abandoned after Fine was killed during the attack.

He is portrayed by Jerry Wasserman in the film.

In Watchmen Chapter I, Fine is voiced by Dwight Schultz.

== Television series ==
The HBO television series is set after the events of the original limited series comic, taking place in 2019 in and around Tulsa, Oklahoma.

=== Sister Night ===
Sister Night (portrayed by Regina King as an adult, Faithe Herman as a child) is the masked identity of Angela Abar. Angela was born in Vietnam, shortly before it became the 51st state. Her parents were killed by a suicide bomber and her grandmother June came to bring her to the continental United States only to suffer a heart attack.

In 2009, she met Doctor Manhattan in Vietnam where he asked her on a date and informed her they would fall in love. Due to her hatred of Manhattan and skepticism of his identity, she initially refuses to believe him but nonetheless goes on the date with him to humor him; they quickly fall in love and he assumes the physical form of the deceased Calvin Jelani so that they can be together in public. When Angela grows frustrated with Manhattan's omniscient view of time, they agree to install a device into his forehead that suppresses his supernatural abilities, though this also temporarily removes his memories. Following the implementation of the device, Angela tells Manhattan that his name is Cal Abar and that he has suffered amnesia following an accident. Together, they move to Tulsa, where Angela joins the Tulsa Police Department.

On Christmas Eve 2015, Angela and Cal were attacked by members of the Seventh Kavalry, a white supremacist group who were upset at the police's enforcement of special reparations for victims of racial injustice stemming from the Tulsa race massacre in 1921. Angela survived the attack, but learned from her superior Chief Judd Crawford that the homes of 39 other officers were attacked, and of those that survived, only Angela and Judd were staying on the force.

To protect officers, a law was passed to require officers to disavow their profession and disguise themselves. Angela opted to take up the Sister Night costume, itself inspired by the fictional blaxploitation 70s film Sister Night: The Nun with the Motherf%&$ing Gun. Her outfit consists of black spraypaint going across her eye areas, a black nun's habit, a black balaclava going over her nose and mouth, a white shirt, black trousers, and long black boots with heels. In her day-to-day life, Angela is a baker who runs a bakery called "Milk and Hanoi" where the sign on it still says "Opening Soon". She and Cal also adopted three children whose parents were killed during White Night.

When Veidt manufactures another squid attack to upend Trieu's plans to harness Manhattan's powers, killing her in the process, Angela finds safety in a local theater, where Will Reeves has taken her kids. She shares a moment of clarity with Will and she finally accepts him as her grandfather, allowing him to stay with them as they take her children home. Her oldest son Topher learns at this time that she is Sister Night. When she arrives home, Angela realizes that Manhattan may have transferred his powers into an egg, which she proceeds to eat.

=== Judd Crawford ===
Judd Crawford (portrayed by Don Johnson) was the chief of the Tulsa Police Department. During his tenure, Judd was also the leader of a separate KKK-eqsue cell of the secret white supremacist, domestic terrorist organization Cyclops. Judd conspired with Senator Joe Keene to orchestrate the "White Night", an event that resulted in Tulsa police officers and their families being killed in their homes where the ones that were sleeping in bed took the brunt of the attacks. Judd had to make it look like that he was attacked. After the incident, Keene passed a new law which forced police officers to wear masks, partly to protect the identities of officers and appear "tough on crime", while secretly fomenting public mistrust of the police. Following one of the fights with the Seventh Kavalry, Judd was hypnotized by Will Reeves to hang himself.

Judd's death allowed Senator Keene to invite Laurie Blake to Tulsa to investigate, secretly luring her there for his own purposes. While Sister Night discovered Judd's connection with the KKK, Looking Glass learned from Keene Jr. that Judd led the police department on Joe's behalf while Joe led the Seventh Kavalry. It is revealed in the final episode that after the White Night event, Judd and his wife discerned that Cal was actually Doctor Manhattan and purposely got close to the Abar family so he could help the Kavalry in their plot to destroy Manhattan.

=== Looking Glass ===
Looking Glass (portrayed by Tim Blake Nelson as an adult, Phil Labes as a teenager) is the masked identity of Wade Tillman. Wade was a Jehovah's Witness from Tulsa, visiting Hoboken, New Jersey, on the night of November 2, 1985, to try to preach to the crowds there. A female member of the Knot Top Gang lured him into a hall of mirrors with the promise of sex, but instead ran off with his clothes except for his shoes and socks. Before he could give chase, psychic waves from the appearance of the alien monster in New York City shook the area, and Wade found himself one of the few survivors. This left Wade with a post-traumatic stress disorder, leaving him fearful of squids, building a bunker in his backyard, and pushing him towards isolation. Though he married Carolyn, they split after about seven years due to Wade's stress, though they remain on amicable terms.

Wade, normally a focus group analyst for an advertising agency, joined the Tulsa police as Looking Glass, wearing a fully reflective mask made of material purportedly able to protect him from psychic waves. As Looking Glass, he uses his "Pod", a small chamber with various screens on its walls, to interrogate subjects: he flashes various images on the screens to judge their responses.

=== Red Scare ===
Red Scare (portrayed by Andrew Howard) is a robust communist member of the Tulsa Police Department who wears a predominantly red outfit consisting of a red ski mask, a red jacket, and a red trainer pants. Not much is known about his past. Red Scare named his alias after the real "Red Scare", which saw the United States gripped in fear of Communism and communist sympathizers in the nation. Red Scare is often seen paired with Pirate Jenny.

=== Panda ===
Panda (portrayed by Jacob Ming-Trent) is a desk cop for the Tulsa Police Department who wears a giant panda mask that covers his face except for his jaw area where the panda mask's lower jaw should be.

=== Pirate Jenny ===
Pirate Jenny (portrayed by Jessica Camacho) is a member of the Tulsa Police Department who wears a pirate-themed outfit. She is often seen paired with Red Scare.

=== Dale Petey ===
Dale Petey (portrayed by Dustin Ingram) is an FBI Agent who accompanies Laurie Blake in her investigation in Judd Crawford's murder. Having a Doctorate in Superhero History, he has a profound knowledge of the history of the Minutemen and the Crimebusters, and his writings on the matter have filled in much of the show's backstory via the HBO subsite "Peteypedia".

Petey is all but directly confirmed to be Lube Man, a costumed vigilante that wears a skin-tight suit and able to cover himself in an oily substance to escape from Angela in "If You Don't Like My Story, Write Your Own", based on "Peteypedia" material related to Petey's dismissal from the FBI after the end of the events in the series.

According to showrunner Damon Lindelof, Lube Man was introduced as "just going to be a scene in episode 4 that's in the midst of other insane things happening" and did not expect the character or his identity to take off in popularity with fans of the show, pointing readers to Peteypedia "to reach the obvious conclusion" to his identity.

=== Mr. Phillips ===
Mr. Phillips (portrayed by Tom Mison) is a series of male clones that serve Adrian Veidt on Europa. They were cloned from the original Mr. Phillips that knew a younger Jon Osterman. When one clone dies, their bodies would be made use of by Veidt and a new clone will be grown in their place.

==== Game Warden ====
The Game Warden (portrayed by Tom Mison) is a powerful and masked clone of Mr. Phillips that was made to antagonize Adrian Veidt. His presence was first seen when fires a warning shot towards Veidt after he shot an American bison and later sent a letter of warning to him.

The Game Warden was fully seen when he busts Veidt for having left the area of Europa. He places him under arrest and quotes "May god have mercy on your soul." Adrian quotes that their god left them years ago.

The Game Warden had placed Adrian on trial where he was found guilty before a jury of his peers which happened to be pigs. He then subjected Adrian to public humiliation.

When Veidt gets out of his prison thanks to a horseshoe hidden in a cake by one of the servants, he makes his way towards Lady Trieu's rocket. The Game Warden tries to stop him only to be killed when Veidt stabs him with the horseshoe. Before dying, the Game Warden asks Veidt if he was a worthy opponent. Veidt just tells him "No. But you put on a hell of a show!"

=== Mrs. Crookshanks ===
Mrs. Crookshanks (portrayed by Sara Vickers) is a series of female clones that serve Adrian Veidt on Europa. They were cloned from the original Mrs. Crookshanks that knew a younger Jon Osterman. When one clone dies, their bodies would be made use of by Veidt and a new clone will be grown in their place.

=== Christopher Abar ===
Christopher "Topher" Abar (portrayed by Dylan Schombing) is the adopted son of Angela and Cal Abar. They took him in after his biological parents the Doyles were killed during the White Night.

=== Rosie Abar ===
Rosie Abar (portrayed by Lily Rose Smith) is the older adopted daughter of Angela and Cal Abar. They took her in after her biological parents the Doyles were killed during the White Night.

=== Emma Abar ===
Emma Abar (portrayed by Adelynn Spoon) is the younger adopted daughter of Angela and Cal Abar. They took her in after her biological parents the Doyles were killed during the White Night.

=== Lady Trieu ===
Lady Trieu (portrayed by Hong Chau) is a scientist and the owner of Trieu Industries which bought out Veidt Enterprises following news of Adrian Veidt's "death". Trieu is the daughter of Adrian Veidt after her mother Bian, in a show of defiance against Veidt, inseminated herself with one of Veidt's own sperm samples without his knowledge. Trieu is highly intelligent due to Veidt's genetics, and calls herself the "smartest woman on Earth."

Trieu came up with a means to capture Doctor Manhattan's powers in a quantum centrifuge, but was rebuffed by Veidt when she approached him for financial help in 2008. Instead, she established Trieu Enterprises, not only making it a trillion-dollar company, but using it as a front to construct her quantum centrifuge in Tulsa as the "Millennium Clock." During this time, she had expected to find Manhattan on Europa, but discovered a message from Veidt there and sent an automated craft to recover him and bring him to Earth by 2019 when her plan was to be completed. Lady Trieu has also created a clone of her mother Bian to assist her. Through Will Reeves, Lady Trieu learned of Manhattan's identity on Earth as Cal Abar, husband to Angela. She also learned the Seventh Kavalry had discovered this as well and planned to capture Manhattan themselves and Will asks for her help to wipe the Kavalry and Cyclops out.

As Trieu's quantum centrifuge activates following the Seventh Kavalry's capture of Manhattan, Trieu teleports the Kavalry, Manhattan, Angela, Laurie, and Wade to downtown Tulsa with Bian and Veidt in attendance as her men use their special shields to disarm the Seventh Kavalry of their weapons. When the ooze that used to be Joe Keene emerged from the machine, Lady Trieu stated that they didn't add a component to the machine to filter the atomic energies which can have that effect on anyone. After briefly reading a speech written to her by Will Reeves, she vaporized the Kavalry alongside the Cyclops leadership and triggers the centrifuge as Jane Crawford predicted. Manhattan teleports Veidt, Laurie, and Wade to Karnak, where they use Veidt's squid-rain-making device to send frozen squid projectiles in the immediate area. Though Trieu is able to destroy Manhattan before this, the squids destroy the centrifuge and kill Trieu before the transfer of power can be complete.

==== Bian My ====
Bian My (portrayed by Jolie Hoang-Rappaport) is the "daughter" of Lady Trieu. In reality when she speaks with a recuperating Angela, Lady Trieu states that Bian is actually a younger clone of her mother, and has received some of the memories of Trieu's mother through Trieu's technology.

The original Bian named Bian My (portrayed by Elyse Dinh) was once a cleaning lady of Adrian Veidt, present for his creation of the "Squid" in 1985. She inseminated herself with Veidt's sperm and escaped from Karnak as a sign of retribution against Veidt as seen in a flashback. According to a Peteypedia article, Bian My had encountered Comedian during the Vietnam War in 1971 in which he and his battalion of Blazin' Commandos' burned down her village. This would explain why her clone has recurring nightmares of that event.

When Veidt was freed from his gold encasing by Trieu, he saw Bian and noted that she cloned her own mother. She accompanied her mother to her plot. When Lady Trieu teleported everyone to her, Bian gave Lady Trieu the speech that Will Reeves wrote for her to read in front of the Seventh Kavalry and the Cyclops leadership. Bian later found Angela on the ground following Doctor Manhattan's death and helped her up while advising her to inform her fellow police officers to get away while they still can. Bian survives Veidt's second squid attack by ducking into one of the phone booths. She is last seen being comforted by Red Scare and Pirate Jenny over what had transpired.

=== Seventh Kavalry ===
The Seventh Kavalry is a white supremacist group with connections to the Cyclops organization. Each of its members wear Rorschach masks.

On Christmas Eve of 2015, the Seventh Kavalry committed the "White Night" event orchestrated by Senator Joe Keene where they attacked the houses of 40 known police officers and their families. The ones who were asleep at the time took the brunt of the attack. Angela Abar and Judd Crawford were the only confirmed survivors of this attack.

It was later revealed during the "White Night" event that the Seventh Kavalry learned that Doctor Manhattan was Cal Abar when he used his powers on some of the attackers where one of them was teleported to the Grand Canyon. Their plan is to capture and destroy Doctor Manhattan so that they can harness his powers. Some members of the Seventh Kavalry were able to do that at the cost of some of its members who were beheaded by Doctor Manhattan. The laser that aided them transported him to a synthetic lithium cage that was created from melting down a lot of watch batteries. With Laurie as their prisoner and Looking Glass hiding amongst its ranks, the Seventh Kavalry sent out invites to the Cyclops leadership to meet with them at an abandoned building where all was revealed to them by Joe Keene. Despite the warning from Angela that Lady Trieu is coming for them, Joe began his plot by using a machine to gain Doctor Manhattan's abilities. Upon its activation, Lady Trieu teleported everyone to her location where her men used their special shields to disarm the Seventh Kavalry of their weapons. Lady Trieu opened the machine to find that Joe was dissolved by the machine because it didn't have the component to filter the atomic energy. As Lady Trieu reads from a speech written out by Will Reeves of what Cyclops and the Seventh Kavalry did to all non-whites, Jane Crawford anticipated that Lady Trieu was going to kill them. Lady Trieu does that by vaporizing the Seventh Kavalry and the Cyclops leadership.

==== Joe Keene ====
John Joseph "Joe" Keene Jr. (portrayed by James Wolk) is a Republican Senator and leader of the Seventh Kavalry who aims to become president. His father is responsible for a 1977 law banning masked vigilantism.

Looking Glass was the first to learn of Joe Keene's involvement with the Seventh Kavalry while having one of its members fake an attempt on his life. In addition, he also showed Looking Glass the footage that Ozymandias pre-taped for Robert Redford in the event that he became President of the United States.

After Laurie Blake was dropped down a trap door by Jane Crawford and taken captive, Joe revealed to her their plans to capture and destroy Doctor Manhattan so that they can harness his powers.

Later, the Kavalry is successful in capturing Manhattan as the Cyclops leadership gathers. While stripping into a pair of Doctor Manhattan-like briefs, Keene ended up explaining how they found Doctor Manhattan. Keene then gets into the machine as it activates. However, the Kavalry was unsuccessful in harnessing his powers as Keene's body being dissolved into blue slime in the process because he didn't have a component in the machine to filter the atomic energies according to Lady Trieu as the energies of Doctor Manhattan can do that to anyone when she opened the machine to let him out. The rest of the Kavalry and the Cyclops leadership are subsequently killed by Lady Trieu. Doctor Manhattan later lit the remains of Keene with his powers in order to transport Laurie Juspeczyk, Adrien Veidt, and Looking Glass to Veidt's Antarctica lair.

==== Jane Crawford ====
Jane Crawford (portrayed by Frances Fisher) is Judd's wife who is secretly a high-ranking member of the Seventh Kavalry.

Due to Angela's ramblings when recuperating from Will's Nostalgia, Laurie visits Jane about Judd's connection with the Seventh Kavalry. This causes Jane to open the trap door beneath Laurie and inform Joe Keene of her capture. Jane is also present for the capture of Doctor Manhattan and is outed as a high-ranking member of Cyclops. After figuring out what Lady Trieu will do to them, Jane is among the Cyclops members vaporized by Lady Trieu.

==== Renee ====
Renee (portrayed by Paula Malcomson) is a radiologist who is a member of the Seventh Kavalry. She is the one responsible for luring Looking Glass to the Seventh Kavalry's hideout.

=== Minor television series characters ===
The following are the minor characters that appear in the television series:

- Andy (portrayed by Jim Beaver) is the paternal grandfather of the Doyle children who visits them and the Abars.
- Mr. Shadow (portrayed by Lee Tergesen) is a vigilante who was targeted by the Anti-Vigilante Task Force. They drew him out by pretending to rob National Bank Inc. where Laurie Blake subdued him with her bullets.
- Max Faragut (portrayed by David Andrews) is the deputy director of the FBI that Laurie and Petey answer to.

== See also ==
- List of DC Comics characters
- List of Doomsday Clock characters

== General sources ==
- Gibbons, Dave. Watching the Watchmen: The Definitive Companion to the Graphic Novel. Titan Books, 2008. ISBN 978-1-84856-041-3.
- Klock, Geoff. How to Read Superhero Comics and Why. Continuum, 2002. ISBN 0-8264-1419-2.
- Reynolds, Richard. Super Heroes: A Modern Mythology. B. T. Batsford Ltd, 1992. ISBN 0-7134-6560-3.
- Wright, Bradford W. Comic Book Nation: The Transformation of Youth Culture in America. Johns Hopkins, 2001. ISBN 0-8018-7450-5.
