= Big Figure =

Big Figure may refer to:

- Big Figure, see List of Watchmen characters#Minor characters
- The Big Figure (John Martin, born 08 November 1946), drummer with Dr. Feelgood (band)
