= Comedian (character) =

The Comedian
- Cover art of Watchmen (French Edition) #1 (1987). Art by Dave Gibbons.

Publication information
- Publisher: DC Comics
- First appearance: Watchmen #1 (September 1986)
- Created by: Alan Moore; Dave Gibbons

In-story information
- Alter ego: Edward Morgan “Eddie” Blake
- Team affiliations: Federal government of the United States; Crimebusters; Minutemen
- Abilities: Peak human physical condition; Expert hand-to-hand combat and marksman; Skilled in espionage

The Comedian (Edward Morgan "Eddie" Blake) is a fictional character who debuted in the graphic novel limited series Watchmen, published by DC Comics. The Comedian was created by writer Alan Moore with artist Dave Gibbons. As with most of the main characters in the series, he was an analogue for a Charlton Comics character; in this case, the Peacemaker. Moore imagined the Comedian as a mix between the Peacemaker with "a little bit of Nick Fury" and "probably a bit of the standard Captain America patriotic hero-type".

== Fictional character biography ==
=== Events of Watchmen ===
The story of Watchmen starts with the aftermath of Edward Blake's murder in 1985. Fellow crimefighter Rorschach, independently investigating the murder, discovers that Blake was in fact the Comedian. The main plot of Watchmen initially involves Rorschach's suspicion of a plot to kill costumed heroes ("masks"); his continuing investigation into Blake's murder leads to a much larger, more horrifying secret. The Comedian's appearances in Watchmen consist of flashbacks of the other characters. He is also mentioned in Under the Hood, the fictional autobiography of Hollis Mason (Nite Owl I) that appears in Watchmen issues 1–3.

The Comedian was a cigar-chomping, gun-toting vigilante-turned-paramilitary agent. When he first became a costumed adventurer in 1939, he dressed in a clown-like costume with a simple domino mask. A brutal vigilante, Blake managed to expunge most organized crime from the New York harbor. He became the youngest member of The Minutemen, a prominent group of heroes.

After one particular photography shoot of The Minutemen, Blake attempted to rape his comrade Silk Spectre; she escaped only when another Minuteman, Hooded Justice, interrupted the assault and beat Blake, breaking his nose. The Comedian was then expelled from the group—but Silk Spectre's entertainment agent persuaded her not to press charges against him for fear of what it would do to the group's image. During a secret and consensual encounter years later, Blake impregnated Silk Spectre with her daughter and successor, Laurie.

In the 1940s, Blake updated his Comedian uniform, after being stabbed by a small-time hood. He adopted a leather outfit that served as light body armor, adorned with short star-and-stripe-themed sleeves and a small happy face button. He retained the small domino mask and began carrying a pistol. He fought in World War II, becoming a war hero in the Pacific theater. It is also implied, but not directly stated, that he murdered Hooded Justice in revenge for the beating he suffered.

By the late 1960s, Blake had begun working as a covert government operative. Hollis Mason, the original Nite Owl, had published his autobiography Under the Hood by this point and in it disclosed the Comedian's sexual assault on Sally Jupiter/Silk Spectre. In 1966, he was invited to join the Crimebusters by Captain Metropolis, but he quickly ruined the older hero's hopes of a new team by mocking him, and pointing out that old fashioned crime fighting methods would not save the world from nuclear war.

Alongside Doctor Manhattan, the Comedian played a major role in the United States' war with Vietnam. Shortly after Manhattan's godlike powers forced the North Vietnamese to surrender, Blake was confronted by his lover, a pregnant Vietnamese woman. He told her bluntly that he planned to leave the country immediately without her, and in a rage she slashed his face with a broken bottle. Blake shot and killed her, but the attack left his face permanently disfigured with a scar running from his right eye to the corner of his mouth. After this incident, he began wearing a leather gimp-style mask when dressed as the Comedian.

The costumed adventurers faced massive backlash and rioting in 1977; in response, Congress passed the Keene Act, requiring all heroes to register with the government if they wished to remain active. The majority of them "retired" in anonymity; while others, such as Rorschach, continued their activities in open defiance of the law. Doctor Manhattan and the Comedian were two of the few who registered and were employed by the government. Blake enjoyed his new role in the government and the protection it offered, even going so far as to suggest to members of President Nixon's staff that he had killed Bob Woodward and Carl Bernstein before they could reveal the details of the Watergate scandal, as well as being behind the assassination of John F. Kennedy (on Nixon's orders). The Iran hostage crisis in 1980 was resolved when Blake freed the captives after an assault.

It was during his return from a government mission in 1984 that Blake discovered the island where Adrian Veidt (Ozymandias) was conducting his experiments that would ultimately destroy New York City. Shocked and appalled by what he finds, with Veidt's plans going too far even for him, Blake realizes that no one will believe him if he reveals Veidt's intentions, as by now he'd established a reputation as a great industrialist and humanitarian. He drunkenly breaks into Edgar Jacobi's (the former super villain Moloch) house and cryptically describes the plan, knowing Jacobi will not understand but not realizing Veidt has the bedroom bugged. Veidt, to ensure that Blake does not compromise his operation, confronts Blake in his high-rise apartment and throws Blake out of the window, killing him.

=== Before Watchmen ===
Textless variant cover of Before Watchmen: Comedian #1 (June 2012). Art by Jim Lee.

In Before Watchmen: The Minutemen #1, additional details are revealed about the Comedian while material from the main story is somewhat retconned. It is revealed that the Comedian got his start as a costumed adventurer at the young age of sixteen and had a prior criminal record for assault. Unlike the rest of the costumed heroes of the Minutemen, he is shown to be driven by greed and an inherent love for violence. In particular, he assaults a bartender after breaking up a bar fight and steals liquor and money from the cash register. The issue also implies Blake may have been a victim of severe child abuse as he claims that a "caseworker" told him what he suffered was the cause of his violent outbursts, though Blake's status as an unreliable narrator makes the claim uncertain.

Before Watchmen: Comedian #1 rewrites the character's back-story further. It is revealed that Blake was friends with Robert F. Kennedy and John F. Kennedy as well as Jackie Kennedy. This contradicts the main Watchmen series, which cast Edward Blake as a friend and employee of Richard Nixon. The mini-series reveals that Blake was responsible for the murder of Marilyn Monroe (ordered by Jackie Kennedy, behind her husband's back) as well as revealing that, despite strong innuendo from both Blake and Ozymandias, that he did not kill John Kennedy and was attempting to confront Moloch when he found the villain watching the live coverage of the assassination, including Kennedy's death, which caused the two foes to commiserate in their grief. It is implied that a former FBI agent with a resemblance to Blake may have been behind it.

=== Doomsday Clock ===
In the sequel comic book Doomsday Clock, the Comedian seemingly turns up alive when he confronts Ozymandias at the time when he was in the DC Universe meeting with Lex Luthor. It is revealed that Doctor Manhattan has captured the Comedian from moments before his death. Comedian catches up to Joker, Mime, and Marionette when they attend an underground villain meeting held by Riddler to discuss the Superman Theory. He evades Giganta's attacks, shoots Riddler in the leg, and uses a grenade to defeat the other villains present. When Mime and Marionette are in bed together the next morning, the Comedian catches up to them, planning to use them to find Ozymandias. Before the Comedian can do anything, Joker comes to Mime and Marionette's rescue and uses a joy buzzer on Comedian, who escapes. Luthor shoots the Comedian with a device which returns him to the moment he was taken from, leaving him to die.

== Character inspiration and origin of name ==
Alan Moore has stated that the Comedian, besides his comic book inspirations, was based on G. Gordon Liddy, a former FBI agent and a figure in the Watergate scandal as the chief operative of the White House Plumbers during the Nixon administration. Liddy was convicted of conspiracy, burglary, and illegal wiretapping for his role in the scandal. Moore imagined the Comedian as Liddy with "comic book muscles".

In the comic, Rorschach explains that Blake's moniker of "The Comedian" stems from his cynical and selfish world perspective that "in an insane world", one can only laugh, as if everything is "a joke". Moore took the idea of the name from Graham Greene's novel The Comedians.

== Powers and abilities ==
The Comedian was a skilled hand-to-hand combatant in excellent physical condition, even at the time of his death at the age of 67. Blake was proficient with his M1911 .45 caliber pistol, MAC-10 submachine gun and pump-action shotgun and was shown using a variety of conventional weaponry in his adventures (flamethrowers, grenade launchers, etc.). His government-sanctioned activities suggest that he received training in covert operations and unconventional warfare.

== Smiley face badge ==
Throughout the work, the Comedian is typically seen wearing or in close proximity to the "smiley face" button, which is closely associated with him, and has become the iconic symbol of the Watchmen series as a whole. At the beginning of the series, the button is stained with a single drop of blood which, if the button is viewed as a clock face, is at the position of the minute hand of the Doomsday Clock at the time of the series, five minutes to midnight.

== In other media ==
=== Television ===
- The Comedian appears in Watchmen: Motion Comic, voiced by Tom Stechschulte.
- The Comedian appears in the Watchmen (2019) episode "This Extraordinary Being", portrayed by an uncredited actor.

=== Film ===
- The Comedian appears in Watchmen (2009), portrayed by Jeffrey Dean Morgan.
- The Comedian appears in Watchmen (2024), voiced by Rick D. Wasserman.

=== Video games ===
The Comedian appears in Watchmen: The End Is Nigh, voiced by Mark Silverman.
