= Watchmen (2024 film) =

Two-part animated superhero film

- Release poster for Chapter I, featuring (from left to right) The Comedian, Doctor Manhattan, Ozymandias, Rorschach, Silk Spectre and Nite Owl
- Directed by: Brandon Vietti
- Written by: J. Michael Straczynski
- Based on: Watchmen by Dave Gibbons (Note: The comic was also written and co-created by Alan Moore, but he chose to remain uncredited on the films for his work on the source material.)
- Produced by: Jim Krieg; Cindy Rago; Brandon Vietti
- Starring: Matthew Rhys; Katee Sackhoff; Titus Welliver
- Edited by: Cris Mertens
- Music by: Tim Kelly
- Production companies: Paramount Animation; Warner Bros. Animation; Warner Bros. Pictures Animation; DC Entertainment
- Distributed by: Warner Bros. Home Entertainment (USA/Canada); Paramount Home Entertainment (International)
- Release dates: August 13, 2024 (Chapter I); November 26, 2024 (Chapter II)
- Running time: 84 minutes (Chapter I); 89 minutes (Chapter II)
- Country: United States
- Language: English

Watchmen is a 2024 American adult animated two-part superhero film directed by Brandon Vietti and written by J. Michael Straczynski. It stars an ensemble cast including Matthew Rhys, Katee Sackhoff, Titus Welliver, Troy Baker, Adrienne Barbeau, and Michael Cerveris. Chapter I is the 57th film, and Chapter II is the 58th film of the DC Universe Animated Original Movies, and produced by Warner Bros. Animation, Paramount Pictures, and DC Entertainment, and distributed by Warner Bros. Home Entertainment in North America and Paramount Home Entertainment elsewhere.

The film is based on the DC Comics limited series of the same name co-created and illustrated by Dave Gibbons, with co-creator and author Alan Moore choosing to remain uncredited here for his work on the source material. Set in an alternate 1985, the film follows a group of outlawed and retired superheroes who investigate a conspiracy following the murder of one of their own. Gibbons served as a consulting producer on the film. Animation for the film was provided by Studio Mir.

The first part (titled Watchmen Chapter I) was released on August 13, 2024, while the second part (titled Watchmen Chapter II) was released on November 26, 2024.

== Plot ==
=== Chapter I ===
In 1985, in a reality in which superheroes have existed since World War II, Eddie Blake, an aging semi-retired government operative, is thrown to his death from the window of his apartment. A police investigation reveals that he was once the Comedian, a crass, gun-toting superhero who served in Vietnam. In this reality, aided by Dr. Jonathan "Jon" Osterman (the powerful superhero Doctor Manhattan), the United States have won the Vietnam War and Richard Nixon is still president. Blake's former colleague Rorschach, having taken up vigilantism, starts his own investigation into the Comedian's murder and concludes that someone is targeting former superheroes. He warns all of his surviving former allies, but they largely ignore or dismiss him.

Rorschach eventually targets Edward Jacobi, a retired supervillain known as "Moloch the Mystic", believing that he might be responsible; Jacobi pleads innocence and is spared the vigilante's wrath. As Rorschach continues to investigate, the viewer sees flashbacks from the other former heroes' pasts: how each of them became a superhero, what they experienced after costumed heroes were outlawed in 1977, and what their lives have become since.

Meanwhile, Laurie Juspeczyk (the second Silk Spectre after her mother Sally "Jupiter" Juspeczyk) and Dan Dreiberg (formerly known as the second Nite Owl) renew their once close friendship, after Laurie feels that her relationship with Manhattan lacks any real passion because the latter is distracted by his scientific research and increasingly disinterested in living a normal life.

At a press conference to answer public concerns that he is dangerous, Manhattan is ambushed and castigated by a reporter who claims that the hero gave some of his past acquaintances terminal cancer. When the reporters begin to surround and aggressively question him, the doctor suffers a nervous breakdown and exiles himself to Mars. His absence triggers new geopolitical tensions between the United States and its global rivals. Feeling abandoned, Laurie moves to Dan's apartment.

Rorschach starts to regularly visit Jacobi, one of the last people to have talked to the Comedian and one of the people with terminal cancer, to question him. In one of his visits to Jacobi's apartment, he finds the former villain gunned down, just as the police arrive. The vigilante initially manages to fight them off using his resourcefulness and combat skills but is ultimately overpowered and unmasked as Walter Kovacs.

During the end credits, the viewer hears radio recordings of old superheroes from the 1940s, including Hollis voicing his optimism in the next generation of superheroes, and Janey voicing her pessimism over John's neglect and the world's growing fear of catastrophe he could unleash, not just the Soviets.

=== Chapter II ===
In prison, Kovacs is treated by psychiatrist Malcolm Long, to whom he reveals his past and how it shaped him into Rorschach; his abusive childhood, the shattering of his formerly ironclad religious faith, learning of a young woman's murder, for which no one intervened or even seemed to care, and the murder of a little girl, who's corpse he discovered was cooked and fed to dogs. Kovacs is also threatened by other inmates, including Big Figure, a crime boss he and Nite Owl apprehended in the past. Meanwhile, Dreiberg begins believing Rorschach's theory and decides to don the mantle of Nite Owl again, with Juspeczyk joining him as Silk Spectre, eventually drawing public attention after risking their lives to save people trapped in a burning building.

After one last visit from Hollis Mason (the original Nite Owl) and evading the police, Dreiberg and Juspeczyk storm the prison to free Kovacs, just as Big Figure orchestrates a riot in an attempt to kill him. Kovacs escapes, reassumes his identity as Rorschach, and murders Big Figure before joining them. Juspeczyk is then abducted by Doctor Manhattan and teleported to his palace on Mars. Manhattan reveals that he knows of Juspeczyk's relationship with Dreiberg and asks her why he thinks her world is worth saving. Juspeczyk, furious by his unfazed reaction to Earth's potential devastation, elaborates on the reasons why Dan is a more receptive lover. She gets Manhattan to admit that without her to validate his fading humanity, he no longer cares about the fate of the world and instead wishes to create his own paradise on Mars.

Juspeczyk later recollects a childhood memory of her stepfather always upset at her, because she was the daughter of her mother's ex-boyfriend, who she always believed to be Hooded Justice. However, she soon realizes that Eddie Blake (The Comedian) was actually her biological father. Devastated and shattered by this revelation, she breaks down and destroys Manhattan's palace. However, the doctor experiences a change of heart after he witnesses her grief. He tells Juspeczyk that he will help her, having come to see the unlikely circumstances of her birth given her parents' relationship as miraculous, along with any life on Earth in the face of the volatile nature of the universe.

Rorschach and the Nite Owl continue to research more about Pyramid Holdings, and head to Veidt Enterprises to warn Adrian Veidt, where they discover that he owns and controls Pyramid Holdings. Realizing Adrian is behind everything - including the death of the Comedian - Rorschach and the Nite Owl track Veidt to Karnak, his private base in the Antarctic. Manhattan teleports himself and Juspeczyk to New York City, only to discover than an otherworldly species has attacked the city, killing millions in the process. After destroying the creature, Manhattan senses the presence of tachyon particles around it and realizes that Veidt was the man behind everything. At the Karnak, Rorschach and Nite Owl reunite with Manhattan and Juspeczyk to confront Veidt, now dressed as his former superhero persona, Ozymandias.

Veidt explains that Veidt Enterprises used genetic engineering to create the "aliens" and stage a fake invasion, thereby uniting the world against them and thus laying foundations for a new age of global peace and cooperation. He declares that by doing this, he has created a world that no longer needs superheroes, and one where he will be uniquely positioned to shape human society in his own image.

Manhattan confronts Veidt about his ideals, only for the latter to show him a news broadcast of world leaders putting aside their differences and declaring a mutual plan to fight the "aliens". However, Veidt's former colleagues swear that they will see him face justice for all the harm he has done. Veidt argues that by arresting and prosecuting him, they risk exposing his plans and thus undoing all the work for a "better world", stating that millions of people would have died for nothing. On hearing this, the heroes reluctantly come to a compromise and agree to keep Veidt's machinations a secret except for Rorschach, who is disgusted by their agreement and promises to expose Veidt. Unable to see any other way and disagreeing to be complicit in Veidt's actions, Manhattan kills Rorschach at his request, gravely devastating Nite Owl. Manhattan then departs to explore the universe.

Dreiberg and Laurie, now posing as a married couple using the surname "Hollis", later visit a dying Sally Juspeczyk. There, Laurie tells her she knows who her true father was and forgives her.

During the end credits, Benny Anger expresses resentment over America's newfound peace with Russia limiting his opportunities for outrage content derisively telling his assistant Seymour to find something from the "crank files" to run to give them content to publish. As he searches the files, he reaches for what ends up being Rorschach's journal, which he left in a mailbox before heading off to face Veidt, his entries detailing the conspiracy and Veidt's involvement in it.

== Voice cast ==
Voice actor	Character
Appearing in both parts
Matthew Rhys	Dan Dreiberg / Nite Owl II / Sam Hollis
Katee Sackhoff	Laurie Juspeczyk / Silk Spectre II / Sandra Hollis
Titus Welliver	Walter Kovacs / Rorschach
Troy Baker	Adrian Veidt / Ozymandias
Rick D. Wasserman	Edward Blake / Comedian
Adrienne Barbeau	Sally Jupiter / Silk Spectre I
Michael Cerveris	Jonathan Osterman / Dr. Manhattan
Geoff Pierson	Hollis Mason / Nite Owl I
Kari Wahlgren	Female Knot Top
Yuri Lowenthal	Knot Top #2
Phil LaMarr	Comic Book Narrator, Bernie
Jason Spisak	Doug Roth
John Marshall Jones	General #1
Max Koch	Bernard, President Nixon
Chapter I
Matthew Rhys	Photographer #3
Troy Baker	Minister, Benny Anger
Rick D. Wasserman	Male Citizen #1, Photographer #2
Adrienne Barbeau	TV Broadcaster
Michael Cerveris	Father
Corey Burton	Captain Metropolis, Forbes, American Newscaster
Yuri Lowenthal	Wally Weaver, Criminal #1
Jeffrey Combs	Edgar Jacobi / Moloch the Mystic, British Newscaster, Photographer #1
Phil LaMarr	Security Guard
John Marshall Jones	Hooded Justice, Criminal #2
Kari Wahlgren	Janey Slater, Female Citizen #1
Jason Spisak	President John F. Kennedy, Restaurant Cook
Max Koch	Detective Joe Bourquin
Kelly Hu	Yvonne, Vietnamese Woman
Grey Griffin	Spanish Newscaster, Female Citizen #2
Dwight Schultz	Detective Steve Fine, Happy Harry
Chapter II
Matthew Rhys	Max Shea, Michael Stephens, Prisoner #1
Troy Baker	Derf, Laurence Schexnayder, Gerald Grice, News Announcer
Adrienne Barbeau	Police Dispatcher
Michael Cerveris	Police Guard #2
Geoff Pierson	Prison Guard #1
John Marshall Jones	Otis, Malcolm Long,
Zehra Fazal	Hira Manish, Newscaster
Yuri Lowenthal	Seymour David, Bully #1
Phil LaMarr	Male Citizen #1
Kari Wahlgren	Sylvia Kovacs
Phil Fondacaro	Tom Ryan / Big Figure
Max Koch	Lawrence Andrews
Grey Griffin	Female Citizen #1, Advisor #1
Long Nguyen	Attendant #1
Jason Spisak	Hector Godfrey, Bully #2

== Production ==
It was reported in April 2017 that Warner Bros. would develop an R-rated animated film based on the comic book series. It was officially confirmed in 2023 that an animated film adaptation was in development and would be released in 2024. A teaser trailer was released on June 13, 2024, with it being revealed to be a two-film adaptation. Director Brandon Vietti praised the animation work done by Studio Mir, stating in an interview that "It was a kind of material and filmmaking that I don't think the studio had approached before, but we had a lot of great discussions about it and they really rose to the challenge."

== Release and reception ==
Watchmen Chapter I received a digital release on August 13, 2024. The film was released on Blu-ray and 4K Ultra HD on August 27, 2024.

On Rotten Tomatoes, the film has an approval rating of 92% based on 12 reviews, with an average rating of 7.4/10. On Metacritic, which assigns a weighted average rating reviews from mainstream critics, the film has a score of 71 out of 100, based on 5 critics, indicating "generally favorable" reviews. William Bibbiani of TheWrap felt that the film respectfully adapted the story, but struggled to properly convey its complexity and described the visual aesthetic as "serviceable but not entirely effective". Brad Cook of Flickering Myth agreed, calling the film a "very faithful adaptation" with a visual style that "hews closely to artist Dave Gibbons' well-regarded depictions of the characters and the alternate 1985 timeline they inhabit".
