= Adrian Veidt =

Comic book character

Ozymandias
- Adrian "Ozymandias" Veidt with his pet lynx Bubastis. Art by Dave Gibbons.

Publication information
- Publisher: DC Comics
- First appearance: Watchmen #1 (September 1986)
- Created by: Alan Moore; Dave Gibbons

In-story information
- Alter ego: Adrian Alexander Veidt
- Team affiliations: Crimebusters; Watchmen (cinematic version)
- Notable aliases: The World's Smartest Man
- Abilities: Peak human strength, speed, stamina and resilience; Genius-level intellect; Unrivaled understanding of human psychology; Master martial artist and hand-to-hand combatant; Body reading ability; Ultra-fast reflexes; Indomitable will; Skilled in tactical analysis and business management; Proficient engineer and historiographer

Adrian Alexander Veidt, also known as Ozymandias (/ˌɒzɪˈmændiəs/ OZ-im-AN-dee-əs), is a fictional character and the main antagonist in the graphic novel limited series Watchmen, published by DC Comics. Created by Alan Moore and Dave Gibbons, named "Ozymandias" in the manner of Ramesses II, his name recalls the famous poem by Percy Bysshe Shelley, which takes as its theme the fleeting nature of empire and is excerpted as the epigraph of one of the chapters of Watchmen.

Ozymandias is ranked number 25 on Wizard's Top 200 Comic Book Characters list and number 21 on IGN's Top 100 Villains list.

Veidt made his live-action debut in the 2009 film Watchmen, played by Matthew Goode. An older Adrian Veidt appeared in the 2019 limited television series Watchmen, played by Jeremy Irons.

== Fictional biography ==
=== Early life ===
Adrian Veidt was born in 1939, and is the son of wealthy German-American immigrant parents. As a child, he received high grades in school, and it was noted that he was very intelligent. He then hid this information from his elders and peers by deliberately achieving average marks. After his parents' deaths, he inherited their substantial fortune at age seventeen, but chose to give it all to charity as he wanted to make something of himself on his own. Veidt embarked on a vision quest, following the route of his childhood idol Alexander the Great. During an excursion into the Middle East, Veidt consumed a ball of hashish and saw visions of the past. As he finished his travels in Egypt, he realized that Alexander was a pale imitation of Ramesses II, who became Veidt's new hero. On returning to the US, he began training himself to achieve peak physical condition, becoming a world-class gymnast in the process.

=== Superhero career ===
At age 19, Veidt named himself Ozymandias (the Greek name for Ramesses II) and became a costumed vigilante, earning a reputation as "the smartest man on the planet” and using his physical skills to non-violently incapacitate opponents. He debuted in early 1958 by exposing a drug ring in New York City. In 1966, he was invited by former Minuteman and adventurer Captain Metropolis to become a member of the Crimebusters, but the group never came to fruition due to the Comedian's breaking up of the meeting. It was at this moment that Veidt began to believe superheroics were not enough to save the world, and began plotting a method that could.

=== After being a superhero ===
Signature

Due to the increasingly negative perceptions of vigilantes by the media, Veidt predicted that the public would turn away from them. Two years before costumed heroes were banned by the Keene Act, Adrian Veidt revealed his secret identity, retired from superheroism and marketed his image. He became very wealthy and was known as a great humanitarian, and used this to bankroll his secret scheme of creating a catastrophic event to deceive the world into uniting against a common enemy and thus avert nuclear war. Upon completion of his project, Veidt planned to murder all of his (unwitting) accomplices and arrange the psychological deterioration and self-exile of the presumably invincible Doctor Manhattan.

Fellow vigilante Edward Blake, a.k.a. the Comedian, stumbled upon Veidt's plans. This led Veidt to personally murder the Comedian, setting off the chain of events told in the story of Watchmen.

=== Events of Watchmen ===
Veidt is first seen when Rorschach visits him to get his opinion on Blake's murder and to warn about a possible serial killer targeting superheroes. Rorschach is unconvinced of Veidt's theory that Blake was assassinated by a bitter arch-rival. Veidt is one of the few people attending Blake's funeral, at which he reminisces about the failed Crimebusters meeting. Later, Veidt narrowly escapes an assassination attempt that leaves his assistant dead. The would-be assassin dies from an unseen cyanide capsule before Veidt can interrogate him.

Rorschach and Nite Owl deduce that Veidt is behind the whole plot after they link one of Veidt's shell companies to a plot to discredit Manhattan. The duo realize that Veidt exposed Manhattan's former lover, colleagues, and an enemy to radiation and deliberately monitored them for cancer, so Manhattan would flee Earth out of either guilt or public enmity. When Rorschach and Nite Owl arrive at Veidt's Antarctic retreat, he easily overpowers both of them and explains his plan to save humanity from itself: teleport a biologically-engineered, telepathic creature to New York which would kill millions and convince the world that they were under extraterrestrial attack. The US and the Soviet Union, on the brink of nuclear confrontation, would then join forces against the supposed alien invaders. He also admits to framing Manhattan, killing the Comedian, framing Rorschach for the murder of Moloch, and staging the attempt on taking his own life, killing his attacker. When Rorschach and Nite Owl ask him when he planned to execute his scheme, Veidt reveals that he had already done so 35 minutes earlier, even before their arrival at his retreat.

When Doctor Manhattan and Silk Spectre confront Veidt, he attempts to disintegrate Manhattan in the intrinsic field subtractor while sacrificing his genetically-altered pet lynx Bubastis, but Doctor Manhattan is able to reform himself. Silk Spectre attempts to shoot him, but he catches the bullet and knocks her out. Realizing that exposing Veidt's plan will undo the nascent world peace, most of the heroes agree to remain silent on the plot. Rorschach, a moral absolutist, prepares to return to the US and reveal Veidt's plan to the world, but ultimately lets Manhattan kill him. Before Manhattan leaves to create life in another galaxy, Veidt asks him if he "did the right thing in the end." Manhattan replies that "nothing ever ends", leaving Veidt in doubt about how long the peace will last. Unknown to Veidt and the other characters, Rorschach has previously mailed a journal detailing his findings about Veidt's plan to a New York newspaper. The editors' decision on whether or not to publish the journal is not revealed.

=== Before Watchmen ===
A six-part series on Ozymandias titled Before Watchmen: Ozymandias had its first issue released in July 2012. It is written by Len Wein, with art by Jae Lee. This is part of a 37-issue Before Watchmen series.

=== Events of Doomsday Clock ===
Seven years after the events of Watchmen, Rorschach's journal is released to the public and Veidt becomes a fugitive. Having purportedly been diagnosed with terminal brain cancer, and knowing that his plan to save the world has failed, Veidt recruits a man bearing the Rorschach moniker and has him break Erika Manson (Marionette) and her husband Marcos Maez (Mime) out of prison. When Rorschach II returns with the two, Veidt reveals himself and his situation, explaining to the two criminals that they must follow Manhattan to another universe and convince him to save their world. In addition, he also cloned Bubastis from his salvaged DNA to help find Doctor Manhattan due to it having some of Doctor Manhattan's energy which is needed to find him.

Using the Owlship, Veidt and his group travel to the DC Universe just as nuclear war breaks out on their Earth. After conducting research on this new world he's found himself in, Veidt goes to Metropolis to ask Lex Luthor to join his quest. However, as he is pleading his case, Veidt is shocked to find himself being confronted by the Comedian, who has been transported to the DC Universe by Manhattan. The Comedian turns out to be evenly matched with Veidt, forcing him to retreat through Luthor's office window.

Veidt falls twenty stories and is hospitalized with minor injuries, but soon manages to escape. Upon returning to the Owlship, Veidt is confronted by Batman, who has read the contents of the original Rorschach's journal. As the two elude the police, Batman asserts that Veidt murdered millions as part of a delusional hero syndrome, and accuses him of concocting a conspiracy theory that has negatively affected the public's trust in the superheroes of the DC Universe. Veidt in turn criticizes Batman for focusing all his attention on supervillains while ignoring the world's social problems. A struggle ensues, leading to Batman falling out of the Owlship and into a mob of anti-hero protestors below.

Rorschach II, Saturn Girl and Johnny Thunder meet up with Veidt at the Owlship. With his pet lynx - a clone of Bubastis - and the Lantern Battery, Veidt travels to Manhattan's location at the Joker's lair, where Batman is fighting Marionette and Mime. Leaving Johnny and Saturn Girl on the Owlship, Veidt and Rorschach confront the others inside. Veidt uses Bubastis to summon Manhattan, who refuses to return to their world since he is in the middle of experimenting with this one. Manhattan reveals, among other things, that Veidt lied to Rorschach about having cancer in order to get his help. Rorschach punches Veidt and flees, while Veidt returns to the Owlship, attacks Saturn Girl and Johnny, and declares he can save everyone. Veidt then uses Bubastis' energy to cause an explosion in Moscow, framing Superman and Firestorm. As planned by Veidt, most of Earth's superheroes go to Mars to confront Manhattan, who they think is responsible. After defeating all the superheroes on Mars, Manhattan returns to Earth and confronts Superman. Manhattan is eventually convinced by Superman to use his powers for the greater good and to return to his Universe to save his Earth. Veidt then reveals that his plan was to engineer the confrontation between Manhattan and Superman as he had guessed that only the latter could change Manhattan's mind. Veidt is shot by the Comedian, but Rorschach stops the bleeding so Veidt can face prosecution. Rorschach and Veidt are then teleported by Doctor Manhattan back to the Watchmen universe, where Veidt is imprisoned for his crimes.

== Skills and abilities ==
Adrian Veidt has been deemed "the smartest man in the world" by many, mainly the media, though this title is regarded as well-deserved. From his earliest memories Veidt has been aware of his superior insight; also, his brain possesses a photographic memory. As Ozymandias, Veidt has deftly built empires legitimate and criminal each; the extent of them combined is enough for him to become a global influence through his exploitation of advanced technology and genetics.

Yearning for a practical measure of his abilities, Veidt’s ambition necessarily matches his estimation of his intelligence, as evidenced by his successful execution of his plan to help Earth towards utopia by ending international hostilities. He is shown to be a ruthless master strategist, maintaining total secrecy in swiftly eliminating anybody who dares to get in the way of his plans, or who is aware of his plans, or who unknowingly participates—even, ultimately, his most trusted conspirators.

Additionally, Veidt is depicted as having developed himself to the pinnacle of human physical ability. A world-class athlete, he is extremely physically fit and performs public exhibitions of his acrobatic feats in order to aid charity events. He is exceptionally active despite his age (mid-forties at the time of the events of Watchmen). Included as a back-up feature to issue #11, a Veidt interview conducted by Doug Roth notes Veidt as resembling a man of 30 rather than one of middle age.

Unknown to others, he has conditioned himself even to catch a bullet with his hand, though he himself was surprised when he managed to do so successfully. He is an almost superhuman unarmed combatant who easily defeats such unyielding fighters as Rorschach and Nite Owl, both at once. His only known melee defeat came early in his career at the hands of the Comedian, whom he later bested and killed, seemingly with that loss in mind.

== Feature film and script versions ==
In a 1989 Sam Hamm film draft, Veidt's goal is to go back in time to kill Jonathan Osterman before he becomes Dr. Manhattan, because he reasons that Manhattan's existence has led America to nuclear war with the Russians. Veidt is unable to kill Osterman in the past, but Osterman decides to alter the past so that Dr. Manhattan is never "born." By sacrificing his present self, Dr. Manhattan allows the human Osterman to have a normal life, but he kills Veidt before he could kill him in the past. In the 2003 David Hayter film draft script, Veidt plans to fire a solar radiation beam into New York; Veidt's plan succeeds, but Veidt also intends to kill Nite Owl and Silk Spectre afterwards. Nite Owl kills Veidt in self-defense.

== In other media ==
=== Film ===
- Ozymandias appears in Watchmen (2009), portrayed by Matthew Goode.
- Ozymandias appears in Watchmen (2024), voiced by Troy Baker.

=== Television ===
- Ozymandias appears in Watchmen: Motion Comic, voiced by Tom Stechschulte.
- Ozymandias appears in Watchmen (2019), portrayed by Jeremy Irons.

== In popular culture ==
In The Simpsons episode "Husbands and Knives", infant versions of Ozymandias along with Rorschach, Doctor Manhattan, and Nite Owl II are shown riding a surfboard on the cover of a DVD of the fictional film Watchmen Babies in V for Vacation (a parody of Alan Moore's graphic novels Watchmen and V for Vendetta).
