= Silk Spectre =

Mother and daughter superheroines

- Laurie Juspeczyk as Silk Spectre. Art by Dave Gibbons.

Publication information
- Publisher: DC Comics
- First appearance: Watchmen #1 (September 1986)
- Created by: Alan Moore; Dave Gibbons

In-story information
- Alter ego: Sally Juspeczyk (I); Laurel Jane "Laurie" Juspeczyk (II)
- Team affiliations: Minutemen (I); The Crimebusters (II)
- Notable aliases: (Sally); Sally Jupiter (Laurie); Sandra Hollis; Laurie Jupiter; Laurie Blake; The Comedienne

Silk Spectre is the name of two superheroines in the graphic novel limited series Watchmen, published by DC Comics. Created by Alan Moore and Dave Gibbons, the original Silk Spectre, Sally "Jupiter" Juspeczyk, was a member of the crimefighting team the Minutemen, while the second, Sally's daughter Laurel "Laurie" Jane Juspeczyk, became a member of the vigilante team Crimebusters, also known as the titular Watchmen.

In the early stages of the series' development, the characters were Charlton Comics superheroes; the female superhero was supposed to be Nightshade. However, Moore did not find Nightshade particularly interesting and was not even very familiar with the character. After the idea of using Charlton characters was abandoned, he decided to model Silk Spectre on superheroines like Phantom Lady and Black Canary (also an alias shared by mother and daughter).

The Sally and Laurie Juspeczyk versions of Silk Spectre made their live-action debuts in the 2009 film Watchmen, in which they were played by Carla Gugino and Malin Åkerman, respectively. An older version of Laurie Juspeczyk, now known as Laurie Blake, appeared in the 2019 limited television Watchmen, played by Jean Smart.

== Fictional character history ==
=== Sally Jupiter ===
The first Silk Spectre is a frizzy-haired, redheaded former waitress and burlesque dancer Sally Jupiter (her real last name is Juspeczyk, which she changes to hide her Polish ancestry). She assumes the identity of Silk Spectre sometime around 1938 at age 18, in order to advance her modeling career. She becomes a sex symbol by whom criminals do not mind being caught (or so goes her press). She is an action heroine version of a pin-up girl and, even in her old age, she is proud of her sex symbol status, apparently enjoying male attention, as indicated by her reaction to lurid fan letters and her enjoyment of a Tijuana bible based on her (much to her daughter's disapproval).

She is soon invited by Captain Metropolis to join The Minutemen, a group of costumed heroes. On October 2, 1940, after a meeting of the Minutemen, Edward "Eddie" Blake, alias The Comedian tries to rape her. He is thwarted in his attempt by fellow Minuteman Hooded Justice, who gives him a vicious beating. The event has a profound impact on Sally's life. Her agent, Laurence Schexnayder, persuades her not to press charges against the Comedian for fear of damaging the group's image. More celebrity than vigilante, Silk Spectre provides a cover for Hooded Justice's homosexuality by being his glamorous girlfriend. In an interview, she admits that she did not really like The Silhouette, a.k.a. Ursula Zandt, who often pestered her about her Polish heritage, but later expresses regret that she was expelled from the group simply because she is a lesbian, especially since there are men on the team who are gay (though she does not identify them). In 1947, Sally retires from crime-fighting and marries her agent, Laurence Schexnayder, while keeping in touch with Hollis Mason (Nite Owl) and Nelson Gardner (Captain Metropolis). In 1949, she gives birth to daughter Lauriel Jane Juspeczyk, commonly known as Laurie. It is known to both parents that Laurie is not Laurence's child, but The Comedian's, from a sexual encounter years after the assault, and this causes conflict in the family, leading the couple to divorce in 1956. While not explicitly stated, it is implied that Sally's second sexual encounter with The Comedian is consensual, and that, despite his earlier attack on her, she does have feelings for him.

In the pages of Doomsday Clock, it is revealed that Ozymandias speaks at her funeral. While in an asylum, Reggie Long is taught some of Sally's moves by fellow inmate Mothman where they both hear of her death.

=== Laurie Juspeczyk ===
Laurie Juspeczyk as Silk Spectre on the cover of Before Watchmen: Silk Spectre #1 (June 2012). Art by Jim Lee.

Sally pushes her daughter into the "family business of crimefighting." Laurel Jane "Laurie" Juspeczyk does not hold much interest in becoming her mother's successor, but goes along with Sally's wishes anyway. Growing up, the brunette Laurie knows Laurence Schexnayder is not her real father, and she believes, incorrectly, that her real father is Hooded Justice. Laurie Juspeczyk is a liberal-thinking, modern woman. She is vocal in her feminist and humanitarian concerns, and is quite a conditioned fighter. At the start of the story, she is shown to have a strained relationship with her mother. Driven by the memories of her own experience, Sally tries to keep Laurie from knowing some of the harsher realities of the crime fighting life. For example, she did not allow her to read the Hollis Mason (Nite-Owl I) autobiography Under the Hood (which included mention of The Comedian's sexual assault on Sally, something Laurie knew nothing of). Sally acted like an agent for her daughter, picking out her costume, and chauffeuring her to "Crimebusters" meetings. After the first of these meetings, Laurie met The Comedian outside, who complimented her for being the spitting image of her mother, but their conversation was broken off quickly by an angry Sally Jupiter. Laurie noted that the Comedian looked sad as he watched them drive away, and felt sorry for him. When Laurie later learned of the sexual assault, she hated The Comedian, though it seems that as time passed, and in a complicated way, Sally was able to come to terms with it, even to the point that she was willing to defend The Comedian from Laurie's derogatory remarks after he was murdered (as Laurie was born after an affair with The Comedian). At the same Crimebuster's meeting, Laurie met Doctor Manhattan, and the two quickly became attracted to one another, to his long-time girlfriend Janey Slater's anger. Shortly afterwards, 16-year-old Laurie became involved with thirty-something Doctor Manhattan, something her mother did not approve of, likening Laurie's relationship with Manhattan to being the equivalent of sleeping with an H-bomb. Drawn to him from the moment she first saw him, Laurie worked with Doctor Manhattan in some of his various domestic assignments, including the suppression of riots during the police strike of 1977. Never exactly happy being a vigilante and not happy with the government taking advantage with her relationship with the superhuman Manhattan, Laurie was more than pleased to quit being a superhero when the Keene Act of 1977 forced all but government-sponsored superheroes to retire.

==== Events of Watchmen ====
After retiring, Laurie lived with Manhattan for almost 20 years. However, their relationship became strained, owing to Manhattan's growing disconnection with humanity. Laurie eventually left him and moved in with Dan Dreiberg, a.k.a. the second Nite Owl, and the two soon became romantically involved. Dreiberg and Laurie decided to don their old costumes and take Dreiberg's airship Archie out. During their flight, they found a building on fire and rescued the inhabitants. Soon after, Laurie was brought to Mars by Dr. Manhattan, where she attempted to convince him to save humanity from impending nuclear war. During their conversation, Laurie finally came to the realization that her real father was The Comedian. Moved by the sheer unlikelihood of two people as different as Sally Jupiter and the Comedian producing a child, and the child being Laurie, Dr. Manhattan realized the miracle and value of human life and agreed to save the planet. The pair returned to earth, only to find half of New York City destroyed by Ozymandias' creature. They then teleport to Ozymandias' lair in Antarctica, where Laurie attempts to shoot Ozymandias, only to be thwarted by Ozymandias' untried ability to catch bullets. After realizing that Ozymandias' plan had worked, and that, despite the loss of several million lives, nuclear war had been averted while also uniting the nations of the world, the heroes (with the exception of Rorschach) decide that Ozymandias' plan should be kept secret to serve the greater good.

Shortly after these events, Laurie and Dan Drieberg adopt new appearances and identities, now calling themselves Sam and Sandra Hollis, and sporting blond hair. They visit Sally Jupiter—now living in a retirement home—and Laurie tells her mother that she has realized the truth about her father. The issue is put to rest for Laurie, who accepts that the situation between her mother and the Comedian is too complicated, and she forgives her. "Sam and Sandra" leave soon afterward, indicating that they will continue to adventure, although Laurie expresses the wish for a better superhero identity: leather for better protection, a mask to hide her identity, and a firearm to better fight. This parallels her father's, the Comedian, change from a gaudy yellow clown suit to light leather armor with a mask to cover his scar and a variety of guns. After watching them leave, Sally picks up an old photograph of the Minutemen, which includes the Comedian, and kisses his half of the picture as tears roll down her face.

==== 2010s ====
The 2012 miniseries Before Watchmen: Silk Spectre revealed that Laurie got her start as a super-hero being trained by her mother to continue the family legacy, before running away from home at the age of 16 and relocating to San Francisco with her boyfriend.

In the 2018 miniseries Doomsday Clock, it is revealed that seven years after the events of Watchmen, "Sam and Sandra Hollis" have a daughter together. They also adopt Clark, the son of two costumed villains, Mime and Marionette. After jailing the pair following an aborted bank robbery, Dr. Manhattan noted that Marionette was pregnant. He sensed that the child had a bright future ahead of him. In order to preserve that future, he took the boy as an infant following his birth in a prison hospital. Dr. Manhattan named him Clark (after Superman), raised him nearly to his teen years, and after bequeathing Clark his powers and infusing his life force into the planet, brought Clark to the Hollises to raise.

== Powers and abilities ==
Both Silk Spectres have no real superpowers, and are instead expert gymnasts and are experts at hand-to-hand combat.

== In other media ==
=== Television ===
- Both Silk Spectre incarnations appear in Watchmen: Motion Comic, where both of them, along with every other character in the series, are voiced by Tom Stechschulte.
- Both Silk Spectre incarnations appear in Watchmen (2019). Jean Smart portrays the second Silk Spectre, Laurie Juspeczyk, and an uncredited actress portrays the original, Sally Jupiter. In supplementary materials, it is revealed that Laurie and Night Owl II ended their relationship in the 1990s, as he desired children while she wished to keep fighting crime, with Laurie assuming the identity of The Comedienne and her father's surname Blake. After foiling the Oklahoma City bombing, they were arrested by the FBI for violating the Keene Act, and through a plea bargain, Laurie retired from vigilante life. She later works as a member of the FBI anti-vigilante task force who confronts a plot to steal Dr. Manhattan's powers.

=== Film ===
- Both Silk Spectre incarnations appear in Watchmen (2009). Malin Åkerman portrays the second Silk Spectre, Laurie Juspeczyk, and Carla Gugino portrays the original Silk Spectre, Sally Jupiter. Haley Guiel portrays a young Laurie Jupiter in flashbacks.
- Both Silk Spectre incarnations appear in the animated film, Watchmen (2024). Katee Sackhoff voices the second Silk Spectre, Laurie Juspeczyk and Adrienne Barbeau voices the original Silk Spectre, Sally Jupiter.

=== Video games ===
Silk Spectre II appears in a cutscene in Watchmen: The End Is Nigh, voiced by Andrea Baker.
