= John Marshall Jones =

American actor (born 1962)

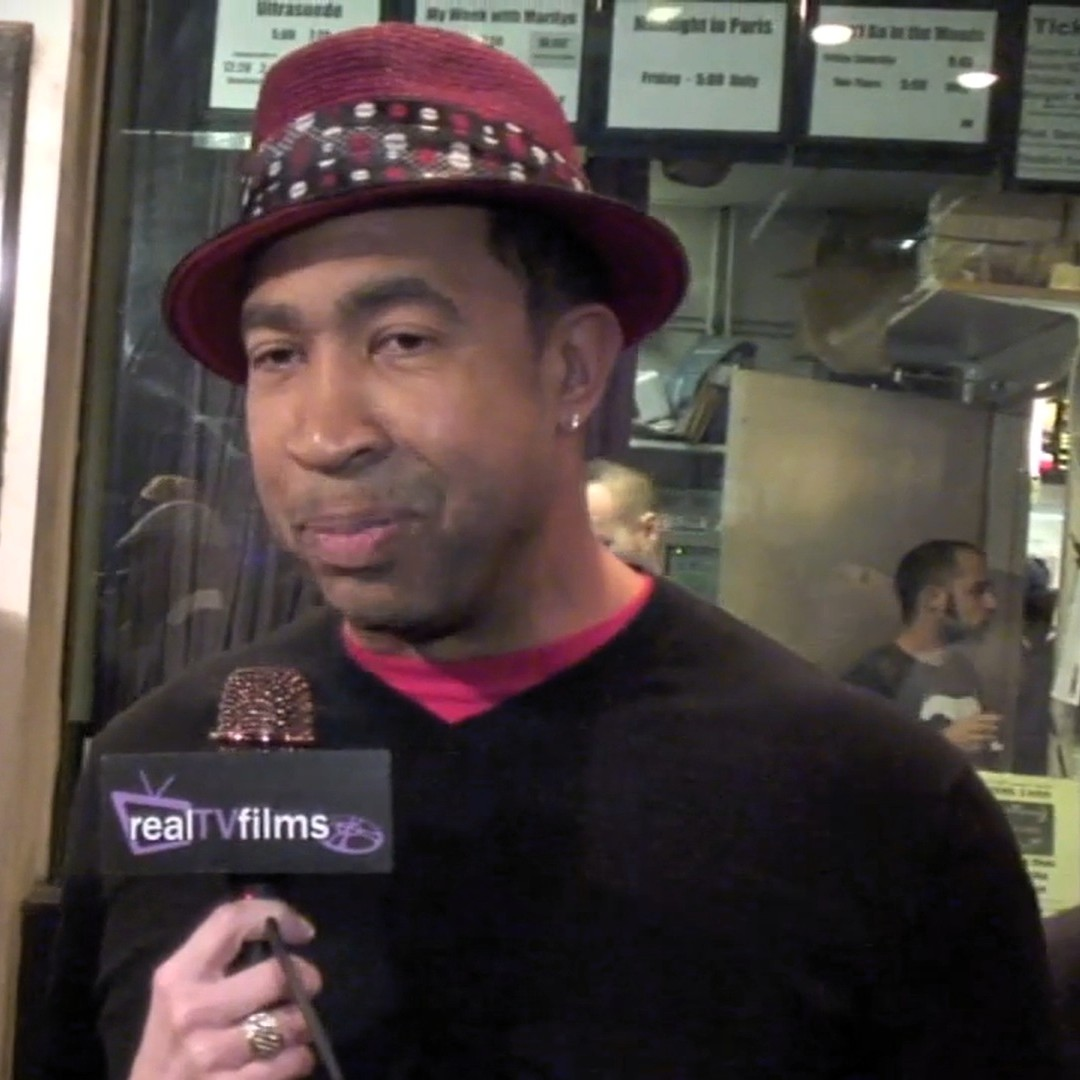
- Jones in 2012
- Occupation: Actor
- Years active: 1985–present

John Marshall Jones is an American actor. He is most known for his portrayal of Floyd Henderson on The WB sitcom television series Smart Guy.

== Career ==
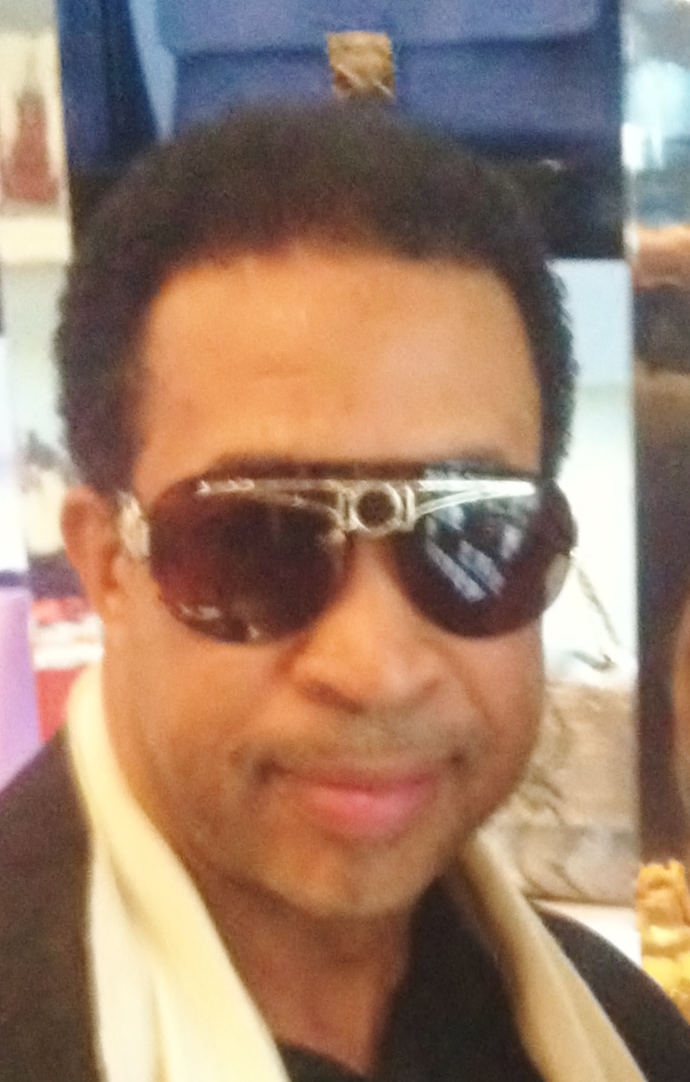
Jones in 2011

Since 2021, Jones has had a recurring role as U.S. Air Force General Nelson Bradford in the Apple TV+ original science fiction space drama series For All Mankind.

== Filmography ==
=== Film ===
Year	Title	Role	Notes
1985	Screen Test	Italian Henchman	
1987	Good Morning, Vietnam	Military Police Officer #2	
1988	Tapeheads	Hitman #2	
1989	Casualties of War	Military Police Officer	
1989	Welcome Home	Dwayne	
1990	Crazy People	Montesque	
1990	Taking Care Of Business	LeBradford Brown	
1991	Hell Hath No Fury	Johnson	TV movie
1991	The Doctor	Anthony	
1991	Deception: A Mother's Secret	-	
1992	White Men Can't Jump	Walter	
1994	Out of Darkness	Albert Price	TV movie
1994	Floundering	Bodyguard	
1995	A Dangerous Affair	Detective Webber	TV movie
1996	Sgt. Bilko	Sgt Henshaw	
1996	The Sand Angels	Homeless Witness	Video
1997	She's So Lovely	Leonard	
1997	Con Air	Gator	
1998	Noah	Ernie	TV movie
2001	Bailey's Mistake	Tyler	TV movie
2002	Like Mike	NBA Player	
2003	Sex And The Green Card	Silas	Short
2006	Fifty Pills	Housing Manager	
2009	The Guest at the Central Park West	Terrance Barlow	
2012	Who Killed Soul Glow?	-	
2012	Libelle	Commissioner Steele	TV movie
2014	Sweaty Booty Cheeks	Actor	Short
2016	Mission NinetyTwo: Dragonfly	Commissioner Steele	
2016	Paint It Black	Officer Jones	
2017	The Last Revolutionary	Jack Armstrong	
2018	Rust Creek	Commander Douglas Slattery	
2019	The Curse of La Llorona	Mr. Hankins	
2019	Defrost: The Virtual Series	WorldCast Host	Short
2021	Remember Me	Leander	Short
2024	Watchmen Chapter 1	Hooded Justice, General #1, Criminal #2 (voice)	Direct-to-Video
2024	Watchmen Chapter 2	Malcolm Long, Otis, General #1 (voice)	Direct-to-Video

=== Television ===
Year	Title	Role	Notes
1986	Crime Story	Prisoner L. Vee Rachmone	Episode: "Justice Hits the Skids"
1987	Amen	The Moving Man	Episode: "Dueling Ministers"
1987–88	Frank's Place	Gregory	Recurring Cast
1988	Matlock	TV Crewman	Episode: "The Lovelorn"
1988–89	China Beach	Fluke	Guest Cast: Season 1–2
1989	Family Ties	SGT Tom Davis	Episode: "Basic Training"
1989	Roseanne	George	Episode: "Five of a Kind"
1989	Coach	Stacey	Episode: "Dauber's Got a Girl"
1990	True Colors	Store Owner	Episode: "A Pair of Cranks"
1990	Married People	Joey Williams	Episode: "Live and Let Go"
1991	Home Improvement	Rick	Episode: "Off Sides"
1992	Martin	Caller #3 (voice)	Episode: "Things I Do for Love"
1992–93	Melrose Place	Terrence Haggard	Recurring Cast: Season 1
1993	A Different World	Otis Curtis	Episode: "Dancing Machines"
1993	Joe's Life	Ray Wharton	Main Cast
1995	Me and the Boys	Robert	Episode: "Money to Burn"
1995	ER	Mr. Gaither	Recurring Cast: Season 1
1996	Diagnosis Murder	Don Farabee	Episode: "The ABC's of Murder"
1997–99	Smart Guy	Floyd Henderson	Main Cast
2000	Any Day Now	-	Episode: "Pay Your Dues"
2000	Nash Bridges	Brother Bliss	Episode: "Line of Sight"
2001	Soul Food	Roy Johnson	Episode: "This Crazy Life"
2001	The Parkers	Ernest Orange	Episode: "Blind Date Mistake"
2001	Dead Last	Agent Pearson	Episode: "The Problems With Corruption"
2002	The Division	Mrs. Rios' Lawyer	Episode: "Insult to the Body"
2002	Providence	Richard Zaks	Episode: "Act Naturally"
2002–03	John Doe	Frank Hayes	Main Cast
2003	Nip/Tuck	Victor	Episode: "Kurt Dempsey"
2003	Malcolm in the Middle	Cop	Episode: "Christmas Trees"
2003–05	Joan of Arcadia	Chess Player God	Recurring Cast: Season 1, Guest: Season 2
2004	NCIS	Detective Hanley	Episode: "Dead Man Talking"
2004	Rodney	Burt	Episode: "Pilot"
2004–05	Still Standing	Maxwell 'Mack' McDaniel	Recurring Cast: Season 2–3
2005	Center of the Universe	Burt	Episode: "If You Love Something Leave It Alone"
2006	Bones	Joe Noland	Episode: "The Woman in the Sand"
2007	Boston Legal	Adam Murch	Episode: "Nuts"
2007	Dexter	Curtis Barnes	Episode: "See-Through"
2009–13	The Troop	Mr. Stockley	Main Cast
2011	Last Man Standing	Frank	Episode: "Home Security"
2012	Pretty Little Liars	Mr. Tamborelli	Episode: "The Naked Truth"
2012	Glee	Chili	Episode: "The Spanish Teacher"
2012	Eagleheart	African Narrator (voice)	Episode: "Bringing Down Bunju"
2012	Jane By Design	-	Recurring Cast
2012–15	Hart of Dixie	Wally Maynard	Guest: Season 1, Recurring Cast: Season 2–4
2013	The Crazy Ones	Mitch	Episode: "Bad Dad"
2015	Shameless	Lungs	Episode: "I'm the Liver"
2015	The Mentalist	Dan Glover	Recurring Cast: Season 7
2015	Battle Creek	Jacob	Episode: "Old Flames"
2015	Criminal Minds	Detective Mike Warner	Episode: "The Job"
2015	The League	Referee	Episode: "The Block"
2015–19	In the Cut	Clevon "Smitty" Smith	Main Cast: Season 1–2, Recurring Cast: Season 3–5
2016	Bones	Gary Lempke	Episode: "The Movie in the Making"
2016	Mann & Wife	Lieutenant Eric Snow	Recurring Cast: Season 2
2016	Rectify	Pickle	Recurring Cast: Season 4
2016–18	Bosch	Special Agent Jay Griffin	Recurring Cast: Season 2 & 4, Guest: Season 3
2017	Son of Zorn	CEO Blake Erickson	Episode: "The Battle of Self-Acceptance"
2017	The Fosters	Detective Bruckner	Recurring Cast: Season 4
2017	S.W.A.T.	Detective Sal Marcus	Episode: "Pamilya"
2017–18	Shooter	Sheriff Brown	Recurring Cast: Season 2–3
2018–20	9-1-1	Dave Morrisey	Recurring Cast: Season 1, Guest: Season 3
2019	Grace and Frankie	Fitz	Episode: "The Crosswalk"
2019	Into the Dark	Sheriff	Episode: "I'm Just F*cking with You"
2019	Big Little Lies	John Davidson	Recurring Cast: Season 2
2019	Grand Hotel	Malcolm Parker	Recurring Cast
2019	The Morning Show	Noah	Episode: "In the Dark Night of the Soul It's Always 3:30 in the Morning"
2019–20	Alley Way	JJ	Recurring Cast: Season 2
2020	Paradise Lost	Uncle Ronny	Recurring Cast
2020	50 States of Fright	Andy	Episode: "The Golden Arm (Michigan) – Part 1-3"
2021	Magnum P.I.	Henry Wilson	Episode: "Someone to Watch Over Me"
2021	All American	Leonard Shaw	Episode: "All American: Homecoming"
2021	The Rookie	Mr. Andrews	Episode: "Fire Fight"
2021–22	For All Mankind	Nelson Bradford	Recurring Cast: Season 2, Guest: Season 3
2022	A Black Lady Sketch Show	Uncle Ronald	Episode: "It's a New Day, Africa America!"
2022	All Rise	Randall Mack	Episode: "I'll Be There"
2022	All American: Homecoming	Leonard Shaw	Recurring Cast: Season 1, Guest: Season 2
2023	Tiny Beautiful Things	Doctor	Episode: "Love"
2023	NCIS: Los Angeles	Jonathan Hunter	Episode: "The Reckoning"
2024	Quantum Leap	Davidson Best	Episode: "The Outsider"
2024	NCIS: Hawaiʻi	George Conrad	Episode: "Dead on Arrival"
2026	Malcolm in the Middle: Life's Still Unfair	Brian	Miniseries (2 episodes)
