= Rick D. Wasserman =

American voice actor

- Born: Rick Darrin Wasserman
- Other name: Rick Wasserman
- Occupation: Actor
- Years active: 1994–present

Rick Darrin Wasserman is an American voice, stage and television actor who voiced several animated projects and video games including Batman: Arkham City, The Last of Us, BioShock 2, Saints Row The Third, Lollipop Chainsaw, The Avengers: Earth's Mightiest Heroes, Planet Hulk, and Call of Duty. He is married to Tamara Ann Hogan.

== Early life and career ==
Wasserman graduated from Temple University with a BA in Theatre in 1995 and later from the University of Missouri with a MFA in Acting in 1998.

Known for his distinctive deep voice, his best known voice over roles include Thor in The Avengers: Earth's Mightiest Heroes, Clayface in Batman: Arkham City, Nicholai Ginovaef in Resident Evil: Operation Raccoon City, and the Hulk in Planet Hulk.

Wasserman has had a prolific career on stage since the late 1990s. In 2000, he played Irving Berlin in The Wilma Theater's production of The Tin Pan Alley Rag. In addition to critical acclaim, he also received a nomination for The John Barrymore Award for his performance.

== Filmography ==
=== Theatre ===
- Babes in Arms – Steve Edwards
- Brighton Beach Memoirs – Stan
- Complete Female Stage Beauty – Thomas Betterton
- Hamlet – Marcellus, Lucianus
- Happy End – Bill Cracker
- Henry IV, Part 1 – Hotspur
- Henry VIII – The Duke of Orleans
- Last Night of Ballyhoo – Joe Farcus, Peachy Weil
- Letters from Cuba – Enrique
- Lie of the Mind – Frankie
- Little Shop of Horrors – Seymour
- Love's Labor Lost – Costard
- Measure for Measure – Pompey
- Philadelphia, Here I Come! – Private Gar
- Richard III – Richard III
- Say Goodnight – George Burns
- The Baby Dance
- The Beaux' Stratagem – Archer
- The Last Days of Judas Iscariot – Freud, Matthew and Thomas
- The Lion King – Scar, Timon, Pumbaa, Zazu
- The Sunshine Boys
- The Tin Pan Alley Rag – Irving Berlin
- Disaster! – Tony Delvecchio

=== Live-action ===
==== Television ====
Year	Title	Role	Notes
2003	24	Alex Hewitt	2 Episodes
2008	Swingtown	Harry Reems	Episode: "Go Your Own Way"
2009	House M.D	Vince Pearson	Episode: "Epic Fail"
2011	Supah Ninjas	Nicholias Spaski, Checkmate	2 Episodes
2012	Burn Notice	Wes Foster	Episode: "Split Decision"
2021	The Flash	Godspeed Drone (voice)	3 episodes
2022	Danger Force	Gas Clown (voice)	2 episodes
2022	Werewolf by Night	Narrator (voice)	Television special

=== Voice acting ===
==== Film ====
Year	Title	Role	Notes
2010	Planet Hulk	Hulk	Direct-to-video
2010	Cats & Dogs 2: The Revenge of Kitty Galore	Rocky	
2016	Norm of the North	Henchman #3	
2016	Justice League vs. Teen Titans	Weather Wizard, Solomon Grundy, Atomic Skull	Direct-to-video
2016	Batman: The Killing Joke	Sal Maroni	Direct-to-video
2017	Transformers: The Last Knight	Knight of Iacon	Uncredited
2018	Constantine: City of Demons – The Movie	Mictlāntēcutli	
2021	Batman: The Long Halloween	Bodyguard	Direct-to-video
2022	Green Lantern: Beware My Power	Sinestro	Direct-to-video
2024	Watchmen Chapter 1	The Comedian	Direct-to-video
2024	Watchmen Chapter 2	The Comedian	Direct-to-video

==== Television ====
Year	Title	Role	Notes
2010	Black Panther	Radioactive Man	5 episodes
2010–2012	The Avengers: Earth's Mightiest Heroes	Thor, Absorbing Man, Surtur, Ymir, Dro'ge	38 episodes
2011	Scooby-Doo! Mystery Incorporated	Lord Infernacus, Boo the Cat	Episode: "Mystery Solvers Club State Finals"
2012	Hero Factory	Voltix	Episode: "Breakout"
2016	Avengers Assemble	Fixer / Techno	3 episodes
2019	Fast & Furious Spy Racers	Additional voices	
2022	Werewolf by Night	Narrator	Television special

==== Video games ====
Year	Title	Role	Notes
2009	Batman: Arkham Asylum	Joker's Henchmen, Young Jim Gordon	
2009	Marvel: Ultimate Alliance 2	Grim Reaper, Shocker	
2009	Dreamkiller	Devourer, Institute Boss, Taxi Driver	
2009	Brütal Legend	Bouncers, Organists, Druids, Warfathers	
2010	BioShock 2	Brute Splicers	
2010	StarCraft II: Wings of Liberty	Amon, Hybrid	
2011	Marvel vs. Capcom 3: Fate of Two Worlds	Thor	
2011	Dragon Age II	Arishok	
2011	Marvel Super Hero Squad Online	Fin Fang Foom	
2011	Thor: God of Thunder	Surtur	
2011	Transformers: Dark of the Moon	Air Raid	
2011	Batman: Arkham City	Clayface	
2011	Saints Row: The Third	Eddie "Killbane" Pryor	
2011	Ultimate Marvel vs. Capcom 3	Thor	
2012	Armored Core V	Zodiac No. 5, Zodiac No. 11, AC Pilot	
2012	Resident Evil: Operation Raccoon City	Nicholai Ginovaef	English Dub
2012	Diablo 3	Imperius - Archangel of Valor	
2012	Lollipop Chainsaw	Lewis Legend	
2012	Spec Ops: The Line	Elite Soldiers, Damned Scavenger	
2012	Call of Duty: Black Ops II	S.E.A.L. Announcer	
2013	Anarchy Reigns	Big Bull	English Dub
2013	Marvel Heroes	Thor, Bullseye, Cloak, Wizard	
2013	The Last of Us	Additional voices	
2013	Batman: Arkham Origins	Penguin Thugs, Black Mask Thugs	
2014	Diablo III: Reaper of Souls	Imperius	
2015	Evolve	Additional voices	
2015	Lego Jurassic World	Additional voices	
2015	Batman: Arkham Knight	Black Mask Thugs	
2015	StarCraft II: Legacy of the Void	Amon	
2016	XCOM 2	Soldier (Male)	
2016	Masquerada: Songs and Shadows	Kalden Azrus	Credited as Rick Wasserman
2016	Mafia III	Additional voices	Credited as Rick Wasserman
2016	Titanfall 2	Scorch	
2018	Call of Duty: Black Ops 4	Rush Announcer, Zombies Tutorial	
2018	Artifact	The Brass Herald	
2019	Marvel Ultimate Alliance 3	Thor	
2022	Marvel's Midnight Suns	Crossbones	
2023	Justice League: Cosmic Chaos	Ares, Lobo	
2024	Deadlock	Warden	

- Gears of War 3 – Michael Barrick
- The Bureau: XCOM Declassified – Origin
- Warcraft series - Sargeras

==== Rides/Attractions ====
Year	Title	Role	Notes
2012	Marvel Super Heroes 4D	Thor	
2015	Justice League: Battle for Metropolis	Henchman #1, Henchman #2	
