= Tom Stechschulte =

American film and television actor (1948–2021)

- Occupations: Film, television actor
- Years active: 1979–2009

Thomas Andrew Stechschulte (November 1948 – June 7, 2021) was an American film and television actor. His most prominent role may have been that of the presidential candidate Robert Arthur in The Manchurian Candidate (2004). He has also had guest appearances on the television series Law & Order (as Judge Harold Rockwell), Law & Order: Criminal Intent, and Mrs. Columbo.

Stechschulte was a prolific audiobook narrator, having performed, among others: Kent Haruf's Plainsong, Cormac McCarthy's No Country for Old Men and The Road, Tim O'Brien's The Things They Carried, H.G. Bissinger's Friday Night Lights, Harold Keith's Rifles for Watie, and Dennis Lehane's Shutter Island. He gave voice to several members of the Holland Family in various James Lee Burke novels, alternating with Will Patton. He also narrated the Watchmen: Motion Comic series.

He died on June 7, 2021, at the age of 72.

== Filmography ==
Year	Title	Role
1977	First Monday in October (Broadway)	Mason Woods
1982	The Clairvoyant	Jim Dearden
1991	What About Bob?	Lennie / Producer
1993	Simple Justice (PBS American Experience)	Justice William O. Douglas
2001	Murder in Small Town X	William Lambert
2004	The Manchurian Candidate	Robert Arthur
2006	Fields of Freedom	Sgt. June Kimble
2008	All Is Normal	Doctor Bradshaw
