= Primetime Emmy Award for Outstanding Hosted Nonfiction Series or Special =

American entertainment award

- Awarded for: Outstanding Hosted Nonfiction Series or Special
- Country: United States
- Presented by: Academy of Television Arts & Sciences
- First award: 1978
- Currently held by: Tucci in Italy (2026)
- Website: emmys.com

The Primetime Emmy Award for Outstanding Hosted Nonfiction Series or Special is handed out annually at the Creative Arts Emmy Award ceremony. The award was called Outstanding Informational Series or Special from 2013 until 2019, and was also presented from 1978 to 1998. From 1998 until 2012, informational series competed in Outstanding Nonfiction Series.

Beginning in 2020, the Academy of Television Arts & Sciences renamed the category to reflect that it recognizes "personality-driven programs in which the host drives the show's narrative; includes documentaries, travelogues, segmented/magazine program and interview formats."

== Winners and nominations ==
=== 1970s ===
Year	Program	Recipients	Network
1975 (27th)	Special Classification of Outstanding Program and Individual Achievement (Note: As a juried award, nominees had to garner 50% approval to win the award.)		
1975 (27th)	The American Film Institute Salute to James Cagney	Paul W. Keyes and George Stevens Jr., producers	CBS
1975 (27th)	Masterpiece Theatre	Alistair Cooke, host	PBS
1975 (27th)	86th Annual Pasadena Tournament of Roses Parade	Dick Schneider	NBC
1975 (27th)	The American Film Institute Salute to Orson Welles	Paul W. Keyes and George Stevens Jr., producers	CBS
1975 (27th)	Bicentennial Minutes	John Hueners, Jack Stewart	CBS
1975 (27th)	The Dick Cavett Show	Dick Cavett, John Gilroy	ABC
1975 (27th)	That's Entertainment: 50 Years of MGM (ABC's Wide World of Entertainment)	Jack Haley Jr., executive producer; Jimmie Baker, producer	ABC
1975 (27th)	Tomorrow	Tom Snyder, host	NBC
1978 (30th)	Outstanding Informational Series		
1978 (30th)	The Body Human	Thomas W. Moore, executive producer; Alfred R. Kelman, producer	CBS
1978 (30th)	Between the Wars	Alan Landsburg, executive producer; Anthony Potter, series producer	Syndicated
1978 (30th)	Cousteau: Oasis in Space	Philippe Cousteau, executive producer; Andrew Solt, producer	PBS
1978 (30th)	Mutual of Omaha's Wild Kingdom	Don Meier, producer	Syndicated
1978 (30th)	Nova	John Angier, executive producer	PBS
1978 (30th)	Outstanding Informational Special		
1978 (30th)	The Great Whales: National Geographic Special	Thomas Skinner and Dennis B. Kane, executive producers; Nicolas Noxon, producer	PBS
1978 (30th)	Bing Crosby: His Life and Legend	Frank Konigsberg, executive producer; Marshall Flaum, producer	ABC
1978 (30th)	Calypso's Search for Atlantis: The Cousteau Odyssey	Jacques-Yves Cousteau and Philippe Cousteau, executive producers; Andrew Solt, producer	PBS
1978 (30th)	The Treasures of Tutankhamun	Donald Knox, executive producer; Valerie Gentile, producer	PBS
1978 (30th)	Tut: The Boy King	George A. Heinemann, executive producer	NBC
1979 (31st)	Outstanding Informational Program		
1979 (31st)	Scared Straight!	Arnold Shapiro, producer	Syndicated
1979 (31st)	The Body Human: The Sexes	Thomas W. Moore, executive producer; Robert E. Fuisz and Alfred R. Kelman, producers; Charles A. Bangert and Vivian R. Moss, co-producers	CBS
1979 (31st)	Who Are the DeBolts? And Where Did They Get Nineteen Kids?	Henry Winkler, executive producer; John Korty, Warren Lockhart and Dan McCann, producers	ABC

=== 1980s ===
Year	Program	Recipients	Network
1980 (32nd)	Outstanding Informational Program		
1980 (32nd)	The Body Human: The Magic Sense	Thomas W. Moore, executive producer; Robert E. Fuisz and Alfred R. Kelman, producers; Charles A. Bangert and Vivian R. Moss, co-producers	CBS
1980 (32nd)	Bill Moyers Journal	Joan Konner, executive producer; Bill Moyers, star	PBS
1980 (32nd)	The Body Human: The Body Beautiful	Thomas W. Moore, executive producer; Robert E. Fuisz and Alfred R. Kelman, producers; Charles A. Bangert, Vivian R. Moss and Geof Bartz, co-producers	CBS
1980 (32nd)	The Nile: The Cousteau Odyssey	Jacques-Yves Cousteau and Philippe Cousteau, executive producers	PBS
1980 (32nd)	Picasso: A Painter's Diary	George Page, executive producer; Perry Miller Adato, producer	PBS
1981 (33rd)	Outstanding Informational Series		
1981 (33rd)	Steve Allen's Meeting of Minds	Loring d'Usseau, producer	PBS
1981 (33rd)	The Barbara Walters Specials	Don Mischer, executive producer; Joann Goldberg, producer	ABC
1981 (33rd)	Cosmos	Adrian Malone, executive producer; Geoffrey Haines-Stiles and David Kennard, senior producers; Gregory Andorfer, producer	PBS
1981 (33rd)	Profile: Lillian Hellman	David Dowe, producer	PBS
1981 (33rd)	Real People	George Schlatter, executive producer; Bob Wynn and John Barbour, producers	NBC
1981 (33rd)	Outstanding Informational Special		
1981 (33rd)	The Body Human: The Bionic Breakthrough	Thomas W. Moore, executive producer; Robert E. Fuisz and Alfred R. Kelman, producers; Charles A. Bangert and Nancy Smith, co-producers	CBS
1981 (33rd)	The Body Human: The Sexes II	Thomas W. Moore, executive producer; Robert E. Fuisz and Alfred R. Kelman, producers; Charles A. Bangert and Vivian R. Moss, co-producers	CBS
1981 (33rd)	Gorilla: National Geographic Special	Dennis B. Kane and Thomas Skinner, executive producers; Barbara Jampel, producer	PBS
1981 (33rd)	Making M*A*S*H	Michael Hirsh, producer	PBS
1981 (33rd)	Starring Katharine Hepburn	George Page, executive producer; David Heeley, producer	PBS
1982 (34th)	Outstanding Informational Series		
1982 (34th)	Creativity with Bill Moyers	Mert Koplin, Charles Grinker and Bill Moyers, executive producers; Betsy McCarthy, coordinating producer	PBS
1982 (34th)	The Barbara Walters Specials	Don Mischer, executive producer; Joann Goldberg, producer	ABC
1982 (34th)	The Dick Cavett Show	Robin Breed, producer	PBS
1982 (34th)	Entertainment Tonight	Jim Bellows, executive producer; Andy Friendly, John Goldhammer and Vin Di Bona, producers	Syndicated
1982 (34th)	Middletown	Peter Davis, producer	PBS
1982 (34th)	Outstanding Informational Special		
1982 (34th)	The Making of Raiders of the Lost Ark	Sid Ganis, executive producer; Howard Kazanjian, producer	PBS
1982 (34th)	Great Movie Stunts: Raiders of the Lost Ark	Sid Ganis, executive producer; Robert Guenette, producer	CBS
1982 (34th)	High Hopes: The Capra Years	Carl Pingitore and Frank Capra Jr., producers	NBC
1982 (34th)	Hollywood: The Gift of Laughter	David L. Wolper, executive producer; Jack Haley Jr., producer	ABC
1982 (34th)	Marva Collins: Excellence in Education	Kathleen Maloney, producer	PBS
1982 (34th)	Outstanding Individual Achievement - Informational Programming (Note: As a juried award, nominees had to garner 50% approval to win the award. The nominee did not meet the benchmark and no award was given.)		
1982 (34th)	Omni: The New Frontier	Peter Ustinov, host	Syndicated
1983 (35th)	Outstanding Informational Series		
1983 (35th)	The Barbara Walters Specials	Beth Polson, producer; Barbara Walters, host	ABC
1983 (35th)	Entertainment Tonight	George Merlis and Jim Bellows, executive producers; Vin Di Bona, producer; Bruce Cook, coordinating producer	Syndicated
1983 (35th)	Over Easy with Mary Martin & Jim Hartz	Richard R. Rector and Jules Power, executive producers; Ben Bayol and Janice Tunder, producers; Jim Hartz and Mary Martin, hosts	PBS
1983 (35th)	Real People	George Schlatter, executive producer; Bob Wynn, producer	NBC
1983 (35th)	Screenwriters: Words Into Image	Terry Sanders and Freida Lee Mock, producers	PBS
1983 (35th)	Outstanding Informational Special		
1983 (35th)	The Body Human: The Living Code	Thomas W. Moore, executive producer; Robert E. Fuisz and Alfred R. Kelman, producers; Charles A. Bangert, Franklin Getchel and Nancy Smith, co-producer	CBS
1983 (35th)	I, Leonardo: A Journey of the Mind	Chandler Cowles and Helen Kristt Radin, executive producers; Lee R. Bobker, producer	CBS
1983 (35th)	King Penguin: Stranded Beyond the Falklands	Aubrey Buxton, executive producer; Colin Willock, producer	CBS
1983 (35th)	The Making of Gandhi: Mr. Attenborough and Mr. Gandhi	Jenny Barraclough, producer	PBS
1983 (35th)	Mario Lanza: The American Caruso	John Musilli and Stephan Chodorov, executive producers; JoAnn Young, producer	PBS
1983 (35th)	Outstanding Individual Achievement - Informational Programming (Note: As a juried award, nominees had to garner 50% approval to win the award. The nominees did not meet the benchmark and no award was given.)		
1983 (35th)	Entertainment Tonight	Steve Edwards, host	Syndicated
1983 (35th)	I, Leonardo: A Journey of the Mind	Frank Langella, performer	CBS
1984 (36th)	Outstanding Informational Series		
1984 (36th)	A Walk Through the 20th Century with Bill Moyers	Mert Koplin, senior executive producer; Charles Grinker and Sanford H. Fisher, executive producers; Betsy McCarthy, coordinating producer; David Grubin and Ronald Blumer, producers; Bill Moyers, host	PBS
1984 (36th)	The Barbara Walters Specials	Beth Polson, producer; Barbara Walters, host	ABC
1984 (36th)	Cousteau/Amazon	Jacques-Yves Cousteau, executive producer/host; Jean-Michel Cousteau, executive producer; Mose Richards and John Soh, producers	Syndicated
1984 (36th)	Entertainment Tonight	George Merlis, executive producer; Jack Reilly and Vin Di Bona, producers; Stuart Crowner and Bruce Cook, coordinating producers	Syndicated
1984 (36th)	Siskel & Ebert at the Movies	Joseph Antelo, executive producer; Nancy De Los Santos, producer; Roger Ebert and Gene Siskel, hosts	Syndicated
1984 (36th)	Outstanding Informational Special		
1984 (36th)	America Remembers John F. Kennedy	Thomas Horton, producer	Syndicated
1984 (36th)	The Body Human: The Journey Within	John D. Backe and Thomas W. Moore, executive producer; Alfred R. Kelman and Robert E. Fuisz, producers; Bob Eisenhardt and Nancy Smith, co-producers	CBS
1984 (36th)	Dance in America: Balanchine (Great Performances)	Jac Venza, executive producer; Judy Kinberg, producer	PBS
1984 (36th)	Lifestyles of the Rich and Famous	Robin Leach, executive producer; Jim Cross, supervising producer	Syndicated
1984 (36th)	The Lions of Etosha: King of the Beasts	Aubrey Buxton, executive producer; Colin Willock, producer	CBS
1985 (37th)	Outstanding Informational Series		
1985 (37th)	The Living Planet	Richard Brock, executive producer; Adrian Warren, Ned Kelly and Andrew Neal, producers	PBS
1985 (37th)	At the Movies with Siskel & Ebert	Joseph Antelo, executive producer; Laura C. Hernandez and Nancy De Los Santos, producers; Roger Ebert and Gene Siskel, hosts	Syndicated
1985 (37th)	The Barbara Walters Specials	Beth Polson, producer; Barbara Walters, host	ABC
1985 (37th)	Entertainment Tonight	Jack Reilly, producer; Stuart Crowner and Gary Grossman, coordinating producers	Syndicated
1985 (37th)	Heart of the Dragon	Peter Montagnon, executive producer; Patrick W. Lui, Nigel Houghton and Alasdair Clayre, producers; Herb Bloom, coordinating producer	PBS
1985 (37th)	Outstanding Informational Special		
1985 (37th)	Cousteau: Mississippi	Jacques-Yves Cousteau, executive producer/host; Jean-Michel Cousteau, executive producer; Andrew Solt, producer	Syndicated
1985 (37th)	Cousteau/Amazon: Snowstorm in the Jungle	Jacques-Yves Cousteau, executive producer/host; Jean-Michel Cousteau, executive producer	Syndicated
1985 (37th)	A Day in the Country: Impressionism and the French Landscape	Ann Zane Shanks and Bob Shanks, producers	PBS
1985 (37th)	Judy Garland: The Concert Years (Great Performances)	Jac Venza, executive producer; Joan Kramer and David Heeley, producers	PBS
1985 (37th)	Missing... Have You Seen This Person?	Dave Bell, executive producer; John Cosgrove, Terry Dunn Meurer and Chris Pye, producers	NBC
1985 (37th)	Outstanding Individual Achievement - Informational Programming - Performing (Note: As a juried award, nominees had to garner 50% approval to win the award. The nominee did not meet the benchmark and no award was given.)		
1985 (37th)	The Secret World of the Very Young	Ruth Gordon, performer	CBS
1986 (38th)	Outstanding Informational Series		
1986 (38th)	Laurence Olivier: A Life (Great Performances)	Nick Evans and Nick Elliott, executive producers; Bob Bee, producer	PBS
1986 (38th)	Planet Earth	Thomas Skinner, executive producer; Gregory Andorfer, series producer; Georgann Kane, coordinating producer	PBS
1986 (38th)	The Barbara Walters Specials	Beth Polson, producer; Barbara Walters, host	ABC
1986 (38th)	Entertainment Tonight	Jack Reilly, producer; Stuart Crowner and Gary Grossman, coordinating producers	Syndicated
1986 (38th)	In Search of the Trojan War	Bill Lyons, producer	PBS
1986 (38th)	Outstanding Informational Special		
1986 (38th)	W.C. Fields: Straight Up	Robert B. Weide, executive producer; Ronald J. Fields, co-producer	PBS
1986 (38th)	The Indomitable Teddy Roosevelt	Harrison Engle, producer; Marilyn S. Engle, co-producer	ABC
1986 (38th)	The Spencer Tracy Legacy: A Tribute by Katharine Hepburn	George Paris and George Paige, executive producers; David Heeley and Joan Kramer, producers; Katharine Hepburn, host	PBS
1986 (38th)	The Statue of Liberty	Marcie Setlow, executive producer; Ken Burns and Buddy Squires, producers	PBS
1986 (38th)	We Are The World: A Year of Giving	Ken Kragen and Kenneth Yates, executive producers; Howard G. Malley and Craig Golin, producers	CBS
1986 (38th)	Outstanding Individual Achievement - Informational Programming (Note: As a juried award, nominees had to garner 50% approval to win the award. The nominees did not meet the benchmark and no award was given.)		
1986 (38th)	Nature	George Page, host	PBS
1986 (38th)	Oceanquest	Shawn Weatherly, host	NBC
1986 (38th)	Winds of Everest	John Denver, host	PBS
1987 (39th)	Outstanding Informational Series		
1987 (39th)	Smithsonian World	Adrian Malone, executive producer; David Grubin, producer	PBS
1987 (39th)	Unknown Chaplin (American Masters)	Kevin Brownlow and David Gill, producers	PBS
1987 (39th)	The Barbara Walters Specials	Phyllis McGrady, producer; Barbara Walters, host	ABC
1987 (39th)	Entertainment Tonight	David Nuell, executive producer; Jim Van Messel, senior producer; Barry Berk, supervising producer; Bob Flick, line producer; Gary Grossman, coordinating producer	Syndicated
1987 (39th)	Siskel & Ebert	Donna La Pietra, executive producer; Andrea Gronvall, producer; Roger Ebert and Gene Siskel, hosts	Syndicated
1987 (39th)	Outstanding Informational Special		
1987 (39th)	Agnes, the Indomitable DeMille (Great Performances)	Jac Venza, executive producer; Judy Kinberg, producer	PBS
1987 (39th)	Billie Holiday: The Long Night of Lady Day (American Masters)	Angus Trowbridge, executive producer; Alan Yentob, producer	PBS
1987 (39th)	James Stewart: A Wonderful Life (Great Performances)	Jac Venza and George Paris, executive producers; Joan Kramer and David Heeley, producers	PBS
1987 (39th)	Minnelli on Minnelli: Liza Remembers Vincente	David Niven Jr., Jack Haley Jr. and Richard Schickel, producers; Liza Minnelli, host	PBS
1987 (39th)	Scared Straight! 10 Years Later	Arnold Shapiro, executive producer/producer; Anthony Cassara and Greg Nathanson, executive producers	Syndicated
1987 (39th)	Outstanding Individual Achievement - Informational Programming - Performing (Note: As a juried award, nominees had to garner 50% approval to win the award. The nominee did not meet the benchmark and no award was given.)		
1987 (39th)	Eleanor: In Her Own Words (American Playhouse)	Lee Remick, performer	PBS
1988 (40th)	Outstanding Informational Series		
1988 (40th)	Buster Keaton: A Hard Act to Follow (American Masters)	Kevin Brownlow and David Gill, producers	PBS
1988 (40th)	Nature	David Heeley, executive producer; Fred Kaufman, series producer	PBS
1988 (40th)	The Barbara Walters Specials	Phyllis McGrady, producer; Barbara Walters, host	ABC
1988 (40th)	Entertainment Tonight	David Nuell, executive producer; Jim Van Messel, senior producer; Barry Berk, supervising producer; Gary Grossman, coordinating producer	Syndicated
1988 (40th)	Siskel & Ebert	Larry J. Dieckhaus, executive producer; Andrea Gronvall, producer; Roger Ebert and Gene Siskel, hosts	Syndicated
1988 (40th)	Outstanding Informational Special		
1988 (40th)	Dear America: Letters Home from Vietnam	Bill Couturié and Thomas Bird, producers	HBO
1988 (40th)	Bacall on Bogart (Great Performances)	Jac Venza, executive producer; Joan Kramer and David Heeley, producers; Lauren Bacall, host	PBS
1988 (40th)	Directed by William Wyler (American Masters)	Catherine Wyler, executive producer; Catherine Tatge, producer	PBS
1988 (40th)	George Gershwin Remembered (American Masters)	John H. Williams and Kirk D'Amico, executive producers; Peter Adam, producer	PBS
1988 (40th)	Legacy of the Hollywood Blacklist	Loren Stephens, executive producer; Ellen Geiger, executive producer for KCET; Judy Chaikin, producer	PBS
1988 (40th)	Outstanding Individual Achievement - Informational Programming (Note: As a juried award, nominees had to garner 50% approval to win the award. The nominee did not meet the benchmark and no award was given.)		
1988 (40th)	Portrait of America: New York City	Hal Holbrook, host	TBS
1989 (41st)	Outstanding Informational Series		
1989 (41st)	Nature	David Heeley, executive producer; Fred Kaufman, series producer	PBS
1989 (41st)	Cops	John Langley and Malcolm Barbour, executive producers; Paul Stojanovich and Andrew Thomas, co-producers	Fox
1989 (41st)	A Current Affair	Gerald Stone, executive producer; Peter Brennan, senior producer	Syndicated
1989 (41st)	Entertainment Tonight	David Nuell, executive producer; Jim Van Messel, senior producer; Barry Berk, supervising producer; Cliff Lachman, coordinating producer	Syndicated
1989 (41st)	Unsolved Mysteries	Terry Dunn Meurer and John Cosgrove, executive producers; Ed Horwitz and Chris Pye, supervising producers; Stuart Schwartz, coordinating producer	NBC
1989 (41st)	Outstanding Informational Special		
1989 (41st)	Lillian Gish: The Actor's Life for Me (American Masters)	Freida Lee Mock and Susan Lacy, executive producers; Terry Sanders, producer; William T. Cartwright, co-producer	PBS
1989 (41st)	Aids: The Global Explosion	Bob Cawley, executive producer; Alex Paen and Keith Shaw, producers	Syndicated
1989 (41st)	A Duke Named Ellington (American Masters)	Susan Lacy, executive producer; Terry Carter, producer; Leonard Malone, co-producer	PBS
1989 (41st)	The 50th Barbara Walters Special	Bill Geddie, producer; Barbara Walters, host	ABC
1989 (41st)	The Unforgettable Nat 'King' Cole	Martin Haxby and Anthony Wall, executive producers; Jo Lustig, producer	Disney
1989 (41st)	Outstanding Performance in Informational Programming (Note: As a juried award, nominees had to garner 50% approval to win the award.)		
1989 (41st)	Portrait of America: Alaska	Hal Holbrook, host	TBS
1989 (41st)	Crimes of Passion	James Woods, host	ABC

=== 1990s ===
Year	Program	Recipients	Network
1990 (42nd)	Outstanding Informational Series		
1990 (42nd)	Smithsonian World	Adrian Malone, executive producer; Sandra W. Bradley, producer	PBS
1990 (42nd)	America's Most Wanted	Michael Linder, executive producer; Dan Kavanaugh, producer; Cord Keller, co-producer	Fox
1990 (42nd)	Cops	John Langley and Malcolm Barbour, executive producers; Paul Stojanovich, producer; Bertram van Munster, co-producer	Fox
1990 (42nd)	Entertainment Tonight	Jim Van Messel and David Nuell, executive producers; Barry Berk, supervising producer	Syndicated
1990 (42nd)	Unsolved Mysteries	John Cosgrove and Terry Dunn Meurer, executive producers; Chris Pye and Ed Horwitz, supervising producers; Stuart Schwartz, coordinating producer	NBC
1990 (42nd)	Outstanding Informational Special		
1990 (42nd)	Bob Fosse: Steam Heat (Great Performances)	Jac Venza, executive producer; Judy Kinberg, producer	PBS
1990 (42nd)	Broadway's Dreamers: The Legacy of the Group Theatre (American Masters)	Jac Venza and Susan Lacy, executive producers; Joan Kramer, David Heeley and Joanne Woodward, producers	PBS
1990 (42nd)	The Barbara Walters Summer Special with Billy Crystal, Jay Leno and Robin Williams	Bill Geddie, producer; Wendy Roth, coordinating producer; Barbara Walters, host	ABC
1990 (42nd)	Harold Lloyd: The Third Genius (American Masters)	Susan Lacy and Suzanne Lloyd Hayes, executive producers; David Gill and Kevin Brownlow, producers; Harlene Freezer, coordinating producer	PBS
1990 (42nd)	I Love Lucy: The Very First Show	B. Donald Grant, executive producer; Billy Van Zandt and Jane Milmore, producers; Jason Shubb, coordinating producer	CBS
1990 (42nd)	Outstanding Performance in Informational Programming (Note: As a juried award, nominees had to garner 50% approval to win the award.)		
1990 (42nd)	A Conversation with...	George Burns, host	Disney
1990 (42nd)	Broadway's Dreamers: The Legacy of the Group Theatre (American Masters)	Joanne Woodward, host	PBS
1991 (43rd)	Outstanding Informational Series		
1991 (43rd)	The Civil War	Ken Burns and Ric Burns, producers; Stephen Ives, Julie Dunfey and Mike Hill, co-producers; Catherine Eisele-Yang, coordinating producer	PBS
1991 (43rd)	The Astronomers	Blaine Baggett, executive producer; Peter R. Baker, series producer; James F. Golway, producer; Julio Moline, coordinating producer	PBS
1991 (43rd)	Entertainment Tonight	David Nuell and Jim Van Messel, executive producers; Barry Berk, supervising producer; Jim Ziegler and Bill Olsen, producers	Syndicated
1991 (43rd)	Smithsonian World	Adrian Malone, executive producer; Sandra Wentworth Bradley, producer	PBS
1991 (43rd)	Unsolved Mysteries	John Cosgrove and Terry Dunn Meurer, executive producers; Ed Horwitz and Raymond Bridgers, supervising producers; Stuart Schwartz, coordinating producer	NBC
1991 (43rd)	Outstanding Informational Special		
1991 (43rd)	Edward R. Murrow: This Reporter (American Masters)	Susan Lacy, executive producer; Susan Steinberg, producer; Elizabeth Kreutz and Harlene Freezer, co-producers	PBS
1991 (43rd)	All in the Family: 20th Anniversary Special	Norman Lear and Mark E. Pollack, executive producers; Michael Doqui, supervising producer; George Zaloom and Les Mayfield, producers; Jean-Michel Michenaud, line producer	CBS
1991 (43rd)	The Barbara Walters Summer Special with Whoopi Goldberg, Jeremy Irons and Sophia Loren	Bill Geddie, producer; Wendy Roth, coordinating producer; Barbara Walters, host	ABC
1991 (43rd)	Cheers: 200th Anniversary Special	James Burrows, Glen Charles, Les Charles, Cherie Steinkellner, Bill Steinkellner and Phoef Sutton, executive producers; Tim Berry, producer; Andy Ackerman, Brian Pollack, Mert Rich, Dan O'Shannon, Tom Anderson and Larry Balmagia, co-producers	NBC
1991 (43rd)	The Very Best of The Ed Sullivan Show	Andrew Solt, executive producer; Susan F. Walker, supervising producer	CBS
1992 (44th)	Outstanding Informational Series		
1992 (44th)	MGM: When Lions Roared	Joni Levin, producer	TNT
1992 (44th)	Entertainment Tonight	Jim Van Messel and David Nuell, executive producers; Barry Berk, supervising producer; Bill Olson and Jim Ziegler, producers	Syndicated
1992 (44th)	Later with Bob Costas	Lou Del Prete and Matthew McCarthy, executive producers; Bruce Cornblatt and Fred Rothenberg, senior producers; Cynthia Parsons and Michael Weinberg, producers; Bob Costas, host	NBC
1992 (44th)	Siskel & Ebert	Larry Dieckhaus, executive producer; Jim Murphy, supervising producer; Andrea Gronvall, producer; Gene Siskel and Roger Ebert, hosts	Syndicated
1992 (44th)	Unsolved Mysteries	Terry Dunn Meurer and John Cosgrove, executive producers; Stuart Schwartz, coordinating producer; Raymond Bridgers and Ed Horwitz, supervising producers	NBC
1992 (44th)	Outstanding Informational Special		
1992 (44th)	Abortion: Desperate Choices (America Undercover)	Susan Froemke, executive producer	HBO
1992 (44th)	The Barbara Walters Summer Special with Michelle Pfeiffer, Anthony Hopkins and Tom Cruise	Bill Geddie, producer; Barbara Walters, host	ABC
1992 (44th)	Empire of the Air: The Men Who Made Radio	Ken Burns, Morgan Wesson and Tom Lewis, producers	PBS
1992 (44th)	Hearts of Darkness: A Filmmaker's Apocalypse	Doug Claybourne and Fred Roos, executive producers; George Zaloom and Les Mayfield, producers	Showtime
1992 (44th)	In the Company of Whales	Tim Cowling, executive producer; Robin Brown, producer	Discovery
1993 (45th)	Outstanding Informational Series		
1993 (45th)	Healing and the Mind with Bill Moyers	David Grubin, executive producer; Bill Moyers, editorial producer/host; Alice Markowitz, producer; Judith Davidson Moyers, editorial producer	PBS
1993 (45th)	Cops	John Langley and Malcolm Barbour, executive producers; Murray Jordan, supervising producer; Bertram van Munster, producer; Karla Bair, co-producer	Fox
1993 (45th)	Entertainment Tonight	Jim Van Messel, executive producer; Barry Berk, senior producer; Linda Ellman, supervising producer; Bill Olson, Jim Ziegler and Steve Skinner, producers	Syndicated
1993 (45th)	Unsolved Mysteries	Terry Dunn Meurer and John Cosgrove, executive producers; Stuart Schwartz and Raymond Bridgers, supervising producers; Tim Rogan, coordinating producer	NBC
1993 (45th)	The Wild West	Douglas Netter, executive producer; John Copeland and Kieth Merrill, producer; Jamie Smith and Fabian Forte, co-producers	Syndicated
1993 (45th)	Outstanding Informational Special		
1993 (45th)	Lucy and Desi: A Home Movie	Lucie Arnaz and Laurence Luckinbill, executive producers; Don Buford, producer	NBC
1993 (45th)	The Barbara Walters Summer Special with Kathie Lee Gifford & Frank Gifford, Al Pacino, Jerry Seinfeld and Clint Eastwood	Bill Geddie, producer; Barbara Walters, host	ABC
1993 (45th)	D.W. Griffith: Father of Film (American Masters)	Susan Lacy and Ian Martin, executive producers; Kevin Brownlow and David Gill, producers	PBS
1993 (45th)	Katharine Hepburn: All About Me	Joan Kramer and David Heeley, producers; Katharine Hepburn, host	TNT
1993 (45th)	Michael Jackson Talks to... Oprah Live	Oprah Winfrey, executive producer; Debra Di Maio, producer; Wendy Roth, coordinating producer	ABC
1993 (45th)	Outstanding Individual Achievement - Informational Programming (Note: This program was nominated as Outstanding Individual Achievement - Informational Programming for its host. As a juried award, nominees had to garner 50% approval to win the award.)		
1993 (45th)	Gardens of the World: Flower Gardens	Audrey Hepburn, host	PBS
1994 (46th)	Outstanding Informational Series		
1994 (46th)	Later with Bob Costas	Lou Del Prete and Matthew McCarthy, executive producers; Fred Rothenberg and Bruce Cornblatt, senior producers; Michael Weinberg, producer; Bob Costas, host	NBC
1994 (46th)	Cooking with Master Chefs: Hosted by Julia Child	Geoffrey Drummond, Natan Katzman and John Potthast, executive producers; Susie Heller, coordinating producer; Julia Child, host	PBS
1994 (46th)	Cops	John Langley and Malcolm Barbour, executive producers; Murray Jordan, supervising producer; Bertram van Munster, producer; Karla Bair, co-producer	Fox
1994 (46th)	Entertainment Tonight	Jim Van Messel, executive producer; Bill Olson, Jim Ziegler and Kathryn McEachern, supervising producers; Barry Berk, senior producer	Syndicated
1994 (46th)	Siskel & Ebert	Larry Dieckhaus, executive producer; Don DuPree, supervising producer/director; Andrea Gronvall, producer; Gene Siskel and Roger Ebert, hosts	Syndicated
1994 (46th)	Outstanding Informational Special (Note: In 2020, the TV Academy rescinded a nomination in this category for the Disney Channel special George Stevens: D-Day to Berlin, produced by George Stevens Jr. The program was a re-edit of the 1985 BBC documentary D-Day to Berlin, in violation of a rule that "a program that is a foreign acquisition without benefit of a domestic co-production cannot be re-introduced into eligibility in a current awards year, even though it may have been modified with new footage, sound track, musical score, etc.")		
1994 (46th)	I Am a Promise: The Children of Stanton Elementary School (America Undercover)	Alan Raymond and Susan Raymond, producers	HBO
1994 (46th)	Audrey Hepburn Remembered	Gene Feldman and Suzette Winter, co-producers	PBS
1994 (46th)	The Barbara Walters Summer Special with Elton John, Meg Ryan and Steven Spielberg	Bill Geddie, producer; Barbara Walters, host	ABC
1994 (46th)	Leonard Bernstein: The Gift of Music (Great Performances)	Harry J. Kraut and Klaus Hallig, executive producers; Michael Bronson, producer; Elaine Warner, coordinating producer	PBS
1994 (46th)	Outstanding Individual Achievement - Informational Programming (Note: This program was nominated as Outstanding Individual Achievement - Informational Programming for its host. As a juried award, nominees had to garner 50% approval to win the award.)		
1994 (46th)	Are You What You Watch?	Linda Ellerbee, host	Nickelodeon
1995 (47th)	Outstanding Informational Series		
1995 (47th)	Baseball	Ken Burns, producer/director/writer; Lynn Novick, producer; Geoffrey C. Ward, writer; John Chancellor, narrator	PBS
1995 (47th)	TV Nation	Michael Moore, executive producer/director/writer/host; Jerry Kupfer, supervising producer; David Wald, senior producer; Kathleen Glynn, producer; Eric Zicklin, Steve Sherrill, Chris Kelly and Randy Cohen, writers	NBC
1995 (47th)	A Century of Women	Jacoba Atlas, executive producer/writer; Pat Mitchell, executive producer for TBS; Susan Krakower, supervising producer; Vivian Schiller, supervising producer for TBS; Carol Romo, coordinating producer; Lynne Tuite, producer: fiction; Kyra Thompson, producer/writer; Barbara Kopple, director: fictional family; Judy Korin, Chris Harty and Sylvia Morales, directors; Lynn Roth, co-producer/writer: fictional family; Heidi Schulman, writer; Jane Fonda, narrator	TBS
1995 (47th)	The Hermitage: A Russian Odyssey	Daniel Wilson, executive producer; John Baehrend, producer; Rod MacLeish, writer	Syndicated
1995 (47th)	The History of Rock 'n' Roll	Jeffrey Peisch, series producer; Andrew Solt, Robert B. Meyrowitz, David Salzman and Quincy Jones, executive producers; Ted Haimes, producer/director/writer; Greg Vines, co-producer; Marc Sachnoff, supervising producer; David Axlerod, line producer	WBN
1995 (47th)	Unsolved Mysteries	Terry Dunn Meurer and John Cosgrove, executive producers; Stuart Schwartz and Raymond Bridgers, supervising producers; Tim Rogan, coordinating producer; Joshua Alper, Glenn Kirschbaum and Lynn Lawrence, writers; Jim Lindsay, Mike Mathis and Robert M. Wise, directors; Robert Stack, host	NBC
1995 (47th)	Outstanding Informational Special		
1995 (47th)	One Survivor Remembers	Kary Antholis, producer; Sheila Nevins, senior producer; Michael Berenbaum and Raye Farr, co-producers	HBO
1995 (47th)	Taxicab Confessions	Sheila Nevins, executive producer; Joe Gantz and Harry Gantz, producers/directors	HBO
1995 (47th)	5 American Kids – 5 American Handguns (America Undercover)	Sheila Nevins, executive producer; Vince DiPersio and Bill Guttentag, producers/writers/directors; Beau Bridges, narrator	HBO
1995 (47th)	Hank Aaron: Chasing the Dream	Michael Tollin, executive producer/director/writer; Denzel Washington, Debra Martin Chase and Brian Robbins, executive producers; David Houle and Jack Myers, executive producers for TV Prod. Partners; Fredric Golding, producer; Dorian Harewood, narrator; Pat Mitchell, executive producer for TBS; Tom McMahon, supervising producer for TBS; Vivian Schiller, senior producer for TBS	TBS
1995 (47th)	Moon Shot	David Hoffman, executive producer; Kirk Wolfinger, director; Rushmore DeNooyer, producer: 3rd hour/chief writer; Dana Rae Warren, writer/producer: 1st hour; Aaron Fische and Dan Gordon-Levitt, producers: 2nd hour; Jim Ohm, producer: 3rd hour; Sarah Kerruish, writer/producer: 4th hour; Barry Corbin, narrator; Pat Mitchell and John Savage, executive producers for TBS; Vivian Schiller, supervising producer for TBS	TBS
1995 (47th)	30 Years of National Geographic Specials	Nicolas Noxon, executive producer; Gail Willumsen, producer/writer; Barry Nye, producer; Richard Kiley, narrator	NBC
1996 (48th)	Outstanding Informational Series		
1996 (48th)	Time Life's Lost Civilizations	Joel Westbrook, executive producer; Jason Williams, producer; Robert H. Gardner, producer/director/writer; William Morgan, coordinating producer; Ed Fields, writer; Sam Waterston, host	NBC
1996 (48th)	The Beatles Anthology	Neil Aspinall, executive producer; Chips Chipperfield, producer; Geoff Wonfor, director; Bob Smeaton, series director/writer	ABC
1996 (48th)	Biography	Josh Howard and Michael Cascio, executive producers; Michael Rosenbaum, senior producer; Randy Martin and Brooke Runnette, producers; Bill Harris, series producer/director; Diane Ferenczi, coordinating producer	A&E
1996 (48th)	The Private Life of Plants	Pat Mitchell, executive producer; Mike Salisbury, executive producer/producer; Vivian Schiller, senior producer; Neil Nightingale and Keith Scholey, producers; Neil Lucas, directors; David Attenborough, writer/host	TBS
1996 (48th)	TV Nation	Michael Moore. executive producer/director/writer; Kathleen Glynn, producer; Jerry Kupfer, supervising producer; Annie Cohen, John Derevlany, Francis Gasparini, Jay Martel, Jeff Stilson and Louis Theroux, writers	Fox
1996 (48th)	Outstanding Informational Special		
1996 (48th)	Survivors of the Holocaust	Pat Mitchell, executive producer; Vivian Schiller, senior producer; June Beallor and James Moll, producers; Jacoba Atlas, supervising producer; Allan Holzman, director	TBS
1996 (48th)	Andersonville Diaries	Kaye Zusmann, executive producer; Amy Walter Richards, producer/writer; Charlton Heston, narrator	TNT
1996 (48th)	The Battle Over Citizen Kane (American Experience)	Thomas Lennon and Michael Epstein, producers	PBS
1996 (48th)	The Celluloid Closet (America Undercover)	Howard Rosenman, Bernie Brillstein, Brad Grey and Sheila Nevins, executive producers; Lily Tomlin, co-executive producer/narrator; Rob Epstein and Jeffrey Friedman, producers/directors/writers; Michael Lumpkin, co-producer; Sharon Wood and Armistead Maupin, writers	HBO
1997 (49th)	Outstanding Informational Series		
1997 (49th)	Biography	Michael Cascio, executive producer; CarolAnne Dolan, supervising producer; Diane Ferenczi, coordinating producer; Peter Graves and Jack Perkins, hosts	A&E
1997 (49th)	The Great War and the Shaping of the 20th Century	Blaine Baggett, executive producer/writer; Jay Winter, co-producer/writer; Carl Byker, producer/director/writer	PBS
1997 (49th)	Discover Magazine	Suzy Geller-Wolf and David McKillop, executive producers; Evan Hadingham, executive producer/writer; Mark Etkind, producer/director/writer; Nancy Dubuc, coordinating producer; Dan Gordon-Levitt, co-producer; Peter DeMeo, host	Discovery
1997 (49th)	Inside the Actors Studio	James Lipton, executive producer/host; Michael Kostel, producer; Caroline Kaplan, series producer; Jeff Wurtz, director	Bravo
1997 (49th)	Siskel & Ebert	Larry Dieckhaus, executive producer; Andrea Gronvall, producer; Don DuPree, director; Gene Siskel and Roger Ebert, hosts	Syndicated
1997 (49th)	Outstanding Informational Special		
1997 (49th)	National Geographic Special: Tigers of the Snow	Nicolas Noxon, executive producer; Mark Stouffer, producer/director; Kevin McCarey, writer; Richard Kiley, narrator	NBC
1997 (49th)	Without Pity: A Film About Abilities	Sheila Nevins, executive producer; Michael Mierendorf, producer/director/writer; Jonathan Moss, coordinating producer; Christopher Reeve, narrator	HBO
1997 (49th)	Man Ray: Prophet of the Avant Garde (American Masters)	Susan Lacy, executive producer; Tamar Hacker, senior producer; Mel Stuart, producer/director; William T. Cartwright, co-producer; Neil Baldwin, writer	PBS
1997 (49th)	Paradise Lost: The Child Murders at Robin Hood Hills	Sheila Nevins, executive producer; Joe Berlinger and Bruce Sinofsky, producers/directors; Jonathan Moss, coordinating producer	HBO
1997 (49th)	Talked to Death	Sheila Nevins, executive producer; John Parsons Peditto, producer; Ellen Goosenberg Kent and Diane Rosenberg, co-producers; Nancy Abraham, associate producer; Eames Yates, director	HBO
1997 (49th)	Taxicab Confessions III	Sheila Nevins, executive producer; Joe Gantz and Harry Gantz, producers/directors	HBO

Between 1998 and 2012, informational series competed in Outstanding Nonfiction Series.

=== 2010s ===
Year	Program	Recipients	Network
2013 (65th)
2013 (65th)	Anthony Bourdain: Parts Unknown	Anthony Bourdain, Christopher Collins, Lydia Tenaglia and Sandra Zweig, executive producers; Nick Brigden, Michael Steed, Tom Vitale and Jared Andrukanis, producers	CNN
2013 (65th)	Inside the Actors Studio	James Lipton and Christian Barcellos, executive producers; Shawn Tesser and Jeff Wurtz, producers	Bravo
2013 (65th)	Brain Games	Jerry Kolber and Allan Butler, executive producers; Adam 'Tex' Davis and Isaac Holub, supervising producers; Jason Williams, producer; Jason Silva, host	Nat Geo
2013 (65th)	Oprah's Master Class	Justin Wilkes, Jon Kamen, Jon Sinclair and Oprah Winfrey, executive producers	OWN
2013 (65th)	Stand Up to Cancer	Joel Gallen and Gwyneth Paltrow, executive producers; Nikki Varhely-Gillingham and Rick Austin, supervising producers; Emily Wolfe, producer	ABC/CBS/NBC
2014 (66th)
2014 (66th)	Anthony Bourdain: Parts Unknown	Anthony Bourdain, Christopher Collins, Lydia Tenaglia and Sandra Zweig, executive producers; Nick Brigden, Michael Steed, Tom Vitale and Jared Andrukanis, producers	CNN
2014 (66th)	Vice	Bill Maher, Shane Smith, Eddy Moretti and Bradley J. Levin, executive producers; Jedd Thomas, senior producer; Jonah Kaplan, series producer	HBO
2014 (66th)	Inside the Actors Studio	James Lipton, executive producer; Shawn Tesser and Jeff Wurtz, producers	Bravo
2014 (66th)	Through the Wormhole	Producing Team	Science
2014 (66th)	The Writers' Room	Tom Forman, Brad Bishop, Mike Maloy and Neal Kendall, executive producers; Jim Rash, producer/host	Sundance
2015 (67th)
2015 (67th)	Anthony Bourdain: Parts Unknown	Anthony Bourdain, Christopher Collins, Lydia Tenaglia and Sandra Zweig, executive producers; Tom Vitale and Erik Osterholm, producers	CNN
2015 (67th)	Foo Fighters: Sonic Highways	James A. Rota, John Ramsay and Dave Grohl, executive producers; John Silva, Gaby Skolnek, John Cutcliffe and Kristen Welsh, produced by	HBO
2015 (67th)	Inside the Actors Studio	James Lipton, executive producer; Shawn Tesser and Jeff Wurtz, producers	Bravo
2015 (67th)	StarTalk with Neil deGrasse Tyson	Neil deGrasse Tyson, Helen Matsos, Brian Lovett and Michael Kovnat, executive producers; Drew Pulley, co-executive producer	Nat Geo
2015 (67th)	Vice	Bill Maher, Shane Smith, Eddy Moretti and Bradley J. Levin, executive producers; Jonah Kaplan, co-executive producer; Tim Clancy, supervising producer; Ben Anderson, senior producer	HBO
2016 (68th)
2016 (68th)	Anthony Bourdain: Parts Unknown	Anthony Bourdain, executive producer/host; Christopher Collins, Lydia Tenaglia and Sandra Zweig, executive producers; Toby Oppenheimer, Mike Steed and Tom Vitale, producers	CNN
2016 (68th)	Inside the Actors Studio	James Lipton, executive producer/host; Shawn E. Tesser and Jeff Wurtz, producers	Bravo
2016 (68th)	StarTalk with Neil deGrasse Tyson	Neil deGrasse Tyson, executive producer/host; Helen Matsos, Brian Lovett and Michael Kovnat, executive producers; Drew Pulley, co-executive producer	Nat Geo
2016 (68th)	The Story of God with Morgan Freeman	Morgan Freeman, executive producer/host; James Younger, Lori McCreary, Michael J. Miller and Simon Andreae, executive producers; Scott Tiffany, supervising producer; Frank Kosa, producer	Nat Geo
2016 (68th)	Vice	Shane Smith, Eddy Moretti, Bradley J. Levin and Bill Maher, executive producers; Jonah Kaplan, co-executive producer; Tim Clancy, supervising producer; Ben Anderson, produced by	HBO
2017 (69th)
2017 (69th)	Leah Remini: Scientology and the Aftermath (Season 1)	Eli Holzman, Aaron Saidman, Leah Remini, Alex Weresow and Devon Graham Hammonds, executive producers; Erin Gamble and Rachelle Mendez, co-executive producers; Jeana Dill, supervising producer	A&E
2017 (69th)	Anthony Bourdain: Parts Unknown	Anthony Bourdain, Christopher Collins, Lydia Tenaglia and Sandra Zweig, executive producers; Tom Vitale and Jeffrey D. Allen, producers	CNN
2017 (69th)	Inside the Actors Studio	James Lipton, executive producer; Shawn E. Tesser and Jeff Wurtz, producers	Bravo
2017 (69th)	StarTalk with Neil deGrasse Tyson	Neil deGrasse Tyson, executive producer/host; Helen Matsos, Brian Lovett, Drew Pulley and Michael J. Miller, executive producers	Nat Geo
2017 (69th)	Vice	Shane Smith, Jonah Kaplan, Tim Clancy and Bill Maher, executive producers; Beverly Chase and David Schankula, supervising producers; Ben Anderson, senior producer	HBO
2018 (70th)
2018 (70th)	Anthony Bourdain: Parts Unknown	Anthony Bourdain, Christopher Collins, Lydia Tenaglia and Sandra Zweig, executive producers; Morgan Fallon, producer	CNN
2018 (70th)	Leah Remini: Scientology and the Aftermath	Eli Holzman, Aaron Saidman, Leah Remini, Devon Graham Hammonds, Myles Reiff, Elaine Frontain Bryant and Amy Savitsky, executive producers	A&E
2018 (70th)	My Next Guest Needs No Introduction with David Letterman	Justin Wilkes, Dave Sirulnick, Jon Kamen and Tom Keaney, executive producers; Louise Shelton, supervising producer; Aaron Bergeron, series producer; Mary Barclay, producer	Netflix
2018 (70th)	StarTalk with Neil deGrasse Tyson	Neil deGrasse Tyson, executive producer/host; Helen Matsos, Brian Lovett, Drew Pulley and Betsy Forhan, executive producers	Nat Geo
2018 (70th)	Vice	Shane Smith, Jonah Kaplan, Tim Clancy, Bill Maher and Michael Kenneth Williams, executive producers; Beverly Chase and David Schankula, supervising producers; Ben Anderson, senior producer	HBO
2019 (71st)
2019 (71st)	Anthony Bourdain: Parts Unknown	Anthony Bourdain, Christopher Collins, Lydia Tenaglia and Sandra Zweig, executive producers; Jared Andrukanis, co-executive producer; Michael Steed and Jonathan Cianfrani, producers	CNN
2019 (71st)	Comedians in Cars Getting Coffee	Jerry Seinfeld, George Shapiro and Tammy Johnston, executive producers; Melissa Miller, producer	Netflix
2019 (71st)	Leah Remini: Scientology and the Aftermath	Leah Remini, Eli Holzman, Aaron Saidman and Myles Reiff, executive producers; Mike Rinder, Meaghan Rady and Kai Bowe, co-executive producers	A&E
2019 (71st)	My Next Guest Needs No Introduction with David Letterman	Chris Cechin-De La Rosa, Lydia Tenaglia, Tom Keaney, Sandra Zweig and Mary Barclay, executive producers; Michael Steed and Helen Cho, producers	Netflix
2019 (71st)	Surviving R. Kelly	Joel Karsberg, dream hampton, Tamra Simmons, Jesse Daniels and Brie Miranda Bryant, executive producers; Jessica Everleth and Maria Pepin, co-executive producers	Lifetime

=== 2020s ===
Year	Program	Recipients	Network
2020 (72nd)
2020 (72nd)	Leah Remini: Scientology and the Aftermath (Waiting for Justice)	Leah Remini, executive producer/host; Eli Holzman, Aaron Saidman, Ray Dotch and Devon Graham Hammonds, executive producers; Chris Rowe and Mike Rinder, co-executive producers	A&E
2020 (72nd)	Comedians in Cars Getting Coffee (Season 11)	Jerry Seinfeld, executive producer/host; Tammy Johnston and George Shapiro, executive producers; Denis Jensen, producer	Netflix
2020 (72nd)	Ugly Delicious (Season 2)	David Chang, executive producer/host; Morgan Neville, Dara Horenblas, Christopher Chen and Caryn Capotosto, executive producers; Blake Davis and Chris Ying, co-executive producers	Netflix
2020 (72nd)	Vice	Beverly Chase and Subrata De, executive producers; Craig Thomson, co-executive producer; Greg Wright, supervising producer	Showtime
2020 (72nd)	The World According to Jeff Goldblum (Season 1)	Jeff Goldblum, executive producer/host; Jane Root, Peter Lovering, Keith Addis and Matt Renner, executive producers; Arif Nurmohamed, co-executive producer; John Hodgson, series producer	Disney+
2021 (73rd)
2021 (73rd)	Stanley Tucci: Searching for Italy (Season 1)	Stanley Tucci, executive producer/host; Adam Hawkins, Eve Kay, Amy Entelis and Lyle Gamm, executive producers; Jon Adler and Molly Harrington, supervising producers	CNN
2021 (73rd)	My Next Guest Needs No Introduction with David Letterman (Season 3)	Tom Keaney, Mary Barclay, Chris Cechin-De La Rosa and Alexandra Lowry, executive producers; Helen Cho and Michael Steed, producers	Netflix
2021 (73rd)	Oprah with Meghan and Harry: A CBS Primetime Special	Tara Montgomery and Terry Wood, executive producers; Brian Piotrowicz and Brad Pavone, co-executive producers; Corinne Gilliard, Amanda Cash and Colleen Dunnegan, senior producers	CBS
2021 (73rd)	United Shades of America with W. Kamau Bell	W. Kamau Bell, executive producer/host; Lydia Tenaglia, Morgan Fallon and Sandra Zweig, executive producers; Raza Naqvi and Jane Jo, producers; Dwayne Kennedy, supervising producer	CNN
2021 (73rd)	Vice	Beverly Chase and Subrata De, executive producers; Craig Thomson, co-executive producer; Robert Booth, Paula Salhany, Greg Wright and Amanda Pisetzner, supervising producers	Showtime
2022 (74th)
2022 (74th)	Stanley Tucci: Searching for Italy (Season 2 Part 1)	Stanley Tucci, executive producer/host; Tom Barry, Eve Kay, Adam Hawkins, Amy Entelis, Lyle Gamm and Jon Adler, executive producers	CNN
2022 (74th)	My Next Guest Needs No Introduction with David Letterman (Season 4)	Tom Keaney, Mary Barclay, Michael Steed, John Skidmore, Tony Hernandez, Brooke Posch, Lilly Burns and Justin Wilkes, executive producers	Netflix
2022 (74th)	The Problem with Jon Stewart (Season 1)	Jon Stewart, executive producer/host; Brinda Adhikari, James Dixon and Richard Plepler, executive producers; Chris McShane, co-executive producer; Lorrie Baranek, supervising producer; Caity Gray, producer	Apple TV+
2022 (74th)	Vice	Beverly Chase and Subrata De, executive producers; Craig Thomson, co-executive producer; Robert Booth, Paula Salhany and Amanda Pisetzner, supervising producers; Lama Al-Arian and Simone Perez, producers; Hind Hassan and Paola Ramos, hosts	Showtime
2022 (74th)	The World According to Jeff Goldblum (Season 2)	Jeff Goldblum, executive producer/host; Jane Root, Sara Brailsford, Keith Addis, Matt Renner and Chris Kugelman, executive producers; John Hodgson, co-executive producer	Disney+
2023 (75th)
2023 (75th)	Stanley Tucci: Searching for Italy (Season 2 Part 2)	Stanley Tucci, executive producer/host; Shauna Minoprio, Robin O'Sullivan, Amy Entelis, Lyle Gamm and Jon Adler, executive producers; Katie Isaacson, supervising producer; Fiona Cleary and Nadya Mahdi, series producers; Francesco Ficarra, producer	CNN
2023 (75th)	The Light We Carry: Michelle Obama and Oprah Winfrey	Michelle Obama, Jesse Collins and Dionne Harmon, executive producers; Tanisha Whitfield, supervising producer; Tonia Davis and Ethan Lewis, produced by; Oprah Winfrey, host	Netflix
2023 (75th)	My Next Guest Needs No Introduction with David Letterman and Volodymyr Zelenskyy	Tom Keaney, Mary Barclay, John Skidmore, Justin Wilkes and Michael Steed, executive producers; Razan Ghalayini, co-executive producer; Tommy Alter, producer	Netflix
2023 (75th)	Taste the Nation with Padma Lakshmi (Season 2)	Padma Lakshmi, executive producer/host; David Shadrack Smith and Rachel Tung, executive producers; Lauren Budabin, co-executive producer; Matthew Alvarez, producer	Hulu
2023 (75th)	United Shades of America with W. Kamau Bell (Season 7)	W. Kamau Bell, executive producer/host; Christopher Collins, Lydia Tenaglia, Sandra Zweig, Morgan Fallon, Amy Entelis and Lyle Gamm, executive producers; Dwayne Kennedy, supervising producer; Crystal Isaac and Andrew Ford, producers	CNN
2024 (76th)
2024 (76th)	My Next Guest with David Letterman and John Mulaney	Tom Keaney, Mary Barclay, Michael Steed, Séamus Murphy-Mitchell, Justin Wilkes and Jake Fuller, executive producers; Tommy Alter, producer	Netflix
2024 (76th)	Conan O'Brien Must Go (Season 1)	Conan O'Brien, executive producer/host; Jeff Ross, executive producer; Aaron Bleyaert and Jordan Schlansky, supervising producers; Jason Chillemi, Sarah Federowicz, Jessie Gaskell, Matt O'Brien and Mike Sweeney, producers; Njål Lambrechts, line producer	Max
2024 (76th)	Finding Your Roots with Henry Louis Gates Jr. (Season 10)	John F. Wilson, Dyllan McGee, Henry Louis Gates Jr. and Peter Kunhardt, executive producers; Deborah C Porfido, supervising producer; Sabin Streeter, senior producer; Natalia Warchol, series producer; Kevin Burke and Matthew Cesario, producers; Robert L. Yacyshyn, line producer	PBS
2024 (76th)	How To with John Wilson (Season 3)	John Wilson, executive producer/host; Nathan Fielder, Michael Koman and Clark Reinking, executive producers; Shirel Kozak, produced by	HBO
2024 (76th)	The Reluctant Traveler with Eugene Levy (Season 2)	Eugene Levy, host/executive producer; David Brindley, Nic Patten, Sara Brailsford and Alex Menzies, executive producers; Stephen Pain, series producer; Tracey Smyth, senior producer; Claire Kunzel, producer	Apple TV+
2025 (77th)
2025 (77th)	Conan O'Brien Must Go (Season 2)	Conan O'Brien, executive producer/host; Jeff Ross, executive producer; Aaron Bleyaert and Jordan Schlansky, supervising producers; José Arroyo, Jason Chillemi, Sarah Federowicz, Jessie Gaskell and Mike Sweeney, producers; Matthew Shaw, series producer	HBO Max
2025 (77th)	The Daily Show Presents: Jordan Klepper Fingers the Pulse: MAGA: The Next Generation	Jordan Klepper, executive producer/host; Ian Berger and Jen Flanz, executive producers; Zhubin Parang, co-executive producer; Sushil Dayal, supervising producer; Abby Arora and Jessie Kanevsky, producers	Comedy Central
2025 (77th)	Finding Your Roots with Henry Louis Gates Jr. (Season 11)	Henry Louis Gates Jr., executive producer/host; Dyllan McGee and Peter Kunhardt, executive producers; Deborah Porfido, supervising producer; Sabin Streeter, senior producer; Natalia Warchol, series producer; Robert Yacyshyn, line producer; Kevin Burke and CeCe Moore, producers	PBS
2025 (77th)	My Next Guest Needs No Introduction with David Letterman (Season 5)	Tom Keaney, Mary Barclay, Michael Steed, Séamus Murphy-Mitchell, Justin Wilkes and Jake Fuller, executive producers; Halavah Sofsky, line producer; Tommy Alter, John Nemeth and Isabel Richardson, producers	Netflix
2025 (77th)	Tucci in Italy (Season 1)	Stanley Tucci, executive producer/host; Lottie Birmingham, Amanda Lyon and Simon Raikes, executive producers; Ben Jessop, co-executive producer; Mandy Weller and Stephanie Stoltzfus, line producers; Francesco Ficarra and Yari Lorenzo, producers	Nat Geo
2026 (78th)
2026 (78th)	Tucci in Italy (Season 2)	Stanley Tucci, executive producer/host; Lottie Birmingham, Amanda Lyon and Simon Raikes, executive producers; Ben Jessop, co-executive producer; Alana Moreno and Yari Lorenzo, senior producers; Stephanie Stoltzfus and Mandy Weller, line producers; Francesco Ficarra, producer	Nat Geo
2026 (78th)	The Daily Show Presents: Jordan Klepper Fingers the Pulse: Give the Man a Prize	Jordan Klepper, executive producer/host; Ian Berger and Jen Flanz, executive producers; Zhubin Parang, co-executive producer; Sushil Dayal, supervising producer; Abby Arora and Jessie Kanevsky, producers	Comedy Central
2026 (78th)	Finding Your Roots with Henry Louis Gates Jr. (Season 12)	Henry Louis Gates Jr., executive producer/host; Dyllan McGee and Peter Kunhardt, executive producers; Sabin Streeter, senior producer; Natalia Warchol, series producer; Deborah Clancy Porfido, Robert L. Yacyshyn and Sam Hartley, supervising producers; Kevin Burke, producer	PBS
2026 (78th)	My Next Guest Needs No Introduction with David Letterman (Season 6)	Tom Keaney, Mary Barclay, Michael Steed, Justin Wilkes, Isabel Richardson and Yolanda T. Cochran, executive producers; Adam Donnelly, line producer; Tommy Alter, John Nemeth and Hunter Speese, producers	Netflix
2026 (78th)	The Reluctant Traveler with Eugene Levy (Season 3)	Eugene Levy, executive producer/host; David Brindley, Nic Patten, Lily Fitzpatrick, Iain Peckham and Sara Brailsford, executive producers; Amy Browning, line producer; Kate McLernon-Billows, producer	Apple TV

== Programs with multiple wins ==
6 wins

- Anthony Bourdain: Parts Unknown

3 wins

- Stanley Tucci: Searching for Italy

2 wins

- Leah Remini: Scientology and the Aftermath
- Nature
- Smithsonian World

== Programs with multiple nominations ==
Totals are for nominees since 2013 and include nominations for Outstanding Documentary or Nonfiction Series and Outstanding Unstructured Reality Program.

18 nominations

- Inside the Actors Studio

9 nominations

- Vice

7 nominations

- Anthony Bourdain: Parts Unknown
- My Next Guest Needs No Introduction with David Letterman

6 nominations

- United Shades of America with W. Kamau Bell

4 nominations

- Leah Remini: Scientology and the Aftermath
- StarTalk with Neil deGrasse Tyson

3 nominations

- Stanley Tucci: Searching for Italy

2 nominations

- Comedians in Cars Getting Coffee
- Conan O'Brien Must Go
- The Daily Show Presents: Jordan Klepper Fingers the Pulse
- Finding Your Roots with Henry Louis Gates Jr.
- The Reluctant Traveler with Eugene Levy
- Tucci in Italy
- The World According to Jeff Goldblum
