= Cooking with Master Chefs: Hosted by Julia Child =

Cooking with Master Chefs was a PBS television cooking show that featured Julia Child visiting 16 celebrated chefs in the United States. An episode that featured Lidia Bastianich was nominated for a 1994 Emmy Award. Other chefs she visited included Emeril Lagasse, Jacques Pépin, and Alice Waters. The show featured a companion book of the same name, published in 1993 (ISBN 0-679-74829-6). Reruns of the show currently air on WUCF-TV.

== Episodes ==
No. overall	No. in season	Title	Original release date
1	1	"Emeril Lagasse"	October 2, 1993
In New Orleans, chef Emeril Lagasse prepares shrimp étouffée and a crab and crawfish boil.
2	2	"Michel Richard"	October 9, 1993
At his home kitchen in Los Angeles, Michel Richard of Citrus Restaurant prepares a chocolate dome cake and hot chocolate truffles.
3	3	"Patrick Clark"	October 16, 1993
Clark, who ran the kitchen in Washington, DC's esteemed Hay-Adams Hotel for many years, prepares seared peppered salmon roulade with gazpacho sauce and horseradish-crusted grouper.
4	4	"Lidia Bastianich"	October 23, 1993
In her home kitchen in Queens, Lidia Bastianich—chef and co-owner of Felidia in New York City—prepares risotto with wild mushrooms and orecchiette (little ears) pasta with broccoli di rape and sweet sausage.
5	5	"Charles Palmer"	October 30, 1993
From his home kitchen, New York chef Charles Palmer shares his expertise with wild game and prepares pepper-seared venison steaks with pinot noir and sun-dried cherries, herb potato maximes, and a warm chocolate tarragon cake.
6	6	"Amy Ferguson-Ota"	November 6, 1993
From her home kitchen in Hawaii, Amy Ferguson-Ota—the first female executive chef at the Ritz-Carlton Hotel in Hawaii—prepares a green papaya salad with Thai vinaigrette, wok-seared ono (fish) served with a banana curry, and a steamed-banana side dish.
7	7	"Robert Del Grande"	November 13, 1993
Robert Del Grande of Houston's Café Annie demonstrates his unique ability to combine complementary flavors as he prepares sea scallops with wild mushrooms in green sauce, with a side of fresh corn pudding, and filets of beef in a special pasilla chile sauce.
8	8	"Jean-Louis Palladin"	November 20, 1993
Jean-Louis Palladin—who ran his own restaurant in the Watergate Hotel for nearly 20 years—prepares foie gras (duck liver) with poached apples, roasts a duck breast over an open fireplace, and sautees porcini mushrooms.
9	9	"Susan Feniger and Mary Sue Milliken"	November 27, 1993
Susan Feniger and Mary Sue Milliken—chefs of L.A.'s famed Border Grill—prepare an eclectic selection of dishes, including Thai melon salad, spinach and eggplant curry, and curried popcorn.
10	10	"Jacques Pépin and Julia Child"	December 4, 1993
Jacques Pépin, a master chef and fellow teacher of French cuisine, joins Julia to prepare a lobster soufflé.
11	11	"Jeremiah Tower"	December 11, 1993
Chef and restaurateur Jeremiah Tower of Stars in San Francisco prepares grilled young chicken marinated in fresh herbs, served with a warm vegetable salad; poached chicken stuffed with mushrooms and smoked bacon with aromatic vegetables; and a casserole of roasted chicken salad with lemon, rosemary, and garlic.
12	12	"Jan Birnbaum and Lidia Bastianich"	December 18, 1993
Jan Birnbaum, who runs a Cajun-inspired restaurant called Catahoula, cooks smoked salmon and scrambled egg torte with caviar at his home in the Napa Valley. Then Lidia Bastianich prepares capellini pasta with a seafood and tomato sauce.
13	13	"André Soltner"	December 25, 1993
For 33 years, André Soltner was at the helm of the unrivaled New York City restaurant Lutèce. In this segment, taped in 1993, he prepares tarte flambée, Alsatian meat stew, and a classic tarte citron.
14	14	"Nancy Silverton"	January 1, 1994
Nancy Silverton owns and operates La Brea Bakery, considered one of the most innovative bakeries in the country. From her kitchen at home in Los Angeles, she prepares a sourdough starter, which is then used to make a loaf of rustic bread, a focaccia pizza dough, and an olive bread.
15	15	"Jacques Pépin"	January 8, 1994
From his Connecticut home kitchen, Jacques Pépin prepares braised sweetbreads in puff pastry with a black truffle and Madeira sauce.
16	16	"Alice Waters"	January 15, 1994
Waters, owner and chef of the renowned Chez Panisse in Berkeley, CA, prepares a shaved fennel, mushroom, and parmesan salad; green olive tapenade; a beet, blood orange, walnut, and arugula salad; and an appetizer of prosciutto with warm, wilted greens.
