= Tommy Alter =

American television producer and sports podcaster

- Occupations: Television producer, podcaster
- Notable credit(s): Desus & Mero; The Shop; The Old Man and the Three
- Father: Jonathan Alter

Tommy Alter is an American television producer and sports podcaster. With various media credits to his name, he is perhaps best known for being former National Basketball Association (NBA) player JJ Redick's co-host on multiple podcasts.

== Life and career ==
The son of author, columnist, and journalist Jonathan Alter, Tommy Alter has been a producer for television talk shows including The Shop, Desus & Mero, and My Next Guest Needs No Introduction with David Letterman.

Later, he suggested to then active NBA player JJ Redick to host a podcast for The Ringer. Redick would indeed begin hosting an eponymous podcast for the website, with Alter joining as Redick's co-host for its third season. In August 2020, the two founded their own production company, ThreeFourTwo Productions, so they could own their own media content. Alter and Redick launched another podcast through ThreeFourTwo, dubbed The Old Man and the Three. The podcast has featured NBA players on as guests.
