= JJ Redick =

American basketball coach (born 1984)

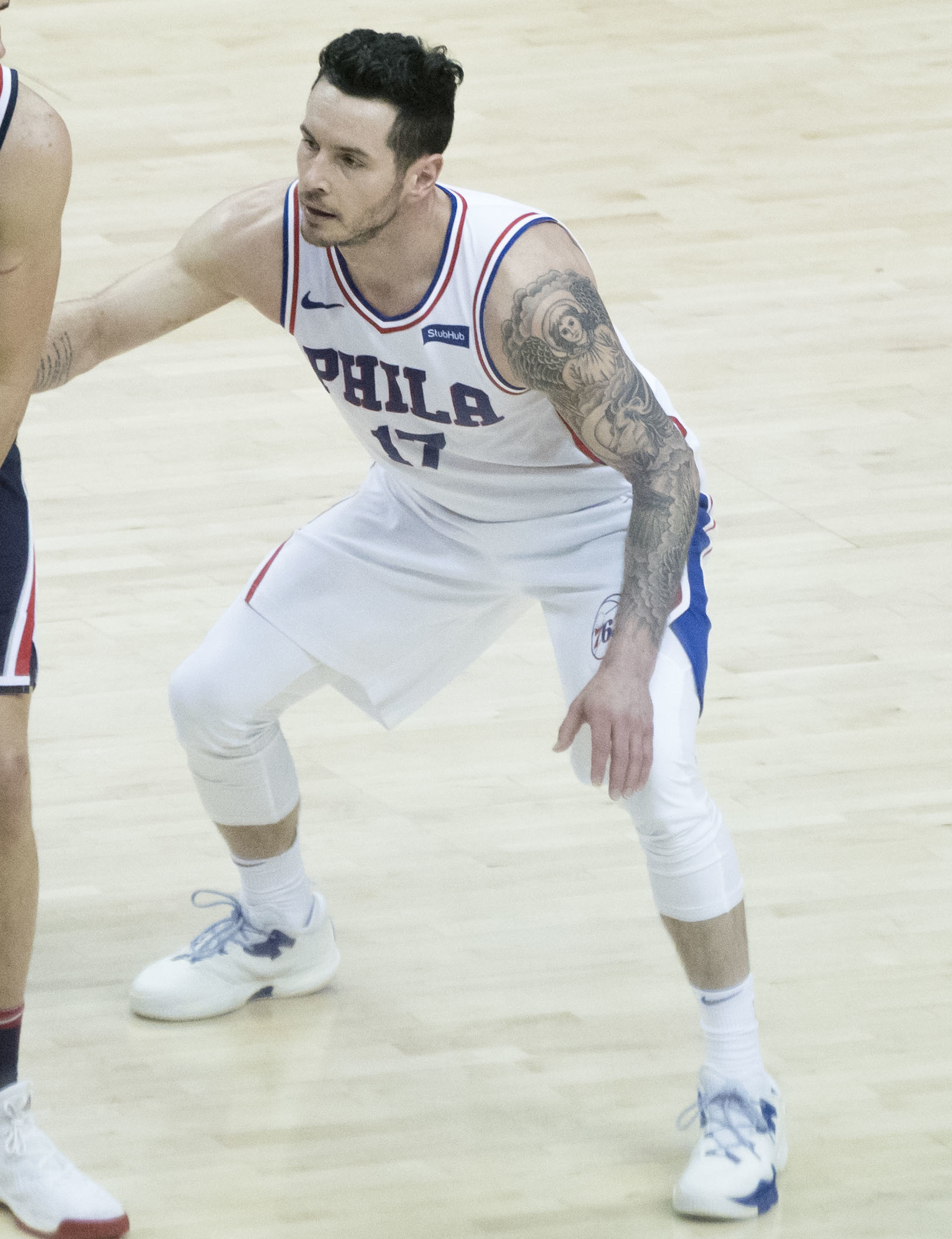
- Redick with the Philadelphia 76ers in 2018

Los Angeles Lakers
- Title: Head coach
- League: NBA

Personal information
- Born: June 24, 1984 (age 42) Cookeville, Tennessee, U.S.
- Listed height: 6 ft 4 in (1.93 m)
- Listed weight: 200 lb (91 kg)

Career information
- High school: Cave Spring (Roanoke, Virginia)
- College: Duke (2002–2006)
- NBA draft: 2006: 1st round, 11th overall pick
- Drafted by: Orlando Magic
- Playing career: 2006–2021
- Position: Shooting guard
- Number: 7, 5, 4, 17
- Coaching career: 2024–present

Career history

Playing
- 2006–2013: Orlando Magic
- 2013: Milwaukee Bucks
- 2013–2017: Los Angeles Clippers
- 2017–2019: Philadelphia 76ers
- 2019–2021: New Orleans Pelicans
- 2021: Dallas Mavericks

Career highlights
- As player: National college player of the year (2006); 2× Rupp Trophy (2005, 2006); James E. Sullivan Award (2005); 2× Consensus first-team All-American (2005, 2006); Third-team All-American – NABC (2004); ACC Athlete of the Year (2006); 2× ACC Player of the Year (2005, 2006); 2× First-team All-ACC (2005, 2006); Second-team All-ACC (2004); Third-team All-ACC (2003); 2× ACC tournament MVP (2005, 2006); No. 4 retired by Duke Blue Devils; McDonald's All-American Game MVP (2002); Second-team Parade All-American (2002); Virginia Mr. Basketball (2002)

Career statistics
- Points: 12,028 (12.8 ppg)
- Rebounds: 1,903 (2.0 rpg)
- Assists: 1,862 (2.0 apg)
- Stats at NBA.com
- Stats at Basketball Reference

Jonathan Clay "JJ" Redick (/ˈrɛdɪk/ RED-ik) (born June 24, 1984) is an American professional basketball coach and former player who is the head coach of the Los Angeles Lakers of the National Basketball Association (NBA). He played college basketball for the Duke Blue Devils, winning many individual awards, including the Naismith College Player of the Year. Selected 11th overall by the Orlando Magic in the 2006 NBA draft, he played for 15 seasons in the NBA with six teams. In 2024, Redick was appointed head coach of the Lakers.

In college and his professional career, Redick was known for his excellent three-point and free-throw shooting. He set Atlantic Coast Conference (ACC) career records for most points and most ACC tournament points. Redick set several records at Duke, including all-time leading scorer and most points in a season. He holds a few NCAA free-throw-percentage records and several ACC records.

After being drafted by the Magic, he played for seven seasons in Orlando, followed by a short spell with the Milwaukee Bucks, then four seasons with the Los Angeles Clippers. He signed a one-year contract with the Philadelphia 76ers in 2017, and another the following year. In 2019, Redick signed a two-year deal with the New Orleans Pelicans. He was traded to the Dallas Mavericks in 2021. After 15 seasons in the NBA, Redick retired on September 21, 2021. Redick holds single-season three-point field goal records for several of the teams he played for.

In 2016, Redick became the first active NBA player and the second active professional athlete to start a weekly podcast during the regular season. He later co-founded the media company ThreeFourTwo Productions. He was also hired as an analyst for ESPN before becoming a coach.

== High school career ==
Redick was a McDonald's All-American at Cave Spring High School in Roanoke, Virginia, winning the 2002 McDonald's All-American Game MVP. He scored 43 points as a senior in the Virginia High School League (VHSL) (Note: The VHSL membership is restricted to public schools. Virginia private schools are governed by separate bodies; while they compete against VHSL members in the regular season, they cannot compete for VHSL championships.) Class AAA state championship game, a game in which the Knights defeated George Wythe High School of Richmond. Redick's total was a VHSL championship-game record for all classes, standing until Mac McClung scored 47 for Gate City High School in the 2018 Class 2A final. Redick played Amateur Athletic Union (AAU) basketball for coach Delmar Irving with the Roanoke Jaguars and then the Boo Williams team, playing against Dwyane Wade in a July 1999 tournament in Orlando.

Considered a five-star recruit by Scout.com, Redick was highly recruited and listed as the No. 2 shooting guard and the No. 13 player in the nation in 2002.

== College career ==
In his first year at Duke University, Redick led his team with 30 points in their victory over NC State in the ACC Tournament championship game. He put up 26 points against Central Michigan in the second round of the NCAA tournament. However, he struggled in Duke's Sweet Sixteen loss to Kansas, hitting only two of 16 shots.

Redick served as co-captain in his junior year, along with senior point guard Daniel Ewing. He also served as captain his senior year, along with fellow seniors Shelden Williams, Sean Dockery and Lee Melchionni.

In the 2004–05 season, Redick led Duke in scoring with 21.8 points per game. He won the ACC Player of the Year award, and the Adolph F. Rupp Trophy for national player of the year. Redick's victory in the Rupp voting spoiled the consensus for Utah's Andrew Bogut, who won every other major player of the year award. In 2006, after facing close competition all year from Gonzaga's Adam Morrison, Redick won the major player of the year awards.

Redick set an ACC record for consecutive free throws with 54. This record began on March 20, 2003, and ended on January 15, 2004. It was broken on January 22, 2012, by Scott Wood from NC State. Redick entered his final postseason with a chance to go down as the NCAA's all-time leading free-throw shooter. The record, 91.3% (minimum 300 made and 2.5/game), was held at the time by Gary Buchanan of Villanova. In an otherwise triumphant visit to Greensboro Coliseum for the 2006 ACC tournament and early NCAA tournament games, Redick struggled at the line, lowering his career free-throw percentage by about 0.5% and finishing his career with 91.16% (660 out of 724).

On February 14, 2006, in the first half of a game against Wake Forest, Redick broke Virginia alumnus and fellow Roanoke native Curtis Staples's NCAA record of 413 career three-pointers made. Keydren Clark of Saint Peter's College subsequently surpassed Redick's mark in the MAAC tournament. However, Redick returned the favor by hitting 15 three-pointers in the ACC Tournament and 12 in the NCAA Tournament to finish ahead of Clark. Redick finished his career with an NCAA-record 457 three-point field goals shooting 40.4% from three-point range. His career three-pointers record was broken on February 2, 2014, by Oakland University's Travis Bader.

In the game after breaking Staples' record, Redick scored 30 points on February 19, 2006, against Miami to become the all-time leading scorer at Duke, with 2,557 points scored in his career. On February 25, in a game versus Temple, Redick passed Dickie Hemric's 51-year-old ACC scoring record of 2,587 points with a pair of free throws in the waning minutes of the game. His record was topped in one of the opening round games of the 2009 NCAA tournament by North Carolina's Tyler Hansbrough. Redick finished his career with 2,769 points.

On March 10, 2006, in an ACC Tournament quarterfinal against Miami, Redick scored 25 points, setting a Duke record for points in a season with 858. Redick ended the season with 964 points. Redick came up just short of the ACC record for points scored in a season, which was set by Dennis Scott with 970 points in 1990. Redick also finished his career as the leading scorer in ACC tournament history. His total of 225 points eclipsed Wake Forest's Len Chappell, who scored 220 points in the tournament from 1960 to 1962.

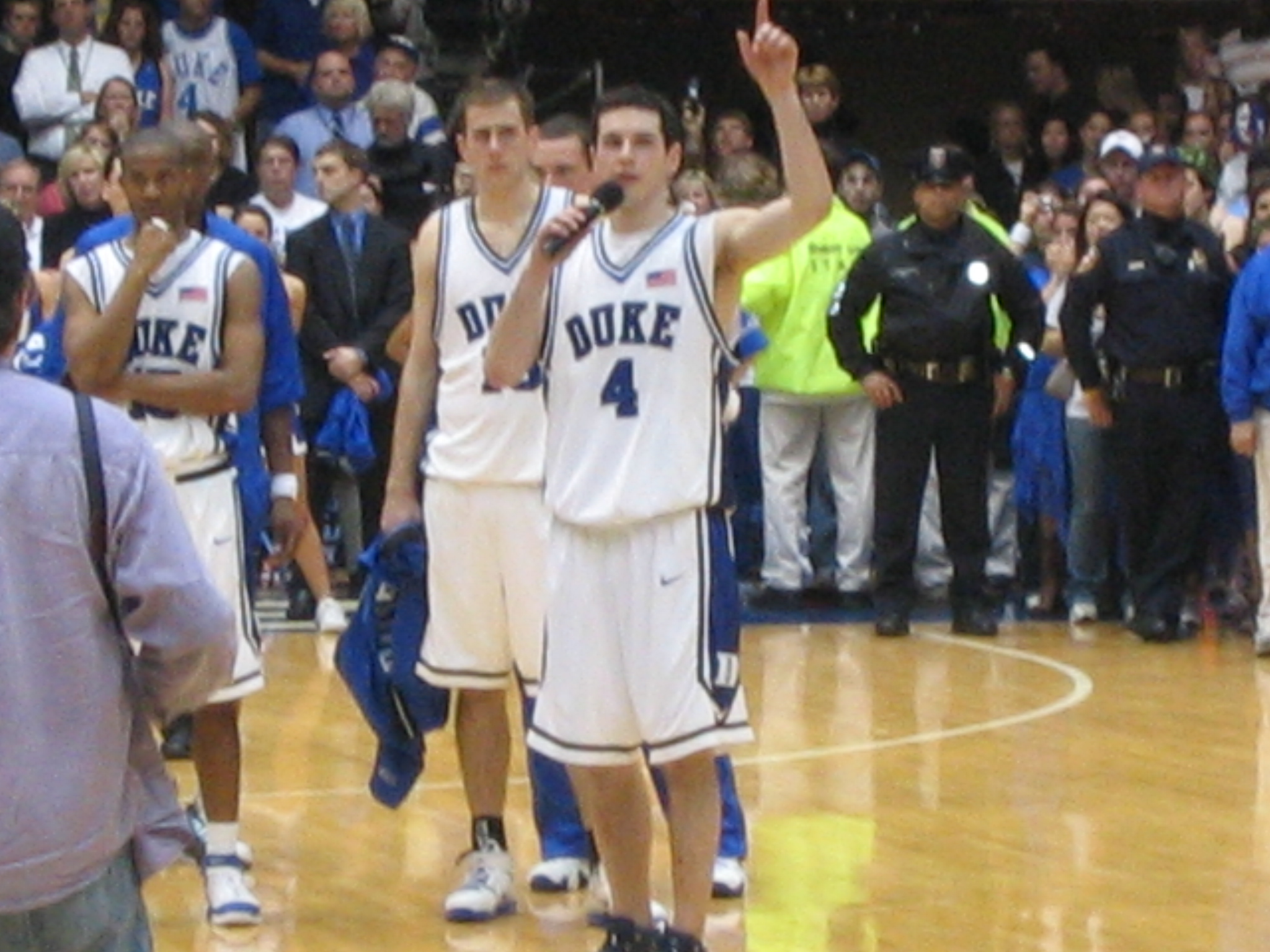
Redick speaking to the crowd after his final game at Cameron Indoor Stadium

As the marquee player of the Blue Devils, Redick was the target of abuse by fans of rival teams. In 2006, Clay Travis of CBS Sports called him the "most hated current athlete in America." After students from rivals Maryland and North Carolina discovered his cell phone number, Redick estimated that he received 50 to 75 hate calls per day. Opposing crowds would shout obscenity-laced tirades, yelling at him that "they had sex with his little sister" and "your little brother is gay". The abuse nearly led him to quit basketball in his sophomore year. He turned to writing poetry as an outlet.

He had 36 double-figure scoring games in a single season, tied as of March 28, 2010, for 5th-most in Duke history with Jon Scheyer, Shane Battier, and Jason Williams.

Redick was the cover athlete and official spokesman for College Hoops 2K7, released on Xbox, Xbox 360 & PlayStation 2 in 2006 and PlayStation 3 in 2007.

On February 4, 2007, Duke retired Redick's no. 4 jersey at Cameron Indoor Stadium in a halftime ceremony, the 13th player so honored.

As of the 2022–23 edition of the NCAA Record book, Redick held two NCAA records (career FT%, min 600 attempts – 91.2%; Sophomore season FT%, 95.3%) and was listed in nine other categories among their all-time leaders.

== Professional career ==
=== Orlando Magic (2006–2013) ===
Redick was selected with the 11th pick in the 2006 NBA draft by the Orlando Magic. Pre-draft scouting reports praised Redick's perimeter shooting and basketball intelligence, but questioned his defensive ability and speculated that he might not be tall or athletic enough to create his own shots in the NBA. This scouting report was highlighted when Duke played LSU in the 2006 NCAA tournament. LSU's Garrett Temple, a 6'5" guard known for his athleticism and a large wingspan, chased Redick throughout the game. Taken out of his normal rhythm, Redick—the number two scorer in the nation at the time—had one of the worst shooting performances of his college career, shooting 3-for-18 from the field and scoring 11 points in a Duke loss.

In a 2005 interview with the Charlotte Observer, Redick said, "I think I'll be a role player like 80 percent of the players in the league are. I don't expect to be a star, I'll just shoot, be a team player." He moved up into the backup shooting guard position behind well-known veteran and Duke alum Grant Hill.

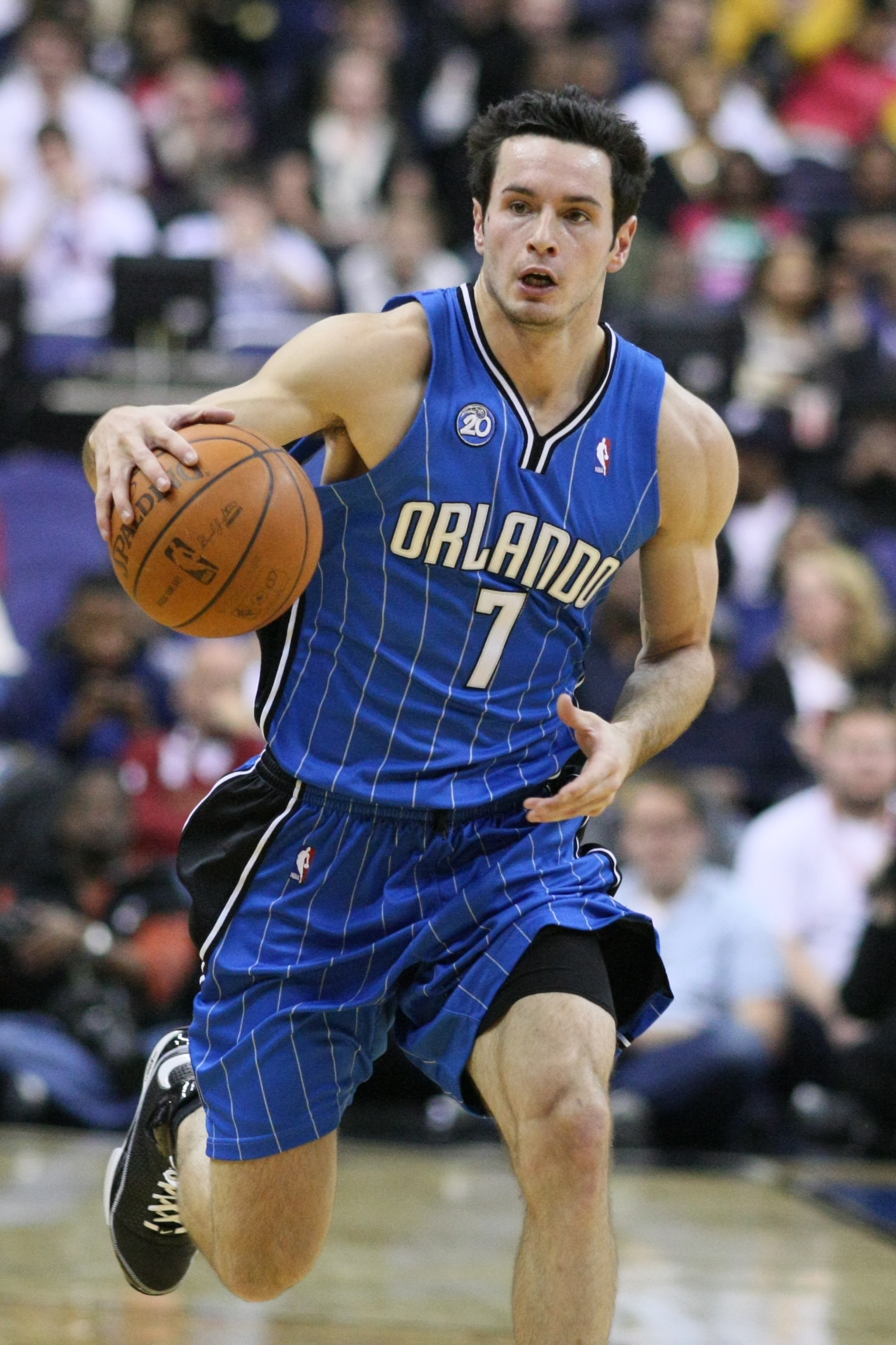
Redick during his tenure with the Magic

Redick competed against Trevor Ariza and Keith Bogans for the starting shooting guard spot in 2007–08. He was pulled from playing more than once for his lack of defense during the preseason. He came into the season as a third-string player and saw limited action due to back spasms, but moved into limited rotation after Ariza was traded to the Los Angeles Lakers early in the season. In January 2008, Redick posted on his personal blog that "it's been proven that even if I play well in the limited minutes I get that not much is going to change." On January 31, 2008, the Orlando Sentinel reported that Redick had asked his agent, Arn Tellem, to inquire about a possible trade. "We want to see what's out there," Redick said. "I want to stay here, but it's been frustrating." Magic coach Stan Van Gundy responded: "Right now it would be very hard to fit him in. I know it's also hard to keep sitting him on the bench... Should we be playing him? Right now we're going good so we probably won't disrupt things." The Orlando Magic confirmed Van Gundy's comments by stating that Redick would not receive more minutes or a trade before the February 21, 2008 trade deadline.

In the 2008–09 season, Redick averaged 17.4 minutes per game instead of the previous season's 8.1; he played in 64 games instead of the previous season's 34. He averaged six points per game. The Magic made it to the NBA Finals, but lost to the Lakers in five games. Redick started all seven games in the Eastern Conference Semifinals in place of regular starter Courtney Lee.

On March 28, 2010, Redick set career highs in rebounds (7), assists (8) and minutes played (46). Vince Carter was injured just 95 seconds into the game; backup swingman Mickael Pietrus was also injured, leaving Redick to play the entire game.

On July 9, 2010, the Chicago Bulls signed Redick to a three-year, $19 million offer sheet. The Magic matched this offer on July 16, 2010, retaining the rights to Redick. On April 25, 2012, Redick achieved a career high with the Magic, scoring 31 points against the Charlotte Bobcats.

=== Milwaukee Bucks (2013) ===
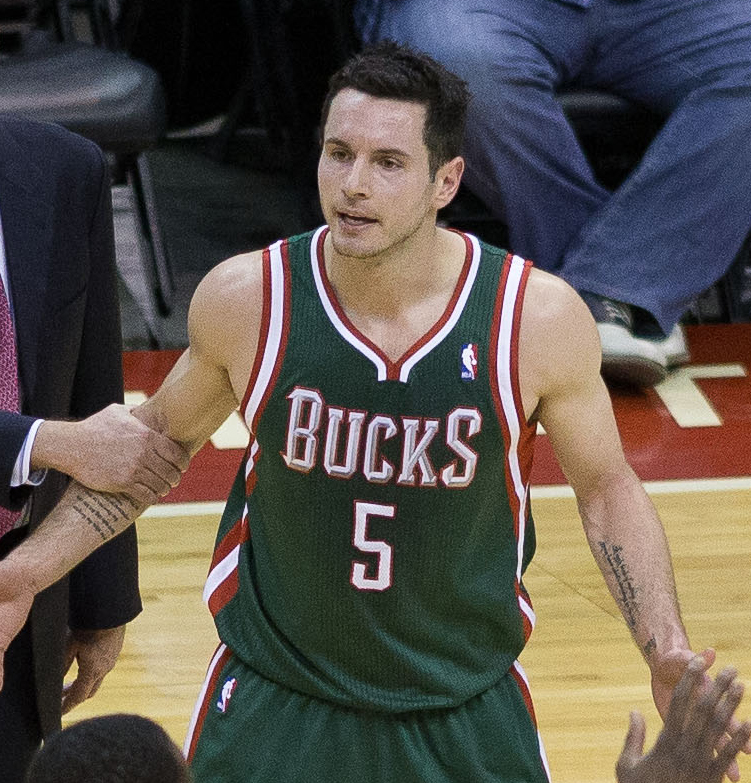
Redick with the Bucks in 2013

On February 21, 2013, Redick was traded from the Magic to the Milwaukee Bucks along with guard Ish Smith and forward Gustavo Ayón for guard Beno Udrih, guard Doron Lamb, and forward Tobias Harris. Redick had difficulties in Milwaukee and his performance suffered.

=== Los Angeles Clippers (2013–2017) ===
On July 10, 2013, Redick was acquired by the Los Angeles Clippers via a three-team sign-and-trade deal that also involved the Bucks and the Phoenix Suns. Redick reportedly signed a four-year, $27 million contract. Redick started 218 of the first 219 games he played for the Clippers, becoming a "full-fledged starter" in the NBA. On January 15, 2014, Redick scored a then career-high 33 points in a 129–127 win over the Dallas Mavericks.

On January 18, 2016, Redick scored a career-high 40 points in a 140–132 overtime win over the Houston Rockets. He connected on his first five attempts behind the arc and finished 9-of-12 on three-pointers, tying Caron Butler's franchise record for three-pointers made in a game. He later competed in the Three-Point Contest during the 2016 NBA All-Star weekend.

On November 5, 2016, Redick increased his streak of consecutive games with a made three-pointer to 62, in a 116–92 win over the San Antonio Spurs. He also completed a four-point play against the Spurs, the 26th of his career. On April 12, 2017, Redick made three 3-pointers against Sacramento in the regular-season finale to finish with 201, breaking his career high and single-season franchise record of 200. The Clippers went on to lose in the first round of the NBA playoffs in seven games to the Utah Jazz.

=== Philadelphia 76ers (2017–2019) ===
On July 8, 2017, Redick signed a one-year, $23 million contract with the Philadelphia 76ers. On November 3, 2017, Redick scored 31 points on 11-of-19 shooting with 8-of-12 from 3-point range in a 121–110 win over the Indiana Pacers. On November 25, 2017, he hit eight 3-pointers and scored 29 points in a 130–111 win over the Orlando Magic. Redick missed seven games in January 2018 with a leg injury.

On July 6, 2018, Redick re-signed with the 76ers. Redick was moved to the bench for the start of the 2018–19 season and on October 20, he had his best game since moving to the bench, scoring 31 points on 10-of-20 shooting, including eight 3-pointers, in a 116–115 win over the Magic. On December 19, in a 131–109 win over the New York Knicks, Redick scored his 10,000th career point. On February 8, he scored a season-high 34 points in a 117–110 win over the Denver Nuggets. On March 19, he was two assists shy of his first NBA triple-double in 761 career games, finishing with 27 points, 10 rebounds and eight assists in a 118–114 win over the Charlotte Hornets. In April 2019, Redick set the franchise record for most 3-pointers in a season, surpassing Kyle Korver's mark of 226 set in 2004–05.

=== New Orleans Pelicans (2019–2021) ===
On July 15, 2019, Redick signed with the New Orleans Pelicans. After finishing the pandemic-shortened season with a record of 30–42, the Pelicans missed the playoffs, marking the first time in Redick's career that he missed the playoffs. He was reunited with his former Magic head coach Stan Van Gundy in his second season in New Orleans.

=== Dallas Mavericks (2021) ===
Redick was traded to the Dallas Mavericks on March 26, 2021. He made his debut with the Mavs on April 12.

On September 21, 2021, Redick announced his retirement from playing basketball.

== Coaching career ==
=== Los Angeles Lakers (2024–present) ===
Redick was announced as the 29th head coach of the Los Angeles Lakers on June 24, 2024. With this, Redick became a rookie head coach with no prior coaching experience other than serving as a volunteer head coach of the fourth-grade boys team at Brooklyn Basketball Academy, where his 9-year-old son played. In his coaching debut on October 22, the Lakers defeated the Minnesota Timberwolves 110–103 for a season-opening win. Redick coached the Lakers to a 50–32 record, the third-best in the Western Conference, in his first season as head coach. They were eliminated by the Timberwolves in five games of the first round of the playoffs. Earlier in the series, Redick was widely criticized in game 4 for making no second-half substitutions, as the Lakers squandered a double-digit fourth-quarter lead by shooting 5-of-18 from the field in the final period of a 116–113 defeat.

On September 25, 2025, Redick and the Lakers agreed to a contract extension. On April 1, 2026, Redick earned his 100th victory as a head coach and, in the process, coached the Lakers to a back-to-back 50-win campaign, becoming the first Lakers coach to do so since Phil Jackson in the 2010–11 season. Redick later won his first playoff series as a coach, defeating the Houston Rockets in six games in the first round of the 2026 NBA playoffs.

== National team career ==
Redick was a member of the 2003 USA Junior World Championship Team. In 2005, he competed with the USA Basketball Under-21 Team, which won a gold medal at the Global Games. In 2006, Redick was named to the 2006–2008 USA national team program. He competed for a spot with the team for the 2008 Olympics, but was not placed on the final roster. A recurring back injury kept him from competing in the 2007 FIBA Americas Championship.

== Media career ==
The Old Man and the Three
- Genre: Sports
- Format: Video podcast
- Language: English

Cast and voices
- Hosted by: J.J. Redick; Tommy Alter

Production
- Length: 45 minutes–90 minutes

Publication
- No. of episodes: 174
- Original release: July 2020 – June 2024
- Provider: ThreeFourTwo Productions

Related
- Website: threefourtwo.com/podcasts/the-old-man-and-the-three/

JJ Redick
- Years active: 2021–2024
- Sports commentary career
- Genre: Color commentator
- Sport: NBA
- Employer: ESPN

=== Podcasting ===
In January 2016, Redick launched a podcast on Yahoo! Sports. He was the first active NBA player and the second active professional athlete (Note: A. J. Hawk was the first active professional athlete to start a podcast.) to host a podcast. Redick said that he did not get any pushback from the organizations about doing the podcast and attributed that to focusing on getting the basketball work done first.

He began in 2016 at Yahoo! Sports, hosting The Vertical. In July 2017, he moved his podcast to Uninterrupted, under the title The Chronicles of Redick. After meeting producer and writer Tommy Alter, Redick decided to continue his podcast on The Ringer in 2017. Redick hosted three seasons on the Ringer: two as a solo host, and the third with Alter as co-host.

In 2020, he left The Ringer to own his content and start his own media company, co-founding ThreeFourTwo Productions with Alter, a reference to the 342 shots he would take every Sunday during the off-season. He hosted "The Old Man and the Three" along with Alter before announcing his departure to coach the Lakers. The podcast premiered August 5, 2020, inside the NBA bubble in Orlando, Florida with Portland Trail Blazers guard Damian Lillard as the first guest. Redick's The Old Man and the Three has over 320 million views on YouTube and 4.8 stars on Apple Podcasts.

In March 2024, Redick and LeBron James launched a podcast called Mind the Game, co-produced by Redick and James' production companies, ThreeFourTwo Productions and Uninterrupted, where the two have "pure conversations about basketball". In June 2024, Redick announced that he would be going on an indefinite hiatus from podcasting to take the job of head coach for the Los Angeles Lakers.

In Redick's absence, The Old Man and the Three has continued to be hosted by Alter and an alternating selection of other NBA players. A non-exhaustive list of players to host includes Cameron Johnson and Trey Murphy. Under these new hosts, the program has sometimes been known as "The Young Man and the Three".

=== Broadcasting ===
After he retired as a player, Redick became an on-air sports analyst for ESPN, occasionally appearing on First Take. He debuted on November 3, 2021, as a studio analyst for coverage of the Brooklyn Nets-Atlanta Hawks game.

In August 2023, Redick was added to the second core broadcast team of ESPN with Ryan Ruocco and Richard Jefferson. In February 2024, he was moved to the lead team of Mike Breen and Doris Burke, replacing Doc Rivers, who became head coach of the Milwaukee Bucks. In June 2024, Redick left ESPN to become head coach of the Lakers.

== Awards and honors ==
- NBA 3-point field goal percentage leader (2016)
- Consensus College Player of the Year (2006)
- 2× consensus first-team All-American (2005, 2006)
- Consensus third-team All-American (2004)
- Associated Press First Team All-American:: 2005, 2006
- Associated Press Player of the Year: 2006
- The Sporting News National Player of the Year: 2005, 2006
- United States Basketball Writers Association's Oscar Robertson Trophy College Basketball Co-Player of the Year: 2006
- Naismith College Player of the Year National Player of the Year: 2006
- John R. Wooden Player of the Year Award: 2006
- John R. Wooden All-American Team: 2006
- United States Basketball Writers Association(USBWA): 2006
- NABC Player of the Year: 2006
- 2x ACC Tournament MVP (2005, 2006)
- Ten-time ACC Player of the Week
- Lowe's Senior CLASS Award (2006)
- National Association of Basketball Coaches Co-Player of the Year: 2006)
- James E. Sullivan Award (2005)
- Anthony J. McKelvin Award (ACC Athlete of the Year for all sports): (2006)
- 2× Adolph Rupp Trophy (2005–2006)
- 2× ACC Player of the Year (2005, 2006)
- 2× First-team All-ACC (2005, 2006)
- 2× ACC tournament MVP (2005, 2006)
- Adolph Rupp Trophy (2004–2005)
- Third-team All-American (2004)
- Second-team All-ACC (2004)
- 3x All-ACC (2003, 2003, 2004)
- 3x All-ACC tournament (2003, 2005, 2006)
- ACC All Freshman (2002, 2003)
- Second-team Parade All-American (2002))
- Virginia Mr. Basketball (2002)
- Virginia's all-time AAA leading scorer with 2,215 career points and shot more than 44 percent from 3-point arc during his career.
- Was named the 2002 A.P. Virginia Player of the Year
- Three-time Gatorade Virginia Player of the Year
- 2002 Virginia Mr. Basketball
- Parade Magazine All-America second team and USA Today All-USA second team.
- Won the 2002 McDonald's 3-point shooting competition.
- Played on two AAU teams (Hampton's Boo Williams All-Stars) that won national championships.
- No. 4 retired by Duke Blue Devils (2007)
- Won Virginia AAA state title championship at Cave Spring High (2002)
- McDonald's All-American Game MVP (2002)
- 2x AAU first team All-American (2002)
- Inducted in VHSL hall of fame (2021)

=== Records ===
==== NCAA ====
- Career FT%, min 600 FTM – 91.2%
- Sophomore season FT%, 95.3%

===== ACC =====
- Career ACC Player of the Week (12, tied Antawn Jamison)
- Single-season three point shots made (139)
- Career three point shots made (457)
- Single-season free throw percentage (95.3%, also 2nd and 3rd)
- Freshman-season free throw percentage (91.9%)
- Junior-season free throw percentage (93.8%)
- Career free throw percentage (91.2%)

===== ACC Tournament =====
- Career points (225)
- Tournament MVPs (2, tied Len Chappell, Tommy Burleson & Larry Miller)

===== ACC Championship game =====
- single-game three point shots made in regulation (7, tied Hunter Cattoor)

==== NBA ====
===== Los Angeles Clippers =====
- single-season 3-point field goal percentage (.475, 2015–16)
- single-season 3-point field goals made (201, 2016–17)

===== Philadelphia 76ers =====
- single-season 3-point field goals made (240, 2018–19)

===== New Orleans Pelicans =====
- single-season 3-point field goals percentage (.453, 2019–20)

== Career statistics ==
Legend
GP	Games played	GS	Games started	MPG	Minutes per game
FG%	Field goal percentage	3P%	3-point field goal percentage	FT%	Free throw percentage
RPG	Rebounds per game	APG	Assists per game	SPG	Steals per game
BPG	Blocks per game	PPG	Points per game	**Bold**	Career high
*	Led the league

=== NBA ===
==== Regular season ====
Year	Team	GP	GS	MPG	FG%	3P%	FT%	RPG	APG	SPG	BPG	PPG
2006–07	Orlando	42	0	14.8	.410	.388	.900	1.2	.9	.3	.0	6.0
2007–08	Orlando	34	0	8.1	.444	.395	.794	.7	.5	.1	.0	4.1
2008–09	Orlando	64	5	17.4	.391	.374	.871	1.7	1.1	.3	.0	6.0
2009–10	Orlando	**82***	9	22.0	.439	.405	.860	1.9	1.9	.3	.0	9.6
2010–11	Orlando	59	5	25.4	.441	.397	.875	1.9	1.7	.5	.1	10.1
2011–12	Orlando	65	22	27.2	.425	.418	.911	2.3	2.5	.4	.1	11.6
2012–13	Orlando	50	11	**31.5**	.450	.390	.891	2.4	**4.4**	.6	.1	15.1
2012–13	Milwaukee	28	2	28.7	.403	.318	.918	1.9	2.7	.3	.1	12.3
2013–14	L.A. Clippers	35	34	28.2	.455	.395	.915	2.1	2.2	**.8**	.1	15.2
2014–15	L.A. Clippers	78	**78**	30.9	.477	.437	.901	2.1	1.8	.5	.1	16.4
2015–16	L.A. Clippers	75	75	28.0	**.480**	**.475***	.888	1.9	1.4	.6	.1	16.3
2016–17	L.A. Clippers	78	**78**	28.2	.445	.429	.891	2.2	1.4	.7	**.2**	15.0
2017–18	Philadelphia	70	70	30.2	.460	.420	.904	**2.5**	3.0	.5	.1	17.1
2018–19	Philadelphia	76	63	31.3	.440	.397	.894	2.4	2.7	.4	**.2**	**18.1**
2019–20	New Orleans	60	36	26.3	.453	.453	.892	2.5	2.0	.3	**.2**	15.3
2020–21	New Orleans	31	0	18.6	.407	.364	**.957**	1.7	1.3	.3	.1	8.7
2020–21	Dallas	13	0	11.3	.358	.395	.800	.9	.8	.2	.1	4.4
Career		940	488	25.5	.447	.415	.892	2.0	2.0	.4	.1	12.8

==== Playoffs ====
Year	Team	GP	GS	MPG	FG%	3P%	FT%	RPG	APG	SPG	BPG	PPG
2007	Orlando	1	0	11.0	**.500**	**1.000**	—	.0	2.0	.0	.0	3.0
2008	Orlando	2	0	5.0	.000	.000	—	.5	.0	.0	.0	.0
2009	Orlando	**16**	8	20.4	.373	.404	.929	1.2	1.9	.5	.1	6.0
2010	Orlando	14	0	19.2	.423	.429	.857	1.7	1.4	.7	.0	7.5
2011	Orlando	6	0	20.0	.357	.067	.750	1.8	1.0	.2	.2	6.7
2012	Orlando	5	0	24.6	.432	.211	.857	1.0	**3.2**	.2	.0	10.8
2013	Milwaukee	4	0	17.3	.440	.333	**1.000**	.8	1.3	.3	.0	7.3
2014	L.A. Clippers	13	13	27.0	.459	.400	.962	1.7	1.5	**.8**	.0	13.3
2015	L.A. Clippers	14	**14**	**38.6**	.435	.398	.943	**2.1**	1.7	.7	**.4**	14.9
2016	L.A. Clippers	6	6	27.7	.430	.355	.667	2.0	.8	.2	.2	13.5
2017	L.A. Clippers	7	7	29.4	.380	.346	.850	1.7	.9	.3	.0	9.1
2018	Philadelphia	10	10	34.2	.444	.347	.857	1.5	2.6	**.8**	.1	**18.2**
2019	Philadelphia	12	12	31.3	.435	.414	.850	1.4	1.6	.1	.3	13.4
Career		110	70	26.5	.425	.371	.879	1.6	1.6	.5	.1	10.9

=== College ===
Year	Team	GP	GS	MPG	FG%	3P%	FT%	RPG	APG	SPG	BPG	PPG
2002–03	Duke	33	30	30.7	.413	.399	.919	2.5	2.0	1.2	.1	15.0
2003–04	Duke	37	35	31.1	.423	.395	**.953**	3.1	1.6	.7	.1	15.9
2004–05	Duke	33	33	**37.3**	.408	.403	.938	**3.3**	**2.6**	1.1	.1	21.8
2005–06	Duke	36	36	37.1	**.470**	**.421**	.863	2.0	**2.6**	**1.4**	.1	**26.8**
Career		139	134	34.0	.433	.406	.912	2.7	2.2	1.1	.1	19.9

== Head coaching record ==
Legend
Regular season	G	Games coached	W	Games won	L	Games lost	W–L %	Win–loss %
Playoffs	PG	Playoff games	PW	Playoff wins	PL	Playoff losses	PW–L %	Playoff win–loss %

Team	Year	G	W	L	W–L%	Finish	PG	PW	PL	PW–L%	Result
L.A. Lakers	2024–25	82	50	32	.610	1st in Pacific	5	1	4	.200	Lost in first round
L.A. Lakers	2025–26	82	53	29	.646	1st in Pacific	10	4	6	.400	Lost in conference semifinals
Career		164	103	61	.628		15	5	10	.333	

== Personal life ==
Redick was born in Cookeville, Tennessee, the son of Jeanie and Ken Redick. His father played basketball for two seasons at Ohio Wesleyan University, and his older twin sisters, Catie and Alyssa, both played for Campbell University. His younger brother, David, was a tight end for the Marshall University's football team until he decided not to play due to injury. He then moved to Orlando with JJ before going back home and attending Virginia Tech. His youngest sister, Abigail, played basketball for Virginia Tech and Drexel University. Redick was nicknamed "JJ" as a toddler because his twin sisters repeated his original nickname of "J". His father's background as a stoneware potter led to his middle name, "Clay." Redick graduated from Duke University with a major in history and a minor in cultural anthropology.

Redick is a Christian. Redick has four tattoos of Bible verses: Isaiah 40:31, Joshua 1:9, Psalm 40:1–3, and Philippians 4:13, as well as a tattoo sleeve of the Virgin Mary.

On June 13, 2006, Redick was arrested and charged with driving under the influence of alcohol in Durham County, North Carolina. His blood-alcohol level was 0.11, while the legal limit in North Carolina is 0.08. Redick was released on a $1,000 bond shortly after being arrested. Redick pleaded guilty.

On June 26, 2010, Redick married longtime girlfriend Chelsea Kilgore. They have two children together, Knox and Kai.

On January 9, 2025, Redick's home in Pacific Palisades was destroyed by the Palisades Fire.

== See also ==
- List of NBA career 3-point scoring leaders
- List of NBA career 3-point field goal percentage leaders
- List of NBA career free throw percentage leaders
- List of NBA annual statistical leaders
- List of NBA annual three-point field goal percentage leaders
- List of NCAA Division I men's basketball career scoring leaders
- List of NCAA Division I men's basketball career 3-point scoring leaders
