= Mario Lanza: The American Caruso =

Videotape cover

Mario Lanza: The American Caruso is a 90-minute 1983 PBS documentary, narrated and hosted by Plácido Domingo. It explores the life of tenor Mario Lanza, and includes clips from six of the tenor's eight films, together with interviews with such Lanza associates and contemporaries as Anna Moffo, Kathryn Grayson, Zsa Zsa Gabor, Joe Pasternak, and Dorothy Kirsten, Frances Yeend, and the conductor Peter Herman Adler. The film also includes interviews and remembrances from Lanza's mother and all four of his children. Production credits as follows: written by Stephen Chodorov, director John Musilli, writer and producer JoAnn Young.

The documentary film was nominated for a Primetime Emmy in 1983 as Outstanding Informational Special.
