= List of NBA annual statistical leaders =

Every year, the National Basketball Association (NBA) awards titles to various leaders in the five basketball statistical categories—points, rebounds, assists, steals and blocked shots. Both the scoring title and the assists title were recognized in the 1946–47 BAA season are also recognized, when the league played its first season. The rebounding title was recognized in the 1950–51 NBA season. Both the steals title and the blocks title were recognized in the 1973–74 NBA season. Additionally, the three-point field goals title is also recognized as well during the 3-point implementation in the 1979–80 NBA season. The minutes title was recognized in the 1951–52 NBA season.

== Key ==
^	Denotes player who is still active in the NBA
*	Elected to the Naismith Memorial Basketball Hall of Fame
†	Not yet eligible for Hall of Fame consideration (Note: A player is not eligible for induction into the Naismith Memorial Basketball Hall of Fame until he has been fully retired for two calendar years.)
§	1st time eligible for Hall of Fame in 2027
Player (X)	Denotes the number of times the player had been the leader in the particular category up to and including that season

== Statistics leaders ==
Season	Scoring	Rebounding	Assists	Steals	Blocks	Minutes	FG%	3P%	FT%
1946–47	Joe Fulks*	—	Ernie Calverley	—	—	—	Bob Feerick	—	Fred Scolari
1947–48	Max Zaslofsky	—	Ernie Calverley (2)	—	—	—	Buddy Jeannette*	—	Bob Feerick
1948–49	George Mikan*	—	Bob Davies*	—	—	—	Arnie Risen*	—	Bob Feerick (2)
1949–50	George Mikan* (2)	—	Andy Phillip*	—	—	—	Alex Groza	—	Max Zaslofsky
1950–51	George Mikan* (3)	Dolph Schayes*	Andy Phillip* (2)	—	—	—	Alex Groza (2)	—	Joe Fulks*
1951–52	Paul Arizin*	Larry Foust	Andy Phillip* (3)	—	—	Paul Arizin*	Paul Arizin*	—	Bobby Wanzer*
1951–52	Paul Arizin*	Mel Hutchins	Andy Phillip* (3)	—	—	Paul Arizin*	Paul Arizin*	—	Bobby Wanzer*
1952–53	Neil Johnston*	George Mikan*	Bob Cousy*	—	—	Neil Johnston*	Ed Macauley*	—	Bill Sharman*
1952–53	Neil Johnston*	George Mikan*	Bob Cousy*	—	—	Neil Johnston*	Neil Johnston*	—	Bill Sharman*
1953–54	Neil Johnston* (2)	Harry Gallatin*	Bob Cousy* (2)	—	—	Neil Johnston* (2)	Ed Macauley* (2)	—	Bill Sharman* (2)
1954–55	Neil Johnston* (3)	Neil Johnston*	Bob Cousy* (3)	—	—	Paul Arizin* (2)	Larry Foust	—	Bill Sharman* (3)
1955–56	Bob Pettit*	Bob Pettit*	Bob Cousy* (4)	—	—	Jack George	Neil Johnston* (2)	—	Bill Sharman* (4)
1956–57	Paul Arizin* (2)	Maurice Stokes*	Bob Cousy* (5)	—	—	Dolph Schayes*	Neil Johnston* (3)	—	Bill Sharman* (5)
1957–58	George Yardley*	Bill Russell* (1)	Bob Cousy* (6)	—	—	Dolph Schayes* (2)	Jack Twyman*	—	Dolph Schayes*
1958–59	Bob Pettit* (2)	Bill Russell* (2)	Bob Cousy* (7)	—	—	Bill Russell*	Ken Sears	—	Bill Sharman* (6)
1959–60	Wilt Chamberlain*	Wilt Chamberlain*	Bob Cousy* (8)	—	—	Wilt Chamberlain*	Ken Sears (2)	—	Dolph Schayes* (2)
1960–61	Wilt Chamberlain* (2)	Wilt Chamberlain* (2)	Oscar Robertson*	—	—	Wilt Chamberlain* (2)	Wilt Chamberlain*	—	Bill Sharman* (7)
1961–62	Wilt Chamberlain* (3)	Wilt Chamberlain* (3)	Oscar Robertson* (2)	—	—	Wilt Chamberlain* (3)	Walt Bellamy*	—	Dolph Schayes* (3)
1962–63	Wilt Chamberlain* (4)	Wilt Chamberlain* (4)	Guy Rodgers	—	—	Wilt Chamberlain* (4)	Wilt Chamberlain* (2)	—	Larry Costello
1963–64	Wilt Chamberlain* (5)	Bill Russell* (3)	Oscar Robertson* (3)	—	—	Wilt Chamberlain* (5)	Jerry Lucas*	—	Oscar Robertson*
1964–65	Wilt Chamberlain* (6)	Bill Russell* (4)	Oscar Robertson* (4)	—	—	Oscar Robertson*	Wilt Chamberlain* (3)	—	Larry Costello (2)
1965–66	Wilt Chamberlain* (7)	Wilt Chamberlain* (5)	Oscar Robertson* (5)	—	—	Wilt Chamberlain* (6)	Wilt Chamberlain* (4)	—	Larry Siegfried
1966–67	Rick Barry*	Wilt Chamberlain* (6)	Guy Rodgers (2)	—	—	Wilt Chamberlain* (7)	Wilt Chamberlain* (5)	—	Adrian Smith
1967–68	Dave Bing*	Wilt Chamberlain* (7)	Wilt Chamberlain*	—	—	Wilt Chamberlain* (8)	Wilt Chamberlain* (6)	—	Oscar Robertson* (2)
1968–69	Elvin Hayes*	Wilt Chamberlain* (8)	Oscar Robertson* (6)	—	—	Wilt Chamberlain* (9)	Wilt Chamberlain* (7)	—	Larry Siegfried (2)
1969–70	Jerry West*	Elvin Hayes*	Lenny Wilkens*	—	—	Elvin Hayes*	Johnny Green	—	Flynn Robinson
1970–71	Lew Alcindor*	Wilt Chamberlain* (9)	Norm Van Lier	—	—	John Havlicek*	Johnny Green (2)	—	Chet Walker*
1971–72	Kareem Abdul-Jabbar* (2)	Wilt Chamberlain* (10)	Jerry West*	—	—	John Havlicek* (2)	Wilt Chamberlain* (8)	—	Jack Marin
1972–73	Nate Archibald*	Wilt Chamberlain* (11)	Nate Archibald*	—	—	Nate Archibald*	Wilt Chamberlain* (9)	—	Rick Barry*
1973–74	Bob McAdoo*	Elvin Hayes* (2)	Ernie DiGregorio	Larry Steele	Elmore Smith	Elvin Hayes* (2)	Bob McAdoo*	—	Ernie DiGregorio
1974–75	Bob McAdoo* (2)	Wes Unseld*	Kevin Porter	Rick Barry*	Kareem Abdul-Jabbar*	Bob McAdoo*	Don Nelson	—	Rick Barry* (2)
1975–76	Bob McAdoo* (3)	Kareem Abdul-Jabbar*	Slick Watts	Slick Watts	Kareem Abdul-Jabbar* (2)	Bob McAdoo* (2)	John Shumate	—	Rick Barry* (3)
1975–76	Bob McAdoo* (3)	Kareem Abdul-Jabbar*	Slick Watts	Slick Watts	Kareem Abdul-Jabbar* (2)	Bob McAdoo* (2)	Wes Unseld*	—	Rick Barry* (3)
1976–77	Pete Maravich*	Bill Walton*	Don Buse	Don Buse	Bill Walton*	Pete Maravich*	Kareem Abdul-Jabbar*	—	Ernie DiGregorio (2)
1977–78	George Gervin*	Truck Robinson	Kevin Porter (2)	Ron Lee	George Johnson	Truck Robinson	Bobby Jones	—	Rick Barry* (4)
1978–79	George Gervin* (2)	Moses Malone*	Kevin Porter (3)	M. L. Carr	Kareem Abdul-Jabbar* (3)	Moses Malone*	Cedric Maxwell	—	Rick Barry* (5)
1979–80	George Gervin* (3)	Swen Nater	Micheal Ray Richardson	Micheal Ray Richardson	Kareem Abdul-Jabbar* (4)	Norm Nixon	Cedric Maxwell (2)	Fred Brown	Rick Barry* (6)
1980–81	Adrian Dantley*	Moses Malone* (2)	Kevin Porter (4)	Magic Johnson*	George Johnson (2)	Adrian Dantley*	Artis Gilmore*	Brian Taylor	Calvin Murphy*
1981–82	George Gervin* (4)	Moses Malone* (3)	Johnny Moore	Magic Johnson* (2)	George Johnson (3)	Moses Malone* (2)	Artis Gilmore* (2)	Campy Russell	Kyle Macy
1982–83	Alex English*	Moses Malone* (4)	Magic Johnson*	Micheal Ray Richardson (2)	Tree Rollins	Kelly Tripucka	Artis Gilmore* (3)	Mike Dunleavy	Calvin Murphy* (2)
1983–84	Adrian Dantley* (2)	Moses Malone* (5)	Magic Johnson* (2)	Rickey Green	Mark Eaton	Jeff Ruland	Artis Gilmore* (4)	Darrell Griffith	Larry Bird*
1984–85	Bernard King*	Moses Malone* (6)	Isiah Thomas*	Micheal Ray Richardson (3)	Mark Eaton (2)	Larry Bird*	James Donaldson	Byron Scott	Kyle Macy (2)
1985–86	Dominique Wilkins*	Bill Laimbeer	Magic Johnson* (3)	Alvin Robertson	Manute Bol	Maurice Cheeks*	Steve Johnson	Craig Hodges	Larry Bird* (2)
1986–87	Michael Jordan*	Charles Barkley*	Magic Johnson* (4)	Alvin Robertson (2)	Mark Eaton (3)	Larry Bird* (2)	Kevin McHale*	Kiki Vandeweghe	Larry Bird* (3)
1987–88	Michael Jordan* (2)	Michael Cage	John Stockton*	Michael Jordan*	Mark Eaton (4)	Michael Jordan*	Kevin McHale* (2)	Craig Hodges (2)	Jack Sikma
1988–89	Michael Jordan* (3)	Hakeem Olajuwon*	John Stockton* (2)	John Stockton*	Manute Bol (2)	Michael Jordan* (2)	Dennis Rodman*	Jon Sundvold	Magic Johnson*
1989–90	Michael Jordan* (4)	Hakeem Olajuwon* (2)	John Stockton* (3)	Michael Jordan* (2)	Hakeem Olajuwon*	Rodney McCray	Mark West	Steve Kerr	Larry Bird* (4)
1990–91	Michael Jordan* (5)	David Robinson*	John Stockton* (4)	Alvin Robertson (3)	Hakeem Olajuwon* (2)	Chris Mullin*	Buck Williams	Jim Les	Reggie Miller*
1991–92	Michael Jordan* (6)	Dennis Rodman*	John Stockton* (5)	John Stockton* (2)	David Robinson*	Chris Mullin* (2)	Buck Williams (2)	Dana Barros	Mark Price
1992–93	Michael Jordan* (7)	Dennis Rodman* (2)	John Stockton* (6)	Michael Jordan* (3)	Hakeem Olajuwon* (3)	Larry Johnson*	Cedric Ceballos	B. J. Armstrong	Mark Price (2)
1993–94	David Robinson*	Dennis Rodman* (3)	John Stockton* (7)	Nate McMillan	Dikembe Mutombo*	Latrell Sprewell	Shaquille O'Neal*	Tracy Murray	Mahmoud Abdul-Rauf
1994–95	Shaquille O'Neal*	Dennis Rodman* (4)	John Stockton* (8)	Scottie Pippen*	Dikembe Mutombo* (2)	Vin Baker	Chris Gatling	Steve Kerr (2)	Spud Webb
1995–96	Michael Jordan* (8)	Dennis Rodman* (5)	John Stockton* (9)	Gary Payton*	Dikembe Mutombo* (3)	Anthony Mason	Gheorghe Mureșan	Tim Legler	Mahmoud Abdul-Rauf (2)
1996–97	Michael Jordan* (9)	Dennis Rodman* (6)	Mark Jackson	Mookie Blaylock	Shawn Bradley	Anthony Mason (2)	Gheorghe Mureșan (2)	Glen Rice	Mark Price (3)
1997–98	Michael Jordan* (10)	Dennis Rodman* (7)	Rod Strickland	Mookie Blaylock (2)	Marcus Camby	Michael Finley	Shaquille O'Neal* (2)	Dale Ellis	Chris Mullin*
1998–99 (Note: The 1998–99 NBA season was shortened to 50 games due to the league's lockout. The qualification of this season's statistical leaders is lowered.)	Allen Iverson*	Chris Webber*	Jason Kidd*	Kendall Gill	Alonzo Mourning*	Allen Iverson*	Shaquille O'Neal* (3)	Dell Curry	Reggie Miller* (2)
1999–00	Shaquille O'Neal* (2)	Dikembe Mutombo*	Jason Kidd* (2)	Eddie Jones	Alonzo Mourning* (2)	Michael Finley (2)	Shaquille O'Neal* (4)	Hubert Davis	Jeff Hornacek
2000–01	Allen Iverson* (2)	Dikembe Mutombo* (2)	Jason Kidd* (3)	Allen Iverson*	Theo Ratliff	Michael Finley (3)	Shaquille O'Neal* (5)	Brent Barry	Reggie Miller* (3)
2001–02	Allen Iverson* (3)	Ben Wallace*	Andre Miller	Allen Iverson* (2)	Ben Wallace*	Allen Iverson* (2)	Shaquille O'Neal* (6)	Steve Smith	Reggie Miller* (4)
2002–03	Tracy McGrady*	Ben Wallace (2)*	Jason Kidd* (4)	Allen Iverson* (3)	Theo Ratliff (2)	Allen Iverson* (3)	Eddy Curry	Allan Houston	Bruce Bowen
2003–04	Tracy McGrady* (2)	Kevin Garnett*	Jason Kidd* (5)	Baron Davis	Theo Ratliff (3)	Allen Iverson* (4)	Shaquille O'Neal* (7)	Anthony Peeler	Peja Stojaković
2004–05	Allen Iverson* (4)	Kevin Garnett* (2)	Steve Nash*	Larry Hughes	Andrei Kirilenko	LeBron James^	Shaquille O'Neal* (8)	Fred Hoiberg	Reggie Miller* (5)
2005–06	Kobe Bryant*	Kevin Garnett* (3)	Steve Nash* (2)	Gerald Wallace	Marcus Camby (2)	Allen Iverson* (5)	Shaquille O'Neal* (9)	Richard Hamilton	Steve Nash
2006–07	Kobe Bryant (2)*	Kevin Garnett* (4)	Steve Nash* (3)	Baron Davis (2)	Marcus Camby (3)	Allen Iverson* (6)	Mikki Moore	Jason Kapono	Kyle Korver
2007–08	LeBron James^	Dwight Howard*	Chris Paul^{†}	Chris Paul^{†}	Marcus Camby (4)	Allen Iverson* (7)	Andris Biedriņš	Jason Kapono (2)	Peja Stojaković (2)
2008–09	Dwyane Wade*	Dwight Howard* (2)	Chris Paul^{†} (2)	Chris Paul^{†} (2)	Dwight Howard*	Andre Iguodala	Shaquille O'Neal* (10)	Anthony Morrow	José Calderón
2009–10	Kevin Durant^	Dwight Howard* (3)	Steve Nash* (4)	Rajon Rondo	Dwight Howard* (2)	Monta Ellis	Dwight Howard*	Kyle Korver	Steve Nash* (2)
2010–11	Kevin Durant^ (2)	Kevin Love^	Steve Nash* (5)	Chris Paul^{†} (3)	Andrew Bogut	Monta Ellis (2)	Nenê	Matt Bonner	Stephen Curry^
2011–12 (Note: The 2011–12 NBA season was shortened to 66 games due to the league's lockout. The qualification of this season's statistical leaders is lowered.)	Kevin Durant^ (3)	Dwight Howard* (4)	Rajon Rondo	Chris Paul^{†} (4)	Serge Ibaka	Luol Deng	Tyson Chandler	Steve Novak	Jamal Crawford
2012–13	Carmelo Anthony*	Dwight Howard* (5)	Rajon Rondo (2)	Chris Paul^{†} (5)	Serge Ibaka (2)	Luol Deng (2)	DeAndre Jordan^	José Calderón	Kevin Durant^
2013–14	Kevin Durant^ (4)	DeAndre Jordan^	Chris Paul^{†} (3)	Chris Paul^{†} (6)	Anthony Davis^	Carmelo Anthony*	DeAndre Jordan^ (2)	Kyle Korver (2)	Brian Roberts
2014–15	Russell Westbrook^{†}	DeAndre Jordan^ (2)	Chris Paul^{†} (4)	Kawhi Leonard^	Anthony Davis^ (2)	Jimmy Butler^	DeAndre Jordan^ (3)	Kyle Korver (3)	Stephen Curry^ (2)
2015–16	Stephen Curry^	Andre Drummond^	Rajon Rondo (3)	Stephen Curry^	Hassan Whiteside	James Harden^	DeAndre Jordan^ (4)	JJ Redick	Stephen Curry^ (3)
2016–17	Russell Westbrook^{†} (2)	Hassan Whiteside	James Harden^	Draymond Green^	Rudy Gobert^	LeBron James^ (2)	DeAndre Jordan^ (5)	Kyle Korver (4)	CJ McCollum^
2017–18	James Harden^	Andre Drummond^ (2)	Russell Westbrook^{†}	Victor Oladipo^{§}	Anthony Davis^ (3)	LeBron James^ (3)	Clint Capela^	Darren Collison	Stephen Curry^ (4)
2018–19	James Harden^ (2)	Andre Drummond^ (3)	Russell Westbrook^{†} (2)	Paul George^	Myles Turner^	Bradley Beal^	Rudy Gobert^	Joe Harris	Malcolm Brogdon^{†}
2019–20	James Harden^ (3)	Andre Drummond^ (4)	LeBron James^	Ben Simmons^	Hassan Whiteside (2)	Damian Lillard^	Mitchell Robinson^	George Hill	Brad Wanamaker
2020–21	Stephen Curry^ (2)	Clint Capela^	Russell Westbrook^{†} (3)	Jimmy Butler^	Myles Turner^ (2)	Julius Randle^	Rudy Gobert^ (2)	Joe Harris (2)	Chris Paul^{†}
2021–22	Joel Embiid^	Rudy Gobert^	Chris Paul^{†} (5)	Dejounte Murray^	Jaren Jackson Jr.^	Pascal Siakam^	Rudy Gobert^ (3)	Luke Kennard^	Jordan Poole^
2022–23	Joel Embiid^ (2)	Domantas Sabonis^	James Harden^ (2)	OG Anunoby^	Jaren Jackson Jr.^ (2)	Pascal Siakam^ (2)	Nic Claxton^	Luke Kennard^ (2)	Tyler Herro^
2023–24	Luka Dončić^	Domantas Sabonis^ (2)	Tyrese Haliburton^	De'Aaron Fox^	Victor Wembanyama^	DeMar DeRozan^	Daniel Gafford^	Grayson Allen^	Klay Thompson^
2024–25	Shai Gilgeous-Alexander^	Domantas Sabonis^ (3)	Trae Young^	Dyson Daniels^	Victor Wembanyama^ (2)	Josh Hart^	Jarrett Allen^	Seth Curry	Stephen Curry^ (5)
2025–26	Luka Dončić^ (2)	Nikola Jokić^	Nikola Jokić^	Ausar Thompson^	Victor Wembanyama^ (3)	Tyrese Maxey^	Rudy Gobert^ (4)	Luke Kennard^ (3)	Cam Spencer^
