= My Next Guest Needs No Introduction with David Letterman =

American television talk show

- Genre: Talk show
- Directed by: Michael Bonfiglio; Mark A. Ritchie; Michael Steed; Helen M. Cho
- Presented by: David Letterman
- Composer: Paul Shaffer
- Country of origin: United States
- Original language: English
- No. of seasons: 5
- No. of episodes: 33

Production
- Executive producers: Justin Wilkes; Dave Sirulnick; Jon Kamen; Tom Keaney; Mark A. Ritchie; Chris Cechin-De La Rosa; Christopher Collins; Lydia Tenaglia; Mary Barclay; Sandra Zweig; Alexandra Lowry; Tony Hernandez; Lilly Burns; John Skidmore; Brooke Posch; Michael Steed; Séamus Murphy-Mitchell; Jake Fuller; Isabel Richardson; Yolanda T. Cochran
- Cinematography: Declan Quinn; Kenneth F. Wales; Cameron Barnett; Brandon Alperin; Jeremy Leach; Ethan Mills; Mo Fallon
- Editors: Jesse Gordon; Edward A. Bishop; Paul Little; Dave Marcus; Dave Carter; Claude Shires; Jon Philpot; Jennifer Gill McGarrity; Tom Patterson; Dan O'Brien; Cori Wapnowska; Christopher Dillon; Jasmin Way; Brian Ray; Matt Askinazi; Jon Higgins; Andrew Mendelson; Lilli Janney; Jonathan Cianfrani
- Running time: 44–61 minutes
- Production companies: RadicalMedia; Zero Point Zero Production; Jax Media; Worldwide Pants

Original release
- Network: Netflix
- Release: January 12, 2018 – present

My Next Guest Needs No Introduction with David Letterman (commonly referred to as My Next Guest) is an American television talk show hosted by David Letterman that premiered on January 12, 2018, on Netflix. The series consists of interviews with one guest per episode both inside and outside a studio setting. The show has received generally positive reviews, with its format, Letterman's hosting, choice of guests, and insightful conversations receiving praise. My Next Guest has been nominated for the Primetime Emmy Award for Outstanding Hosted Nonfiction Series or Special four times.

== Production ==
=== Development ===
On August 8, 2017, Netflix announced it had ordered a six-episode interview series starring David Letterman. Each hour-long episode was set to feature Letterman conducting a long-form conversation with a single guest and in-the-field segments, in which he would explore topics on his own.

On January 5, 2018, it was announced that Letterman's guests in the first season would include Barack Obama, George Clooney, Malala Yousafzai, Jay-Z, Tina Fey, and Howard Stern. It was also announced that the series would premiere on January 12, 2018, with Letterman's interview with Obama. This interview was Obama's first since leaving office.

On December 14, 2018, it was announced that Netflix had renewed the series for a second season consisting of six episodes. On May 31, 2019, five new episodes were released. On June 21, a bonus episode was released.

=== Music ===
The show's theme song and bridging music were written and recorded by Letterman's long-time bandleader, Paul Shaffer. Soon after it was announced publicly that Netflix had given the series an order, Shaffer received a phone call from Letterman asking him to work on the show. Soon after, Shaffer began to receive cuts of episodes from the first season, and he started to put music in afterwards where the director thought it was needed.

In developing the sound of the show's music, Shaffer initially looked to Letterman for guidance. Finding none, he remembered his and Letterman's shared love for the sort of music produced at the Muscle Shoals Sound Studio in Sheffield, Alabama, describing it as "the honesty you hear, the southern soul feeling". The score initially included drums, but the show's producers and director thought that the music should "feel like it's Dave's old friend Paul playing", so it was ultimately stripped down to solely include piano, organ and bass guitar.

== Episodes ==
=== Series overview ===
| Season | Episodes | Originally released | |
| Season | Episodes | First released | Last released |
|---|---|---|---|
| 1 | 6 | January 12, 2018 | May 31, 2018 |
| 1 | Bonus | May 8, 2018 | |
| 2 | 5 | May 31, 2019 | |
| 2 | Bonus | June 21, 2019 | |
| Special | | October 25, 2019 | |
| 3 | 4 | October 21, 2020 | |
| 4 | 6 | May 20, 2022 | |
| Special | | December 12, 2022 | |
| Special | | April 30, 2024 | |
| 5 | 3 | June 12, 2024 | April 8, 2025 |
| Special | | December 1, 2025 | |
| 6 | 3 | December 16, 2025 | |

=== Season 1 (2018) ===
| No. overall | No. in season | Title | Guest | Original release date |
|---|---|---|---|---|
| 1 | 1 | "Barack Obama" "It's a Whole New Ball Game Now" (Note: This is the original episode title at the time of release. It was later replaced with the featured guest's name.) | Barack Obama | January 12, 2018 |
Cold open: Letterman interviewing then-President Obama on Late Show with David Letterman. On-location segment: Walking with Congressman John Lewis across the Edmund Pettus Bridge, site of the civil rights movement's Bloody Sunday in 1965.
| 2 | 2 | "George Clooney" "You Be the Newsman, I'll Be Liz Taylor" | George Clooney | February 9, 2018 |
Cold open: Letterman and Clooney outside of LAX watching planes land and eating fast food. On-location segment: At the home of Nick Clooney meeting Iraqi refugee Hazim Avdal whom the Clooney family is sponsoring.
| 3 | 3 | "Malala Yousafzai" "You Know, She Has a Nobel Peace Prize" | Malala Yousafzai | March 9, 2018 |
Cold open: Letterman accompanies Malala as she leads a tour group at Lady Margaret Hall, Oxford. On-location segment: Malala continues to lead the tour group as Letterman tags along, the pair browse in the University of Oxford shop, and Letterman eats lunch with Malala's father.
| 4 | 4 | "JAY-Z" "I Had a Paper Route Too" | Jay-Z | April 6, 2018 |
On-location segment: Letterman visits Shangri La Studio, speaks with music producer Rick Rubin and listens to Madison Ryann Ward recording.
| 5 | 5 | "Tina Fey" "It's Just Land Mine Hopscotch" | Tina Fey | May 4, 2018 |
On-location segment: Letterman and Blues musician Buddy Guy eat chicken and fries at the Athenian Room, one of Tina Fey's Chicago hangouts, while talking about the origins of the Chicago Blues. Later, Guy performs “Skin Deep”, accompanied by Paul Shaffer, at his nightclub, Buddy Guy’s Legends.
| 6 | 6 | "Howard Stern" | Howard Stern | May 31, 2018 |
Cold open: Letterman interviewing Stern on Late Night with David Letterman. On-location segment: Letterman rides horses with paleontologist/geologist Christa Sadler at Grand Staircase–Escalante National Monument.

==== Bonus (2018) ====
| No. overall | Title | Guest | Original release date |
|---|---|---|---|
| 7 | "You're David Letterman, You Idiot" | Jerry Seinfeld | May 8, 2018 |
In a behind-the-scenes Netflix event, Jerry Seinfeld and David Letterman interview each other.

=== Season 2 (2019) ===
| No. overall | No. in season | Title | Guest | Original release date |
|---|---|---|---|---|
| 8 | 1 | "Kanye West" | Kanye West | May 31, 2019 |
On-location segment: Letterman visits Kanye's house and tries some of his clothes.
| 9 | 2 | "Ellen DeGeneres" | Ellen DeGeneres | May 31, 2019 |
On-location segment: Behind the scenes on The Ellen DeGeneres Show.
| 10 | 3 | "Tiffany Haddish" | Tiffany Haddish | May 31, 2019 |
On-location segment: Letterman joins Tiffany Haddish in her backyard to do some gardening.
| 11 | 4 | "Lewis Hamilton" | Lewis Hamilton | May 31, 2019 |
On-location segment: Letterman races young drivers on a go-kart track; Hamilton drives laps in a 2019 Mercedes AMG F1 W10 EQ Power+ and drives Letterman around a circuit in a Mercedes-AMG E63, Letterman drives Hamilton in a station wagon. Lewis Hamilton's father, Anthony Hamilton, is in the audience.
| 12 | 5 | "Melinda Gates" | Melinda Gates | May 31, 2019 |
On-location segment: Gates joins Letterman in a self-driving car simulator; Letterman meets Bill Gates at the offices of the Bill and Melinda Gates Foundation.

==== Bonus (2019) ====
| No. overall | Title | Guest | Original release date |
|---|---|---|---|
| 13 | "Zach Galifianakis" | Zach Galifianakis | June 21, 2019 |
Joining Dave at a special Netflix event, Zach Galifianakis pays tribute to childhood idols and shares juicy tidbits from the Between Two Ferns set.

=== Special (2019) ===
| No. overall | Title | Guest | Original release date |
|---|---|---|---|
| 14 | "My Next Guest with David Letterman and Shah Rukh Khan" | Shah Rukh Khan | October 25, 2019 |
"King of Bollywood" Shah Rukh Khan opens up about his rise to fame, his family, and his billions of fans as he and Letterman meet up in Mumbai and New York.

=== Season 3 (2020) ===
| No. overall | No. in season | Title | Guest | Original release date |
|---|---|---|---|---|
| 15 | 1 | "Kim Kardashian West" | Kim Kardashian West | October 21, 2020 |
On-location segment: Kardashian and Letterman shop for test supplies in a CVS Pharmacy.
| 16 | 2 | "Robert Downey Jr." | Robert Downey Jr. | October 21, 2020 |
On-location segment: At the home of Robert Downey Jr. in Malibu, Letterman checks out Downey's mini-zoo.
| 17 | 3 | "Dave Chappelle" | Dave Chappelle | October 21, 2020 |
On-location segment: An audience at "Chappelle Summer Camp", Chappelle walks Letterman through his hometown of Yellow Springs, Ohio
| 18 | 4 | "Lizzo" | Lizzo | October 21, 2020 |
Music superstar Lizzo invites Letterman to lay down a track at her home studio as they chat about flutes, protests, her time working with Prince and more.

=== Season 4 (2022) ===
| No. overall | No. in season | Title | Guest(s) | Original release date |
|---|---|---|---|---|
| 19 | 1 | "Billie Eilish" | Billie Eilish, Finneas O'Connell | May 20, 2022 |
Dave visits Billie Eilish to discuss inspiration, influences and imposter syndrome — and works in a little go-karting and Auto-tuning.
| 20 | 2 | "Will Smith" | Will Smith | May 20, 2022 |
Will Smith recalls his rap origins, the lasting impact of his parents, spiritual explorations, and one very fateful night at Quincy Jones' house.
| 21 | 3 | "Cardi B" | Cardi B | May 20, 2022 |
Cardi B and Dave split a chopped cheese in a Bronx bodega and chat hooky parties, hip-hop, parenting, political science and protesting injustice.
| 22 | 4 | "Ryan Reynolds" | Ryan Reynolds | May 20, 2022 |
Ryan Reynolds makes pizza for Dave while he discusses his youth in Canada, early days as an actor, life as a father and love of Welsh football.
| 23 | 5 | "Kevin Durant" | Kevin Durant | May 20, 2022 |
Dave and Kevin Durant go one-on-one in basketball, shuffleboard and conversation as they cover family, focus, trash-talking, social media and more.
| 24 | 6 | "Julia Louis-Dreyfus" | Julia Louis-Dreyfus | May 20, 2022 |
Julia Louis-Dreyfus takes Dave fishing and talks growing up with two families, serving Gumby tea on Saturday Night Live and reality overtaking fiction with Veep.

=== Special (2022) ===
| No. overall | Title | Guest | Original release date |
|---|---|---|---|
| 25 | "My Next Guest with David Letterman and Volodymyr Zelenskyy" | Volodymyr Zelenskyy | December 12, 2022 |
Dave travels to Kyiv to sit down with Ukrainian president Volodymyr Zelenskyy in front of a small live audience in a subway station.

=== Special (2024) ===
| No. overall | Title | Guest | Original release date |
|---|---|---|---|
| 26 | "My Next Guest with David Letterman and John Mulaney" | John Mulaney | April 30, 2024 |
John Mulaney returns to his Chicago high school with David Letterman as they candidly discuss addiction, fatherhood and the state of stand-up comedy.

=== Season 5 (2024−25) ===
| No. overall | No. in season | Title | Guest(s) | Original release date |
|---|---|---|---|---|
| 27 | 1 | "Miley Cyrus" | Miley Cyrus | June 12, 2024 |
Miley Cyrus performs an intimate show at the Chateau Marmont and opens up to Dave about songwriting, sobriety and separating herself from Hannah Montana.
| 28 | 2 | "Charles Barkley" | Charles Barkley | June 12, 2024 |
Charles Barkley goes golfing with Dave and shares his unfiltered opinions on the NBA and WNBA, his transition to analyst and the fight against racism.
| 29 | 3 | "Caitlin Clark" | Caitlin Clark | April 8, 2025 |
During an episode that segues from an Indianapolis donut shop to a lecture series at Letterman's alma mater of Ball State University, and then to duckpin bowling in Indianapolis, Caitlin Clark discusses her life, career, and issues surrounding the WNBA. Letterman also travels to the University of Iowa to talk with Clark's coach with the Hawkeyes, the now-retired Lisa Bluder.

=== Special (2025) ===
| No. overall | Title | Guest | Original release date |
|---|---|---|---|
| 30 | "My Next Guest with David Letterman and Adam Sandler" | Adam Sandler | December 1, 2025 |
Adam Sandler invites Dave backstage on his comedy tour, then they sit down at NYU to chat about stand-up, famous roles and his beloved Stratocaster.

=== Season 6 (2025) ===
| No. overall | No. in season | Title | Guest(s) | Original release date |
|---|---|---|---|---|
| 31 | 1 | "Michael B. Jordan" | Michael B. Jordan | December 16, 2025 |
In London, Michael B. Jordan and Dave play darts at a pub, then sit down to talk Sinners, directing his own films, and taking a punch to the face.
| 32 | 2 | "MrBeast" | MrBeast | December 16, 2025 |
Jimmy Donaldson, aka MrBeast, invites Dave to his hometown to teach him about wildly expensive viral stunts, philanthropy, and how to bury yourself alive.
| 33 | 3 | "Jason Bateman" | Jason Bateman | December 16, 2025 |
Jason Bateman and Dave step into the batter's box at Dodger Stadium, then discuss sports, SmartLess and how Arrested Development revived his career. Guest narrator: Ron Howard

== Reception ==
=== Critical response ===
The first season of My Next Guest Needs No Introduction has been met with a positive response from critics. On the review aggregation website Rotten Tomatoes, the first season holds an 83% approval rating with an average rating of 6.79 out of 10 based on 29 reviews. The website's critical consensus reads, "My Next Guest may not be groundbreaking, but a more intimate setting provides ample room for intelligent, insightful interviews with interesting subjects that go beyond standard late-night conversations." Metacritic, which uses a weighted average, assigned the season a score of 70 out of 100 based on 13 critics, indicating "generally favorable reviews".

=== Awards and nominations ===
| Year | Award | Category | Nominee(s) | Result | Ref. |
|---|---|---|---|---|---|
| 2018 | Primetime Creative Arts Emmy Awards | Outstanding Informational Series or Special | My Next Guest Needs No Introduction with David Letterman | Nominated | |
| 2019 | Primetime Creative Arts Emmy Awards | Outstanding Informational Series or Special | My Next Guest Needs No Introduction with David Letterman | Nominated | |
| 2021 | Primetime Creative Arts Emmy Awards | Outstanding Hosted Nonfiction Series or Special | My Next Guest Needs No Introduction with David Letterman | Nominated | |
| 2022 | Primetime Creative Arts Emmy Awards | Outstanding Hosted Nonfiction Series or Special | My Next Guest Needs No Introduction with David Letterman | Nominated | |
| 2023 | Primetime Creative Arts Emmy Awards | Outstanding Hosted Nonfiction Series or Special | My Next Guest Needs No Introduction with David Letterman and Volodymyr Zelenskyy | Nominated | |
| 2024 | Primetime Creative Arts Emmy Awards | Outstanding Hosted Nonfiction Series or Special | My Next Guest with David Letterman and John Mulaney | Won | |
| 2025 | Primetime Creative Arts Emmy Awards | Outstanding Hosted Nonfiction Series or Special | My Next Guest Needs No Introduction with David Letterman | Nominated | |
