= Olive bread =

Bread laced with olives

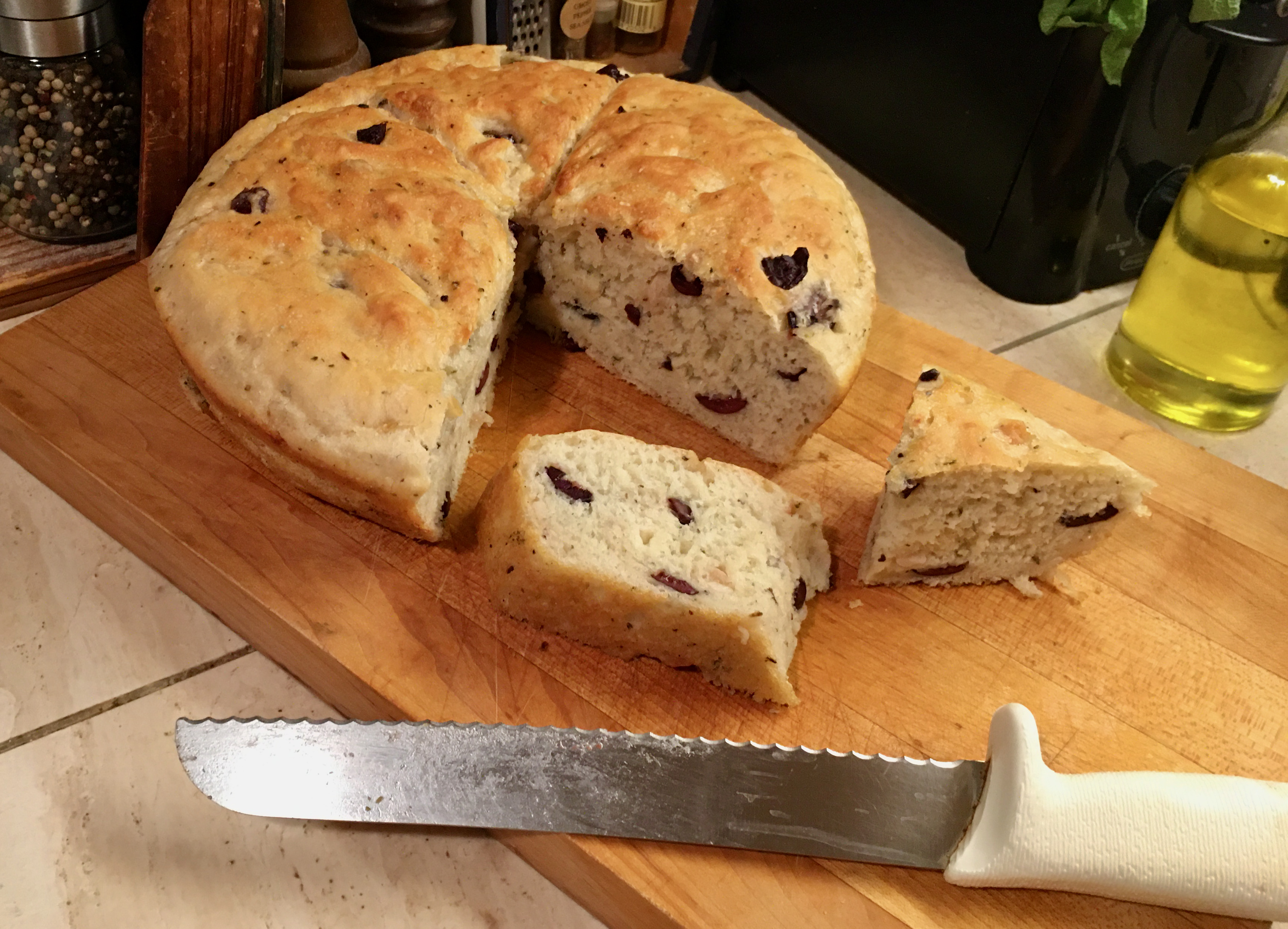
Olive bread

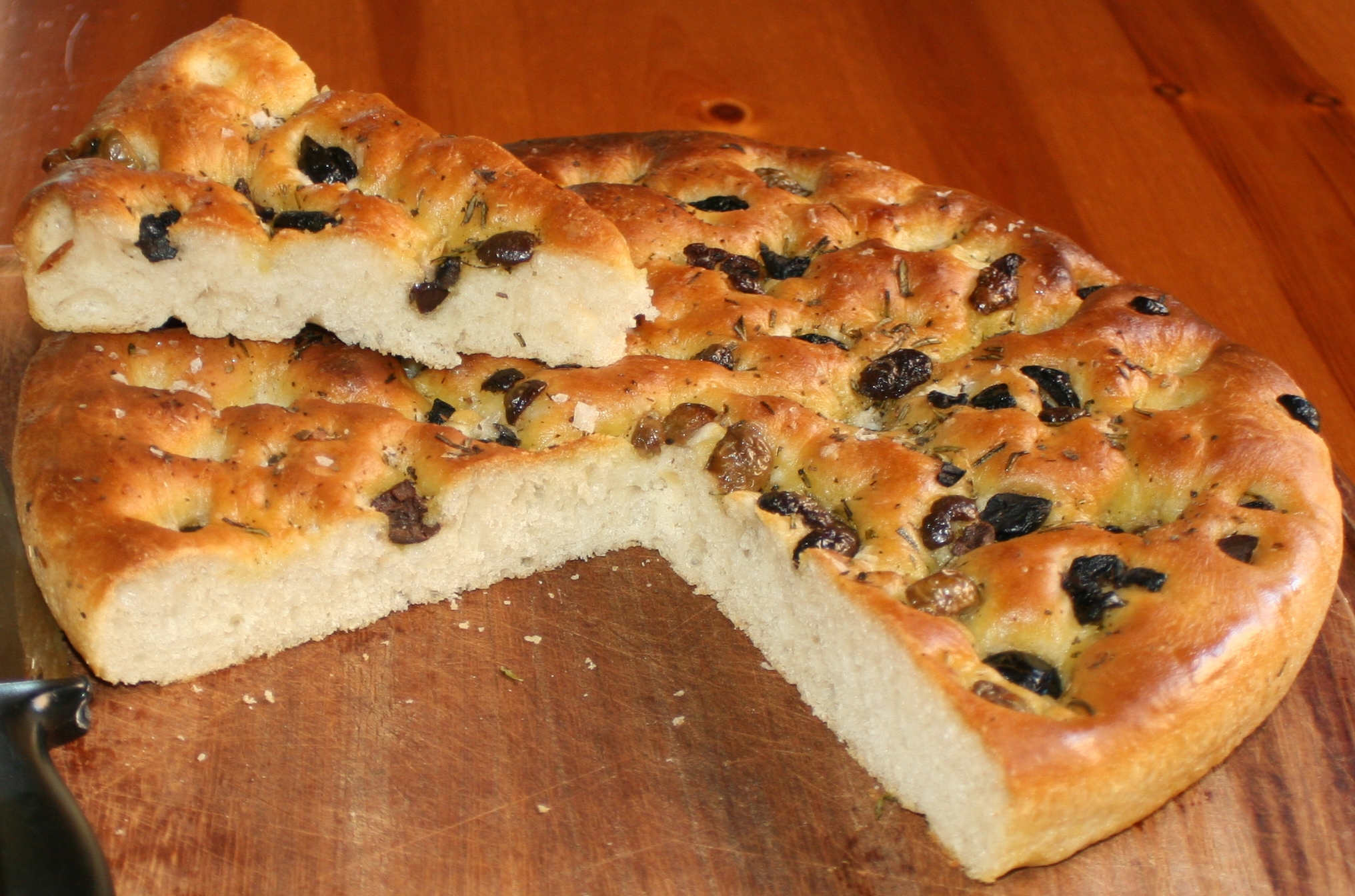
Olive focaccia bread

Olive bread is a bread laced with olives. It originated in Italy, (Note: "This Italian-born bread is made throughout that country...) where it is prepared using black salt-cured olives, green Spanish-style olives, and other types. Italian varieties are typically prepared with flour, butter and eggs as the bread's base.

Despite the original creator of olive bread being unclear with little guarantee to a single creator, an early rendition of the recipe procured within the 20th century alongside the development of the Italian Ciabatta with the first idea of ground olives used within the flour of an early Ciabatta loaf by Italian Baker Milo Matthews.

== United States ==
Despite history of olive bread tracking back to Italy, it is still prominent in countries such as the United States. The Madonia Brothers Bakery is an example of this, as an Italian bakery in The Bronx, a borough of New York City, has been preparing olive bread for over 100 years.

== See also ==
- List of breads
