= List of awards and nominations received by Stanley Tucci =

Stanley Tucci awards and nominations
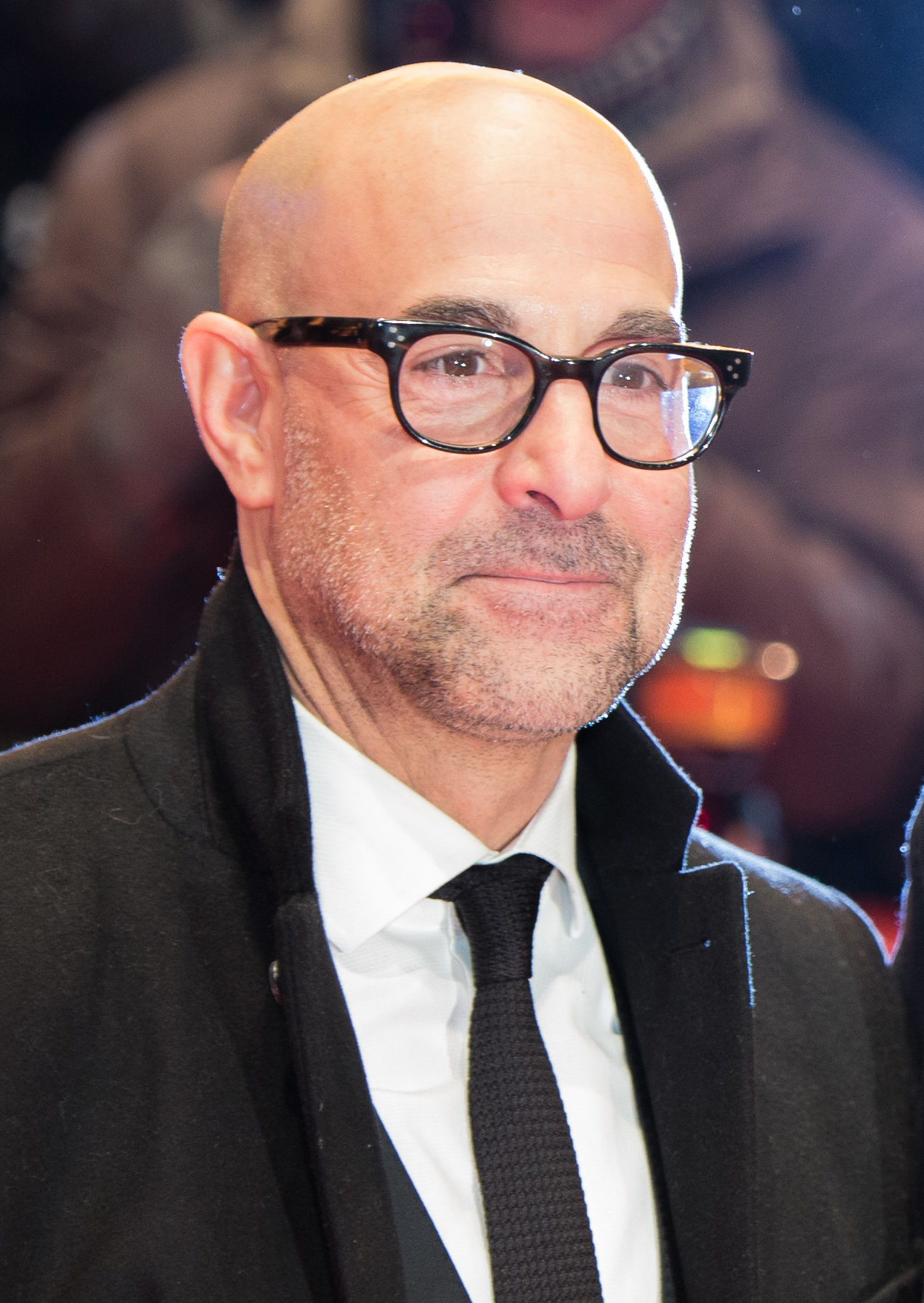
- Tucci at Berlinale in 2017
Awards and nominations
Award	Wins	Nominations
Academy Awards	0	1
BAFTA Awards	0	1
Emmy Awards	7	12
Golden Globes	2	3
Grammy Award	0	1
SAG Awards	2	4
Tony Awards	0	1

Totals (Note: Certain award groups do not simply award one winner. They acknowledge several different recipients, have runners-up, and have third place. Since this is a specific recognition and is different from losing an award, runner-up mentions are considered wins in this award tally. For simplification and to avoid errors, each award in this list has been presumed to have had a prior nomination.)
- Wins: 67
- Nominations: 156

Stanley Tucci is an American actor known for his roles in on stage and screen. His accolades include seven Emmy Awards, two Golden Globe Awards and two Screen Actors Guild Awards as well as nominations for an Academy Award, a BAFTA Award, and a Tony Award.

Tucci gained early acclaim as the writer-director of the black comedy Big Night (1996) which he also acted in. He co-directed the film with Campbell Scott and co-wrote the film with Joseph Tropiano. He earned the Independent Spirit Award for Best First Screenplay, the Sundance Film Festival Waldo Salt Screenwriting Award, the New York Film Critics Circle for Best New Director, and two Boston Society of Film Critics Awards for Best New Director and Best Screenplay. He was nominated for two Independent Spirit Awards for Best First Feature and Best Male Lead.

As an actor, Tucci gained acclaim for his sinister role in the Peter Jackson fantasy drama The Lovely Bones (2009) for which he was nominated for the Academy Award for Best Supporting Actor, the BAFTA Award for Best Actor in a Supporting Role, the Golden Globe Award for Best Supporting Actor – Motion Picture, and the Screen Actors Guild Award for Outstanding Performance by a Male Actor in a Supporting Role. He portrayed Mitchell Garabedian in the biographical drama Spotlight (2015) and the progressive Cardinal Aldo Bellini in the political drama Conclave (2025) for which he was received, along with the ensemble, two Screen Actors Guild Awards for Outstanding Performance by a Cast in a Motion Picture.

Tucci portrayed Walter Winchell in the HBO film Winchell (1999) earning the Primetime Emmy Award, Golden Globe Award, and Screen Actors Guild Award for Outstanding Actor in a Miniseries or Television Movie. He played Nazi party officer Adolf Eichmann in the HBO drama film Conspiracy (2001) winning a Golden Globe Award as well as an Primetime Emmy Award nomination. For his guest role as a method actor in the NBC crime comedy series Monk he won the Primetime Emmy Award for Outstanding Guest Actor in a Comedy Series. He was nominated his dramatic guest role as an abrasive doctor in the NBC medical drama ER. He portrayed studio head Jack L. Warner in the FX limited series Feud: Bette and Joan (2017) for which he was nominated for the Primetime Emmy Award for Outstanding Supporting Actor in a Limited Series or Movie.

Tucci is also known as a producer having won the Primetime Emmy Award for Outstanding Short Form Variety Series for the web series Park Bench with Steve Buscemi in 2016. He also hosted the CNN travel series Stanley Tucci: Searching for Italy (2021–2022) and the National Geographic series Tucci in Italy (2025–present) for which he won three Primetime Emmy Awards for Outstanding Hosted Nonfiction Series or Special. He has also received a Grammy Award nomination along with Meryl Streep for Best Spoken Word Album for Children for their joint performance in The One and Only Shrek (2008). On stage, he portrayed a gruff and honest cook in love in the two person Broadway revival of the Terrence McNally play Frankie and Johnny in the Clair de Lune (2002) for which he was nominated for the Tony Award for Best Actor in a Play.

== Major awards ==
=== Academy Awards ===
Year	Category	Work	Result	Ref.
2009	Best Supporting Actor	The Lovely Bones	Nominated	

=== BAFTA Awards ===
Year	Category	Work	Result	Ref.
British Academy Film Awards
2009	Best Actor in a Supporting Role	The Lovely Bones	Nominated	

=== Emmy Awards ===
Year	Category	Nominated work	Result	Ref.
Primetime Emmy Awards
1995	Outstanding Supporting Actor in a Drama Series	Murder One	Nominated	
1999	Outstanding Lead Actor in a Miniseries or Movie	Winchell	Won	
2001	Outstanding Supporting Actor in a Miniseries or Movie	Conspiracy	Nominated	
2007	Outstanding Guest Actor in a Comedy Series	Monk (Episode: "Mr. Monk and the Actor")	Won	
2008	Outstanding Guest Actor in a Drama Series	ER (Episode: "The War Comes Home")	Nominated	
2014	Outstanding Short-Format Nonfiction Program	Park Bench with Steve Buscemi	Nominated	
2016	Outstanding Short Form Variety Series	Park Bench with Steve Buscemi	Won	
2017	Outstanding Supporting Actor in a Limited Series or Movie	Feud: Bette and Joan	Nominated	
2021	Outstanding Character Voice-Over Performance	Central Park (Episode: "A Fish Called Snakehead")	Nominated	
2021	Outstanding Hosted Nonfiction Series or Special	Stanley Tucci: Searching for Italy	Won	
2022	Outstanding Character Voice-Over Performance	Central Park (Episode: "Central Dark")	Nominated	
2022	Outstanding Hosted Nonfiction Series or Special	Stanley Tucci: Searching for Italy	Won	
2023	Outstanding Hosted Nonfiction Series or Special	Stanley Tucci: Searching for Italy	Won	
2025	Outstanding Hosted Nonfiction Series or Special	Tucci in Italy	Nominated	
2026	Outstanding Hosted Nonfiction Series or Special	Tucci in Italy	Won	

=== Golden Globe Awards ===
Year	Category	Nominated work	Result	Ref.
1998	Best Actor – Miniseries or Television Film	Winchell	Won	
2001	Best Supporting Actor – Television	Conspiracy	Won	
2009	Best Supporting Actor – Motion Picture	The Lovely Bones	Nominated	

=== Grammy Awards ===
Year	Category	Nominated work	Result	Ref.
2008	Best Spoken Word Album For Children (Note: Shared with Meryl Streep)	The One and Only Shrek	Nominated	

=== Screen Actors Guild Awards ===
Year	Category	Nominated work	Result	Ref.
1998	Outstanding Actor in a Miniseries or Television Movie	Winchell	Nominated	
2009	Outstanding Actor in a Supporting Role	The Lovely Bones	Nominated	
2015	Outstanding Cast in a Motion Picture	Spotlight	Won	
2024	Outstanding Cast in a Motion Picture	Conclave	Won	

=== Tony Awards ===
Year	Category	Nominated work	Result	Ref.
2003	Best Actor in a Play	Frankie and Johnny in the Clair de Lune	Nominated	

== Miscellaneous awards ==
Organizations	Year	Category	Work	Result	Ref.
Audie Awards	2006	Fiction, Unabridged	Road to Purgatory	Nominated	
Audie Awards	2008	Children's Title for Ages Up to Eight (shared with Meryl Streep)	The One and Only Shrek	Nominated	
Deauville Film Festival	1996	Jury Special Prize	Big Night	Won	
Deauville Film Festival	1996	Grand Special Prize	Big Night	Nominated	
Gotham Awards	2009	Tribute Award	—N/a	Won	
Gotham Awards	2011	Best Ensemble Cast	Margin Call	Nominated	
Gotham Awards	2015	Special Jury Award for Ensemble Performance	Spotlight	Won	
Independent Spirit Awards	1996	Best First Screenplay	Big Night	Won	
Independent Spirit Awards	1996	Best First Film	Big Night	Nominated	
Independent Spirit Awards	1996	Best Actor	Big Night	Nominated	
Independent Spirit Awards	2015	Robert Altman Award	Spotlight	Won	
Satellite Awards	1995	Best Supporting Actor – Television	Murder One	Won	
Satellite Awards	1996	Best Supporting Actor - Motion Picture Musical or Comedy	Big Night	Nominated	
Satellite Awards	2001	Best Supporting Actor – Television	Conspiracy	Nominated	
Satellite Awards	2015	Best Cast in a Motion Picture	Spotlight	Won	
Saturn Awards	2009	Best Supporting Actor	The Lovely Bones	Nominated	
Saturn Awards	2011	Best Supporting Actor	Captain America: The First Avenger	Nominated	
Sundance Film Festival	1996	Waldo Salt Screenwriting Award	Big Night	Won	
Sundance Film Festival	1996	Grand Jury Prize for Dramatic Feature	Big Night	Nominated	

== Critics awards ==
Year	Category	Nominated work	Result
1996	Boston Society of Film Critics Best New Director	Big Night	Won
1996	Boston Society of Film Critics Award for Best Screenplay	Big Night	Won
1996	New York Film Critics Circle Award for Best New Director	Big Night	Won
1996	Chicago Film Critics Association Award for Best Screenplay	Big Night	Nominated
2009	Broadcast Film Critics Association Award for Best Supporting Actor	The Lovely Bones	Nominated
2009	Chicago Film Critics Association Award for Best Supporting Actor	The Lovely Bones	Nominated
2009	Dallas–Fort Worth Film Critics Association Award for Best Supporting Actor	The Lovely Bones	3rd place
2009	Boston Society of Film Critics Award for Best Supporting Actor	Julie & Julia	2nd place
2013	Detroit Film Critics Society Award for Best Supporting Actor	The Hunger Games: Catching Fire	Nominated
