= Stanley Tucci on screen and stage =

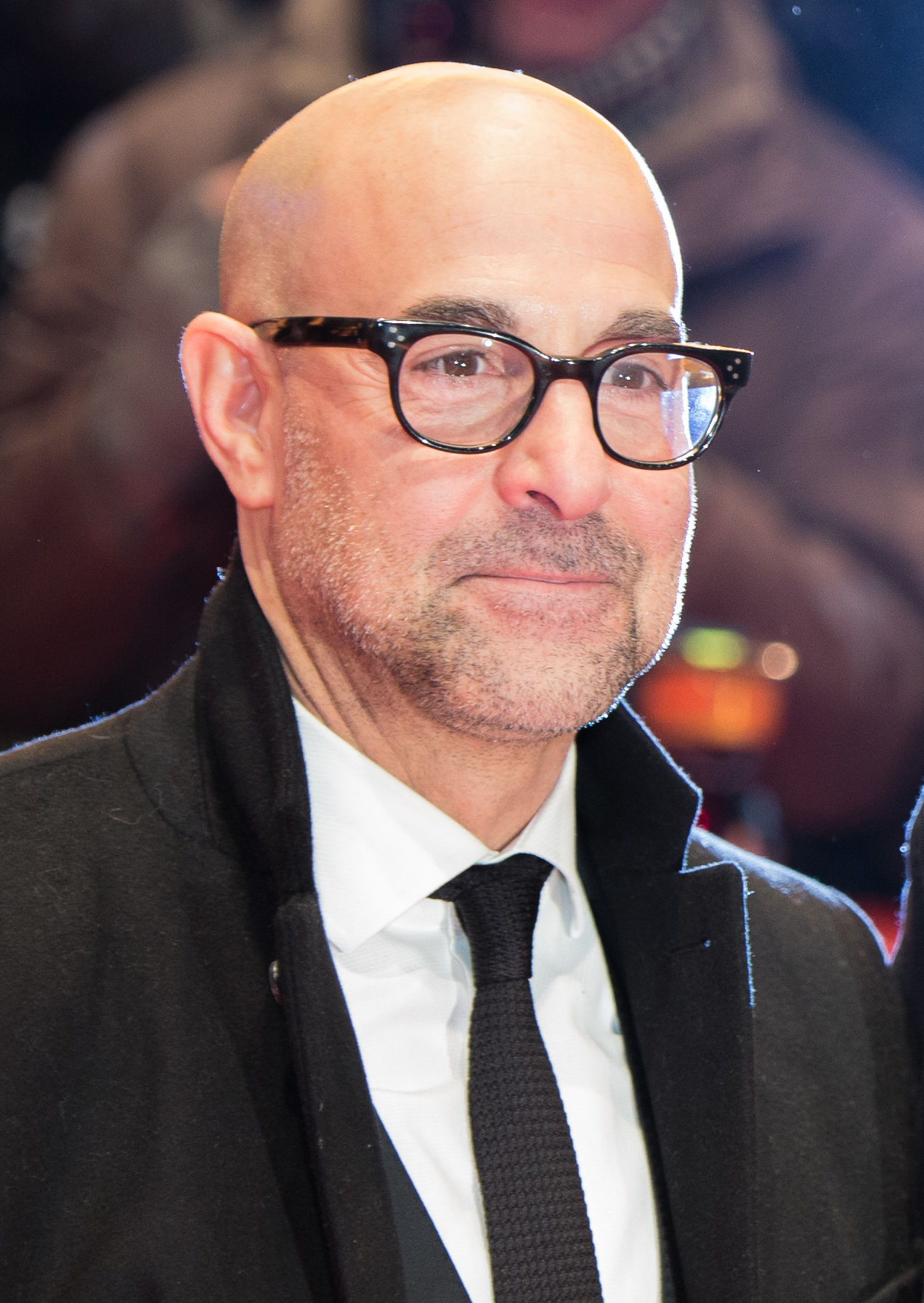
Tucci at the Berlin International Film Festival in 2017

Stanley Tucci is an American actor known for his performances in film, television, and theatre.

== Film ==
Year	Title	Role	Notes	Ref.
1985	Prizzi's Honor	Soldier		
1987	Who's That Girl	2nd Dock Worker		
1988	Monkey Shines	John Wiseman		
1989	Slaves of New York	Darryl		
1989	Fear, Anxiety & Depression	Donny		
1989	The Feud	Harvey Yelton		
1990	Quick Change	Johnny		
1990	Men of Respect	Mal D'Amico		
1991	Billy Bathgate	Charlie "Lucky" Luciano		
1992	In the Soup	Gregoire		
1992	Beethoven	Vernon		
1992	Prelude to a Kiss	Taylor		
1992	The Public Eye	Sal		
1993	Undercover Blues	Muerte		
1993	The Pelican Brief	Khamel		
1994	It Could Happen to You	Eddie Biasi		
1994	Mrs. Parker and the Vicious Circle	Fred Hunter		
1994	Somebody to Love	George		
1995	Jury Duty	Frank / Billy		
1995	Kiss of Death	District Attorney Frank Zioli		
1995	Sex and the Other Man	Arthur Wilkins		
1996	A Modern Affair	Peter Kessler		
1996	The Daytrippers	Louis D'Amico		
1996	Big Night	Secondo	Also writer, director and co-producer	
1997	Deconstructing Harry	Paul Epstein		
1997	The Alarmist	Heinrich Grigoris		
1997	A Life Less Ordinary	Elliot Zweikel		
1998	The Eighteenth Angel	Todd Stanton		
1998	Montana	Nicholas Roth		
1998	The Impostors	Arthur	Also writer, director and producer	
1999	A Midsummer Night's Dream	Puck		
1999	In Too Deep	Preston D'Ambrosio		
2000	Joe Gould's Secret	Joe Mitchell	Also director and producer	
2001	Sidewalks of New York	Griffin Risto		
2001	America's Sweethearts	Dave Kingman		
2001	The Whole Shebang	Giovanni Bazinni		
2002	Big Trouble	Arthur Herk		
2002	Road to Perdition	Frank Nitti		
2002	Maid in Manhattan	Jerry Siegel		
2003	The Core	Conrad Zimsky		
2004	Spin	Frank Haley		
2004	The Life and Death of Peter Sellers	Stanley Kubrick		
2004	The Terminal	Frank Dixon		
2004	Shall We Dance?	"Link" Peterson		
2005	Robots	Herb Copperbottom	Voice	
2006	Lucky Number Slevin	Detective Brikowski		
2006	The Devil Wears Prada	Nigel Kipling		
2006	The Hoax	Shelton Fisher		
2007	Four Last Songs	Larry		
2007	Blind Date	Don	Also writer and director	
2008	Kit Kittredge: An American Girl	Mr. Berk		
2008	Space Chimps	The Senator	Voice	
2008	Swing Vote	Martin Fox		
2008	What Just Happened	Scott Solomon		
2008	The Tale of Despereaux	Boldo	Voice	
2009	Julie & Julia	Paul Child		
2009	The Lovely Bones	George Harvey		
2010	Easy A	Dill Penderghast		
2010	Space Chimps 2: Zartog Strikes Back	The Senator	Voice; Direct-to-video	
2010	Burlesque	Sean		
2011	Margin Call	Eric Dale		
2011	Captain America: The First Avenger	Abraham Erskine		
2012	The Hunger Games	Caesar Flickerman		
2012	Gambit	Zaidenweber		
2012	The Company You Keep	Ray Fuller		
2013	Jack the Giant Slayer	Lord Roderick		
2013	Percy Jackson: Sea of Monsters	Mr. D / Dionysus		
2013	The Fifth Estate	James Boswell		
2013	The Hunger Games: Catching Fire	Caesar Flickerman		
2013	Some Velvet Morning	Fred		
2014	The Wind Rises	Giovanni Battista Caproni	Voice; English dub	
2014	Mr. Peabody & Sherman	Leonardo da Vinci	Voice	
2014	Muppets Most Wanted	Ivan, The Guard	Cameo	
2014	Transformers: Age of Extinction	Joshua Joyce		
2014	Wild Card	"Baby"		
2014	A Little Chaos	Philippe I, Duke of Orléans		
2014	The Hunger Games: Mockingjay – Part 1	Caesar Flickerman		
2015	Larry Gaye: Renegade Male Flight Attendant	Publishing Executive		
2015	Spotlight	Mitchell Garabedian		
2015	The Hunger Games: Mockingjay – Part 2	Caesar Flickerman		
2017	Final Portrait	None	Writer and director only	
2017	Beauty and the Beast	Maestro Cadenza	also voice	
2017	Transformers: The Last Knight	Merlin		
2017	The Children Act	Jack Maye		
2017	Submission	Ted Swenson		
2018	Show Dogs	Philippe	Voice	
2018	Patient Zero	The Professor		
2018	A Private War	Tony Shaw		
2018	Night Hunter	Commissioner Harper		
2019	The Silence	Hugh Andrews		
2020	Worth	Charles Wolf		
2020	Supernova	Tusker		
2020	The Witches	Mr. Stringer		
2021	Jolt	Ivan Munchin		
2021	The King's Man	U.S. Ambassador Chester King		
2022	Whitney Houston: I Wanna Dance with Somebody	Clive Davis		
2024	Conclave	Cardinal Aldo Bellini		
2025	The Electric State	Ethan Skate		
2025	Fountain of Youth	The Elder	Cameo	
2026	The Devil Wears Prada 2	Nigel Kipling		
2026	Masterplan	Roger		

Key
†	Denotes films that have not yet been released

== Television ==
Year	Title	Role	Notes	Ref.
1987	Crime Story	Zack Lowman	Episode: "The Battle of Las Vegas"	
1987	Kojak: The Price of Justice	1st Tenant	Television film	
1988	The Street	Arthur Scolari	Unknown episodes	
1988	Miami Vice	Steven DeMarco	Episode: "Baby Blues"	
1987–1988	Miami Vice	Frank Mosca	2 episodes	
1988	The Equalizer	Assemblyman Phillip Wingate	Episode: "The Last Campaign"	
1988–1989	Wiseguy	Rick Pinzolo	5 episodes	
1989–1990	Thirtysomething	Karl Draconis	2 episodes	
1990	Revealing Evidence: Stalking the Honolulu Stranger	Detective Patrick McGuire	Television film	
1990	Lifestories	Art Conforti	Episode: "Art Conforti"	
1991	Equal Justice	Detective Frank Mirelli	3 episodes	
1995–1996	Murder One	Richard Cross	Main role	
1998	Winchell	Walter Winchell	Television film	
2000	Bull	Hunter Lasky	5 episodes	
2001	Conspiracy	Adolf Eichmann	Television film	
2002	Gene Kelly: Anatomy of a Dancer	The Narrator	American Masters documentary	
2004	Frasier	Morrie	Voice; episode: "Frasier-Lite"	
2006	Monk	David Ruskin	Episode: "Mr. Monk and the Actor"	
2006	3 lbs	Douglas Hanson	Main role	
2007–2008	ER	Kevin Moretti	10 episodes	
2012	30 Rock	Henry Warren Chang	Episode: "Alexis Goodlooking and the Case of the Missing Whisky"	
2012	Robot Chicken	Rich Uncle Pennybags	Voice; episode: "Butchered in Burbank"	
2013	American Dad!	Lorenzo	Voice; episode: "Permanent Record Wrecker"	
2014–2020	BoJack Horseman	Herb Kazzaz	Voice; 12 episodes	
2015	Fortitude	DCI Eugene Morton	9 episodes	
2015	The Italian Americans	The Narrator	4 episodes	
2015	Peter & Wendy	Captain James Hook	Television film	
2017	Feud: Bette and Joan	Jack L. Warner	Main role	
2019	Limetown	Emile Haddock	Main role	
2020–2022	Central Park	Bitsy Brandenham	Voice; main role	
2021	Stanley Tucci: Searching for Italy	Himself / Host	Documentary series	
2021–2023	What If...?	Abraham Erskine	Voice; 2 episodes	
2021	La Fortuna	Frank Wild	Main role	
2021–2022	Moley	MishMosh	Main role	
2022	Inside Man	Jefferson Grieff	Miniseries	
2023–	Citadel	Bernard Orlick	13 episodes	
2023	Be My Guest	Himself	Episode: "Stanley Tucci"	
2025	Tucci in Italy	Himself / Host	Documentary series	

== Video games ==
Year	Title	Voice role	Ref.
2005	Robots	Herb Copperbottom	

== Theatre ==
Year	Title	Role	Venue	Ref.
1982	The Queen and the Rebels	Soldier	Plymouth Theatre, Broadway	
1983	The Misanthrope	Du Bois	Circle in the Square Theatre, Broadway	
1984	Brighton Beach Memoirs	Stanley Jerome	Alvin Theatre, Broadway	
1985	The Iceman Cometh	Rocky Pioggi - Don Parritt	Lunt-Fontaine Theatre, Broadway	
1986	Execution of Justice	Various roles	Virginia Theatre, Broadway	
1993	Scapin	Scapin	CSC Theatre, Off-Broadway	
2002–2003	Frankie and Johnny in the Clair de Lune	Johnny	Belasco Theatre, Broadway	

Source: Playbill and Internet Broadway Database
