= Rosamond Young =

Rosamond Young may refer to:

- Roz Young (1912–2005), American author
- Rosamond Young Chapin (1895–1984), American soprano
