= Richard Sipe =

American psychotherapist and former priest

Aquinas Walter Richard Sipe (December 11, 1932 – August 8, 2018) was an American psychotherapist and former Catholic priest who wrote six books about Catholicism, clerical sexual abuse in the Catholic Church and clerical celibacy.

== Biography ==
Born in Robbinsdale, Minnesota, Sipe was formerly a Benedictine monk from 1952 to 1970 at Saint John's Abbey in Collegeville, Minnesota.

Sipe was also a certified clinical mental health counselor, trained specifically to treat Catholic priests. He practiced psychotherapy, "taught on the faculties of Major Catholic Seminaries and colleges, lectured in medical schools, and served as a consultant and expert witness in both civil and criminal cases involving the sexual abuse of minors by Catholic priests".

During his training and therapies, he conducted a 25-year ethnographic study published in 1990 about the sexual behavior of Catholic celibates, in which he found more than half had sexual relationships.

Sipe was a witness in more than 57 lawsuits, testifying on behalf of victims of child sexual abuse by Catholic priests.

=== Research in Burlington diocese ===
In a May 2009 study, Sipe found that there were extensive problems in the sexual behavior of Burlington, Vermont, Catholic clergy. He examined the records of 102 priests "whose records were available" between 1950 and 2002. He claimed that, of this group, 23 priests were sexually involved with children under age 13, 15 were reported for involvement with married women and 19 were said to have had sexual relationships with adult men. He asserted that 49 could be said to have a homosexual orientation.

=== Research on homosexuality ===
A number of small-scale studies by Sipe and others have found no evidence that homosexuals are more likely to break the vow of celibacy than heterosexuals.

=== Death ===
Sipe died on August 8, 2018, of multiple organ failure in La Jolla, California, at age 85.

== Personal life ==
In 1970, after receiving a dispensation from his vows as a priest, Sipe married a former nun, Marianne; they had a son.

== In popular media ==
Sipe participated in 12 documentaries on celibacy and priest sexual abuse aired by HBO, BBC, and other networks in the United States, United Kingdom, and France, and was widely interviewed by media, including CNN, ABC, NBC, CNBC, The New York Times, the Los Angeles Times, People magazine, Newsweek and USA Today. On January 21, 1995, he made an extended appearance on a special edition of the British television discussion program After Dark, alongside Garret FitzGerald and Sinéad O'Connor, among others.

== In popular culture ==
Sipe's research and his book Sex, Priests and Power are depicted in Tom McCarthy's 2015 film Spotlight as crucial in the Boston Globe's Pulitzer Prize–winning 2002 investigation of predatory priests and the decades-long cover-up of their crimes by the Archdiocese of Boston. The 1995 book is shown onscreen in its bright-red-covered hardback edition when the investigative team meet the first victim, Phil Saviano, the founder of the New England chapter of SNAP. As a favor to McCarthy, actor Richard Jenkins performed uncredited as Sipe's voice in three phone calls, each based on real conversations with Spotlight reporters.

== Books by Sipe ==
- Courage at Three AM (a book of poetry), FriesenPress, August 3, 2017, 72 pages
- A Secret World: sexuality and the search for celibacy, Routledge, 1990, ISBN 978-0876305850, 324 pages
- Sex, Priests, and Power: anatomy of a crisis, Routledge Mental Health, 1995, ISBN 0-87630-769-1, 220 pages
- Celibacy: A Way of Loving, Living, and Serving, Liguori Publications, 1st edition (May 1996), ISBN 978-0892438747, 197 pages
- Psychiatry, Ministry, and Pastoral Counseling - Paperback – March 1, 1984 ISBN 978-0814613245, 384 pages
- Celibacy in Crisis: A Secret World Revisited, Brunner-Routledge, New York and Hove 2003, ISBN 978-0415944731, 368 pages
- Living the Celibate Life: A Search for Models and Meaning, Liguori (November 2, 2004), ISBN 978-0764810985, 192 pages
- The Serpent and the Dove: celibacy in literature and life, Greenwood Publishing Group, 2007, ISBN 0313347255, 262 pages.
- Abuse by Priests: Why? (Audio Cassette)

== See also ==
- James F. Colaianni
- Catholic Church sex abuse cases in the United States
