= Primetime Emmy Award for Outstanding Cinematography for a Nonfiction Program =

Television award category

- Awarded for: Outstanding Cinematography for a Nonfiction Program
- Country: United States
- Presented by: Academy of Television Arts & Sciences
- Currently held by: Ocean with David Attenborough (2026)
- Website: emmys.com

The Primetime Emmy Award for Outstanding Cinematography for a Nonfiction Program is awarded to one television documentary or nonfiction series each year.

In the following list, the first titles listed in gold are the winners; those not in gold are nominees, which are listed in alphabetical order. The years given are those in which the ceremonies took place:

== Winners and nominations ==
=== 1970s ===
Year	Program	Episode	Nominees	Network
1978	Outstanding Achievement in Coverage of Special Events - Individuals (Note: As a juried award, nominees had to garner 50% approval to win the award. The nominee did not meet the benchmark and no award was given.)			
1978	The 29th Annual Emmy Awards		Rodger Harbaugh	NBC

=== 1980s ===
Year	Program	Episode	Nominees	Network
1980	Outstanding Individual Achievement - Informational Program (Note: As a juried award, nominees had to garner 50% approval to win the award.)			
1980	Mysteries of the Sea		Bryan Anderson, Bob Elfstrom and Al Giddings	ABC
1981	Outstanding Individual Achievement - Creative Technical Crafts (Note: As a juried award, nominees had to garner 50% approval to win the award. The nominees did not meet the benchmark and no award was given.)			
1981	The Body Human: The Bionic Breakthrough		John L. Marlow	CBS
1982	Outstanding Individual Achievement - Informational Programming (Note: As a juried award, nominees had to garner 50% approval to win the award. The nominees did not meet the benchmark and no award was given.)			
1982	Great Movie Stunts: Raiders of the Lost Ark		Gil Hubbs and Phillip Schuman	CBS

=== 1990s ===
Year	Program	Episode	Nominees	Network
1992	Outstanding Individual Achievement - Informational Programming (Note: As a juried award, nominees had to garner 50% approval to win the award.)			
1992	Millennium: Tribal Wisdom and the Modern World	"Strange Relations"	Michael Boland and Vic Sarin	PBS
1993	Outstanding Individual Achievement - Informational Programming (Note: As a juried award, nominees had to garner 50% approval to win the award.)			
1993	Mysteries Underground (National Geographic)		Lionel Friedberg and Sid Perou	PBS
1995	Outstanding Individual Achievement - Informational Programming (Note: As a juried award, nominees had to garner 50% approval to win the award. No nominee met the benchmark and no award was given.)			
1995	Baseball		Ken Burns, Allen Moore and Buddy Squires	PBS
1995	A Century of Women		Ellen Kuras	TBS
1995	One Survivor Remembers		Andrzej Jeziorek, Erich Roland and Buddy Squires	HBO
1996	Outstanding Individual Achievement - Informational Programming (Note: These programs were nominated as Outstanding Individual Achievement - Informational Programming. As a juried award, nominees had to garner 50% approval to win the award.)			
1996	The Private Life of Plants		Neil Bromhall, Richard Ganniclift, Richard Kirby, Michael Pitts, Tim Shepherd, Gavin Thurston	TBS
1996	The Celluloid Closet		Nancy Schreiber	HBO
1998
1998	America's Endangered Species: Don't Say Goodbye		Nick Caloyianis, Richard Chisolm, Jerry Cotts, Jon Else, Paul Goldsmith and Buddy Squires	NBC
1998	Wolves at Our Door		Jim Dutcher	Discovery
1998	4 Little Girls		Ellen Kuras	HBO
1999
1999	The Farm: Angola, USA		Samuel Henriques and Bob Perrin	A&E
1999	Avalanche: The White Death		Richard Chisolm, Skip Gray, Cory Taylor and Erich Volkstorf	NBC

=== 2000s ===
Year	Program	Episode	Nominees	Network
2000
2000	Raising the Mammoth		Robert Pauly and Didier Portal	Discovery
2000	American Experience	"New York: A Documentary Film"	Allen Moore and Budyd Squires	PBS
2000	Children in War		Alan Raymond	HBO
2001
2001	Land of the Mammoth		John Davey, Didier Portal and Noel Smart	Discovery
2001	Half Past Autumn: The Life and Works of Gordon Parks		Henry Adebonojo, Greg Andracke, Hiro Narita and Brian Sewell	HBO
2001	Jazz	"A Masterpiece by Midnight"	Ken Burns and Buddy Squires	PBS
2001	Living Dolls: The Making of a Child Beauty Queen		Sandra Chandler	HBO
2001	Survivor	"A Honeymoon or Not"	Len Beard, Tom Cowan, Richard Dallett, Leighton De Barros, Michael Dillon, Scott Duncan, Randall Einhorn, Raj Gibson, Tom Gleeson, Jim Harrington, Mark Hryma, Mark "Ninja" Lynch, Brian Marleau, Ryan Mooney, Paul Moss, Michael Murray, Peter Pescell, Peter Pilafian, Matthew Sohn, John Tattersall, Martin Unversaw and Fed Wetherbee	CBS
2002
2002	The Blue Planet	"Seas of Life: Ocean World"	Doug Allan, Simon Carroll, Bob Cranston, Mike deGruy, Yuri Farrant, Tom Fitz, Mark Wolf, Simon King, Charles Maxwell, Ian McCarthy, Didier Noirot, Michael Pitts, Rick Rosenthal, Peter Scoones and Paul Stewart	Discovery
2002	American Experience	"Ansel Adams: A Documentary Film"	Michael Chin, Jon Else and Buddy Squires	PBS
2002	The Human Face with John Cleese		Rajesh Bedi, Bill Broomfield, Patrick Duval, John Halliday, Chris Hartley, John Hooper, John Johnson, Richard Numeroff, Allan Palmer, Jeremy Pollard and Nancy Schiesari	TLC
2002	In Memorian: New York City, 9/11/01		Greg Andracke, Jeb Bergh, Edward Marritz and Bob Richman	HBO
2002	9/11		James Hanlon, Gédéon Naudet and Jules Naudet	CBS
2003	Nova	"Mountain of Ice"	John Armstrong	PBS
2003	American Experience	"Daughter from Danang"	Vicente Franco	PBS
2003	Expedition: Bismarck		Vince Pace, Christopher Titus King, Neve Cunningham and D.J. Roller	Discovery
2003	Journeys with George		Alexandra Pelosi	HBO
2003	Survivor	"The Importance of Being Earnest"	Mark 'Ninja' Lynch, Mark Hryma, Len Beard, Derek Carver, Paulo Castillo, Tony Croll, Richard Dallett, Michael Dean, Leighton De Barros, Randall Einhorn, Russell Fill, Kevin Garrison, Jim Harrington, Michael Murray, Alan Pierce, Matt Sohn, Jeffery Taylor, John Tattersall, Martin Unversaw and Jeff Watt	CBS
2004	The Blues	"The Soul of a Man"	Lisa Rinzler	PBS
2004	The Amazing Race	"I Could Never Have Been Prepared for What I'm Looking at Right Now"	Peter Wery, John Armstrong, Tom Cunningham, Chip Goebert, Per Larsson, Loy Norrix, Dave Ross, Uri Sharon, Scott Shelley, Brett Smith, Jeff Taylor and Scott Walker	CBS
2004	The Apprentice	"Wheeling & Dealing"	Matt Sohn, Mark Hryma, Erica Shusha, Michael Dean, German Abarca Jr., Russell Fill, Jim Harrington, Peter Wery, Jeff Watt, Mande Whitaker, Joshua Mayes, Jorge Alves Jr., Vince Monteleone, Mark 'Ninja' Lynch, David Charles Sullivan, Tony Croll, Rodney Chauvin, Kary D'Alessandro, Tom Magill and David Park	NBC
2004	Jockey		Kate Davis	HBO
2004	Survivor	"Beg, Barter and Steal"	Mark 'Ninja' Lynch, Michael Murray, Mark Hryma, Derek Lovie, David Parkinson, Michael Applebaum, Jim Harrington, Alan Pierce, Peter Pilafian, George Waterman, Michael Yelseth, Derek Carver, Vince Monteleone, Jeff Watt, Peter Wery, Kevin Garrison, Bennie Cronje, John Tattersall, Russell Fill, Paul Moss, David Chapiro, Paulo Castillo and Justin Evans	CBS
2005	Death in Gaza		James Miller (posthumously)	HBO
2005	The Amazing Race	"We're Moving Up the Food Chain"	Per Larsson, John Armstrong, Sylvestre Campe, Tom Cunningham, Chip Goebert, Lucas Mertes, Dave Ross, Uri Sharon, Scott Shelley, Mark Walker and Scott Walker	CBS
2005	The Contender	"The Final Four"	Michael Murray, Michael Koepke, Scott Acosta, John Armstrong, Paulo Castillo, Rodney Chauvin, Scott Duncan, Russell Fill, Kevin Garrison, Rob Landry, Vince Monteleone, Martin Palafox, Alan Pierce, Jeremy Schneider, Therese Sherman, Raphael Smadja, Chris S. Smith, John Tattersall, Matt Valentine, Jeff Watt, Tyne M. Whitmore and Mande Whitaker	NBC
2005	Living with Wolves		Jim Dutcher	Discovery
2005	Survivor	"This Has Never Happened Before"	Mark Hryma, Michael Murray, Mark 'Ninja' Lynch, Lance Milbrand, David Parkinson, Justine Evans, Michael Yelseth, Jeffery Taylor, Kent Harvey, Michael Applebaum, Derek Carver, Lee Doig, Jeff Watt, Peter Wery, Matthias Hoffmann, David Chapiro, Bennie Cronje, Leighton De Barros, Russell Fill, Kevin Garrison, Paul Moss, John Tattersall and Paulo Castillo	CBS
2006	Baghdad ER		Jon Alpert and Matthew O'Neill	HBO
2006	All Aboard! Rosie's Family Cruise		Maryse Alberti, Sandra Chandler and Beth Wichterich	HBO
2006	Children of Beslan		Dirk Nel	HBO
2006	I Have Tourette's but Tourette's Doesn't Have Me		Buddy Squires	HBO
2006	Rome: Engineering an Empire		Jeremiah Crowell	History
2007	Planet Earth	"Pole to Pole"	Doug Allan, Martyn Colbeck, Paul Stewart, Simon King, Michael Kelem and Wade Fairley	Discovery
2007	Deadliest Catch	"The Unforgiving Sea"	Doug Stanley, Zac McFarlane, Don Bland, Cameron Glendenning, Todd Stanley and Eric Lange	Discovery
2007	Meerkat Manor	"Family Affair"	John Brown and Robin Smith	Animal Planet
2007	This American Life	"God's Close-Up"	Adam Beckman	Showtime
2007	When the Levees Broke: A Requiem in Four Acts		Cliff Charles	HBO
2008	Deadliest Catch	"No Mercy"	Cinematography Team	Discovery
2008	Autism: The Musical		Tricia Regan	HBO
2008	Ice Road Truckers	"Ready to Roll"	Cinematography Team	History
2008	Meerkat Manor	"Journey's End"	Ted Giffords, John Waters and Ralph Bower	Animal Planet
2008	This American Life	"Escape"	Adam Beckman	Showtime
2009	Anthony Bourdain: No Reservations	"Laos"	Todd Liebler and Zach Zamboni	Travel
2009	Deadliest Catch	"Stay Focused or Die"	Cinematography Team	Discovery
2009	Expedition Africa	"Lost in Africa"	Cinematography Team	History
2009	This American Life	"John Smith"	Adam Beckman	Showtime
2009	Whale Wars	"Nothing's Ideal"	Cinematography Team	Animal Planet

=== 2010s ===
Year	Program	Episode	Nominees	Network
2010	Life	"Challenges of Life"	Cinematography Team	Discovery
2010	America: The Story of Us	"Division"	Dirk Nel	History
2010	Deadliest Catch	"No Second Chances"	Cinematography Team	Discovery
2010	The National Parks: America's Best Idea	"The Scripture of Nature"	Buddy Squires	PBS
2010	Whale Wars	"The Stuff of Nightmares"	Cinematography Team	Animal Planet
2011	Anthony Bourdain: No Reservations	"Haiti"	Todd Liebler and Zach Zamboni	Travel
2011	American Masters	"Troubadours: Carole King/James Taylor & The Rise of the Singer-Songwriter"	Nicola Marsh and Arlene Nelson	PBS
2011	Gasland		Josh Fox	HBO
2011	Gettysburg		Michael Snyman	History
2011	If God Is Willing and da Creek Don't Rise		Cliff Charles	HBO
2011	Whale Wars	"To the Ends of the Earth"	Cinematography Team	Animal Planet
2012	Frozen Planet	"Ends of the Earth"	Cinematography Team	Discovery
2012	Anthony Bourdain: No Reservations	"Mozambique"	Todd Liebler and Zach Zamboni	Travel
2012	George Harrison: Living in the Material World		Cinematography Team	HBO
2012	Prohibition	"A Nation of Drunkards"	Buddy Squires	PBS
2012	Whale Wars	"Race to Save Lives"	Cinematography Team	Animal Planet
2013	Anthony Bourdain: Parts Unknown	"Myanmar"	Todd Liebler, Zach Zamboni and Morgan Fallon	CNN
2013	Ethel		Buddy Squires	HBO
2013	Manhunt: The Inside Story of the Hunt for Bin Laden		Frank-Peter Lehmann and Erich Roland	HBO
2013	Mea Maxima Culpa: Silence in the House of God		Lisa Rinzler	HBO
2013	The Men Who Built America	"A New War Begins"	Richard Lopez	History
2014	The Square		Jehane Noujaim, Muhammad Hamdy, Ahmed Hassan and Cressida Trew	Netflix
2014	Anthony Bourdain: Parts Unknown	"Punjab"	Todd Liebler and Zach Zamboni	CNN
2014	Anthony Bourdain: Parts Unknown	"Tokyo"	Morgan Fallon	CNN
2014	Cosmos: A Spacetime Odyssey	"Standing Up in the Milky Way"	Bill Pope	Fox
2014	Vice	"Greenland Is Melting/Bonded Labor"	Jake Burghart and Jerry Ricciotti	HBO
2015	Virunga		Franklin Dow	Netflix
2015	Citizenfour		Laura Poitras	HBO
2015	Going Clear: Scientology and the Prison of Belief		Samuel Painter	HBO
2015	The Jinx: The Life and Deaths of Robert Durst	"Chapter 2: Poor Little Rich Boy"	Marc Smerling	HBO
2015	Kurt Cobain: Montage of Heck		Jim Whitaker	HBO
2016	Cartel Land		Matthew Heineman and Matt Porwoll	A&E
2016	Anthony Bourdain: Parts Unknown	"Cuba"	Todd Liebler and Zach Zamboni	CNN
2016	He Named Me Malala		Samuel Painter	Nat Geo
2016	Mapplethorpe: Look at the Pictures		Mario Panagiotopoulos and Huy Truong	HBO
2016	What Happened, Miss Simone?		Igor Martinovic and Rachel Morrison	Netflix
2017	Planet Earth II	"Islands"	Cinematography Team	BBC America
2017	Anthony Bourdain: Parts Unknown	"Rome"	Todd Liebler and Zach Zamboni	CNN
2017	Chef's Table	"Virgilio Martinez"	Will Basanta	Netflix
2017	O.J.: Made in America	"Part 4"	Nick Higgins	ESPN
2017	Planet Earth II	"Cities"	Cinematography Team	BBC America
2017	13th		Hans Charles and Kira Kelly	Netflix
2018
2018	Jane		Ellen Kuras and Hugo van Lawick	Nat Geo
2018	Anthony Bourdain: Parts Unknown	"Lagos"	Morgan Fallon, Jerry Risius and Tarik Hameedi	CNN
2018	Blue Planet II	"The Deep"	Gavin Thurston	BBC America
2018	Blue Planet II	"One Ocean"	Ted Giffords and Roger Munns	BBC America
2018	Chef's Table	"Corrado Assenza"	Adam Bricker	Netflix
2019
2019	Free Solo		Jimmy Chin, Clair Popkin and Mikey Schaefer	Nat Geo
2019	Anthony Bourdain: Parts Unknown	"Bhutan"	Morgan Fallon, Todd Liebler and Zach Zamboni	CNN
2019	Our Planet	"Coastal Seas"	Doug Anderson and Gavin Thurston	Netflix
2019	Our Planet	"Jungles"	Alastair MacEwen and Matt Aeberhard	Netflix
2019	Our Planet	"One Planet"	Jamie McPherson and Roger Horrocks	Netflix

=== 2020s ===
Year	Program	Episode	Nominees	Network
2020
2020	The Cave		Muhammed Khair Al Shami, Ammar Suleiman and Mohammed Eyad	Nat Geo
2020	American Factory		Erick Stoll and Aubrey Keith	Netflix
2020	Apollo 11		Buzz Aldrin and Michael Collins	CNN
2020	Becoming		Nadia Hallgren	Netflix
2020	Sea of Shadows		Richard Ladkani	Nat Geo
2020	Serengeti	"Rebirth"	Richard Jones, Michael W. Richards, Warren Samuels and Matthew Goodman	Discovery
2021
2021	David Attenborough: A Life on Our Planet		Gavin Thurston	Netflix
2021	City So Real	"Blood Sport"	Jackson James and Steve James	Nat Geo
2021	Rebuilding Paradise		Lincoln Else	Nat Geo
2021	Dick Johnson Is Dead		Kirsten Johnson and John Wakayama Carey	Netflix
2021	The Social Dilemma		John Behrens and Jonathan Pope	Netflix
2021	Secrets of the Whales	"Ocean Giants"	Brian Armstrong, Hayes Baxley and Andy Mitchell	Disney+
2022
2022	100 Foot Wave	"Chapter IV: Dancing with God"	Mike Prickett and Laurent Pujol	HBO
2022	The Andy Warhol Diaries	"Collab: Andy & Basquiat"	Wolfgang Held	Netflix
2022	McCartney 3,2,1	"These Things Bring You Together"	Stuart Winecoff	Hulu
2022	Our Great National Parks	"Chilean Patagonia"	Christiaan Muñoz-Salas and Ignacio Walker	Netflix
2022	Stanley Tucci: Searching for Italy	"Venice"	Andrew Muggleton	CNN
2022	We Feed People		Kris Kaczor	Disney+
2023
2023	100 Foot Wave	"Chapter VI: Force Majeure"	Antoine Chicoye, Mikey Corker, Vincent Kardasik, Alexandre Lesbats, Chris Smith, Laurent Pujol, João Vidinha and Michael Darrigade	HBO
2023	Secrets of the Elephants	"Desert"	Toby Strong, James Boon and Bob Poole	Nat Geo
2023	The 1619 Project	"Justice"	Jerry Henry	Hulu
2023	Stanley Tucci: Searching for Italy	"Calabria"	Andrew Muggleton	CNN
2023	Still: A Michael J. Fox Movie		C. Kim Miles, Clair Popkin and Julia Liu	Apple TV+
2023	The Territory		Alex Pritz and Tangãi Uru-eu-wau-wa	Nat Geo
2024
2024	Girls State		Laura Hudock, Laela Kilbourn, Daniel Carter, Erynn Patrick Lamont, Keri Oberly, Thorsten Thielow and Martina Radwan	Apple TV+
2024	Beckham	"The Kick"	Tim Cragg	Netflix
2024	Jim Henson Idea Man		Igor Martinovic and Vanja Cernjul	Disney+
2024	Our Planet II	"Chapter 1: World on the Move"	Brad Bestelink and Kyle McBurnie	Netflix
2024	Planet Earth III	"Extremes"	Luke Nelson and John Shier	BBC America
2025
2025	100 Foot Wave	"Chapter III: Cortes Bank"	Michael Darrigade, Vincent Kardasik, Alexandre Lesbats, Laurent Pujol, Karl Sandrock and Chris Smith	HBO
2025	Chef's Table	"Jamie Oliver"	Adam Bricker	Netflix
2025	Ren Faire	"Daddy's Dyin', Who's Got the Will?"	Nate Hurtsellers	HBO
2025	Tucci in Italy	"Tuscany"	Matt Ball	Nat Geo
2025	Will & Harper		Zoë White	Netflix
2026
2026	Ocean with David Attenborough		Doug Anderson and Toby Strong	Nat Geo
2026	My Mom Jayne: A Film by Mariska Hargitay		Tony Hardmon	HBO
2026	The Tale of Silyan		Jean Dakar	Nat Geo
2026	Tucci in Italy	"Le Marche"	Matt Ball	Nat Geo
2026	The Yogurt Shop Murders	"The End of Wondering"	Justin Zweifach and Christopher LaMarca	HBO

== Programs with multiple awards ==
3 wins

- 100 Foot Wave

== Programs with multiple nominations ==
7 nominations

- Anthony Bourdain: Parts Unknown

4 nominations

- Whale Wars

3 nominations

- American Experience
- Chef's Table
- 100 Foot Wave
- Our Planet
- This American Life

2 nominations

- Blue Planet II
- Meerkat Manor
- Planet Earth II
- Stanley Tucci: Searching for Italy
- Tucci in Italy
