= Rosamond Young Chapin =

American soprano

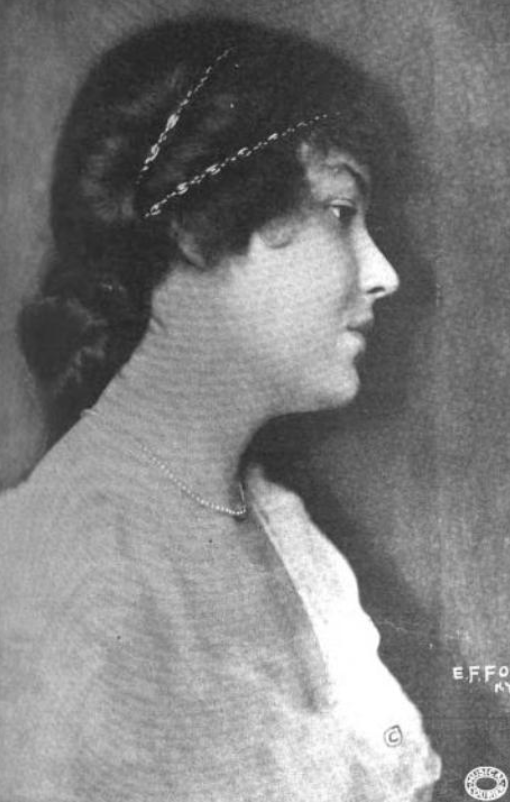
- Rosamond Young, from a 1915 publication
- Born: July 17, 1895; Boston, Massachusetts
- Died: July 30, 1984 (aged 89); Beverly, Massachusetts
- Occupations: Opera singer, producer, arts administrator, cook
- Relatives: Roderick MacLeish (son-in-law); Eric MacLeish (grandson)

Rosamond Young Chapin (July 17, 1895 – July 30, 1984) was an American singer, theatrical producer and arts administrator. Her personal relationship with Boston Symphony Orchestra conductor Karl Muck drew her into scandal during World War I. Later, she and her husband created and directed the New Boston Opera Company and the New Boston Music Festival in the 1930s and 1940s. She was known as a cook and businesswoman in the 1950s.

== Early life and education ==
Rosamond Young was from Dorchester, Massachusetts, the daughter of Frank Linnaeus Young and Minnie Ella Jones Young. Her father was in manufacturing. She graduated from Milton Academy. She trained at the New England Conservatory of Music, and at the von Ende School of Music with Adrienne Remenyi.

== Career ==
Young was a concert singer. She made her professional debut as a soprano with the Boston Symphony Orchestra at age 19. She had an affair with Boston Symphony Orchestra conductor Karl Muck. Muck's incriminating letters to her were part of the evidence gathered for his 1918 arrest (and subsequent deportation), and they were published in The Washington Post, with Young's name changed to "Adele Marvin".

Chapin continued her singing career, including at least three performances at Katherine Frazier's Cummington School of the Arts. A 1937 Boston Globe reviewer described her performance critically: "At times her notes could scarcely be heard above the orchestra. At others she had to force her voice so that her upper tones sounded thin and constricted."

Chapin and her husband created and directed the New Boston Opera Company and the New Boston Music Festival in the 1930s and 1940s, promoting American opera singers and English-language texts. She made English translations of opera libretti, including Mozart's Abduction from the Seraglio (1942), and scenes from Wagner's Die Walküre (1957). Eleanor Roosevelt mentioned Chapin in her newspaper column "My Day" in 1940, saying "I feel sure that there must be people in this country interested in her idea to promote American artists here."

Chapin produced and directed shows at Jacob's Pillow Dance Festival, including a 1942 all-musical program, and Tristan and Isolde (1947). In 1947, she sued singer Marie Powers, who was double-booked at Jacob's Pillow and in a Broadway show. By 1947, the Chapins were running the New Boston Inn in the Berkshires, and she managed the inn's kitchen and musical offerings. She also shared her recipes in newspaper features. In 1951, she went to Germany to negotiate with the Wagner family for permission to establish a Richard Wagner Festival Playhouse in the United States.

== Personal life ==
Young married lawyer and businessman Russell Chapin in 1925. They had two daughters, Isolde and Diana. Diana Chapin married writer Roderick MacLeish in 1950. Rosamond Young Chapin died in 1984, at the age of 89, in Beverly, Massachusetts. Lawyer Eric MacLeish is her grandson.
