= Eric MacLeish =

American lawyer

Roderick "Eric" MacLeish (born October 31, 1952) is a lawyer known for representing hundreds of sexual abuse victims in the Boston area during the Catholic priest sexual abuse scandal while he was a Boston-based partner of Greenberg Traurig, a Miami-based law firm. His clients included those abused by Paul Shanley.

== Abuse cases ==
MacLeish started representing victims of clergy abuse in 1992 in a case involving former Fall River, Massachusetts priest James Porter, who was accused of molesting 68 children in southeastern Massachusetts and ultimately sent to prison.

After the priest abuse cases, MacLeish stopped practicing law. He returned in 2011 and took on cases involving inadequate patient care at Bridgewater State Hospital, where patients had been sent to prolonged solitary confinement in violation of state law. MacLeish won a preliminary injunction in 2014 and subsequently settled a class action lawsuit.

In 2015, MacLeish reconnected with a former sex abuse client who had been sexually abused at St. George's School, which MacLeish had attended. MacLeish and his client attempted to have the school name the abuser, former athletic trainer Al Gibbs, and send a letter to alums. When the school resisted, the client went public in The Boston Globe. More victims came forward, and the school ultimately agreed to a well-publicized settlement.

MacLeish has continued to represent victims of sexual abuse at private schools, camps, and other institutions since the St. George's case. Commencing in 2019, MacLeish began representing victims of domestic violence in restraining order cases without charging a fee.

In January 2002, MacLeish started the Massachusetts 9/11 Fund, the only charity in New England to assist those who had lost loved ones in the September 11 attacks. Under MacLeish's leadership, the Fund raised millions of dollars for families, arranged social events for families, and provided programs ranging from grief counseling to financial planning. The Fund still exists as of 2023, and MacLeish spoke at the Massachusetts State House on the fifteenth anniversary of 9/11.

== Education ==
A graduate of Vassar College, he went on to graduate cum laude from the Boston University School of Law in 1978.

== Career ==
MacLeish clerked for U.S. District Court Judge Joseph L. Tauro. From 2002 to 2004, he served as lead counsel for his law firm, which represented over 300 individuals in the Boston priest scandal. He also represented a claimant sexually abused by a Milton Academy teacher.

He has been representing people who allege sexual abuse at St. George's School in Middletown, Rhode Island.

The National Law Journal once name him one of the top trial attorneys in the US. In 2016, Massachusetts Lawyers Weekly named MacLeish a "Lawyer of the Year" for his work on behalf of sexual abuse victims in private schools.

He began teaching at Plymouth State University in 2006 before returning to the practice of law in 2011.

== Personal life ==
His father was political commentator Roderick MacLeish and he has a sister, Sumner MacLeish. His grandmother was opera singer and translator Rosamond Young Chapin.

His former psychologist lost her professional license after having a sexual relationship with him.

== Popular culture ==
In the movie Spotlight, MacLeish was portrayed by Billy Crudup. He has claimed he was portrayed inaccurately.
