= Roderick MacLeish =

American journalist and writer

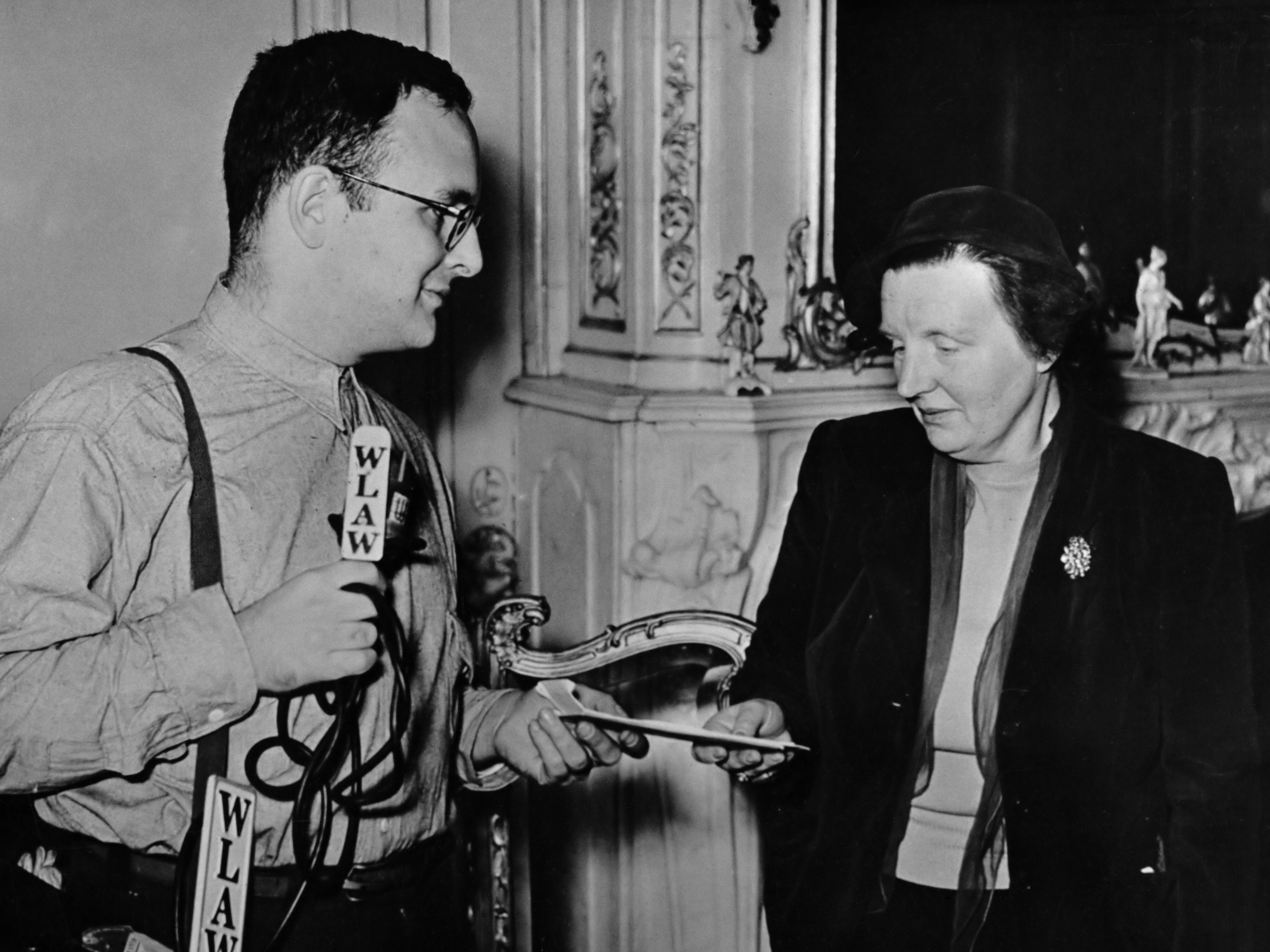
- Roderick MacLeish and Queen Juliana of the Netherlands (1953)
- Born: January 15, 1926; Bryn Mawr, Pennsylvania
- Died: July 1, 2006 (aged 80); Washington, DC
- Education: University of Chicago
- Occupations: Writer, journalist
- Spouse(s): Diana Chapin MacLeish, Doris Inch MacLeish, Jane Krumbhaar MacLeish
- Writing career
- Notable works: The Guilty Bystander (essays), The Sun Stood Still (nonfiction), Prince Ombra (fantasy fiction), The Man Who Wasn't There (fiction)

Roderick MacLeish (January 15, 1926 – July 1, 2006) was an American journalist and writer. Born in Bryn Mawr, Pennsylvania, he grew up in the Chicago suburbs and graduated from the University of Chicago. MacLeish was news director for WBZ radio in Boston in the early 1950s, then helped start the London and Washington, DC, bureaus of Westinghouse Broadcasting, where he was a chief commentator. He later was a commentator for CBS News, National Public Radio, and The Christian Science Monitor. His published books include both nonfiction and fiction. MacLeish was the nephew of poet Archibald MacLeish. Attorney Eric MacLeish is his son. He died in Washington, DC, at the age of 80.

External image
- Roderick MacLeish (center, in levis) as a University of Chicago student. Archival Photographic Files, (apf digital item number apf303034r), Special Collections Research Center, University of Chicago Library.

== Bibliography ==
- A Time of Fear (fiction, 1957)
- The Sun Stood Still: Israel and the Arabs at War (nonfiction, 1967)
- The Guilty Bystander (essays, 1971)
- A City on the River (fiction, 1973)
- Carnaby Rex (paperback title: The Man Who Wasn't There) (fiction, 1976)
- The First Book of Eppe (fiction, 1980)
- Prince Ombra (fantasy fiction, 1982)
- Crossing at Ivalo (fiction, 1990)

Roderick MacLeish wrote a fiction published in GQ magazine in October 1984, page 214 : Th Smartest Dog in the State of Maine a great article! Source: GQ Magazine October 1984

== Sources ==
- Adam Bernstein, "Political Commentator Rod MacLeish, 80" (obituary), The Washington Post, July 4, 2006 at B07.
- Brandie M. Jefferson, "Roderick MacLeish, 80; in fiction and reality, lived a life of adventure" (obituary), The Boston Globe, July 3, 2006.
- "Former NPR Commentator Rod MacLeish Dies", National Public Radio, July 4, 2006.
