= Stanley Tucci =

American actor and author (born 1960)

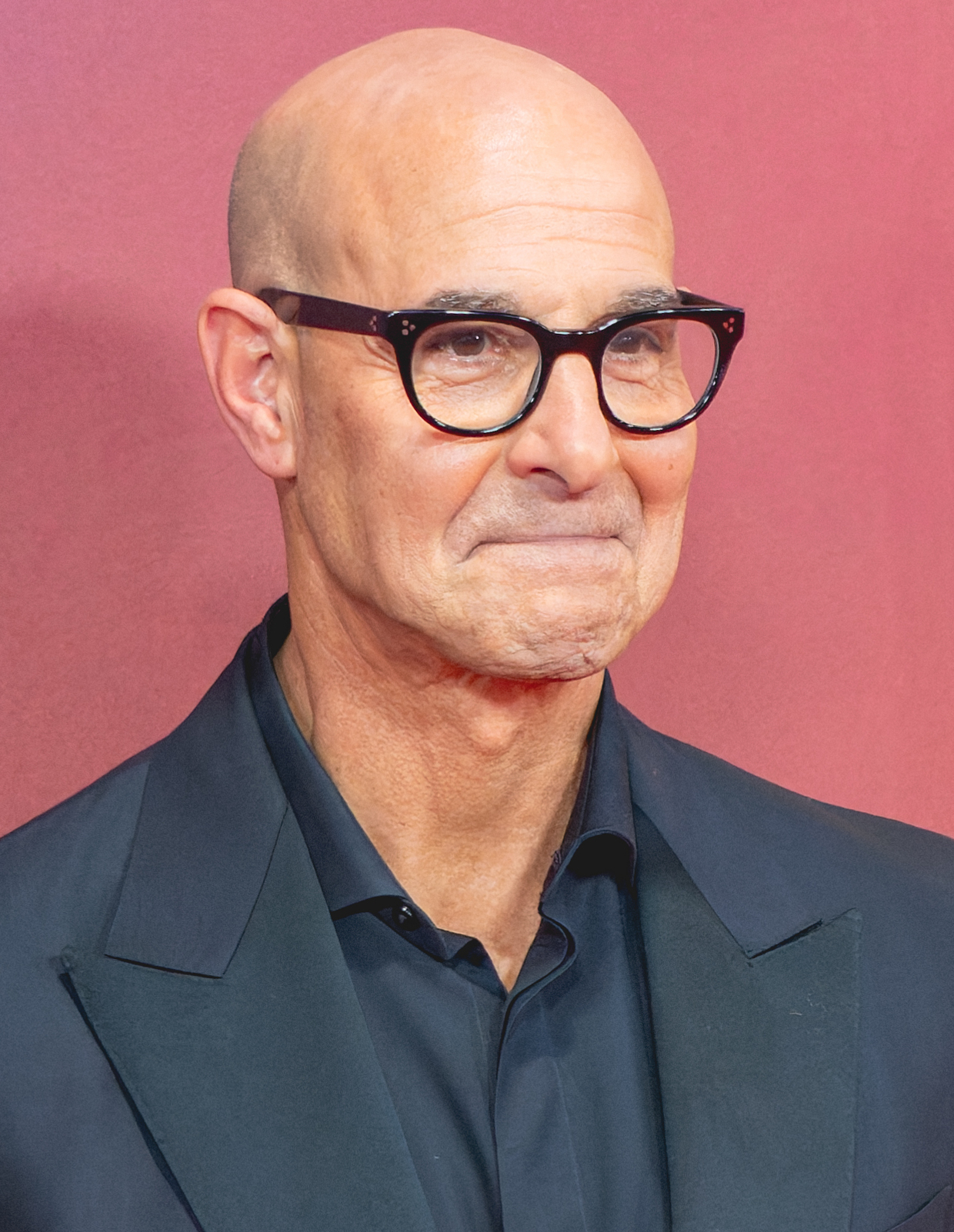
- Tucci in 2024
- Born: Stanley Tucci Jr. November 11, 1960 (age 65); Peekskill, New York, U.S.
- Education: State University of New York, Purchase (BFA)
- Occupations: Actor; producer; director; screenwriter
- Years active: 1982–present
- Works: Full list
- Spouses: Kathryn Spath (m. 1995; died 2009); Felicity Blunt (m. 2012)
- Children: 5
- Relatives: Christine Tucci (sister)
- Awards: Full list

Stanley Tucci Jr. (/ˈtuːtʃi/ TOO-chee, Italian: [ˈtuttʃi]; born November 11, 1960) is an American actor and filmmaker. Widely recognized as a character actor for his work on stage and screen, he has received numerous accolades, including seven Primetime Emmy Awards and two Golden Globe Awards, in addition to nominations for an Academy Award, a BAFTA Award, and a Tony Award.

Tucci made his film debut in John Huston's Prizzi's Honor (1985), before taking supporting roles in films such as Deconstructing Harry (1997), Road to Perdition (2002), and The Terminal (2004). He was nominated for the Academy Award for Best Supporting Actor for playing a sinister neighbor in The Lovely Bones (2009). He also acted in The Devil Wears Prada (2006), Julie & Julia (2009), Burlesque (2010), Easy A (2010), Captain America: The First Avenger (2011), Margin Call (2011), The Hunger Games film series (2012–2015), Transformers films (2014–2017), Spotlight (2015), Supernova (2020), Worth (2021), Whitney Houston: I Wanna Dance with Somebody (2022), Conclave (2024), and The Devil Wears Prada 2 (2026). He made his directorial debut with the comedy Big Night (1996), which he also co-wrote and starred in.

He has starred in numerous television series such as the legal drama Murder One (1995–1997), the medical drama 3 lbs (2006), Ryan Murphy's limited series Feud: Bette & Joan (2017), and the drama Limetown (2018). He played Stanley Kubrick in the HBO film The Life and Death of Peter Sellers (2004). For his portrayal of Walter Winchell in the HBO film Winchell (1998) he received the Primetime Emmy Award for Outstanding Lead Actor in a Miniseries or Movie. From 2020 to 2022, Tucci voiced Bitsy Brandenham in the Apple TV+ animated series Central Park.

From 2021 to 2022, he hosted the CNN food and travel documentary series Stanley Tucci: Searching for Italy for which he won two consecutive Primetime Emmy Awards for Outstanding Hosted Nonfiction Series. He was nominated for a Tony Award for Best Actor in a Play for his role in Frankie and Johnny in the Clair de Lune (2003), and a Grammy Award for narrating the audiobook The One and Only Shrek! (2008).

== Early life and education ==
Tucci was born on November 11, 1960, in Peekskill, New York, and grew up in nearby Katonah, New York. His parents, Joan (née Tropiano), a secretary and writer, and Stanley Tucci Sr. an art teacher at Horace Greeley High School in Chappaqua, New York, both of Italian descent, have distant roots in the town of Marzi in Calabria, Southern Italy. Tucci is the oldest of three children, including his sister, actress Christine Tucci. Screenwriter Joseph Tropiano is a cousin. During the early 1970s, he spent a year living in Florence, Italy.

He attended John Jay High School, in Lewisboro, New York, where he played on the soccer and baseball teams, although his main interest lay in the school's drama club, where he and fellow actor and high school friend Campbell Scott, son of actors George C. Scott and Colleen Dewhurst, gave well-received performances at many of John Jay's drama club productions. Tucci then attended State University of New York at Purchase (SUNY), where he majored in acting and graduated in 1982. Among his classmates at SUNY Purchase was fellow acting student Ving Rhames; it was Tucci who gave Rhames, born Irving, the nickname "Ving".

== Career ==
=== 1982–1995: early roles and Broadway debut ===
In 1982, Tucci earned his Actors' Equity card when actress Colleen Dewhurst, the mother of Tucci's high-school friend, actor Campbell Scott, arranged for the two young men to have parts as soldiers in a Broadway play in which she was co-starring, The Queen and the Rebels which premiered on September 30, 1982. Around this time, Tucci also worked as a model, with his most notable work being a television commercial for Levi's 501 jeans. In 1985, Tucci made his film debut as a soldier in John Huston's black comedy crime film Prizzi's Honor starring Jack Nicholson and Kathleen Turner. During this period, Tucci portrayed minor and supporting roles in a number of films, including the psychological horror film Monkey Shines (1988), the comedy-drama Slaves of New York (1989) and the comedy Fear, Anxiety & Depression (1989).

In 1991, he acted in the biographical drama film Billy Bathgate starring Dustin Hoffman and Nicole Kidman. Here, Tucci portrayed mobster Lucky Luciano. That same year he performed the role of Scapino at the Yale Repertory Theatre in Molière's Scapin. In 1992, Tucci acted in the family comedy Beethoven and the romantic fantasy Prelude to a Kiss. The former spawned a franchise of the same name due to the success of the 1992 film. Tucci continued to take roles in films such as the legal thriller The Pelican Brief (1993) starring Denzel Washington and Julia Roberts, Undercover Blues (1993) starring Kathleen Turner and Dennis Quaid, and the romantic comedy It Could Happen to You (1994) with Nicolas Cage and Bridget Fonda. From 1995 to 1996, Tucci starred in the television series Murder One as the mysterious Richard Cross. Tucci received his first Primetime Emmy Award nomination for his performance in the series, specifically for Outstanding Supporting Actor in a Drama Series. Following disappointing ratings, ABC decided to revamp the series resulting in Tucci's dismissal.

=== 1996–2005: directorial debut and other roles ===
In 1996, Tucci co-wrote and co-directed the comedy-drama film Big Night. Tucci co-wrote the screenplay with his cousin Joseph Tropiano, and directed the film with his friend Campbell Scott. Tucci starred with Tony Shalhoub as two brothers trying to make their authentic Italian restaurant a success at a place and time when spaghetti and meatballs were the height of gastronomic sophistication.

The film premiered at the Sundance Film Festival where it was nominated for the "Grand Jury Prize". Tucci and Tropiano won the Independent Spirit Award for Best First Screenplay for writing the screenplay of the film. The film also featured his sister Christine and their mother, who wrote a cookbook for the film. The film also starred Minnie Driver, Isabella Rossellini, Ian Holm, and Allison Janney. Critic Roger Ebert praised the film, writing: "To some degree this film must represent a break for [Tucci]: He has been in good movies before, but not enough of them...Now here is their labor of love. Their perfect risotto. They include just what is needed and nothing else."

That same year, Tucci also acted in the independent drama The Daytrippers which was written and directed by Greg Mottola. The film also starred Hope Davis, Liev Schreiber, and Parker Posey. The following year, he appeared in Woody Allen's comedy Deconstructing Harry which received an Academy Award for Best Original Screenplay nomination. In 1998, Tucci wrote, directed, co-produced and starred in the comedy film The Impostors. The film starred Tucci and Oliver Platt who play Laurel and Hardy-like comedians who are struggling in the 1930s. The film premiered at the 1998 Cannes Film Festival where it received positive reviews. Shortly thereafter, Tucci starred in the HBO biographical television film Winchell (1998), in which Tucci portrayed columnist Walter Winchell. For his portrayal of Winchell, Tucci won the Primetime Emmy Award for Outstanding Lead Actor in a Limited Series or Movie and the Golden Globe Award for Best Actor – Miniseries or Television Film. Tucci also received a Screen Actors Guild Awards nomination for his performance in the film.

In 1999, he played Robin Goodfellow / Puck in the Michael Hoffman adaptation of A Midsummer Night's Dream. In 2000, Tucci directed, produced and starred in the drama film Joe Gould's Secret, based on a 1964 biographical essay about Gould by The New Yorker reporter Joseph Mitchell. In 2001, Tucci starred in the HBO television war film Conspiracy as Adolf Eichmann. The project also starred Kenneth Branagh and Colin Firth. For his portrayal of Eichmann, Tucci won another Golden Globe Award for Best Actor – Miniseries or Television Film. The film was critically acclaimed and won a Peabody Award.

In 2002, Tucci returned to the stage by starring in the revival of Terrence McNally's Frankie and Johnny in the Clair de Lune. Tucci received a Tony Award for Best Actor in a Play nomination for his performance in the play. Also in 2002, he starred in Sam Mendes' Road to Perdition opposite Tom Hanks. The film went on to gross $181 million at the box office and received six Academy Award nominations. He reunited with Hanks in Steven Spielberg's The Terminal (2004). That same year, Tucci appeared in Shall We Dance (2004). Tucci also portrayed Stanley Kubrick in the HBO television film, The Life and Death of Peter Sellers (2004). He also was a guest caller in an episode of Frasier. Also that year, Caedmon Audio released an audiobook of Tucci reading Kurt Vonnegut's 1973 novel Breakfast of Champions. In 2005, Tucci had his first voice role in the animated film Robots, which features other notable actors' voices such as Ewan McGregor, Halle Berry, and Robin Williams.

=== 2006–2010: work with Meryl Streep and acclaim ===
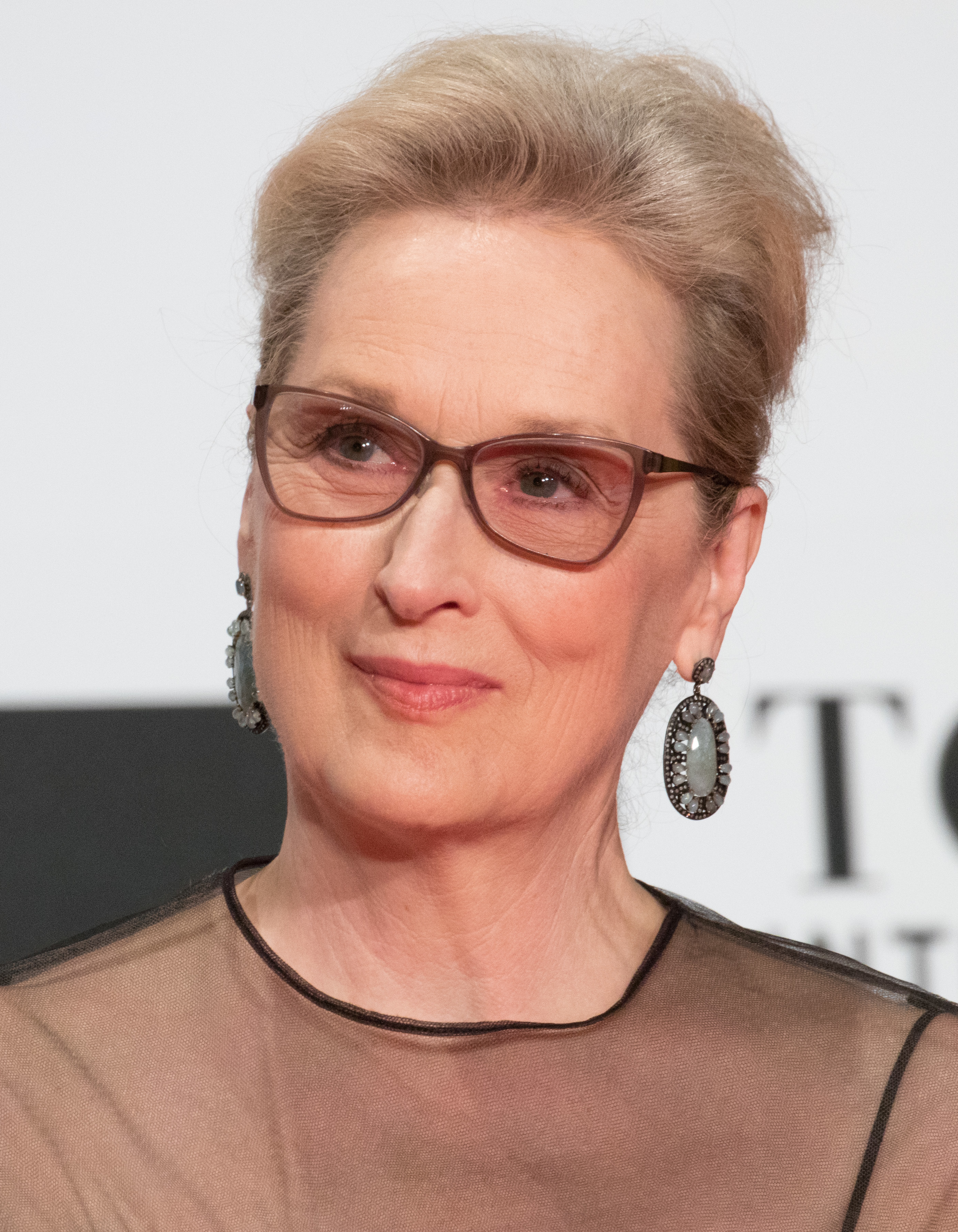
Tucci acted opposite Meryl Streep in The Devil Wears Prada (2006) and Julie & Julia (2009)

In 2006, Tucci had a major role in the comedy film The Devil Wears Prada, opposite Meryl Streep, Anne Hathaway, and Emily Blunt. Tucci portrays Nigel Kipling, a loyal confidant of Miranda Priestly (Streep). The film was a breakout role for him, with A.O. Scott of The New York Times declaring: "Mr. Tucci ... has never been better". The film was Tucci's highest-grossing film until Captain America: The First Avenger in 2011. Also in 2006, Tucci made an appearance on the television series Monk, for which he won the Primetime Emmy Award for Outstanding Guest Actor in a Comedy Series. Tucci returned to broadcast television by starring in the drama series 3 lbs, which premiered on November 14, 2006. However, due to low ratings CBS cancelled the series. The following year, Tucci went on to recur in the medical drama series ER. For his performance in ER, Tucci was nominated for the Primetime Emmy Award for Outstanding Guest Actor in a Drama Series. He was nominated for a Grammy Award for narrating the audiobook The One and Only Shrek! (2008).

In 2009, Tucci portrayed George Harvey, a serial killer of young girls in The Lovely Bones starring Saoirse Ronan. The film, Peter Jackson's adaptation of Alice Sebold's novel, earned Tucci Academy and Golden Globe award nominations for Best Supporting Actor. To prepare for the role, he consulted with retired FBI profiler John Douglas. Also in 2009, Tucci reunited with Meryl Streep in Nora Ephron's biographical comedy Julie & Julia. In the film, Tucci portrayed Paul Child, the husband of Julia Child (Streep). They were praised for their on-screen chemistry with Peter Travers of Rolling Stone declaring: "Tucci and Streep are magical together, creating a portrait of an unconventional marriage that deserves its own movie."

The following year, Tucci directed a revival of the Ken Ludwig play Lend Me a Tenor on Broadway, starring Tony Shalhoub. Furthermore, Tucci had a supporting role in the teen coming-of-age romantic comedy film Easy A (2010) starring Emma Stone. Tucci and Patricia Clarkson portrayed her easygoing and funny parents in the film. That same year, Tucci starred alongside Cher and Christina Aguilera in Burlesque. The following year, Tucci played Dr. Abraham Erskine in the Marvel Cinematic Universe film Captain America: The First Avenger (2011) starring Chris Evans.

=== 2011–2019: franchise roles and other work ===
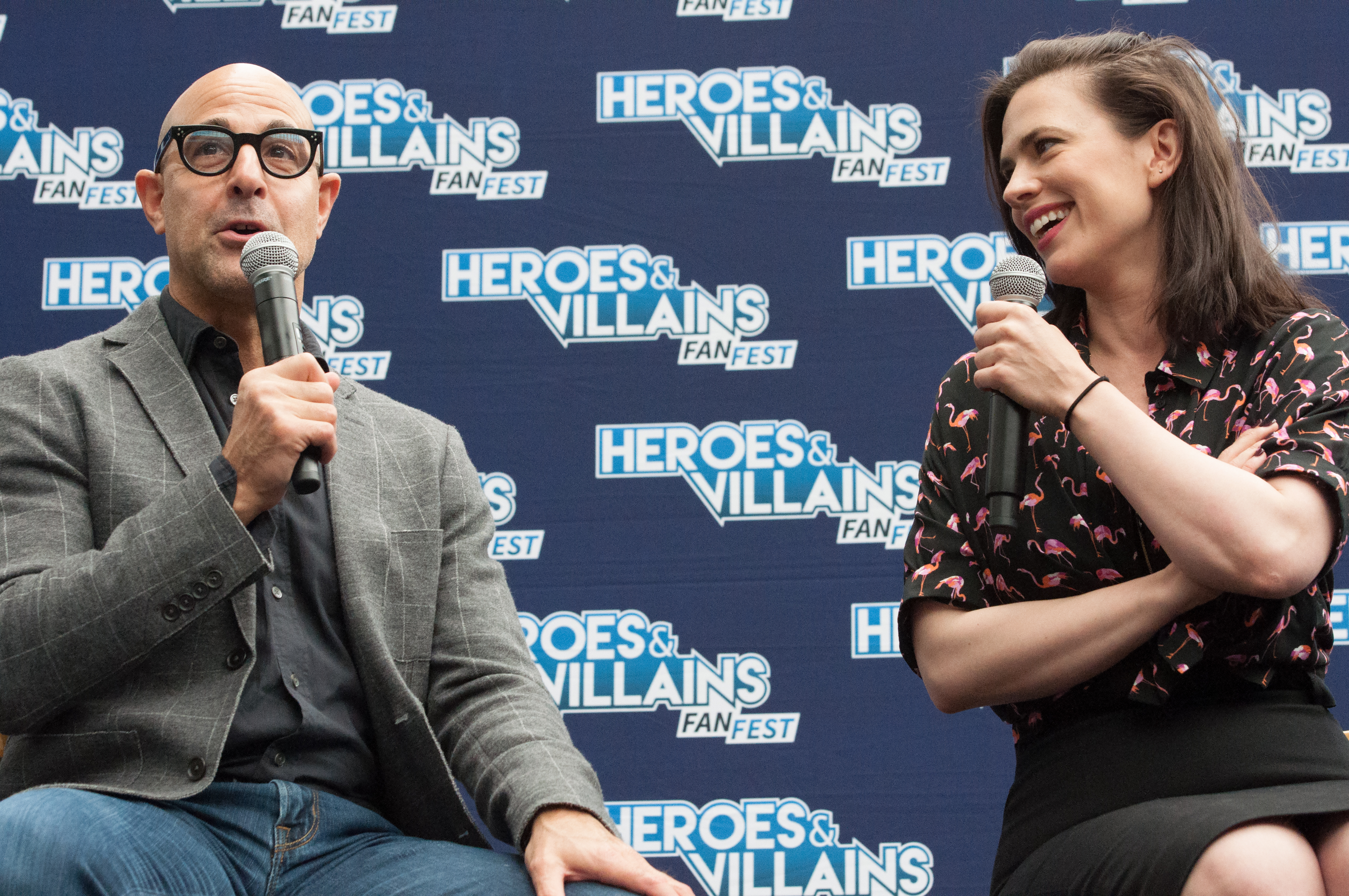
Tucci with Hayley Atwell in London, 2017

In 2011, Tucci took the role of Eric Dale in the J.C. Chandor directed drama film Margin Call starring Kevin Spacey, Jeremy Irons, Demi Moore, and Zachary Quinto. The film premiered at the Sundance Film Festival, where it earned critical acclaim and later a nomination for the Academy Award for Best Original Screenplay. In the fall of 2012, Tucci released his first cookbook titled The Tucci Cookbook. Tucci was also a co-owner of the Finch Tavern restaurant in Croton Falls, New York. He played Henry Warren Chang in the 30 Rock episode "Alexis Goodlooking and the Case of the Missing Whisky" in 2012.

From 2012 to 2015, Tucci portrayed Caesar Flickerman in The Hunger Games (2012) and its sequels The Hunger Games: Catching Fire (2013), The Hunger Games: Mockingjay – Part 1 (2014) and The Hunger Games: Mockingjay – Part 2 (2015). In 2013, Tucci played the role of the Ancient Greek God Dionysus in Percy Jackson: Sea of Monsters. Also, in 2013, he lent his voice to an episode of the animated series American Dad!. During this time, Tucci portrayed CEO Joshua Joyce in Transformers: Age of Extinction (2014). The same year, he voiced Leonardo da Vinci in the animated film Mr. Peabody & Sherman and had a cameo in Muppets Most Wanted.

From 2014 to 2020, he had a recurring role voicing character Herb Kazzaz in the animated series BoJack Horseman. Tucci portrayed Philippe I, Duke of Orléans in Alan Rickman's biographical costume romance drama A Little Chaos starring Kate Winslet. The following year, Tucci portrayed Mitchell Garabedian, a lawyer representing victims of sexual abuse in the biographical drama film Spotlight. The film was directed by Tom McCarthy and starred Michael Keaton, Mark Ruffalo, Rachel McAdams, John Slattery, and Liev Schreiber. The film received rave reviews, with Geoffrey Mcnab of The Independent writing: "Spotlight is an old-fashioned film that tells its story in a painstaking and thoroughly absorbing fashion. It's the kind of movie that you could imagine Henry Fonda or James Stewart starring in as decent, upstanding journalist heroes who refuse to give up on their story in the face of considerable difficulty and intimidation." The film won the Academy Award for Best Picture as well as Academy Award for Best Original Screenplay. Also in 2015, Tucci starred in the British series Fortitude as DCI Eugene Morton.

In 2017, Tucci wrote and directed the drama film Final Portrait. The same year, Tucci played the role of the composer Maestro Cadenza in the live-action adaptation of Disney's Beauty and the Beast, co-starring with Emma Watson and Dan Stevens. Tucci also returned to the Transformers film series by portraying Merlin in Transformers: The Last Knight. Furthermore, Tucci played the husband of Dame Fiona Maye, a British High Court judge, opposite Emma Thompson in The Children Act (2017), based on the book of the same name by Ian McEwan. Also, in 2017, Tucci starred in the miniseries Feud as Warner Bros. studio head Jack L. Warner. Feud received critical acclaim and Tucci received a nomination for the Primetime Emmy Award for Outstanding Supporting Actor in a Limited Series or Movie. In 2018, Tucci starred in the independent films Patient Zero, A Private War and Night Hunter. In 2019, Tucci starred in the drama series Limetown, based on the podcast of the same name. Facebook cancelled the series after one season had aired. The same year, Tucci starred in the horror film The Silence.

=== 2020–present ===
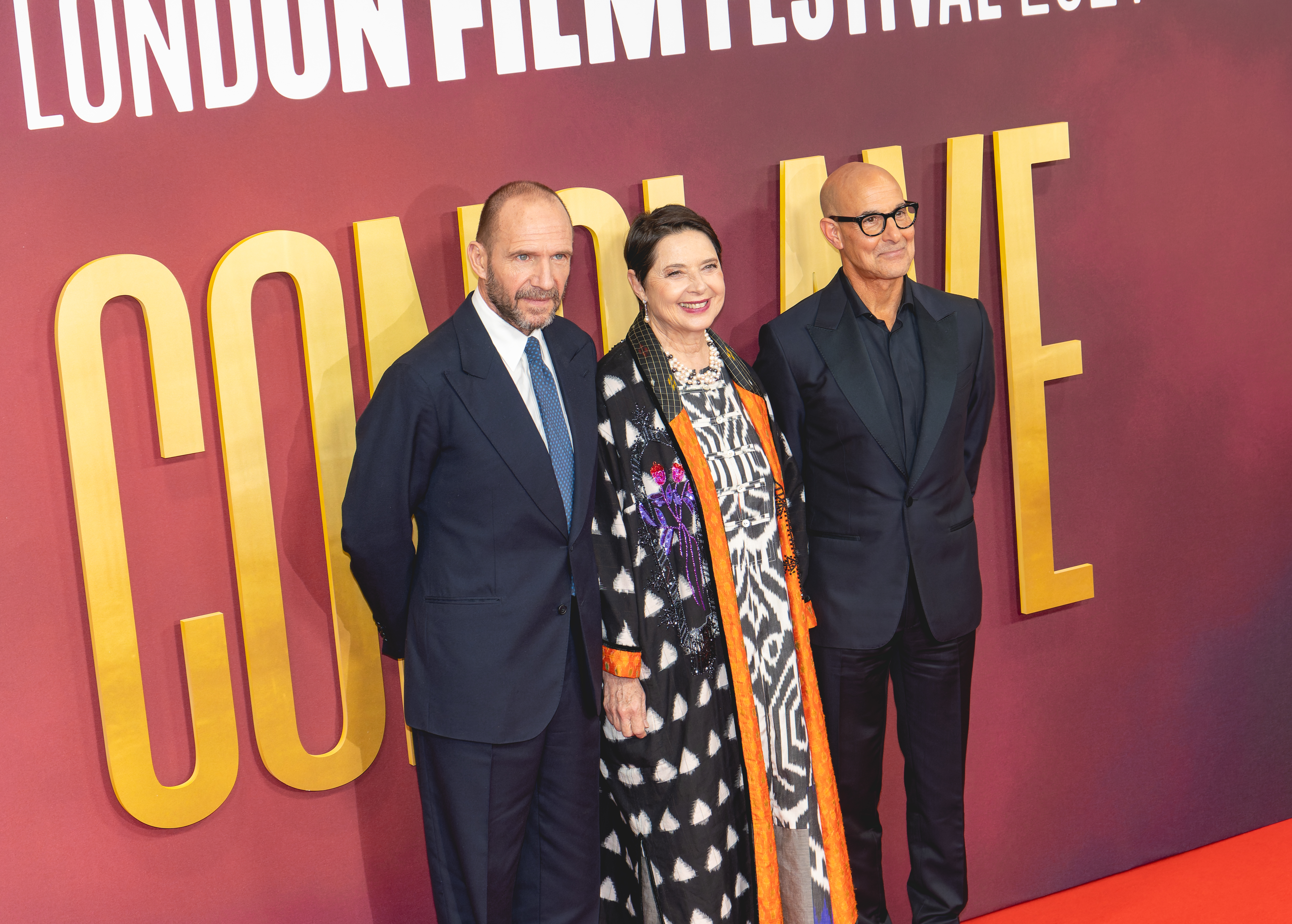
Tucci alongside Ralph Fiennes and Isabella Rossellini at the premiere of Conclave in 2024

In 2020, Tucci began voicing the character Bitsy Brandenham in the animated series Central Park. The series received a two-season order from Apple, with each season set to consist of 13 episodes each. The series premiered on May 29, 2020. In the same year, Tucci narrated the series The California Century, on notable people in the history of California told from the point of view of a screenwriter. In 2020, Tucci starred in the British drama film Supernova opposite Colin Firth. The film explores the relationship between a couple played by Tucci and Firth as one of them succumbs to early onset dementia. The film premiered at the San Sebastián International Film Festival and since has received critical acclaim. Guy Lodge, critic for Variety wrote of their chemistry:

Firth and Tucci are such reliable stalwarts that we tend not to regard their presence too closely in films these days: almost invariably, they fulfill our expectations of their refined gravitas. But there's something lovely and surprising in what they bring out of each other here, as they complement and reflect each other's curtness, evasiveness and occasional spillages of tenderness in the way that long-term couples do.

In 2021, Tucci hosted the culinary travel series, Stanley Tucci: Searching for Italy, a six-part original CNN series following the actor on a food tour of Italy. The series received two Primetime Emmy Award nominations, including one for Outstanding Hosted Nonfiction Series, and was renewed for a second season set to air in 2022. Caroline Framke of Variety praised the series, writing: "It's exactly the picturesque scenario you might expect and want from a travel series hosted by Tucci, an extraordinarily charming presence who knows and loves Italian food".

Tucci acted in the title role in the BBC One thriller series Inside Man (2022). The series was created by Steven Moffat and also starred David Tennant. In September, Tucci was cast as Grammy-winning producer Clive Davis in Whitney Houston: I Wanna Dance with Somebody (2022), a biopic of Whitney Houston. In 2023, Tucci acted in the Amazon Prime Video series Citadel starring Priyanka Chopra and Richard Madden. In 2024, Tucci played a major role in the Edward Berger film Conclave alongside Ralph Fiennes, which premiered at the 51st Telluride Film Festival. Tucci's 2024 book What I Ate in One Year won the "Non-Fiction: Lifestyle and Illustrated" category in the 2025 British Book Awards.

Tucci reprised the role of Nigel Kipling in The Devil Wears Prada 2, which was released in May 2026.

== Personal life ==
=== Charity work ===
On September 12, 2016, Tucci, alongside other celebrities, appeared in a video from the United Nations' refugee agency UNHCR to help raise awareness of the global refugee crisis. The video, titled "What They Took With Them", has the actors reading a poem, written by Jenifer Toksvig and inspired by primary accounts of refugees, and is part of UNHCR's #WithRefugees campaign, which also includes a petition to governments to expand asylum to provide further shelter, integrating job opportunities, and education.

On May 21, 2021, Tucci received a doctorate honoris causa in Humane Letters from the American University of Rome, in Rome, Italy, for his lifelong contribution to the arts and humanities.

=== Health issues ===
In September 2021, Tucci revealed that he had been diagnosed with oropharyngeal cancer three years earlier. He had received treatment (chemotherapy and radiation) after a tumor was found at the base of his tongue, and said it was unlikely that the tumor would return. In November 2022, he said there are still some foods he cannot eat, as a result of his cancer.

In October 2021, his memoir Taste: My Life Through Food was published, which describes his encounter with cancer and his love of food. The memoir was on The New York Times Best Seller List for 16 weeks, until February 13, 2022.

=== Marriages and family ===
Tucci married Kathryn Spath (born 1962, died 2009) in 1995. She was a social worker, former wife of actor and stage manager Alexander R. Scott, and former sister-in-law of Tucci's high school friend Campbell Scott. They had three children together. The couple also raised Kathryn's two children from her previous marriage. Tucci had an affair in 2002 with actress Edie Falco, with whom he was appearing on Broadway in Terrence McNally's Frankie and Johnny in the Clair de Lune, but the affair ended, and he returned to his wife and children. Spath died of breast cancer in 2009, aged 47.

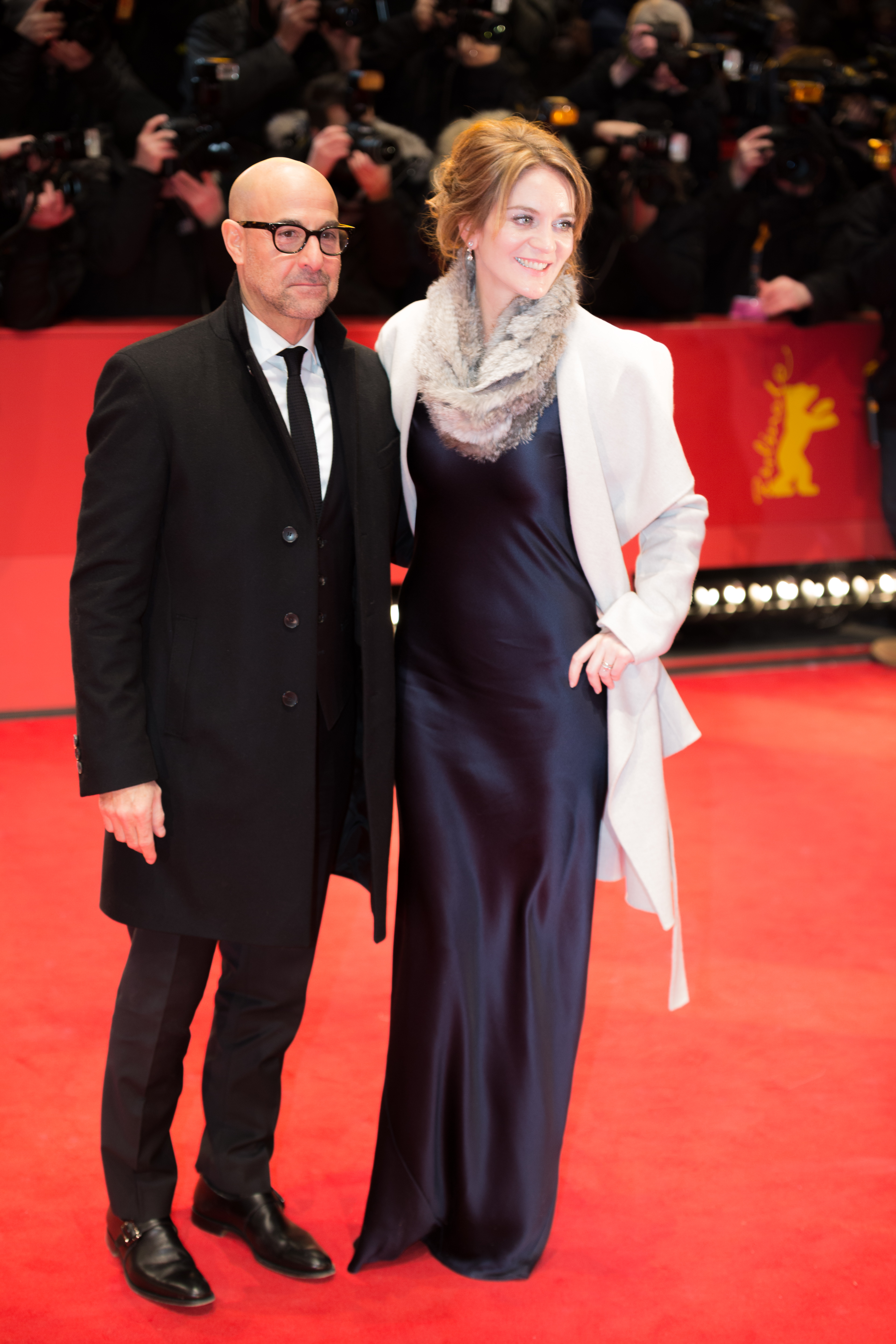
Tucci with his wife, Felicity Blunt, at the 67th Berlin International Film Festival, in 2017

In 2006, Tucci met Felicity Blunt (born 1981), a British literary agent of the Curtis Brown Group, at The Devil Wears Prada (2006) premiere. They later reconnected in 2010 at the wedding of Felicity's sister, British actress Emily Blunt (who co-starred with Tucci in The Devil Wears Prada) to actor John Krasinski. Tucci and Felicity became engaged in 2011, and married in a civil ceremony in the summer of 2012, followed by a larger observance at Middle Temple Hall in London on September 29, 2012. They have a son and a daughter.

== Bibliography ==
- Tucci, Stanley (October 9, 2012). The Tucci Cookbook. Gallery Books. ISBN 978-1451661255.
- Tucci, Stanley; Blunt, Felicity (2014). The Tucci Table: Cooking With Family and Friends. Gallery Books. ISBN 978-1476738567.
- Tucci, Stanley (October 5, 2021). Taste: My Life Through Food. Gallery Books. ISBN 978-1982168018.
- Tucci, Stanley (October 15, 2024). What I Ate in One Year. Gallery Books. ISBN 978-1-6680-5568-7.

== See also ==
- List of actors with Academy Award nominations
- List of Primetime Emmy Award winners
- List of Golden Globe winners
