= Phil Saviano =

American advocate for survivors of Catholic church sexual abuse

- Saviano in 1997
- Born: Phillip James Saviano; June 23, 1952; Worcester, Massachusetts, U.S.
- Died: November 28, 2021 (aged 69); Douglas, Massachusetts, U.S.
- Education: University of Massachusetts, Amherst; Boston University

Phillip James Saviano (June 23, 1952 – November 28, 2021) was an American advocate for survivors of Catholic church sexual abuse. As a youth in the early 1960s, Saviano was abused by a priest. Thirty years later, after reading about the priest abusing other youths in another state, Saviano went public, becoming one of the earliest survivors of church sexual abuse to do so. He brought a lawsuit against his local diocese, uncovering evidence of additional abuse. Eventually, his investigation led to The Boston Globe publishing a Pulitzer Prize-winning series of articles exposing the Catholic Archdiocese of Boston sex abuse scandal, which was dramatized in the 2015 Academy Award-winning film Spotlight.

After university, Saviano worked in public relations for hospitals, before shifting to a career in concert promotions, working with Judy Collins, Ella Fitzgerald, Mel Torme, and others. He was the founder of the New England chapter of Survivors Network of those Abused by Priests. After going public in 1992, he spent the remainder of his life investigating child abuse within the Catholic church and advocating for survivors, until his death in Douglas, Massachusetts at age 69.

== Early life ==
Born in Worcester, Massachusetts, on June 23, 1952, Phil Saviano was the third of four sons of Mary Bombara, a secretary and homemaker, and Pasquale Saviano, an electrician. The family was of Italian and Czech descent and Catholic on both sides. As a child, he enjoyed fishing and hiking, and worked delivering newspapers. He attended St. Denis Church in Douglas, Massachusetts, within the Roman Catholic Diocese of Worcester. In the early 1960s, when he was eleven years old, he and other children at the church were sexually abused by David A. Holley, a priest at St. Denis. The abuse continued for a year and a half, until Holley's departure from the parish.

Saviano earned a bachelor's degree in zoology from the University of Massachusetts, Amherst in 1975. He then went to Boston University and earned a master's degree in communications in 1979 or 1980. After graduating, Saviano worked in public relations and fundraising at a Boston hospital. His mother died in 1976; he never told her about the abuse he had suffered as a youth.

From 1982 until 1991, Saviano worked in concert publicity and promotions, working closely with his lifelong friend Judy Collins and with other artists such as Ella Fitzgerald and Mel Torme. He was also a dealer of Mexican folk art, launching an e-commerce website in 1992.

In 1984, Saviano was diagnosed with AIDS.

== Public disclosure ==
For about thirty years, Saviano thought he and his childhood friends had been Holley's only victims, until, in 1992, Saviano read a newspaper article reporting that Holley had been sued for abusing other children at a church in New Mexico in the 1970s. In December 1992, aged 40, unemployed, and believing that death from AIDS was imminent, Saviano gave an interview to The Boston Globe publicly disclosing Holley's abuse. Saviano was one of the earliest survivors of sexual abuse by a priest to go public. That year, Holley was sentenced to 275 years in prison for assaulting eight boys in New Mexico; in 2008, he died in prison at the age of 80.

After going public, Saviano requested reimbursement of his therapy expenses from the Worcester Diocese, but the Diocese refused to pay. Saviano sued and learned from evidence gathered during the court case that Holley was a serial child abuser, that seven bishops in four US states were aware of Holley's abuse, and that the church had secretly sent Holley to four different church-operated treatment centers. The church attempted to settle the case and offered Saviano $12,500 in exchange for his signing a confidentiality agreement, as it had done with other survivors, but Saviano refused; the church later paid the settlement without insisting on a confidentiality agreement. Saviano's settlement, after attorney fees, amounted to $5,700.

By the time the lawsuit settled in 1995, the development of antiretroviral treatments for AIDS led to Saviano's health improving. In 1997, Saviano established the New England chapter of Survivors Network of those Abused by Priests (SNAP). Saviano encouraged other victims to inform the public of their abuse, and documented dozens of other priests who abused children.

In 1998, he approached the Globe again, alleging that the Catholic Church had covered up abuse by thousands of priests around the world. The newspaper initially did not publish Saviano's allegations until 2002, when Martin Baron, a new editor at The Globe, pressed for an investigation of systemic child abuse in the church. With information and guidance from Saviano, the Globe published a series of articles in 2002 about the Catholic Archdiocese of Boston sex abuse scandal, winning the Pulitzer Prize for Public Service in 2003. A film about the reporting, Spotlight, won an Academy Award in 2015. Saviano consulted on the film and was portrayed by Neal Huff; the two became friends after working together.

== Later life ==
In 2009, Saviano learned he would need a kidney transplant. He received a donated kidney from a fellow church sexual abuse survivor from Minnesota. In 2021, after cardiac surgery and a stroke, Saviano was diagnosed with untreatable gallbladder cancer; he entered hospice care at his brother's home in Douglas in October and died on November 28, 2021, aged 69.
