= Mitchell Garabedian =

American lawyer

- Born: July 17, 1951 (age 75); Methuen, Massachusetts, U.S.
- Education: Boston University (BS); Northeastern University (MS); New England School of Law (JD)
- Occupation: Lawyer
- Known for: Representing victims in Catholic priest sexual abuse scandal

Mitchell Garabedian (born July 17, 1951) is a lawyer known for representing sexual abuse victims in the Boston area during the Catholic priest sexual abuse scandal, including the cases against Paul Shanley, John Geoghan, and the Archdiocese of Boston. He also represented one of the people who accused Jerry Sandusky of sexual misconduct, and the man who accused Bryon Hefner, the husband of former Massachusetts Senate President Stan Rosenberg, of sexual assault, leading to Rosenberg's resignation.

== Early life ==
Garabedian was the second of three children born to Armenian parents Mesroob and Juyard Garabedian and grew up on a 375-acre farm in Methuen, Massachusetts. The first member of his family to attend college, he attended Boston University (CGS, 1971 and CAS, 1973). He continued his education by getting a master's degree in political science from Northeastern University and a J.D. degree from the New England School of Law. He was admitted to the bar in 1979.

== Career ==
Garabedian has worked on numerous sexual abuse cases. In August 2016, he represented seven of the 21 victims who settled sex abuse cases against 10 Irish Christian Brothers from Bergen Catholic High School in Oradell, New Jersey, for $1.9 million. He was also with Heather Unruh during the November 2017 press conference when she alleged that Kevin Spacey molested her son.

In the Geoghan case, Garabedian was able to reach a financial settlement with the Boston Archdiocese on behalf of 86 people. At the time they reached the settlement, the Church would pay more than $30 million and plaintiffs would not be required to sign a non-disclosure agreement. Eventually, the Church pulled out of the $30 million settlement and settled for $10 million.

== In popular culture ==
Ted Danson portrayed Garabedian in the 2005 made-for-television film Our Fathers. Stanley Tucci portrayed him in the 2015 film Spotlight.
