= Tucci in Italy =

American television series

- Presented by: Stanley Tucci
- Composer: Alexander Parsons
- Country of origin: United States
- No. of seasons: 2
- No. of episodes: 10

Production
- Executive producers: Stanley Tucci; Lottie Birmingham; Amanda Lyon
- Producers: Francesco Ficarra; Sheena Whitemore
- Cinematography: Matt Ball
- Editors: Yulia Martynova; Hannah Briere-Edney; Jonnie Case; Gareth Blower; Sarjit Bains; Luke Price; Trace Taylor
- Production companies: SALT Productions; BBC Studios

Original release
- Network: National Geographic
- Release: May 18, 2025 – present

Related
- Stanley Tucci: Searching for Italy

Tucci in Italy is an American travel and food show premiered on May 18, 2025, on National Geographic. The series follows American actor Stanley Tucci, who travels around Italy exploring different regions' cultures, cuisines, and history.

It is the followup show to Stanley Tucci: Searching for Italy, which aired on CNN from 2021 to 2022. On June 16, 2025, National Geographic renewed the series for a second season.

== Reception ==
Review aggregator website Rotten Tomatoes reported a 100% approval rating based on 6 critic reviews. Metacritic, which uses a weighted average, assigned a score of 72 out of 100 based on 4 critics, indicating "generally favorable".

== Episodes ==
=== Season 1 (2025) ===
No. overall	No. in season	Title	Directed by	Original release date
1	1	"Tuscany"	N/A	May 18, 2025
2	2	"Lombardy"	Ian Denyer	May 18, 2025
3	3	"Trentino-Alto Adige"	Chris Parkin	May 25, 2025
4	4	"Abruzzo"	N/A	June 1, 2025
5	5	"Lazio"	Ian Denyer	June 8, 2025

=== Season 2 (2026) ===
No. overall	No. in season	Title	Directed by	Original release date
6	1	"Naples & Campania"	Unknown	May 11, 2026
7	2	"Sicily"	Unknown	May 11, 2026
8	3	"Le Marche"	Unknown	May 18, 2026
9	4	"Sardinia"	Unknown	May 18, 2026
10	5	"Veneto"	Unknown	May 25, 2026
