= Stanley Tucci: Searching for Italy =

American television series

- Presented by: Stanley Tucci
- Composer: Evan Lurie
- Country of origin: United States
- No. of seasons: 2
- No. of episodes: 14

Production
- Running time: 60 minutes (incl. adverts)
- Production company: Raw Television

Original release
- Network: CNN
- Release: February 14, 2021 – October 30, 2022

Related
- Tucci in Italy

Stanley Tucci: Searching for Italy is an American travel and food show that premiered on February 14, 2021, on CNN. The series follows American actor Stanley Tucci, who travels around Italy visiting each region and exploring their cultures, cuisine, and history.

The series has received seven Primetime Emmy Award nominations, winning Emmys for Outstanding Hosted Nonfiction Series in 2021, 2022, and 2024. Its second season premiered on May 1, 2022.

CNN canceled the show in December 2022 as part of the network's revamp and cancellation of all original programming because of Warner Bros. Discovery's cost cuts. Tucci expressed interest in continuing the show on another network. In 2024, Tucci filmed another 10 episodes exploring Italian cuisine for National Geographic. The first season of that followup show, Tucci in Italy, premiered on May 18, 2025.

== Episodes ==
Season	Episodes	Originally released	
Season	Episodes	First released	Last released
1	6	February 14, 2021	March 21, 2021
2	8	May 1, 2022	October 30, 2022

=== Season 1 (2021) ===
No. overall	No. in season	Title	Directed by	Original release date
1	1	"Naples and the Amalfi Coast"	Satiyesh Manoharajah	February 14, 2021
2	2	"Rome"	Satiyesh Manoharajah & Neil Ferguson	February 21, 2021
3	3	"Bologna"	Satiyesh Manoharajah	February 28, 2021
4	4	"Milan"	Chiara Messineo & Neil Ferguson	March 7, 2021
5	5	"Tuscany"	Satiyesh Manoharajah & Archie Powell	March 14, 2021
6	6	"Sicily"	Chloë Avery & Chiara Messineo	March 21, 2021

=== Season 2 (2022) ===
No. overall	No. in season	Title	Directed by	Original release date
7	1	"Venice"	Ian Denyer	May 1, 2022
8	2	"Piedmont"	Gareth Johnson	May 8, 2022
9	3	"Umbria"	Ian Denyer	May 15, 2022
10	4	"London"	Ian Denyer	May 22, 2022
11	5	"Calabria"	Leo McCrea	October 9, 2022
12	6	"Sardinia"	Christian Watt	October 16, 2022
13	7	"Puglia"	Leo McCrea	October 23, 2022
14	8	"Liguria"	Unknown	October 30, 2022

== Production ==
In an interview with The Hollywood Reporter, Tucci acknowledged the influence of another CNN original series, Anthony Bourdain's Parts Unknown. Tucci said: "The show that we are doing is distinctly different than his: I am not nearly as adventurous as Tony was, not nearly. Or as brave. But what he did is open the doors to all of us who were interested in food, and travel, to explore in our own ways. He was an extraordinary writer, a nice person, and a great explorer of the human condition through food." In a February 2022 interview with People magazine, Tucci said that he would "never try to take [Bourdain's] place".

Amy Entelis, CNN's executive vice president of talent and content development, said: "The Bourdain show was a big experiment at the time, but it quickly became clear that our audience was very interested in stories beyond breaking news, but that were interesting, substantive, thought-provoking stories about food and culture around the world". Entelis added, “There was never a question in our minds about whether we would return [to the genre], it was going to be, what is the right show, who is the right person, what is the right time in terms of launching something new. I think we feel really good right now about putting this show out in the world.”

Four of the episodes in the first season were filmed in the fall of 2019, while the episodes set in Naples and Bologna were filmed in the summer of 2020, during the COVID-19 pandemic in Italy.

The series was renewed for a second season on February 24, 2021.

== Release ==
On January 19, 2022, it was announced that the second season would premiere on March 13, 2022. However, on March 2, it was announced that the premiere had been postponed to an unspecified date later in the spring, due to CNN's continuing coverage of the 2022 Russian invasion of Ukraine. On April 12, 2022, it was announced that the premiere had been rescheduled for May 1, 2022. The second season's first four episodes aired in May (then on BBC Two in October), and its final four episodes aired beginning on October 9, 2022.

== Reception ==
=== Ratings ===
The show's premiere on February 14, 2021, had 1.52 million viewers, and its second episode, which aired on February 21, had 1.64 million viewers. The show's main viewing demographic consisted of adults between the ages of 25 and 54.

=== Critical reception ===
On Rotten Tomatoes, the first season has an approval rating of 71% based on 7 reviews, with an average rating of 5.30/10. On Metacritic, the series has an aggregated score of 71 out of 100 based on 8 critic reviews, indicating "generally favorable reviews".

John Anderson of The Wall Street Journal, wrote that Stanley Tucci is "not a performer given to grand gestures. So when he tastes the yolk-fattened spaghetti carbonara in a Roman restaurant, closes both eyes and spontaneously hugs the chef, it is the equivalent of fireworks over the Tiber", adding that the series contains a number of such moments. He concluded: "It's a marvelously well-written show, briskly paced, and makes the rest of the food-TV competition as appetizing as last night's mozzarella sticks." Helen Rosner of The New Yorker described the series as "a good show, but not quite a great one. Its culinary discoveries [...] are not new, and its gloss on the less glamorous aspects of Italian culture and history are rarely more than decorative". She described Tucci in the series as "a figure out of time", and wrote: "Like Tucci, Anthony Bourdain was rich in charisma and possessed unlikely sex appeal. But Bourdain the travel-show host served as a spotlight, fondly illuminating the people and places around him. Tucci is an electromagnet. Even when he's in a crowd, he seems like the only person on the screen", adding: "the show is at its best when it stops fighting the desire to focus entirely on him".

Sophie Gilbert, writing for The Atlantic, said that the series "presents itself as escapism, even as it half-acknowledges the reality of the pandemic", and wrote: "Some travelogues, such as the late Anthony Bourdain's Parts Unknown, seek out underexplored destinations and culinary traditions. Searching for Italy takes its audience through the most obvious stops on the Italian itinerary (Rome! Milan! Tuscany!) while winking at the darker crevices of our imagination." Caroline Framke, writing for Variety, criticized the series for choosing to air an episode filmed during a brief period of respite from the COVID-19 pandemic in Italy as the first episode. However, she praised Tucci for exploring Rome's less well-known locations and meals in the second episode, including "a fascinating detour into the inventive ways Italian chefs have transformed offal, or all the organs and bits of gristly meat that poorer Italians learned to work into delicacies." Lucy Mangan of The Guardian gave the series 3/5 stars, writing: "Tucci is an utterly inoffensive guide throughout this sweet, light delizia of a documentary, but there is one moment with Coccia that nicely illustrates his one weakness – which is that he is slightly too muted, too self-effacing."

Benji Wilson of The Daily Telegraph gave the series 2/5 stars, writing: "Tucci is a wonderful actor but a less engaging tour guide, largely because he's as smooth and perfect as a gleaming burrata." John Doyle of The Globe and Mail wrote: "You want more information than comes in a tourism brochure. Sometimes what Tucci offers, in his beautifully modulated voice, is simply bad, simplified history and worse social science."

== Awards and nominations ==
Year	Award	Category	Nominee(s)	Result	Ref.
2021	Critics' Choice Real TV Awards	Best Travel/Adventure Series	Stanley Tucci: Searching for Italy	Won	
2021	Critics' Choice Real TV Awards	Best Show Host	Stanley Tucci	Nominated	
2021	Critics' Choice Real TV Awards	Male Star of the Year	Stanley Tucci	Nominated	
2021	Primetime Emmy Awards	Outstanding Hosted Nonfiction Series or Special	Stanley Tucci, Adam Hawkins, Eve Kay, Amy Entelis, Lyle Gamm, Jon Adler, and Molly Harrington	Won	
2021	Primetime Emmy Awards	Outstanding Sound Mixing for a Nonfiction or Reality Program (Single or Multi-Camera)	Tom O'Pray and Chris Gibbions (for "Naples and the Amalfi Coast")	Nominated	
2022	Producers Guild of America Awards	Best Non-Fiction Television	Stanley Tucci: Searching for Italy	Nominated	
2022	Primetime Emmy Awards	Outstanding Hosted Nonfiction Series or Special	Stanley Tucci, Tom Barry, Eve Kay, Adam Hawkins, Amy Entelis, Lyle Gamm, and Jon Adler	Won	
2022	Primetime Emmy Awards	Outstanding Cinematography for a Nonfiction Program	Andrew Muggleton (for "Venice")	Nominated	
2022	Primetime Emmy Awards	Outstanding Directing for a Documentary/Nonfiction Program	Ian Denyer (for "Venice")	Nominated	
2022	Primetime Emmy Awards	Outstanding Picture Editing for a Nonfiction Program	Hamit Shonpal (for "Venice")	Nominated	
2022	Primetime Emmy Awards	Outstanding Sound Mixing for a Nonfiction or Reality Program (Single or Multi-Camera)	Tom O'Pray and Renato Ferrari (for "Venice")	Nominated	
2022	Cinema Eye Honours	Outstanding Anthology Series	Stanley Tucci: Searching for Italy	Nominated	
2022	Cinema Eye Honours	Outstanding Broadcast Cinematography	Andrew Muggleton	Nominated	
2023	Producers Guild of America Awards	Best Non-Fiction Television	Stanley Tucci: Searching for Italy	Won	
2023	Hollywood Creative Alliance Creative Arts TV Awards	Best Broadcast Network or Cable Nonfiction Series	Stanley Tucci: Searching for Italy	Nominated	
2023	Primetime Emmy Awards	Outstanding Hosted Nonfiction Series or Special	Stanley Tucci: Searching for Italy	Won	
2023	Primetime Emmy Awards	Outstanding Cinematography for a Nonfiction Program	Andrew Muggleton (for "Calabria")	Nominated	
2023	Primetime Emmy Awards	Outstanding Picture Editing for a Nonfiction Program	Liz Roe (for "Calabria")	Nominated	
2023	Primetime Emmy Awards	Outstanding Sound Mixing for a Nonfiction Program (Single or Multi-Camera)	Matt Skilton, Christopher Syner (for "Calabria")	Nominated	

== Eva Longoria: Searching for Mexico ==
Raw Television repeated the format of Stanley Tucci: Searching for Italy with 2023's Eva Longoria: Searching for Mexico, presented by actor Eva Longoria. Tucci is an executive producer.

== See also ==
- Tucci in Italy, a 2025 followup show on National Geographic
