= 73rd Primetime Creative Arts Emmy Awards =

2021 American television programming awards

- Date: September 11–12, 2021
- Location: The Event Deck at L.A. Live; Los Angeles, California
- Presented by: Academy of Television Arts & Sciences
- Most awards: The Queen's Gambit (9)
- Most nominations: The Mandalorian (19)

Television/radio coverage
- Network: FXX
- Produced by: Bob Bain
- Directed by: Rich Preuss

The 73rd Primetime Creative Arts Emmy Awards honored the best in artistic and technical achievement in American prime time television programming from June 1, 2020, until May 31, 2021, as chosen by the Academy of Television Arts & Sciences. The awards were presented across three ceremonies on September 11 and 12, 2021, at the Event Deck at L.A. Live in Downtown Los Angeles, California, preceding the 73rd Primetime Emmy Awards on September 19. A total of 99 Creative Arts Emmys were presented across 92 categories. The ceremonies were produced by Bob Bain, directed by Rich Preuss, and broadcast in the United States by FXX on September 18.

The Queen's Gambit won nine awards, leading all programs; The Mandalorian and Saturday Night Live followed with seven wins each. The Mandalorian also received the most nominations with 19, followed by WandaVision with 15 and Saturday Night Live with 14. Program awards went to Boys State, Carpool Karaoke: The Series, Dolly Parton's Christmas on the Square, For All Mankind: Time Capsule, Genndy Tartakovsky's Primal, Love, Death & Robots, Queer Eye, RuPaul's Drag Race: Untucked, Secrets of the Whales, Space Explorers: The ISS Experience, Stanley Tucci: Searching for Italy, Uncomfortable Conversations with a Black Man, and 76 Days. Netflix led all networks with 34 wins and 104 nominations.

== Winners and nominees ==
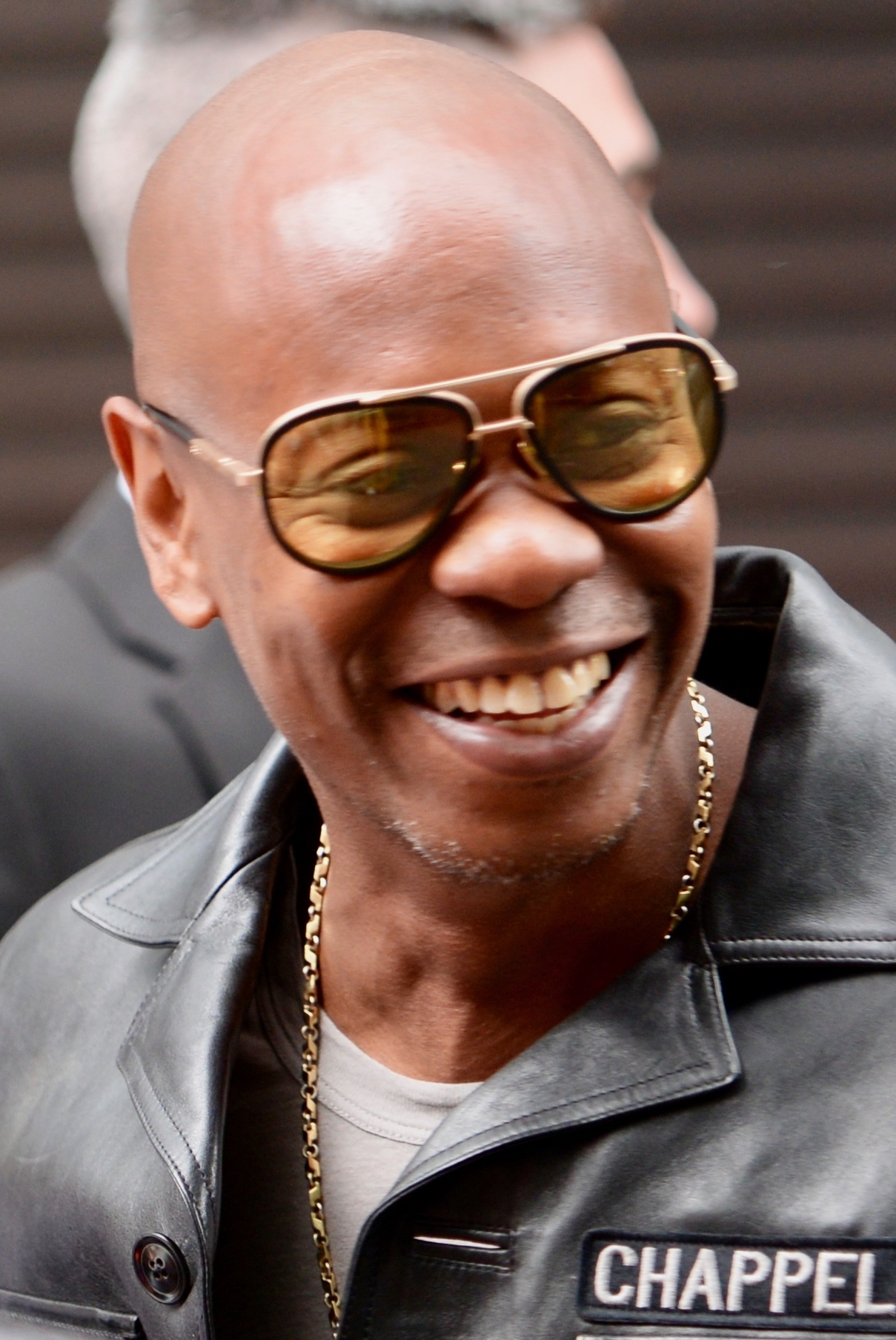
Dave Chappelle, Outstanding Guest Actor in a Comedy Series winner

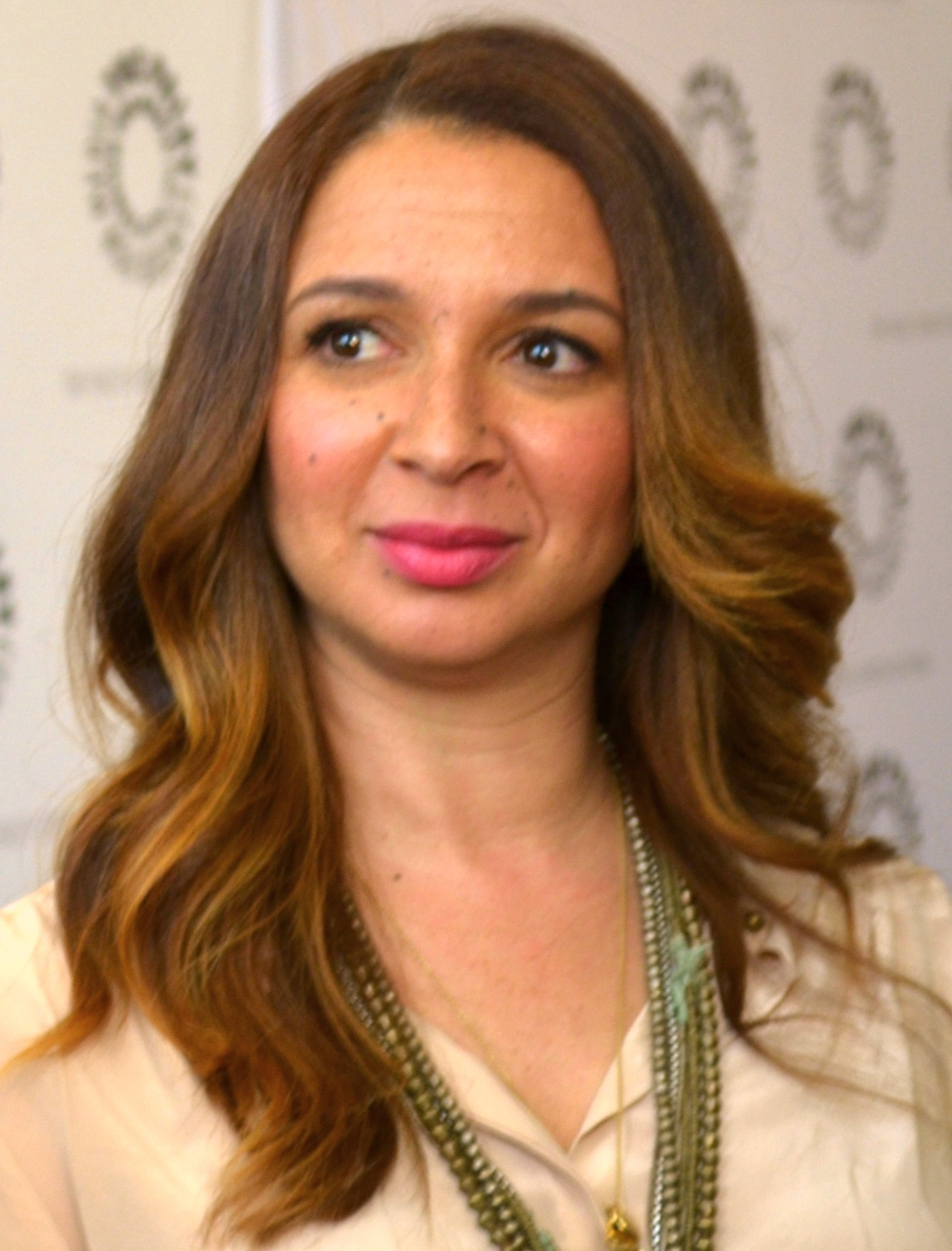
Maya Rudolph, Outstanding Guest Actress in a Comedy Series and Outstanding Character Voice-Over Performance winner

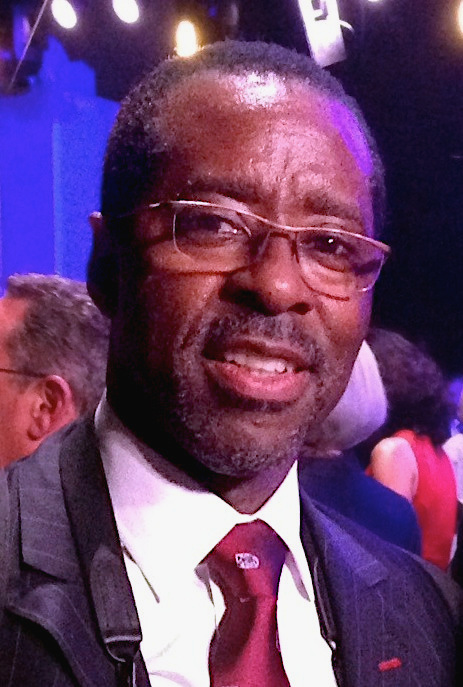
Courtney B. Vance, Outstanding Guest Actor in a Drama Series winner

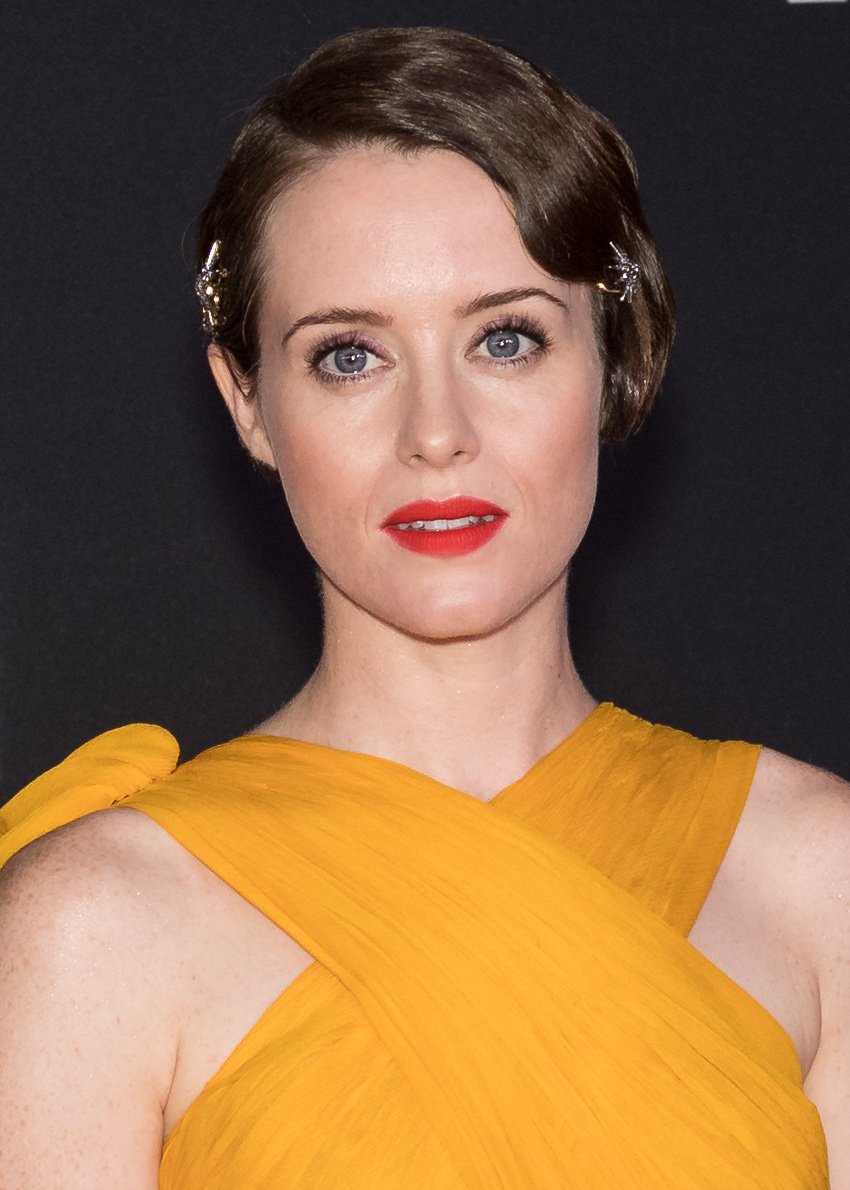
Claire Foy, Outstanding Guest Actress in a Drama Series winner

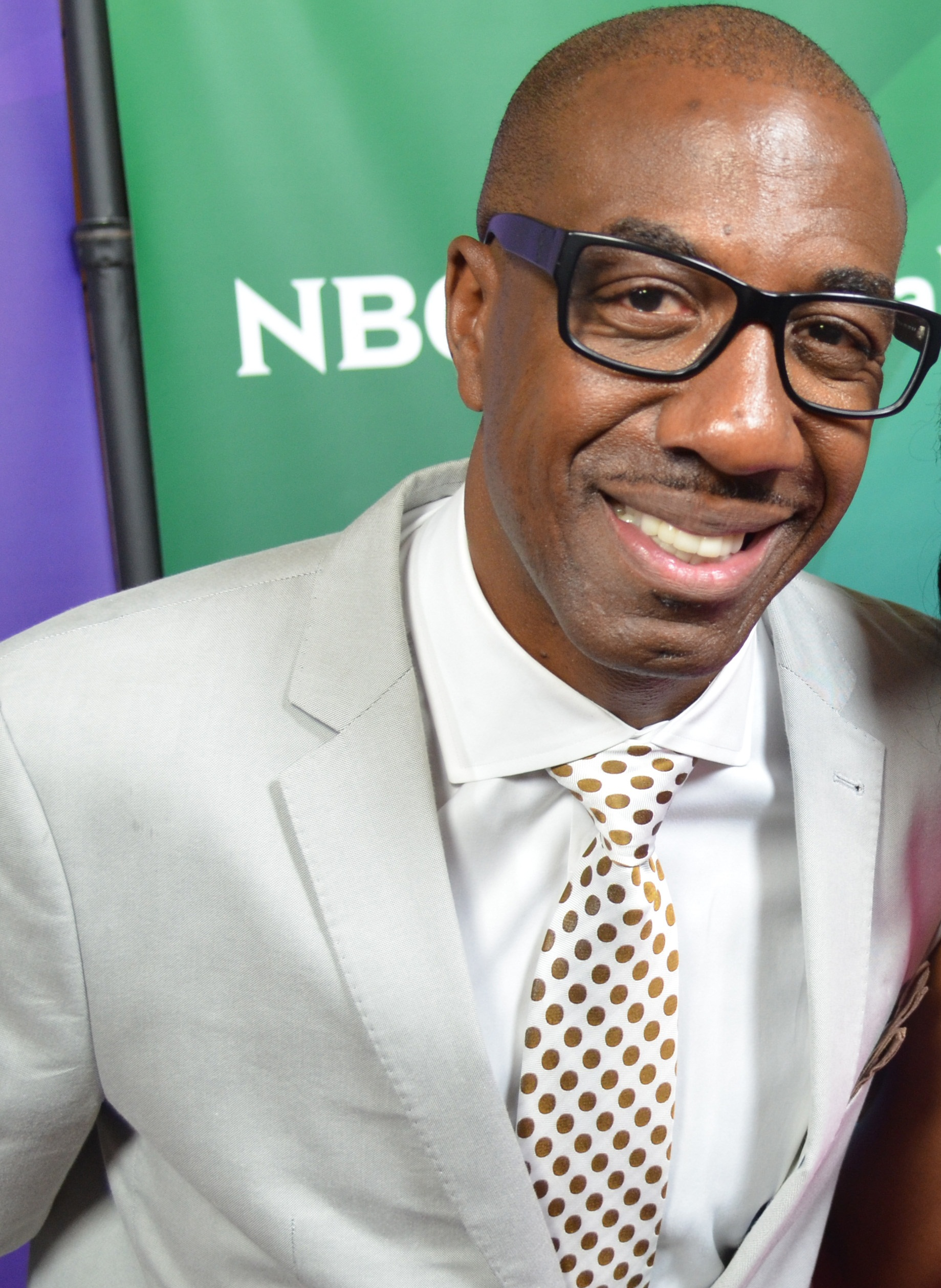
J. B. Smoove, Outstanding Actor in a Short Form Comedy or Drama Series winner

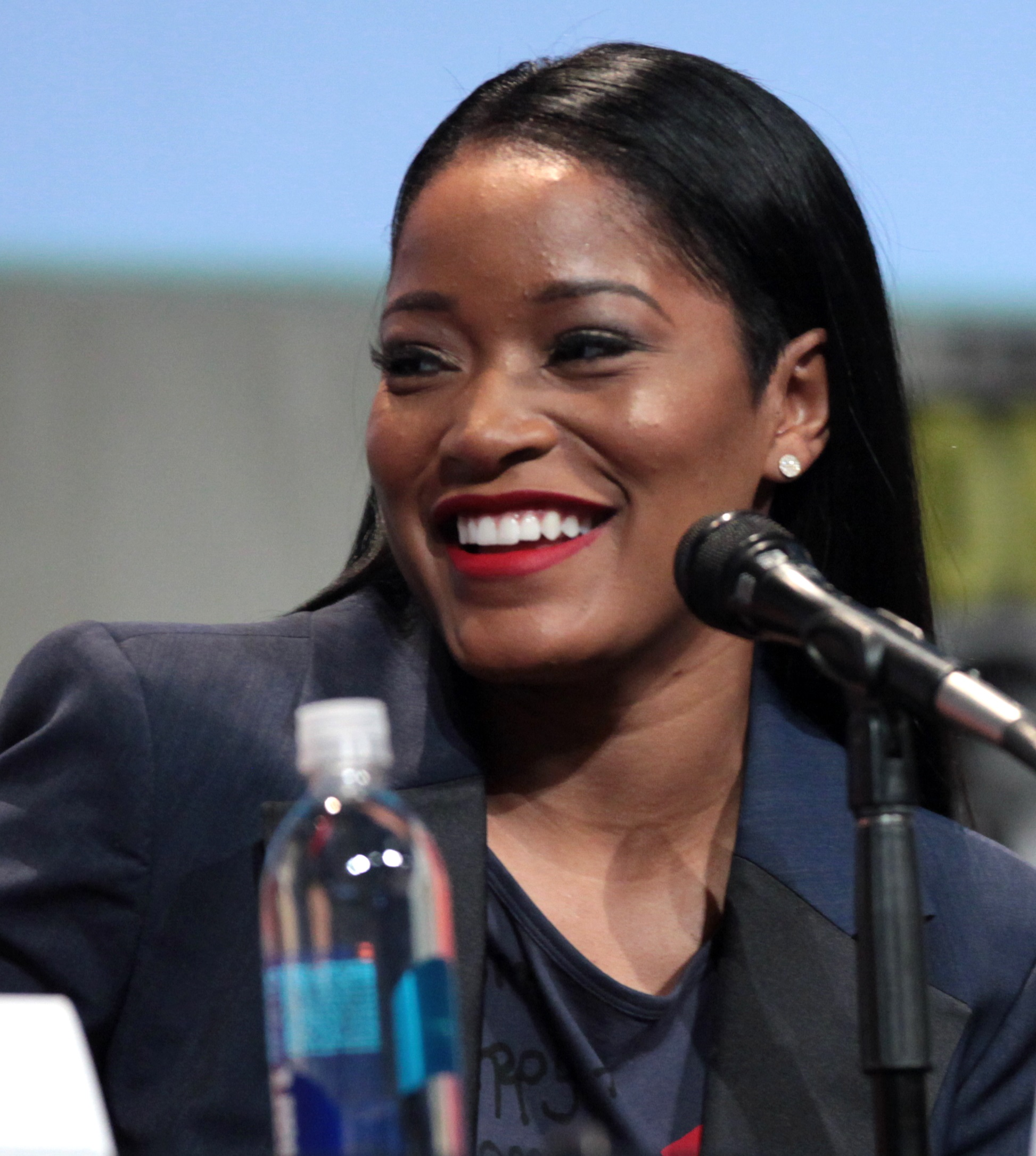
Keke Palmer, Outstanding Actress in a Short Form Comedy or Drama Series winner

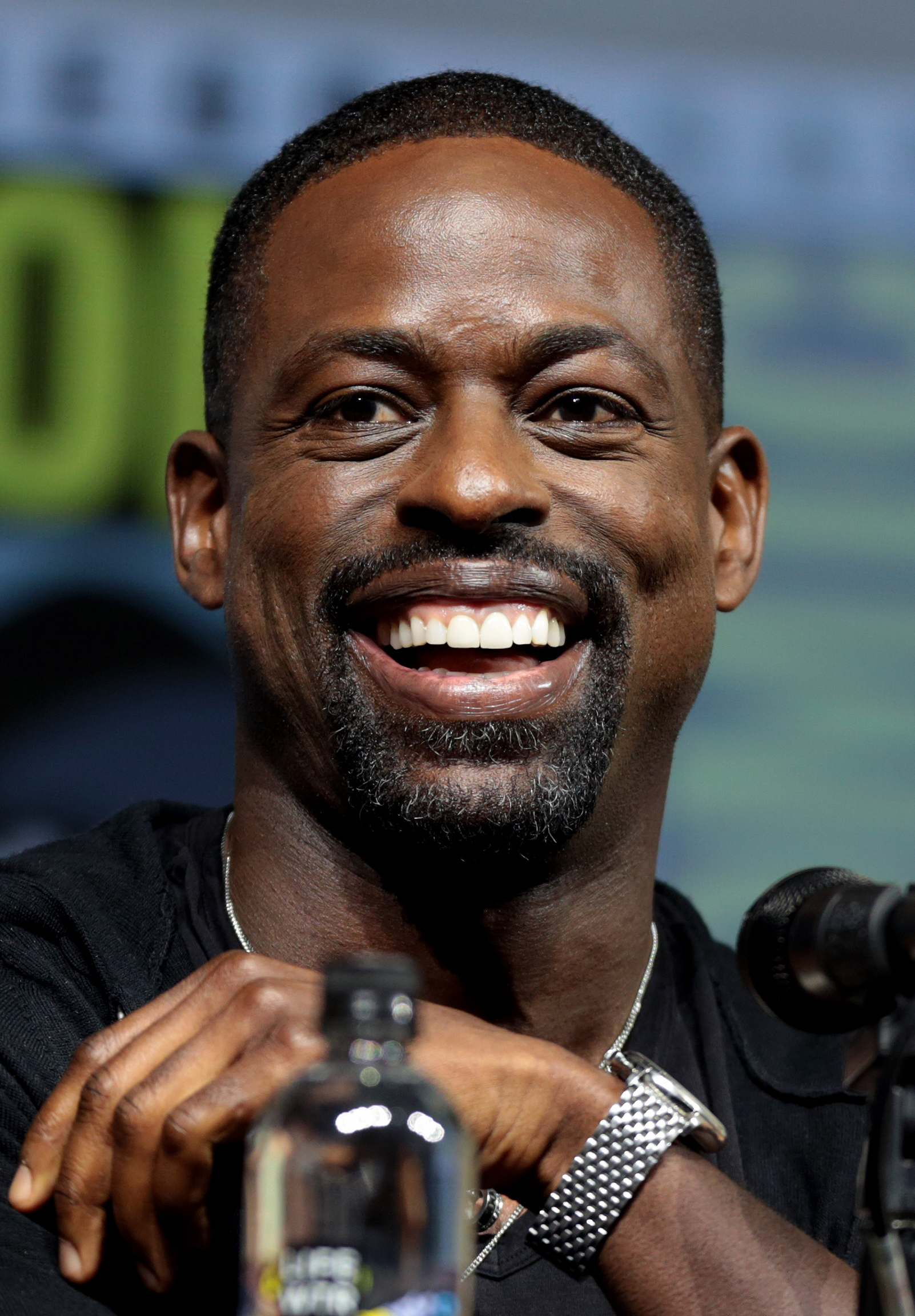
Sterling K. Brown, Outstanding Narrator winner

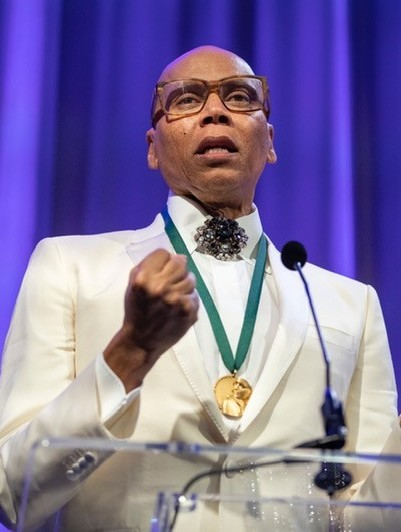
RuPaul, Outstanding Host for a Reality or Competition Program winner

Winners are listed first, highlighted in boldface, and indicated with a double dagger (‡). (Note: The outlets listed for each program are the U.S. broadcasters or streaming services identified in the nominations, which for some international productions are different than the broadcaster(s) that originally commissioned the program.) Sections are based upon the categories listed in the 2020–2021 Emmy rules and procedures. Area awards and juried awards are denoted next to the category names as applicable. (Note: Area awards are non-competitive; any nominee with at least 90% approval received an Emmy. If no nominee received 90% approval, the nominee with the highest approval received an Emmy; for area awards in picture editing and sound, there was an additional requirement that the highest-rated nominee must have at least 50% approval.; Juried awards generally do not have nominations; instead, all entrants were screened before members of the appropriate peer group, and one, more than one, or no entry was awarded an Emmy based on the jury's vote.) For simplicity, producers who received nominations for program awards have been omitted.

=== Programs ===
Programs
**Outstanding Television Movie**: **Dolly Parton's Christmas on the Square (Netflix)**‡; Oslo (HBO); Robin Roberts Presents: Mahalia (Lifetime); Sylvie's Love (Prime Video); Uncle Frank (Prime Video)	**Outstanding Animated Program**: **Genndy Tartakovsky's Primal: "Plague of Madness" (Adult Swim)**‡; Big Mouth: "The New Me" (Netflix); Bob's Burgers: "Worms of In-Rear-ment" (Fox); The Simpsons: "The Dad-Feelings Limited" (Fox); South Park: The Pandemic Special (Comedy Central)
**Outstanding Structured Reality Program**: **Queer Eye (Netflix)**‡; Antiques Roadshow (PBS); Property Brothers: Forever Home (HGTV); Running Wild with Bear Grylls (National Geographic); Shark Tank (ABC)	**Outstanding Unstructured Reality Program**: **RuPaul's Drag Race: Untucked (VH1)**‡; Becoming (Disney+); Below Deck (Bravo); Indian Matchmaking (Netflix); Selling Sunset (Netflix)
**Outstanding Documentary or Nonfiction Series (Area)**: **Secrets of the Whales (Disney+)**‡; Allen v. Farrow (HBO); American Masters (PBS); City So Real (National Geographic); Pretend It's a City (Netflix)	**Outstanding Documentary or Nonfiction Special (Area)**: **Boys State (Apple TV+)**‡; The Bee Gees: How Can You Mend a Broken Heart (HBO); Framing Britney Spears (The New York Times Presents) (FX); The Social Dilemma (Netflix); Tina (HBO)
**Outstanding Hosted Nonfiction Series or Special (Area)**: **Stanley Tucci: Searching for Italy (CNN)**‡; My Next Guest Needs No Introduction with David Letterman (Netflix); Oprah with Meghan and Harry: A CBS Primetime Special (CBS); United Shades of America with W. Kamau Bell (CNN); Vice (Showtime)	**Exceptional Merit in Documentary Filmmaking (Juried)**: **76 Days (Pluto)**‡; Dick Johnson Is Dead (Netflix); Welcome to Chechnya (HBO)
**Outstanding Short Form Comedy, Drama or Variety Series**: **Carpool Karaoke: The Series (Apple TV)**‡; Late Night with Seth Meyers: CORRECTIONS (YouTube); The Randy Rainbow Show (YouTube); Reno 911! (Quibi); Stephen Colbert Presents Tooning Out the News (Paramount+)	**Outstanding Short Form Nonfiction or Reality Series**: **Uncomfortable Conversations with a Black Man (YouTube)**‡; Full Frontal with Samantha Bee Presents: Pandemic Video Diaries: Vaxxed and Waxxed (TBS); Inside Pixar (Disney+); Pose: Identity, Family, Community (FX); Top Chef: Last Chance Kitchen (Bravo)
**Outstanding Short Form Animated Program**: **Love, Death & Robots: "Ice" (Netflix)**‡; Maggie Simpson In: The Force Awakens from Its Nap (Disney+); Once Upon a Snowman (Disney+); Robot Chicken: "Endgame" (Adult Swim)	**Outstanding Interactive Program**: **Space Explorers: The ISS Experience (Oculus)**‡; Create Together with Joseph Gordon-Levitt (YouTube); Inside COVID19 (Oculus); Welcome to the Blumhouse Live (Prime Video)
**Outstanding Innovation in Interactive Programming (Juried)**: **For All Mankind: Time Capsule (Apple TV+)**‡

=== Performing ===
Performing
**Outstanding Guest Actor in a Comedy Series**: **Dave Chappelle – Saturday Night Live: "Host: Dave Chappelle" as host (NBC)**‡; Alec Baldwin – Saturday Night Live: "Host: Dave Chappelle" as President Donald Trump (NBC); Morgan Freeman – The Kominsky Method: "Chapter 20. The round toes, of the high shoes" as Morgan Freeman (Netflix); Daniel Kaluuya – Saturday Night Live: "Host: Daniel Kaluuya" as host (NBC); Dan Levy – Saturday Night Live: "Host: Dan Levy" as host (NBC)	**Outstanding Guest Actress in a Comedy Series**: **Maya Rudolph – Saturday Night Live: "Host: Maya Rudolph" as host (NBC)**‡; Jane Adams – Hacks: "I Think She Will" as Nina Daniels (HBO Max); Yvette Nicole Brown – A Black Lady Sketch Show: "But the Tilapias Are Fine Though, Right?" as Judge Harper (HBO); Bernadette Peters – Zoey's Extraordinary Playlist: "Zoey's Extraordinary Girls' Night" as Deb (NBC); Issa Rae – A Black Lady Sketch Show: "My Booty Look Juicy, Don't It?" as Jess (HBO); Kristen Wiig – Saturday Night Live: "Host: Kristen Wiig" as host (NBC)
**Outstanding Guest Actor in a Drama Series**: **Courtney B. Vance – Lovecraft Country: "Whitey's on the Moon" as George Freeman (HBO)**‡; Don Cheadle – The Falcon and the Winter Soldier: "New World Order" as Colonel James Rhodes / War Machine (Disney+); Charles Dance – The Crown: "Gold Stick" as Lord Mountbatten (Netflix); Timothy Olyphant – The Mandalorian: "Chapter 9: The Marshal" as Cobb Vanth (Disney+); Carl Weathers – The Mandalorian: "Chapter 12: The Siege" as Greef Karga (Disney+)	**Outstanding Guest Actress in a Drama Series**: **Claire Foy – The Crown: "48:1" as Queen Elizabeth II (Netflix)**‡; Alexis Bledel – The Handmaid's Tale: "Testimony" as Emily (Hulu); Mckenna Grace – The Handmaid's Tale: "Pigs" as Esther Keyes (Hulu); Sophie Okonedo – Ratched: "The Dance" as Charlotte Wells (Netflix); Phylicia Rashad – This Is Us: "I've Got This" as Carol "Mama C" Clarke (NBC)
**Outstanding Actor in a Short Form Comedy or Drama Series**: **J. B. Smoove – Mapleworth Murders as Chief Billy Bills (Quibi)**‡; Kevin Hart – Die Hart as Kevin Hart (Quibi); John Lutz – Mapleworth Murders as Gilbert Pewntz (Quibi); Brendan Scannell – Bonding as Pete Devon (Netflix); John Travolta – Die Hart as Ron Wilcox (Quibi)	**Outstanding Actress in a Short Form Comedy or Drama Series**: **Keke Palmer – Keke Palmer's Turnt Up with the Taylors as Barbie, Gammy Tay, Lil Thad, Miranda, and Rick (Facebook Watch)**‡; Nathalie Emmanuel – Die Hart as Jordan King (Quibi); Kerri Kenney-Silver – Reno 911! as Deputy Trudy Wiegel (Quibi); Paula Pell – Mapleworth Murders as Mrs. Abigail Mapleworth (Quibi)
**Outstanding Character Voice-Over Performance**: **Maya Rudolph – Big Mouth: "A Very Special 9/11 Episode" as Connie the Hormone Monstress (Netflix)**‡; Stacey Abrams – Black-ish: Election Special (Part 2) as Stacey Abrams (ABC); Julie Andrews – Bridgerton: "Diamond of the First Water" as Lady Whistledown (Netflix); Tituss Burgess – Central Park: "A Fish Called Snakehead" as Cole Tillerman (Apple TV+); Seth MacFarlane – Family Guy: "Stewie's First Word" as Peter Griffin, Stewie Griffin, Brian Griffin, and Glenn Quagmire (Fox); Stanley Tucci – Central Park: "A Fish Called Snakehead" as Bitsy Brandenham (Apple TV+); Jessica Walter – Archer: "The Double Date" as Malory Archer (FX)	**Outstanding Narrator**: **Sterling K. Brown – Lincoln: Divided We Stand: "The Dogs of War" (CNN)**‡; David Attenborough – A Perfect Planet: "Volcano" (Discovery+); David Attenborough – The Year Earth Changed (Apple TV+); Anthony Hopkins – Mythic Quest: "Everlight" (Apple TV+); Sigourney Weaver – Secrets of the Whales: "Ocean Giants" (Disney+)
**Outstanding Host for a Reality or Competition Program**: **RuPaul – RuPaul's Drag Race (VH1)**‡; Bobby Berk, Karamo Brown, Tan France, Antoni Porowski, and Jonathan Van Ness – Queer Eye (Netflix); Nicole Byer – Nailed It! (Netflix); Mark Cuban, Barbara Corcoran, Lori Greiner, Robert Herjavec, Daymond John, and Kevin O'Leary – Shark Tank (ABC); Padma Lakshmi, Tom Colicchio, and Gail Simmons – Top Chef (Bravo)

=== Animation ===
Animation
**Outstanding Individual Achievement in Animation (Juried)**
- **Genndy Tartakovsky's Primal: "Plague of Madness" – David Krentz (Adult Swim)**‡
- **Love, Death & Robots: "All Through the House" – Daniel Gill (Netflix)**‡
- **Love, Death & Robots: "Automated Customer Service" – Laurent Nicolas (Netflix)**‡
- **Love, Death & Robots: "Ice" – Patricio Betteo (Netflix)**‡
- **Love, Death & Robots: "Ice" – Robert Valley (Netflix)**‡
- **The Simpsons: "Wad Goals" – Nik Ranieri (Fox)**‡

=== Art Direction ===
Art Direction
**Outstanding Production Design for a Narrative Contemporary Program (One Hour or More) (Area)**: **Mare of Easttown – Keith P. Cunningham, James F. Truesdale, Gina Cranham, Edward McLoughlin, and Sarah McMillan (HBO)**‡; The Flight Attendant: "After Dark" – Sara K White, Christine Foley, and Jessica Petruccelli (HBO Max); The Handmaid's Tale: "Chicago" – Elisabeth Williams, Martha Sparrow, Larry Spittle, and Rob Hepburn (Hulu); The Undoing – Lester Cohen, Doug Huszti, and Keri Lederman (HBO); Yellowstone: "Going Back to Cali" – Cary White, Yvonne Boudreaux, and Carla Curry (Paramount Network)	**Outstanding Production Design for a Narrative Period or Fantasy Program (One Hour or More) (Area)**: **The Queen's Gambit – Uli Hanisch, Kai Karla Koch, and Sabine Schaaf (Netflix)**‡; Bridgerton: "After the Rain" – Will Hughes-Jones, Dominic Devine, and Gina Cromwell (Netflix); The Crown: "War" – Martin Childs, Mark Raggett, and Alison Harvey (Netflix); Halston – Mark Ricker, Nithya Shrinivasan, and Cherish M. Hale (Netflix); The Mandalorian: "Chapter 13: The Jedi" – Andrew L. Jones, Doug Chiang, David Lazan, and Amanda Serino (Disney+); Perry Mason: "Chapter Three" – John Goldsmith, Chris Farmer, and Halina Siwolop (HBO)
**Outstanding Production Design for a Narrative Program (Half-Hour) (Area)**: **WandaVision – Mark Worthington, Sharon Davis, and Kathy Orlando (Disney+)**‡; Emily in Paris: "Emily in Paris" – Anne Seibel, Jean-Yves Rabier, and Christelle Maisonneuve (Netflix); Hacks: "Primm" – Jon Carlos, James Bolenbaugh, and Ellen Reede Dorros (HBO Max); Ted Lasso: "For the Children" – Paul Cripps and Iain White (Apple TV+); United States of Al: "Pilot" – John Shaffner, Daren Janes, and Susan Eschelbach (CBS)	**Outstanding Production Design for a Variety, Reality or Competition Series (Area)**: **Saturday Night Live: "Host: Kristen Wiig" – Eugene Lee, Akira Yoshimura, Keith Ian Raywood, N. Joseph DeTullio, and Melissa Shakun (NBC)**‡; Last Week Tonight with John Oliver: "Trump & Election Results / Fuck 2020" – Eric Morrell and Veronica Spink (HBO); The Late Show with Stephen Colbert: "Dr. Jon Lapook / Performance by Maroon 5" – Jim Fenhagen, Larry Hartman, Brendan Hurley, and Riley Mellon (CBS); The Masked Singer: "The Season Premiere – The Masks Return" – James Pearse Connelly, Ryan Suchor, and Lisa Nelson (Fox); RuPaul's Drag Race: "Condragulations" / "Bossy Rossy RuBoot" – James McGowan and Gianna Costa (VH1)
**Outstanding Production Design for a Variety Special (Area)**: **The Oscars – David Rockwell, Joe Celli, Alana Billingsley, and Jason Howard (ABC)**‡; Friends: The Reunion – John Shaffner, Greg Grande, and Daren Janes (HBO Max); 78th Annual Golden Globe Awards – Brian Stonestreet and John Zuiker (NBC); The 63rd Annual Grammy Awards – Misty Buckley, Kristen Merlino, Gloria Lamb, and Matt Steinbrenner (CBS); Stephen Colbert's Election Night 2020: Democracy's Last Stand Building Back America Great Again Better 2020 – Jim Fenhagen, Larry Hartman, Riley Mellon, and Brendan Hurley (Showtime)

=== Casting ===
Casting
**Outstanding Casting for a Comedy Series**: **Ted Lasso – Theo Park (Apple TV+)**‡; The Flight Attendant – Kim Miscia, Beth Bowling, and John Papsidera (HBO Max); Hacks – Jeanne McCarthy and Nicole Abellera Hallman (HBO Max); The Kominsky Method – Nikki Valko, Ken Miller, and Tara Treacy (Netflix); PEN15 – Melissa DeLizia (Hulu)	**Outstanding Casting for a Drama Series**: **The Crown – Robert Sterne (Netflix)**‡; Bridgerton – Kelly Valentine Hendry (Netflix); The Handmaid's Tale – Sharon Bialy, Sherry Thomas, Russell Scott, and Robin D. Cook (Hulu); Lovecraft Country – Kim Taylor-Coleman and Meagan Lewis (HBO); The Mandalorian – Sarah Halley Finn (Disney+)
**Outstanding Casting for a Limited or Anthology Series or Movie**: **The Queen's Gambit – Ellen Lewis, Kate Sprance, Olivia Scott-Webb, Tina Gerussi, Anna-Lena Slater, Tatjana Moutchnik, and Stephanie Maile (Netflix)**‡; I May Destroy You – Julie Harkin (HBO); Mare of Easttown – Avy Kaufman, Diane Heery, and Jason Loftus (HBO); The Underground Railroad – Francine Maisler and Meagan Lewis (Prime Video); WandaVision – Sarah Halley Finn and Jason B. Stamey (Disney+)	**Outstanding Casting for a Reality Program**: **RuPaul's Drag Race – Goloka Bolte and Ethan Petersen (VH1)**‡; Queer Eye – Danielle Gervais, Natalie Pino, MaryAnne Nicoletti, Pamela Vallarelli, and Ally Capriotti Grant (Netflix); Shark Tank – Mindy Zemrak, Jen Rosen, and Erica Brooks Hochberg (ABC); Top Chef – Ron Mare (Bravo); The Voice – Michelle McNulty, Holly Dale, and Courtney Burns (NBC)

=== Choreography ===
Choreography
**Outstanding Choreography for Variety or Reality Programming (Juried)**: **Dancing with the Stars: "Paso Doble – Uccen" / "Tap Dance – Let's Fall in Love for the Night" – Derek Hough (ABC)**‡; Christmas in Rockefeller Center: "Rudolph the Red-Nosed Reindeer" / "Christmas (Baby, Please Come Home)" – Sergio Trujillo (NBC); Dancing with the Stars: "Argentine Tango – Toxic" / "Freestyle – Sparkling Diamonds" – Artem Chigvintsev (ABC); The Disney Holiday Singalong: "Jingle Bells" – Derek Hough (ABC); Savage X Fenty Show Vol. 2: "Garden Scene" – Parris Goebel (Prime Video); World of Dance: "Come Thru" / "Superbad, Superslick" / "Bohemian Rhapsody" – Marie-Odile Haince-Lebel (NBC)	**Outstanding Choreography for Scripted Programming (Juried)**: **Dolly Parton's Christmas on the Square: "Christmas Is the Time" / "Dance Studio" / "High School Dance" / "Christmas on the Square Finale" – Debbie Allen (Netflix)**‡; Genius: Aretha: "Jump" / "Satisfaction" / "See Saw" – Dondraico Johnson (National Geographic); Lucifer: "Another One Bites the Dust" / "Hell" / "Bad to the Bone" – Brooke Lipton (Netflix); Zoey's Extraordinary Playlist: "Black Man in a White World" / "Tightrope" – Mandy Moore and Luther Brown (NBC); Zoey's Extraordinary Playlist: "Hello Dolly" / "Starships" / "Let's Get Loud" – Mandy Moore (NBC)

=== Cinematography ===
Cinematography
**Outstanding Cinematography for a Multi-Camera Series**: **Country Comfort: "Crazy" – George Mooradian (Netflix)**‡; Call Me Kat: "Plus One" – Patti Lee (Fox); The Conners: "A Stomach Ache, a Heartbreak and a Grave Mistake" – Donald A. Morgan (ABC); Last Man Standing: "Time Flies" – Donald A. Morgan (Fox); The Upshaws: "Big Plans" – Donald A. Morgan (Netflix)	**Outstanding Cinematography for a Single-Camera Series (Half-Hour)**: **The Mandalorian: "Chapter 15: The Believer" – Matthew Jensen (Disney+)**‡; Grown-ish: "Know Yourself" – Mark Doering-Powell (Freeform); Hacks: "Primm" – Adam Bricker (HBO Max); Made for Love: "User One" – Nathaniel Goodman (HBO Max); Servant: "2:00" – Marshall Adams (Apple TV+)
**Outstanding Cinematography for a Single-Camera Series (One Hour)**: **The Crown: "Fairytale" – Adriano Goldman (Netflix)**‡; Bridgerton: "Art of the Swoon" – Jeffrey Jur (Netflix); Euphoria: "Trouble Don't Last Always" – Marcell Rév (HBO); Lovecraft Country: "Sundown" – Tat Radcliffe (HBO); The Mandalorian: "Chapter 13: The Jedi" – Baz Idoine (Disney+); Perry Mason: "Chapter Two" – David Franco (HBO); The Umbrella Academy: "Right Back Where We Started" – Neville Kidd (Netflix)	**Outstanding Cinematography for a Limited or Anthology Series or Movie**: **The Queen's Gambit: "End Game" – Steven Meizler (Netflix)**‡; Fargo: "East/West" – Dana Gonzales (FX); Mare of Easttown: "Illusions" – Ben Richardson (HBO); Small Axe: "Mangrove" – Shabier Kirchner (Prime Video); The Underground Railroad: "Chapter 9: Indiana Winter" – James Laxton (Prime Video)
**Outstanding Cinematography for a Nonfiction Program**: **David Attenborough: A Life on Our Planet – Gavin Thurston (Netflix)**‡; City So Real: "Blood Sport" – Jackson James and Steve James (National Geographic); Dick Johnson Is Dead – Kirsten Johnson and John Wakayama Carey (Netflix); Rebuilding Paradise – Lincoln Else (National Geographic); Secrets of the Whales: "Ocean Giants" – Hayes Baxley, Andy Mitchell, Brian Armstrong, and Luis Lamar (Disney+); The Social Dilemma – John Behrens and Jonathan Pope (Netflix)	**Outstanding Cinematography for a Reality Program**: **Life Below Zero – Danny Day, John Griber, Simeon Houtman, Ben Mullin, Michael Cheeseman, David Lovejoy, Brian Bitterfeld, Tom Day, Jeffrey Alexander, and Joshua Fisch (National Geographic)**‡; The Amazing Race: "Give Me a Beard Bump" – Joshua Gitersonke, David D'Angelo, Alan Weeks, Ryan Shaw, Petr Cikhart, and Vincent Monteleone (CBS); Deadliest Catch – David Reichert, Jacob Tawney, Shane Moore, Dave Arnold, Nathan Garofalos, Todd Stanley, Bryan Miller, Kelvon Agee, Carson Doyle, Scott Messier, Charlie Beck, Josh Thomas, Tom Trainor, Nate Chambers, and Randy Lee (Discovery Channel); Queer Eye: "Groomer Has It" – Garrett Rose (Netflix); RuPaul's Drag Race – Michael Jacob Kerber, Jay Mack Arnette II, Jason Cooley, Pauline Edwards, Ade Oyebade, Marios Panagiotopoulos, Jon Schneider, Brett Smith, and Justin Umphenour (VH1)

=== Commercial ===
Commercial
**Outstanding Commercial**
- **"You Can't Stop Us" – Wieden+Kennedy and Pulse (Nike)**‡
  - "Airpods Pro — Jump" – TBWA\Media Arts Lab and Imperial Woodpecker (Apple AirPods)
  - "Alexa's Body" – Lucky Generals and Hungry Man (Amazon Alexa)
  - "Better | Mamba Forever" – Wieden+Kennedy and Prettybird (Nike)
  - "It Already Does That" – Apple and MJZ (Apple Watch Series 6)
  - "You Love Me" – Translation, LLC and Prettybird (Beats by Dre)

=== Costumes ===
Costumes
**Outstanding Period Costumes (Area)**: **The Queen's Gambit: "End Game" – Gabriele Binder, Gina Krauss, Katrin Hoffmann, Nanrose Buchman, and Sparka Lee Hall (Netflix)**‡; Bridgerton: "Diamond of the First Water" – Ellen Mirojnick, John W. Glaser III, Sanaz Missaghian, and Kenny Crouch (Netflix); The Crown: "Terra Nullius" – Amy Roberts, Sidonie Roberts, and Giles Gale (Netflix); Halston: "Versailles" – Jeriana San Juan, Catherine Crabtree, Cailey Breneman, and Anne Newton-Harding (Netflix); Ratched: "Pilot" – Lou Eyrich, Rebecca Guzzi, Allison Agler, and Betsy Glick (Netflix)	**Outstanding Fantasy/Sci-Fi Costumes (Area)**: **WandaVision: "Filmed Before a Live Studio Audience" – Mayes C. Rubeo, Joseph Feltus, Daniel Selon, and Virginia Burton (Disney+)**‡; The Handmaid's Tale: "Nightshade" – Debra Hanson, Jane Flanders, and Darci Cheyne (Hulu); Lovecraft Country: "I Am." – Dayna Pink, Zachary Sheets, and Terry Anderson (HBO); The Mandalorian: "Chapter 13: The Jedi" – Shawna Trpcic, Julie Robar, and Sara Fox (Disney+); The Umbrella Academy: "The Frankel Footage" – Christopher Hargadon, Heather Crepp, William Ng, and Jane Fieber (Netflix)
**Outstanding Contemporary Costumes (Area)**: **Pose: "Series Finale" – Analucia McGorty, Michelle Roy, and Linda Giammarese (FX)**‡; Black-ish: "Our Wedding Dre" – Michelle R. Cole and Juliann M. Smith DeVito (ABC); Euphoria: "Fuck Anyone Who's Not a Sea Blob" – Heidi Bivens, Devon Patterson, and Angelina Vitto (HBO); Hacks: "There Is No Line" – Kathleen Felix-Hager and Karen Bellamy (HBO Max); I May Destroy You: "Social Media Is a Great Way to Connect" – Lynsey Moore, Rosie Lack, and Debbie Roberts (HBO); Mare of Easttown: "Miss Lady Hawk Herself" – Meghan Kasperlik, Francisco Stoll, Taylor Smith, Laura Downing, and Jennifer Hryniw (HBO); The Politician: "New York State of Mind" – Claire Parkinson, Lily Parkinson, James Hammer, and Laura Steinman (Netflix)	**Outstanding Costumes for Variety, Nonfiction, or Reality Programming (Juried)**: **Black Is King – Zerina Akers and Timothy White (Disney+)**‡; **The Masked Singer: "Super 8 – The Plot Chickens! Part 2" – Marina Toybina, Grainne O'Sullivan, Gabrielle Letamendi, and Lucia Maldonado (Fox)**‡; **Sherman's Showcase Black History Month Spectacular – Ariyela Wald-Cohain, Patty Malkin, and Erica D. Schwartz (IFC)**‡

=== Directing ===
Directing
**Outstanding Directing for a Variety Series**: **Saturday Night Live: "Host: Dave Chappelle" – Don Roy King (NBC)**‡; Last Week Tonight with John Oliver: "Trump & Election Results / Fuck 2020" – Christopher Werner (HBO); Late Night with Seth Meyers: "Episode 1085a" – Alexander J. Vietmeier (NBC); The Late Show with Stephen Colbert: "Live Show Following Capitol Insurrection; Senator Amy Klobuchar, Rep. Adam Kinzinger, Performance by Jamila Woods" – Jim Hoskinson (CBS); Real Time with Bill Maher: "Episode 1835" – Paul G. Casey (HBO)	**Outstanding Directing for a Variety Special**: **Bo Burnham: Inside – Bo Burnham (Netflix)**‡; David Byrne's American Utopia – Spike Lee (HBO); 8:46 – Dave Chappelle – Julia Reichert, Steven Bognar, and Dave Chappelle (Netflix); Friends: The Reunion – Ben Winston (HBO Max); A West Wing Special to Benefit When We All Vote – Thomas Schlamme (HBO Max)
**Outstanding Directing for a Documentary/Nonfiction Program**: **Dick Johnson Is Dead – Kirsten Johnson (Netflix)**‡; Allen v. Farrow: "Episode 3" – Kirby Dick and Amy Ziering (HBO); The Bee Gees: How Can You Mend a Broken Heart – Frank Marshall (HBO); Boys State – Amanda McBaine and Jesse Moss (Apple TV+); The Social Dilemma – Jeff Orlowski (Netflix); Tina – Dan Lindsay and T. J. Martin (HBO)	**Outstanding Directing for a Reality Program**: **RuPaul's Drag Race: "Gettin' Lucky" – Nick Murray (VH1)**‡; The Amazing Race: "Give Me a Beard Bump" – Bertram van Munster (CBS); Queer Eye: "Preaching Out Loud" – Mark Perez (Netflix); Top Chef: "Pan African Portland" – Ari Boles (Bravo); The Voice: "The Blind Auditions Premiere" – Alan Carter (NBC)

=== Hairstyling ===
Hairstyling
**Outstanding Contemporary Hairstyling**: **Pose: "Series Finale" – Barry Lee Moe, Timothy Harvey, Gregory Bazemore, Tene' Wilder, Lisa Thomas, and Rob Harmon (FX)**‡; Black-ish: "Our Wedding Dre" – Nena Ross Davis, Ka'Maura Eley, Stacey Morris, Enoch Williams IV, Robert C. Mathews III, and Marcia Hamilton (ABC); The Handmaid's Tale: "Vows" – Paul Elliot and Franchi Pir (Hulu); Mare of Easttown: "Sore Must Be the Storm" – Shunika Terry, Lawrence Davis, Lydia Benaim, and Ivana Primorac (HBO); The Politician: "What's in the Box?" – Liliana Maggio, Timothy Harvey, Lisa Thomas, Josh First, and Matthew Wilson (Netflix)	**Outstanding Period and/or Character Hairstyling (Area)**: **Bridgerton: "Art of the Swoon" – Marc Pilcher, Lynda J. Pearce, Claire Matthews, Adam James Phillips, Tania Couper, and Lou Bannell (Netflix)**‡; The Crown: "War" – Cate Hall, Emilie Yong Mills, Sam Smart, Suzanne David, Debbie Ormrod, and Stacey Louise Holman (Netflix); The Mandalorian: "Chapter 16: The Rescue" – Maria Sandoval, Ashleigh Childers, and Wendy Southard (Disney+); Ratched: "The Dance" – Chris Clark, Natalie Driscoll, Dawn Victoria Dudley, Michelle Ceglia, George Guzman, and Helena Cepeda (Netflix); WandaVision: "Don't Touch That Dial" – Karen Bartek, Cindy Welles, Nikki Wright, Anna Quinn, and Yvonne Kupka (Disney+)
**Outstanding Contemporary Hairstyling for a Variety, Nonfiction or Reality Program**: **Saturday Night Live: "Host: Maya Rudolph" – Jodi Mancuso, Cara Hannah, Inga Thrasher, Joe Whitmeyer, Amanda Duffy Evans, and Gina Ferrucci (NBC)**‡; Dancing with the Stars: "Finale" – Kimi Messina, Gail Ryan, Jani Kleinbard, Amber Maher, Roma Goddard, Regina Rodriguez, Megg Massey, and Arrick Anderson (ABC); Legendary: "Pop Tart" – Jerilynn Stephens, Kimi Messina, Dean Banowetz, Kathleen Leonard, Suzette Boozer, Dwayne Ross, Tamara Tripp, and Johnny Lomeli (HBO Max); RuPaul's Drag Race: "The Pork Chop" – Curtis Foreman and Ryan Randall (VH1); The Voice: "Live Top 17 Performances" – Jerilynn Stephens, Amber Maher, Kimi Messina, Dean Banowetz, Dwayne Ross, Regina Rodriguez, Stacey Morris, and Robert Ramos (NBC)

=== Lighting Design / Lighting Direction ===
Lighting Design and Lighting Direction
**Outstanding Lighting Design / Lighting Direction for a Variety Series**: **Saturday Night Live: "Host: Adele" – Geoffrey Amoral, Rick McGuinness, William McGuinness, Trevor Brown, and Tim Stasse (NBC)**‡; America's Got Talent: "The Finals" – Noah Mitz, Michael Berger, William Gossett, Matt Benson, Ryan Tanker, Patrick Brazil, Patrick Boozer, and Scott Chmielewski (NBC); Dancing with the Stars: "Finale" – Tom Sutherland, Joe Holdman, Alexander Taylor, Nathan Files, and Matt McAdam (ABC); The Masked Singer: "The Spicy 6 – The Competition Heats Up!" – Simon Miles, Cory Fournier, and Maurice Dupleasis (Fox); The Voice: "Live Top 17 Performances" – Oscar Dominguez, Ronald Wirsgalla, Andrew Munie, Daniel K. Boland, and Tiffany Spicer Keys (NBC)	**Outstanding Lighting Design / Lighting Direction for a Variety Special**: **David Byrne's American Utopia – Rob Sinclair and Brian Spett (HBO)**‡; Friends: The Reunion – Noah Mitz, Madigan Stehly, Russell Fine, Lynn Costa, and Patrick Boozer (HBO Max); The 63rd Annual Grammy Awards – Noah Mitz, Madigan Stehly, Andy O'Reilly, Patrick Boozer, William Gossett, Ryan Tanker, and Matthew Cotter (CBS); The Oscars – Robert A. Dickinson, Noah Mitz, Michael Berger, Ben Green, Andy O'Reilly, and Patrick Boozer (ABC); The Pepsi Super Bowl LV Halftime Show Starring The Weeknd – Al Gurdon, Ben Green, Jeff Nellis, Mark Humphrey, Eric Marchwinski, Jason Rudolph, and Alen Sisul (CBS)

=== Main Title and Motion Design ===
Main Title and Motion Design
**Outstanding Main Title Design**: **The Good Lord Bird – Efrain Montanez, Eduardo Guisandes, and Abigail Fairfax (Showtime)**‡; Between the World and Me – Hazel Baird, Diego Coutinho de Souza, and Rafael Morinaga (HBO); Lovecraft Country – Patrick Clair, Raoul Marks, and Ken Taylor (HBO); The Queen's Gambit – Saskia Marka and David Whyte (Netflix); Raised by Wolves – Steve Small (HBO Max); WandaVision – John LePore, Doug Appleton, Nick Woythaler, Alex Rupert, and David Wave (Disney+)	**Outstanding Motion Design (Juried)**: **Calls – Alexei Tylevich, Ethan Stickley, Scott Ulrich, Daisuke Goto, Chi Hong, and James Connelly (Apple TV+)**‡

=== Makeup ===
Makeup
**Outstanding Contemporary Makeup (Non-Prosthetic)**: **Pose: "Series Finale" – Sherri Berman Laurence, Nicky Pattison Illum, Charles Zambrano, Shaun Thomas Gibson, Jessica Padilla, and Jennifer Suarez (FX)**‡; Euphoria: "Fuck Anyone Who's Not a Sea Blob" – Doniella Davy and Tara Lang Shah (HBO); The Handmaid's Tale: "Pigs" – Burton LeBlanc and Alastair Muir (Hulu); Mare of Easttown: "Sore Must Be the Storm" – Debi Young, Sandra Linn, Ngozi Olandu Young, and Rachel Geary (HBO); The Politician: "What's in the Box?" – Sherri Berman Laurence, Nicky Pattison Illum, Charles Zambrano, Oslyn Holder, and Amy Duskin (Netflix)	**Outstanding Period and/or Character Makeup (Non-Prosthetic) (Area)**: **The Queen's Gambit: "Adjournment" – Daniel Parker (Netflix)**‡; Halston: "Versailles" – Patricia Regan, Claus Lulla, Margot Boccia, and Joseph A. Campayno (Netflix); Ratched: "Pilot" – Eryn Krueger Mekash, Kim Ayers, Mike Mekash, and Silvina Knight (Netflix); Star Trek: Discovery: "Terra Firma, Part 2" – Shauna Llewellyn and Faye Crasto (Paramount+); WandaVision: "Filmed Before a Live Studio Audience" – Tricia Sawyer, Vasilios Tanis, Jonah Levy, and Regina Little (Disney+)
**Outstanding Contemporary Makeup for a Variety, Nonfiction or Reality Program (Non-Prosthetic)**: **Saturday Night Live: "Host: Elon Musk" – Louie Zakarian, Amy Tagliamonti, Chris Milone, Jason Milani, Kim Weber, Joanna Pisani, and Young Beck (NBC)**‡; Dancing with the Stars: "Top 11" – Zena S. Green, Julie Socash, Donna Bard, Sarah Woolf, Alison Gladieux, Victor Del Castillo, Rosetta Garcia, and Lois Harriman (ABC); Legendary: "Pop Tart" – Tonia Green, Tyson Fountaine, Silvia Leczel, Jennifer Fregozo, Glen Alen Gutierrez, Sean Conklin, Valente Frazier, and Marcel Banks (HBO Max); Mariah Carey's Magical Christmas Special – Bruce Grayson, Angela Moos, James Mackinnon, Kristofer Buckle, Deborah Huss-Humphries, and Julie Socash (Apple TV+); RuPaul's Drag Race: "The Pork Chop" – David "Raven" Petruschin, Nicole Faulkner, and Jen Fregozo (VH1)	**Outstanding Prosthetic Makeup (Area)**: **The Mandalorian: "Chapter 13: The Jedi" – Brian Sipe, Alexei Dmitriew, Samantha Ward, Scott Stoddard, Pepe Mora, Cale Thomas, Carlton Coleman, and Scott Patton (Disney+)**‡; Lovecraft Country: "Sundown" – J. Anthony Kosar and Anna Cali (HBO); Pose: "On the Run" – Thomas Denier Jr. (FX); Star Trek: Discovery: "That Hope Is You, Part 1" – Glenn Hetrick, Mike Smithson, Michael O'Brien, Ken Culver, Hugo Villasenor, and Chris Bridges (Paramount+); This Is Us: "There" – Stephen Bettles and Elizabeth Hoel-Chang (NBC)

=== Music ===
Music
**Outstanding Music Composition for a Series (Original Dramatic Score)**: **The Mandalorian: "Chapter 16: The Rescue" – Ludwig Göransson (Disney+)**‡; Bridgerton: "Diamond of the First Water" – Kris Bowers (Netflix); The Crown: "The Balmoral Test" – Martin Phipps (Netflix); The Handmaid's Tale: "The Crossing" – Adam Taylor (Hulu); Lovecraft Country: "Rewind 1921" – Laura Karpman and Raphael Saadiq (HBO); This Is Us: "Birth Mother" – Siddhartha Khosla (NBC)	**Outstanding Music Composition for a Limited or Anthology Series, Movie or Special (Original Dramatic Score)**: **The Queen's Gambit: "End Game" – Carlos Rafael Rivera (Netflix)**‡; Fargo: "East/West" – Jeff Russo (FX); Oslo – Jeff Russo and Zoë Keating (HBO); The Underground Railroad: "Chapter 2: South Carolina" – Nicholas Britell (Prime Video); WandaVision: "Previously On" – Christophe Beck (Disney+)
**Outstanding Music Composition for a Documentary Series or Special (Original Dramatic Score)**: **David Attenborough: A Life on Our Planet – Steven Price (Netflix)**‡; Allen v. Farrow: "Episode 4" – Michael Abels (HBO); American Masters: "Amy Tan: Unintended Memoir" – Kathryn Bostic (PBS); The Social Dilemma – Mark Crawford (Netflix); Tulsa Burning: The 1921 Race Massacre – Branford Marsalis (History)	**Outstanding Music Direction**: **Bo Burnham: Inside – Bo Burnham (Netflix)**‡; Billie Eilish: The World's a Little Blurry – Aron Forbes (Apple TV+); Celebrating America – An Inauguration Night Special – Rickey Minor (Multiple Platforms); David Byrne's American Utopia – Karl Mansfield and Mauro Refosco (HBO); Zoey's Extraordinary Playlist: "Zoey's Extraordinary Goodbye" – Harvey Mason Jr. (NBC)
**Outstanding Original Music and Lyrics**: **WandaVision: "Breaking the Fourth Wall" – "Agatha All Along" by Kristen Anderson-Lopez and Robert Lopez (Disney+)**‡; Bo Burnham: Inside – "Comedy" by Bo Burnham (Netflix); The Boys: "The Big Ride" – "Never Truly Vanish" by Christopher Lennertz and Michael Saltzman (Prime Video); The Queen's Gambit: "Adjournment" – "I Can't Remember Love" by Anna Hauss, Robert Wienröder, and William Horberg (Netflix); Soundtrack of Our Lives – "The End Titles" by Marc Shaiman (YouTube); Zoey's Extraordinary Playlist: "Zoey's Extraordinary Birthday" – "Crimson Love" by Harvey Mason Jr., Andrew Hey, Austin Winsberg, and Lindsey Rosin (NBC)	**Outstanding Original Main Title Theme Music**: **The Flight Attendant – Blake Neely (HBO Max)**‡; Allen v. Farrow – Michael Abels (HBO); Bridgerton – Kris Bowers and Michael Dean Parsons (Netflix); Ted Lasso – Marcus Mumford and Tom Howe (Apple TV+); WandaVision – Kristen Anderson-Lopez and Robert Lopez (Disney+)
**Outstanding Music Supervision**: **I May Destroy You: "Ego Death" – Ciara Elwis and Matt Biffa (HBO)**‡; Bridgerton: "Diamond of the First Water" – Alexandra Patsavas (Netflix); The Crown: "Fairytale" – Sarah Bridge (Netflix); Halston: "The Party's Over" – Amanda Krieg Thomas, Alexis Martin Woodall, and Ryan Murphy (Netflix); Lovecraft Country: "Strange Case" – Liza Richardson (HBO); The Queen's Gambit: "Adjournment" – Randall Poster (Netflix); WandaVision: "Don't Touch That Dial" – Dave Jordan and Shannon Murphy (Disney+)

=== Picture Editing ===
Picture Editing
**Outstanding Single-Camera Picture Editing for a Drama Series**: **The Crown: "Fairytale" – Yan Miles (Netflix)**‡; The Crown: "Avalanche" – Paulo Pandolpho (Netflix); The Handmaid's Tale: "The Crossing" – Wendy Hallam Martin (Hulu); The Mandalorian: "Chapter 11: The Heiress" – Dylan Firshein and J. Erik Jessen (Disney+); The Mandalorian: "Chapter 13: The Jedi" – Andrew S. Eisen (Disney+); The Mandalorian: "Chapter 15: The Believer" – Jeff Seibenick (Disney+); The Mandalorian: "Chapter 16: The Rescue" – Adam Gerstel (Disney+)	**Outstanding Single-Camera Picture Editing for a Comedy Series**: **Ted Lasso: "The Hope That Kills You" – A.J. Catoline (Apple TV+)**‡; The Flight Attendant: "In Case of Emergency" – Heather Persons (HBO Max); Hacks: "Primm" – Susan Vaill (HBO Max); Hacks: "There Is No Line" – Jessica Brunetto (HBO Max); Hacks: "Tunnel of Love" – Ali Greer (HBO Max); Ted Lasso: "Make Rebecca Great Again" – Melissa McCoy (Apple TV+)
**Outstanding Multi-Camera Picture Editing for a Comedy Series**: **The Conners: "Jeopardé, Sobrieté and Infidelité" – Brian Schnuckel (ABC)**‡; Man with a Plan: "Driving Miss Katie" – Sue Federman (CBS); Mom: "Scooby-Doo Checks and Salisbury Steak" – Joe Bella (CBS)	**Outstanding Single-Camera Picture Editing for a Limited or Anthology Series or Movie**: **The Queen's Gambit: "Exchanges" – Michelle Tesoro (Netflix)**‡; Mare of Easttown: "Fathers" – Amy E. Duddleston and Naomi Sunrise Filoramo (HBO); Mare of Easttown: "Miss Lady Hawk Herself" – Amy E. Duddleston (HBO); WandaVision: "On a Very Special Episode..." – Nona Khodai (Disney+); WandaVision: "The Series Finale" – Zene Baker, Michael A. Webber, Tim Roche, and Nona Khodai (Disney+)
**Outstanding Picture Editing for Variety Programming (Area)**: **A Black Lady Sketch Show: "Sister, May I Call You Oshun?" – Daysha Broadway, Stephanie Filo, and Jessica Hernández (HBO)**‡; Bo Burnham: Inside – Bo Burnham (Netflix); Hamilton – Jonah Moran (Disney+); Last Week Tonight with John Oliver: "Trump & Election Results / Fuck 2020" – Ryan Barger and Anthony Miale (HBO); Saturday Night Live: "Murder Show" – Ryan Spears (NBC); Saturday Night Live: "Stu" – Ryan McIlraith (NBC)	**Outstanding Picture Editing for a Nonfiction Program**: **The Social Dilemma – Davis Coombe (Netflix)**‡; Allen v. Farrow: "Episode 1" – Mikaela Shwer, Parker Laramie, and Sara Newens (HBO); The Bee Gees: How Can You Mend a Broken Heart – Derek Boonstra and Robert A. Martinez (HBO); Billie Eilish: The World's a Little Blurry – Greg Finton, Lindsay Utz, and Azin Samari (Apple TV+); David Attenborough: A Life on Our Planet – Martin Elsbury and Charles Dyer (Netflix); Framing Britney Spears (The New York Times Presents) – Geoff O'Brien and Pierre Takal (FX); Q: Into the Storm: "The Storm" – Tom Patterson, David Tillman, Cullen Hoback, Ted Woerner, and Evan Wise (HBO)
**Outstanding Picture Editing for a Structured Reality or Competition Program**: **RuPaul's Drag Race: "Condragulations" – Jamie Martin, Paul Cross, Ryan Mallick, and Michael Roha (VH1)**‡; The Amazing Race – Eric Beetner, Michael Bolanowski, Kellen Cruden, Christina Fontana, Jay Gammill, Katherine Griffin, Jason Groothuis, Darrick Lazo, Ryan Leamy, Joshua Lowry, Gary Pennington, and Jason Pedroza (CBS); Queer Eye: "Preaching Out Loud" – Kris Byrnes, Susan Maridueña Barrett, Nathan Ochiltree, Tony Zajkowski, Carlos J. Gamarra, and Brian Ray (Netflix); Top Chef: "Restaurant Wars" – Steve Lichtenstein, Mike Abitz, Ericka Concha, Tim Daniel, George Dybas, Eric Lambert, Matt Reynolds, Daniel Ruiz, and Dan Williams (Bravo); The Voice – John M. Larson, Robert Michael Malachowski Jr., Hudson H. Smith III, Matt Antell, John Baldino, Sommer Basinger, Matthew Blair, Melissa Silva Borden, William Fabian Castro, Andrew Ciancia, Nick Don Vito, Alyssa Dressman Lehner, Glen Ebesu, Noel A. Guerra, John Homesley, Omega Hsu, Charles A. Kramer, Terri Maloney, James J. Munoz, Andy Perez, Robby Thompson, and Eric Wise (NBC)	**Outstanding Picture Editing for an Unstructured Reality Program**: **Life Below Zero: "The Other Side" – Tony Diaz, Matt Edwards, Jennifer Nelson, Eric Michael Schrader, and Michael Swingler (National Geographic)**‡; Below Deck: "Steamy Vibes" – Garrett Hohendorf, Cameron Teisher, Michael Sparks, Josh Franco, Allison Anastasio, Drew Whitaker, Kimberly Fennik, Lane Gillis, and Tom McCudden (Bravo); Deadliest Catch – Rob Butler, Isaiah Camp, Joe Mikan, Art O'Leary, Alexander Rubinow, Ben Bulatao, Alexandra Moore, Nico Natale, Alberto Perez, and Chris Courtner (Discovery Channel); Naked and Afraid: "Sand Trapped" – Eric Goldfarb, Morgen Stary, Todd Beabout, PJ Wolff, Igor Borovac, Felise Epstein, and Michael Russell (Discovery Channel); RuPaul's Drag Race: Untucked: "The Bag Ball" – Kellen Cruden, Yali Sharon, and Shayna Casey (VH1)

=== Sound Editing ===
Sound Editing
**Outstanding Sound Editing for a Comedy or Drama Series (One Hour)**: **Lovecraft Country: "Sundown" – Tim Kimmel, John Matter, Paula Fairfield, Bradley Katona, Brett Voss, Jeff Lingle, Jason Lingle, Jeffrey Wilhoit, and Dylan Tuomy-Wilhoit (HBO)**‡; The Falcon and the Winter Soldier: "One World, One People" – Matthew Wood, Bonnie Wild, James Spencer, Richard Quinn, Steve Slanec, Kimberly Patrick, Teresa Eckton, Frank Rinella, Devon Kelley, Larry Oatfield, Anele Onyekwere, Dan Pinder, Ronni Brown, and Andrea Gard (Disney+); The Mandalorian: "Chapter 13: The Jedi" – Matthew Wood, David Acord, Richard Quinn, James Spencer, Benjamin A. Burtt, J. R. Grubbs, Richard Gould, Stephanie McNally, Ronni Brown, and Jana Vance (Disney+); Star Trek: Discovery: "That Hope Is You (Part 1)" – Matthew E. Taylor, Sean Heissinger, Tim Farrell, Harry Cohen, Michael Schapiro, Darrin Mann, Clay Weber, Moira Marquis, Alyson Dee Moore, and Chris Moriana (Paramount+); The Umbrella Academy: "The End of Something" – John Benson, Jason Krane, John Snider, AJ Shapiro, Dario Biscaldi, Lodge Worster, Lindsay Pepper, and Zane D. Bruce (Netflix)	**Outstanding Sound Editing for a Comedy or Drama Series (Half-Hour) and Animation**: **Love, Death & Robots: "Snow in the Desert" – Brad North, Craig Henighan, Dawn Lunsford, Jeff Charbonneau, and Alicia Stevenson (Netflix)**‡; Cobra Kai: "December 19" – Patrick Hogan, Jesse Pomeroy, Daniel Salas, Ryne Gierke, AJ Shapiro, Andres Locsey, Shane Bruce, and Mitchell Kohen (Netflix); Mythic Quest: "Everlight" – Matthew E. Taylor, Sean Heissinger, Pete Nichols, Matthew Wilson, David Jobe, Joe Deveau, Jody Holwadel Thomas, and Elizabeth Rainey (Apple TV+); Star Trek: Lower Decks: "No Small Parts" – James Lucero, James Singleton, Jeff Halbert, Michael Britt, and Amber Funk (Paramount+); Ted Lasso: "The Hope That Kills You" – Brent Findley, Bernard Weiser, Kip Smedley, Richard David Brown, Sharyn Gersh, Jordan McClain, Sanaa Kelley, and Matt Salib (Apple TV+)
**Outstanding Sound Editing for a Limited or Anthology Series, Movie or Special**: **The Queen's Gambit: "End Game" – Gregg Swiatlowski, Eric Hirsch, Wylie Stateman, Leo Marcil, Mary Ellen Porto, Patrick Cicero, James David Redding III, Eric Hoehn, Tom Kramer, and Rachel Chancey (Netflix)**‡; Fargo: "East/West" – Kurt Nicholas Forshager, Tim Boggs, Todd Niesen, Matt Temple, Adam Parrish King, Brad Bakelmun, Ben Schor, Stef Fraticelli, and Jason Charbonneau (FX); The Haunting of Bly Manor: "The Two Faces (Part Two)" – Trevor Gates, Jason Dotts, Kristen Hirlinger, Paul B. Knox, Piero Mura, James Miller, Matthew Thomas Hall, Mark Coffey, Ryan Meadows, Amy Barber, Julia Huberman, Brett "Snacky" Pierce, Jonathan Bruce, and Ben Parker (Netflix); The Underground Railroad: "Chapter 9: Indiana Winter" – Onnalee Blank, Chris Kahwaty, Katy Wood, Bryan Parker, Jason W. Jennings, Harry Cohen, Luke Gibleon, Pietu Korhonen, Lars Halvorsen, John Finklea, and Heikki Kossi (Prime Video); WandaVision: "The Series Finale" – Gwendolyn Yates Whittle, Kim Foscato, James Spencer, Chris Gridley, Steve Orlando, Scott Guitteau, Jon Borland, Samson Neslund, Richard Gould, Jordan Myers, Luke Dunn Gielmuda, Greg Peterson, Fernand Bos, Anele Onyekwere, Ronni Brown, and Shelley Roden (Disney+)	**Outstanding Sound Editing for a Nonfiction or Reality Program (Single or Multi-Camera)**: **The Bee Gees: How Can You Mend a Broken Heart – Jonathan Greber and Pascal Garneau (HBO)**‡; Allen v. Farrow: "Episode 2" – Dane A. Davis, Stephanie Flack, Jon Michaels, Ezra Dweck, and Ellen Segal (HBO); Billie Eilish: The World's a Little Blurry – Richard E. Yawn, Rob Getty, Steven Avila, Shawn Kennelly, Michael Brake, Melissa Kennelly, and Vince Nicastro (Apple TV+); David Attenborough: A Life on Our Planet – Tim Owens, Kate Hopkins, Tom Mercer, Gareth Cousins, and Paul Ackerman (Netflix); The Social Dilemma – Richard Gould, James Spencer, and Andrea Gard (Netflix); Tulsa Burning: The 1921 Race Massacre – John Moros (History)

=== Sound Mixing ===
Sound Mixing
**Outstanding Sound Mixing for a Comedy or Drama Series (One Hour)**: **The Mandalorian: "Chapter 13: The Jedi" – Bonnie Wild, Stephen Urata, Shawn Holden, and Chris Fogel (Disney+)**‡; The Boys: "What I Know" – Alexandra Fehrman, Rich Weingart, and Thomas Hayek (Prime Video); The Crown: "Fairytale" – Lee Walpole, Stuart Hilliker, Martin Jensen, and Chris Ashworth (Netflix); The Handmaid's Tale: "Chicago" – Lou Solakofski, Joe Morrow, and Sylvain Arseneault (Hulu); Lovecraft Country: "Sundown" – Marc Fishman, Mathew Waters, and Amanda Beggs (HBO)	**Outstanding Sound Mixing for a Limited or Anthology Series or Movie**: **The Queen's Gambit: "End Game" – Eric Hirsch, Eric Hoehn, Roland Winke, and Lawrence Manchester (Netflix)**‡; Genius: Aretha: "Respect" – Dan Brennan, Ken Hahn, and Jay Meagher (National Geographic); Mare of Easttown: "Sore Must Be the Storm" – Joe DeAngelis, Chris Carpenter, and Richard Bullock (HBO); The Underground Railroad: "Chapter 1: Georgia" – Onnalee Blank, Mathew Waters, Joe White, and Kari Vähäkuopus (Prime Video); WandaVision: "The Series Finale" – Danielle Dupre, Chris Giles, Doc Kane, and Casey Stone (Disney+)
**Outstanding Sound Mixing for a Comedy or Drama Series (Half-Hour) and Animation (Area)**: **Ted Lasso: "The Hope That Kills You" – Ryan Kennedy, Sean Byrne, and David Lascelles (Apple TV+)**‡; B Positive: "High Risk Factor" – Bob La Masney and Jeff A. Johnson (CBS); Cobra Kai: "December 19" – Joe DeAngelis, Chris Carpenter, Mike Filosa, and Phil McGowan (Netflix); Hacks: "Falling" – John W. Cook II, Ben Wilkins, and Jim Lakin (HBO Max); The Kominsky Method: "Chapter 21. Near, far, wherever you are" – Yuri Reese, Sean Madsen, and Brian Wittle (Netflix)	**Outstanding Sound Mixing for a Variety Series or Special (Area)**: **David Byrne's American Utopia – Paul Hsu, Michael Lonsdale, and Pete Keppler (HBO)**‡; Bruce Springsteen's Letter to You – Kevin O'Connell, Kyle Arzt, Brad Bergbom, and Bob Clearmountain (Apple TV+); Hamilton – Tony Volante, Roberto Fernandez, Tim Latham, and Justin Rathbun (Disney+); Last Week Tonight with John Oliver: "Trump & Election Results / Fuck 2020" – Siara Spreen, Eleanor Osborne, and Lewis Goldstein (HBO); The Late Show with Stephen Colbert: "Live Show Following Capitol Insurrection; Senator Amy Klobuchar, Rep. Adam Kinzinger, Performance by Jamila Woods" – Pierre de Laforcade, Harvey Goldberg, and Alan Bonomo (CBS)
**Outstanding Sound Mixing for a Nonfiction or Reality Program (Single or Multi-Camera) (Area)**: **David Attenborough: A Life on Our Planet – Graham Wild (Netflix)**‡; The Bee Gees: How Can You Mend a Broken Heart – Gary A. Rizzo, Jeff King, and John Rampey (HBO); Billie Eilish: The World's a Little Blurry – Elmo Ponsdomenech, Jason "Frenchie" Gaya, Aron Forbes, and Jae Kim (Apple TV+); Life Below Zero: "The Other Side" – Tony Crowe (National Geographic); Stanley Tucci: Searching for Italy: "Naples and the Amalfi Coast" – Tom O'Pray and Chris Gibbions (CNN); Tina – Lawrence Everson and Phil McGowan (HBO)

=== Special Visual Effects ===
Special Visual Effects
**Outstanding Special Visual Effects in a Season or a Movie**: **The Mandalorian – Joe Bauer, Richard Bluff, Abbigail Keller, Hal Hickel, Roy Cancino, John Knoll, Enrico Damm, John Rosengrant, and Joseph Kasparian (Disney+)**‡; The Boys – Stephan Fleet, Shalena Oxley-Butler, Kat Greene, Rian McNamara, Tony Kenny, Steve Moncur, Julian Hutchens, Anthony Paterson, and Keith Sellers (Prime Video); The Falcon and the Winter Soldier – Eric Leven, Mike May, John Haley, Daniel Mellitz, Chris Waegner, Charles Tait, Sébastien Francoeur, Chris Morley, and Mark LeDoux (Disney+); Lovecraft Country – Kevin Blank, Robin Griffin-McLachlan, Francois Dumoulin, Pietro Ponti, Grant Walker, J.D. Schwalm, Robert C. Rhodes, Kevin McAllister, and Paige Prokop (HBO); WandaVision – Tara DeMarco, James Alexander, Sarah Eim, Sandra Balej, David Allen, Marion Spates, Steve Moncur, Julien Hery, and Ryan Freer (Disney+)	**Outstanding Special Visual Effects in a Single Episode (Area)**: **Star Trek: Discovery: "Su'Kal" – Jason Michael Zimmerman, Ante Dekovic, Aleksandra Kochoska, Charles Collyer, Alexander Wood, Ivan Kondrup Jensen, Kristen Prahl, Toni Pykäläniemi, and Leslie Chung (Paramount+)**‡; The Crown: "Gold Stick" – Ben Turner, Reece Ewing, Andrew Scrase, Standish Millennas, Oliver Bersey, Jonathan Wood, David Fleet, Joe Cork, and Garrett Honn (Netflix); The Nevers: "Ignition" – Johnny Han, Jack Geist, Justin Mitchell, Dominique Vidal, Emanuel Fuchs, Gaia Bussolati, Alexandre Prod'homme, Takashi Takeoka, and Mike Dawson (HBO); The Umbrella Academy: "743" – Everett Burrell, Phillip Hoffman, Jesse Kawzenuk, Christopher Stack, Sophie Vertigan, Jeff Campbell, Laurent Spillemaecker, R. Christopher White, and Ryan Freer (Netflix); Vikings: "The Signal" – Dominic Remane, Bill Halliday, Leann Harvey, Becca Donohoe, Tom Morrison, Ovidiu Cinazan, Jim Maxwell, Kieran McKay, and Warren Lawtey (Prime Video)

=== Stunts ===
Stunt Coordination
**Outstanding Stunt Coordination**: **The Mandalorian – Ryan Watson (Disney+)**‡; Doom Patrol – Thom Williams (HBO Max); The Falcon and the Winter Soldier – Hank Amos and Dave Macomber (Disney+); S.W.A.T. – Austen Brewer and Charlie Brewer (CBS); Warrior – Brett Chan (HBO Max)	**Outstanding Stunt Performance**: **The Mandalorian: "Chapter 16: The Rescue" – Lateef Crowder (Disney+)**‡; Cobra Kai: "December 19" – Jahnel Curfman, Julia Maggio, John Cihangir, and Marc Canonizado (Netflix); The Falcon and the Winter Soldier: "Truth" – John Nania, Aaron Toney, and Justin Eaton (Disney+); Gangs of London: "Episode 2" – Mens-Sana Tamakloe (AMC+); Lovecraft Country: "I Am." – Janeshia Adams-Ginyard (HBO)

=== Technical Direction ===
Technical Direction
**Outstanding Technical Direction, Camerawork, Video Control for a Series (Area)**: **Last Week Tonight with John Oliver: "Trump & Election Results / Fuck 2020" – Russell Swanson, John Schwartz, Scott Buckler, Michael Carmine, Matthew Fleischmann, Jon Graham, Dexter Kennedy, Maxwell Tubman, Michael Isler, and Grgo Ševo (HBO)**‡; America's Got Talent: "Episode 1523" – Allan Wells, Iqbal Hans, Brian Reason, Ron Lehman, David Eastwood, Adam Margolis, Dave Levisohn, John Gardner, Rob Palmer, Kary D'Alessandro, Helena Jackson, Hector Ramirez, Dan Webb, Easter Xua, and Chuck Reilly (NBC); Jimmy Kimmel Live!: "Jimmy Kimmel Live – Sacha Baron Cohen, Wesley Snipes, and Music from Charlotte Lawrence" – Ervin D. Hurd Jr., Garrett Hurt, Greg Grouwinkel, Steve Garrett, Bernd Reinhardt, Kris Wilson, and Guy Jones (ABC); Saturday Night Live: "Host: Dan Levy" – Steven Cimino, John Pinto, Paul Cangialosi, Joe DeBonis, Dave Driscoll, Eric A. Eisenstein, Franco Coello, Frank Grisanti, and Roberto Lopez (NBC); The Voice: "Live Finale (Part 2)" – Allan Wells, Mano Bonilla III, Martin J. Brown Jr., Robert Burnette, Suzanne Ebner, Guido Frenzel, Alex Hernandez, Marc Hunter, Scott Hylton, Kathrine Iacofano, Scott Kaye, Steve Martyniuk, David Plakos, Ray Reynolds, Jofre Rosero, Steve Simmons, and Terrance Ho (NBC)	**Outstanding Technical Direction, Camerawork, Video Control for a Special**: **Hamilton – Patrick Capone, Jack Donnelly, Dave Knox, Bruce MacCallum, Bill Winters, Maceo Bishop, Abby Levine, and Joe Belack (Disney+)**‡; David Byrne's American Utopia – Ellen Kuras, Gregor Tavenner, Peter Agliata, Charles Libin, Declan Quinn, Sam Levy, David Waterston, Tim Ives, Kerwin DeVonish, and Yousheng Tang (HBO); The 63rd Annual Grammy Awards – Rod Wardell, Eric Becker, Iqbal Hans, David Eastwood, Sean Flannery, Marc Hunter, Tore Livia, Allen Merriweather, David Plakos, Jofre Rosero, Keyan Safyari, Dylan Sanford, Guy Jones, and Terrance Ho (CBS); The Oscars – Eric Becker, Iqbal Hans, John Pritchett, Kenneth Shapiro, Devin Atwood, Danny Bonilla, Mano Bonilla, David Carline, Keith Dicker, David Eastwood, Suzanne Ebner, Freddy Fredericks, Garrett Hurt, Tore Livia, Steve Martyniuk, Allen Merriweather, Rob Palmer, David Plakos, George Prince, Dan Webb, Easter Xua, Brad Zerbst, Guy Jones, Kevin Faust, Terrance Ho, and John Palacio Jr. (ABC); The Pepsi Super Bowl LV Halftime Show Starring The Weeknd – Rod Wardell, Eric Becker, Robert Del Russo, Kevin French, Shaun Harkins, Jay Kulick, Jeff Latonero, Tore Livia, Allen Merriweather, Jofre Rosero, Mike Harvath, David Geller, Don Miller, Keith Rees, Timmy Mueller, Jeff Gentile, Jon Mantak, Carmen Long, Frank Lombardo, Steve Webster, Stephen Wharton, Ed Martino, Rian Weigart, JD Curl, Christian Pantuosco, Andrew Lawing, Joe Ward, John "JM" Hurley, Ian Fleisher, and Emelie Scaminaci (CBS)

=== Writing ===
Writing
**Outstanding Writing for a Variety Special**: **Bo Burnham: Inside – Bo Burnham (Netflix)**‡; The Daily Show with Trevor Noah Presents: Jordan Klepper Fingers the Pulse – Into the MAGAverse – Jordan Klepper, Ian Berger, Devin Delliquanti, and Zhubin Parang (Comedy Central); 8:46 – Dave Chappelle – Dave Chappelle (Netflix); John Lewis: Celebrating a Hero – Mitchell Marchand (CBS); Stephen Colbert's Election Night 2020: Democracy's Last Stand Building Back America Great Again Better 2020 – Ariel Dumas, Jay Katsir, Stephen Colbert, Delmonte Bent, Michael Brumm, River Clegg, Aaron Cohen, Nicole Conlan, Paul Dinello, Glenn Eichler, Django Gold, Gabe Gronli, Barry Julien, Michael Cruz Kayne, Eliana Kwartier, Matt Lappin, Felipe Torres Medina, Opus Moreschi, Asher Perlman, Tom Purcell, Kate Sidley, Brian Stack, John Thibodeaux, and Steve Waltien (Showtime)	**Outstanding Writing for a Nonfiction Program**: **The Social Dilemma – Vickie Curtis, Davis Coombe, and Jeff Orlowski (Netflix)**‡; All In: The Fight for Democracy – Jack Youngelson (Prime Video); Allen v. Farrow: "Episode 3" – Kirby Dick, Amy Ziering, Mikaela Shwer, and Parker Laramie (HBO); The Bee Gees: How Can You Mend a Broken Heart – Mark Monroe (HBO); Tulsa Burning: The 1921 Race Massacre – Maia Harris and Marco Williams (History)

=== Nominations and wins by program ===
For the purposes of the lists below, any wins in juried categories are assumed to have a prior nomination.

Shows with multiple Creative Arts nominations
Nominations	Show	Network
19	The Mandalorian	Disney+
15	WandaVision	Disney+
14	Saturday Night Live	NBC
13	The Crown	Netflix
12	Lovecraft Country	HBO
12	The Queen's Gambit	Netflix
10	The Handmaid's Tale	Hulu
9	Bridgerton	Netflix
9	Hacks	HBO Max
9	Mare of Easttown	HBO
8	RuPaul's Drag Race	VH1
7	Allen v. Farrow	HBO
7	The Social Dilemma	Netflix
7	Ted Lasso	Apple TV+
6	The Bee Gees: How Can You Mend a Broken Heart	HBO
6	Love, Death & Robots	Netflix
6	Queer Eye	Netflix
6	The Voice	NBC
5	Bo Burnham: Inside	Netflix
5	Dancing with the Stars	ABC
5	David Attenborough: A Life on Our Planet	Netflix
5	David Byrne's American Utopia	HBO
5	The Falcon and the Winter Soldier	Disney+
5	Last Week Tonight with John Oliver	HBO
5	The Underground Railroad	Prime Video
5	Zoey's Extraordinary Playlist	NBC
4	Billie Eilish: The World's a Little Blurry	Apple TV+
4	The Flight Attendant	HBO Max
4	Halston	Netflix
4	Pose	FX
4	Ratched	Netflix
4	Star Trek: Discovery	Paramount+
4	Top Chef	Bravo
4	The Umbrella Academy	Netflix
3	The Amazing Race	CBS
3	A Black Lady Sketch Show	HBO
3	The Boys	Prime Video
3	Cobra Kai	Netflix
3	Dick Johnson Is Dead	Netflix
3	Die Hart	Quibi
3	Euphoria	HBO
3	Fargo	FX
3	Friends: The Reunion	HBO Max
3	Hamilton	Disney+
3	I May Destroy You	HBO
3	The Kominsky Method	Netflix
3	The Late Show with Stephen Colbert	CBS
3	Life Below Zero	National Geographic
3	Mapleworth Murders	Quibi
3	The Masked Singer	Fox
3	The Oscars	ABC
3	The Politician	Netflix
3	Secrets of the Whales	Disney+
3	Shark Tank	ABC
3	The 63rd Annual Grammy Awards	CBS
3	This Is Us	NBC
3	Tina	HBO
3	Tulsa Burning: The 1921 Race Massacre	History
2	America's Got Talent	NBC
2	American Masters	PBS
2	Below Deck	Bravo
2	Big Mouth	Netflix
2	Black-ish	ABC
2	Boys State	Apple TV+
2	Central Park	Apple TV+
2	City So Real	National Geographic
2	The Conners	ABC
2	Deadliest Catch	Discovery Channel
2	Dolly Parton's Christmas on the Square	Netflix
2	8:46 – Dave Chappelle	Netflix
2	Framing Britney Spears (The New York Times Presents)	FX
2	Genius: Aretha	National Geographic
2	Genndy Tartakovsky's Primal	Adult Swim
2	Legendary	HBO Max
2	Mythic Quest	Apple TV+
2	Oslo	HBO
2	The Pepsi Super Bowl LV Halftime Show Starring The Weeknd	CBS
2	Perry Mason	HBO
2	Reno 911!	Quibi
2	RuPaul's Drag Race: Untucked	VH1
2	The Simpsons	Fox
2	Stanley Tucci: Searching for Italy	CNN
2	Stephen Colbert's Election Night 2020: Democracy's Last Stand Building Back America Great Again Better 2020	Showtime

Shows with multiple Creative Arts wins
Wins	Show	Network
9	The Queen's Gambit	Netflix
7	The Mandalorian	Disney+
7	Saturday Night Live	NBC
6	Love, Death & Robots	Netflix
4	The Crown	Netflix
4	RuPaul's Drag Race	VH1
3	Bo Burnham: Inside	Netflix
3	David Attenborough: A Life on Our Planet	Netflix
3	Pose	FX
3	Ted Lasso	Apple TV+
3	WandaVision	Disney+
2	David Byrne's American Utopia	HBO
2	Dolly Parton's Christmas on the Square	Netflix
2	Genndy Tartakovsky's Primal	Adult Swim
2	Life Below Zero	National Geographic
2	Lovecraft Country	HBO
2	The Social Dilemma	Netflix

=== Nominations and wins by network ===
Networks with multiple Creative Arts nominations
Nominations	Network
104	Netflix
89	HBO/HBO Max (Note: Parent company WarnerMedia combined HBO and HBO Max as a single platform for the purposes of counting nominations.)
50	Disney+
34	NBC
23	Apple TV+
18	ABC
18	CBS
15	Prime Video
11	FX
11	Hulu
10	VH1
9	Fox
9	National Geographic
8	Quibi
7	Bravo
6	Paramount+
5	YouTube
4	CNN
4	Showtime
3	Adult Swim
3	Discovery Channel
3	History
3	PBS
2	Comedy Central
2	Oculus

Networks with multiple Creative Arts wins
Wins	Network
34	Netflix
13	Disney+
10	HBO/HBO Max
7	NBC
6	Apple TV+
5	VH1
3	ABC
3	FX
2	Adult Swim
2	CNN
2	Fox
2	National Geographic

== Ceremony order and presenters ==
The following categories were presented at each ceremony:

Saturday, September 11 – 5:00 PM PT
Category	Presenter
Outstanding Main Title Design	Alex Borstein
Outstanding Contemporary Hairstyling	Paris Jackson
Outstanding Period and/or Character Hairstyling	Paris Jackson
Outstanding Contemporary Hairstyling for a Variety, Nonfiction or Reality Program	Paris Jackson
Outstanding Interactive Program	Carl Clemons-Hopkins
Outstanding Motion Design	Carl Clemons-Hopkins
Outstanding Innovation in Interactive Programming	Carl Clemons-Hopkins
Outstanding Period and/or Character Makeup (Non-Prosthetic)	Roselyn Sánchez
Outstanding Contemporary Makeup (Non-Prosthetic)	Roselyn Sánchez
Outstanding Contemporary Makeup for a Variety, Nonfiction or Reality Program (Non-Prosthetic)	Roselyn Sánchez
Outstanding Prosthetic Makeup	Maz Jobrani
Outstanding Production Design for a Variety, Reality or Competition Series	Maz Jobrani
Outstanding Production Design for a Variety Special	Maz Jobrani
Outstanding Production Design for a Narrative Contemporary Program (One Hour or More)	Thomas Lennon
Outstanding Production Design for a Narrative Period or Fantasy Program (One Hour or More)	Thomas Lennon
Outstanding Production Design for a Narrative Program (Half-Hour)	Thomas Lennon
Outstanding Cinematography for a Limited or Anthology Series or Movie	Angelica Ross
Outstanding Cinematography for a Single-Camera Series (One Hour)	Angelica Ross
Outstanding Cinematography for a Multi-Camera Series	Angelica Ross
In Memoriam segment	Thuso Mbedu
Outstanding Period Costumes	Lisa Edelstein
Outstanding Contemporary Costumes	Lisa Edelstein
Outstanding Costumes for Variety, Nonfiction, or Reality Programming	Not applicable
Outstanding Sound Mixing for a Variety Series or Special	Ming-Na Wen
Outstanding Sound Mixing for a Comedy or Drama Series (Half-Hour) and Animation	Ming-Na Wen
Outstanding Cinematography for a Single-Camera Series (Half-Hour)	Ming-Na Wen
Outstanding Single-Camera Picture Editing for a Limited or Anthology Series or Movie	Brendan Hunt
Outstanding Single-Camera Picture Editing for a Comedy Series	Brendan Hunt
Outstanding Single-Camera Picture Editing for a Drama Series	Brendan Hunt
Outstanding Multi-Camera Picture Editing for a Comedy Series	Laz Alonso
Outstanding Sound Mixing for a Limited or Anthology Series or Movie	Laz Alonso
Outstanding Sound Mixing for a Comedy or Drama Series (One Hour)	Laz Alonso
Outstanding Sound Editing for a Comedy or Drama Series (Half-Hour) and Animation	June Diane Raphael; Paul Scheer
Outstanding Sound Editing for a Limited or Anthology Series, Movie or Special	June Diane Raphael; Paul Scheer
Outstanding Sound Editing for a Comedy or Drama Series (One Hour)	June Diane Raphael; Paul Scheer
Outstanding Picture Editing for Variety Programming	Marlee Matlin
Outstanding Fantasy/Sci-Fi Costumes	Marlee Matlin

Sunday, September 12 – 1:00 PM PT
Category	Presenter
Outstanding Character Voice-Over Performance	RuPaul
Outstanding Casting for a Reality Program	Jana Schmieding
Outstanding Writing for a Nonfiction Program	Jana Schmieding
Outstanding Narrator	Jana Schmieding
Outstanding Animated Program	Randy and Jason Sklar
Outstanding Picture Editing for a Nonfiction Program	Randy and Jason Sklar
Outstanding Sound Mixing for a Nonfiction or Reality Program (Single or Multi-Camera)	Randy and Jason Sklar
Outstanding Hosted Nonfiction Series or Special	Bear Grylls
Outstanding Directing for a Documentary/Nonfiction Program	Bear Grylls
Outstanding Directing for a Reality Program	Bear Grylls
Outstanding Music Composition for a Documentary Series or Special (Original Dramatic Score)	Tituss Burgess
Outstanding Cinematography for a Nonfiction Program	Tituss Burgess
Outstanding Cinematography for a Reality Program	Tituss Burgess
Outstanding Host for a Reality or Competition Program	Ross Mathews; Michelle Visage
Outstanding Short Form Animated Program	Ross Mathews; Michelle Visage
Outstanding Individual Achievement in Animation	Ross Mathews; Michelle Visage
In Memoriam segment	Not applicable
Outstanding Sound Editing for a Nonfiction or Reality Program (Single or Multi-Camera)	Chrishell Stause
Outstanding Picture Editing for a Structured Reality or Competition Program	Chrishell Stause
Outstanding Picture Editing for an Unstructured Reality Program	Chrishell Stause
Outstanding Documentary or Nonfiction Special	Drew and Jonathan Scott
Outstanding Documentary or Nonfiction Series	Drew and Jonathan Scott
Exceptional Merit in Documentary Filmmaking	Drew and Jonathan Scott
Outstanding Structured Reality Program	W. Kamau Bell
Outstanding Short Form Nonfiction or Reality Series	W. Kamau Bell
Outstanding Unstructured Reality Program	W. Kamau Bell

Sunday, September 12 – 5:00 PM PT
Category	Presenter
Outstanding Television Movie	J. B. Smoove
Outstanding Guest Actor in a Drama Series	Yvette Nicole Brown
Outstanding Music Composition for a Series (Original Dramatic Score)	Yvette Nicole Brown
Outstanding Music Composition for a Limited or Anthology Series, Movie or Special (Original Dramatic Score)	Yvette Nicole Brown
Outstanding Guest Actress in a Drama Series	Tony Goldwyn; Daniel Dae Kim
Outstanding Music Supervision	Tony Goldwyn; Daniel Dae Kim
Outstanding Music Direction	Tony Goldwyn; Daniel Dae Kim
Outstanding Original Music and Lyrics	Manny Jacinto
Outstanding Technical Direction, Camerawork, Video Control for a Series	Manny Jacinto
Outstanding Technical Direction, Camerawork, Video Control for a Special	Manny Jacinto
Outstanding Stunt Performance	Matt Long
Outstanding Stunt Coordination	Matt Long
Outstanding Special Visual Effects in a Single Episode	Matt Long
Outstanding Directing for a Variety Special	Debbie Allen
Outstanding Directing for a Variety Series	Debbie Allen
Outstanding Commercial	Debbie Allen
In Memoriam segment	Not applicable
Outstanding Original Main Title Theme Music	Jamie Chung
Outstanding Casting for a Limited or Anthology Series or Movie	Jamie Chung
Outstanding Casting for a Drama Series	Jamie Chung
Outstanding Choreography for Variety or Reality Programming	Dulé Hill
Outstanding Choreography for Scripted Programming	Dulé Hill
Outstanding Special Visual Effects in a Season or a Movie	Dulé Hill
Outstanding Short Form Comedy, Drama or Variety Series	Bernadette Peters
Outstanding Actor in a Short Form Comedy or Drama Series	Bernadette Peters
Outstanding Actress in a Short Form Comedy or Drama Series	Bernadette Peters
Outstanding Lighting Design / Lighting Direction for a Variety Special	Mckenna Grace
Outstanding Lighting Design / Lighting Direction for a Variety Series	Mckenna Grace
Outstanding Writing for a Variety Special	Mckenna Grace
Outstanding Guest Actress in a Comedy Series	Nicole Byer
Outstanding Guest Actor in a Comedy Series	Nicole Byer
Outstanding Casting for a Comedy Series	Nicole Byer

== Ceremony information ==
The nominations for the 73rd Primetime Creative Arts Emmy Awards were announced on July 13, 2021, by Ron and Jasmine Cephas Jones via a virtual event. On July 21, the Academy of Television Arts & Sciences, also known as the Television Academy, revealed that the Creative Arts Emmys would be presented in two ceremonies on September 11, and September 12, 2021; the previous year's ceremonies were presented over five days due to the COVID-19 pandemic. The two ceremonies were scheduled to be held at the Microsoft Theater. On July 30, the event was split into three ceremonies with one ceremony held on the evening of September 11, and two ceremonies held on September 12 in the afternoon and evening. The combined ceremonies aired in an edited two-hour broadcast on September 18 on FXX.

On August 10, the ceremonies were moved to the indoor-outdoor Event Deck at L.A. Live due to then-ongoing COVID-19 concerns. Additionally, the Television Academy announced that nominated teams would be limited to four tickets per nomination. Despite the changes, producer Bob Bain sought to create an event that closely resembled pre-pandemic ceremonies "in terms of energy" while still making changes as needed. Unlike previous ceremonies, audiences were seated at tables, similar to the Golden Globe Awards or Critics' Choice Awards, while the shift from the traditional two ceremonies to three allowed the event to have better pacing, according to Bain. The event did not have a host; instead, each ceremony relied on numerous presenters throughout the ceremonies with a "show opener" at the beginning. To minimize COVID-19 risks, winners received their trophies on a separate stage from the presenters, and microphones were cleaned between speeches. Attendees were also required to show proof of vaccination and a negative COVID-19 test before the event.

=== Category and rule changes ===
Several changes that were implemented for these ceremonies include:

- Outstanding Short Form Comedy or Drama Series and Outstanding Short Form Variety Series were merged to form Outstanding Short Form Comedy, Drama or Variety Series.
- Outstanding Derivative Interactive Program, Outstanding Original Interactive Program, and Outstanding Interactive Extension of a Linear Program were merged to form Outstanding Interactive Program.
- Outstanding Stunt Coordination for a Comedy Series or Variety Program and Outstanding Stunt Coordination for a Drama Series, Limited Series, or Movie were merged to form Outstanding Stunt Coordination, and a new category for Outstanding Stunt Performance was created.
- Outstanding Special Visual Effects and Outstanding Special Visual Effects in a Supporting Role were reorganized to form Outstanding Special Visual Effects in a Season or a Movie and Outstanding Special Visual Effects in a Single Episode.
- Outstanding Costumes for Variety, Nonfiction or Reality Programming became a juried award.
- Outstanding Period and/or Character Hairstyling and Outstanding Period and/or Character Makeup (Non-Prosthetic) became area awards.
- Outstanding Choreography for Scripted Programming was modified to allow nominations.
- Anthology series became eligible in the limited series categories, which were renamed accordingly.
- Any programs that were nominated for Academy Awards, as well as any non-documentary programs that were placed on the Academy of Motion Picture Arts and Sciences viewing platform, were no longer eligible for Emmys.
- All children's programming were moved to the Daytime Emmy Awards, run by the National Academy of Television Arts & Sciences.

In addition, the awards for Outstanding Writing for a Variety Series and Outstanding Variety Special (Pre-Recorded) were moved to the main ceremony in July, followed by the awards for Outstanding Variety Sketch Series and Outstanding Variety Special (Live) in August.
