= The Crown season 4 =

Season of television series

The Crown
- Season 4
- Promotional poster
- Starring: Olivia Colman; Tobias Menzies; Helena Bonham Carter; Gillian Anderson; Josh O'Connor; Emma Corrin; Marion Bailey; Erin Doherty; Stephen Boxer; Emerald Fennell
- No. of episodes: 10

Release
- Original network: Netflix
- Original release: 15 November 2020

Season chronology
- ← Previous; Season 3 Next → Season 5

The fourth season of The Crown, which follows the life and reign of Queen Elizabeth II, was released by Netflix on 15 November 2020.

Olivia Colman stars as Elizabeth, with main cast members Tobias Menzies, Helena Bonham Carter, Josh O'Connor, Marion Bailey, Erin Doherty and Emerald Fennell all reprising their roles from the third season. Gillian Anderson, Emma Corrin and Stephen Boxer are added to the main cast. Additionally, Charles Dance returns in the season's first episode and Claire Foy reprises her role as Elizabeth in a cameo flashback scene.

Season 4 of The Crown received critical praise for the performances of its cast members. It was also the most-awarded season, making history as the first drama series to sweep all major categories at the 73rd Primetime Emmy Awards, with a leading eleven total wins (including seven major wins) from a leading twenty-four total nominations (including eleven major nominations). The season became the only one to win the Primetime Emmy Award for Outstanding Drama Series.

== Premise ==
The Crown traces the life of Queen Elizabeth II from her wedding in 1947 to the present day.

Season 4 spans 1979–1990, during Margaret Thatcher's 11-year premiership. Events depicted include the courtship and wedding of Prince Charles and Lady Diana Spencer, their 1983 tour of Australia and New Zealand, the Falklands War, Michael Fagan's break-in at Buckingham Palace, the assassination and funeral of Lord Mountbatten, the Princess of Wales's appearance at the Barnardo's Champion Children Awards, and at the end of the series, Thatcher's departure from office, as well as the marital difficulties of Charles and Diana.

== Cast ==
=== Main ===
- Olivia Colman as Queen Elizabeth II
- Tobias Menzies as Prince Philip, Duke of Edinburgh, Elizabeth's husband
- Helena Bonham Carter as Princess Margaret, Elizabeth's younger sister
- Gillian Anderson as Margaret Thatcher, Prime Minister of the United Kingdom
- Josh O'Connor as Prince Charles, Elizabeth and Philip's eldest child and the heir apparent
- Emma Corrin as Lady Diana Spencer, Charles's fiancée; later the Princess of Wales as his wife
- Marion Bailey as Queen Elizabeth the Queen Mother, Elizabeth II's mother
- Erin Doherty as Princess Anne, Elizabeth and Philip's second child and only daughter
- Stephen Boxer as Denis Thatcher, Margaret Thatcher's husband
- Emerald Fennell as Camilla Parker Bowles, Charles's long-time lover

==== Featured ====
The following actors are credited in the opening titles of single episodes in which they play a significant role:

- Charles Dance as Lord Mountbatten, Philip's uncle and a father figure to Charles
- Tom Brooke as Michael Fagan, a man who entered Elizabeth's bedroom in Buckingham Palace in 1982
- Richard Roxburgh as Bob Hawke, the Prime Minister of Australia
- Tom Burke as Dazzle Jennings, a friend and confidant of Princess Margaret
- Nicholas Farrell as Michael Shea, the Queen's press secretary
- Claire Foy as young Princess Elizabeth, in 1947

=== Recurring ===
- Angus Imrie as Prince Edward, Elizabeth and Philip's youngest child
- Tom Byrne as Prince Andrew, Elizabeth and Philip's third child
- Freddie Fox as Mark Thatcher, son of Margaret Thatcher
- Rebecca Humphries as Carol Thatcher, daughter of Margaret Thatcher
- Charles Edwards as Lord Charteris of Amisfield, Private Secretary to the Queen
- Richard Goulding as Edward Adeane, Private Secretary to the Prince of Wales, and son of former private secretary to the Queen Lord Adeane
- Penny Downie as Princess Alice, Duchess of Gloucester, Elizabeth's paternal aunt by marriage and widow of Prince Henry, Duke of Gloucester
- Sam Phillips as the Queen's equerry
- Letty Thomas as Virginia Pitman, one of Diana's flatmates
- Allegra Marland as Carolyn Pride, one of Diana's flatmates
- Flora Higgins as Anne Bolton, one of Diana's flatmates
- Geoffrey Breton as Mark Phillips, Princess Anne's husband
- Kevin McNally as Bernard Ingham, Downing Street Press Secretary
- Paul Jesson as Sir Geoffrey Howe, Chancellor of the Exchequer; later Foreign Secretary, Leader of the House of Commons and Deputy Prime Minister of the United Kingdom
- Nicholas Day as Jim Prior, Secretary of State for Employment
- Richard Syms as Lord Hailsham, Lord High Chancellor of Great Britain
- Peter Pacey as Lord Soames, Leader of the House of Lords (and Sir Winston Churchill's son-in-law)
- Paul Bigley as John Nott, Secretary of State for Business, Energy and Industrial Strategy
- Don Gallagher as Willie Whitelaw, Deputy Prime Minister of the United Kingdom
- Guy Siner as Francis Pym, Secretary of State for Defence
- Georgie Glen as Ruth Roche, Baroness Fermoy, the Queen Mother's lady-in-waiting and Diana's maternal grandmother
- Dugald Bruce Lockhart as John Moore, Secretary of State for Work and Pensions
- Judith Paris as Wendy Mitchell, Lady Diana's dance teacher
- Dominic Rowan as Charles Powell, Private Secretary for Foreign Affairs to the Prime Minister
- Andrew Buchan as Andrew Parker Bowles, Camilla's husband
- Tony Jayawardena as Sir Shridath Ramphal, Commonwealth Secretary-General
- Alana Ramsey as Sarah Lindsay, a Buckingham Palace press officer and wife of Major Hugh Lindsay
- Jessica Aquilina as Sarah Ferguson, fiancée and later wife of Andrew
- Tom Turner as Patrick Jephson, Diana's private secretary
- David Phelan as Dickie Arbiter, Press Secretary to the Queen
- Lucas Barber-Grant as Prince William of Wales, Charles and Diana's elder son
- Arran Tinker as Prince Harry of Wales, Charles and Diana's younger son
- Daniel Fraser as the Queen's equerry

=== Notable guests ===
- Isobel Eadie as Lady Sarah Spencer / Lady Sarah McCorquodale, Lady Diana's elder sister
- Harriet Benson as Lady Brabourne, daughter of Lord Mountbatten
- Valerie Sarruf as The Dowager Lady Brabourne, Lord Brabourne's mother
- Brandon Whitt as Timothy Knatchbull, Lord Mountbatten's grandson
- Evan Whitt as Nicholas Knatchbull, Lord Mountbatten's grandson
- Mark Carlisle as Lord Brabourne, Lord Mountbatten's son-in-law
- Patrick McBrearty as Francis McGirl, Member of the Provisional Irish Republican Army who murdered Lord Mountbatten
- Mark Brennan as Thomas McMahon, Member of the Provisional Irish Republican Army who murdered Lord Mountbatten
- Roy Sampson as Laurens van der Post, close friend of Prince Charles
- Billy Mack as Ghillie
- Karina Orr as Anne-Charlotte Verney, French rally driver
- Pierre Philippe as Jean Garnier
- Oscar Foronda as Constantino Davidoff, Argentine businessman
- Douglas Reith as Admiral Henry Leach, First Sea Lord and Chief of the Naval Staff
- Leanne Everitt as Christine Fagan, Michael Fagan's wife
- Elliott Hughes and Jasper Hughes as the infant Prince William of Wales
- Adam Fitzgerald as Graham Evans
- Naomi Allisstone as Hazel Hawke, Prime Minister Bob Hawke's wife
- Harry Treadaway as Roddy Llewellyn, Princess Margaret's former lover
- Nancy Carroll as Lady Glenconner, Princess Margaret's lady-in-waiting
- Richard Teverson as Lord Glenconner, husband of Lady Glenconner
- Gemma Jones as Penelope Carter, Princess Margaret's therapist
- Trudie Emery as Katherine Bowes-Lyon, Elizabeth and Margaret's first cousin, niece of Queen Elizabeth the Queen Mother
- Pauline Hendrickson as Nerissa Bowes-Lyon, Elizabeth and Margaret's first cousin, niece of Queen Elizabeth the Queen Mother
- Eva Feiler as young Margaret Thatcher
- Tom Espiner as Simon Freeman, a Sunday Times reporter
- Peter Symonds as Hardy Amies, Royal Warrant holder as designer to the Queen
- Jay Webb as Wayne Sleep, Dancer who performed Uptown Girl at Prince Charles 37th birthday
- Daniel Donskoy as James Hewitt, Princess Diana's lover
- Lin Sagovsky as Elspeth Howe, Geoffrey Howe's wife, who is Camilla's aunt
- Annette Badland as Dr Margaret Heagarty, director of paediatrics at Harlem Hospital
- Nadia Williams as Veronica Middleton-Jeter, a social worker at Henry Street Settlement
- Ailema Sousa as Linda Correa, a homeless mother of three
- Nick Wymer as Kenneth Clarke, Secretary of State for Health; later Secretary of State for Education
- Al Barclay as Michael Howard, Secretary of State for Employment
- Keith Chopping as Norman Lamont, Chief Secretary to the Treasury
- Martin Fisher as Peter Lilley, Secretary of State for Business, Energy and Industrial Strategy
- Marc Ozall as John Major, Foreign Secretary; later Chancellor of the Exchequer and Prime Minister of the United Kingdom
- Duncan Duff as Cecil Parkinson, Secretary of State for Transport
- Oliver Milburn as Chris Patten, Secretary of State for the Environment; later Chairman of the Conservative Party
- Michael Mears as Malcolm Rifkind, Secretary of State for Scotland
- Stephen Greif as Bernard Weatherill, Speaker of the House of Commons

== Episodes ==
No. overall	No. in season	Title	Directed by	Written by	Original release date
31	1	"Gold Stick"	Benjamin Caron	Peter Morgan	15 November 2020
Charles meets Lady Diana Spencer while picking up her elder sister Sarah for a date. The Conservative Party wins the general election and Margaret Thatcher becomes the country's first female prime minister. Elizabeth is surprised when Thatcher expresses contempt for their gender during their first audience. In Iceland, Charles, who is on holiday with friends, receives a phone call from Mountbatten, who criticises his ongoing affair with Camilla. The royal family later learns Mountbatten and three other people were killed by a bomb planted in his fishing boat. The Provisional IRA takes responsibility for the attack, and Thatcher vows to defeat them. Charles receives a letter Mountbatten wrote the day he died, urging him to find a suitable wife. After seeing Diana again at a showjumping event, Charles asks Sarah's permission to start dating her.
32	2	"The Balmoral Test"	Paul Whittington	Peter Morgan	15 November 2020
Thatcher pushes through significant spending cuts in her first budget, against opposition from some colleagues. The Thatchers spend a weekend with the royal family at Balmoral, having been warned about "the Balmoral test". The Thatchers do not get along with their hosts, and leave early using the excuse of state business. Charles continues to confide in Camilla; she encourages him to pursue Diana. Diana is invited to Balmoral. She passes ‘the test’ and impresses them by spotting a stag for shooting. The family pushes Charles to think about marrying her, despite his reservations. Thatcher reshuffles her Cabinet to dismiss her opponents.
33	3	"Fairytale"	Benjamin Caron	Peter Morgan	15 November 2020
Charles proposes to Diana, and she accepts. Diana moves from her London flatshare into the palace, amid a media frenzy. She is tutored in the ways of the palace by her grandmother, who is formal and unsympathetic. Diana begins to have episodes of an eating disorder due to the stresses she is now feeling. While Charles is abroad, she meets Camilla for lunch and realises that she hardly knows Charles at all, while Camilla knows every detail about him. Distressed, she thinks of calling the marriage off. Meanwhile, Charles returns from his trip and sees Camilla before returning home; he tells Diana he had visited her to end their relationship. Margaret tells the Queen and Philip that Charles still loves Camilla and that the marriage will be a mistake, but Philip says that Charles will grow to love Diana. The Queen tells Charles to focus on his duty, and happiness will follow. The marriage goes ahead amid huge public celebrations.
34	4	"Favourites"	Paul Whittington	Peter Morgan	15 November 2020
Thatcher breaks down during an audience with Elizabeth, confessing that her son Mark has gone missing while competing in the Paris–Dakar Rally. Philip and Elizabeth discuss favourite children; Philip says he favours Anne, but won't say who he thinks is hers. Elizabeth has her secretary arrange for her to meet each of her children separately, and to give her details of their likes and dislikes so that she should not appear remote to them. Each of her children expresses dissatisfaction with their lives and reveals information Elizabeth did not know. Argentina invades the Falkland Islands, and Thatcher demands action to recover them. Mark Thatcher is found in Algeria. Diana is pregnant, while her relationship with Charles appears to have deteriorated. He tells Elizabeth that he is still in regular contact with Camilla. Elizabeth shares her concern about their children's lives with Philip.
35	5	"Fagan"	Paul Whittington	Jonathan Wilson and Peter Morgan	15 November 2020
Thatcher tells the Queen about the recapture of the Falklands. Meanwhile, unemployment is rising, and Michael Fagan goes to see his MP to complain about the economy and the money spent on the war. The MP sarcastically suggests he should raise his concerns with the Queen. Fagan's life contrasts with that of the Queen - his cramped rundown squalor of a high-rise council estate, and the spacious luxury and wealth of the Palace. One evening, Fagan climbs over the palace railings. Inside, he is spotted but makes his escape. After being denied contact with his children by social services, he returns and breaks into the palace again, finding the Queen in her bedroom. Fagan talks with the Queen and asks her to save the country from the PM. After Thatcher and the Queen discuss their different social outlooks, the PM leaves to attend the Falklands victory parade.
36	6	"Terra Nullius"	Julian Jarrold	Peter Morgan	15 November 2020
Republican Bob Hawke becomes Australian prime minister, raising the stakes for Charles and Diana's impending royal visit. He hopes the high cost of the visit will provide the tipping point to public backing of a republic. Diana insists on taking baby Prince William, to the Queen's disapproval. Charles and Diana discuss the difficulties of their marriage; Diana complains about his continuing interest in Camilla; they agree to try harder and, after a shaky start, the visit turns into a success with huge crowds turning out to see the young Princess, and their relationship temporarily improves. The Queen rewatches film footage of her own and Philip's tour of Australia in 1954 and becomes unsettled at the thought that this new royal tour is proving more successful. At an official reception, Hawke tells Charles that Diana has saved the monarchy in Australia. Charles and Diana argue again, and her eating disorder worsens. Back in the UK, they return to separate homes. Diana sees the Queen and tells of their unhappy marriage, but Elizabeth is unsympathetic and, when Diana hugs her, she walks out.
37	7	"The Hereditary Principle"	Jessica Hobbs	Peter Morgan	15 November 2020
With Edward coming of age, Margaret finds her public role reduced and she falls into depression. She travels abroad to recuperate from having part of her left lung removed, and starts seeing a therapist on Charles's advice. After the therapist inadvertently mentions her deceased maternal first cousins Nerissa and Katherine Bowes-Lyon, Margaret learns that they are still alive and, along with three other cousins, in a mental institution. She confronts the Queen Mother, who claims the family had no choice as knowledge of the cousins' existence would have called the purity of the bloodline into question. Margaret confides her insecurities about becoming mad to her therapist, who reassures her she will not. Margaret reassumes her role yet broods in private.
38	8	"48:1"	Julian Jarrold	Peter Morgan	15 November 2020
In 1947, then-Princess Elizabeth makes a radio broadcast from Cape Town, South Africa on her 21st birthday, vowing to devote her life to serving the people of the Commonwealth of Nations. In 1985, Elizabeth and Thatcher travel to Nassau, The Bahamas for the CHOGM, where the two clash over imposing economic sanctions on apartheid South Africa; Elizabeth believes sanctions are necessary to fight racial segregation while Thatcher claims sanctions would hurt Britain's trade and decimate South Africa's already weak economy. After numerous modifications, including changing the word "sanctions" to "signals", Thatcher signs the agreement to impose pressure on South Africa but then gives a press briefing undermining the agreement. Back in the UK, the press claims that the Queen is "dismayed" with the prime minister's actions. When questioned about it directly by Thatcher, the Queen insists on her apolitical position, yet tells her press secretary to remain silent about rumours of a feud between the two women. With this rift putting the Queen in a less favourable light, they decide to scapegoat press secretary Michael Shea to deflect attention away from the Queen.
39	9	"Avalanche"	Jessica Hobbs	Peter Morgan	15 November 2020
At a gala organised by the Royal Opera House in honour of Charles's birthday, Diana surprises the audience by taking the stage and performing a duet to "Uptown Girl", prompting Charles to resent her popularity. They both leave on a ski trip to Switzerland but return after surviving an avalanche that kills their friend Hugh Lindsay. When Elizabeth learns both Charles and Diana have been unfaithful, she and Philip attempt to get the couple to reconcile. At a meeting, Diana promises to remain faithful while Charles is not given a chance to speak. Anne later tells Charles he should not be delusional about his affair, and Camilla tells him they should be realistic about their relationship. As Charles keeps ignoring Diana, she resumes her affair with James Hewitt.
40	10	"War"	Jessica Hobbs	Peter Morgan	15 November 2020
Thatcher finds her leadership challenged after Deputy Prime Minister Geoffrey Howe tenders his resignation in Parliament. Determining to dissolve Parliament, she asks Elizabeth for her support but is advised to do nothing. Thatcher later steps down as Prime Minister and receives the rare honour of the Order of Merit. Charles, having learned that Diana is still seeing James Hewitt, plans to move forward with a separation while Diana, despite doubts about her capability to carry a solo trip, travels to New York on a Concorde and charms the public. Observing Diana's popularity via television, Camilla tells Charles she's afraid of being subjected to public shame if their affair is discovered. Charles then takes out his anger on Diana upon her return. When the family gathers for Christmas, Charles corners Elizabeth, who berates him for his immaturity and ingratitude about his privilege before forbidding him from going through with either separation or divorce. Philip tells Diana she is not the only one suffering, advises her to concentrate her efforts on serving Elizabeth, and warns her not to let her marriage fail.

== Production ==
=== Development ===
By October 2017, "early production" had begun on an anticipated third and fourth season, and by the following January, Netflix confirmed the series had been renewed for a third and fourth season.

=== Casting ===
The producers recast some roles with older actors every two seasons, as the characters age. In October 2017, Olivia Colman was cast as Queen Elizabeth II for the third and fourth seasons. By January 2018, Helena Bonham Carter and Paul Bettany were in negotiations to portray Princess Margaret and Prince Philip, respectively, for these seasons. However, by the end of the month Bettany was forced to drop out due to the time commitment required. By the end of March 2018, Tobias Menzies was cast as Philip for the third and fourth seasons. In early May 2018, Bonham Carter was confirmed to have been cast. The next month, Erin Doherty was cast as Princess Anne. A month later, Josh O'Connor and Marion Bailey were cast as Prince Charles and the Queen Mother, respectively, for the third and fourth seasons. In October 2018, Emerald Fennell was cast as Camilla Shand. In December 2018, Charles Dance was cast as Louis Mountbatten. In April 2019, Emma Corrin was cast as Lady Diana Spencer for the fourth season. In September 2019 Gillian Anderson, who had been rumoured since that January to be in talks to portray Margaret Thatcher in the fourth season, was officially confirmed for the role.

=== Filming ===
The fourth season began filming in August 2019 and completed in March 2020. The producers confirmed that filming was completed ahead of the COVID-19 pandemic lockdown; the release date was not delayed.

=== Music ===
The Crown: Season Four

Soundtrack album by Martin Phipps
- Released: 20 November 2020
- Genre: Soundtrack
- Length: 43:23
- Label: Sony Music

Martin Phipps soundtrack chronology
The Crown: Season Three (2019)	The Crown: Season Four (2020)	Solos (2021)

No.	Title	Length
1.	"War"	2:55
2.	"Fairytale"	4:47
3.	"The Diana Effect"	2:23
4.	"Simple Harp Variation No. 1"	2:33
5.	"Voices"	3:30
6.	"Hereditary"	1:43
7.	"The Whole of Me"	3:22
8.	"Commonwealth"	3:51
9.	"Fred & Gladys"	2:38
10.	"Daggers"	2:33
11.	"Tremulus"	2:35
12.	"Queen vs PM"	5:35
13.	"Simple Harp Variation No. 2"	2:30
14.	"Your Royal Highness"	2:22
Total length:		43:23

== Release ==
Season 4 was released on Netflix on 15 November 2020. It was later released on DVD and Blu-ray on 2 November 2021.

== Reception ==
Season 4 of The Crown received universal acclaim from critics upon release. Rotten Tomatoes reported a 96% approval rating for the season based on 113 reviews, with an average rating of 8.60/10. The critical consensus reads: "Whatever historical liberties The Crown takes are easily forgiven thanks to the sheer power of its performances—particularly Anderson's imposing take on The Iron Lady and newcomer Corrin's embodiment of a young Princess Diana." On Metacritic, the season holds a score of 86 out of 100 based on 28 critics, indicating "universal acclaim".

Writing in The Atlantic, Shirley Li describes the drama as "sharper than ever" and "splashy" but observes that, in contrast to the first three seasons, the fourth criticises the Queen for her "ignorance" and "stubborn devotion to tradition." In the Evening Standard, Katie Rosseinsky wrote that the season's episodes are "dizzyingly beautiful and staggering in scope", and highlights the outstanding performances of Anderson and Corrin as Thatcher and Lady Diana, respectively. In The New Zealand Herald, university professor Giselle Bastin described the season as "a masterly portrait of the turbulent 1980s" and complimented the production standards, casting, and acting. BBC's arts editor Will Gompertz gave the series a rating of 4 out of 5, praising Corrin and Bonham Carter, but criticising Anderson's performance for "forever craning her neck from side-to-side as if scanning for a tasty lettuce leaf, while over-egging her Thatcher impression to such an extent she is close to unwatchable at times."

In a critical review, Dominic Patten of Deadline Hollywood complimented the earlier seasons but said that the fourth had "substantially tweaked timelines" and was "sub-standard soap," and that, despite Colman's performance, some of the other characters were like "Spitting Image live-action caricature[s]." Writing in The Guardian, Simon Jenkins described the season as "fake history," "reality hijacked as propaganda, and a cowardly abuse of artistic licence" that fabricated history to suit its own preconceived narrative. The season has reportedly received backlash from the British royal family and some royal commentators. Royal historian Hugo Vickers stated: "In this particular series, every member of the royal family...comes out of it badly, except the Princess of Wales (Diana). It's totally one-sided, it's totally against Prince Charles." Royal biographer Penny Junor criticised the season as portraying the British royal family as "villains", stating that "The Crown's royals are wild, cruel distortions of the people I've known for 40 years."

== Accolades ==
Season 4 led the 73rd Primetime Emmy Awards with 24 total nominations, including 11 major nominations. The season made history as the first drama series to sweep all categories, with 11 total wins, including 7 major wins. It also became the only season of the series to win the Primetime Emmy Award for Outstanding Drama Series.

Year	Award	Category	Nominee(s)	Result	Ref.
2021	73rd Primetime Emmy Awards	Outstanding Drama Series	The Crown	Won	
2021	73rd Primetime Emmy Awards	Outstanding Lead Actor in a Drama Series	Josh O'Connor (for "Terra Nullius")	Won	
2021	73rd Primetime Emmy Awards	Outstanding Lead Actress in a Drama Series	Olivia Colman (for "48:1")	Won	
2021	73rd Primetime Emmy Awards	Outstanding Lead Actress in a Drama Series	Emma Corrin (for "Fairytale")	Nominated	
2021	73rd Primetime Emmy Awards	Outstanding Supporting Actor in a Drama Series	Tobias Menzies (for "Gold Stick")	Won	
2021	73rd Primetime Emmy Awards	Outstanding Supporting Actress in a Drama Series	Gillian Anderson (for "Favourites")	Won	
2021	73rd Primetime Emmy Awards	Outstanding Supporting Actress in a Drama Series	Helena Bonham Carter (for "The Hereditary Principle")	Nominated	
2021	73rd Primetime Emmy Awards	Outstanding Supporting Actress in a Drama Series	Emerald Fennell (for "Fairytale")	Nominated	
2021	73rd Primetime Emmy Awards	Outstanding Directing for a Drama Series	Benjamin Caron (for "Fairytale")	Nominated	
2021	73rd Primetime Emmy Awards	Outstanding Directing for a Drama Series	Jessica Hobbs (for "War")	Won	
2021	73rd Primetime Emmy Awards	Outstanding Writing for a Drama Series	Peter Morgan (for "War")	Won	
2021	73rd Primetime Creative Arts Emmy Awards	Outstanding Guest Actor in a Drama Series	Charles Dance (for "Gold Stick")	Nominated	
2021	73rd Primetime Creative Arts Emmy Awards	Outstanding Guest Actress in a Drama Series	Claire Foy (for "48:1")	Won	
2021	73rd Primetime Creative Arts Emmy Awards	Outstanding Production Design for a Narrative Period or Fantasy Program (One Hour or More)	Martin Childs, Mark Raggett, and Alison Harvey (for "War")	Nominated	
2021	73rd Primetime Creative Arts Emmy Awards	Outstanding Casting for a Drama Series	Robert Sterne	Won	
2021	73rd Primetime Creative Arts Emmy Awards	Outstanding Cinematography for a Series (One Hour)	Adriano Goldman (for "Fairytale")	Won	
2021	73rd Primetime Creative Arts Emmy Awards	Outstanding Period Costumes	Amy Roberts, Sidonie Roberts, and Giles Gale (for "Terra Nullius")	Nominated	
2021	73rd Primetime Creative Arts Emmy Awards	Outstanding Hairstyling	Cate Hall, Emilie Yong Mills, Sam Smart, Suzanne David, Debbie Ormrod, and Stacey Louise Holman (for "Terra Nullius")	Nominated	
2021	73rd Primetime Creative Arts Emmy Awards	Outstanding Music Composition for a Series (Original Dramatic Score)	Martin Phipps (for "The Balmoral Test")	Nominated	
2021	73rd Primetime Creative Arts Emmy Awards	Outstanding Music Supervision	Sarah Bridge (for "Fairytale")	Nominated	
2021	73rd Primetime Creative Arts Emmy Awards	Outstanding Picture Editing for a Drama Series	Yan Miles (for "Fairytale")	Won	
2021	73rd Primetime Creative Arts Emmy Awards	Outstanding Picture Editing for a Drama Series	Paulo Pandolpho (for "Avalanche")	Nominated	
2021	73rd Primetime Creative Arts Emmy Awards	Outstanding Sound Mixing for a Comedy or Drama Series (One-Hour)	Lee Walpole, Stuart Hilliker, Martin Jensen, and Chris Ashworth (for "Fairytale")	Nominated	
2021	73rd Primetime Creative Arts Emmy Awards	Outstanding Special Visual Effects	Ben Turner, Reece Ewing, Andrew Scrase, Standish Millennas, Oliver Bersey, Jonathan Wood, David Fleet, Joe Cork, and Garrett Honn (for "Gold Stick")	Nominated	
2021	78th Golden Globe Awards	Best Television Series – Drama	The Crown	Won	
2021	78th Golden Globe Awards	Best Actor – Television Series Drama	Josh O'Connor	Won	
2021	78th Golden Globe Awards	Best Actress – Television Series Drama	Olivia Colman	Nominated	
2021	78th Golden Globe Awards	Best Actress – Television Series Drama	Emma Corrin	Won	
2021	78th Golden Globe Awards	Best Supporting Actress – Series, Miniseries or Television Film	Gillian Anderson	Won	
2021	78th Golden Globe Awards	Best Supporting Actress – Series, Miniseries or Television Film	Helena Bonham Carter	Nominated	
2021	67th British Academy Television Awards	Best Drama Series	The Crown	Nominated	
2021	67th British Academy Television Awards	Best Actor	Josh O'Connor	Nominated	
2021	67th British Academy Television Awards	Best Supporting Actor	Tobias Menzies	Nominated	
2021	67th British Academy Television Awards	Best Supporting Actress	Helena Bonham Carter	Nominated	
2021	22nd British Academy Television Craft Awards	Best Costume Design	Amy Roberts	Nominated	
2021	22nd British Academy Television Craft Awards	Best Director: Fiction	Benjamin Caron (for "Aberfan")	Nominated	
2021	22nd British Academy Television Craft Awards	Best Make-Up & Hair Design	Cate Hall	Nominated	
2021	22nd British Academy Television Craft Awards	Best Original Music	Martin Phipps	Nominated	
2021	22nd British Academy Television Craft Awards	Best Sound: Fiction	Sound Team	Nominated	
2021	22nd British Academy Television Craft Awards	Best Special, Visual & Graphic Effects	Ben Turner, Reece Ewing, Chris Reynolds, Asa Shoul, Framestore, Untold Studios	Nominated	
2021	26th Critics' Choice Awards	Best Drama Series	The Crown	Won	
2021	26th Critics' Choice Awards	Best Actor in a Drama Series	Josh O'Connor	Won	
2021	26th Critics' Choice Awards	Best Actress in a Drama Series	Olivia Colman	Nominated	
2021	26th Critics' Choice Awards	Best Actress in a Drama Series	Emma Corrin	Won	
2021	26th Critics' Choice Awards	Best Supporting Actor in a Drama Series	Tobias Menzies	Nominated	
2021	26th Critics' Choice Awards	Best Supporting Actress in a Drama Series	Gillian Anderson	Won	
2021	27th Screen Actors Guild Awards	Outstanding Performance by an Ensemble in a Drama Series	Gillian Anderson, Marion Bailey, Helena Bonham Carter, Stephen Boxer, Olivia Colman, Emma Corrin, Erin Doherty, Charles Edwards, Emerald Fennell, Tobias Menzies, Josh O'Connor, and Sam Phillips	Won	
2021	27th Screen Actors Guild Awards	Outstanding Performance by a Male Actor in a Drama Series	Josh O'Connor	Nominated	
2021	27th Screen Actors Guild Awards	Outstanding Performance by a Female Actor in a Drama Series	Gillian Anderson	Won	
2021	27th Screen Actors Guild Awards	Outstanding Performance by a Female Actor in a Drama Series	Olivia Colman	Nominated	
2021	27th Screen Actors Guild Awards	Outstanding Performance by a Female Actor in a Drama Series	Emma Corrin	Nominated	

== Historical accuracy ==
Vickers further argued that Season 4 is "yet more subtly divisive than earlier seasons", with "pretty much every character" shown as "dislikeable", and that "every member of the royal family ... comes out of it badly, except the Princess of Wales". He also called season four the least accurate season in the series. Royal commentator Emily Andrews said that "sources close to Prince Charles" have labelled some of the scenes "trolling on a Hollywood budget". It was also reported that Prince Charles and Camilla turned off comments on their Instagram and Twitter accounts, such was the intensely negative reaction to their portrayals.

Throughout the season, the Private Secretary to the Sovereign is portrayed as Sir Martin Charteris, yet in reality, he retired in 1977.

The opening scene when Prince Charles first meets Diana is fictionalised, although they did meet during a date with her sister, Sarah. Vickers has stated that Prince Charles had no personal contact with Camilla during the first five years of his marriage; their relationship developed after 1986, by which time the marriage had broken down. The frenzy around Prince Charles and Diana's Australian tour is accurately depicted, including his feelings of being overshadowed by Diana, which have been confirmed by multiple sources. Diana's former press secretary has confirmed their fractious relationship when away from the media. Their schedule was never revised to accommodate Prince William, and the sheep station was arranged for them in advance by the former Australian Prime Minister, specifically so that the couple could be with their son each night. According to Dickie Arbiter, the meeting in which Sir John Riddell, the Prince of Wales's private secretary, questions Diana's mental fitness before her solo trip to New York never happened.

Mountbatten did not write to the Prince of Wales shortly before he died, although he had written advising him in the past. The newsreel clips of Northern Ireland shown alongside Mountbatten's assassination included events that had happened years earlier, and others that had not yet occurred.

Vickers suggested that almost all the details concerning how visitors are treated at Balmoral are inaccurate, and noted that the Thatchers' first visit is depicted out of sequence with Mountbatten's funeral. The Thatchers did not enjoy their visits to Balmoral, but there is no evidence that the Prime Minister dressed inappropriately. Diana's visit happened an entire year later, when the Queen was not present. He added that, as a member of an aristocratic family, Diana was already familiar with royal etiquette, and therefore would not have needed the intensive lessons given by Lady Fermoy that were portrayed in the show.

Charles Moore, Margaret Thatcher's biographer, deemed the scene where Thatcher begs the Queen to dissolve Parliament so she can stay on as PM "factual nonsense". It is true, however, that she used to do her own ironing at Downing Street. It is unlikely that Prince Philip ever mocked her for being a scientist, given his own interest in the sciences. Mark Thatcher going missing during the Paris–Dakar Rally did not coincide with the Falklands invasion.

Michael Fagan has said that his conversation with the Queen in the palace bedroom was "short, polite and non-controversial", and that he never spoke about Margaret Thatcher.

The scene where the Queen guesses who the Prime Minister might appoint to cabinet is entirely fictional, nor would the PM have ever left a royal audience early or criticised the Queen for her privilege. Vickers says that, in reality, it was the Queen's press secretary who took it upon himself to pass his own views about the Prime Minister to the media, and he was forced to leave the palace as a consequence.

The plot involving the family's relationship with the Bowes-Lyon sisters is largely inaccurate. Princess Margaret played no part in discovering their existence, nor did she confront her mother about this. John "Jock" Bowes-Lyon died six years before Edward VIII's abdication, and the sisters were placed in the Royal Earlswood Hospital by their mother Fenella in 1941. The Queen Mother believed her nieces to be dead until 1982 and upon discovering that they were alive, sent money for toys and sweets on their birthdays and at Christmas. According to the Bowes-Lyon family, there was never any attempt at a coverup. The relationship between Princess Margaret and Father Derek "Dazzle" Jennings is also heavily fictionalised. Jennings did not have any involvement with the Bowes-Lyon sisters and remained Princess Margaret's friend and spiritual advisor, with the Princess visiting his sickbed before he died in 1995. Similarly, Princess Margaret's interest in Catholicism is underplayed; she did not convert, but Jennings was reportedly convinced she would, even going so far as to arrange for a dinner between the Princess and Cardinal Hume in 1988.
