= Dickie Arbiter =

British journalist, television and radio commentator

Dickie Arbiter LVO
- Born: September 1940 (age 86); London, England
- Known for: Press secretary for Queen Elizabeth II (1988–2000); Media reporter for the British royal family
- Children: 1

Dickie Arbiter (born September 1940) is a British journalist, television and radio commentator on the British royal family and an international public speaker. He was a press spokesman for Queen Elizabeth II from 1988 until 2000; in the 1996 Birthday Honours, he was appointed Lieutenant of the Royal Victorian Order (LVO).

== Biography ==
Arbiter was born to German Jewish refugee parents in 1940 during a World War II air raid on London.

After college in London, he was an actor and stage manager in South Africa and the Federation of Rhodesia and Nyasaland, where he became a television and radio news reporter. His most famous on-air slip-up occurred when he started a radio broadcast with, "I am an oil tanker, Dickie Arbiter is on fire in the Gulf." This would then go on to be immortalised by Fi Glover as the title of her book I am an Oil Tanker: Travels with My Radio.

Upon his return to the United Kingdom, he was a special events presenter for LBC and court correspondent for Independent Radio News.

His television appearances include Newsnight, BBC Breakfast, BBC News, This Morning, Larry King Live and Richard and Judy.

In March 2021, he was tricked by a fictional news company created by YouTuber pranksters Josh Pieters and Archie Manners into giving his purported reaction to the Oprah with Meghan and Harry interview two days before the interview was aired.

== Personal life ==
He is the father of Victoria Arbiter, who is a commentator on the royal family.

== Publication ==
His memoir, On Duty with the Queen: My Time as a Buckingham Palace Press Secretary, was published in October 2014. A follow-up to his 2014 memoir, titled On Duty with the Royals: The Inside Story of the Modern Monarchy, was published in September 2026.
