= Primetime Emmy Award for Outstanding Period and/or Character Hairstyling =

List of Award Winners for Character Hairstyling given by the Emmy Association

- Awarded for: Outstanding Period and/or Character Hairstyling
- Country: United States
- Presented by: Academy of Television Arts & Sciences
- Website: emmys.com

This is a list of winners and nominees of the Primetime Emmy Award for Outstanding Period and/or Character Hairstyling.

In the following list, the first titles listed in gold are the winners; those not in gold are nominees, which are listed in alphabetical order. The years given are those in which the ceremonies took place:

== Winners and nominations ==
=== 2020s ===
Year	Program	Episode	Nominees	Network
2020 (72nd)
2020 (72nd)	Hollywood	"A Hollywood Ending"	Michelle Ceglia, Barry Lee Moe, George Guzman, Michele Arvizo, Maria Elena Pantoja	Netflix
2020 (72nd)	The Crown	"Cri de Coeur"	Cate Hall, Louise Coles, Sarah Nuth, Suzanne David, Emilie Yong, Catriona Johnstone	Netflix
2020 (72nd)	The Marvelous Mrs. Maisel	"A Jewish Girl Walks Into the Apollo..."	Kimberley Spiteri, Michael S. Ward, Tijen Osman	Prime Video
2020 (72nd)	Pose	"Worth It"	Barry Lee Moe, Timothy Harvey, Sabana Majeed, Liliana Meyrick, Lisa Thomas, Greg Bazemore, Jessie Mojica, Charlene Belmond	FX
2020 (72nd)	Star Trek: Picard	"Stardust City Rag"	Maxine Morris, Maria Sandoval, Wendy Southard, Sallie Nicole Ciganovich, Ashleigh Childers, Yesim Osman	CBS All Access
