= Fairytale (The Crown) =

- The Crown episode
- Lady Diana Spencer (Emma Corrin) departs Buckingham Palace for her wedding ceremony. The series' costume designers consulted with the original dress' designers to recreate the item for this episode; the appearance of Corrin in costume on set rendered the production crew speechless.
- Episode no.: Season 4 Episode 3
- Directed by: Benjamin Caron
- Written by: Peter Morgan
- Original release date: 15 November 2020
- Running time: 56 minutes

Guest appearances
- Charles Edwards – Martin Charteris; Richard Goulding – Edward Adeane; Penny Downie – Duchess of Gloucester; Sam Phillips – Equerry; Letty Thomas – Virginia Pitman; Allegra Marland – Carolyn Pride; Flora Higgins – Anne Bolton; Judith Paris – Wendy Mitchell; Donald Douglas – Lord Chamberlain; Tim Scragg – Crown Jeweller; Georgie Glen – Ruth, Lady Fermoy; Geoffrey Breton – Mark Phillips; Rachel Donovan – Photographer 1; Matt Emery – Photographer 2; Robin Kermode – Interviewer; David Bromley – Footman; Richard Ritchie – Dean of St Paul's; Eileen Dunwoodie – Diana's Maid; John Humphrys – Newsreader (voiceover)

Episode chronology
← Previous "The Balmoral Test"	Next → "Favourites"
- The Crown season 4

"Fairytale" is the third episode of the fourth season of the historical drama television series The Crown. The 33rd episode overall, it was released on Netflix on 15 November 2020, alongside the rest of the season. "Fairytale" stars Olivia Colman, Tobias Menzies, Helena Bonham Carter, Josh O'Connor, Emma Corrin, Marion Bailey, Erin Doherty and Emerald Fennell, and was written by series creator and executive producer Peter Morgan, and directed by executive producer Benjamin Caron.

Set in 1981, the episode depicts the engagement of Charles, Prince of Wales (O'Connor) to Lady Diana Spencer (Corrin), culminating in their wedding. Diana struggles to adapt to her new position, and it becomes clear that the match is unsuitable.

"Fairytale" received critical acclaim, with particular praise given to its psychological exploration of Diana and Corrin's performance.

== Plot ==
Under pressure from his family to find a suitable wife, Charles, Prince of Wales proposes to Lady Diana Spencer. Diana celebrates her engagement and, on the advice of the Buckingham Palace staff, immediately moves into the Palace. On her arrival, she irritates Princess Margaret and has difficulty following royal protocol. She is more warmly received by the press, though Charles is evasive when asked in a television interview if the couple is in love. Charles then departs on a foreign tour, leaving Diana alone.

Diana is sternly tutored in the royal way of life by her grandmother, but is otherwise left to her own devices in the Palace. She is comforted by the wealth of supportive letters she receives from the public but is unable to arrange a meeting with Queen Elizabeth and develops bulimia. At lunch with Camilla Parker Bowles, a meeting encouraged by Charles, Diana is embarrassed over how little she knows about her fiancé in comparison to the other woman. She then discovers designs for a bracelet, apparently a gift from Charles to Camilla; she again attempts to contact Elizabeth, insisting the marriage cannot go ahead.

On his return to the country, Charles first visits Camilla but claims to Diana that both this and the bracelet were intended to end their association. Concerned by what she saw at the wedding rehearsal, Margaret later speaks out against the marriage to Elizabeth and Prince Philip. Elizabeth speaks to Charles, insisting that his duty requires the marriage to go ahead and he will come to love Diana over time. While the public celebrates their union, Charles and Diana solemnly prepare for their wedding.

== Production ==
"Fairytale" was written by Peter Morgan, the creator of The Crown, and directed by Benjamin Caron. It is the eleventh episode of the series directed by Caron and the second in the fourth season, following "Gold Stick".

Morgan chose not to depict the wedding of Charles and Diana itself, focusing instead on the couple's engagement period; according to Corrin and O'Connor, this was because the ceremony can easily be viewed on YouTube. Nevertheless, Diana's wedding dress was recreated for the episode's final moments. Costume designers Amy Roberts and Sidonie Roberts consulted with the real dress's designers, David and Elizabeth Emanuel, to recreate the item; according to Caron, seeing Corrin wearing the dress rendered the production crew speechless. Elizabeth Emanuel expressed her approval of the dress's recreation.

The episode makes significant use of popular music contemporary to its early-1980s setting, as listened to by Diana. Tracks featured include "Edge of Seventeen" by Stevie Nicks, "Girls on Film" by Duran Duran and "Song for Guy" by Elton John. In the scene where the latter track is used, where Diana performs a free-form ballet dance, Corrin elected to dance to Cher's 1998 song "Believe" during filming. The scene was initially edited to be scored by Martin Phipps's soundtrack music before John's estate agreed to the use of "Song for Guy", resulting in a stylistic departure for The Crown. An isolated vocal track of "Edge of Seventeen" is also used over the episode's end credits, by the permission of Nicks.

"Fairytale" is dedicated to the memory of Karen Smith, The Crown's location manager, who died in 2020.

== Reception ==
"Fairytale" received extremely positive reviews. In a five-star review, Vulture.com's Sarene Leeds identified the episode's unflinching depiction of the monarchy's shortcomings and the "abysmal chasm" between Diana and Charles. She summarised that "to see this well-trodden story finally played out the way it most likely did, culminating in a complete mental breakdown, is both agonizing and, strangely enough, a relief". In Medium.com, Thomas J. West further praised the depiction of Diana's eating disorder, the awkwardness of her entry into Buckingham Palace and the complexity of Charles's character.

Writing for The A.V. Club, Caroline Siede praised the episode's foregrounding of Diana's youth to imply a "medieval" aspect to her marriage to the older Charles. Siede also noted Corrin's skill in "conveying the physicality of a 19-year-old", although she felt that the episode could have held Charles accountable for her unhappiness to a greater degree. Further praise for Corrin was expressed by Meghan O'Keefe of Decider, whose analysis of her portrayal of Diana focused on moments seen in "Fairytale". Asserting that Corrin's depiction is "hands down the best onscreen Diana we've ever seen", O'Keefe praised her "technical craft" and allusions to her "hidden despair".
