= Tom Howe (musician) =

British musician (born 1977)

- Born: 26 December 1977 (age 48); London, England
- Genres: Film and television scores, jazz, electronic, rock, new-age
- Occupations: Composer, conductor, multi-instrumentalist, performer, music producer
- Instruments: Vocals, piano, keyboards, synthesizer, guitar, bass guitar, banjo, mandolin, drums, percussion, clarinet
- Years active: 2008–present
- Website: tomhowemusic.com

Tom Howe (born 26 December 1977) is a British composer, conductor, multi-instrumentalist, and musician who has worked on over 100 films and television series.

== Career ==
Growing up in a musical family, he was classically trained on piano, clarinet, and guitar.

After attending the University of Edinburgh in Scotland, he became a session musician in both classical and contemporary spheres, working with multiple bands. He began writing for TV in 2008, with music credits for the BBC production How The Celts Saved Britain presented by Dan Snow. In 2011 he co-wrote with Gary Go on the theatrical release Love's Kitchen. Howe developed a close working relationship with established composers and brothers Harry and Rupert Gregson-Williams and then worked on multiple major TV series and movies including Wonder Woman, Professor Marston and the Wonder Women, Early Man, A Shaun the Sheep Movie: Farmageddon, Mulan, Ted Lasso, The People We Hate at the Wedding, Knuckles, Dog Man and Reminders of Him.

Other work includes music for the television series The Great British Bake Off, Taskmaster, Whiskey Cavalier, Paranormal Witness, and The Lodge. After working with Bill Lawrence on Whiskey Cavalier, Howe was asked to create music for Ted Lasso, a new Apple TV+ series, with Marcus Mumford In June 2020, Howe was made a member of the Academy of Motion Picture Arts and Sciences.

== Film ==
Year	Title	Director(s)	Studio(s)	Notes
2014	Hate from a Distance	Dan Ireland	Privarte Pictures	Co-composed with Harry Gregson-Williams
2014	Exodus: Gods and Kings	Ridley Scott	20th Century Fox	Additional music Composed by Alberto Iglesias
2015	Monkey Kingdom	Mark Linfield; Alastair Fothergill	Disneynature	Additional music Composed by Harry Gregson-Williams
2016	Is That a Gun in Your Pocket?	Matt Cooper	The Vault	Composer
2016	Open Season: Scared Silly	David Feiss	Sony Pictures Animation; Sony Pictures Home Entertainment	Additional music Composed by Rupert Gregson-Williams and Dominic Lewis
2016	The Do-Over	Steven Brill	Netflix	Additional music Composed by Rupert Gregson-Williams
2016	The Legend of Tarzan	David Yates	Warner Bros. Pictures	Additional music Composed by Rupert Gregson-Williams
2017	Lost & Found	Joseph Itaya	Sony Pictures Home Entertainment	Composer
2017	Wonder Woman	Patty Jenkins	Warner Bros. Pictures	Additional music Composed by Rupert Gregson-Williams
2017	Professor Marston and the Wonder Women	Angela Robinson	Annapurna Pictures	Composer
2018	Early Man	Nick Park	StudioCanal	Co-composed with Harry Gregson-Williams
2019	A Shaun the Sheep Movie: Farmageddon	Richard Phelan; Will Becher	StudioCanal	Composer
2019	Charming	Ross Venokur	Vanguard Animation	Composer
2020	Mulan	Niki Caro	Walt Disney Pictures	Themes by Jerry Goldsmith; Additional music with Stephanie Economou; Composed by Harry Gregson-Williams
2021	Shaun The Sheep: The Flight Before Christmas	Steve Cox	Netflix	Composer
2021	Freddie Mercury - The Final Act	James Rogan	BBC	Composer
2021	Ted Lasso: The Missing Christmas Mustache	Jed Hathaway	Apple TV+	Co-composed with Marcus Mumford
2022	Minions & Monsters	Chloë Lesueur; Jed Diffenderfer	Universal Pictures	Composer, short film
2022	The Amazing Maurice	Toby Genkel; Florian Westermann	Ulysses Filmproduktion	Composer
2022	Shattered	Luis Prieto	Lionsgate Studios	Composer
2022	The People We Hate at the Wedding	Clare Scanlon	Amazon Studios	Composer
2023	Rally Road Racers	Ross Venokur	REP Productions 6 Ltd. Kintop Pictures; Riverstone Pictures; Vanguard Animation	Composer
2024	10 Lives	Chris Jenkins	GFM Animation; L'Atelier Animation	Co-composed with Geoff Zanelli
2025	Dog Man	Peter Hastings	Universal Pictures	Composer
2025	Zombies 4: Dawn of the Vampires	Paul Hoen	Disney Channel	Composer
2025	Merv	Jessica Swale	Amazon MGM Studios	Composer
2026	Reminders of Him	Vanessa Caswill	Universal Pictures	Composer
2026	Daffy Season	Todd Wilderman; Hamish Grieve	Warner Bros. Pictures	Composer, short film
2027	CoComelon: The Movie	Kat Good	Universal Pictures; DreamWorks Animation	Composer

== Television credits ==
Year	Title	People Associated	Studio
2009	How The Celts Saved Britain	Director: Steven Clark	BBC
2009	Life	Producer: Martha Holmes	BBC
2010	Directors Season	Director: Grant Berry	Sky TV
2010	Total Player	Series Producer: Aisling Collins	Sky TV
2010	America: The Story of Us	Directors: Richard Bedser, Hugh Ballantyne, Jenny Ash	Nutopia
2010	Games That Time Forgot	Director: Andy Devonshire	Avalon / BBC
2010	The Great British Bake Off - Series 1	Director: Andy Devonshire	BBC
2011	Love Thy Neighbours	Series Producer: Chloe Court	Channel 4
2011	The Great British Bake Off - Series 2	Director: Andy Devonshire	BBC
2011	Four Rooms	Director: Andy Devonshire	Channel 4
2011	The Great British Weather	Series Producer: Denis O'Connor	BBC
2011	Seconds from Disaster - Series 4	Series Producer: Tom Adams	National Geographic
2011	Paranormal Witness	Series Producer: Mark Lewis	SyFy
2011	Seconds from Disaster - Series 5	Series Producer: Tom Adams	National Geographic
2011	Home for The Holidays	Series Producer: Denis O'Connor	Channel 4
2012	Four In A Bed - Series 3	Series Producer: Mike Cotton	Channel 4
2012	Trade Your Way To The USA - Series 2	Head of Format: Charlie Bunce	BBC
2012	Four Rooms - Series 2	Series Director: Andy Devonshire	Talkback Thames / Channel 4
2012	National Treasures Jubilee Special	Series Producer: Amanda Lyon	BBC
2012	Seconds from Disaster Series 6	Series Producer: Tom Adams	Darlow Smithson / National Geographic
2012	Paranormal Witness - Season 2	Series Producer: Simon Mills	RAW TV / Syfy
2012	The Great British Bake Off - Series 3	Director: Andy Devonshire	Love Productions / BBC
2012	Mankind: The Story of All of Us	Executive Producers: Jane Root & Ben Goold	Nutopia / History Channel
2013	Four in a Bed - Series 4	Series Producer: Tom Whitrow	Studio Lambert / Channel 4
2013	Nursing The Nation	Series Producer: Alf Lawrie	Shine / ITV
2013	Mankind Decoded	Executive Producers: Jane Root & Ben Goold	Nutopia / History Channel
2013	Locked Up Abroad - Series 9	Series Producer: Richard Bond	RAW TV / National Geographic
2013	Paul Hollywood's Bread	Series Director: David Robertson	Love Productions / BBC
2013	Trade Your Way To The USA - Series 3	Head of Format: Charlie Bunce	Leopard Films / BBC
2013	Perspectives: Jonathan Ross: Alfred Hitchcock - Made in Britain	Director: Andy Devonshire	Hot Sauce TV / ITV
2013	Paranormal Witness - Season 3	Series Producer: Mark Lewis	RAW TV / Syfy
2013	The Great British Bake Off - Series 4	Series Producer: Amanda Westwood	Love Productions / BBC
2013	Five Aside	Producers: Carol Ann and Aileen Docherty	Emerald Films
2013	Four in a Bed - Series 5	Series Producer: Tom Whitrow	Studio Lambert / Channel 4
2013	The Face	Series Director: Alf Lawrie	Princess TV / Sky Living
2014	Autopsy	Series Director: James Tovell	ITV Productions / Channel 5
2014	Hair	Series Producer: Ceri Jones	BBC
2014	Mary Berry	Series Director: Scott Tankard	Love Productions / BBC
2014	Inside Holloway	Series Director: Duncan Bulling	Channel 5
2014	The Great British Bake Off - Series 5	Series Director: Andy Devonshire	BBC
2014	Autopsy: The Last Hours of - Series 2	Series Producer/Director: Kevin Lane	Channel 5
2014	Britain's Bloodiest Dynasty	Series Producer: David Wilson	Channel 5
2015	Paranormal Witness - Season 4	Series Producer: Mark Lewis	RAW TV / Syfy
2015	Autopsy: The Last Hours of - Series 3	Series Producer/Director: Kevin Lane	Channel 5
2015	The Brain with David Eagleman	Producers: Justine Kershaw, Jennifer Beamish	Blink Films / PBS
2015	Finding Jesus. Faith. Fact. Forgery.	Series Producer: Simon Breen	CNN
2015	The Great British Bake Off - Series 6	Series Director: Andy Devonshire	BBC
2015	Truly, Madly, Wembley	Director: Kevin Lane	BBC
2015	Witch Hunt	Series Director: Chris Holt	Channel 5
2015	Raised Human	Series Producer: Tom Adams	Animal Planet / Blink Films
2015	Britain's Bloody Crown	Series Director: Nick Green	Channel 5
2016	Web Of Lies	Series Producer: Gillian Pachter	Discovery ID
2016	The Lodge	Series Directors: Matt Bloom, Dez McCarthy	Disney Channel
2017	Africa's Great Civilizations	Series Producer: Ben Goold	PBS
2017	Finding Jesus - Season 2	Series Producer: Ben Goold, Jane Root	CNN
2017	The Lodge - Season 2	Series Director: Dez McCarthy	Disney Channel
2018	I Am A Killer - Season 1	Series Producer: Ned Parker	Netflix
2019	Jesus His Life	Series Producer: Ben Goold	History Channel
2019	Detroit: Comeback City	Series Producer: Jane Root	History Channel
2019	The Last Czars	Series Producer: Ben Goold	Netflix
2019	Catch 22	Series Producer: George Clooney	Hulu
2019	Whiskey Cavalier	Series Producer: Bill Lawrence	ABC
2020	Babies	Series Producer: Jane Root	Netflix
2020	I Am A Killer - Season 2	Series Producer: Ned Parker	Netflix
2020	Killer Uncaged	Series Producer: Ned Parker	Netflix
2020	Ted Lasso - Season 1	Series Producers: Bill Lawrence, Jason Sudeikis	Apple TV+ / Universal Television / Warner Bros. Television
2020	World Of Calm	Featuring: Nicole Kidman, Keanu Reeves, Idris Elba	Nutopia / HBO Max
2020	Hip Hop Vs. Trump	Director: Carl Hindmarch	
2021	Carlos Ghosn: The Last Flight	Director: Nick Green	Alef One / BBC Storyville / MBC Studios
2021	Head of the Class	Creators: Seth Cohen, Michael Elias, Rich Eustis	HBO Max
2021	Ted Lasso - Season 2	Creators: Brendan Hunt, Joe Kelly, Bill Lawrence	Apple TV+ / Universal Television / Warner Bros. Television
2021	The Mating Game	Featuring David Attenborough	Discovery Channel / Discovery+ / Silverback Films
2022	The Great Pottery Throwdown	Featuring: Keith Brymer-Jones, Richard Miller, Sara Cox	Love Productions
2023	Shrinking	Creator: Bill Lawrence	Apple TV+ / Universal Television / Warner Bros. Television
2023	Daisy Jones & The Six	Developed by: Scott Neustadter, Michael H. Weber	Amazon MGM Studios
2023	Ted Lasso - Season 3	Series Producers: Bill Lawrence, Jason Sudeikis	Apple TV+ / Universal Television / Warner Bros. Television
2024	Knuckles	Creators: John Whittington, Toby Ascher	Paramount+
2026	Every Year After	Developed by Amy B. Harris & Leila Gerstein	Amazon MGM Studios
2026	Ted Lasso - Season 4	Series Producers: Bill Lawrence, Jason Sudeikis	Apple TV / Universal Television / Warner Bros. Television

== Awards and nominations ==
In 2018, Howe was nominated for Best Score for a Feature Film at the Film Music Festival Jerry Goldsmith Awards for his work on Professor Marston and the Wonder Women. In 2019, he received a nomination at the 46th Annie Awards from ASIFA for Outstanding Achievement for Music in an Animated Feature Production, for Early Man, shared with Harry Gregson-Williams.

Howe received two nominations at the 2020 Hollywood Music In Media Awards: one for Outstanding Score—Animated Film for his work on A Shaun the Sheep Movie: Farmageddon and one for Original Score—TV Show/Limited Series for Ted Lasso. In 2020, he was awarded the 2020 ASCAP Screen Music Award for Top Television Series, for his work on Whiskey Cavalier, and also the Discovery of the Year at the World Soundtrack Awards at Film Fest Ghent for his work on A Shaun the Sheep Movie: Farmageddon.

In 2021 Howe received an Emmy nomination for Outstanding Original Main Title Theme Music and a 2021 Hollywood Music In Media Awards (HMMA) nomination for Score - TV Show/Limited Series with Marcus Mumford for their collaboration on Ted Lasso's opening title. In 2023, Howe received an Emmy nomination for Outstanding Original Music And Lyrics for the song "Fought & Lost" for the Ted Lasso episode "Mom City," co-written with Jamie Hartman and Sam Ryder.
