= How We Got to Now =

- Genre: Factual
- Presented by: Steven Johnson
- Country of origin: United Kingdom
- Original language: English
- No. of series: 1
- No. of episodes: 6

Production
- Producer: Diene Petterle
- Running time: 60 minutes
- Production companies: Nutopia; PBS

Original release
- Network: BBC One; BBC One HD

How We Got to Now is a British-American factual television series that was broadcast on PBS in 2014 and BBC Two in 2015. The series was commissioned by the BBC in the United Kingdom and made by Nutopia, a British-American production company in the United States. The six-part series, presented by Steven Johnson, explores the legacy of great ideas.

== Production ==
The factual series is a co-production between Nutopia, a British-American production company, and PBS. The producer is Diene Petterle, a Brazilian-born British film, television and theatrical producer, and the executive producers are Jane Root, Peter Lovering, and Michael Jackson. A companion book was published by Riverhead Books and a companion website has been created to explore present day innovations. The show was distributed by BBC Worldwide and received funding from the CPB/PBS Program Challenge Fund.

== Episodes ==
1. Clean - from sewers to clean rooms
2. Time - from pendulum clocks to radiometric dating
3. Glass - from cristallo to smart phones
4. Light - from spermaceti oil to fusion reactors
5. Cold - from ice harvesting to air conditioning
6. Sound - from phonautograph to ultrasound imaging

The historical characters who appear include Thomas Edison, Clarence Birdseye, Frederick McKinley Jones, Willis Carrier, Tim Berners-Lee, Hedy Lamarr, and Mark Zuckerberg.

== Broadcast ==
The series premiered in the US in the fall of 2014 on PBS. The series also premiered in Australia on ABC from 26 February 2015.

== Reception ==
Robert Lloyd of Los Angeles Times wrote, "Thought-provoking and fun to watch."

== Awards ==
Peepshow Collective won Outstanding Motion Design at the 67th Emmy Awards in 2015 for their work on the series.

== See also ==
- Connections (British documentary)
