= Jesus: His Life =

British television series

- Genre: Drama
- Directed by: Ashley Pearce; Adrian McDowall
- Country of origin: United Kingdom
- Original language: English
- No. of seasons: 1
- No. of episodes: 8

Production
- Executive producer: Evan Lerner
- Producers: Alex Dwiar; Josh Hyams; Lindy Taylor; Ned Dowd; Ben Goold; Jane Root
- Cinematography: Tom Pridham, Dirk Nel
- Editors: Trevor Brown; Alan Bishop
- Running time: 43 minutes
- Production company: Nutopia

Original release
- Network: History Channel
- Release: 25 March – 15 April 2019

Jesus: His Life is a British drama TV series about the life of Jesus told by the closest people to him. It is interviewed and consulted by a diverse group of scholars such as Robert Cargill, Father Jonathan Morris, Reverend Gabriel Salguero, and Pastor Susan Sparks. The eight episode series premiered on 25 March 2019 on the History Channel, and was broadcast as two new episodes each Monday, ending 15 April 2019. Youssef Louchi served as location manager on the series.

== Cast and characters ==
- Greg Barnett as Jesus
- Houda Echouafni as Mother Mary
- Cassie Bradley as Mary Magdalene
- Adam Ayadi as Andrew
- Robert R. Cargill as himself
- Mark Goodacre as himself
- John Hopkins as Peter
- Doug Rao as John the Baptist
- Amed Hashimi as Judah
- David Al-Fahmi as Nicodemus
- Daniel Ben Zenou as Malchus
- Candida R. Moss as herself
- Youssef Tounzi as The Man
- Bamshad Abedi-Amin as Lazarus
- Abhin Galeya as Judas
- Alex Gok as James
- Wendy Glenn as Herodias.
- Leilah Isaac as Salome
- Ramin Karimloo as Joseph
- Anthony Kaye as Angel Gabriel
- Mavin Rasheed as Mary, the sister of Martha
- Elif Knight as Martha
- Gerald Kyd as Caiaphas
- Amra Mallassi as Cleopas
- Liran Nathan as The Shepherd
- Madison Clare as Young Mary
- Gary Oliver as King Herod the Great
- Mavin Rasheed as Sister Mary
- Moumouni Seydou as Angel
- Michael S. Siegel as Joseph of Arimathea
- Stephanie Vogt as Claudia Procles
- Anthony Barclay as Herod Antipas
- Jason Merrells as Pilate
- Rez Kabir as Satan

== Episodes ==
No. overall	No. in season	Title	Directed by	Written by	Original release date	Viewers (millions)
1	1	"Joseph: The Nativity"	Unknown	Unknown	25 March 2019	N/A
2	2	"John the Baptist: The Mission"	Unknown	Unknown	25 March 2019	N/A
3	3	"Mary: The First Miracles"	Unknown	Unknown	1 April 2019	N/A
4	4	"Caiaphas: The Raising of Lazarus"	Unknown	Unknown	1 April 2019	N/A
5	5	"Judas: The Betrayal"	Unknown	Unknown	8 April 2019	N/A
6	6	"Pilate: The Trial"	Unknown	Unknown	8 April 2019	N/A
7	7	"Mary Magdalene: The Crucifixion"	Unknown	Unknown	15 April 2019	N/A
8	8	"Peter: The Resurrection"	Unknown	Unknown	15 April 2019	N/A
