= One Strange Rock =

American documentary television series

- Genre: Nature documentary
- Developed by: Nutopia
- Directed by: Graham Booth; Nicholas Jordan; Alice Jones; Christopher Riley; Nat Sharman; Nic Stacey
- Starring: Will Smith; Chris Hadfield
- Composers: Daniel Pemberton; Simon Ashdown; Will Slater; Zedd
- Country of origin: United States
- Original language: English
- No. of seasons: 1
- No. of episodes: 10

Production
- Executive producers: Darren Aronofsky; Jane Root; Arif Nurmohamed; Peter Lovering
- Producers: Glenn Barden; Nigel Walk
- Cinematography: Philip Barthropp; Simon de Glanville; Brendan McGinty; Paolo Nespoli; Kevin White; Johnny Rogers; Patrick Lavaud
- Editors: Doug Moxon; Graeme Dawson; Bill Coates; Ben Lavington Martin; Paul Crosby; Paul Crompton; Julian Rodd
- Running time: 60 min
- Production company: Nutopia

Original release
- Network: National Geographic
- Release: March 26 – May 28, 2018

One Strange Rock is an American television documentary series, produced by Nutopia in conjunction with Darren Aronofsky, which premiered on National Geographic on March 26, 2018. On July 25, 2018, National Geographic renewed the series for a second season. Season 2 was expected to premiere in March 2020 on National Geographic, but was reworked into a new series in 2021 called Welcome to Earth.

== Premise ==
One Strange Rock tells the story of how life survives and thrives on planet Earth, as told by eight astronauts from their unique perspective of being away from Earth (for about 1000 days).

== Cast ==
Hosted by actor Will Smith, One Strange Rock features contributions from astronauts Chris Hadfield, Nicole Stott, Jeffrey A. Hoffman, Mae Jemison, Leland Melvin, Mike Massimino, Jerry Linenger, and Peggy Whitson.

== Episodes ==
No.	Title	Directed by	Original release date	US viewers (millions)
1	"Gasp"	Graham Booth	March 26, 2018	0.71
2	"Storm"	Nat Sharman	April 2, 2018	0.51
3	"Shield"	Nic Stacey	April 9, 2018	0.75
4	"Genesis"	Nick Shoolingin-Jordan	April 16, 2018	0.61
5	"Survival"	Christopher Riley	April 23, 2018	0.46
6	"Escape"	Graham Booth	April 30, 2018	0.48
7	"Terraform"	Nic Stacey	May 7, 2018	0.49
8	"Alien"	Nat Sharman	May 14, 2018	0.52
9	"Awakening"	Nick Shoolingin-Jordan	May 21, 2018	0.43
10	"Home"	Alice Jones	May 28, 2018	0.48

== Release ==
The documentary was released on Netflix streaming on February 1, 2019. In the United States, it left Netflix for Disney+ on January 1, 2020.
