= Richard Machowicz =

American actor (1965–2017)

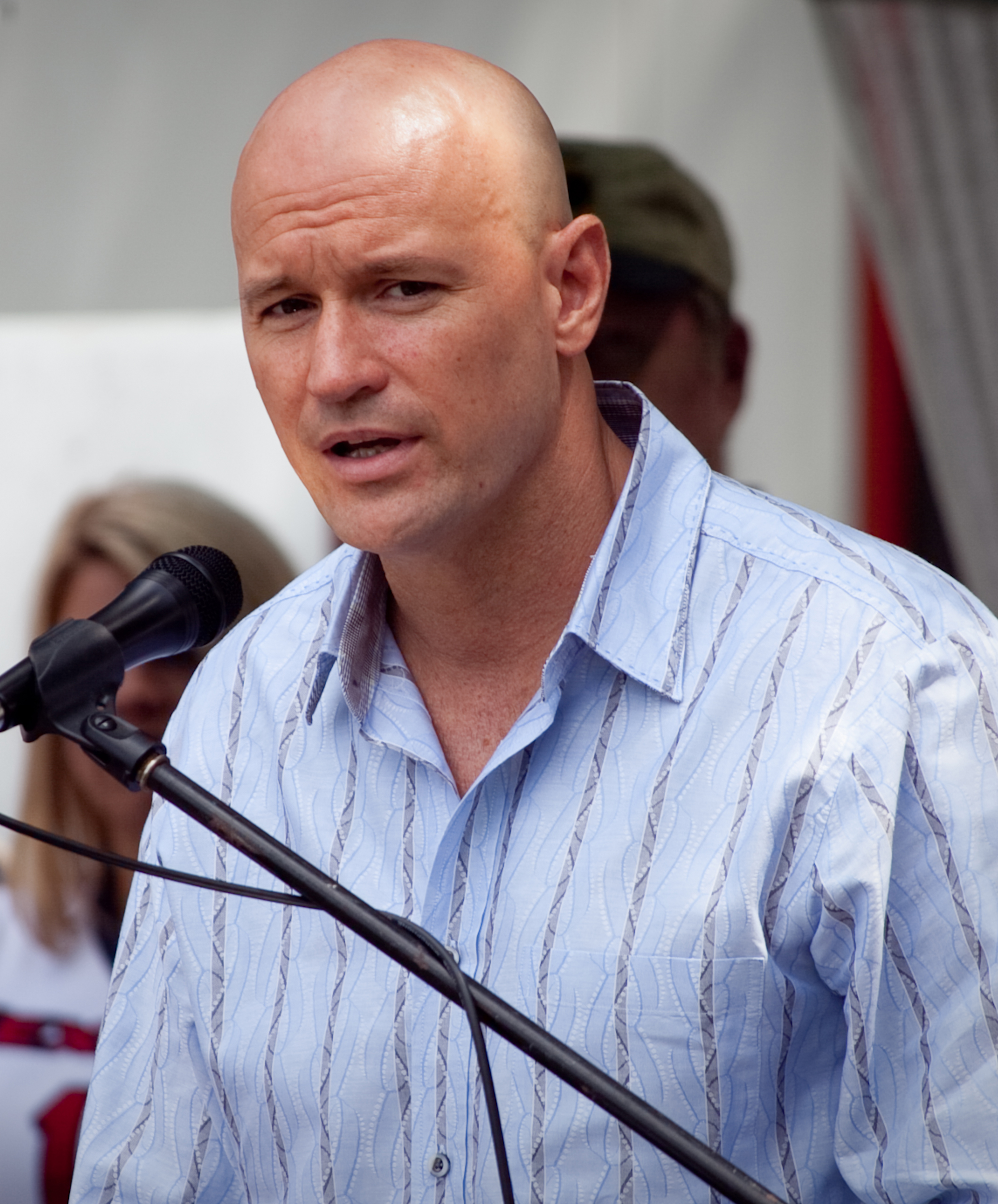
- Machowicz in August 2010
- Born: May 30, 1965; Detroit, Michigan, U.S.
- Died: January 2, 2017 (aged 51); Pearland, Texas, U.S.
- Military career
- Allegiance: United States of America
- Branch: United States Navy
- Service years: 1984–1995
- Nickname: "Mack"
- Units: United States Navy SEALs: SEAL Team One; SEAL Team two
- Other work: Author; TV show host

Richard John "Mack" Machowicz (/ˈmækəwɪts/ MACK-ə-wits; May 30, 1965 – January 2, 2017) was a Navy SEAL and the host of the Discovery Channel and Military Channel show Future Weapons. He was the newest member on Spike's show Deadliest Warrior.

== Biography ==
Machowicz was born in 1965 in Detroit, Michigan. Machowicz joined the United States Navy in 1985 and graduated from Basic Underwater Demolition/SEAL training (BUD/S) class 136 in February 1986. Following SEAL Tactical Training (STT) and completion of six month probationary period, he received the NEC 5326 as a Combatant Swimmer (SEAL), entitled to wear the Special Warfare insignia also known as ""SEAL Trident"". According to his biography on the Discovery Channel's Web site, "he participated in numerous tactical operations with SEAL Team ONE and TWO. While operating at SEAL Team TWO, he was a Naval Special Warfare Scout/Sniper, as well as being attached to the training cadre as the Leading Petty Officer of Land, Mountain and Arctic Warfare."

He founded the Bukido Institute, as well as the Bukido Training System, which "teaches a performance philosophy that uses unarmed combat as a pathway for exploring the dynamics of doubt, hesitation, second-guessing, stress, pain, fatigue and fear." He served as a personal protection specialist for many high-profile individuals within the political arena, business world and entertainment industry.

Though a Catholic, Machowicz was also a practitioner of Zen Buddhism and an ordained Buddhist priest.

On January 2, 2017, aged 51, Machowicz died of brain cancer in Pearland, Texas. He was survived by his wife, Mandy Leggio Machowicz, two daughters, and his parents. His funeral Mass was celebrated on January 6, 2017, at St. Helen Catholic Church, Pearland, Texas.

== Selected filmography ==
- Pensacola: Wings of Gold (1998; 1 episode)
- The Gift (2005; TV host)
- FutureWeapons (30 episodes, 2005–08; host and producer)
- Rome Is Burning (1 episode, 2008)
- Gamer (2009) as "Blue Soldier"
- America: The Story of Us (6 episodes, 2010)
- Deadliest Warrior (10 episodes, 2011; TV host)
- Mankind: The Story of All of Us (12 episodes 2012)
- Ultimate Soldier Challenge (6 episodes, 2013)

== Bibliography ==
- Unleash the Warrior Within: Develop the Focus, Discipline, Confidence and Courage You Need to Achieve Unlimited Goals (2002); ISBN 1-56924-497-9
