= Future perfect (disambiguation) =

The future perfect is a grammatical construction.

Future perfect may also refer to:

- Future Perfect (Autolux album) (2004)
- Future Perfect (Loadstar album) (2013)
- Future Perfect (book), by Steven Johnson (2012)
- Future Perfect (video game), in development
- Future Perfect (Vox column), a column on the Vox website launched in 2018
- "Future Perfect (Pass The Mic)", a 2022 song by Enhypen on the EP Manifesto: Day 1
- Futureperfect, a 2002 album by VNV Nation
- TimeSplitters Future Perfect, a 2005 video game developed by Free Radical Design

== See also ==
- Future tense
- Perfect (grammar)
- Past Perfect Future Tense, a Magne F. album
- "Future Imperfect", an episode of Star Trek: The Next Generation
