= Gary Oliver =

Gary Oliver may refer to:

- Gary Oliver (footballer)
- Gary Oliver (actor)
