= The World According to Jeff Goldblum =

2019 American documentary television series presented by Jeff Goldblum

- Genre: Docuseries
- Developed by: National Geographic
- Presented by: Jeff Goldblum
- Country of origin: United States
- Original language: English
- No. of seasons: 2
- No. of episodes: 22

Production
- Executive producers: Jeff Goldblum; Matt Renner; Jane Root; Peter Lovering; Arif Nurmohamed; Keith Addis
- Running time: 30 min
- Production companies: National Geographic Studios; Nutopia

Original release
- Network: Disney+
- Release: November 12, 2019 – January 19, 2022

The World According to Jeff Goldblum is an American documentary television series presented by Jeff Goldblum streaming on Disney+ from November 12, 2019.

The second season premiered on November 12, 2021. The series was removed from Disney+ on May 26, 2023.

== Premise ==
The premise of the show is, because it's the world according to Jeff Goldblum, it's me with all the information and experience that my life has entailed up til this point now plopping me I go the world of and exploration of one thing or another. It's not as if I do some extra homework/research/bone up on it so that I tend to know something about it and then tell you about it. No, it's not like that.

— Jeff Goldblum, host

The series follows Jeff, in which he 'explores the world'. He does this by covering topics such as video games, ice-creams and sneakers by chatting with influencers and experts with broad knowledge and experience in these particular subjects.

== Production ==
The show was announced as part of the National Geographic presentation during Disney's investor meeting on April 11, 2019 for Disney+.

=== Filming ===
The production started in April 2019. During filming, Jeff Goldblum researched as little as possible on the topics being presented on the show. He explores a wide range of products including sneakers, ice creams, tattoos and bicycles.

Topics for the second season had been planned, and shooting had begun in early 2020, before being shut down as a consequence of COVID-19 restrictions. The first episode was due to be on fireworks, and Goldblum had apparently filmed an interview with an astronaut for the series. Despite Goldblum's uncertainty as to whether or not this material would be used once filming resumed, both of these segments appeared in episodes of Season 2.

As of yet there has been no official announcement about a third season, although Goldblum expressed an interest in continuation of the series.

== Episodes ==
Season	Episodes		Originally released	
Season	Episodes		First released	Last released
1	12		November 12, 2019	January 24, 2020
2	10	5	November 12, 2021	
2	10	5	January 19, 2022	

=== Season 1 (2019–20) ===
No. overall	No. in season	Title	Original release date
1	1	"Sneakers"	November 12, 2019
2	2	"Ice Cream"	November 15, 2019
3	3	"Tattoos"	November 22, 2019
4	4	"Denim"	November 29, 2019
5	5	"BBQ"	December 6, 2019
6	6	"Gaming"	December 13, 2019
7	7	"Bikes"	December 20, 2019
8	8	"RVs"	December 27, 2019
9	9	"Coffee"	January 3, 2020
10	10	"Cosmetics"	January 10, 2020
11	11	"Pools"	January 17, 2020
12	12	"Jewelry"	January 24, 2020

=== Season 2 (2021–22) ===
No. overall	No. in season	Title	Original release date
Part 1
13	1	"Dogs"	November 12, 2021
14	2	"Dance"	November 12, 2021
15	3	"Magic"	November 12, 2021
16	4	"Fireworks"	November 12, 2021
17	5	"Monsters"	November 12, 2021
Part 2
18	6	"Tiny Things"	January 19, 2022
19	7	"Puzzles"	January 19, 2022
20	8	"Motorcycles"	January 19, 2022
21	9	"Birthdays"	January 19, 2022
22	10	"Backyards"	January 19, 2022

== Release ==
The first episode of the series made its debut on November 12, 2019, the launch date of Disney+. The episodes were released weekly in 4K HDR.

The first five episodes of season 2 launched on November 12, 2021, which Disney called Disney+ Day, with the rest of season 2 to follow on January 19, 2022.

=== Promotion ===
Disney+ released the first look poster on August 23, 2019 coinciding with its panel at D23 Expo. Later during their presentation they released the full trailer.

== Reception ==
=== Critical response ===
The review aggregator website Rotten Tomatoes reported an 82% approval rating for the first season with an average rating of 7.60/10, based on 22 reviews. The website's critical consensus reads, "While fans of the man will find much to like in this quirky and upbeat -- if not terribly educational -- docuseries, those not already attuned to his particular sense of style may not appreciate The World According to Jeff Goldblum's singular view." Metacritic, which uses a weighted average, assigned a score of 64 out of 100 based on 8 critics, indicating "generally favorable reviews".

Daniel Fienberg of The Hollywood Reporter called the series entertaining and pleasurable, found Jeff Goldblum to be an enthusiastic and performative host who is genuinely interested in the topics covered across the show, and appreciated that the series focuses more on curiosity and amusement than providing an educational experience. Joel Keller of Decider found Jeff Goldblum to be an entertaining presenter, stating the actor manages to turn everyday life topics into interesting and quirky ones. Joyce Slaton of Common Sense Media rated the series 4 out of 5 stars, complimented the depiction of positive messages, such as curiosity, and found Goldblum to be an easy-going presenter who is interested in the topics he covers. James White of Empire rated the show 4 out of 5 stars, stated that Goldblum manages to be a friendly and optimistic host through the series, and found the animation providing factual information vivid.

=== Accolades ===
Year	Award	Category	Nominee(s)	Result	Ref.
2020	Primetime Creative Arts Emmy Awards	Outstanding Hosted Nonfiction Series or Special	Jeff Goldblum, Jane Root, Peter Lovering, Keith Addis, Matt Renner, Arif Nurmohamed, and John Hodgson	Nominated	
2022	Hollywood Critics Association TV Awards	Best Streaming Docuseries or Non-Fiction Series	The World According to Jeff Goldblum	Nominated	
2022	Primetime Creative Arts Emmy Awards	Outstanding Hosted Nonfiction Series or Special	Jeff Goldblum, Jane Root, Sara Brailsford, Keith Addis, Matt Renner, Chris Kugelman, and John Hodgson	Nominated	
