= America: The Story of Us =

2010 American documentary TV miniseries

- Genre: Documentary; History
- Written by: Ed Fields; Dan Hall
- Narrated by: Liev Schreiber; Danny Webb (international version)
- Theme music composer: Anne Nikitin; John Hardy (4 episodes); Stuart Fox (4 episodes)
- Country of origin: United States
- Original language: English
- No. of episodes: 12

Production
- Cinematography: Giulio Biccari
- Running time: 540 minutes
- Production company: Nutopia

Original release
- Network: History
- Release: April 25 – May 31, 2010

Related
- Australia: The Story of Us; Canada: The Story of Us; Mankind: The Story of All of Us

America: The Story of Us (also internationally known as America: The Story of the U.S.) is a 12-part, 9-hour documentary-drama television miniseries that premiered on April 25, 2010, on History. Produced by Nutopia, the program portrays more than 400 years of American history (with emphasis on how American creation of new technologies has had effects on the nation's history and, by implication, the world). It spans time from the successful English settlement of Jamestown beginning in 1607, through to the present day. Narrated by Liev Schreiber (Danny Webb for the international version), the series recreates many historical events by using actors dressed in the style of the period and computer-generated special effects. The miniseries received mixed reviews by critics; but it attracted the largest audiences of any special aired by the channel to date.

== Episodes ==
No.	Title	Original release date	U.S. viewers (millions)
1	"Rebels"	April 25, 2010	5.674
From Jamestown to Plymouth, early settlers fight for survival. Tobacco sows the seeds of opportunity; the north becomes a powerhouse of trade. Tension, taxation, and resistance cause the American colonists to begin doing what many consider impossible: to successfully rebel against the British Crown.
2	"Revolution"	April 25, 2010	5.674
George Washington's army is near defeat, but new weapons and battle tactics turn the tide. The colonies declare independence from the British. Forged through revolution, a new nation is born.
3	"Westward"	May 2, 2010	3.881
Trailblazing pioneers set out to conquer the west in the mid-19th century, but find the land already occupied. Wagon trains meet hardship on the road to California's gold. The steamboat ushers in a new era of commerce, industry, and unprecedented wealth.
4	"Division"	May 2, 2010	3.881
Commerce and industry thrive across the new nation, now one of the wealthiest in the world. The Erie Canal brings big risk and bigger reward. In the South, cotton is king but slavery fuels a growing divide. Violence flares across the territories and abolitionists make a stand for freedom. The election of Abraham Lincoln is a catalyst of war.
5	"Civil War"	May 9, 2010	3.281
The American Civil War rages. The formidable Confederate army cannot match the Union's mastery of technology; railroads, manufacturing capacity, supply lines and the telegraph become new weapons in a modern war.
6	"Heartland"	May 9, 2010	3.281
The Transcontinental Railroad unites the nation and transforms the American Heartland. Native American civilizations decline as farmers settle the continent. Cattle replace wild buffalo as king of the Great Plains. The cowboy becomes a new American icon.
7	"Cities"	May 16, 2010	N/A
Americans conquer a new frontier: the modern city, with Andrew Carnegie's empire of steel as its backbone. Skyscrapers and the Statue of Liberty are symbols of the American Dream for millions of immigrants. Urban life introduces a new breed of social ills, causing several bold individuals to make a stand.
8	"Boom"	May 16, 2010	N/A
America strikes oil and the boom time begins. Henry Ford brings the motorcar to the masses and the nation hits the road. Massive engineering projects modernize the American West. Intended to cure vice, Prohibition fuels the growth of organized crime in burgeoning cities, as well as widespread moonshine production and bootlegging in many rural areas, and smuggling around the Great Lakes.
9	"Bust"	May 23, 2010	2.759
Boom turns to bust when the stock market crashes. The Great Depression and the Dust Bowl blanket the nation in darkness. President Franklin D. Roosevelt's New Deal signals recovery, while the boxer Joe Louis overcomes racial disputes to help bring America's pride back.
10	"World War II"	May 23, 2010	2.759
The attack on Pearl Harbor brings America into World War II. The war effort revitalizes the nation's economy. American innovation and manufacturing invigorate the Allies in Europe and in the Pacific; nuclear weapons help end the war. A new global superpower takes the stage.
11	"Superpower"	May 31, 2010	N/A
America becomes a global superpower; technology fuels a boom in the economy and the population. American pioneers conquer new frontiers, from the jet age to the space age, and perceive a new threat: Communism.
12	"Millennium"	May 31, 2010	N/A
The Cold War is the first test for the new superpower. The Space Shuttle Challenger disaster and the September 11 attacks are tragedies that challenge the nation. From the television to the credit card and the personal computer, technology drives America into the 21st Century.

== Commentators ==
The following are commentators who appear on the miniseries (listed in alphabetical order):

- Buzz Aldrin – Former astronaut and second person to set foot on the Moon.
- David Baldacci – Bestselling American novelist.
- Tony Bennett – Singer.
- Michael Bloomberg – Former Mayor of New York City.
- William Bodette – Marine first sergeant.
- Anthony Bourdain – American chef and writer.
- H.W. Brands – Historian and Professor of History at University of Texas at Austin.
- Tom Brokaw – Journalist and former anchor of NBC Nightly News.
- Albert Camarillo – History professor at Stanford University.
- Margaret Cho – Comedian, actress, and activist.
- Sean "Diddy" Combs – Record producer, rapper, and actor.
- Sheryl Crow – Singer-songwriter, musician, and actress.
- Michael Douglas – Actor and producer.
- Melissa Etheridge – Singer-songwriter.
- Henry Louis Gates Jr. – Harvard University professor.
- Newt Gingrich – Former Speaker of the United States House of Representatives.
- Rudy Giuliani – Former Mayor of New York City.
- Annette Gordon-Reed – Pulitzer Prize-winning American historian and law professor.
- Tim Gunn – Creative director of Liz Claiborne and former mentor on Project Runway.
- Sean Hannity – American radio/television host and political commentator.
- Rick Harrison – Co-owner of the Gold & Silver Pawn Shop.
- Caitlyn Jenner – American Olympic Gold Medalist and reality TV figure.
- Steven Berlin Johnson – American popular science author.
- David Kennedy – American historian.
- John Lasseter – American animator, former chief creative officer of Pixar and Walt Disney Animation Studios.
- John Legend – Recording artist, musician, and actor.
- Richard Machowicz – Former Navy SEAL, weapons expert, and host of Future Weapons.
- Bill Maher – Political commentator and comedian, and the host of Real Time.
- Joseph Marinaccio – American business magnate, founder and CEO of Slam Content.
- Barack Obama – The then-President of the United States of America (introduces the series).
- Soledad O'Brien – American journalist and CNN figure.
- I. M. Pei – Chinese-born American architect.
- David Petraeus – United States Army general and Former Director of the Central Intelligence Agency.
- Colin Powell – former Secretary of State and Chairman of the Joint Chiefs of Staff.
- Al Sharpton – Baptist minister and civil rights activist.
- Richard Slotkin – Olin Professor of English and American studies at Wesleyan University.
- Richard Norton Smith – American historian and author specializing in US presidents.
- Martha Stewart – Business magnate, media figure, author, and magazine publisher.
- Michael Strahan – Former NFL football player and later media personality.
- Meryl Streep – Academy Award-winning actress.
- Donald Trump – Real estate tycoon, media figure, and later President of the United States.
- Jimmy Wales – Co-founder of Wikipedia.
- Vera Wang – American fashion designer.
- Brian Williams – Former anchor and managing editor of NBC Nightly News.

== Reception ==
The documentary received a 60% approval rating from Metacritic.com. Many criticized the series for having too many "celebrities" express their opinions about the United States, rather than having historians provide more insight and data about particular periods and events.

Critics praised the series' willingness to grapple with some of the difficult issues in US history, including African slavery, racial segregation and the genocide of the Native Americans. Mary McNamara, of the Los Angeles Times, wrote that "'America: The Story of Us' seems to draw its inspiration from Fox's '24' and the E! Channel." She continues, "[I]n the first hour, producer Jane Root seems more enamored of her ability to conjure, in glorious CG, the lifecycle of a tobacco plant or the brick-by-brick construction of New Amsterdam than anything so dull as explaining the complexities of actual history."

Critics generally commented that CGI effects were overused, as were clichéd soundbites and hyperbole that seemed intended to move the narrative along. Tom Shales of The Washington Post found seven repetitions of the notion that "What happened next would change the course of US history forever" within the first episode, and remarked: "Maybe everything that happens changes the course of something. Or maybe nothing that happens changes the course of anything. Simply saying 'everything changed forever' is really a substitute for thinking, not an example of it, but then 'America: The Story of Us' is basically a poor excuse for a documentary—even if it succeeds on the superficial level of, say, a lava lamp."

Surpassed by the series The Bible, which garnered over 13 million viewers of its first episode, America: The Story of US was watched by 5.7 million total viewers for its first episode and drew a 4.0 household rating. In conjunction with the broadcast, the History channel launched its largest educational outreach initiative, offering a series DVD to every school and accredited college in the United States.

America: The Story of Us has been nominated for four Emmy Awards for the episode "Division", which traced the growing tensions between the North and South, as well as contrasts between plantation and urban economies. The nominations were in the categories for non-fiction programming of "Outstanding Cinematography", "Outstanding Picture Editing ", "Outstanding Sound Editing" and "Outstanding Writing".

== International edition ==
An Australian series based on the American series, titled Australia: The Story of Us, aired from February 25, 2015 on the Seven Network.

A 10-episode Canadian series entitled Canada: The Story of Us, aired from March–May 2017 on the CBC.
