= Welcome to Earth (TV program) =

American television program

- Genre: Docuseries
- Presented by: Will Smith
- Country of origin: United States
- Original language: English
- No. of seasons: 1
- No. of episodes: 6

Production
- Executive producers: Ari Handel; Darren Aronofsky; Jane Root
- Production locations: United Kingdom; United States
- Production companies: Nutopia; Westbrook Studios; Protozoa Pictures

Original release
- Network: Disney+
- Release: 8 December 2021

Welcome to Earth is a television series that follows actor Will Smith, as he sets out to offer an insight into some of the world's most remote and uncharted locations. The program debuted as a Disney+ Original on 8 December 2021, under the National Geographic banner, with all six episodes airing at once. The title is a reference to a line of dialog spoken by Smith as the character, Captain Steven Hiller, in the film Independence Day.

== Premise ==
Will Smith is guided by experienced National Geographic Explorers, traveling to places such as remote islands in the Pacific, to the Namib Desert.

== Production ==
After filming One Strange Rock, National Geographic suggested Will Smith to become the narrator of a new television program. Welcome to Earth was filmed during the COVID-19 pandemic. The program was produced for Disney+ by Nutopia, Westbrook Studios and Protozoa Pictures.

== Episodes ==
No.	Title	Original release date
1	"The Silent Roar"	8 December 2021
2	"Descent Into Darkness"	8 December 2021
3	"Mind of the Swarm"	8 December 2021
4	"Power of Scent"	8 December 2021
5	"Speed of Life"	8 December 2021
6	"Beyond Fear"	8 December 2021

== Release ==
The program premiered on Disney+ on 8 December 2021.

== Reception ==
=== Critical response ===
On the review aggregator Rotten Tomatoes, the first season of the program holds an approval rating of 100%, based on 9 reviews, with an average rating of 7.00/10. Metacritic, which uses a weighted average, assigned the film a score of 63 out of 100 based on 50 critics, indicating "generally favorable reviews".

=== Accolades ===
Year	Award	Category	Nominee(s)	Result	Ref.
2021	LifeArt Festival	Festival Selection	Welcome to Earth	Won	
2022	Golden Reel Awards	Outstanding Achievement in Sound Editing - Non-Theatrical Documentary	Jay Price, Rob Price, Tom Foster, Stuart Bagshaw, Ruth Sullivan, Ben Smithers	Nominated	
