= Farsighted (book) =

2018 nonfiction book by Steven Johnson

Farsighted: How We Make the Decisions That Matter the Most
- Author: Steven Berlin Johnson
- Language: English
- Subject: Decision-making, Cultural studies
- Publisher: Riverhead
- Publication date: September 2018
- Pages: 244
- ISBN: 978-1-59448-821-4
- LC Class: BF448 .J64 2018

Farsighted: How We Make the Decisions That Matter the Most (2018) is a nonfiction book by American journalist Steven Johnson.

== Key concepts ==
Johnson uses a case-study approach to explore the deliberate, "full-spectrum" analysis process used by successful decision-makers. Examples range widely, from the 2011 raid that killed Osama bin Laden to the destruction of Manhattan's Collect Pond, and even include the literary depiction of decision-making under uncertainty in George Eliot's Middlemarch. Johnson mines these examples for decision-making tools: "We don't have an infallible algorithm for making wise choices, but we do have a meaningful body of techniques that can keep us from making stupid ones. "

In Johnson's view, "the craft of making farsighted choices — decisions that require long periods of deliberation, decisions whose consequences might last for years, if not centuries, as in the case of Collect Pond — is a strangely underappreciated skill." A tendency to concentrate on the specific elements of a decision may obscure the process by which "hard decisions" are made, a slow process that is very different from the "flash judgments and gut impressions profiled in books like Blink and How We Decide," which rely on the automatic "System 1" brain described in Daniel Kahneman's Thinking, Fast and Slow.

Johnson advances the idea that skilled, forward-looking decision-makers use a process comprising separate mapping, predicting (including forecasting and simulating), and deciding steps. Decisions involve distinct divergence and consensus phases. "In a divergence phase, the key objective is to get as many perspectives and variables on the table as possible through exploratory exercises designed to reveal new possibilities.... sometimes those possibilities take the form of an entirely new path that you didn't contemplate at the beginning of the process. In the consensus phase, the open-ended exploration of new possibilities reverses course, and the group begins to narrow down its options, seeking agreement on the correct path. Each phase requires a distinct set of cognitive tools and collaborative models to succeed."

=== Mapping ===
The first step in confronting a hard choice is to make a map "to describe the literal and figurative terrain around you: taking inventory of all the forces at play; sketching out all the regions that are visible, and at least acknowledging the blind spots; charting the potential paths you can take in navigating the space." The goal is "a set of potential paths, given the variables at play in the overall system.... mapping is the point in the decision process where divergence and diversity are key. You are not looking for consensus in this phase; you are looking to expand the range of possible factors (and, ultimately, decision paths). The challenge of mapping is getting outside our intuitive sense of the situation in front of us. Our minds naturally gravitate to narrowband interpretations, compressing the full spectrum down into one dominant slice." Farsighted decision-makers do not force the map "to match some existing template," but instead develop "the kind of keen vision required to see the situation as it truly is."

=== Predicting ===
Making hard choices implicitly entails "making predictions about the course of future events," but successful decisions require "a better-than-chance understanding of where the paths you're choosing between are going to take you. You can't be farsighted if the road ahead is blurry." Hill's randomized controlled trial concept is offered as an example of a tool that meaningfully increased the accuracy of predicting the future behavior of complex systems.

Ensemble simulations, war games, scenario planning, red teams, and Gary Klein's "premortem" procedure serve to incorporate and localize uncertainty, helping decision-makers avoid a "range of cognitive habits — from the fallacy of extrapolation to overconfidence to confirmation bias – [that] tends to blind us to the potential pitfalls of a decision once we have committed to it." Several of these tools were used to reduce and define uncertainties encountered in planning the US raid on Abbottabad.

=== Deciding ===
The process of making a final decision, a process that may be more art than science, can be clarified by "keeping score." Johnson compares scenario scoring techniques based on either maximizing value or minimizing harm. The latter, formulated as a probabilistic assessment of risks, confers long-term advantage in forcing the consideration of "not just our objectives and values, but also something we can be too quick to dismiss: the highly unlikely catastrophe."

As reviews of this book have noted, Johnson does not prescribe a particular approach but counsels the decision-maker to take time to mull over options and select paths that can be modified later. "Hard choices demand that we train the mind to override the snap judgments of System 1 thinking, that we keep our mind open to new possibilities — starting with the possibility that our instinctive response to a situation is quite likely the wrong one."

Subsequent chapters entitled "The Global Choice" and "The Personal Choice" explore the ramifications of decisions affecting many or a few people, and the important role of imagination in each.

== Critical reception ==
Reviews of Farsighted are generally positive, emphasizing Johnson's expertise in writing about the history of ideas and praising its use of apt examples. The New York Times called it an "idea book," a "riveting" analysis of how skilled long-term thinkers approach decisions that, unlike a typical business book, does not prescribe "easy formulas" for how one would make decisions about "the grand moments that shape our futures." A Financial Times review praises Johnson's suitability to address this topic, gracefully served examples, and its "positive" approach. The Wall Street Journal said the book "lose(s) steam" in a consideration of decision-making at a global scale, illustrated with the issue of climate change, but its final chapter, regarding a momentous personal decision, seems to be "from the heart."

== See also ==
- Decision-making
