= Peepshow Collective =

Group of visual artists based in Brighton, England

Peepshow
- Industry: Animation, illustration, art direction
- Founded: London (2000)
- Website: www.peepshow.org.uk

Peepshow Collective is a group of visual artists founded in 2000, most of whom are graduates of Brighton University, England.

== History ==
Peepshow was initially composed of graduates from the 1998 BA (Hons) Illustration course at the University of Brighton. It was founded in 2000 after working as part of the design team that created the 4,000 sq ft (370 m2) 'Hi-Life' supermarket installation for EXPO 2000 under the direction of UK writer and collage artist Graham Rawle. Since then, as a collective and as individuals, they have worked extensively within the areas of illustration, animation, art direction, motion design, set design, mixed media installation and fashion/textile design.

They fostered relationships with The Victoria and Albert Museum, SHOWstudio and onedotzero as well as many international advertising agencies such as Fallon, Ogilvy and Mather, M&C Saatchi, Wieden + Kennedy and TBWA. Much of the creative input for their commercial work stems from self-initiated activities, events and exhibitions. They were included in the British Council touring expo 'Picture This' and 'Ecology Earth' at the National Museum of Modern Art, Tokyo.

As illustrators they have frequently appeared in publications such as The Guardian, The Observer, The Daily Telegraph and The New York Times and their work regularly features in Creative Review, Design Week and Varoom. They have been asked to contribute to many books on the subject of illustration including 'Pen & Mouse' & 'Hand To Eye' by Angus Hyland and '50 Years of Illustration' & 'The Fundamentals of Illustration' by Lawrence Zeegen. Collectively Peepshow's moving image work has been featured at 'onedotzero: adventures in motion' at the ICA, 'Counter:Vision' at The Hayward Gallery and as part of 'Pictoplasma' in New York as well as appearing on channels such as the BBC, Channel 4 and MTV. In 2012 they published a book Peepshow Collective, showcasing the output of the collective since its formation and were artist-in-residence at Somerset House for Pick Me Up with the installation 'The Museum of Objects & Origins'

Since 2014 they have worked extensively on motion design projects from their studio in Shoreditch creating titles, graphics and animation for broadcasters including Amazon Prime, Apple TV+, BBC, CNN, HBO, National Geographic Channel and PBS.

In 2015 they won Outstanding Motion Design at the 67th Emmy Awards for their work on PBS TV Series How We Got To Now.

In 2019 they were awarded the Professional Excellence, Craft Award for Graphics and Titling at The Royal Television Society Scotland Awards. Peepshow's work on National Geographic Channel's ‘Inside North Korea’s Dynasty’ was awarded ‘Outstanding Graphic Design & Art Direction’ at the 40th News & Documentary Emmy Awards.

In 2021 Peepshow created the graphics and visual design for the BBC One and Apple TV+ documentary 9/11: Inside the President's War Room for which they won the 'Design - Programme Content Sequences' category at the 2021 RTS Craft and Design Awards.

In 2022 they created the titles & graphics for the BBC documentary Elizabeth: The Unseen Queen.

In 2024 they created the graphics and visual design for the BBC documentary '7/7: The London Bombings'.

== Key personnel ==
The members of Peepshow since its inception include: Luke Best, Jenny Bowers, Graham Carter, Miles Donovan, Chrissie MacDonald, Pete Mellor, Marie O'Connor, Andrew Rae, Elliot Thoburn, Lucy Vigrass and Spencer Wilson.

== Exhibitions and installations ==
- Peepshow, New Inn Yard Gallery, Shoreditch, London, 2001
- Peep(box)show, Various, London, 2002
- Perverted Science, Dreambagsjaguarshoes, Shoreditch, London, 2003
- 930sq ft of Peepshow, 17, Shoreditch, London, 2005
- From Start to Finish, Saatchi & Saatchi, London, 2007
- Peepshow's Antarctic Expedition, DDB, London, 2007
- Many Hands Make More Work, Concrete Hermit, Shoreditch, London, 2007
- Ecology Earth 21, Museum of Modern Art, Saitama, Japan, 2008
- In Between, Dreamspace Gallery, London, 2009
- Pick Me Up, Somerset House, London, 2010
- Museum of Objects & Origins at Pick Me Up, Somerset House, London, 2012

== Broadcast projects ==
- The Grand Tour, Amazon Prime, 2026
- Secrets of the Bayeux Tapestry: Inside the Museum, BBC, 2026
- Meet the Owens, Amazon Prime, 2026
- World Wide Mafia: 'Ndrangheta, Disney+, 2026
- Click To Kill: The Ai War Machine, Channel 4, 2026
- Chernobyl: Inside The Meltdown, National Geographic, 2026
- Fred & Rose West: A British Horror Story, Netflix, 2025
- 7/7: The London Bombings, BBC, 2025
- Secrets & Spies: A Nuclear Game, BBC, 2024
- Julius Caesar: The Making of a Dictator, BBC, 2023
- Charles R: The Making of a Monarch, BBC, 2023
- The Secret Genius of Modern Life, BBC, 2023-2025
- SAS Rogue Heroes, BBC, 2022-2025
- Elizabeth: The Unseen Queen, BBC, 2022
- Lucy Worsley Investigates, BBC/PBS, 2022
- Four Hours at the Capitol, BBC/HBO, 2021
- 9/11: Inside The President's War Room, BBC/Apple TV+, 2021
- Clarkson's Farm, Amazon Prime, 2021-2026
- Race For The Vaccine, BBC/CNN, 2021
- Being Bridget Jones, BBC, 2020
- The Rise of The Murdoch Dynasty, BBC, 2020
- Rise of The Nazis, BBC, 2019
- ICONS, BBC, 2019
- Catching Britain's Killers: The Crimes That Changed Us, BBC, 2019
- The Yorkshire Ripper Files: A Very British Crime Story, BBC, 2019
- The Flu That Killed 50 Million, BBC, 2018
- Inside North Korea's Dynasty, National Geographic Channel, 2018
- Angela Carter: Of Wolves and Women, BBC, 2018
- Elizabeth's Secret Agents, BBC, 2016
- Map of Hell, National Geographic Channel, 2016
- How We Got To Now with Steven Johnson, BBC/PBS, 2014
