= Emergence: The Connected Lives of Ants, Brains, Cities, and Software =

Book by Steven Berlin Johnson

Emergence: The Connected Lives of Ants, Brains, Cities and Software
- Authors: Steven Berlin Johnson
- Language: English
- Genre: non-fiction
- Publisher: Scribner
- Publication date: 2001
- Pages: 288
- ISBN: 9780684868752
- OCLC: 46858386

Emergence: The Connected Lives of Ants, Brains, Cities, and Software is a book written by media theorist Steven Berlin Johnson, published in 2001. Early review drafts had the subtitle “What the New Science Can Teach Us About Our Minds, Our Communities, and Ourselves” instead of the “Connected lives…”

== Quote ==
“The whole is sometimes smarter than the sum of its parts.”

== Achievements ==
- The New York Times — Notable book
- Voice Literary Supplement – Top25 books of the year
- Esquire Magazine – Best book of the year
