= Primetime Emmy Award for Outstanding Motion Design =

Television award category

- Awarded for: Outstanding Motion Design
- Country: United States
- Presented by: Academy of Television Arts & Sciences
- Currently held by: Octopus! (2025)
- Website: emmys.com

The Primetime Emmy Award for Outstanding Motion Design is an annual award given to recognize the best motion design work of the year. The award was introduced as a Primetime Emmy category at the 67th Primetime Creative Arts Emmy Awards in 2015. Winners are selected by a jury.

== Winners ==
=== 2010s ===
2010s
Year	Program	Recipients	Network
2015 (67th)	How We Got to Now with Steven Johnson	Miles Presland Donovan, creative producer; Luke Best, art director/illustrator; Peter Mellor, animation director; Chris Sayer, animator	PBS
2016 (68th)	—N/a	—N/a	—N/a
2017 (69th)	13th	Angus Wall and Leanne Dare, co-creative directors; Lynn Cho, designer; Dan Meehan and Ekin Akalin, animators	Netflix
2017 (69th)	Beyond Magic	Orion Tait, executive creative director; Thomas Schmid and Daniel Oeffinger, creative directors; William Trebutien, lead animator	ABC
2018 (70th)	Broad City	Mike Perry, animation director; Isam Prado, supervising animator; Eric Perez, Maya Edelman, and Barbara Benas, animators	Comedy Central
2018 (70th)	Wasted! The Story of Food Waste	Mike Houston, design and graphics director; Daniel de Graaf, as art director; Naoko Saito, Ryan Frost, and Chris King, motion graphics and visual effects artists	Starz
2019 (71st)	Patriot Act with Hasan Minhaj	Michelle Higa Fox and Jorge L. Peschiera, creative directors; Yussef Cole, head of animation; Brandon Sugiyama and Paris London Glickman, lead animators	Netflix

=== 2020s ===
2020s
Year	Program	Recipients	Network
2020 (72nd)	Inside Bill's Brain: Decoding Bill Gates	Leanne Dare, creative director; Eben McCue, Sebastian Hoppe-Fuentes, and David Navas, animators	Netflix
2021 (73rd)	Calls	Alexei Tylevich, creative director; Ethan Stickley, designer/animator; Scott Ulrich, Daisuke Goto, and Chi Hong, animators; James Connelly, editor	Apple TV+
2022 (74th)	Home Before Dark	Jon Berkowitz and Brad Colwell, creative directors; Kimberly Tang, associate creative director; Nolan Borkenhagen, art director	Apple TV+
2023 (75th)	Ms. Marvel	Ian Spendloff, director; David Lochhead, Daniella Marsh and David Stumpf, designers; Philip Robinson and Matthew Thomas, 3D artists	Disney+
2024 (76th)	Jim Henson Idea Man	Mark Thompson, Seamus Walsh and Mark Caballero, creative directors; Ivan Viaranchyk and Max Strizich, designers; Momo Zhao, animator	Disney+
2025 (77th)	Octopus!	Minkyung Chung, designer; Michaela Olsen, creative director; Hayley Morris and Julie Gratz, art directors; Anthony Galante, cinematographer; Sabrina Chaney, compositor	Prime Video
2026 (78th)	—N/a	—N/a	—N/a
