= Abhin Galeya =

British stage and screen actor

- Other name: Abhin Shah
- Education: Webber Douglas Academy of Dramatic Art
- Occupation: Actor
- Years active: 2001–present

Abhin Shah or Abhin Galeya is a British actor. He is best known for his roles as PC Arun Ghir in the ITV series The Bill from 2008 to 2009, Ash in the 2012 film Cleanskin, and Salman Paak in Star Wars: Andor (2022).

== Early life and education ==
Galeya grew up in Edgware. He trained at the Webber Douglas Academy of Dramatic Art.

== Career ==
During his time at Webber, Galeya landed an ensemble role in The Ramayana Role at the Royal National Theatre in 2001 and had a couple of guest television roles. Galeya played Jay in the 2002 BBC Wales miniseries First Degree and made his film debut in the 2004 romantic comedy Wimbledon. He had a recurring role as DC Simon Tait in the second series of the ITV series Murder Investigation Team.

After appearing in a 2004 episode of The Bill, Galeya returned to play Police Constable Arun Ghir from 2008 to 2009. He appeared in the indie film The Blue Tower which went on to win the Best UK Feature award at the 2008 Raindance Film Festival. In addition, he appeared in Ronan Bennett's "Blowback", part of the BBC Two anthology on the Iraq War 10 Days to War.

In 2009, Galeya had stage roles as in the three-day Not Black and White anthology at the Tricycle Theatre and Jemal in The Container at the Young Vic.

Galeya starred as Ash in the 2012 terrorist thriller film Cleanskin alongside Sean Bean, Charlotte Rampling, James Fox, Michelle Ryan and Tuppence Middleton. Despite mixed reviews for the film as overall, Galeya received critical acclaim for his performance, with Variety calling him "consistently impressive" and Screen International attributing "the gravitas" to him and Bean.

Galeya had roles in two Christianity-related programmes as John the Baptist in the 2015 television film Killing Jesus on National Geographic and Judas in the 2017 series Jesus: His Life on the History Channel.

He went on the 2017 stage tour of Hedda Gabler. In 2019, he starred in the West End and Old Vic revival of The American Clock.

Galeya has roles in the 2020 Finnish series Peacemaker and the 2021 Norwegian series Bortført. He played Archbishop Thomas Cranmer in the Channel 5 three-part thriller drama Anne Boleyn.

== Filmography ==
=== Film ===
Year	Title	Role	Notes
2004	Wimbledon	Vijay	
2008	The Blue Tower	Mohan	
2009	Living with the Infidels	Ali	
2012	Cleanskin	Ash	
2012	Broken Eternity	Man	Short film
2014	Film: The Movie	Josh Sawyer	
2014	Exodus: Gods and Kings	Soldier	
2017	Let Me Go	Chris	
2018	Process	Varun	Short film

=== Television ===
Year	Title	Role	Notes
2001	Down to Earth	Steve	Episode: "Rites and Wrongs"
2001	Judge John Deed	Young Jury Man	Episode: "Duty of Care"
2002	First Degree	Jay	Miniseries
2003	Final Demand	Bashir	Television film
2004; 2008–2009	The Bill	PC Arun Ghir / Dalbeer Singh	25 episodes
2004	The Inspector Lynley Mysteries	Satnam Gualti	Episode: "If Wishes Were Horses"
2004	Casualty	Ajay Singh	Episode: "Little White Lies"
2005; 2007	Doctors	Amar Jindal / Matt Whitehead	2 episodes
2005	Murder Investigation Team	DC Simon Tait	4 episodes (series 2)
2005	Waking the Dead	Harry	2 episodes
2005	Rome	Oedipus	Episode: "Triumph"
2006	Totally Frank	Ash	1 episode
2006	Bad Girls	Pete	1 episode
2007	Holby City	Vikram Popat	Episode: "The Last Throw"
2007	Robin Hood	Nasir	Episode: "We Are Robin Hood"
2008	10 Days to War	Mamoon	Episode: "Blowback"
2012	Hustle	Wasam Madani	Episode: " The Con Is Off"
2012	White Heat	Saghoor	Episode: "The Eye of the Needle"
2013	Fresh Meat	Hasan	1 episode
2015	Father Brown	Doctor Raj Chandraty	Episode: "The Last Man"
2015	Silent Witness	Daniel Doshi	2 episodes
2015	Killing Jesus	John the Baptist	Television film
2015	The Royals	Omar	Episode: "The Slings and Arrows of Outrageous Fortune"
2019	Jesus: His Life	Judas	
2020	Peacemaker (Finnish: Rauhantekijä)	Zamen Essayah	
2021	The Girl from Oslo (Danish: Bortført)	Abu Salim	
2021	Anne Boleyn	Thomas Cranmer	Miniseries
2022	Star Wars: Andor	Salman Paak	5 episodes
2023	Maternal	Raz Farooqi	ITV drama
2024	Say Nothing	Dr. Mansuri	Episode: "Do No Harm"
2026	House of the Dragon	Leo	Episode: "Tumbleton"
TBA	Saviour	Dev Sangar	

=== Video games ===
Year	Title	Role	Notes
2017	Assassin's Creed Origins	Additional voices	
2020	Amnesia: Rebirth	Salim Hannachi / Malick Tamboura	

== Stage ==
Year	Title	Role	Notes
2001	The Ramayana Role	Ensemble	Tricycle Theatre, London
2003	East is East	Saleem	New Vic Theatre, Newcastle-under-Lyme
2007	The Hot Zone	Waris Islam	Battersea Arts Centre, London
2009	Not Black and White: Detaining Justice, Seize the Day, Category B	Ben / Ravinder / Riz	Tricycle Theatre, London
2009	The Container	Jemal	Young Vic, London
2016	The Hotel Cerise	Karim Hassan	Theatre Royal Stratford East
2017	The Lower Depths	Kleesht	Arcola Theatre, London
2017	The Cherry Orchard	Trofimov	Arcola Theatre, London
2017	Hedda Gabler	Tesman	UK tour
2018	Big Aftermath of a Small Disclosure	Jon	Summerhall, Edinburgh Fringe Festival
2019	The American Clock	Tony / Moe 2	Old Vic, London
