= Steven Johnson (author) =

American popular science author and media theorist

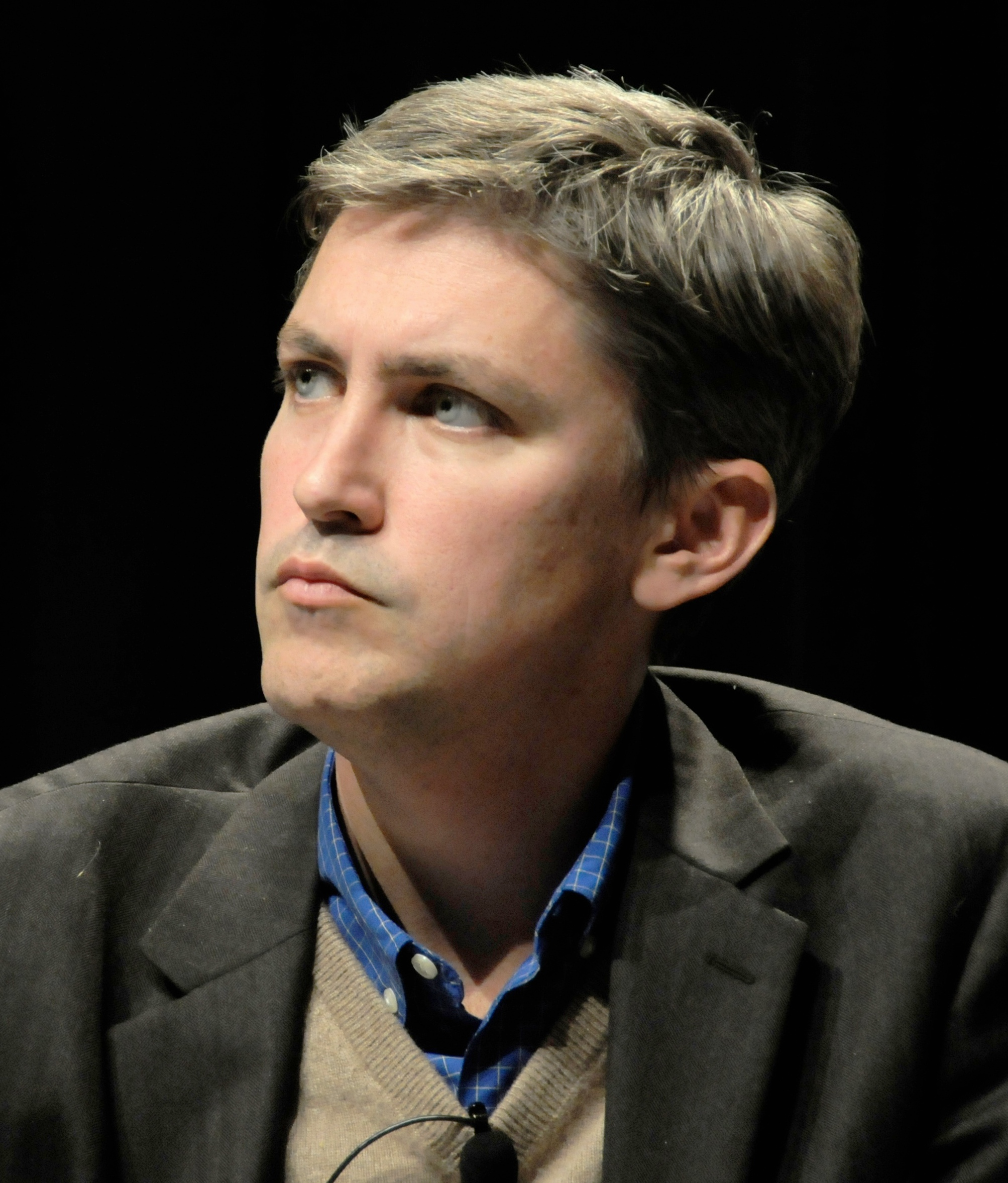
- Johnson at South by Southwest in 2008
- Born: Steven Berlin Johnson; June 6, 1968 (age 58); Washington, D.C., U.S.
- Education: Brown University (BA); Columbia University (MA)
- Occupations: Author, TV presenter
- Spouse: Alexa Robinson
- Children: 3
- Website: www.stevenberlinjohnson.com

Steven Berlin Johnson (born June 6, 1968) is an American popular science and history author, TV and podcast host, and software creator.

== Education ==
Steven grew up in Washington, D.C., where he attended St. Albans School. He completed his undergraduate degree at Brown University, where he studied semiotics, a part of the school's modern culture and media department. He also has a graduate degree from Columbia University in English literature.

== Career ==
Johnson is the author of thirteen books, largely on the intersection of science, technology, and personal experience. He has also co-created three influential web sites: the pioneering online magazine FEED, the Webby Award-winning community site, Plastic.com, and the hyperlocal media site outside.in. A contributing editor to Wired, he writes regularly for The New York Times, The Wall Street Journal, The Financial Times, and many other periodicals. Johnson also serves on the advisory boards of a number of Internet-related companies, including Medium, Atavist, Meetup.com, Betaworks, and Patch.com. Johnson termed GoogleShare, a percentage measure of how closely two topics are related to each other based on Google Search results, in 2002.

He is the author of the best-selling book Everything Bad is Good for You: How Today's Popular Culture Is Actually Making Us Smarter (2005), which argues that over the last three decades popular culture artifacts such as television dramas and video games have become increasingly complex and have helped to foster higher-order thinking skills.

His book Where Good Ideas Come From advances a notion to challenge the popular story of a lone genius experiencing an instantaneous moment of inspiration. Johnson instead argues that innovative thinking is a slow, gradual, and very networked process in which "slow hunches" are cultivated, and completed, by exposure to seemingly unrelated ideas and quandaries from other disciplines and thinkers. He lists the themes he has identified from studying which environments and conditions have been correlated, historically, with high innovation. He argues that they make theoretical sense because of their tendency to effectively explore the "adjacent possible", Stuart Kauffman's concept (which Johnson cites) of the space of innovations waiting to be made from combining immediately-available notions and solutions.

His book Future Perfect: The Case for Progress in a Networked Age was released in September 2012.

In August 2013, PBS announced that Johnson would be the host and co-creator of a new six-part series on the history of innovation, How We Got to Now, scheduled to air on PBS and BBC Two in Fall 2014.

Since May 2018, Johnson has hosted the podcast American Innovations, created by Wondery.

Johnson is a co-host (with David Olusoga) of the PBS/Nutopia 4-part series Extra Life: A Short History of Living Longer, that premiered on Tuesday, May 11, 2021. Respective hour-long episodes include "Vaccines", "Data", "Medicine", and "Behavior".

Since the summer of 2022, Johnson has worked at Google as part of the Google Labs team. He works on the NotebookLM product, an experimental note-taking, research, and audio tool backed by artificial intelligence.

== Reception ==
=== Critical reception ===
In 1997, Harvey Blume reviewed Johnson's first book, Interface Culture, and called it "a rewarding read—stimulating, iconoclastic, and strikingly original."

The A.V. Club said in a review of Everything Bad Is Good for You: How Today's Popular Culture Is Actually Making Us Smarter, "It's a good argument made in great detail, mapped out with lists and charts of decision-affecting contingencies and intricate narrative structures. But how necessary it is remains debatable, especially once Everything Bad settles into simply restating its already convincing premise."

David Quammen reviewed The Ghost Map (2006) for The New York Times, writing, "There's a great story here, one of the signal episodes in the history of medical science, and Johnson recounts it well... His book is a formidable gathering of small facts and big ideas, and the narrative portions are particularly strong, informed by real empathy for both his named and his nameless characters, flawed only sporadically by portentousness and small stylistic lapses." He called the book, and Johnson, "intriguing" and "smart".

Entertainment Weekly gave The Ghost Map an 'A' rating, saying, "The Ghost Map asks the reader to imagine a situation in which 'you could leave town for a weekend and come back to find 10 percent of your neighbors being wheeled down the street in death carts.' For inhabitants of mid-19th-century London, cholera rendered this apocalyptic vision a terrifying reality... Johnson traces the courageous and ultimately successful attempt by an anesthetist/scientist/sleuth named John Snow to discover how the disease was transmitted. And he does so in a way that brings to nightmarish, thought-provoking life a world in which a swift but very unpleasant death can be just a glass of water away."

Author Alex Soojung-Kim Pang, in The Los Angeles Times, called 2010's Where Good Ideas Come From "a vision of innovation and ideas that is resolutely social, dynamic and material" and "fluidly written, entertaining and smart without being arcane",—"a Renaissance alchemical guide". Bruce Ramsey described in The Seattle Times how, in Where Good Ideas Come From, "Johnson is looking for the new ideas in our civilization and seeking to explain why they arise where they do."

Kirkus Reviews called Good Ideas a "robust volume that brings new perspective to an old subject" and said of Johnson, "Throughout, his infectious enthusiasm and unyielding insight inspire and entertain." The Sunday Telegraph said, "Like all good ideas, this book is bigger than the sum of its parts... Johnson enlivens his argument with stories and examples that bring personality and depth to his ideas, and make for an engaging read..."

Oliver Burkeman, in a review of Future Perfect, described the book as "a wide-ranging sketch of possibilities, not a detailed policy prescription, and read as such, it's frequently inspiring. Above all, it's exciting to reflect on the possibility that the many achievements of the Silicon Valley revolution might be compatible, rather than in tension, with a progressive focus on social justice and participatory democracy."

Ethan Gilsdorf, also reviewing Future Perfect, called it "a buoyant and hopeful book" with "clear and engaging prose".

=== Awards and honors ===
Johnson's book Emergence: The Connected Lives of Ants, Brains, Cities, and Software was a finalist for the 2002 Helen Bernstein Book Award for Excellence in Journalism.

His Where Good Ideas Come From was a finalist for the 800CEORead award for best business book of 2010, and was ranked as one of the year's best books by The Economist. His book The Ghost Map was one of the ten best nonfiction books of 2006 according to Entertainment Weekly, and was runner up for the National Academies Communication Award in 2006. His books have been translated into more than a dozen languages.

He was the 2009 Hearst new media professional-in-residence at Columbia Journalism School, and served for several years as a distinguished writer in residence at New York University's Journalism School. He won a Newhouse School Mirror Award for his 2009 TIME magazine cover article "How Twitter Will Change the Way We Live". He has appeared on television programs such as The Colbert Report, The Charlie Rose Show, The Daily Show with Jon Stewart, and The NewsHour with Jim Lehrer.

== Personal life ==
After growing up in Washington, D.C., and graduating from St. Albans School in 1986, Johnson moved to New York City in 1990 and spent twenty-one years there, living in Morningside Heights, Manhattan, for seven years, then the West Village, where his first son was born. Johnson writes that, on September 11, 2001, he and his wife "watched the Twin Towers fall from Greenwich Street on our son's first day home from the hospital. When our second son was on the way, we decamped for Brooklyn..."

In 2010, interviewer Oliver Burkeman wrote that "Johnson, who lives with his wife Alexa Robinson and their three sons in Brooklyn... gives around 50 lectures a year, and writes plenty of high-profile opinion columns, all of which he has accomplished by the not-exactly-ancient age of 42. (While we're on the topic, he also has an enormous 1.4 million followers on Twitter...)"

In a 2011 blog, he wrote that he and his family would be leaving New York "for a few years" as they would be "moving to Marin County, on the north side of the Golden Gate Bridge across the bay from San Francisco"—"a two-year move: an adventure, not a life-changer".

Johnson talks about a near-death experience in his 2004 book Mind Wide Open. He and his wife lived in "an apartment in a renovated old warehouse on the far west edge of downtown Manhattan", a home with "a massive eight-foot-high window looking out over the Hudson River" where they often enjoyed the view. On a June afternoon, they watched "an especially severe storm" approaching. Within minutes, the storm smashed the window, of which they were not directly in front during the crisis.

He has written that he has some difficulty with visual encoding, "a trait that I seem to share with Aldous Huxley", whom Johnson quotes at greater length in Mind Wide Open than cited here: "I am and, for as long as I can remember, I have always been a poor visualizer. Words, even the pregnant words of poets, do not evoke pictures in my mind. No hypnagogic visions greet me on the verge of sleep. When I recall something, the memory does not present itself to me as a vividly seen event or object. By an effort of the will, I can evoke a not very vivid image of what happened yesterday afternoon..."

== Books ==
Title	Year	ISBN	Subject matter
Interface Culture: How New Technology Transforms the Way We Create and Communicate	1997	978-0-06-251482-0	
Emergence: The Connected Lives of Ants, Brains, Cities, and Software	2001	978-0-684-86875-2	Emergence
Mind Wide Open: Your Brain and the Neuroscience of Everyday Life	2004	978-0-7432-4165-6	Cognitive neuroscience
Everything Bad Is Good for You: How Today's Popular Culture Is Actually Making Us Smarter	2005	978-1-57322-307-2	Popular culture; Video games
The Ghost Map: The Story of London's Most Terrifying Epidemic—and How it Changed Science, Cities and the Modern World	2006	978-1-59448-925-9	1854 Broad Street cholera outbreak; John Snow
The Invention of Air: A Story of Science, Faith, Revolution, and the Birth of America	2008	978-1-59448-852-8	Joseph Priestley
Where Good Ideas Come From: The Natural History of Innovation	2010	978-1-59448-771-2	Innovation
Future Perfect: The Case for Progress in a Networked Age	2012	978-1-59448-820-7	"Peer progressives"
How We Got to Now: Six Innovations That Made the Modern World	2014	978-1-59463-296-9	
Wonderland: How Play Made the Modern World	2016	978-1-5098-3729-8	"Johnson's play is a combination of novelty, leisure, and pleasure"
Farsighted: How We Make the Decisions That Matter the Most	2018	978-0-73521-160-5	Decision-making
Enemy of All Mankind: A true story of piracy, power, and history's first global manhunt	2020	978-1-59448-821-4	Henry Every
Extra Life: A Short History of Living Longer	2021	978-0-52553-885-1	Life expectancy
The Infernal Machine: A True Story of Dynamite, Terror, and the Rise of the Modern Detective	2024	978-0-59344-395-8	Anarchist vs NYPD in the early 20th century

== See also ==
- List of notable English-language science popularizers
