= Canada: The Story of Us =

Canadian historical television series

- Narrated by: Sylvie Pamphile
- Country of origin: Canada
- No. of episodes: 10

Production
- Running time: 60 min.
- Production company: Bristow Global Media

Original release
- Network: CBC Television
- Release: March 26 – May 14, 2017

Related
- America: The Story of Us; Australia: The Story of Us; Mankind: The Story of All of Us

Canada: The Story of Us is a Canadian historical docudrama television series, which aired on CBC Television in 2017. Produced by Bristow Global Media, the 10-part series focuses on several significant periods in Canadian history, using dramatic reenactments to depict key moments and featuring commentary from Canadian public and entertainment figures. It is similar to other docudramas produced by Nutopia for the U.S. and Australia.

The series featured an introduction by Prime Minister Justin Trudeau.

== Episodes ==
No.	Title	Original release date
1	"Worlds Collide (pre-1608 – 1759)"	March 26, 2017
Hundreds of Indigenous nations with advanced cultures already live in Canada when French and English colonizers arrive and fight for land claims. Indigenous people suffer as a result of first contact.
2	"Hunting Treasure (1777 - 1793)"	April 10, 2017
A new generation of rebels and entrepreneurs compete for the key to this land's prosperity – its natural resources – while others fight to protect them. It's an epic quest for treasure that shapes the country to this day.
3	"War of Independence (1812 - 1813)"	April 23, 2017
The War of 1812 is Canada's War of Independence. With the British Empire entrenched in a European war, a disparate group of Indigenous, French Canadian, Scottish, African Canadian and even ex-pat American fighters join together to fight for their new homeland.
4	"Connected (1824 - 1890)"	April 23, 2017
Inventors and entrepreneurs dream of uniting the country using the latest design and technology – and make their fortunes in the process. An extraordinary generation will revolutionize transportation, engineering and communications, making Canada the high-tech superstar of a newly-wired world.
5	"Expansion (1858 - 1899)"	April 26, 2017
In the lead up to Confederation, Canada faces the threat of American expansionism and a decreased interest by the British in maintaining the colony. Determined that Canada will remain independent and free, a generation of risk takers, gold miners, cowboys and railway builders will rise to the challenge. But not everyone is happy with this expansion.
6	"Service and Sacrifice (1916 - 1929)"	April 26, 2017
Bravery and sacrifice define our new nation as war erupts across Europe. Canada, as a British Dominion, joins in the fight – a young country seeking to find its place on the world stage. It's not long before nearly half a million Canadians, including thousands of Indigenous soldiers, travel to Europe to serve beside their allies in the First World War.
7	"Boom / Bust (1919 - 1937)"	May 9, 2017
It's the dawn of the 20th century and Canada's population is exploding. For many Canadians living in urban centres, this growth comes at cost. Deadly diseases plague cities. Labour strikes lead to violent conflict. Through boom times and bust, Canadians struggle to improve their lives and learn to care for others.
8	"United at War (1939 - 1944)"	April 2, 2017
WWII, a war even more terrible than the last, demands courage, commitment and ingenuity. Canada meets this challenge head on, giving everything we have at home and abroad. Canadians come together, working and fighting for a common cause. United – at war.
9	"New Identity (1946 - 1970)"	May 7, 2017
Canada experiences a boom time after the war, but not all are happy with the status quo. They seek to reshape the country and challenge dark legacies of injustice. The circle of Confederation grows and Canada emerges as a complex and cosmopolitan nation on the world stage.
10	"The Canadian Experiment (1976 - 1999)"	May 14, 2017
Canada seeks to navigate the complexities of its diverse population, keeping its borders open to those who have nowhere else to turn while trying to negotiate a new relationship with Indigenous peoples. This unique example of nationhood serves as an example for the world as Canada moves into the 21st century.

== Criticism ==
The program's first episode faced significant criticism, particularly for eliding First Nations and Acadian history in favour of treating the establishment of New France as the primary starting point to Canadian history. A number of politicians in Quebec also criticized the program's portrayal of New France as inaccurate, including the depiction of Samuel de Champlain as dirty and unkempt in a diplomatic meeting with the Wendat, even while James Wolfe was portrayed as clean in the middle of his physical climb up Cap Diamant. As well, the series was criticized for using primarily anglophone actors with poor French skills to portray the French Canadian settlers instead of selecting francophone actors.

The Globe and Mail journalist Konrad Yakabuski linked the program's critical response to the CBC's reliance on an outside production firm, due to the closure of its internal documentary production unit in 2015. He compared the series to the much more favourably received 2000 series Canada: A People's History, an internal production which was a collaboration between the CBC's English and French divisions and thus avoided the pitfalls around depiction of French Canadian history that marred The Story of Us. The Huffington Post blogger D. K. Latta noted that the program's primary narrative thrust appeared to be the history of Canadian business and entrepreneurship rather than a comprehensive history of Canada as a whole.

Federal Member of Parliament Pierre Nantel successfully moved to have a representative from the CBC appear before the Canadian House of Commons Standing Committee on Canadian Heritage to discuss the series and its reception.

=== Response ===
The CBC and Bristow Global Media responded to the criticism by stating that the series was not meant to be a definitive or linear history of Canada, but simply to illustrate and depict 50 selected moments. The criticism resulted in the CBC scheduling a series of "live digital conversations", for viewers to discuss and debate the remaining episodes.
