= Flashing arrow =

Cue in visual media

A flashing arrow is a type of emphasized foreshadowing, an audiovisual cue used in films and similar visual media to bring the attention of the audience to a particular object or situation, which will later be referred to or used in the advancement of plot. In an extreme example, it could literally be a flashing arrow pointing at the object, but the term is usually metaphorical, referring to visual focus and/or accompanying sound effects or music. The term is often used disapprovingly, in reference to works for unsophisticated audiences.

Example of this include: a camera close-up in a horror movie that suggests information such as danger from an unlocked door; a scene in an action film in which the hero is in a difficult-to-escape situation, a brief cut to a shot of the item they will use to save themselves; and recurring mundane shots of a person or thing, with the repetition indicating that it will become important later.

An example of repetition as a form of flashing arrow is in the film Natural Born Killers during a scene in which the protagonist stabs to death a young woman with a pencil; the pencil shows up in nearly every cut scene before the girl's death. In the film Stranger than Fiction, the child with a bike and the bus driver appear in numerous scenes before both of them become a factor in Harold Crick's "death".

A literal flashing arrow is used occasionally, such as in the 1981 film Student Bodies to mock it as a cliché. This is mentioned in Everything Bad Is Good for You, where the authors says works that have little use of this and require figuring things out yourself have a more deductive viewer base. Another example is in the anime Ouran High School Host Club, where it is used repeatedly, for instance in the first episode, in which a flashing arrow and high-pitched beeping noise indicate a vase that a character breaks later in the scene.

The technique is sometimes used in other media as well. With the more limited cinematic framing options of video games, the important object or clue may itself glow or flash to draw attention to it. In comics, the technique may be performed by including a single panel focusing on the object, or by a literal arrow pointing to it.

== See also ==
- Chekhov's gun
