= Everything Bad Is Good for You =

2005 non-fiction book by Steven Johnson

Everything Bad Is Good for You: How Today's Popular Culture Is Actually Making Us Smarter
- Author: Steven Johnson
- Cover artist: Jamie Keenan
- Language: English
- Subject: Popular culture, cultural studies
- Publisher: Riverhead Books
- Publication date: May 2005
- Pages: 272
- ISBN: 978-1-59448-194-9
- OCLC: 69992179
- LC Class: HM621 .J64 2006

Everything Bad Is Good for You: How Today's Popular Culture Is Actually Making Us Smarter is a non-fiction book written by Steven Johnson. Published in 2005, it details Johnson's theory that popular culture – in particular television programs and video games – has grown more complex and demanding over time and is making society as a whole more intelligent, contrary to the perception that modern electronic media are harmful or unconstructive. The book's claims, especially related to the proposed benefits of television, drew media attention. It received mixed critical reviews.

Johnson states that he aims to persuade readers of "two things:

1. By almost all the standards we use to measure reading's cognitive benefits — attention, memory, following threads, and so on — the nonliterary popular culture has been steadily growing more challenging over the past thirty years.
2. Increasingly, the nonliterary popular culture is honing different mental skills that are just as important as the ones exercised by reading books."

== Key concepts ==
Johnson challenges the precept that pop culture is deteriorating as a result of new media platforms. He derives the term Sleeper Curve from the Woody Allen film Sleeper, where "scientists from 2173 are astounded that twentieth-century society failed to grasp the nutritional merits of cream pies and hot fudge". He uses this to argue against contemporary perception of the deteriorating standards of pop culture, although Johnson is quick to point out that by no means does the Sleeper Curve imply that popular culture has become superior to traditional culture. Johnson utilizes the following media sources to support his argument:

=== Video games ===
He argues that the appeal of video games is not through their (possibly violent or sexual) content, but rather through the fact that the "structure" of the video games uniquely invites exploration and stimulates the reward centers of the brain. In pointing out arguments for the support of video games, Johnson sheds light on how kids can be more involved in games than in class, but this involvement can teach them that which could be taught in class. To substantiate this argument, he discusses how games and other virtual worlds have immediate rewards, whereas in reality, rewards can take a while to obtain. Johnson states "if you create a system where rewards are both clearly defined and achieved by exploring an environment, you'll find human brains drawn to those systems, even if they're made up of virtual characters and simulated sidewalks. It's not the subject matter of these games that attracts…it's the reward system". Finally, he argues for the support of video games because they also require one to make decisions, whereas books and other forms of art may conjure up imagination and emotions but don't require decision-making.

Johnson acknowledges that although the video game industry is growing, the literature on the subject is limited at best. Johnson offers several sources for information on ludology; Ludology.org and seriousgames.org as well as the books Got Game by John Beck and Mitchell Wade and The Play Ethic by Pat Kane.

=== Television and film ===
Johnson admits that television and film demand less decision-making skills than video games, but also says that the benefits from reading (attention, patience, retention, the parsing of narrative threads, etc.) are making a rise in television and film as well, despite its lack of translating letters to meaning or activating the imagination in quite the same way that books do. He discusses three principles of television and film: "multiple threading," "flashing arrow," and "social networks." "Multiple threading", according to Johnson, is marrying complex narrative structure to complex subject matter with multiple plots and subplots (for example, he states that shows like ER & 24 have up to 10 threads per episode). He suggests too that modern television and films have reduced the number of "flashing arrows", narrative clues or signposts planted by the writer to help the audience understand the plot, and require audiences to do more cognitive work paying attention to background detail and information if they wish to follow what they are viewing. Finally, he states that "reality shows demand that we track multiple relationships, since the action of these shows revolves around the shifting feuds and alliances between more than a dozen individuals" Johnson says this activates social intelligence, defining it as "our ability to monitor and recall many distinct vectors of interaction in the population around us" and, thus, watchers shall be able to better understand social networks. He asserts that television is a "brilliant medium" for determining how skilled people are at understanding interpersonal connections, or their Autism Quotient (the higher a person's emotional intelligence, the lower their "AQ"), and that reality shows in particular realistically display the complexity of "social network maps" in human relations, where a group of people have complex and intertwined engagement.

Earlier television, Johnson says, simplified narrative and human relationships, while modern trends not only in reality shows but in "multiple threading" in scripted programs such as The Sopranos improve the audience's cognitive skills.

Later in the book, he mentions that these features of television are also prevalent in film, too.

=== The internet ===
Johnson argues that the internet "has challenged our minds in three fundamental and related ways: by being participatory, by forcing users to learn new interfaces, and by creating new channels for social interaction." He uses blogs and utilizing Google to learn things as examples of participation. He declares that "accelerating pace of new platforms and software applications forces users to probe and master new environments" such as "learning the tricks of a new e-mail client, configuring the video chat software properly, getting your bearings after installing a new operating system." Additionally, he points out that "in the past few years [the Web has] been [a tool] for augmenting social connection" naming "online personals, social and business network sites such as Friendster, the meetup.com service so central to the political organization of the 2004 campaign." Overall, he presents evidence to buttress the Internet's benefits.

== Critical reception ==
The book has received mixed critical reviews. In a review for The New York Times, Janet Maslin was primarily negative, dismissing the book's "facile argument" and sparsity of hard evidence, saying that "The reader rattles around within the book's narrow universe and repeatedly bumps into the same thing: reiterations of Mr. Johnson's one big idea." In another, Walter Kirn, while acknowledging a lack of science and questioning some of the book's premises with regards to the benefits of reality TV, praised Johnson's "elegant polemic", concluding that "[c]onsidered purely on its own terms, Johnson's thesis holds up despite these quibbles."

Wired gave the book an overall positive review, describing it as "chock-full of interesting insights that are clearly the reflection of an agile and catholic intellect", but also suggested that the book is largely built around a straw man argument and thus "largely misses the point of the more valid critique of today's pop culture". The Guardian found part of Johnson's thesis — that some elements of pop culture have grown more complex — persuasive, but not the second claim that this greater complexity offers any tangible benefits for the public aside from preparing them to handle more complex pop culture; it criticized the shortage of hard science and the conclusions drawn from what science exists, as well as the application of literary theory to visual arts media. The Associated Press review praised the book overall as "an engaging read", although it noted that the book was uneven, with TV and video game discussions better than those on film and the internet, and repetitive in presenting its theme. Salon.com described it simply as "a fine contrarian defense of pop culture".
