= Krakatoa (explosive) =

Modular explosive used for ordinance disposal & demolitions

The Krakatoa Shaped Charge System by Alford Technologies Ltd.

Krakatoa is a modular explosive device used for explosive ordnance disposal (EOD) or demolitions developed by the British company Alford Technologies. The device is designed to fire a number of different projectiles, operates both in air and underwater, and can be used in a vertical or horizontal orientation.

The device was featured during the second season of Discovery Channel's television series Future Weapons, in which it was shown penetrating an inch of steel plate at 25 yards. The device's casing is made of plastic which is packed with plastique (C4) and capped with an inverted copper cone.

The device itself is "no bigger than a standard can of coke."

It is named after the 1883 eruption of Krakatoa, which resulted in the loudest sound ever heard and was the second deadliest volcanic eruption in recorded history.

== Uses ==
This explosive device was designed to play a role in covert operations, as a small but extremely powerful device that can disable tanks, vehicles, or even a warship. The device can be used underwater, at high altitudes, and in snow, hail, sleet, or any form of weather.

The device has copper cone with a driving charge of very fast high explosive behind it. The metal cone is the difference between a regular C4 'slappack' or hollow charge and a HEAT device.

When detonated, the copper cone is inverted into a narrow stream of copper and fired at extremely high velocity at the target, this can pierce certain thicknesses of steel armor or concrete.

== Characteristics and use ==
The weapon looks like a small circular tube, no wider than a tea-cup plate and no taller than a soft-drink can. On one end, it is covered with plastic, but the other end houses the copper cone. Inside the actual device is C4, and this is used to form the copper into an explosively formed penetrator and turn it into a weapon. So far unused in war, it is tested standing on a small pair of bipod legs, and the copper cone is faced toward the target. There is a 'stand off distance' to allow correct formation of the penetrator stream. This is the reason for its legs.

For a special ops team, the weapon will already have the C4 placed inside, about two pounds of it, and being a versatile explosive, the weapon will not set off in any condition. One uses it by placing it on the stand, moving far away from it and then pressing the detonator. The whole weapon itself explodes, so it is not a handheld weapon or a device to stand near when operating or firing.
