= Cleanskin (film) =

2012 film

- UK theatrical release poster
- Directed by: Hadi Hajaig
- Screenplay by: Hadi Hajaig
- Produced by: Hadi Hajaig
- Starring: Sean Bean; Abhin Galeya; Tuppence Middleton; Tom Burke; Charlotte Rampling
- Cinematography: Ian Howes
- Edited by: H. H. Hajaig
- Music by: Simon Lambros
- Production company: The UK Film Studio
- Distributed by: Warner Bros. Pictures
- Release date: 9 March 2012
- Running time: 108 minutes
- Country: United Kingdom
- Language: English
- Box office: $79,664

Cleanskin is a 2012 British spy thriller film written and directed by Hadi Hajaig and starring Sean Bean, Abhin Galeya, Charlotte Rampling, James Fox, Tuppence Middleton, Shivani Ghai and Michelle Ryan. The story is set in London. The film's title, "cleanskin", is a term for an undercover operative unknown to his or her targets, or, as more commonly used in the United Kingdom following the London bombings, an extremist with no previous convictions, so unknown to national security's services.

== Plot ==
Harry, an American arms dealer in London, is seen in bed with a prostitute named Rena. Later, Harry and his bodyguard Ewan, who is actually an undercover British secret service (Note: Presumably MI5, although this is never specified.) agent and former soldier, travel to a bank, transporting a briefcase of Semtex. The men are followed by two terrorists, Ash and Paul. Ash incapacitates Ewan, kills Harry and takes the briefcase. However, Ewan manages to shoot Ash in the arm before losing consciousness.

Ash sews the stolen Semtex into a jacket with an explosive belt. He gives the jacket to Adel, who detonates it at a popular London restaurant. Being the only person who knows about the stolen explosives, Ewan is tasked by his superiors Charlotte and Scott to find and eliminate the terrorists who created the bomb. His mission is off-the-books and isolated from the agency. He is given an assistant, Mark. Ewan finds and interrogates Rena. She tells Ewan and Mark that a client she frequented, Paul, paid her for information about Harry and to unload his gun. Ewan, Mark, and Rena attempt to capture Paul at his residence. Paul kills Rena, but is killed by Ewan.

At a café, Ash sees Kate, his former lover at university, and they exchange numbers. A series of flashbacks reveal Ash's recruitment into the terrorist organisation. Six years ago, Ash and Kate were dating while attending law school. Nabil, an Afghan Muslim extremist cleric, befriends Ash and asks him to join the pro-Muslim student group he heads. Ash and his friend Yussif join the group and are exposed to Nabil's anti-Western teachings. Kate's liking for drink and drugs alienates Ash, prompting him to break up with her. Ash devotes himself to Nabil's cause, and helps capture and murder a former soldier, Greg Conlan, with Yussif and Conlan's family dying in the process.

In the present, Ewan and Mark are sent to an abandoned building they are told is the home of a terrorist. Ewan confronts the man they find there and interrogates him. The man begs for mercy, but Ewan burns him to death. Searching the building, Ewan takes the man's jacket. Ewan and Mark arrive at a housing estate, where they are noticed by Ash and another man wearing a bulky jacket. The unknown man takes off running, and Ash gets away on his motorcycle. Mark chases after the unknown man and shoots him dead. Mark and Ewan are told by Charlotte that the secret service has found out about their covert mission and is hunting them. Later, when Ewan is asleep in a hotel, Mark breaks in and tries to kill him, but is himself killed by Ewan. Isolated, Ewan resolves to destroy the terror cell before he is killed. Using Mark's earpiece, he discovers that Mark's allies are facilitating the next bombing.

Ash spends time with Kate and leaves her for a final suicide mission. Nabil tasks Ash with killing the American head of a pro-Iraqi War think tank at his daughter's wedding in London. Ash makes a video explaining his reasons justifying his planned suicide attack. He travels to the wedding reception but is confronted by Ewan. Both are wounded in a fight in the kitchens, but Ash gets away. Disguising himself as a chef, Ash makes his way to the reception's top table, but he is shot dead by Ewan. After disabling the detonator, Ewan leaves the hotel. At the exit, Ewan notices men in suits delivering luggage on a trolley into the hotel lobby and then driving away from the hotel. Moments later, a bomb hidden in this luggage detonates in the hotel lobby, killing Nabil's targets.

In the epilogue, Ewan finds a safe deposit box key in the jacket of the man he killed earlier. He discovers a folder and video camera. He watches the tape, which identifies the man as Hussein Malik, like Ewan an undercover secret service agent and former soldier. Ewan, after seeing the file and recording, deduces that Charlotte engineered everything including the bombings to facilitate the election of a more right-wing government which would introduce tougher security measures, including her replacing Scott as head of the secret service. She used Ewan as she knew how much he hated terrorists after his wife was killed by a terrorist bomb. Ewan confronts Charlotte at her countryside mansion and kills her, framing her death as a suicide.

== Cast ==
- Sean Bean as Ewan
- Abhin Galeya as Ash
- Charlotte Rampling as Charlotte McQueen
- Peter Polycarpou as Nabil
- Tom Burke as Mark
- Tuppence Middleton as Kate
- Michelle Ryan as Emma
- Sam Douglas as Harry
- James Fox as Sir Scott Catesby
- Tariq Jordan as Paul
- Shivani Ghai as Rena
- Chris Ryman as Yussif

== Reception ==
As of 3 February 2014, Cleanskin held a critical approval rating of 53% on Rotten Tomatoes.
