= First Degree =

Drama series

First Degree is a nine-part drama television series made by BBC Wales that aired in 2002. The series follows the lives, trials and tribulations of students in the fictional Bay College, one of several hi-tech media schools owned and run by an enigmatic entrepreneur based in Sacramento, California known only as The Founder.

== Cast ==
- Adam Randall as Gethin
- Adam Allfrey as Steffan
- Jade Capstick as Rachel
- Nicholas Aaron as Sion
- Salima Saxton as Rehema
- Victor Spinetti as The Founder
- Caroline Hayes as Johanna
- John Moraitis as Principal Maurice
- Phil Read as Ioan
- Anita Reynolds as Sarah
- Amanda Rawnsley as Maddy
- Sarah Farooqui as "Taz"
- Abhin Galeya as Jay
- Jonjo O'Neill as "Cookie"

== See also ==
- List of Welsh television series
