= Future Perfect (book) =

2012 nonfiction book by Steven Johnson

Future Perfect: The Case for Progress in a Networked Age
- Author: Steven Johnson
- Cover artist: Saily Namundjebo
- Language: English
- Subject: Popular culture, Cultural studies
- Publisher: Riverhead
- Publication date: September 2012
- Publication place: United States
- Pages: 272
- ISBN: 978-1-59463-184-9

Future Perfect: The Case for Progress in a Networked Age (2012) is a non-fiction book published in 2012 by American author Steven Berlin Johnson. In the book, Johnson presents a new political worldview he names “peer progressivism.” This idea promotes collaboration amongst peers and the development of peer networks for the purpose of accomplishing large undertakings and ultimately helping society grow and change for the better.

== Key concepts ==
The main idea that Johnson promotes in Future Perfect is that productivity and innovation are best achieved through the collaborative efforts of a peer network rather than the restrictive structure of a hierarchical system. In a peer network, individuals aren’t as interested in competition or profit. Johnson presents his idea as a new political movement, with its followers referring to themselves as “peer progressives." This new political view avoids the traditional ideas of both big government and also big markets.

Future Perfect is characterized by applicable anecdotes that aid in giving deeper explanations of his ideas. Johnson uses stories that highlight successful peer networks, such as the 3-1-1 call system, a program used in New York City allowing residents to call in issues that need to be addressed throughout the city, or also the story of a prize-based system developed by a small group of men in 18th century Britain that offered incentives to citizens who could help foster innovation in manufacturing and the arts. Johnson also uses examples of failed systems and projects, and then he analyzes the cause of the failure to determine how to learn from their mistakes. In a hierarchical organization, all of the intelligence is kept in the center of the network, leading to the decision-making being non-inclusive and stifling the flow of information. The story of the Legrand Star, the inefficiently designed French railway system that uses Paris as a central hub for all passenger trains, is Johnson’s main illustration of a failed system. These stories all promote Johnson’s idea of a decentralized peer network, one where there isn’t a clear group or location that has more power or control than another. Johnson argues that a large, diverse group of non-experts will generally make larger leaps in innovation than a small group of experts.

== Critical reception ==
Future Perfect has been received positively overall. It received praises from The Boston Globe, The Wall Street Journal and Publishers Weekly Amongst the praise, there were a handful of reviews that criticized Johnson’s ideas as being optimistic and an utopian." The Guardian addresses this criticism and explains that Johnson refutes this opinion by clarifying that he thinks of the Internet as being one example of a generally successful peer network, but he does not see it as a “cure-all." The Boston Globe argues that Johnson is not attempting to be original in his promotion of peer progressivism, rather he is reminding society to continue practicing communal decision-making as we advance in the digital age.

== See also ==
- Commons-based peer production
- Collaborative e-democracy
- Emergent democracy
- P2P economic system
- Network economy
- Sharing economy
