= Gary Oliver (actor) =

English actor (born 1966)

- Born: 19 November 1966 (age 59); Northampton, England
- Occupation: Actor
- Years active: 1995–present

Gary Oliver (born 19 November 1966) is an English actor of the stage, television, and film. He is known for his guest starring roles in Game of Thrones, New Tricks and Atlantis.

== Career ==
Oliver is principally active as a stage actor. In 1990 he performed in Carlos Muñiz's The Inkwell at the Battersea Arts Centre. In 1991 he appeared in Shakespeare's Romeo and Juliet at The New Hereford Theatre. In 1994 he performed in Max Frisch's The Fire Raisers with Arts Threshold, Gloucester Terrace. In 1995 he starred in Brad Fraser's Unidentified Human Remains and the True Nature of Love at the Royal Exchange, Manchester.

Oliver has performed with the Royal Shakespeare Company (RSC). In 1997 he toured with the RSC to perform the role of Balthazar in Shakespeare's The Comedy of Errors at the San Francisco Shakespeare Festival under the direction of Tim Supple. In 1998 he starred in the premiere of Andrew Payne's two man one act play then what? at The Old Red Lion, Islington. In 1999 he starred as Louis Ironson in Tony Kushner's Angels in America at the Manchester Central Library Theatre with Peter Polycarpou as Roy Cohn and Richard Cant as Prior. That same year he starred as Gary in Lynne Harvey's Something for Grownups at the Drayton Court Theatre. In 2000 he performed in the Royal National Theatre's production of Anton Chekhov's The Cherry Orchard.

After appearing in the final scene of the HBO series Game of Thrones in season 4, Oliver reprised his role as Ternesio Terys in season 5.

== Filmography ==
Year	Title	Role	Notes
1995	Soldier Soldier	Sgt. Major Fellner	TV series; 1 episode
1996	Heartbeat	Mihail	TV series; 1 episode
1999	Kavanagh QC	Jack Wilkle	TV series; 1 episode
1999, 2002	The Bill	Dean / Keith Canning	TV series; 2 episodes
2007	Doctors	Patrick Tansley	TV series; 1 episode
2008	Merlin	Gregory	TV series; 2 episodes
2013	New Tricks	Tony Otway	TV series; 1 episode
2013–2014	Atlantis	Alytarch	TV series; 2 episodes
2013	The Bible	Abraham	TV series; 1 episode
2014–2015	Game of Thrones	Ternesio Terys	TV series; 2 episodes
2017	Father Brown	Frank Hammond	TV series/Episode 5.13 "The Tanganyika Green"
2017	Bitter Harvest	Joseph Stalin	Feature film
2018	Benidorm	Franco	2 episodes (series 10, episodes 5 and 6)
2019	Jesus: His Life	King Herod the Great	TV series; 1 episode
2020	Young Wallander	Commissioner	TV series; 1 episode
2021	Eight for Silver (a.k.a. The Cursed)	Sir John	Feature film
