= Trade Your Way to the USA =

- Genre: Trading; Gameshow
- Directed by: Jessica Parrish
- Presented by: Saira Khan
- Country of origin: United Kingdom
- Original language: English
- No. of seasons: 3
- No. of episodes: 30

Production
- Production locations: United Kingdom; United States
- Running time: 30 minutes

Original release
- Network: CBBC Channel
- Release: 14 February 2011 – 26 April 2013

Trade Your Way to the USA is a children's reality television gameshow that is presented by The Apprentice Series 1 runner-up Saira Khan. The show is about young traders aged between eleven and fourteen attempting to negotiate and haggle when buying in order to get the best deals when selling products. A second series began on 23 April 2012. A third series began on CBBC at 4:30 on Monday 15 April 2013 and lasted 10 episodes.

== Format ==
Fourteen teams are selected by the show's producers and proceed to the heats, where each team battles against another team to win a place in the semi-finals. The top four teams out of those winning each challenge then take on each other in two semi-finals. The winners of each semi-final will then go on to the grand final in New York. In series two the format is the same except for the final which is held in Dallas, Texas. In series 3 the format is the same except once again with the final held in Florida.

== Series 1 (2011) ==
=== Episodes ===
(All winners in Bold)

1. Episode 1: Flowers (**OAPs** and Camphillian Traders)
2. Episode 2: Medieval (The Three Profiteers and **Impulse**)
3. Episode 3: Fruit (The Friendlee Traders and **Sapphire**)
4. Episode 4: Cakes (**Prosperity** and MoneyTalks)
5. Episode 5: Sovenirs (**Aspire** and New Minds)
6. Episode 6: Toys (Trendz and **Sky Limit**)
7. Episode 7: Cheese (**The Determinators** and Stylo)
8. Episode 8: Fancy Dress (**Sapphire** and The Determinators )
9. Episode 9: Balloons (**Aspire** and Prosperity)
10. Episode 10: Final – Pretzels – New York (Sapphire and **Aspire**)

== Series 2 (2012) ==
=== Episodes ===
(All winners in Bold)

1. Episode 1: Magic Tricks – York (**ARD** and DNA)
2. Episode 2: Ghoulish Souvenirs – Edinburgh (**Team Adder** and Unfinished Business)
3. Episode 3: Ice Creams – Cornwall (**3's company** and Burning Money)
4. Episode 4: Glow in the Dark Goods – Manchester (**Street Smart Sellers** and Carpe Diem)
5. Episode 5: Circus Tricks – Blackpool ( Bargain Buckets and **3 Riskateers**)
6. Episode 6: Caribbean Smoothies – Derbyshire (Triple Traders and **Team Synergy**)
7. Episode 7: Paw Print T-shirts – Derbyshire (**Penny Pinchers** and Destiny Hawks)
8. Episode 8: Cupcakes – London (3's company and **Street Smart Sellers**)
9. Episode 9: Chocolate – Brighton (**Team Synergy** and Penny Pinchers)
10. Episode 10: Final – Cookies – Dallas, Texas (**Street Smart Sellers** and Team Synergy)

== Series 3 (2013) ==
=== Episodes ===
(All winners in Bold)

1. Episode 1: Fudge – Dumfries (**Top Dogs** and Treble Clef)
2. Episode 2: Bath Bombs and Soaps – Bath (Cha-Ching and **Sterling**)
3. Episode 3: Viking Balloons – York (**Victores** and Profiteroles)
4. Episode 4: Sausages – Yorkshire ( Dominators and **Team Hagglers**)
5. Episode 5: Children's Masks – London (**New to the Business** and Heads or Tails)
6. Episode 6: Superhero Cookies – London ( Boundary Breakers and **Determination**)
7. Episode 7: Frozen Yogurt – Brighton ( **Piggy Bankers** and Trademark Traders)
8. Episode 8: Popcorn – London (Determination and **Top Dogs**)
9. Episode 9: Clown Props – Bognor Regis (Victores and **Sterling**)
10. Episode 10 Final – Donuts – Florida (Top Dogs and **Sterling**)
