= Australia: The Story of Us =

- Title card of Australia: The Story of Us
- Genre: Television documentary
- Presented by: Richard Roxburgh
- Country of origin: Australia
- Original language: English
- No. of seasons: 1
- No. of episodes: 8

Production
- Running time: 50–65 minutes

Original release
- Network: Seven Network
- Release: 15 February – 23 April 2015

Related
- America: The Story of Us; Canada: The Story of Us; Mankind: The Story of All of Us

Australia: The Story of Us is a television documentary drama which aired on the Seven Network between 15 February 2015 and 23 April 2015.

It was listed in the Daily Review's 'Top 10 must see Australian TV shows of 2015'.

== Show details ==
Australia: The Story of Us is a localised version of the American television documentary series, America: The Story of Us. Narrated by Richard Roxburgh, it features interviews with prominent Australians including, among others, Chris Bath, Professor Tim Flannery, Ben Roberts-Smith, Tim Costello, Guy Sebastian, Dannii Minogue, Bruce McAvaney and Adam Goodes. The series looks back at some of the people, places and events that have shaped the country over the last 40,000 years.

Channel Seven's showrunner Chris Thorburn said; "I want the audience to be surprised, proud, entertained and awed; to walk away with a view of where we have come from and to see our story in a new light".

== Reviews ==
Melinda Houston of the Sydney Morning Herald gave the show 3.5/5 saying; "Unashamedly celebratory and unashamedly populist, this new factual series from Seven is great entertainment that is also good for you. Using the same model as the US and British versions – big re-enactments, computer-generated images, talking heads who span the spectrum from serious academics to television actors, all threaded together by an energetic narration – The Story of Us takes key moments and characters from Australian history to tell the story of the nation. It is not a professorial piece of work, but it does not pretend to be. It's a rollicking yarn built on solid fact and, by that measure, it works splendidly".

David Knox of TvTonight was more critical. He said; "...this feels decidedly over-produced to me. The tone and editing upstage the history in a constant ploy to bring it closer to primetime drama." He added, "It is the over-produced drama (or even melodrama) that is most distracting here, which is a shame given the source material is so rich."

However, David Stephens on HonestHistory.net sums it up best by saying: "Overall, ASU makes an honest effort to deliver varied fare to fast-history consumers. Inevitably, short-order cooking ruins some dishes but four episodes of ASU fed into a young Australian would do more good than harm. Viewing these episodes would certainly give a more balanced (albeit superficial) view of this nation than would be obtained by, say, strolling through the Australian War Memorial. ASU deserves comparison with Defining Moments at the National Museum of Australia and Chris Masters’ The Years that Made Us as an introduction to an Australia that is about not only Anzac but lots of other things as well. In this year of all years, any production that puts our great Australian bellicosity in its proper, proportionate place is to be welcomed."

== Ratings ==
Episode	Title	Original airdate	Overnight Viewers	Nightly Rank
1-01	"Worlds Collide"	15 February 2015	876,000	8
1-02	"Break Out"	22 February 2015	945,000	5
1-03	"Fair Go"	1 March 2015	838,000	4
1-04	"New Nation at War"	8 March 2015	737,000	7
1-05	"Phar Lap"	15 March 2015	894,000	11
1-06	"Nation Building"	22 March 2015	866,000	7
1-07	"Revolution"	16 April 2015	653,000	9
1-08	"Final Frontier"	23 April 2015	723,000	8
