= Future Weapons =

- Future Weapons intertitle
- Created by: Waddell Media
- Developed by: Waddell Media
- Starring: Richard Machowicz
- Country of origin: United States
- No. of seasons: 3
- No. of episodes: 29 (list of episodes)

Production
- Executive producer: David Cummings
- Producer: John Macnish
- Running time: approximately 60 minutes

Original release
- Network: Discovery Channel
- Release: April 19, 2006 – April 24, 2008

Future Weapons, sometimes also written as FutureWeapons and Futureweapons, is a television series that premiered on April 19, 2006, on the Discovery Channel.

Host Richard "Mack" Machowicz, a former Navy SEAL, reviewed and demonstrated the latest modern weaponry and military technology. The program is currently broadcast on the Discovery Channel and Military Channel (now American Heroes Channel).

== Episode list ==
=== Season 1 (2006) ===
No. overall	No. in season	Title	Original release date
1	1	"No Place to Hide"	April 19, 2006
FGM-148 Javelin (US), CornerShot (Israel), PzH 2000 (Germany), JSF (US / UK)
2	2	"Stealth"	April 26, 2006
M107 Long Range Sniper Rifle (US), Type 212 U-boat (Germany), RQ-1 Predator (US), Persistent Munition Technology Demonstrator (US)
3	3	"Maximum Impact"	May 3, 2006
Metal Storm (Australia), Thermobaric weapons, MLRS (US), NLOS Cannon (US)
4	4	"Future Shock"	May 10, 2006
EMP Weapons, LRAD (US), Advanced tactical laser (US), Tactical High Energy Laser (Israel / US), Airborne Laser (US)
5	5	"Smart Weapons"	May 17, 2006
XM982 Excalibur (Sweden / US), SWORDS (US), AH-64 Apache Longbow (US), Starstreak missile (UK)
6	6	"The Power of Fear"	May 26, 2006
CBU-97 Sensor Fuzed Weapon (US), IMI Tavor TAR-21 (Israel), Bioterrorism & Anthrax (US), MOAB (US)

=== Season 2 (2007) ===
No. overall	No. in season	Title	Original release date
7	1	"Search and Destroy"	January 19, 2007
SMAW (US), AS50 sniper rifle (UK), MQ-8 Fire Scout (US), Vulcan EOD (UK), Aardvark MK 4 (UK)
8	2	"The Protectors"	January 22, 2007
Dragon Skin (US), THAAD (US), "Boot Banger" (UK), M32 Multiple Grenade Launcher (South Africa)
9	3	"No Escape"	January 29, 2007
MP7 (Germany), F-22 Raptor (US), "Gate Crasher" (UK), ATACMS (US)
10	4	"Mission Invisible"	February 5, 2007
B-2 Spirit (US), .416 Barrett (US), Krakatoa (UK), USS Texas (US)
11	5	"Front Line"	February 12, 2007
V-22 Osprey (US), XM307 (US), Land Warrior (US), Stryker (US)
12	6	"First Strike"	February 19, 2007
Expeditionary Fighting Vehicle (US), Heckler & Koch HK416 assault rifle (Germany), Bangalore Blade (UK), NLOS-LS (US)
13	7	"Predators"	February 26, 2007
RQ-4 Global Hawk (US), GBU-39 SDB (US), Laser JDAM (US), Dragon Fire II (US), Mk 48 (US)
14	8	"Top Guns"	March 5, 2007
F/A-18E/F Super Hornet (US), Barrett M468 (US), M777 (US / UK), USS Dwight D. Eisenhower (US)
15	9	"Smart Destroyers"	March 12, 2007
Protector Unmanned Surface Vehicle (Israel), Intelligent Munitions (US), ARCHER Artillery System (Sweden), Squad Mission Support System robot vehicle (US)
16	10	"Close Quarter Combat"	March 17, 2007
TDI Vector (At this point called TDI Kriss) (Switzerland / US), AT4-CS (Sweden), Grizzly APC (US), Auto Assault-12 Shotgun (US)
17	11	"Immediate Action"	March 26, 2007
Cougar AFV (US), CROWS (US), Dragon – incinerate anti-personnel mine in situ with fireworks-like torch, Boomerang mobile shooter detection system
18	12	"Future Combat"	April 2, 2007
Active Denial System (US), Crusher (US), US Army's Future Combat Systems (US)
19	13	"Massive Attack"	April 9, 2007
AC130 Spooky (US), Electromagnetic Rail Gun, USS San Antonio (US), Cheytac 200 (US)

=== Season 3 (2007–2008) ===
No. overall	No. in season	Title	Original release date
20	1	"Firepower"	November 15, 2007
Aquaram Tactical Disrupter (Canada), Land Warfare Resources Corporation Infantry Automatic Rifle (US), SAAB BOFORS RBS 70 Short-Range Missile System (Sweden), Knight's Armament M110 Sniper Rifle (US)
21	2	"Non-Lethal Special"	November 29, 2007
ALS 400 Series Stun Munitions, TASER X-26TM Electronic Control Device & XREPTM, Beretta LTLX7000 Kinetic Energy Weapon, QINETIQ X-NET Vehicle Arrest Device
22	3	"Close Protection"	December 6, 2007
Optosecurity Liquid Threat Technology (Canada), BAE Systems 57mm Mk110 Naval Gun (Sweden), LWRC M6 A2 PSD (US), Israel Military Industries Wave Remote Weapons Station (Israel)
23	4	"Israel Special"	December 13, 2007
ELBIT Systems Viper Portable Combat Robot (Israel), Hydro-NOA Menny D4 Door Buster (Israel), Hydro-NOA Sharon Breaching Kit (Israel), Corner Shot 7.62 mm Assault Pistol Rifle (Israel), IMI Micro Tavor Assault Rifle (Israel), Rafael Simon 150 Rifle-Launched Grenade (Israel), Matador Shoulder-Launched Missile System (Singapore, license manufactured by RAFAEL)
24	5	"GUNS"	December 20, 2007
ATK MK44 Bushmaster Automatic Cannon (US), Dillon Aero M134D Gatling Gun (US), Magpul Masada Assault Rifle (US), Knight's Armament Personal Defense Weapon (US)
25	6	"Future Warrior"	March 5, 2008
LWRC SABR 0.308 Assault/Sniper Rifle (US), BAE Systems Commercial Armored Vehicle (UK), MULE Unmanned ground vehicle (US), Elbit Systems Skylark UAV (Israel)
26	7	"Hard Target"	March 12, 2008
Armorflate Rubber Armor System (US), MEI Mercury 40 mm grenade (US), A-10C Thunderbolt II Ground Attack Aircraft (US), Alexander Arms 6.5 mm Grendel Assault Rifle (US)
27	8	"Israel Special 2"	March 19, 2008
Merkava IV Main Battle Tank (Israel), Iron Fist active protection system (Israel), SPYDER-SR Air Defense System (Israel), Delilah Cruise Missile (Israel)
28	9	"Kill Zone"	March 26, 2008
Little Bird UAV (US), Intelligent Optical System Aimfinder, X-47B Unmanned Combat Aerial Vehicle (US), Beowulf Assault Rifle (US)
29	10	"Alaska Special"	April 24, 2008
Arctic Survival Training School, Stryker Mobile Gun System, M56E1 Smoke Generator, Arctic Warfare SuperMagnum Sniper Rifle

== See also ==
- Weaponology is another similar show broadcast on the Military Channel. Its first season focused on the history of weapons like the sniper rifle, submarines or tanks. Its second season dealt with elite units like the Navy SEALs, the SAS.
- Deadliest Warrior is a similar program in which information on historical or modern warriors and their weapons are used to determine which of them is the "deadliest" based upon tests performed during each episode. As of Season 3, Mack is one of the show's hosts.
