= Mankind: The Story of All of Us =

American documentary television series

- Genre: Historical non-fiction
- Narrated by: Josh Brolin (US and Asia); Jay Taruc (Philippines); Stephen Fry (UK); Brian Williams (US); Jack Thompson (AU/NZ)
- Country of origin: United States
- Original language: English
- No. of episodes: 12

Production
- Executive producers: Ben Goold; Jen Root; Paul Cabana; Julian P. Hobbs
- Running time: 60 minutes
- Production company: Nutopia

Original release
- Network: History
- Release: November 13, 2012

Related
- America: The Story of Us; Australia: The Story of Us; Canada: The Story of Us

Mankind: The Story of All of Us is an American documentary television series on the History Channel that premiered on November 13, 2012, in the United States and the United Kingdom, and on November 14, 2012, in Asia. The broadcast is narrated by Josh Brolin in the United States, Stephen Fry in the UK, and Jack Thompson in Australia and New Zealand. Mediaset in Italy aired the program on Italia 1 on 12 July 2013. The Hollywood Reporter and The New York Times gave overall positive reviews to the series.

== Episodes ==
No.	Title	Original release date	U.S. viewers (millions)
1	"Inventors"	November 13, 2012	2.14
On a unique planet, a unique species takes its first steps: Mankind begins. But it's a world full of danger. Threatened by extinction, we innovate to survive, discovering fire and farming, building cities and pyramids, inventing trade, and mastering the art of war. From humble beginnings, humans become the dominant creatures on the planet.
2	"Iron Men"	November 13, 2012	N/A
A mysterious band of pirates plunders the Mediterranean coast, leaving destruction in its wake. Empires fall, but out of the chaos, we discover iron. Armed with this wonder metal, ordinary folk can overthrow tyrants and build a new world order. From the birth of democracy in Athens, to the creation of the Bible in Babylon, people power reshapes Mankind.
3	"Empires"	November 20, 2012	1.82
The crucifixion of Jesus gives birth to global religion, but Christianity may never have happened without the Roman Empire: the Roman Empire's vast network of roads and shipping lanes allows goods and ideas to flow across three continents, allowing Jesus' message to transform Mankind around the world.
4	"Warriors"	November 20, 2012	N/A
When Rome is sacked by barbarians, Europe enters a Dark Age. But from the fringes of the old empire, two new forces remake the world. The Arabs, funded by a gold rush, unite under the banner of Islam. The Vikings rejuvenate the cities of Europe, travel to America and become Christian knights. The stage is now set for a clash of civilizations: the Crusades.
5	"Plague"	November 27, 2012	N/A
Genghis Khan, the bloodiest warlord in history, sweeps south from Mongolia into China and creates a mighty empire. He leaves 40 million dead bodies in his wake. But a greater killer stalks Mankind: the Plague. Traveling along Mongol trade routes, the disease wreaks havoc in Asia and Europe, the greatest biological disaster in history. But the Americas are unaffected and civilizations flourish there in isolation.
6	"Survivors"	November 27, 2012	N/A
Gold from Africa kickstarts the rebirth of Europe. Money flows into Venice, creating new opportunities for entrepreneurs willing to take risks. In China, the invention of the gun allows a peasant uprising to unify the country. Chinese innovations inspire Europe, leading to the printing press. Millions of books are printed. One of them will inspire a journey to the New World.
7	"New World"	December 4, 2012	N/A
The Aztecs have built a mighty empire that dominates Central America. But it will be destroyed because of a domino effect. 7,000 miles away in modern-day Turkey, the great trading center of Constantinople is overrun by an Islamic army. Europeans race to find a new route to the spice-rich East. Christopher Columbus lands in America and discovers gold. Within 30 years the Aztecs will be conquered.
8	"Treasure"	December 4, 2012	N/A
In the Andes, the Spanish open up the largest silver mine in the world and mint millions of pesos de ocho (pieces of eight). These coins transform the global economy. They fill the treasure chests of pirates. They fuel a stock market boom and help pay for the Taj Mahal. As trade booms, millions of people come to the New World as slaves. But a handful of Pilgrims come as pioneers looking for freedom.
9	"Pioneers"	December 11, 2012	N/A
Mankind embarks on a new age of exploration and tames the wilderness. In North America, Siberia and Australia ancient traditions are swept away in the name of commerce and science. Within a hundred years, the irrational fear that produced a witch trial in Salem gives way to a very rational cry for freedom. American revolutionaries confront a mighty empire. The battle for the modern world begins.
10	"Revolutions"	December 11, 2012	N/A
Two great revolutions entwine. The American Revolution inspires dreams of political and personal liberty. The Industrial Revolution replaces muscle power with machines, freeing Mankind from nature's limits. But our oldest foe–disease–thrives in industrial cities. With the American Civil War, the two revolutions collide. The world's first industrial war, it is a battle to define freedom.
11	"Speed"	December 18, 2012	N/A
Following the American Civil War, an age of global innovation, mass production, and optimism ensues. Japan transitions from feudal society to industrial superpower within 50 years. The demand for rubber devastates Africa. And the desire to build bigger, faster, better leads to a titanic disaster.
12	"New Frontiers"	December 18, 2012	N/A
Mankind assumes greater powers: to feed billions of people, reshape the landscape, re-engineer the human body. Nazi Germany and Imperial Japan create massive empires across Europe and Asia and World War II ensues. The greatest power of all was unleashed over Hiroshima on August 6, 1945. The Civil Rights Movement takes place in the 1960s. Since entering the Atomic Age we've been living between eternity and oblivion. But at the same time, we've become more connected as a species. 100,000 years ago there were a few thousand hunter-gatherers on the African savannah. Today there are 7 billion of us in every corner of the globe.
