= Nutopia (production company) =

Television production company

- Type: Independent
- Industry: Television production
- Founded: London, 2008
- Headquarters: London, United Kingdom
- Key people: Jane Root (Founder & Chief Executive); Carl Griffin (Managing Director); Caroline McCool (Head of Production); Simon Willgoss (Chief Creative Officer)
- Website: www.nutopia.com

Nutopia is an independent television production company established in 2008 with offices in the UK and the US. Headquartered in London and Washington DC, Nutopia is best known for producing high-end premium series. Many have featured notable A-list talent such as Tom Hanks, Will Smith, Jeff Goldblum and Chris Hemsworth.

Nutopia’s projects have been shown globally on many different platforms including Netflix, Disney+, HBO Max, National Geographic, History, BBC, ITV, Channel 4 and others.

Jane Root, former president of Discovery Channel and Controller of BBC Two, is CEO. She founded Nutopia in 2008 and according to The Guardian, set out with the aim of producing and selling large-scale television projects.

Nutopia was established with board members Michael Jackson, Sir Peter Bazalgette and Laura Franses in 2008. Franses left the company in 2012 and Bazalgette left in 2016 on becoming Chairman of ITV.

Nutopia’s current senior team includes Simon Willgoss as Chief Creative Officer, Caroline McCool as Head of Production and Carl Griffin as Managing Director.

== History ==
Nutopia's first production was the 12-hour America: The Story of Us series for History US in 2010, which drew 5.7 million viewers upon its first episode. The high level drama documentary was combined with famous Americans describing what it meant to be American: and the show was introduced by President Obama, also including comments from Donald Trump, Meryl Streep, and Colin Powell [3]. The success of the programme led to further adaptations of the format, including Mankind: The Story of All of Us and Australia: The Story of Us, The British, Canada: The Story of Us .

In 2025, Nutopia partnered again with the History Channel to produce Secrets Declassified with David Duchovny, with the first season premiering in April 2025 and the second season scheduled for March 2026. Hosted and executive produced by David Duchovny, the docuseries explores covert government programmes, declassified operations, and historical mysteries revealed through newly released files, combining archival footage, expert commentary, and storytelling

Nutopia’s upcoming projects include a 20 hour World War II documentary series, fronted by Tom Hanks, in partnership with A+E Factual Studios for The History Channel. The 20-part series will chart the war’s global scope and impact from major battles and pivotal turning points to social and political upheaval [39]. The series will use rare archives and expert narration to provide a comprehensive historical account. A&E Networks will distribute the series internationally.

In 2015, the TV show announced the co-produced documentary, Australia: The Story of Us. It was a regionalized version of the American television documentary series, which studied the history of the country. This included people, places and events that have shaped the country over the last 40,000 years. Towards the end of the year, the Smithsonian Channel aired My Million Dollar Invention. NY Daily News referred to the series as an "ambitious 8 part series," which studies a number of historical inventions. The third installment of the decade-based documentaries was televised in 2015, The 2000s: A New Reality. Nutopia also announced the creation of the documentary, Finding Jesus. It studied new insights into the historical facts surrounding him and using new scientific techniques to study his life. Also in 2015, Nutopia produced the Emmy Award-winning How We Got to Now with Steven Johnson, which also had a companion book of the same title and website How We Get To Next. The show won an Emmy for Outstanding Motion Design in 2015.

Nutopia announced in late 2015 that they would be working on a TV series with Bear Grylls. Britain's biggest adventures with Bear Grylls aired on ITV and received positive reviews for studying the British landscape, including the Scottish Highlands and Snowdon.

In 2016, Nutopia and Bristow Global Media announced Canada: The Story of Us for CBC. Nutopia is also currently producing a six-part series on the history of Africa, hosted by Professor Henry Louis Gates, Jr. The series is being created in association with McGee Media.

Nutopia produced the National Geographic series One Strange Rock, which premiered on March 26, 2018. The second season is set to premiere in 2019. Also in March 2018, Nutopia launched Civilisations, an art history television documentary series co-produced by the BBC in association with PBS as a follow-up to the original 1969 landmark series Civilisation by Kenneth Clark.

In May 2018, Nutopia's The Great American Read launched on PBS. Hosted by Meredith Vieira, the series sought to discover America's favorite novel, in which viewers could vote from a list of 100 finalists to determine "America's Best Loved Novel." The winner of the vote was Harper Lee's "To Kill a Mockingbird".

In January 2019, it was announced that Nutopia's Jesus: His Life will debut on A&E on March 25. The series is told from the perspective of different biblical figures, scholars and historians, weaving together historical sources and cultural context to create a portrait of Jesus.

== Premium Documentary ==
Nutopia One Strange Rock which was released in 2018 and was hosted by actor and rapper, Will Smith . A minor element of the show involved the creation of dramatic sequences on the International Space Station and unique ways of filming oxygen bubbles. Nutopia partnered with Darren Aronofsky’s production company, Protozoa Pictures for the production. In 2021, Welcome to Earth, also featuring Will Smith for National Geographic and Disney+, who travelled to several international locations. The series was shot across various extreme locations including the freezing Arctic Circle to the Lechuguilla Cave in Carlsbad Caverns National [6]. As part of Smith’s challenge to learn about their natural mysteries, he was joined by polar explorer, Dwayne Fields.

== Notable productions ==
- America: The Story of Us (2010)
- Australia: The Story of Us (2015)
- Britain's Biggest Adventures with Bear Grylls (2015)
- Civilisations (2018)
- Limitless with Chris Hemsworth (2022)
- Mankind: The Story of All of Us (2012)
- One Strange Rock (2018)
- The '90s: The Last Great Decade (2014)
- The World According to Jeff Goldblum (2019-2023)
