= Jane Root =

BBC executive (born 1957)

Jane Marianna Root (born 18 May 1957) is an executive in the media industry. She was controller of BBC Two from 1999 to 2004, and the first woman to serve as a channel controller for the BBC. She became president of Discovery Networks in the United States in 2004.

Root worked as a researcher and a producer on a range of projects including working with Michael Jackson on the Channel 4 series Open The Box. She also wrote the accompanying book Open the Box: About Television (1986) as well as the accompanying book to the series Pictures of Women titled Pictures of Women: Sexuality (1984).

== Education ==
Root studied Media Studies at London College of Communication, before moving on to Sussex University to study International Relations. Later awarded an honorary doctorate from the university in 2002, she worked for several years as a freelance journalist, writing for publications such as Honey, The Guardian, and Cosmopolitan. She also worked as a journalist with the British Film Institute and with the Cinema of Women film collective.

== Career in mass media ==
=== Wall to Wall ===
In 1987, Root co-founded and was Joint Managing Director of independent production company Wall to Wall. She helped to launch The Media Show, a defining program from the early years of Channel 4. During her tenure, alongside business partner Alex Graham, she helped nurture Wall to Wall from being a start-up to becoming 'one of the leading factual programme-makers in the business', best known in the United States for Texas Ranger House on PBS. The company was recently sold to Shed Media.

=== The BBC ===
In 1997, Root became the head of the BBC's Independent Commissioning Group, a new department tasked with finding 25% of the BBC's output from the independent production sector. The group – which dealt with drama, entertainment and factual – was responsible for hits like The Naked Chef, and Root was dubbed the "high priestess of lifestyle television" after she championed Jamie Oliver.

In 1999, she became Controller for BBC Two, running the UK's 3rd largest network, and was the first woman controller of a BBC television channel. Her controllership included commissioning the original British series of The Office as well as Coupling, The Weakest Link, Top Gear, What Not to Wear, and Who Do You Think You Are?. During her time as controller, the network also had a relationship with HBO which produced Band of Brothers and Rome. Root is credited with the success of viewer vote 'event' programming like Great Britons, a format which went on to be sold to countries around the world. The series was received with a mixed response in the press, with some critics targeting the populist nature of the chosen personalities. The Big Read, a series with a similar public vote format, was equally successful with viewers but was reviled by some critics.

There were criticisms of her time at the channel, "Root's BBC Two increasingly gave the impression of being pieced together on the flimsiest of whims", with claims that the arts and 'serious' documentaries were sidelined in pursuit of ratings, leaving it to BBC Four to develop innovative programmes. However, Root defended the "real revitalisation in current affairs and arts programming" that she oversaw at BBC2, with cultural programming such as Mozart, and Love Again (about poet Philip Larkin) as prime examples. In the five years Root was controller, during which BBC Two celebrated its 40th anniversary, the channel bucked the trend in declining viewing figures by increasing its audience share. Under Root, BBC Two was the third most-watched channel in the UK, with ratings consistently above 11%. The network also won the prestigious "Channel of the Year" award for two years in a row at the Edinburgh International Television Festival.

Root left her position at the BBC in 2004, and moved to the US to join Discovery Networks. Jana Bennett, Director of Television at the BBC, said at the time that the channel was losing "an exceptional creative talent who has inspired programme-makers". She was succeeded by Roly Keating. In 2009 Janice Hadlow, current controller of BBC2 talked about her influence in an article in The Guardian newspaper and said "A lot of the things Jane did were extraordinary, channel defining".

=== Discovery Networks USA ===
As President of Discovery Networks, Root ran a portfolio of channels that included Discovery Channel, Science Channel, Military Channel and Times Channel (now called Investigation Discovery).

During her presidency, she re-positioned the network with shows such as Deadliest Catch, Man vs. Wild, and Dirty Jobs. She also organised the promotion around Planet Earth, a joint venture with the BBC, which quickly became one of Discovery's biggest hits.

These shows helped find a new audience for the 20-year-old network, particularly among 25-to-54-year-old males. This led to record ratings and primetime increases of 10% in 2006 and 13% in 2007, and overall ratings up in 2007 to 16%.

In digital, Discovery.com experienced 200% growth in page views in 2007 alone. The site was also part of the Top Ten Digital Hot List in Adweek in the same year, where the network was praised for truly delivering on both online video content and multi-platform ad opportunities.

In 2007, Discovery announced her departure from the channel. She was replaced at Discovery by John Ford.

There was much speculation in the British press that she would be taking up the role of controller of BBC1, but in the event the job went to Jay Hunt, a former BBC Daytime controller.

=== Nutopia ===
In 2008, Root returned to the independent production sector to set up a new TV production company called Nutopia. The new company aims to focus on ambitious factual series of all types, as well as factually-inspired drama.

Root is CEO and the Managing Director is Carl Griffin, a former Disney, Universal and HBO exec. Other board members are Michael Jackson and Peter Bazalgette.

In May 2009, it was announced that Nutopia's first commission would be the 12-part series America: The Story of US for the History Channel. The series focuses on American history, from the origins of the country to infrastructural and technological development, exploring the people, places and things that shaped its history. The series achieved the highest-rated special documentary in the network's history,[2] with the debut show gaining 5.7 million viewers

In December 2010, Root gave the Keynote speech at the SPAA Conference in Sydney. She is also an active commentator on the television industry.

In 2019, she produced the drama series Jesus: His Life, about the life of Jesus.

Media offices
| Preceded by Mark Thompson | Controller of BBC Two; 1999-2004 | Succeeded by Roly Keating |
