= Primetime Emmy Award for Outstanding Performer in a Short Form Comedy or Drama Series =

Television award category

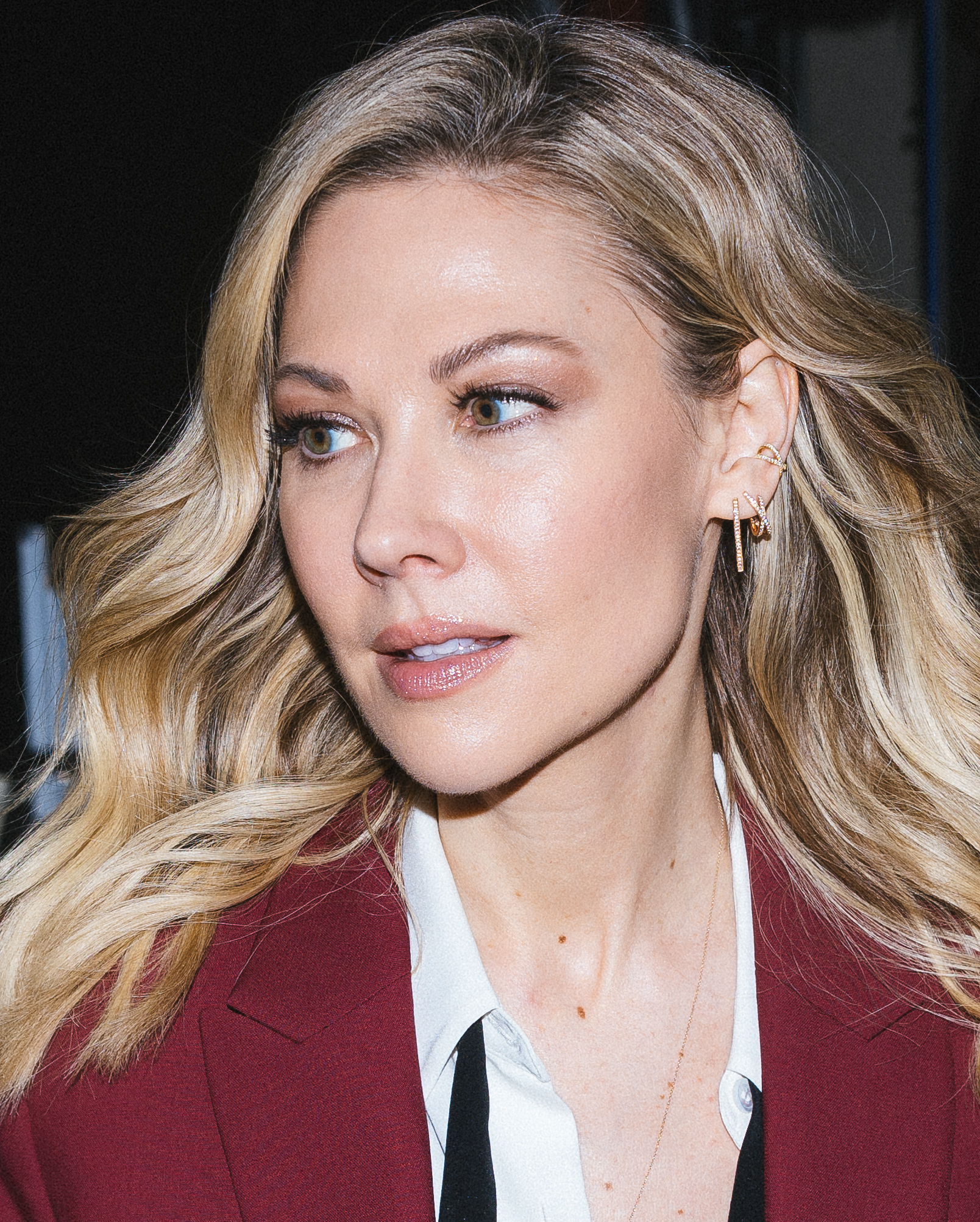
- The 2025 recipient: Desi Lydic
- Awarded for: Outstanding Performer in a Short Form Comedy or Drama Series
- Country: United States
- Presented by: Academy of Television Arts & Sciences
- First award: 2016 (separate actor/actress); 2024 (performance)
- Currently held by: Desi Lydic, The Daily Show: Desi Lydic Foxsplains (2026)
- Website: emmys.com

The Primetime Emmy Award for Outstanding Performer in a Short Form Comedy or Drama Series is an award presented to performers in short-format television series.

From 2016 to 2023, two separate awards were given for Outstanding Actress in a Short Form Comedy or Drama Series and Outstanding Actor in a Short Form Comedy or Drama Series. Starting in 2024, the awards were combined into a single award for Outstanding Performer.

== Winners and nominations ==
Indicates the winner

=== 2010s ===
Year	Actor	Program	Role	Network
2016 (68th)	Outstanding Actor in a Short Form Comedy or Drama Series			
2016 (68th)	Rob Corddry	Childrens Hospital	Dr. Blake Downs	Adult Swim
2016 (68th)	Rob Huebel	Childrens Hospital	Dr. Owen Maestro	Adult Swim
2016 (68th)	Jack McBrayer	Your Pretty Face Is Going to Hell	Ollie	Adult Swim
2016 (68th)	Oscar Nunez	The Crossroads of History	Jack	History
2016 (68th)	Lou Diamond Phillips	The Crossroads of History	Chieftain	History
2016 (68th)	Outstanding Actress in a Short Form Comedy or Drama Series			
2016 (68th)	Patrika Darbo	Acting Dead	Margot Mullen	ActingDead.com
2016 (68th)	Michelle Ang	Fear the Walking Dead: Flight 462	Alex	AMC
2016 (68th)	Erinn Hayes	Childrens Hospital	Lola Spratt	Adult Swim
2016 (68th)	Tracie Thoms	Send Me: An Original Web Series	Gwen	BET.com
2016 (68th)	Janet Varney	Everyone's Crazy But Us	Denie Silverman	Funny or Die
2017 (69th)	Outstanding Actor in a Short Form Comedy or Drama Series			
2017 (69th)	Kim Estes	Dicks	Amanda	Vimeo
2017 (69th)	Ty Burrell	Boondoggle	Ty	ABCd/ABC.com
2017 (69th)	John Michael Higgins	Tween Fest	Todd Crawford	Go90
2017 (69th)	Jason Ritter	Tales of Titans	Greg	Go90
2017 (69th)	Ben Schwartz	The Earliest Show	Josh Bath	Funny or Die
2017 (69th)	Alan Tudyk	Con Man	Wray Nerely	Comic-Con HQ
2017 (69th)	Outstanding Actress in a Short Form Comedy or Drama Series			
2017 (69th)	Jane Lynch	Dropping the Soap	Olivia Vanderstein	Amazon
2017 (69th)	Lauren Lapkus	The Earliest Show	Samantha Newman	Funny or Die
2017 (69th)	Kelsey Scott	Fear the Walking Dead: Passage	Sierra	AMC.com
2017 (69th)	Mindy Sterling	Con Man	Bobbie	Comic-Con HQ
2017 (69th)	Mindy Sterling	secs & EXECS	Shirla	tellofilms.com
2018 (70th)	Outstanding Actor in a Short Form Comedy or Drama Series			
2018 (70th)	James Corden	James Corden's Next James Corden	James Corden	CBS on Snapchat
2018 (70th)	Alexis Denisof	I Love Bekka & Lucy	Glenn	Stage13.com
2018 (70th)	Melvin Jackson Jr.	This Eddie Murphy Role Is Mine, Not Yours	Melvin Jackson Jr./Eddie Murphy	YouTube
2018 (70th)	DeStorm Power	Caught: The Series	DeStorm Power	YouTube
2018 (70th)	Miles Tagtmeyer	Broken	Liam	Vimeo
2018 (70th)	Outstanding Actress in a Short Form Comedy or Drama Series			
2018 (70th)	Christina Pickles	Break a Hip	Biz	Vimeo
2018 (70th)	Megan Amram	An Emmy for Megan	Megan Amram	anemmyformegan.com
2018 (70th)	Lee Garlington	Broken	Darlene	Vimeo
2018 (70th)	Naomi Grossman	Ctrl Alt Delete	Lorna	Facebook
2018 (70th)	Diarra Kilpatrick	American Koko	Akosua Millard	abc.go.com
2018 (70th)	Kelli O'Hara	The Accidental Wolf	Katie Bonner	theaccidentalwolf.com
2019 (71st)	Outstanding Actor in a Short Form Comedy or Drama Series			
2019 (71st)	Chris O'Dowd	State of the Union	Tom	Sundance TV
2019 (71st)	Ed Begley Jr.	Ctrl Alt Delete	Dr. Rosenblatt	Vimeo
2019 (71st)	Jimmy Fallon	Beto Breaks the Internet	Beto O'Rourke	NBC
2019 (71st)	Ryan O'Connell (Note: In 2019, Jonathan Banks was nominated for the AMC series Better Call Saul Employee Training: Madrigal Electromotive Security. The nomination was rescinded after it was determined that several episodes were shorter than two minutes, violating the Television Academy's rule that six episodes air during the eligibility period with a runtime of at least two minutes. Sixth place finisher Ryan O'Connell became the fifth nominee.)	Special	Ryan Hayes	Netflix
2019 (71st)	Patton Oswalt	An Emmy for Megan	Patton	anemmyformegan.com
2019 (71st)	Outstanding Actress in a Short Form Comedy or Drama Series			
2019 (71st)	Rosamund Pike	State of the Union	Louise	Sundance TV
2019 (71st)	Ilana Glazer	Hack Into Broad City	Ilana Wexler	Comedy Central
2019 (71st)	Jessica Hecht	Special	Mom	Netflix
2019 (71st)	Abbi Jacobson	Hack Into Broad City	Abbi Abrams	Comedy Central
2019 (71st)	Punam Patel	Special	Kim Laghari	Netflix

=== 2020s ===
Year	Actor	Program	Role	Network
2020 (72nd)	Outstanding Actor in a Short Form Comedy or Drama Series			
2020 (72nd)	Laurence Fishburne	#FreeRayshawn	Lt. Steven Poincy	Quibi
2020 (72nd)	Mamoudou Athie	Oh Jerome, No (Cake)	Jerome	FX
2020 (72nd)	Corey Hawkins	Survive	Paul	Quibi
2020 (72nd)	Stephan James	#FreeRayshawn	Rayshawn Morris	Quibi
2020 (72nd)	Christoph Waltz	Most Dangerous Game	Miles Sellars	Quibi
2020 (72nd)	Outstanding Actress in a Short Form Comedy or Drama Series			
2020 (72nd)	Jasmine Cephas Jones	#FreeRayshawn	Tyisha	Quibi
2020 (72nd)	Anna Kendrick	Dummy	Cody Heller	Quibi
2020 (72nd)	Kerri Kenney-Silver	Reno 911!	Deputy Trudy Wiegel	Quibi
2020 (72nd)	Kaitlin Olson	Flipped	Cricket Melfi	Quibi
2020 (72nd)	Rain Valdez	Razor Tongue	Belle Jonas	YouTube
2021 (73rd)	Outstanding Actor in a Short Form Comedy or Drama Series			
2021 (73rd)	J. B. Smoove	Mapleworth Murders	Chief Billy Bills	Quibi
2021 (73rd)	Brendan Scannell	Bonding	Pete Devon	Netflix
2021 (73rd)	Kevin Hart	Die Hart	Himself	Quibi
2021 (73rd)	John Lutz	Mapleworth Murders	Gilbert Pewntz	Quibi
2021 (73rd)	John Travolta	Die Hart	Ron Wilcox	Quibi
2021 (73rd)	Outstanding Actress in a Short Form Comedy or Drama Series			
2021 (73rd)	Keke Palmer	Keke Palmer's Turnt Up with the Taylors	Barbie / Gammy Tay / Lil Thad / Miranda / Rick	Facebook Watch
2021 (73rd)	Nathalie Emmanuel	Die Hart	Jordan King	Quibi
2021 (73rd)	Kerri Kenney-Silver	Reno 911!	Deputy Trudy Wiegel	Quibi
2021 (73rd)	Paula Pell	Mapleworth Murders	Mrs. Abigail Mapleworth	Quibi
2022 (74th)	Outstanding Actor in a Short Form Comedy or Drama Series			
2022 (74th)	Tim Robinson	I Think You Should Leave with Tim Robinson	Various Characters	Netflix
2022 (74th)	Anthony A. Anderson	Anacostia	Sean Williams-Grey	YouTube
2022 (74th)	Bill Burr	Immoral Compass	Rick	Roku
2022 (74th)	Brendan Gleeson	State of the Union	Scott	Sundance TV
2022 (74th)	Ikechukwu Ufomadu	Words with Ike (Cake)	Ikechukwu Ufomadu	FX
2022 (74th)	Outstanding Actress in a Short Form Comedy or Drama Series			
2022 (74th)	Patricia Clarkson	State of the Union	Ellen	Sundance TV
2022 (74th)	Jacinte Blankenship	Intersection	Jenaya	YouTube
2022 (74th)	Desi Lydic	Desi Lydic Foxsplains	Desi Lydic	YouTube
2022 (74th)	Rhea Seehorn	Cooper's Bar	Kris Latimer	YouTube
2022 (74th)	Sydnee Washington	Bridesman	Judith	YouTube
2023 (75th)	Outstanding Actor in a Short Form Comedy or Drama Series			
2023 (75th)	Tim Robinson	I Think You Should Leave with Tim Robinson	Various Characters	Netflix
2023 (75th)	Kevin Hart	Die Hart 2: Die Harter	Himself	Roku
2023 (75th)	Ben Schwartz	Die Hart 2: Die Harter	Andre	Roku
2023 (75th)	Outstanding Actress in a Short Form Comedy or Drama Series			
2023 (75th)	Jasmine Guy	Chronicles of Jessica Wu	Barbara Baldwin	Prime Video
2023 (75th)	Nathalie Emmanuel	Die Hart 2: Die Harter	Jordan King	Roku
2023 (75th)	Paula Pell	Die Hart 2: Die Harter	Cynthia	Roku
2024 (76th)	Outstanding Performer in a Short Form Comedy or Drama Series			
2024 (76th)	Eric André	The Eric Andre Show	Various Characters	Adult Swim
2024 (76th)	Desi Lydic	Desi Lydic Foxsplains — The Daily Show	Herself	YouTube
2024 (76th)	Mena Suvari	RZR	Detective Thompson	Gala Film
2025 (77th)
2025 (77th)	Desi Lydic	The Daily Show: Desi Lydic Foxsplains	Herself	YouTube
2025 (77th)	Nathalie Emmanuel	Die Hart: Hart to Kill	Jordan King	Roku
2025 (77th)	Kevin Hart	Die Hart: Hart to Kill	Himself	Roku
2025 (77th)	Tom Segura	Bad Thoughts	Various Characters	Netflix
2025 (77th)	J. K. Simmons	Die Hart: Hart to Kill	Jackson Pepper	Roku
2026 (78th)
2026 (78th)	Desi Lydic	The Daily Show: Desi Lydic Foxsplains	Herself	YouTube
2026 (78th)	Kim Estes	Big Law	Boyd Bennett	Vimeo
2026 (78th)	Randy Rainbow	The Randy Rainbow Show	Himself	YouTube

== Multiple wins ==
2 wins

- Desi Lydic
- Tim Robinson

== Multiple nominations ==
4 nominations

- Desi Lydic

3 nominations

- Nathalie Emmanuel
- Kevin Hart

2 nominations

- Kim Estes
- Kerri Kenney-Silver
- Paula Pell
- Tim Robinson
- Ben Schwartz
- Mindy Sterling
