= Primetime Emmy Award for Outstanding Actress in a Short Form Comedy or Drama Series =

Television award category

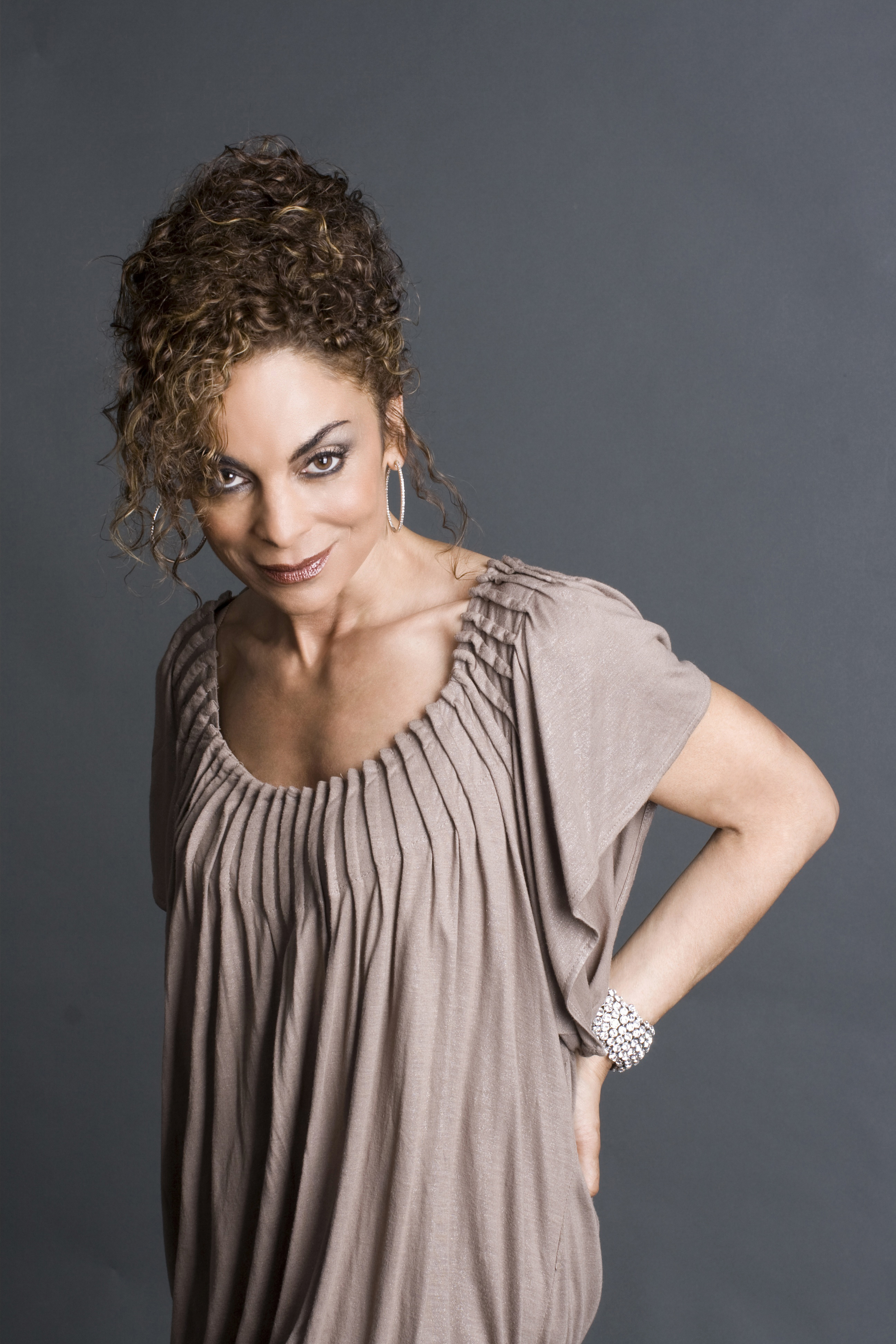
- The 2023 recipient: Jasmine Guy
- Awarded for: Outstanding Actress in a Short Form Comedy or Drama Series
- Country: United States
- Presented by: Academy of Television Arts & Sciences
- First award: 2016
- Final award: 2023
- Currently held by: Jasmine Guy, Chronicles of Jessica Wu (2023)
- Website: emmys.com

This is a list of winners and nominees of the Primetime Emmy Award for Outstanding Actress in a Short Form Comedy or Drama Series. These awards, like the guest acting awards, are not presented at the Primetime Emmy Awards show, but, rather, at the Creative Arts Emmy Award ceremony.

In January 2024, the Television Academy announced several rule changes for the 76th Emmy Awards, including adjustments to the short form categories. Due to a decline in submissions over the past five years, the Academy combined the separate awards for Outstanding Actor and Outstanding Actress in a Short Form Comedy or Drama Series into a single, gender-neutral category: Outstanding Performer in a Short Form Comedy or Drama Series. This consolidation aimed to streamline the awards process and better reflect the current state of short form content.

== Winners and nominations ==
Indicates the winner

=== 2010s ===
Year	Actor	Program	Role	Network
2016 (68th)
2016 (68th)	Patrika Darbo	Acting Dead	Margot Mullen	ActingDead.com
2016 (68th)	Michelle Ang	Fear the Walking Dead: Flight 462	Alex	AMC
2016 (68th)	Erinn Hayes	Childrens Hospital	Lola Spratt	Adult Swim
2016 (68th)	Tracie Thoms	Send Me: an original web series	Gwen	BET.com
2016 (68th)	Janet Varney	Everyone's Crazy But Us	Denie Silverman	funnyordie.com
2017 (69th)
2017 (69th)	Jane Lynch	Dropping the Soap	Olivia Vanderstein	Amazon
2017 (69th)	Lauren Lapkus	The Earliest Show	Samantha Newman	Funny or Die
2017 (69th)	Kelsey Scott	Fear the Walking Dead: Passage	Sierra	AMC.com
2017 (69th)	Mindy Sterling	Con Man	Bobbie	Comic-Con HQ
2017 (69th)	Mindy Sterling	secs & EXECS	Shirla	tellofilms.com
2018 (70th)
2018 (70th)	Christina Pickles	Break a Hip	Biz	Vimeo
2018 (70th)	Megan Amram	An Emmy for Megan	Megan Amram	anemmyformegan.com
2018 (70th)	Lee Garlington	Broken	Darlene	Vimeo
2018 (70th)	Naomi Grossman	Ctrl Alt Delete	Lorna	Facebook.com
2018 (70th)	Diarra Kilpatrick	American Koko	Akosua Millard	abc.go.com
2018 (70th)	Kelli O'Hara	The Accidental Wolf	Katie Bonner	theaccidentalwolf.com
2019 (71st)
2019 (71st)	Rosamund Pike	State of the Union	Louise	Sundance
2019 (71st)	Ilana Glazer	Hack Into Broad City	Ilana Wexler	Comedy Central
2019 (71st)	Jessica Hecht	Special	Mom	Netflix
2019 (71st)	Abbi Jacobson	Hack Into Broad City	Abbi Abrams	Comedy Central
2019 (71st)	Punam Patel	Special	Kim Laghari	Netflix

=== 2020s ===
Year	Actor	Program	Role	Network
2020 (72nd)
2020 (72nd)	Jasmine Cephas Jones	#FreeRayshawn	Tyisha	Quibi
2020 (72nd)	Anna Kendrick	Dummy	Cody Heller	Quibi
2020 (72nd)	Kerri Kenney-Silver	Reno 911!	Deputy Trudy Wiegel	Quibi
2020 (72nd)	Kaitlin Olson	Flipped	Cricket Melfi	Quibi
2020 (72nd)	Rain Valdez	Razor Tongue	Belle Jonas	YouTube
2021 (73rd)
2021 (73rd)	Keke Palmer	Keke Palmer's Turnt Up with the Taylors	Barbie / Gammy Tay / Lil Thad / Miranda / Rick	Facebook Watch
2021 (73rd)	Nathalie Emmanuel	Die Hart	Jordan King	Quibi
2021 (73rd)	Kerri Kenney-Silver	Reno 911!	Deputy Trudy Wiegel	Quibi
2021 (73rd)	Paula Pell	Mapleworth Murders	Mrs. Abigail Mapleworth	Quibi
2022 (74th)
2022 (74th)	Patricia Clarkson	State of the Union	Ellen	Sundance TV
2022 (74th)	Jacinte Blankenship	Intersection	Jenaya	YouTube
2022 (74th)	Desi Lydic	Desi Lydic Foxsplains	Desi Lydic	YouTube
2022 (74th)	Rhea Seehorn	Cooper's Bar	Kris Latimer	YouTube
2022 (74th)	Sydnee Washington	Bridesman	Judith	YouTube
2023 (75th)
2023 (75th)	Jasmine Guy	Chronicles of Jessica Wu	Barbara Baldwin	Prime Video
2023 (75th)	Nathalie Emmanuel	Die Hart 2: Die Harter	Jordan King	The Roku Channel
2023 (75th)	Paula Pell	Die Hart 2: Die Harter	Cynthia	The Roku Channel

== Multiple nominations ==
2 nominations

- Nathalie Emmanuel
- Kerri Kenney-Silver
- Paula Pell
- Mindy Sterling
