= Primetime Emmy Award for Outstanding Actor in a Short Form Comedy or Drama Series =

Television award category

- Awarded for: Outstanding Actor in a Short Form Comedy or Drama Series
- Country: United States
- Presented by: Academy of Television Arts & Sciences
- First award: 2016
- Final award: 2023
- Currently held by: Tim Robinson, I Think You Should Leave with Tim Robinson (2023)
- Website: emmys.com

This is a list of winners and nominees of the Primetime Emmy Award for Outstanding Actor in a Short Form Comedy or Drama Series. These awards, like the guest acting awards, are not presented at the Primetime Emmy Awards show, but rather at the Creative Arts Emmy Award ceremony.

In January 2024, the Television Academy announced several rule changes for the 76th Emmy Awards, including adjustments to the short form categories. Due to a decline in submissions over the past five years, the Academy combined the separate awards for Outstanding Actor and Outstanding Actress in a Short Form Comedy or Drama Series into a single, gender-neutral category: Outstanding Performer in a Short Form Comedy or Drama Series. This consolidation aimed to streamline the awards process and better reflect the current state of short form content.

== Winners and nominations ==
indicates the winner

=== 2010s ===
Year	Actor	Program	Role	Network
2016 (68th)
2016 (68th)	Rob Corddry	Childrens Hospital	Dr. Blake Downs	Adult Swim
2016 (68th)	Rob Huebel	Childrens Hospital	Dr. Owen Maestro	Adult Swim
2016 (68th)	Jack McBrayer	Your Pretty Face Is Going to Hell	Ollie	Adult Swim
2016 (68th)	Oscar Nunez	The Crossroads of History	Jack	History
2016 (68th)	Lou Diamond Phillips	The Crossroads of History	Chieftain	History
2017 (69th)
2017 (69th)	Kim Estes	Dicks	Amanda	Vimeo
2017 (69th)	Ty Burrell	Boondoggle	Ty	ABCd/ABC.com
2017 (69th)	John Michael Higgins	Tween Fest	Todd Crawford	Go90
2017 (69th)	Jason Ritter	Tales of Titans	Greg	Go90
2017 (69th)	Ben Schwartz	The Earliest Show	Josh Bath	Funny or Die
2017 (69th)	Alan Tudyk	Con Man	Wray Nerely	Comic-Con HQ
2018 (70th)
2018 (70th)	James Corden	James Corden's Next James Corden	James Corden	CBS on Snapchat
2018 (70th)	Alexis Denisof	I Love Bekka & Lucy	Glenn	Stage13.com
2018 (70th)	Melvin Jackson Jr.	This Eddie Murphy Role Is Mine, Not Yours	Melvin Jackson Jr./Eddie Murphy	YouTube
2018 (70th)	DeStorm Power	Caught: The Series	DeStorm Power	YouTube
2018 (70th)	Miles Tagtmeyer	Broken	Liam	Vimeo
2019 (71st)
2019 (71st)	Chris O'Dowd	State of the Union	Tom	Sundance
2019 (71st)	Ed Begley Jr.	Ctrl Alt Delete	Dr. Rosenblatt	Vimeo
2019 (71st)	Jimmy Fallon	Beto Breaks the Internet	Beto O'Rourke	NBC
2019 (71st)	Ryan O'Connell (Note: In 2019, Jonathan Banks was nominated for the AMC series Better Call Saul Employee Training: Madrigal Electromotive Security. The nomination was rescinded after it was determined that several episodes were shorter than two minutes, violating the TV Academy's rule that six episodes air during the eligibility period with a runtime of at least two minutes. Sixth place finisher Ryan O'Connell became the fifth nominee.)	Special	Ryan Hayes	Netflix
2019 (71st)	Patton Oswalt	An Emmy for Megan	Patton	AnEmmyForMegan.com

=== 2020s ===
Year	Actor	Program	Role	Network
2020 (72nd)
2020 (72nd)	Laurence Fishburne	#FreeRayshawn	Lt. Steven Poincy	Quibi
2020 (72nd)	Mamoudou Athie	Oh Jerome, No (Cake)	Jerome	FX
2020 (72nd)	Corey Hawkins	Survive	Paul	Quibi
2020 (72nd)	Stephan James	#FreeRayshawn	Rayshawn Morris	Quibi
2020 (72nd)	Christoph Waltz	Most Dangerous Game	Miles Sellars	Quibi
2021 (73rd)
2021 (73rd)	J. B. Smoove	Mapleworth Murders	Chief Billy Bills	Quibi
2021 (73rd)	Brendan Scannell	Bonding	Pete Devon	Netflix
2021 (73rd)	Kevin Hart	Die Hart	Kevin Hart	Quibi
2021 (73rd)	John Lutz	Mapleworth Murders	Gilbert Pewntz	Quibi
2021 (73rd)	John Travolta	Die Hart	Ron Wilcox	Quibi
2022 (74th)
2022 (74th)	Tim Robinson	I Think You Should Leave with Tim Robinson	Various Characters	Netflix
2022 (74th)	Anthony A. Anderson	Anacostia	Sean Williams-Grey	YouTube
2022 (74th)	Bill Burr	Immoral Compass	Rick	Roku
2022 (74th)	Brendan Gleeson	State of the Union	Scott	Sundance TV
2022 (74th)	Ikechukwu Ufomadu	Words With Ike (Cake)	Ikechukwu Ufomadu	FX
2023 (75th)
2023 (75th)	Tim Robinson	I Think You Should Leave with Tim Robinson	Various Characters	Netflix
2023 (75th)	Kevin Hart	Die Hart 2: Die Harter	Kevin Hart	The Roku Channel
2023 (75th)	Ben Schwartz	Die Hart 2: Die Harter	Andre	The Roku Channel

== Multiple wins ==
2 wins

- Tim Robinson (consecutive)

== Multiple nominations ==
2 nominations

- Kevin Hart
- Tim Robinson
- Ben Schwartz
