= List of awards and nominations received by Stephen Frears =

Stephen Frears awards and nominations
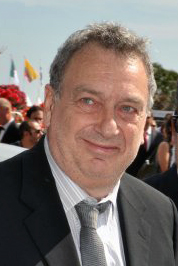
Award	Wins	Nominations
Academy Awards	0	2
Primetime Emmy Awards	1	5
Golden Globe Awards	0	1
BAFTA Awards	3	13
Total	4	21

Stephen Frears is an English director and producer. He has directed numerous acclaimed feature films since his debut in the early 1980s, such as My Beautiful Laundrette (1985), Dangerous Liaisons (1988), The Grifters (1990), High Fidelity (2000), The Queen (2006), Philomena (2013), Florence Foster Jenkins (2016), and Victoria & Abdul (2017). He has received two nominations for the Academy Award for Best Director.

Frears is also known for his work on various television programs, including Fail Safe (2000), The Deal (2003), Muhammad Ali's Greatest Fight (2013), A Very English Scandal (2018), State of the Union (2019), and Quiz (2020). He has received four Primetime Emmy Award nominations, with one win.

In 2008, The Daily Telegraph named Frears among the 100 most influential people in British culture.

== Major Awards ==
=== Academy Awards ===
Year	Category	Nominated work	Result	Ref.
1991	Best Director	The Grifters	Nominated	
2007	Best Director	The Queen	Nominated	

=== Primetime Emmy Awards ===
Year	Category	Nominated work	Result	Ref.
2000	Outstanding Directing for a Limited Series or Movie	Fail Safe	Nominated	
2014	Outstanding Directing for a Limited Series or Movie	Muhammad Ali's Greatest Fight	Nominated	
2019	Outstanding Directing for a Limited Series or Movie	A Very English Scandal	Nominated	
2019	Outstanding Short Form Comedy or Drama Series	State of the Union	Won	

=== Golden Globe Awards ===
Year	Category	Nominated work	Result	Ref.
2007	Best Director	The Queen	Nominated	

=== British Academy Film Awards ===
Year	Category	Nominated work	Result	Ref.
1990	Best Director	Dangerous Liaisons	Nominated	
2003	Outstanding British Film	Dirty Pretty Things	Nominated	
2007	Outstanding British Film	The Queen	Nominated	
2007	Best Director	The Queen	Nominated	
2014	Outstanding British Film	Philomena	Nominated	

=== British Academy Television Awards ===
Year	Category	Nominated work	Result	Ref.
1979	Best Single Play	Me! I'm Afraid of Virginia Woolf	Nominated	
1982	Best Single Play	BBC2 Playhouse: Going Gently	Won	
1983	Best Single Drama	Walter	Nominated	
1984	Best Single Drama	Saigon: Year of the Cat	Nominated	
1994	Best Single Drama	The Snapper	Nominated	
2004	Best Single Drama	The Deal	Won	
2019	Best Miniseries	A Very English Scandal	Nominated	
2019	Best Direction: Fiction	A Very English Scandal	Won	

== Other Awards ==
=== Directors Guild of America Awards ===
Year	Category	Nominated work	Result	Ref.
2000	Outstanding Directing - Miniseries or TV Film	Fail Safe	Nominated	
2006	Outstanding Directing - Feature Film	The Queen	Nominated	
2014	Outstanding Directing - Miniseries or TV Film	Muhammad Ali's Greatest Fight	Nominated	

=== Independent Spirit Awards ===
Year	Category	Nominated work	Result	Ref.
1987	Best International Film	Prick Up Your Ears	Nominated	

=== César Awards ===
Year	Category	Nominated work	Result	Ref.
1990	Best Foreign Film	Dangerous Liaisons	Won	
1994	Best Foreign Film	The Snapper	Nominated	
2006	Best Foreign Film	The Queen	Nominated	

=== British Independent Film Awards ===
Year	Category	Nominated work	Result	Ref.
2003	Best Director	Dirty Pretty Things	Won	
2005	Best Director	Mrs. Henderson Presents	Nominated	
2006	Best Director	The Queen	Nominated	

=== Evening Standard Film Awards ===
Year	Category	Nominated work	Result	Ref.
1986	Best Film	My Beautiful Laundrette	Won	
2003	Best Film	Dirty Pretty Things	Won	
2007	Special Award	—N/a	Won	

=== London Film Critics' Circle ===
Year	Category	Nominated work	Result	Ref.
2006	British Director of the Year	Mrs. Henderson Presents	Nominated	
2007	British Director of the Year	The Queen	Won	

=== Capri Hollywood International Film Festival ===
Year	Category	Nominated work	Result	Ref.
2016	Best European Director	Florence Foster Jenkins	Won	

== Festival Awards ==
=== Berlin Film Festival ===
Year	Category	Nominated work	Result	Ref.
1989	Berlinale Camera	—N/a	Won	
1996	Golden Bear	Mary Reilly	Nominated	
1999	Golden Bear	The Hi-Lo Country	Nominated	
1999	Silver Bear for Best Director	The Hi-Lo Country	Won	
2009	Golden Bear	Chéri	Nominated	

=== Cannes Film Festival ===
Year	Category	Nominated work	Result	Ref.
1987	Palme d'Or	Prick Up Your Ears	Nominated	
1996	Palme d'Or	The Van	Nominated	

=== Venice Film Festival ===
Year	Category	Nominated work	Result	Ref.
2000	Golden Lion	Liam	Nominated	
2000	OCIC Award	Liam	Won	
2002	Golden Lion	Dirty Pretty Things	Nominated	
2002	Sergio Trasatti Award	Dirty Pretty Things	Won	
2006	Golden Lion	The Queen	Nominated	
2006	FIPRESCI Prize	The Queen	Won	
2013	Golden Lion	Philomena	Nominated	
2013	Golden Mouse	Philomena	Won	
2013	Queer Lion	Philomena	Won	
2013	Brian Award	Philomena	Won	
2013	SIGNIS Award	Philomena	Won	
2013	Interfilm Award	Philomena	Won	
2013	UNICEF Award	Philomena	Won	
2013	Nazzareno Taddei Award	Philomena	Won	
2013	Vittorio Veneto Award	Philomena	Won	

=== Toronto Film Festival ===
Year	Category	Nominated work	Result	Ref.
1993	People's Choice Award	The Snapper	Won	
2013	People's Choice Award	Philomena	Nominated	
