= Ryan O'Connell =

American writer, LGBTQ and disability activist

- Born: September 2, 1986 (age 40)
- Education: The New School (BA)
- Occupations: Writer; actor; activist
- Known for: Special

Ryan O'Connell is an American writer, actor, director, comedian, LGBTQ activist, and disability advocate. He is known for his 2015 memoir, I'm Special: And Other Lies We Tell Ourselves, about his life as a gay man with cerebral palsy, which he adapted into television series Special for Netflix.

== Early life and education ==
O'Connell grew up in Ventura County, California with what he described as his "liberal" family. He has a mild form of cerebral palsy (CP) since birth, which affects the right side of his body with a noticeable limp. Because of his CP, he had ten or eleven surgeries as a child, spending time in the hospital, and received much physical therapy.

Growing up, O'Connell requested TV scripts for Christmas, and watched shows with the closed captioning on to learn more about writing. He would watch shows and attempt to figure out the A-Plot versus the B-plot, and the structure of the script. He loved performing as well, acting in all the middle-school and high-school plays. Later on he suppressed this desire, seeing himself not represented in popular culture. He attended Foothill Technology High School.

On discovering his sexuality, O'Connell said,

The moment I realized I was gay was—truly—[seeing] Ryan Phillippe's ass in Cruel Intentions. I remember seeing Ryan Phillippe's ass and being like, "That's the most beautiful thing I've ever seen in my life." And then being, like, "Oh, fuck me: I'm gay and disabled; this is so rude."

He remained closeted until he was 17 and felt he needed to come out, to pursue another boy who was already out. His family was supportive when he did; his sister, uncle, and grandfather had already identified as LGBTQ.

When O'Connell was 20, he was hit by a car and required four hand surgeries. The accident resulted in compartment syndrome, and affected mainly his left hand. Nine months later, he moved to New York City to attend The New School. There, peers assumed his limp was from the car accident, and he chose not to correct them. He described feeling in limbo about his CP, not really fitting in with disabled or non-disabled people. Additionally, disabled representation in popular culture was nearly non-existent.

== Career ==
=== Early career ===
O'Connell worked as a blogger for three years, first serving as editor of Thought Catalog in 2011. He contributed to Vice, BuzzFeed, and other publications including The New York Times and Medium. Some of his writing went viral and when he was 25, he was offered a book deal from Simon & Schuster. At the time, he kept his disability private. In 2015, he wrote a column for Thought Catalog called "Coming Out of the Disabled Closet" about hiding his disability with the car accident. He later expanded the article into his book, which he publicly revealed his disability. While writing the book, he moved to Los Angeles and at 27, started his television writing career with MTV's Awkward.

Just as his second season with Awkward wrapped in 2015, his memoir I'm Special: And Other Lies We Tell Ourselves was published. In April 2015, Jim Parsons, who had read O'Connell's Thought Catalog article, optioned the book through his company That's Wonderful Productions which he runs with husband Todd Spiewak. O'Connell was assured with Parsons and Spiewak; he felt he could not trust a network with the gay content, fearing that they would let the project die after buying the option. In late 2015, O'Connell was named to the Out100 honoring LGBTQ icons.

=== 2016 and Special ===
In 2016, O'Connell received a go-ahead from Stage 13 to develop a script for Special, based on his memoir, with eight 15-minute episodes for Netflix. The short-form format was taxing for the veteran script writer as there was no room for a C-plot alongside the A-Plot and B-plot, the writing also left no room, "every line needs to count for something and you can't do anything somewhere else." Special was all written on weekends, as he was writing full-time. In December 2016, he completed the writing but still had obstacles getting it produced because of the disability angle. He started doing media work for Special while writing full-time on BH90210, a Fox comedy-drama reboot of Beverly Hills, 90210 which debuted in August 2019. He noted it was hard to launch a show with a gay lead character, let alone one who was also disabled; a first for television. He stated, "I think Hollywood is largely not interested in disabled people because they don't view us as 'sexy' or 'cool'." He lamented, "1 in 4 people identify as disabled and there are only two shows (me and This Close) on the air from disabled people."

In Special, the lead character Ryan misleads his coworkers that his limp was the result of a car accident instead of his cerebral palsy. The show is largely based on O'Connell's life. He uses the show to "explore his own internalized ableism and insecurities of being in the gay community". A 2016 Ruderman Family Foundation study found that "about 95% of characters with disabilities on television are played by able-bodied actors". Including actors with disabilities is still rare in entertainment industries; in 2018 Ali Stroker was "the first person in a wheelchair to win a Tony Award"; in July 2019, Marvel made history announcing a deaf superhero, a first; and AMC's The Walking Dead and HBO's Years and Years are among the few opening their casting.

Although he looked for an actor, ultimately he took the role himself due to budget constraints. The eight-episode season was shot over 19 days. Producers filmed with Austin, Texas doubling for Los Angeles, also due to budget constraints. He found in particular the sex scenes were emotionally taxing but also rewarding as disabled people having sex is rarely seen, and among LGBTQ people even rarer. O'Connell also "set out to depict onscreen sex in an authentic way, something rarely shown with LGBTQ people". He said, "I also want to live in a world where it's not groundbreaking to show an accurate sex scene between two men." Special also shows the lead character Ryan losing his virginity to a male sex worker in what O'Connell characterized as "a beautifully honest and sweet sex scene". Digital Spy noted "it's probably the first-ever TV show to tackle gay, disabled sex with authenticity, while destigmatising sex work at the same time." USA Today called the episode a landmark for disability representation and noted "O'Connell hope(s) to destigmatize sex work with the graphic scene, but also normalize gay sex for mainstream audiences who aren't used to seeing it in Hollywood movies or popular TV shows". O'Connell and the show were commended for his "standout performance and quippy prose".

=== 2017 to present ===
O'Connell wrote for a season of Daytime Divas in 2017. He then worked as executive story editor on the 2017 reboot of Will & Grace, which taught him to keep stories grounded in the characters even if the action gets "wacky". Additionally, he was co-host of the seminal podcast Babe? with the iconic Lara Marie Schoenhals.

In May 2019, O'Connell was honored with the HRC Visibility Award by the Human Rights Campaign at the 2019 HRC Atlanta Gala Dinner. In June 2019, O'Connell was the celebrity grand marshal for the LA Pride Parade. That month, Queerty named him one of the Pride 50 "trailblazing individuals who actively ensure society remains moving towards equality, acceptance and dignity for all queer people."

In July 2019, Special was nominated for four 71st Primetime Emmy Awards taking place in September: Outstanding Short Form Comedy or Drama Series; both Punam Patel and Jessica Hecht for Outstanding Actress in a Short Form Comedy or Drama Series; and O'Connell for Outstanding Actor in a Short Form Comedy or Drama Series. This is the most nominations for a short form piece this year.

In August 2019, it was announced that O'Connell and Anna Dokoza, an Australian director and producer who worked on Special, as well as Flight of the Conchords, and Lady Dynamite, will be mentoring prospective producers in Australia. The effort, sponsored by SBS and Screen Australia, will launch Digital Originals, to make short-form projects for SBS On Demand.

In June 2022, O'Connell had his fiction debut with the book Just by looking at him, also published by Simon & Schuster in New York.

== Personal life ==
O'Connell has been dating Jonathan Parks-Ramage since 2015. They met at Grimes' birthday party in Los Angeles.

== Filmography ==
=== Television ===
Year	Title	Creator	Writer	Executive producer	Actor	Role	Notes
2014–16	Awkward	No	Yes	No	No		
2017–18	Will & Grace	No	Executive story editor	No	No		
2019–21	Special	Yes	Yes	Yes	Yes	Ryan Hayes	Main role
2021	The Baby-Sitters Club	No	Yes	Supervising	No		
2022	Queer as Folk	No	Yes	Co-executive	Yes	Julian Beaumont	Main role
