= Megan Amram =

American comedian and writer

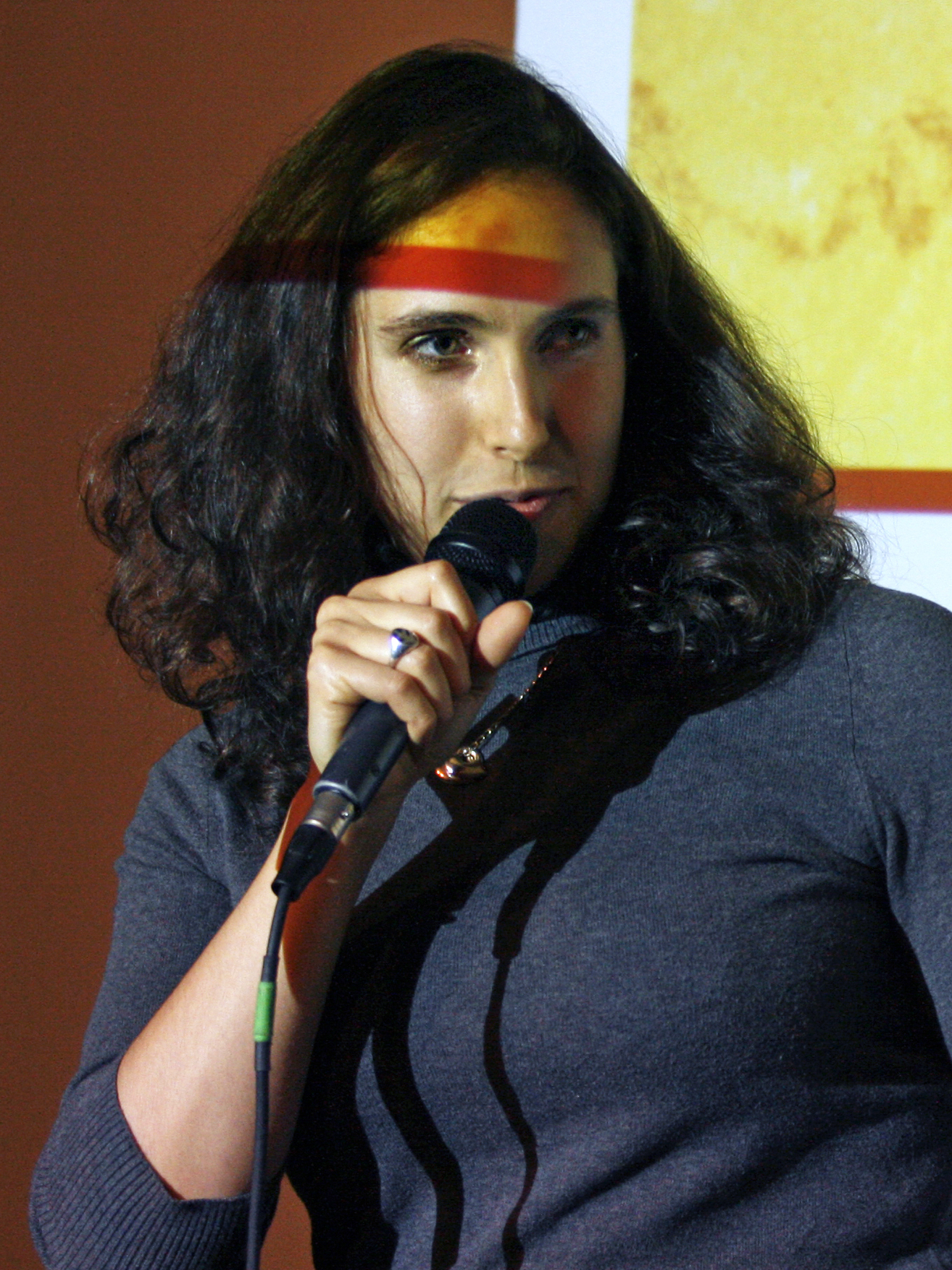
- Amram in 2012
- Born: September 3, 1987 (age 39); Portland, Oregon, U.S.
- Education: Harvard University
- Notable work: An Emmy for Megan; The Good Place

Comedy career
- Medium: Television; internet
- Genres: Alternative comedy; surreal comedy; dark humor
- Website: anemmyformegan.com

Megan Amram (born September 3, 1987) is an American comedy writer, producer, and performer. She is most known for her work as co-writer and producer for the NBC series The Good Place. Amram created and starred in the comedy web series, An Emmy for Megan, which depicts Amram's quest to win an Emmy.

== Early life and education ==
Amram was born and raised in Portland, Oregon, and is Jewish. She was educated at Catlin Gabel School and Harvard University where she graduated in 2010. While at Harvard, Amram wrote two of the Hasty Pudding Theatricals' comedy drag shows with her roommate and writing partner Alexandra Petri. She studied violin for twenty years, and appeared as a violinist in an October 2018 episode of The Good Place, a sitcom on which she was a staff writer.

== Career ==
Amram was a writer on the Amazon series Transparent, HBO's Silicon Valley, and the final three seasons of the NBC comedy Parks and Recreation. Other credits include writing for Adult Swim's Childrens Hospital, Fox's The Simpsons, Comedy Central's Kroll Show, the 83rd and 90th Academy Awards, the 2012 MTV Movie Awards, the Disney Channel and contributing to Funny Or Die and the Comedy Central Roasts. Her writing has appeared in The New Yorker, McSweeney's, Vulture, Vice Magazine and The Awl, among others, and her first book Science... For Her! was published in November 2015 by Simon & Schuster.

Amram has occasionally ventured into acting, with a 2011 appearance on RuPaul's Drag U, and on The CW musical comedy series Crazy Ex-Girlfriend in an episode titled "I Need Some Balance" in January 2019.

In 2018, Amram created, directed, wrote, and starred in the comedy web series, An Emmy for Megan, which depicts her quest to win an Emmy Award by meeting the minimum standards to qualify for an Emmy nomination in the Outstanding Actress in a Short Form Comedy or Drama Series category. The first series was nominated for two Emmy Awards, one in the Outstanding Short Form Comedy or Drama Series category and one in the Outstanding Actress in a Short Form Comedy or Drama Series category for Amram. The second series was released in May 2019 and was nominated for two Emmy Awards: one in the Outstanding Actress in a Short Form Comedy or Drama Series category and one, for Patton Oswalt, in the Outstanding Actor in a Short Form Comedy or Drama Series category.

== Personal life ==
Amram lives in Los Angeles. In 2019, Amram and other WGA writers fired their agents as part of the WGA's stand against the ATA and the practice of packaging.

In June 2020, tweets resurfaced of Amram making anti-Semitic, homophobic, and anti-Asian American jokes. Amram later apologized in a statement, saying: "I am speaking from the heart and trying my best to communicate my sincere regret. I am deeply embarrassed and more apologetic than you can ever know."

== Filmography ==
=== Television ===
Year	Title	Writer	Producer	Actor	Notes
2011	83rd Academy Awards	Yes	No	No	
2011	RuPaul's Drag U	No	No	Yes	Episode: "Like a Virgin" as contestant Smokey St. James (Episode Winner)
2011–2012	A.N.T. Farm	Yes	No	No	Writer – 1 episode Staff writer – 6 episodes
2012	2012 MTV Movie Awards	Yes	No	No	
2012–2015	Parks and Recreation	Yes	No	Yes	Writer – 5 episodes Actor – Episode: "The Cones of Dunshire" as Viv
2013	Kroll Show	Yes	No	No	8 episodes
2013	Sketchy	Yes	No	No	Episode: "Birth Control on the Bottom"
2015–2016	Childrens Hospital	Yes	No	No	3 episodes
2015–2016	The Adventures of OG Sherlock Kush	No	No	Yes	Episode: "The Deadly Brothel" as Jaclyn Ripper; Episode: "The Mystery of the Royal Flasher" as The Queen
2016	Silicon Valley	Yes	Yes	No	Writer – Episode: "The Empty Chair"; Co-producer – 10 episodes
2016–2020	The Good Place	Yes	Yes	Yes	Producer – 13 episodes Supervising producer – 12 episodes Writer – 7 episodes Actor – Episode: "Jeremy Bearimy" as Violinist
2018	90th Academy Awards	Yes	No	No	
2018–2019	An Emmy for Megan	Yes	Executive	Yes	Creator; Director – 12 episodes
2018-2022	The Simpsons	Yes	Consulting	No	Writer – Episodes: "Bart vs. Itchy & Scratchy", "Crystal Blue-Haired Persuasion" and "Marge the Meanie"; Consulting producer – 17 episodes
2019	Crazy Ex-Girlfriend	No	No	Yes	Episode: "I Need Some Balance" as Nostalgia Cat
2020	A Parks and Recreation Special	Yes	No	No	
2021	Q-Force	Yes	Consulting	No	Writer - Episode: "Deb's BBQ"
2021	Santa Inc.	No	No	Yes	Episode: "Santa's Birthday" as Heartbreaking Lisp/ER Nurse/ Gummy Mermaids
2022	Pitch Perfect: Bumper in Berlin	Yes	Executive	No	Co-Developer; Writer - Episode: "Backpfeifengesicht"
2024-2025	A Man on the Inside	Yes	Consulting	Yes	Actress - Episode: "Tinker Tailor Older Spy" as Jessica Lady; Writer - Episode: "Spirit Week"
2024	A Nonsense Christmas with Sabrina Carpenter	Yes	No	No	
2025	Poker Face	Yes	No	No	Episode: "The Sleazy Georgian"

== Awards and nominations ==
Year	Association	Category	Nominated work	Result	Ref.
2013	Writers Guild of America Awards	Comedy Series	Parks and Recreation	Nominated	
2014	Writers Guild of America Awards	Comedy Series	Parks and Recreation	Nominated	
2016	Writers Guild of America Awards	Comedy Series	Silicon Valley	Nominated	
2018	Writers Guild of America Awards	Comedy Series	The Good Place	Nominated	
2018	Primetime Emmy Awards	Outstanding Short Form Comedy or Drama Series	An Emmy for Megan	Nominated	
2018	Primetime Emmy Awards	Outstanding Actress in a Short Form Comedy or Drama Series	An Emmy for Megan	Nominated	
2019	Golden Globe Awards	Best Television Series – Musical or Comedy	The Good Place	Nominated	
2019	Hugo Award	Hugo Award for Best Dramatic Presentation	The Good Place	Nominated	
2019	Gold Derby Award	Outstanding Comedy Series	The Good Place	Nominated	
2019	Primetime Emmy Awards	Outstanding Short Form Comedy or Drama Series	An Emmy for Megan	Nominated	
2019	Primetime Emmy Awards	Outstanding Comedy Series	The Good Place	Nominated	
2020	Primetime Emmy Awards	Outstanding Comedy Series	The Good Place	Nominated	

== Bibliography ==
- Amram, Megan (November 7, 2016). "Trump's American Girl Dolls". Shouts & Murmurs. The New Yorker. 92 (36): 27.
- — (May 25, 2017). "Eulogy for America". Daily Shouts. The New Yorker.
- — (September 11, 2017). "Jared Kushner's Harvard Admissions Essay". Shouts & Murmurs. The New Yorker.
- — (April 30, 2018). "Captain's Log". Shouts & Murmurs. The New Yorker.
- — (November 2, 2020). "Goop Coronavirus Guide". Shouts & Murmurs. The New Yorker.
- — (August 22, 2022). "The Tesla Body". Shouts & Murmurs. The New Yorker. 98 (25): 23. (Note: Title in the online table of contents is "Elon Musk's new frontier : your body".)

———————
