= Primetime Emmy Award for Outstanding Short Form Comedy or Drama Series =

Television award category

- Awarded for: Outstanding Short Form Comedy or Drama Series
- Country: United States
- Presented by: Academy of Television Arts & Sciences
- First award: 2016 (awarded to Childrens Hospital)
- Final award: 2020 (awarded to Better Call Saul Employee Training: Legal Ethics With Kim Wexler)
- Website: emmys.com

This is a list of winners and nominees of the Primetime Emmy Award for Outstanding Short Form Comedy or Drama Series. The category was initiated in 2016 alongside Outstanding Short Form Variety Series and Outstanding Short Form Nonfiction or Reality Series. The awards replaced the now-retired category for Outstanding Short-Format Live-Action Entertainment Program. In 2021, this award was merged Short Form Variety Series to form the Primetime Emmy Award for Outstanding Short Form Comedy, Drama or Variety Series. These awards were not presented at the Primetime Emmy Awards show, but at the Creative Arts Emmy Award show.

== Winners and nominations ==
indicates the winner

=== 2010s ===
| Year | Program | Producers | Network |
|---|---|---|---|
2016 (68th)
| 2016 (68th) | Childrens Hospital | Rob Corddry, Jonathan Stern, David Wain, Keith Crofford and Mike Lazzo, executive producers; Krister Johnson, co-executive producer | Adult Swim |
| 2016 (68th) | Fear the Walking Dead: Flight 462 | Troy Miller, Dave Erickson and David Wiener, executive producers; Tally Barr, producer | AMC |
| 2016 (68th) | Hack Into Broad City | Abbi Jacobson, Ilana Glazer, Tony Hernandez and Lilly Burns, executive producers; Ryan McCormick, producer | ComedyCentral.com |
| 2016 (68th) | Her Story | Katherine Reed Fisher, executive producer/producer; Eve Ensler, executive producer; Jen Richards and Laura Zak, co-executive producers | YouTube |
| 2016 (68th) | UnREAL: The Auditions | Tamara Kaiser and Christian Martin, executive producers | Lifetime |
2017 (69th)
| 2017 (69th) | Los Pollos Hermanos Employee Training | Dan Appel, Vince Gilligan, Peter Gould, Ariel Levine and Melissa Bernstein, executive producers; Rob Knox, producer | AMC |
| 2017 (69th) | Brown Girls | Sam Bailey and Fatimah Asghar, producers | OpenTV |
| 2017 (69th) | Fear the Walking Dead: Passage | Dave Erickson, Frank Scherma and Justin Wilkes, executive producers; Andrew Bernstein, producer | AMC.com |
| 2017 (69th) | Hack Into Broad City | Abbi Jacobson, Ilana Glazer, Tony Hernandez and Lilly Burns, executive producers; Kelsie Kiley, producer | ComedyCentral.com |
| 2017 (69th) | Marvel's Agents of S.H.I.E.L.D.: Slingshot | Geoffrey Colo, Jed Whedon, Maurissa Tancharoen, Jeffrey Bell, Jeph Loeb and Joe Quesada, executive producers | ABCd / ABC.com |
2018 (70th)
| 2018 (70th) | James Corden's Next James Corden | Ben Winston, Rob Crabbe, James Corden, Adam Abramson, Ryan McKee, executive producers; David Lamattina, producer | CBS on Snapchat |
| 2018 (70th) | aka Wyatt Cenac | Wyatt Cenac, executive producer; Chris Marsh and Daniel Goldberg, producers | Topic.com |
| 2018 (70th) | An Emmy for Megan | Megan Amram, Dave Kneebone and Janel Kranking, executive producers; Joseph Carnegie, producer | anemmyformegan.com |
| 2018 (70th) | Grey's Anatomy: B Team | Abby Chambers, executive producer; Val Cheung, producer; Produced by Mohamed Saad Mansoor | abc.go.com |
| 2018 (70th) | The Walking Dead: Red Machete | Alex Coley Brown, Noam Dromi, Jay Williams, executive producers; Nick Bernardone and Avi Youabian, producers | AMC.com |
2019 (71st)
| 2019 (71st) | State of the Union (Note: In 2019, the AMC series Better Call Saul Employee Training: Madrigal Electromotive Security was nominated. The nomination was rescinded after it was determined that several episodes were shorter than two minutes, violating the TV Academy's rule that six episodes air during the eligibility period with a runtime of at least two minutes. Sixth place finisher State of the Union became the fifth nominee, going on to win the category.) | Nick Hornby, Stephen Frears, Jamie Laurenson, Hakan Kousetta, Iain Canning and Emile Sherman, executive producers | Sundance |
| 2019 (71st) | An Emmy for Megan | Megan Amram, Janel Kranking and Dave Kneebone, executive producers; Joseph Carnegie, producer | anemmyformegan.com |
| 2019 (71st) | Hack Into Broad City | Tony Hernandez, Lilly Burns, Abbi Jacobson and Ilana Glazer, executive producers; Kelsie Kiley, co-executive producer; Nick Paley, producer | ComedyCentral.com |
| 2019 (71st) | It's Bruno! | Solvan "Slick" Naim, executive producer; Molly Conners, Amanda Bowers and Vincent Morano, producers | Netflix |
| 2019 (71st) | Special | Jim Parsons, Todd Spiewak, Eric Norsoph, Ryan O'Connell and Anna Dokoza, executive producers | Netflix |

=== 2020s ===
| Year | Program | Producers | Network |
|---|---|---|---|
2020 (72nd)
| 2020 (72nd) | Better Call Saul Employee Training: Legal Ethics With Kim Wexler | Dan Appel, Vince Gilligan, Peter Gould, Ariel Levine and Melissa Bernstein, executive producers; James Heth, producer | AMC.com |
| 2020 (72nd) | The Good Place Presents: The Selection | Michael Schur, Morgan Sackett and David Hyman, executive producers; Eric Kissack, Matt Quezada and Doug Smith, producers | NBC |
| 2020 (72nd) | Most Dangerous Game | Nick Santora, Gero Bauknecht, Gerd Schepers, Gordon Gray, Liam Hemsworth and Phil Abraham, executive producers | Quibi |
| 2020 (72nd) | Reno 911! | Thomas Lennon, Robert Ben Garant, Kerri Kenney-Silver, John Landgraf and Peter Principato, executive producers; David Lincoln, producer | Quibi |
| 2020 (72nd) | Star Trek: Short Treks | Alex Kurtzman, Heather Kadin, Olatunde Osunsanmi, Frank Siracusa and John Weber, executive producers; Aaron Baiers, co-executive producer | CBS All Access |

== Programs with multiple awards ==
Totals include wins for Outstanding Short Form Comedy, Drama or Variety Series.

3 awards

- Childrens Hospital

2 awards

- Between Two Ferns with Zach Galifianakis

== Programs with multiple nominations ==
Totals include nominations for Outstanding Short Form Comedy, Drama or Variety Series.

5 nominations

- Childrens Hospital

3 nominations

- Between Two Ferns with Zach Galifianakis
- Hack Into Broad City
- The Daily Show: Correspondents Explain
- 30 Rock: The Webisodes

2 nominations

- An Emmy for Megan

== Total awards by network ==
- AMC – 2
- Adult Swim – 1
- CBS on Snapchat – 1
- Sundance – 1
