= Sydnee Washington =

American comedian

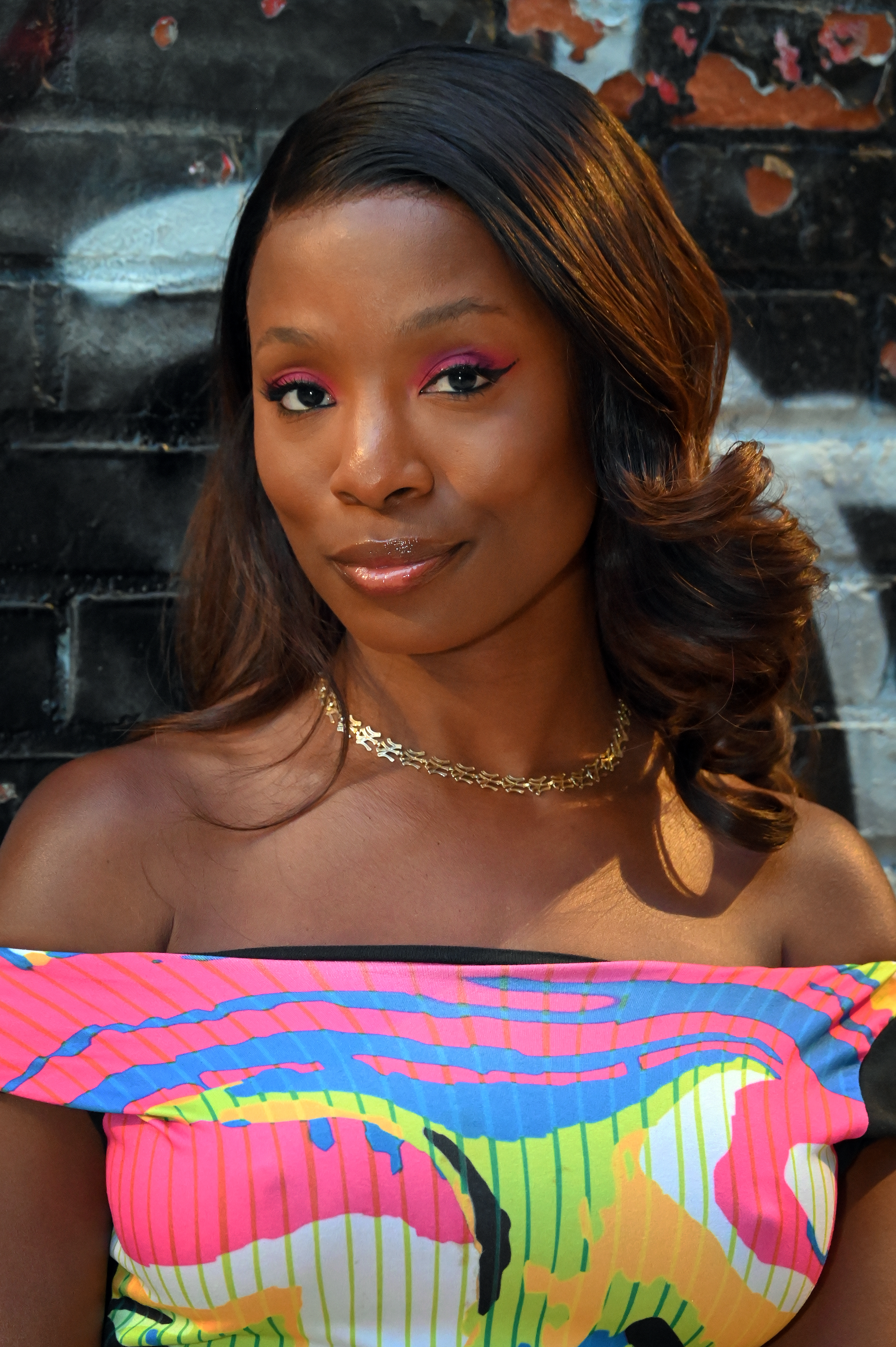
- Washington in 2025
- Born: February 2, 1989 (age 37); Brooklyn, New York, New York, USA
- Notable work: The Unofficial Expert (podcast)

Comedy career
- Years active: 2013 – present
- Medium: Stand-up, television, podcast

Sydnee Washington is an American comedian, actress, model, and podcaster. She appeared on Comedy Central's Up Next showcase in 2018. Washington co-hosted the comedy podcast The Unofficial Expert with Marie Faustin. Their latest podcast Mess premiered in 2024. Her work has been highlighted in The New York Times, Time Out, New York Post, and W.

== Career ==
Washington at the 2026 Edinburgh Festival Fringe

Washington pursued comedy based on a friend's recommendation. Working at a high-end cocktail lounge she would frequently banter with customers. Her friend filmed several of the bits and edited them into a reel to convince Washington to pursue comedy. She first performed stand-up in 2013.

She gained wider prominence after she appeared in Comedy Central's 2018 Up Next showcase. That year she also hosted Death of a Bottle Girl, a one-woman show that was called "hilarious" by Time Out.

With Marie Faustin and Aminah Imani, she co-hosted the Sunday night Knitting Factory comedy showcase originally started by comedian Hannibal Burress. She also co-hosted the comedy podcast The Unofficial Expert with Faustin, where the two interviewed experts from various fields and shared their own life experiences. The podcast was recommended by Vulture.

In 2020, due to social distancing requirements related to COVID-19, Washington no longer had the option of performing live stand-up. She began hosting a weekly Instagram Live show called Syd Can Cook to have a consistent platform to perform for an audience. She is assisted in person by her friend Karolena Greenidge, and they go live with various comedians who attempt to assist Washington follow a recipe, like chicken tikka masala and shrimp scampi.

Washington is also a model.

In 2021, she started the podcast Hobby Hunter, featuring guests including Caleb Hearon and Shelby Wolstein, who discuss "the hobbies that have brought them joy over the years." It has since ended.

In 2024, Sydnee and Marie reunited for the podcast Mess on the Big Money Players Network.

== Personal life ==
Washington was born in Brooklyn, where she currently resides. She spent her childhood in Oakland and moved back to Brooklyn when she was 13. Washington graduated from Clark University.

Washington is a lesbian and began to identify as such during adulthood. She remarked that many people are skeptical of her sexuality due to her femme presentation. About Hollywood she told Paper: "At least they know what a gay male actor is supposed to be...For somebody like me, they're like, 'Gay isn't believable, you have rhinestones on.'"

== Awards and nominations ==
- 2022 – Nominee, Primetime Emmy Award for Outstanding Actress in a Short Form Comedy or Drama Series (for Bridesman)
- 2023 – Winner, Writers Guild of America Award for Television: Comedy/Variety Sketch Series (for Inside Amy Schumer)
