= Special (TV series) =

American comedy streaming television series

- Genre: Comedy, LGBTQ
- Created by: Ryan O'Connell
- Based on: I'm Special: And Other Lies We Tell Ourselves by Ryan O'Connell
- Starring: Ryan O'Connell; Jessica Hecht; Punam Patel; Marla Mindelle; Augustus Prew; Patrick Fabian; Max Jenkins; Brian Jordan Alvarez
- Composer: Joshua Moshier
- Country of origin: United States
- Original language: English
- No. of seasons: 2
- No. of episodes: 16

Production
- Executive producers: Anna Dokoza; Eric Norsoph; Ryan O'Connell; Todd Spiewak; Jim Parsons
- Cinematography: Philip Roy; Nate Miller; Jeremy Mackie
- Editors: Thomas Calderón; Luis Colina; Taichi Erskine; John Daigle
- Camera setup: Single-camera
- Running time: 12–34 minutes
- Production companies: Warner Bros. Television; That's Wonderful Productions; Campfire; Stage 13

Original release
- Network: Netflix
- Release: April 12, 2019 – May 20, 2021

Special is an American comedy-drama television series created by Ryan O'Connell for Netflix. Starring Ryan O'Connell, the series is a semi-autobiographical account of his life as a gay man in Los Angeles with cerebral palsy pursuing new friendships, relationships, and self-sufficiency.

It is based on O'Connell's memoir I'm Special: And Other Lies We Tell Ourselves.

The series premiered on April 12, 2019, and concluded on May 20, 2021, after two seasons. It received positive reviews and earned four nominations at the 71st Primetime Creative Arts Emmy Awards, one for Outstanding Short Form Comedy or Drama Series and three for the performances of Ryan, Jessica Hecht, and Punam Patel.

== Synopsis ==
Special is an LGBTQ series about a gay man, Ryan, with mild cerebral palsy who decides to rewrite his identity and chase his dreams.

== Cast and characters ==
=== Main ===
- Ryan O'Connell as Ryan Hayes, an unpaid intern at Eggwoke
- Jessica Hecht as Karen Hayes, Ryan's mother
- Punam Patel as Kim Laghari, Ryan's friend and co-worker at Eggwoke
- Marla Mindelle as Olivia, Ryan and Kim's boss
- Augustus Prew as Carey, one of Kim's best friends.
- Patrick Fabian as Phil, Karen's new neighbor and love interest
- Max Jenkins as Tanner (season 2), Ryan's love interest who is in an open relationship with a man named Richard

=== Recurring ===
- Gina Marie Hughes as Samantha, Ryan and Kim's co-worker at Eggwoke
- Buck Andrews as Henry (season 2), a neurodivergent love interest of Ryan

=== Guest stars ===
- Kat Rogers as Caitie
- Jason Michael Snow as Keaton
- Brian Jordan Alvarez as Shay
- Shalita Grant as Rae
- Charlie Barnett as Harrison (season 2), Kim's love interest. He comes from a poor and difficult background. After the sale of his company he becomes quite wealthy but it comes with a struggle with his family, who wants part of his money.
- Ana Ortiz as Susan (season 2), Phil's new girlfriend
- Utkarsh Ambudkar as Ravi (season 2), a childhood friend and romantic interest of Kim
- Lauren Weedman as Tonya (season 2), a longtime friend of Karen
- Anjali Bhimani as Bina Laghari (season 2), Kim's mother
- Ajay Mehta as Vijay Laghari (season 2), Kim's father
- Karan Soni as Dev Laghari (season 2), Kim's brother
- Leslie Jordan as Charles (season 2)
- Jeremy Glazer as Marc Miller (season 2), second love interest of Ryan

== Episodes ==
Season	Episodes	Originally released
1	8	April 12, 2019
2	8	May 20, 2021

=== Season 1 (2019) ===
No. overall	No. in season	Title	Directed by	Written by	Original release date
1	1	"Chapter One: Cerebral LOLzy"	Anna Dokoza	Ryan O'Connell	April 12, 2019
Ryan, a gay man with mild cerebral palsy, begins his internship at Eggwoke, an online content creation company. He becomes friends with his coworker Kim. Everyone at his workplace assumes his symptoms of his cerebral palsy is due to a car accident, which he decides to play along with.
2	2	"Chapter Two: The Deep End"	Anna Dokoza	Ryan O'Connell	April 12, 2019
Ryan and Kim go to their boss’s poolside birthday party. Ryan recognizes one of the guests from Grindr and they leave to have sex, but Ryan’s inexperience ends the encounter early. Meanwhile, some of the guests make passive-aggressive comments about Kim’s body to Kim. Returning home, Ryan tells his overprotective mother, Karen, that he’s moving out.
3	3	"Chapter Three: Free Scones"	Anna Dokoza	Ryan O'Connell	April 12, 2019
Kim encourages Ryan to meet a sex worker, Shay, to lose his virginity. Though it is initially awkward, Ryan relaxes and has an enjoyable time with Shay. Karen agrees to help Ryan find an apartment. Phil, the new neighbor, catches Karen staring at him and invites her to a date.
4	4	"Chapter Four: Housechilling Party"	Anna Dokoza	Ryan O'Connell	April 12, 2019
Ryan invites his old college friends to a housewarming party to celebrate his new apartment. They all bail on him, so he invites Kim over and lies that the party was meant for her. She calls him out on the lie, and they promise not to lie to each other in their friendship. Kim invites her friends over and they all dance happily. Karen and Phil meet and have sex.
5	5	"Chapter Five: Vagina Momologues"	Anna Dokoza	Ryan O'Connell	April 12, 2019
Karen struggles to maintain relationships with her mother and Ryan. She buys a new dress to impress Phil.
6	6	"Chapter Six: Straight Potential"	Anna Dokoza	Ryan O'Connell	April 12, 2019
Ryan meets Kim's friend Carey and realizes he is in love with him. Carey invites him to a poker game and discreetly helps Ryan shuffle his cards, which Ryan is thankful for. Unfortunately, Ryan learns that Carey already has a boyfriend. At Phil's encouragement, Karen takes pot and admits to him how grateful she feels to love someone who cares for her.
7	7	"Chapter Seven: Blind Deaf Date"	Anna Dokoza	Ryan O'Connell	April 12, 2019
Ryan's boss sets Ryan on a date with her deaf cousin, which doesn't work out. Ryan is shocked to discover that Karen and Phil are dating. Phil breaks up with Karen due to her strong attachment to Ryan. Karen tells Ryan that she broke up with Phil, and is surprised to hear that he accepted their relationship and just needed time to process. Ryan and Karen reconcile.
8	8	"Chapter Eight: Gay Gardens"	Anna Dokoza	Ryan O'Connell	April 12, 2019
It is Karen's 50th birthday and she asks Ryan to pick up a cake for her. Karen attempts to get back with Phil by telling him that Ryan approves of their relationship, but Phil declines, saying he doesn't want to need his approval to date her. At work, Ryan comes clean and admits that his limp is due to his cerebral palsy, not the car accident as everyone assumed. No one cares except for Kim, who Ryan apologizes to for lying again. Ryan gets distracted hanging out with his friends and comes late to Karen and brings the wrong cake. This sets off an argument between them: Karen tells Ryan that she ended her relationship with Phil because of him, but he says he never wanted that; Ryan says that Karen is too dependent on him, but Karen says that he can't survive in the real world without her. Karen tries to apologize for what she said, but Ryan leaves.

=== Season 2 (2021) ===
No. overall	No. in season	Title	Directed by	Written by	Original release date
9	1	"One Day Stand"	Anna Dokoza	Ryan O'Connell	May 20, 2021
10	2	"I Don't Like it Like This"	Anna Dokoza	Mason Flink	May 20, 2021
11	3	"That's The Way The Boys Are"	Anna Dokoza	Liz Elverenli	May 20, 2021
12	4	"Death By a Thousand Cold Cuts"	Anna Dokoza	Leila Cohan	May 20, 2021
13	5	"Ryan Joins the Crips"	Craig Johnson	Keshni Kashyap	May 20, 2021
14	6	"Prom Queens"	Craig Johnson	Leila Cohan	May 20, 2021
15	7	"Why Is No One Ready?"	Craig Johnson	Ryan O'Connell	May 20, 2021
16	8	"Here's Where the Story Ends"	Craig Johnson	Ryan O'Connell	May 20, 2021

== Production ==
=== Development ===
On February 5, 2019, Netflix announced that it had given the production a series order for an eight-episode first season. The series is created by Ryan O'Connell, who is credited as an executive producer, alongside Jim Parsons, Anna Dokoza, Eric Norsoph and Todd Spiewak. Production companies involved with the series were slated to consist of That's Wonderful Productions and Stage 13. On December 16, 2019, the series was renewed for a second and final season by Netflix.

=== Casting ===
Alongside the series order announcement, it was confirmed that Ryan O'Connell, Jessica Hecht, Punam Patel, Marla Mindelle, Augustus Prew, and Patrick Fabian would star in the series. In February 2020, Max Jenkins was cast in the recurring role for the second season. In March 2021, Charlie Barnett, Ana Ortiz, Utkarsh Ambudkar, Lauren Weedman, Buck Andrews, Anjali Bhimani, Ajay Mehta, and Karan Soni joined the cast in recurring roles while Leslie Jordan was cast to guest star.

== Release ==
On March 25, 2019, Netflix released the first official trailer for the series. The first season, consisting of 8 episodes, was released on Netflix on April 12, 2019. The second season was released on May 20, 2021.

== Reception ==
=== Critical response ===
The first season received positive reviews upon its release. On review aggregator Rotten Tomatoes, the series holds an approval rating of 96% with an average rating of 7.30/10 based on 25 reviews. The website's critical consensus reads, "Honest and genuinely affecting, Special lives up to its name with a funny—if a bit too concise—first season brightened by Ryan O'Connell's infectious charms. Alternatively, some critics on Rotten Tomatoes compared the show to a "woke, sappy millennial dream". On Metacritic, it has a weighted average score of 66 out of 100, based on 9 critics, indicating "generally favorable reviews". Variety gave the show a positive review calling the main character "quick and snarky, deeply insecure and sometimes more selfish than he's willing to admit. He makes mistakes and pays for them, undergoing a hell of a lot of change in the short time Special gets to show it." TV Guide gave the show a mixed review saying that, "Hopefully Special gets a second season with a bigger budget, a writing staff, and more time to plan. The way Season 1 improves as it goes along shows Special still has a lot of potential."

=== Accolades ===
Year	Award	Category	Nominee(s)	Result	Ref.
2019	Primetime Emmy Awards	Outstanding Short Form Comedy or Drama Series	Jim Parsons, Todd Spiewak, Eric Norsoph, Ryan O'Connell and Anna Dokoza	Nominated	
2019	Primetime Emmy Awards	Outstanding Actor in a Short Form Comedy or Drama Series	Ryan O'Connell	Nominated	
2019	Primetime Emmy Awards	Outstanding Actress in a Short Form Comedy or Drama Series	Jessica Hecht	Nominated	
2019	Primetime Emmy Awards	Outstanding Actress in a Short Form Comedy or Drama Series	Punam Patel	Nominated	
2020	Writers Guild of America Awards	Short Form New Media – Original	Ryan O'Connell	Won	
2022	GLAAD Media Awards	Outstanding Comedy Series	Special	Nominated	
