= Jessica Hecht =

American actress (born 1965)

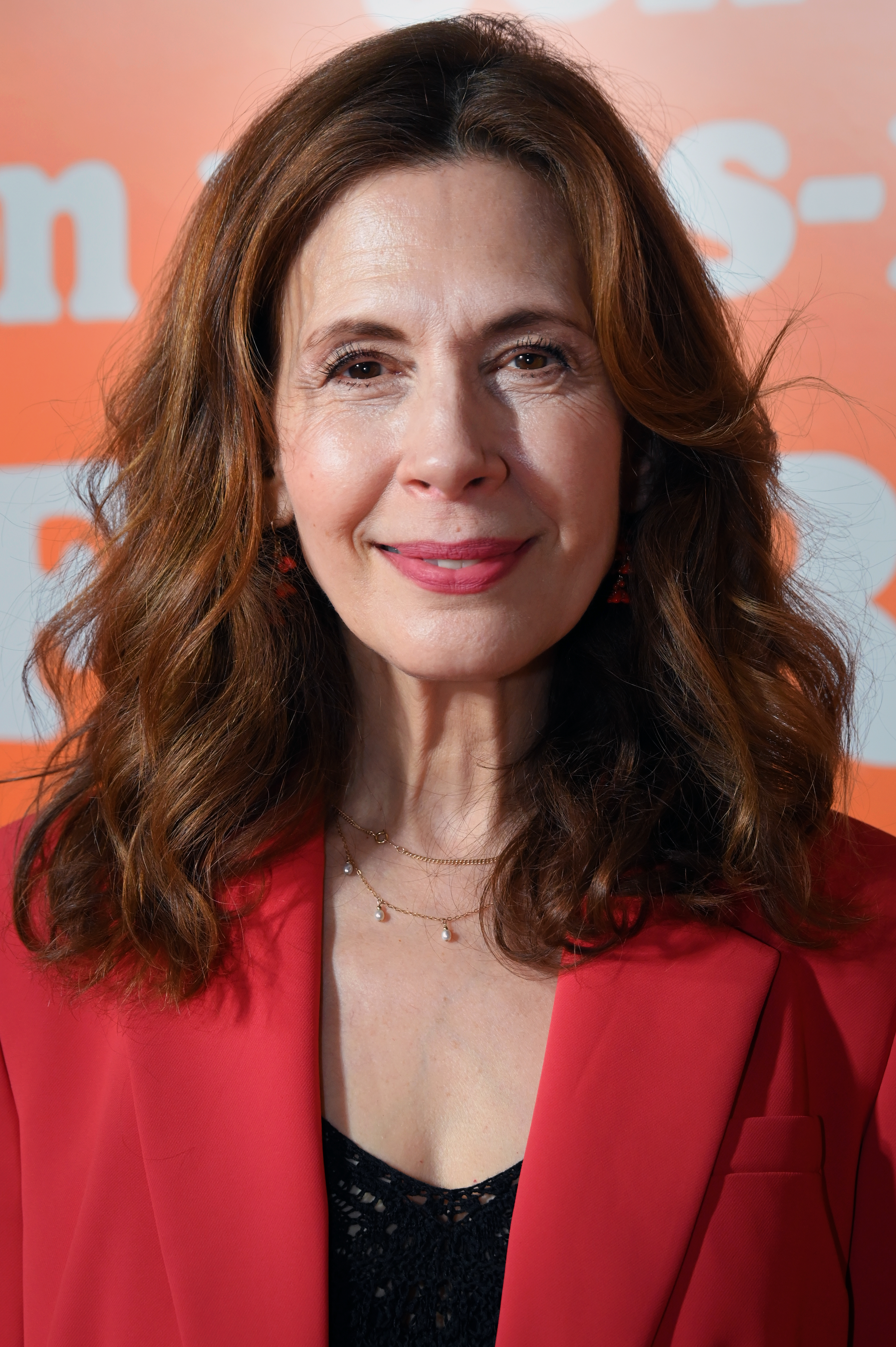
- Hecht in 2026
- Born: June 28, 1965 (age 61); Princeton, New Jersey, U.S.
- Education: New York University (BFA)
- Occupation: Actress
- Years active: 1990–present
- Spouse: Adam Bernstein (m. 1995)
- Children: 2

Jessica Hecht (born June 28, 1965) is an American actress known for her roles as Gretchen Schwartz on Breaking Bad, Susan Bunch on Friends, Carol Mannheim on The Boys, and Karen on Special, for which she was nominated for a Primetime Emmy Award. She is also known for her work on Broadway, earning Tony Award nominations for her roles in A View from the Bridge (2010), Summer, 1976 (2023), and Eureka Day (2025).

== Early life and education ==
Hecht was born in Princeton, New Jersey. When she was three, she moved with her parents and sister to Bloomfield, Connecticut. After her parents divorced, her mother married psychiatrist Howard Iger, and they raised Jessica and her sisters Elizabeth and Andrea, and her brother, Russell. Hecht attended Connecticut College for a year and a half before graduating from the New York University Tisch School of the Arts in 1987 with a Bachelor of Fine Arts in drama.

Hecht was raised in a culturally Jewish family, with a secular socialist father, but nonetheless expressed interest in religion and had a bat mitzvah. She has stated that she is Reconstructionist Jewish and "fairly spiritual".

== Career ==
Hecht has appeared in numerous television series, including Dickinson, Bored to Death, Red Oaks, Jessica Jones, The Loudest Voice, and Succession. In 2020 she played Sonya Barzel on The Sinner, and was nominated for the Emmy Award for Outstanding Actress in a Short Form Series in 2019 for her role as Karen in the Netflix series Special. She is known for her roles as Gretchen Schwartz on Breaking Bad (5 episodes) and Susan Bunch, the wife of Ross Geller's ex-wife Carol Willick, on Friends (12 episodes). She was also a featured cast member in the Jonathan Silverman sitcom The Single Guy.

Hecht had the supporting role of Amy Burns in the comedy drama film Dan in Real Life (2007), with Steve Carell and Juliette Binoche. She also appeared in Whatever Works, Sideways, and A Beautiful Day in the Neighborhood.

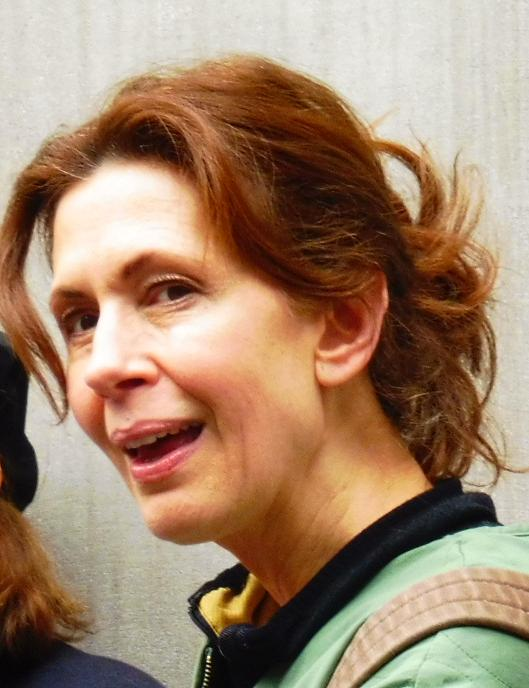
Hecht in 2023 outside the Samuel J. Friedman Theatre, Broadway

At the 2010 Tony Awards, she was nominated for the Tony Award for Best Featured Actress in a Play, for her role in A View from the Bridge. In 2012, she performed on Broadway with Jim Parsons in Harvey. In 2016, she played Golde in the 2015 Bartlett Sher-directed revival of Fiddler on the Roof at the Broadway Theatre, and was in The Price with Mark Ruffalo, in 2017. At the 2018 Obie Awards for Off-Broadway productions, she won the Obie Award for Distinguished Performance by an Actress for her performance in Admissions at the Mitzi E. Newhouse Theater. At the 2023 Tony Awards, she was nominated for the Tony Award for Best Actress in a Play for her role in Summer, 1976. At the 2025 Tony Awards, she was nominated for the Tony Award for Best Featured Actress in a Play for her role in Eureka Day.

In 2017, she and producer Jenny Gersten founded The Campfire Project, a theatre-based wellness project that creates plays in refugee camps.

== Personal life ==
Hecht has been married to director Adam Bernstein since August 1995. They have two children together, Stella and Carlo, who were both teenagers as of 2013.

== Acting credits ==
=== Film ===
Year	Title	Role	Notes
1995	Joe's Rotten World	Annie	
1995	Kicking and Screaming	Airline ticket saleswoman	
1998	Anarchy TV	Natalie	
1999	Jump	Carol	
2004	Saving Face	Randi	
2004	Sideways	Victoria Cortland	
2004	The Forgotten	Eliot	
2005	At Last	Laura	
2006	Rabbits	Wife	Short film
2007	Starting Out in the Evening	Sandra Bennett	
2007	Dan in Real Life	Amy Burns	
2008	Quid Pro Quo	Edie	
2008	Calling It Quits	Cynthia	
2009	The Winning Season	Stacey	
2009	Reunion	Beth	
2009	Whatever Works	Helena	
2010	Helena from the Wedding	Lynn	
2010	Fair Game	Sue	
2010	My Soul to Take	May Hellerman	
2011	J. Edgar	Emma Goldman	
2011	The Sitter	Sandy Griffith	
2012	The Arm	Mrs. Bearmush	Short film
2012	The Magic of Belle Isle	Karen Loop	
2012	The Composer	Piccolo Player	Short film
2012	Good Sister	Helene Shuster	Short film
2013	Northern Borders	Liz Kittredge	
2013	Space Cadet	Linda Agnello	
2013	The English Teacher	Principal Trudie Slocum	
2014	Le Refuge	Gemma	Short film
2014	The Sisterhood of Night	Sue Parris	
2015	Anesthesia	Jill	
2018	Write When You Get Work	Ellen Hazard	
2018	Banana Split	Susan	
2019	The Sunlit Night	Mirela	
2019	A Beautiful Day in the Neighborhood	Lila Vogel	
2020	The Atlantic City Story	Jane	
2025	Eleanor the Great	Lisa Morgenstein	
2025	The Home	Sylvia	
2026	Primetime	Patty Patterson	

=== Television ===
Year	Title	Role	Notes
1994	Lois & Clark	Female Staffer	Episode: "Madame Ex"
1994	Seinfeld	Lindsay	Episodes: "The Couch", "The Gymnast"
1994	Party of Five	Amanda	Episode: "Something Out of Nothing"
1994–2000	Friends	Susan Bunch	12 episodes
1995	The Wayans Bros.	Agent Johnson	Episode: "First Class"
1995	The Heidi Chronicles	Chloe	Television film
1995	Aphrodisia	Rachel's Friend	Episode: "Dominatrix"
1995–1996	The Single Guy	Janeane Percy-Parker	Main role; 22 episodes
1996	Harvey	Miss Ruth Kelly	Television film
1996	The Christmas Tree	Sister Mary	Television film
1996	Intimate Betrayal	Katie	Television film
1997	Promised Land	Marie	Episode: "Independence Day"
1997	Early Edition	Abby	Episode: "A Bris Is Just a Bris"
1999	Law & Order: Special Victims Unit	Miss Kreutzer	Episode: "Uncivilized"
1999	Homicide: Life on the Street	Sister Mary Catherine	Episode: "Forgive Us Our Trespasses"
2001	What About Joan?	Betsy Morgan	Main role; 13 episodes
2003	Law & Order: Criminal Intent	Meredith Breen	Episode: "Undaunted Mettle"
2004	Century City	Rose Krell	Episode: "A Mind Is a Terrible Thing to Lose"
2004	The Jury	Mrs. Sheridan	Episode: "Three Boys and a Gun"
2005	ER	Stephanie Lowenstein	2 episodes
2006	3 lbs	Rebecca Ellis	Episode: "Heart Stopping"
2008	Eleventh Hour	Mrs. Beatrice Brown	Episode: "Cardiac"
2008–2013	Breaking Bad	Gretchen Schwartz	5 episodes
2009	Law & Order	Miriam Johnson	Episode: "Chattel"
2009	Jesse Stone: Thin Ice	Stephanie Morton	Television film
2009	U.S. Attorney	Dr. Amy Webber	Unaired pilot
2010	The Good Wife	Carla Browning	Episode: "Infamy"
2010	Medium	Judy Bennette	Episode: "The Match Game"
2010	CSI: Crime Scene Investigation	Carly Beck	Episode: "Cold Blooded"
2010	Bored to Death	Dr. Donna Kenwood	3 episodes
2011	Nurse Jackie	Mimi	Episode: "Enough Rope"
2011	Spring/Fall	Unknown	Unaired pilot
2012	Law & Order: Special Victims Unit	Jillian Webster	Episode: "Vanity's Bonfire"
2013	Elementary	Patricia Ennis	Episode: "The Deductionist"
2013–2015	Person of Interest	Beth Bridges / Psychiatrist	3 episodes
2014	Manhattan	Miriam Rubins	Episode: "The Second Coming"
2015	Limitless	Ubient Worker	Episode: "Side Effects May Include..."
2015	Jessica Jones	Audrey Eastman	Episode: "AKA 99 Friends"
2016	The Interestings	Lois Jacobson	Television film
2016	Falling Water	Miranda	2 episodes
2016–2017	Red Oaks	Rebecca Horowitz	10 episodes
2017	Madam Secretary	Julia MacDonald	Episode: "Persona Non Grata"
2017	Blindspot	Dr. Margaret Palmer	Episode: "Fix My Present Havoc"
2017	The Tap	Sophie Butler	Unaired pilot
2018	High Maintenance	Laurie	Episode: "Ghost"
2018	Quantico	Elizabeth Nutting	Episode: "The Blood of Romeo"
2019	The Loudest Voice	Nancy Erika Smith	2 episodes
2019	Succession	Michelle Pantsil	2 episodes
2019	The Affair	Carolina	Episode: "505"
2019–2021	Dickinson	Aunt Lavinia	4 episodes
2019–2021	Special	Karen Hayes	Main role; 16 episodes
2020	Little America	Professor	Episode: "The Cowboy"
2020	High Fidelity	Rob's Mom	Episode: "Fun Rob"
2020	The Boys	Carol Mannheim	5 episodes
2020–2021	The Sinner	Sonya Barzel	Main role; 12 episodes
2021	Younger	Susan Abbott	Episode: "Fallout"
2021	Hudson Falls	Laura Walsh	Episode #1.1
2021	10 Days	Cheryl Miles	Main role
2022	Super Pumped	Amy Gurley	3 episodes
2022–2024	Tokyo Vice	Willa Adelstein	6 episodes
2026	American Classic	Polly	5 episodes

=== Stage ===
Year	Title	Role	Venue
1990	Othello	Bianca	Classic Stage Company, Off-Broadway
1997	Plunge	Val Nyquist	Playwrights Horizons, Off-Broadway
1997	The Last Night of Ballyhoo	Lala Levy	Helen Hayes Theatre, Broadway
1998	Stop Kiss	Callie	The Public Theater, Off-Broadway
1998	The Most Fabulous Story Ever Told	Mabel	Williamstown Theatre Festival
1999	Lobster Alice	Alice Horowitz	Playwrights Horizons, Off-Broadway
2000	Light Up the Sky	Irene Livingston	Williamstown Theatre Festival
2002	The Fourth Sister	Wiera	Vineyard Theater, Off-Broadway
2002	Flesh and Blood	Susan	New York Theatre Workshop, Off-Broadway
2004	After the Fall	Louise	Roundabout Theatre Company, Broadway
2006	The House in Town	Amy Hammer	Lincoln Center Theater, Off-Broadway
2005	Julius Caesar	Portia	Belasco Theater, Broadway
2005	Top Girls	Marlene	Williamstown Theatre Festival
2007	Howard Katz	Jess	Roundabout Theatre Company, Off-Broadway
2007	Blithe Spirit	Ruth Condomine	Williamstown Theatre Festival
2007	The Autumn Garden	Nina Denery	Williamstown Theatre Festival
2008	Three Sisters	Olga Prozorov	Williamstown Theatre Festival
2009	Make Me	Connie	Atlantic Theater Company, Off-Broadway
2009	The Torch-Bearers	Mrs. Ritter	Williamstown Theatre Festival
2009	Brighton Beach Memoirs	Blanche Morton	Nederlander Theater, Broadway
2010	A View from the Bridge	Beatrice	Cort Theater, Broadway
2010	Our Town	Mrs. Webb	Williamstown Theatre Festival
2011	Three Sisters	Olga Prozorov	Classic Stage Company, Off-Broadway
2011	A Streetcar Named Desire	Blanche DuBois	Williamstown Theatre Festival
2012	Harvey	Veta Louise Simmons	Roundabout Theatre Company, Broadway
2013	The Assembled Parties	Julie Bascov	Manhattan Theatre Club, Broadway
2014	Stage Kiss	She	Playwrights Horizons, Off-Broadway
2014	King Lear	Regan	The Public Theater, Off-Broadway
2015	Legacy	Suzanne Kind	Williamstown Theatre Festival
2015	Fiddler on the Roof	Golde	Broadway Theatre (53rd Street), Broadway
2017	The Price	Esther Franz	Roundabout Theatre Company, Broadway
2017	The Clean House	Virginia	Williamstown Theatre Festival
2018	Admissions	Sherri Rosen-Mason	Lincoln Center Theater, Off-Broadway
2018	The Closet	Patricia Pennebarry	Williamstown Theatre Festival
2022	The Orchard	Lyubov Ranevskaya	Baryshnikov Arts Center, Off-Broadway
2023	Letters From Max	Sarah Ruhl	Signature Theatre Company, Off-Broadway
2023	Summer, 1976	Alice	Manhattan Theatre Club, Broadway
2024	Eureka Day	Suzanne	Manhattan Theatre Club, Broadway
2025	A Mother	Jess/Pelagea/Pearl	Baryshnikov Arts Center, Off-Broadway
2026	Dog Day Afternoon	Colleen	August Wilson Theatre, Broadway

=== Video games ===
Year	Title	Role	Notes
1995	Terror T.R.A.X.: Track of the Vampire	Wendolyn	
1995	The Dark Eye	Unknown	

=== Audiobook narration ===
Year	Title	Author	Notes
2010	Full Dark, No Stars	Stephen King	
2011	The Dovekeepers	Alice Hoffman	
2023	Summer, 1976	David Auburn	

== Awards and nominations ==
Year	Associations	Category	Project	Result	Ref.
2010	Tony Award	Best Featured Actress in a Play	A View from the Bridge	Nominated	
2010	Drama League Award	Distinguished Performance	A View from the Bridge	Nominated	
2013	Drama League Award	Distinguished Performance	Harvey	Nominated	
2014	Outer Critics Circle Award	Outstanding Actress in a Play	Stage Kiss	Nominated	
2018	Outer Critics Circle Award	Outstanding Actress in a Play	Admissions	Nominated	
2018	Obie Award	Distinguished Performance	Admissions	Won	
2019	Primetime Emmy Award	Outstanding Actress in a Short Form Comedy or Drama Series	Special	Nominated	
2023	Tony Award	Best Actress in a Play	Summer, 1976	Nominated	
2025	Tony Award	Best Featured Actress in a Play	Eureka Day	Nominated	
2025	Dorian Award	Outstanding Featured Performance in a Broadway Play	Eureka Day	Nominated	
2026	Outer Critics Circle Award	Outstanding Featured Performer in a Broadway Play	Dog Day Afternoon	Nominated	
2026	Dorian Award	Outstanding Featured Performance in a Broadway Play	Dog Day Afternoon	Nominated	
