= An Emmy for Megan =

- Genre: Comedy
- Created by: Megan Amram
- Written by: Megan Amram
- Directed by: Megan Amram
- Starring: Megan Amram; Patton Oswalt
- No. of seasons: 2
- No. of episodes: 12

Production
- Executive producers: Megan Amram; Dave Kneebone; Janel Kranking
- Producer: Joseph Carnegie
- Production location: United States
- Cinematography: Barry Elmore
- Editor: Vera Drew
- Running time: 28 minutes
- Production company: Abso Lutely Productions

Original release
- Network: anemmyformegan.com
- Release: April 26, 2018 – May 1, 2019

An Emmy for Megan is a comedy web series created, directed, written, and starring Megan Amram. It depicts Amram's quest to win an Emmy by meeting the minimum standards to qualify for a nomination in the Outstanding Actress in a Short Form Comedy or Drama Series category.

The first series was nominated for two awards at the 70th Primetime Emmy Awards in the categories of Outstanding Short Form Comedy or Drama Series and the Outstanding Actress in a Short Form Comedy or Drama Series for Amram. The series lost to James Corden's Next James Corden, and Amram lost to Christina Pickles.

The second series was nominated for two awards at the 71st Primetime Emmy Awards in the categories of Outstanding Short Form Comedy or Drama Series and the Outstanding Actor in a Short Form Comedy or Drama Series for Patton Oswalt.

The first series aired on IFC on September 17, 2018, to counterprogram the 70th Primetime Emmy Awards.

== Cast ==
- Megan Amram (Seasons 1–2)
- Patton Oswalt (Season 2)

=== Guest appearances ===
- J. J. Abrams
- Rachel Axler
- Awkwafina (Season 2)
- Kate Berlant (Season 2)
- Alex Borstein (Season 2)
- D'Arcy Carden
- James Corden (Season 2)
- Ted Danson
- John Early (Season 2)
- Nathan Fielder (Season 2)
- Leslie Grossman (Season 2)
- Rian Johnson
- Jimmy Kimmel
- Andrew Law (Season 2)
- Phil Lord and Christopher Miller (Season 2)
- Natasha Lyonne (Season 2)
- Ira Madison III (Seasons 1–2)
- Audra McDonald (Season 2)
- Lin-Manuel Miranda (Season 2)
- Mandy Moore (Season 2)
- Natalie Morales (Season 2)
- John Mulaney (Season 2)
- Megan Mullaly (Season 2)
- Cliff Murray (Seasons 1–2)
- Nick Offerman (Season 2)
- Kaitlin Olson (Season 2)
- Brian Polk (Seasons 1–2)
- Retta (Season 2)
- Alison Rich (Seasons 1–2)
- Seth Rogen
- RuPaul
- Shannon Woodward (Seasons 1–2)
- Alan Yang

== Episodes ==
=== Season 1 (2018) ===
No. overall	No. in season	Title	Directed by	Written by	Original release date
1	1	"Rules"	Megan Amram	Megan Amram	April 26, 2018
Guests: Brian Polk, Alison Rich, Shannon Woodward
2	2	"Weight"	Megan Amram	Megan Amram	April 26, 2018
Guests: Cliff Murray, Brian Polk
3	3	"Diversity"	Megan Amram	Megan Amram	April 26, 2018
Guests: Ira Madison III
4	4	"Episode 4"	Megan Amram	Megan Amram	April 26, 2018
Guests: Alan Yang, Ted Danson, Seth Rogen, Jimmy Kimmel, Rian Johnson, J. J. Abrams, RuPaul
5	5	"Music"	Megan Amram	Megan Amram	April 26, 2018
Guests: Rachel Axler
6	6	"Episode 6"	Megan Amram	Megan Amram	April 26, 2018
Guests: D'Arcy Carden

=== Season 2 (2019) ===
No. overall	No. in season	Title	Directed by	Written by	Original release date
7	1	"Episode 1"	Megan Amram	Megan Amram	May 1, 2019
Guests: Ira Madison III, Cliff Murray, Brian Polk, Alison Rich, Shannon Woodward, Patton Oswalt
8	2	"Episode 2"	Megan Amram	Megan Amram	May 1, 2019
Guests: Kate Berlant, John Early, Patton Oswalt
9	3	"Episode 3"	Megan Amram	Megan Amram	May 1, 2019
Guests: Retta, Alison Rich, Patton Oswalt
10	4	"Episode 4"	Megan Amram	Megan Amram	May 1, 2019
Guests: Awkwafina, Alex Borstein, Nathan Fielder, Phil Lord and Christopher Miller, Natasha Lyonne, Audra McDonald, Lin-Manuel Miranda, Mandy Moore, John Mulaney, Megan Mullaly, Nick Offerman, Kaitlin Olson, Patton Oswalt
11	5	"Episode 5"	Megan Amram	Megan Amram	May 1, 2019
Guests: Andrew Law, Patton Oswalt
12	6	"Episode 6"	Megan Amram	Megan Amram	May 1, 2019
Guests: Leslie Grossman, Natalie Morales, James Corden, Patton Oswalt

== Awards and nominations ==
Award nominations for An Emmy for Megan
Year	Association	Category	Nominee(s)	Result
2018	Primetime Emmy Awards	Outstanding Short Form Comedy or Drama Series	An Emmy for Megan	Nominated
2018	Primetime Emmy Awards	Outstanding Actress in a Short Form Comedy or Drama Series	Megan Amram	Nominated
2019	Primetime Emmy Awards	Outstanding Short Form Comedy or Drama Series	An Emmy for Megan	Nominated
2019	Primetime Emmy Awards	Outstanding Actor in a Short Form Comedy or Drama Series	Patton Oswalt	Nominated
