= Ty Burrell =

American actor (born 1967)

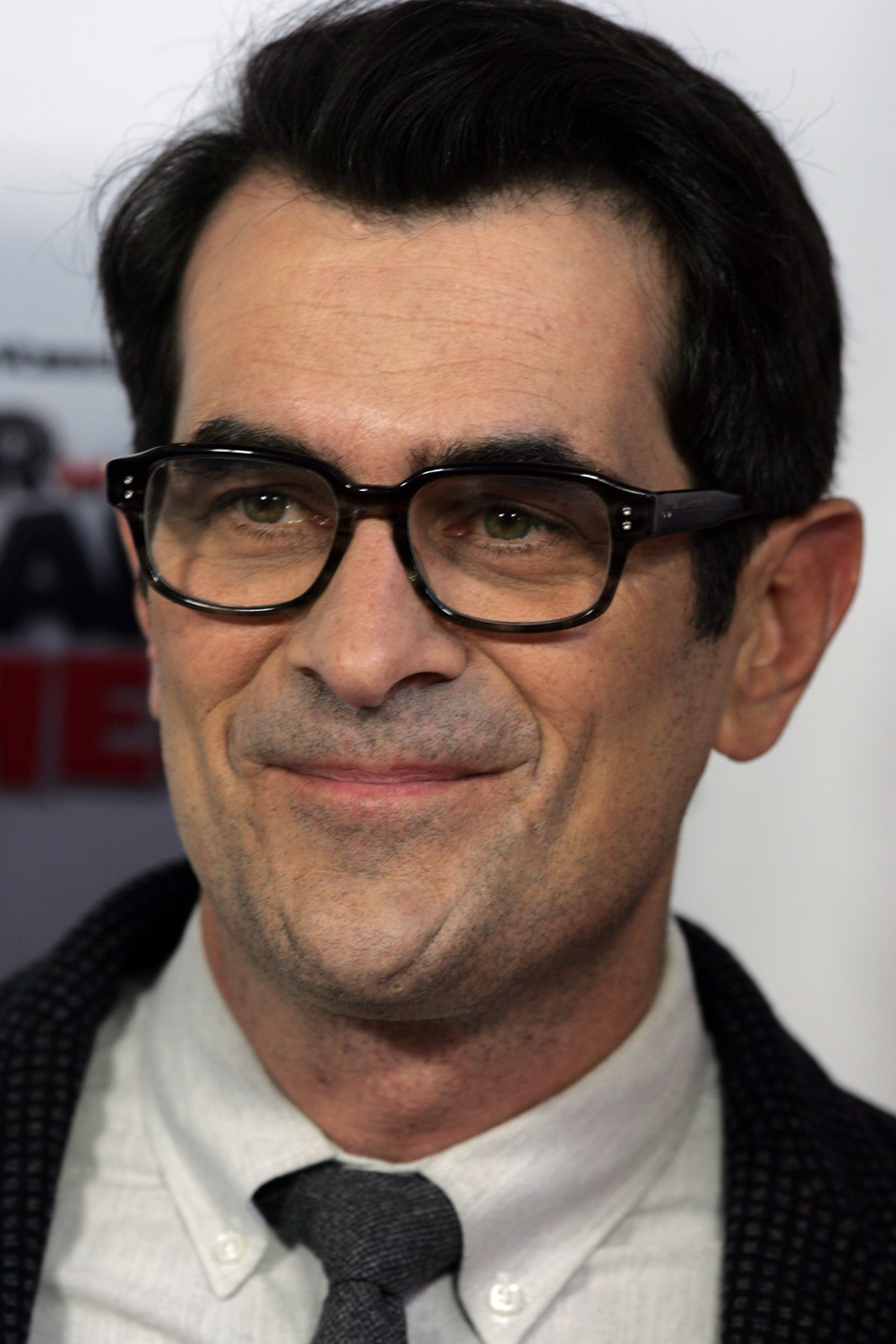
- Burrell in February 2014
- Born: Tyler Gerald Burrell; August 22, 1967 (age 59); Grants Pass, Oregon, U.S.
- Education: Southern Oregon University (BA); Pennsylvania State University (MFA)
- Occupation: Actor
- Years active: 1997–present
- Known for: Phil Dunphy in Modern Family
- Spouse: Holly Burrell (m. 2000)
- Children: 2

Tyler Gerald Burrell (born August 22, 1967) is an American actor. Burrell is best known for playing Phil Dunphy on the ABC sitcom Modern Family (2009–2020), for which he won two Primetime Emmy Awards for Outstanding Supporting Actor in a Comedy Series and five Screen Actors Guild Awards.

Burrell also had starring roles on the television series Out of Practice (2005–2006) and Back to You (2007–2008), and acted in films such as Evolution, Black Hawk Down (both 2001), Dawn of the Dead (2004), The Incredible Hulk (2008), and Muppets Most Wanted (2014). He voiced characters in the animated films Mr. Peabody & Sherman (2014), Finding Dory (2016), and Storks (2016). On stage, Burrell made his Broadway debut playing Lennox in the revival of the William Shakespeare play Macbeth (2000).

== Early life and education ==
Tyler Gerald Burrell was born in Grants Pass, Oregon, on August 22, 1967, the son of teacher Sheri Rose (née Hauck) and family therapist Gary Gerald Burrell (1940–1989). He has a younger brother, Duncan. He is mostly of English and German descent, though he discovered via Finding Your Roots that he is also of 1/16th African-American ancestry through his great-great-grandmother, a formerly enslaved girl from Tennessee who became a homesteader in Oregon. He grew up in Applegate, Oregon, near the California border. He attended Hidden Valley High School in Grants Pass, where he played football and was a lineman for the Hidden Valley Mustangs.

While attending college at the University of Oregon, Burrell became a member of the Sigma Chi fraternity and worked as a bartender at the Oregon Shakespeare Festival. He later attended Southern Oregon University in Ashland, graduating with a bachelor's degree in theatre arts in 1993. Fifteen years later, in 2008, he was the school's commencement speaker.

Continuing his education at Penn State University, he earned an MFA and was a member of the Theatre 100 Company along with Keegan-Michael Key. In 1997 and 1999, Burrell worked as a festival actor at the Utah Shakespeare Festival. He has also stated that for a period of time in graduate school, he lived out of his van to save money. He relocated to New York City following the completion of his education and began looking for work. He shared with New York Times in 2017 that he experienced fecal incontinence in the streets of Times Square after his first meeting with a talent agent at a legitimate agency. He recalled: "I stood there for a surprisingly long time before I realized what had happened. My ears were ringing from the shock of the meeting. Yet I didn’t move. I watched all the people of the world cross back and forth in front of me." Acting quickly, he retreated to a nearby McDonald's and disposed of his undergarments, and then "walked out of the bathroom, past the huddled masses at the tables, [back] into Times Square and the new world." He stated the belief that the accident was a result of severe anxiety he was experiencing prior to the meeting that had persisted after it was over.

== Career ==
Burrell's first credited film roles were 2001's Evolution and Black Hawk Down. He subsequently appeared in the 2004 remake of Dawn of the Dead, and in several stage roles (such as 2000's Broadway production of Macbeth, and the off-Broadway plays Corners, The Blue Demon, Burn This, and Show People).

He was a co-writer and actor in the original production of the offbeat comedy The Red Herring O' Happiness directed by Russell Dyball. Burrell's stage work also includes writing and working in the off Broadway play Babble with his brother, Duncan. He has also made an appearance as a New Jersey prosecutor in Law & Order: Special Victims Unit.

After that, Burrell was cast as Oliver Barnes, a shallow but well-meaning plastic surgeon, on the CBS sitcom Out of Practice (2005–06), also created by screenwriter Christopher Lloyd. The show was canceled in May 2006, with eight episodes remaining unaired in the United States. After the show's cancellation, he played Allan Arbus in the film Fur: An Imaginary Portrait of Diane Arbus. In the same year, he also appeared in Friends with Money and The Darwin Awards, before playing one of the two leads in the world premiere of Drunk Enough to Say I Love You? by Caryl Churchill on stage at the Royal Court Theatre in London.

In 2007, he had a small role in the film National Treasure: Book of Secrets as the curator of the White House followed by a starring role in the sitcom Back to You on Fox later that same year. On the show, created by Steven Levitan and Christopher Lloyd, Burrell played a field reporter (alongside Kelsey Grammer and Patricia Heaton). The show was canceled in 2008.

In the 2008 Marvel film adaptation of the comic The Incredible Hulk Burrell played Leonard Samson (without superpowers) who had a short relationship with Betty Ross.

He had a lead role as Realtor Phil Dunphy in the acclaimed ABC situation comedy Modern Family which was also created by Christopher Lloyd and Steve Levitan. For his performance, he received eight consecutive Primetime Emmy Award nominations for Outstanding Supporting Actor in a Comedy Series (2010–2017), winning the award twice in 2011 and 2014.

He also received nominations for the Screen Actors Guild Award for Outstanding Performance by a Male Actor in a Comedy Series for his role, sharing the Screen Actors Guild Award for Outstanding Performance by an Ensemble in a Comedy Series with his co stars. He was the recipient of the individual SAG award in 2014, defeating Alec Baldwin, who had previously won the award seven years in a row.

Burrell also appears as Phil in commercials for National Association of Realtors.

In November 2014, Burrell signed an overall deal with 20th Century Fox Television to develop his own comedy projects. In July 2020, his overall deal with 20th Century Fox continued with the establishment of his own production company, Desert Whale Productions.

His web series Boondoggle, loosely based on Burrell's own life, debuted in June 2016 on ABC.com and ABCd. He was nominated for the Primetime Emmy Award for Outstanding Actor in a Short Form Comedy or Drama Series in July 2017.

== Ventures and charity work ==
Burrell owns The Eating Establishment, a restaurant in Park City, Utah, as well as two bars in Salt Lake City called Bar X and Beer Bar, located next to each other with interconnecting doors.

When the COVID-19 pandemic shut down Salt Lake City's bars and restaurants in March 2020, Burrell and his wife used $100,000 of their own money to create Tip Your Server, a crowd-sourced online fund to help out-of-work wait staff in Utah, where they had previously kept their main residence.

== Personal life ==
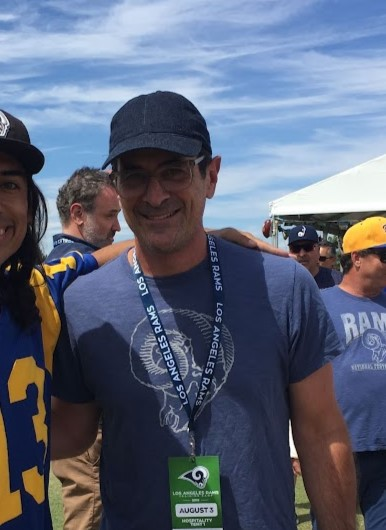
Burrell attending Los Angeles Rams' training camp in 2019

Burrell married his wife, Holly, on August 18, 2000. They resided in New York City until moving to Salt Lake City in 2008. They still own a two-bedroom apartment in New York's Astoria neighborhood, which they rent out. At one point, they relocated to Southern California for Burrell's work on Modern Family. In March 2010, Burrell said that they had adopted a baby girl and another girl two years later. Burrell and his family moved to Salt Lake City from Los Angeles after Modern Family ended in 2020. In an interview with People, he said that he has "no regrets" about moving his family there, as it is "a great place to raise the kids".

Burrell is a self-described lifelong fan of the Oregon Ducks, Portland Trail Blazers, New York Mets, and the Los Angeles Rams.

== Filmography ==
=== Film ===
Year	Title	Role	Notes
2001	Evolution	Colonel Flemming	
2001	Black Hawk Down	Timothy A. Wilkinson	
2004	Dawn of the Dead	Steve Marcus	
2004	In Good Company	Enrique Colon	
2005	Down in the Valley	Sheriff / Cowboy	
2006	Friends with Money	Other Aaron	
2006	The Darwin Awards	Emile	
2006	Fur	Allan Arbus	
2007	National Treasure 2: Book of Secrets	Connor	
2008	The Incredible Hulk	Dr. Leonard Samson	
2009	Leaves of Grass	Professor Sorenson	
2010	Fair Game	Fred	
2010	Morning Glory	Paul McVee	
2011	Butter	Bob Pickler	
2012	Goats	Frank Whitman	
2014	The Skeleton Twins	Rich Levitt	
2014	Mr. Peabody & Sherman	Mr. Hector Peabody (voice)	
2014	Muppets Most Wanted	Jean Pierre Napoleon	
2016	Finding Dory	Bailey (voice)	
2016	Storks	Henry Gardner (voice)	
2017	Rough Night	Pietro	

=== Television ===
Year	Title	Role	Notes
2000, 2003	Law & Order	Paul Donatelli	Episode: "Turnstile Justice"
2000, 2003	Law & Order	Herman Capshaw	Episode: "Sheltered"
2001	The West Wing	Tom Starks	Episode: "The Women of Qumar"
2002	Law & Order: Special Victims Unit	Alan Messinger	Episode: "Execution"
2003	Nip/Tuck	"Big Mike"	Episode: "Joel Gideon"
2005–2006	Out of Practice	Dr. Oliver Barnes	21 episodes
2007	Lipshitz Saves the World	Man in Red	Episode: "Pilot"
2007–2008	Back to You	Gary Crezyzewski	17 episodes
2008	Fourplay	Christopher	Episode: "Pilot"
2009	Damages	Douglas Schiff	2 episodes
2009–2020	Modern Family	Phil Dunphy	Main role
2010–2011	The Super Hero Squad Show	Captain Marvel (voice)	3 episodes
2010–2011	Glenn Martin, DDS	Mart-E (voice)	2 episodes
2012	Doc McStuffins	Big Jack (voice)	Episode: "Out of the Box"
2012–2014	Key & Peele	Nazi Commander / Colonel Hans Müller	2 episodes
2015	Comedy Bang! Bang!	Himself	Episode: "Ty Burrell Wears a Chambray Shirt and Clear Frame Glasses"
2015	The Penguins of Madagascar	Parker (voice)	Episode: "The Penguin Who Loved Me"
2016	Boondoggle	Ty	Main role; also writer
2017	Family Guy	Himself	Episode: "Emmy-Winning Episode"
2020	A Modern Farewell	Himself	Modern Family documentary
2020–2022	Duncanville	Jack Harris (voice)	Main role
2026	Rick and Morty	Bob (voice)	Episode: "Jer Bud"

=== Theatre ===
Year	Title	Role	Venue	Ref.
1997	Henry V	Gower	Adams Theatre, Utah Shakespeare Festival	
1998-1999	Twelfth Night	Antonio; Understudy for Orsino	Shakespeare Theatre, Washington DC	
1999	King John	The Earl of Essex	Shakespeare Theatre, Washington DC	
1999	A Midsummer Night's Dream	Oberon	Adams Theatre, Utah Shakespeare Festival	
2000	Coriolanus	Lieutenant to Aufidius / Roman Senator	Shakespeare Theatre, Washington DC	
2000	Macbeth	Lennox	Music Box Theatre, Broadway	
2002	Burn This	Burton	Union Square Theatre, Off-Broadway	
2004	Richard III	Henry Stafford	The Public Theater, Off-Broadway	
2006	Show People	Tom	Second Stage Theatre, Off-Broadway	
2006	Drunk Enough to Say I Love You?	Sam	Royal Court Theatre, London	

== Awards and nominations ==
Organizations	Year	Category	Work	Result	Ref.
Primetime Emmy Award	2010	Outstanding Supporting Actor in a Comedy Series	Modern Family (episode: "Up All Night")	Nominated	
Primetime Emmy Award	2011	Outstanding Supporting Actor in a Comedy Series	Modern Family (episode: "Good Cop Bad Dog")	Won	
Primetime Emmy Award	2012	Outstanding Supporting Actor in a Comedy Series	Modern Family (episode: "Lifetime Supply")	Nominated	
Primetime Emmy Award	2013	Outstanding Supporting Actor in a Comedy Series	Modern Family (episode: "Mistery Date")	Nominated	
Primetime Emmy Award	2014	Outstanding Supporting Actor in a Comedy Series	Modern Family (episode: "Spring-a-Ding-Fling")	Won	
Primetime Emmy Award	2015	Outstanding Supporting Actor in a Comedy Series	Modern Family (episode: "Crying Out Loud")	Nominated	
Primetime Emmy Award	2016	Outstanding Supporting Actor in a Comedy Series	Modern Family (episode: "The Party")	Nominated	
Primetime Emmy Award	2017	Outstanding Supporting Actor in a Comedy Series	Modern Family (episode: "Grab It")	Nominated	
Primetime Emmy Award	2017	Outstanding Actor in a Short Form Series	Boondoggle	Nominated	
Screen Actors Guild Awards	2009	Outstanding Ensemble in a Comedy Series	Modern Family (season 1)	Nominated	
Screen Actors Guild Awards	2010	Outstanding Ensemble in a Comedy Series	Modern Family (season 2)	Won	
Screen Actors Guild Awards	2010	Outstanding Male Actor in a Comedy Series	Modern Family (season 2)	Nominated	
Screen Actors Guild Awards	2011	Outstanding Ensemble in a Comedy Series	Modern Family (season 3)	Won	
Screen Actors Guild Awards	2011	Outstanding Male Actor in a Comedy Series	Modern Family (season 3)	Nominated	
Screen Actors Guild Awards	2012	Outstanding Ensemble in a Comedy Series	Modern Family (season 4)	Won	
Screen Actors Guild Awards	2012	Outstanding Male Actor in a Comedy Series	Modern Family (season 4)	Nominated	
Screen Actors Guild Awards	2013	Outstanding Ensemble in a Comedy Series	Modern Family (season 5)	Won	
Screen Actors Guild Awards	2013	Outstanding Male Actor in a Comedy Series	Modern Family (season 5)	Won	
Screen Actors Guild Awards	2014	Outstanding Ensemble in a Comedy Series	Modern Family (season 6)	Nominated	
Screen Actors Guild Awards	2014	Outstanding Male Actor in a Comedy Series	Modern Family (season 6)	Nominated	
Screen Actors Guild Awards	2015	Outstanding Ensemble in a Comedy Series	Modern Family (season 7)	Nominated	
Screen Actors Guild Awards	2015	Outstanding Male Actor in a Comedy Series	Modern Family (season 7)	Nominated	
Screen Actors Guild Awards	2016	Outstanding Ensemble in a Comedy Series	Modern Family (season 8)	Nominated	
Screen Actors Guild Awards	2016	Outstanding Male Actor in a Comedy Series	Modern Family (season 8)	Nominated	
