= Boondoggle (web series) =

- Written by: Ty Burrell; Mel Cowan; Johnny Meeks; Joel Spence
- Directed by: Vincent Peone; Josh Ruben
- Starring: Ty Burrell; Mel Cowan; Johnny Meeks; Joel Spence
- Country of origin: United States
- Original language: English
- No. of seasons: 1
- No. of episodes: 6

Production
- Executive producers: Ty Burrell; Mel Cowan; Johnny Meeks; Joel Spence
- Running time: 7 minutes
- Production company: Fox Digital Studio

Original release
- Network: ABC.com
- Release: June 23, 2016

Boondoggle is an American comedy web series loosely based on the life of actor Ty Burrell.

== Premise ==
A struggling boss named Henry finally lands a successful series. He and his best friends, 40-something husbands and fathers, reap the benefits of his TV stardom.

== Development and production ==
In November 2014, Ty Burrell signed an overall deal with 20th Century Fox Television to develop his own comedy projects. Working with longtime friends Johnny Meeks, Joel Spence and Mel Cowan – performers he knew from his time with Upright Citizens Brigade – they all developed Boondoggle.

== Reception ==
The series debuted on ABC.com and web platform ABCd in June 2016. In September 2016, Backstage named it one of the "11 web series you should know about" and called it "rollicking good fun." Ty Burrell was nominated for the Primetime Emmy Award for Outstanding Actor in a Short Form Comedy or Drama Series.
