= The Earliest Show =

American comedy web series

- Official promotional poster
- Genre: Improvisational comedy Parody
- Directed by: Ben Schwartz
- Starring: Ben Schwartz; Lauren Lapkus
- Country of origin: United States
- Original language: English
- No. of seasons: 1
- No. of episodes: 6

Production
- Running time: 11-13 minutes
- Production company: Funny or Die

Original release
- Release: October 27 – December 6, 2016

The Earliest Show is an American comedy web series starring Ben Schwartz and Lauren Lapkus. Produced by Funny or Die, the series was sponsored by Cap'n Crunch cereal as a form of branded content. It follows morning show co-hosts Josh Bath and Sam Newman who must deal with the aftermath of Josh's failed on-air marriage proposal. The show is largely improvised. The Earliest Show premiered on October 27, 2016 and consisted of six episodes. A television adaptation of the series was announced in 2025.

== Synopsis ==
Josh Bath (Ben Schwartz) and Sam Newman (Lauren Lapkus) are co-hosts of The Earliest Show, which broadcasts at 3:00am. Josh surprises his girlfriend (Jessica Meraz) with an on-air proposal and begins to unravel emotionally after she rejects him. Each episode follows Josh going through a different stage of grief on-air.

== Cast ==
- Ben Schwartz as Josh Bath, co-host
- Lauren Lapkus as Samantha Newman, co-host
- Jessica Meraz as Emily Fernandez, Josh's ex-girlfriend
- Joe Hartzler as Mark the producer
- Eugene Cordero as Chef Tommy
- Betsy Sodaro as Katie Veal
- Arielle Vandenberg as Janice Crawl
- Ryan Stanger performs the in-show commercials for fake products

=== Guest starring ===
- Jake Johnson, Thomas Middleditch, Reggie Watts, Reggie Miller, Pedro Pascal, and Jane Levy as themselves

== Production ==
=== Development ===
Cap'n Crunch previously worked with Funny or Die and approached Schwartz with an idea for a series targeting a young demographic. He pitched a parody of a morning show based around a co-host whose rejected marriage proposal causes him to spiral. Schwartz also directed the series and recruited former Asssscat improv team member Lapkus as his co-host. Schwartz studied Today and Live with Kelly to get a sense of morning talk show format, camera work, and set design. Each episode consisted largely of improvisation. Schwartz said his favorite part of this series were the interviews because they got people who don’t normally improvise to try improv. An additional episode of over an hour of improvised bloopers was released as episode seven of the series.

=== Release ===
The Earliest Show premiered on Funny Or Die on October 27, 2016, and one episode was released each Tuesday thereafter. The episodes were also released on YouTube. Each episode runs for 11 to 13 minutes. Two additional episodes, one of bloopers and one with extended interviews, were also released.

== Accolades ==
Schwartz and Lapkus received 2017 Primetime Creative Arts Emmy Awards nominations for acting in the Short Form Comedy or Drama Series category.

== Television adaptation ==
In November 2025, Deadline Hollywood reported that Amplify Pictures had commissioned a full season of a television series remake of the show. Schwartz is set to write, direct, and star in the half-hour comedy, with Lapkus reprising her role as co-host.
