= State of the Union (British TV series) =

- Genre: Comedy
- Written by: Nick Hornby
- Directed by: Stephen Frears
- Starring: Rosamund Pike (s,1); Chris O'Dowd (s.1); Brendan Gleeson (s.2); Patricia Clarkson (s.2)
- Composer: Roger Eno
- Country of origin: United Kingdom
- Original language: English
- No. of seasons: 2
- No. of episodes: 20

Production
- Executive producers: Nick Hornby; Stephen Frears; Jamie Laurenson; Hakan Kousetta; Iain Canning; Emile Sherman
- Producer: Amy Jackson
- Running time: 10 minutes
- Production company: See-Saw Films

Original release
- Network: Sundance TV; BBC2
- Release: 6 May 2019 – 23 February 2022

State of the Union is a British comedy television series that aired on BBC and Sundance TV. It is written by Nick Hornby and directed by Stephen Frears.

The second season premiered in February 2022.

== Premise ==
Season 1 of State of the Union follows "Louise and Tom, played by Pike and O’Dowd, who meet in a pub immediately before their weekly marital therapy session. Each episode pieces together how their lives were, what drew them together, and what has started to pull them apart."

== Cast and characters ==
=== Season 1 ===
- Rosamund Pike as Louise
- Chris O'Dowd as Tom

=== Season 2 ===
- Brendan Gleeson as Scott
- Patricia Clarkson as Ellen
- Esco Jouley as Jay

== Episodes ==
=== Series overview ===
Series	Episodes	Originally released	
Series	Episodes	First released	Last released
1	10	6 May 2019	17 May 2019
2	10	14 February 2022	23 February 2022

=== Season 1 (2019) ===
No. overall	No. in series	Title	Directed by	Written by	Original release date	US viewers (millions)
1	1	"Marathon"	Stephen Frears	Nick Hornby	6 May 2019	N/A
2	2	"Antique Globes"	Stephen Frears	Nick Hornby	6 May 2019 (Sundance Now); 7 May 2019 (Sundance TV)	N/A
3	3	"Syria"	Stephen Frears	Nick Hornby	7 May 2019 (Sundance Now); 8 May 2019 (Sundance TV)	N/A
4	4	"Plaster Cast"	Stephen Frears	Nick Hornby	7 May 2019 (Sundance Now); 9 May 2019 (Sundance TV)	N/A
5	5	"Normal Slope"	Stephen Frears	Nick Hornby	8 May 2019 (Sundance Now); 10 May 2019 (Sundance TV)	N/A
6	6	"Nigel and Naomi"	Stephen Frears	Nick Hornby	8 May 2019 (Sundance Now); 13 May 2019 (Sundance TV)	N/A
7	7	"Call the Midwife"	Stephen Frears	Nick Hornby	9 May 2019 (Sundance Now); 14 May 2019 (Sundance TV)	N/A
8	8	"Dolphins"	Stephen Frears	Nick Hornby	9 May 2019 (Sundance Now); 15 May 2019 (Sundance TV)	N/A
9	9	"Prison Sex"	Stephen Frears	Nick Hornby	10 May 2019 (Sundance Now); 16 May 2019 (Sundance TV)	N/A
10	10	"Another Drink"	Stephen Frears	Nick Hornby	10 May 2019 (Sundance Now); 17 May 2019 (Sundance TV)	N/A

=== Season 2 (2022) ===
No. overall	No. in series	Title	Directed by	Written by	Original release date	US viewers (millions)
11	1	"The Laws of Grammar"	Stephen Frears	Nick Hornby	14 February 2022	N/A
12	2	"Why Quake?"	Stephen Frears	Nick Hornby	15 February 2022	N/A
13	3	"Big Mustard"	Stephen Frears	Nick Hornby	16 February 2022	N/A
14	4	"Prison Thoughts"	Stephen Frears	Nick Hornby	17 February 2022	N/A
15	5	"Led Zeppelin's Accountant"	Stephen Frears	Nick Hornby	18 February 2022	N/A
16	6	"Intimacy Kit"	Stephen Frears	Nick Hornby	19 February 2022	N/A
17	7	"The Road Most Travelled"	Stephen Frears	Nick Hornby	20 February 2022	N/A
18	8	"Facetime TV"	Stephen Frears	Nick Hornby	21 February 2022	N/A
19	9	"Kopi Luwak"	Stephen Frears	Nick Hornby	22 February 2022	N/A
20	10	"The Last Box"	Stephen Frears	Nick Hornby	23 February 2022	N/A

== Production ==
=== Development ===
On 13 July 2018, it was announced that Sundance TV had given the production a series order consisting of ten episodes running around ten minutes each. The series was expected to be written by Nick Hornby and directed by Stephen Frears, both of whom were set to be executive producers. Production companies involved with the series included See-Saw Films.

=== Series 1 ===
==== Casting ====
Alongside the series order announcement, it was confirmed that Rosamund Pike and Chris O'Dowd had been cast in the series' lead roles for season 1.

==== Filming ====
Principal photography for the series was scheduled to begin in the summer of 2018 in London, England. The pub used for the series was the Thatched House in Hammersmith, London W6.

==== Soundtrack ====
Roger Eno scored the soundtrack, which was performed by jazz musicians Jack Pinter, Sebastian Rochford (drums) and Steve Watts on saxophone and recorded at AIR Studios in London, according to the trailer.

=== Series 2 ===
On 25 January 2021 the series was renewed for a second season, starring Brendan Gleeson, Patricia Clarkson and Esco Jouléy.

== Release ==
On 10 October 2018, a "first-look" image from the series was released. On 28 January 2019, the series received its world premiere during the 2019 Sundance Film Festival.

In the UK, the first series aired on BBC Two in September 2019, and the second series followed in May 2022.

== Reception ==
In a positive review, Variety's Daniel D'Addario praised the series saying, "State of the Union pulls off a neat trick; given both its short running time and its fleetness of dialogue, we never get tired of hearing this couple's arguments, which could in other contexts be tiresome and circular." In another encouraging criticism, The Hollywood Reporter's Daniel Fienberg described the series as a "clever and beautifully acted piece" and declared that "Stephen Frears and Nick Hornby's perceptive two-hander is still well worth seeing."

== Awards and nominations ==
Year	Award	Category	Nominee(s)	Result	Ref.
2019	Primetime Emmy Awards	Outstanding Short Form Comedy or Drama Series	Nick Hornby, Stephen Frears, Jamie Laurenson, Hakan Kousetta, Iain Canning, and Emile Sherman	Won	
2019	Primetime Emmy Awards	Outstanding Actor in a Short Form Comedy or Drama Series	Chris O'Dowd	Won	
2019	Primetime Emmy Awards	Outstanding Actress in a Short Form Comedy or Drama Series	Rosamund Pike	Won	
2022	Hollywood Critics Association TV Awards	Best Short Form Live-Action Series	State of the Union	Nominated	
2022	Primetime Emmy Awards	Outstanding Actor in a Short Form Comedy or Drama Series	Brendan Gleeson	Nominated	
2022	Primetime Emmy Awards	Outstanding Actress in a Short Form Comedy or Drama Series	Patricia Clarkson	Won	
2022	Artios Awards	Outstanding Achievement in Casting – Short Form Series	Kathleen Chopin, John Ort	Won	
