= Die Hart =

American comedy series

- Official poster
- Also known as: Die Hart 2: Die Harter (season 2); Die Hart 3: Hart to Kill (season 3)
- Genre: Comedy; Action-adventure
- Screenplay by: Tripper Clancy
- Story by: Tripper Clancy; Derek Kolstad
- Directed by: Eric Appel; Josh Ruben
- Starring: Kevin Hart; John Travolta; Nathalie Emmanuel; Josh Hartnett; Ben Schwartz; Paula Pell; John Cena; Anna Garcia; Tony Cavalero; Kathryn Hahn; J. K. Simmons
- Country of origin: United States
- Original language: English
- No. of seasons: 3
- No. of episodes: 25

Production
- Executive producers: Bryan Smiley; Candice Wilson; Jeff Clanagan; Kevin Hart; Luke Kelly-Clyne; Mike Stein; Kevin Healey
- Camera setup: Single-camera
- Running time: 10 minutes
- Production company: LOL Studios

Original release
- Network: Quibi (season 1); The Roku Channel (season 2–present)
- Release: July 20, 2020 – present

Die Hart is an American comedy action-adventure television series that premiered on the streaming service Quibi on July 20, 2020. The series stars Kevin Hart as a fictionalized version of himself, with John Travolta, Nathalie Emmanuel and Josh Hartnett playing supporting roles in the first season. The series received seven nominations at the Primetime Emmy Awards for the actors' performances.

The first season was re-edited into a feature film (also titled Die Hart) released on Prime Video in February 2023. Following the success of the first season and the closure of Quibi, the second season was released on The Roku Channel in March 2023. Like its first season, the second season was re-edited into a feature film (titled Die Hart 2: Die Harter) released on Prime Video in May 2024.

== Cast and characters ==
=== Main ===
- Kevin Hart as himself, a Hollywood actor who wishes to become an action hero, and refuses to be seen as a laughing stock. He goes off on a talk show, which ultimately causes his career to plummet. He is offered a role in an action film directed by Claude and is forced to join an action star training camp led by Ron.
  - Hart also plays Doug Eubanks, his stunt double (season 2)
- John Travolta as Ron Wilcox (season 1), the owner and operator of an action star boot camp that Kevin becomes a student of, yet at the start of the series he openly dislikes Kevin.
- Nathalie Emmanuel as Jordan King, a female student who befriends Kevin despite their awkward relations. She mentions halfway through the series that she's from Chicago, but at the penultimate episodes she drops her American accent to reveal she's actually from Essex, UK.
- Josh Hartnett as himself (season 1), an actor who is friends with Ron, and a former student of his boot camp.
- Ben Schwartz as Andre (season 2), Kevin Hart's assistant, who is very loyal to Hart, despite his belittlement
- Paula Pell as Cynthia (season 2)
- John Cena as Mr. 206 (season 2)
- Anna Garcia as Pearl, a supposed Juilliard-trained actress who ingratiates herself with Kevin (season 3)
- Tony Cavalero as Agent Fisher, the FBI agent assigned to track down Kevin for murder (season 3)
- Kathryn Hahn as Jillian Jones, a famous character actress with impeccable skills of impersonation who wants to move into directing (season 3)
- J. K. Simmons as Jackson Pepper, a gruff, perfectionist Hollywood director and living legend who Kevin approaches for a role in his new film (season 3)

=== Recurring ===
- Jean Reno as Claude Van De Velde, the European director of Kevin's new film, who forces him to take part in a training camp to develop the skills needed to play an action hero (season 1)
- Brandon Quinn as Danny Morrison, Kevin’s manager.

== Episodes ==
=== Series overview ===
Season	Episodes	Originally released		
Season	Episodes	First released	Last released	Network
1	10	July 20, 2020	July 29, 2020	Quibi
2	8	March 31, 2023		The Roku Channel
3	7	December 13, 2024		The Roku Channel

=== Season 1 (2020) ===
No. overall	No. in season	Title	Directed by	Written by	Original release date	Prod. code
1	1	"The Recruit"	Eric Appel	Derek Kolstad & Tripper Clancy	July 20, 2020	101
Actor and comedian Kevin Hart unexpectedly goes off on a talk show on how he is unhappy that he is seen as a laughing stock, mocking his fans and the audience. His career goes sideways following the incident, but he is later offered a starring role in a new action film that could revive his career. Director of the film, Claude Van De Velde, insists he train at a strange, secluded action star boot camp before filming led by Ron Wilcox (John Travolta).
2	2	"Man on Fire"	Eric Appel	Derek Kolstad & Tripper Clancy	July 20, 2020	102
Kevin settles into the boot camp in undesirable conditions. Ron tests Kevin’s abilities by having him save a dummy version of himself from a burning building. Kevin barely escapes and Ron ridicules him.
3	3	"Wonder Woman"	Eric Appel	Derek Kolstad & Tripper Clancy	July 20, 2020	103
4	4	"Sex, Lies and Videotape"	Eric Appel	Derek Kolstad & Tripper Clancy	July 21, 2020	104
5	5	"The Truman Show"	Eric Appel	Derek Kolstad & Tripper Clancy	July 22, 2020	105
6	6	"The Godfather"	Eric Appel	Derek Kolstad & Tripper Clancy	July 23, 2020	106
7	7	"The Great Escape"	Eric Appel	Derek Kolstad & Tripper Clancy	July 24, 2020	107
8	8	"Bad Boys"	Eric Appel	Derek Kolstad & Tripper Clancy	July 27, 2020	108
9	9	"Live Free or Die Hard"	Eric Appel	Derek Kolstad & Tripper Clancy	July 28, 2020	109
10	10	"True Lies"	Eric Appel	Derek Kolstad & Tripper Clancy	July 29, 2020	110

=== Season 2 (2023) ===
No. overall	No. in season	Title	Directed by	Written by	Original release date
11	1	"Hart Broken"	Eric Appel	Tripper Clancy	March 31, 2023
12	2	"Escape From Hell"	Eric Appel	Tripper Clancy	March 31, 2023
13	3	"The Legend of Stromberg"	Eric Appel	Tripper Clancy	March 31, 2023
14	4	"Like Mother Like Son"	Eric Appel	Tripper Clancy	March 31, 2023
15	5	"The Famous Mondolvias"	Eric Appel	Tripper Clancy	March 31, 2023
16	6	"Episode Mr. 206"	Eric Appel	Tripper Clancy	March 31, 2023
17	7	"Licensed and Bonded"	Eric Appel	Tripper Clancy	March 31, 2023
18	8	"Face Off"	Eric Appel	Tripper Clancy	March 31, 2023

=== Season 3 (2024) ===
No. overall	No. in season	Title	Directed by	Written by	Original release date
19	1	"The Peanut Man"	Josh Ruben	Tripper Clancy	December 13, 2024
Kevin's attempt to take on a more challenging and dramatic role, the George Washington Carver biopic Peanut Man, fails miserably at the box office. He confesses to Danny that he wants to finally be recognized with an Oscar for his acting. For help, he meets with previous Oscar winner Jillian Jones as she engages in method acting for a role as a line cook. Despite slicing off the tip of her finger while distracted by Kevin's questions, Jillian sends him to meet with her friend, the legendary filmmaker Jackson Pepper. Jackson is unimpressed by Kevin and asks if he would be willing to "kill" for a shot at a role in his new movie. When Kevin says yes, Jackson attacks him and the actor winds up killing him in self-defense.
20	2	"The Relatively Small Package"	Josh Ruben	Tripper Clancy	December 13, 2024
For the last two years, Jordan, hoping to score a role in Jackson's movie, has committed numerous crimes as a professional cat burglar using her acting skills and combat training. Increasingly disillusioned with a life of crime, she complains to her agent; the agent's response is that working with Jackson Pepper is her only chance to rise above being an otherwise forgettable stage actor. Jordan's "handler" has her steal car keys from a locker at a bus station, during which she manages to outwit FBI Agent Fisher in a sting operation. Following a preprogrammed route in the car's navigation system, Jordan arrives at a mailbox containing instructions to act as getaway driver for a "screaming man". Just then, Kevin comes running up and asks her for help.
21	3	"The Fisher King"	Josh Ruben	Tripper Clancy	December 13, 2024
Both Jordan and Kevin are confused by each other's presence and start peppering the other with questions. Jordan admits that she is technically working for an audition with Jackson, to which Kevin confesses to having killed him. A shocked Jordan suggests going to the police, but Kevin refuses out of fear. Fisher takes control of the crime scene and quickly obtains evidence and video footage proving that Kevin is guilty of Jackson's murder. Jordan asks Kevin about his fear, and he notes that no black male actor would ever receive the benefit of the doubt from cops. When Jordan brings up O.J. Simpson, Kevin snaps and tries to wrest control of the car. This results in the pair striking a woman who steps in front of them and sending her flying.
22	4	"The Vacuum from Sarasota"	Josh Ruben	Tripper Clancy	December 13, 2024
Kevin places the seemingly dead woman in the car and takes over driving, but just as he and Jordan are arguing over whether to take the body to a hospital, the woman surprises them and reveals that she only injured her arm. Kevin pulls over and demands answers. The woman, who introduces herself as Pearl, says that she is also an actress who previously met with Jackson about his movie. In turn, Jackson instructed her to allow herself to be run over by Kevin and Jordan, and that if she survived, her role was to become their "rock". Thinking over what to do next, Kevin decides to check the crime scene of Jackson's murder. With no other options, he contacts Jimmy and is provided with a forensic cleaner's disguise and fake beard.
23	5	"The Legend of Lionel Pendergrass"	Josh Ruben	Tripper Clancy	December 13, 2024
Putting on Jimmy's disguise, Kevin uses method acting to assume the identity of "Lionel Pendergrass". Through a combination of fast talking and quick improvisation, "Lionel" is able to access the crime scene without an ID and soon runs into Fisher. He convinces Fisher that the area is being contaminated and that he needs immediate access to all the evidence gathered so far. While Fisher is distracted, Kevin slips into the bathroom and stuffs the physical evidence in a toilet before escaping with the videos. Jordan and Pearl have a heart-to-heart about their careers, and Jordan urges Pearl to not repeat her mistakes by letting others tell her what roles to take. Just then, Kevin returns; Fisher suddenly appears and takes the group into custody.
24	6	"The Face of Guffey Light"	Josh Ruben	Tripper Clancy	December 13, 2024
Fisher shoves Kevin in the trunk of his car while Pearl and Jordan are restrained and put in the back. As they drive off, Pearl confesses to Jordan that she is not, in fact, a trained actress, but simply wanted to impress her. Touched, Jordan admits her past crimes and wins Pearl's affection for "sharing her truth". Pearl also recognizes Fisher for his past work as an actor in beer commercials; this results in Fisher sharing his life story of being an aspiring actor so eager to win Jackson's approval that he joined the FBI and spent ten years "researching" a possible future role. Believing that his hard work is now in vain because of Kevin's meddling, he takes the group to a remote waste disposal plant and reveals his intention to murder them in an act of vengeance.
25	7	"The Code of Hammurabi"	Josh Ruben	Tripper Clancy	December 13, 2024
As Fisher prepares to kill him, Kevin performs an off-the-cuff, fully ad-libbed monologue while Jordan cuts through her restraints. Moved by Kevin's humility, Fisher is about to let him go only for Kevin to mock him by admitting that he made it all up. Jordan then punches him out cold and frees Kevin and Pearl. Jackson then appears and reveals that his "murder" was an elaborate deception using props and special effects, assisted by Jillian who used prosthetic makeup to disguise herself as a coroner. He explains his actions by stating that the group needed to demonstrate the ability to completely disappear into their roles, while coldly dismissing Fisher for "breaking character". Eighteen months later, Kevin, Pearl, and Jordan are all Oscar winners, while Jackson wins another Oscar for his directing. As the group celebrates, he excuses himself; it is then revealed that "Jackson" is actually Jillian in more prosthetics, having beat Jackson to death and taken his place to finally prove herself as a director.

== Production ==
On September 17, 2020, Quibi renewed the series for a second season. In January 2021, Quibi's content library was sold to Roku, Inc. for less than $100 million. The series was rebranded as a "Roku Original", and moved to The Roku Channel on May 20. Following viewership success, Roku renewed the series for a second season, which premiered on March 31, 2023.

When asked about the renewal at Roku, CEO of LOL Studios Jeff Clanagan said:

"The return of Die Hart marks a pivotal moment in the continued growth and expansion of LOL Studios. We’re excited for the opportunity to team up with Roku and be the first Roku Original to get a second season. We can’t wait for fans to dive into what is sure to be an even bigger, more action-packed season two."

In April 2023, the series was renewed for a third season, which premiered on December 13, 2024.

=== Casting ===
Kevin Hart stars as a fictionalized version of himself in all three seasons. The first season features John Travolta and Nathalie Emmanuel in supporting roles. On September 21, 2022, John Cena, Ben Schwartz and Paula Pell were cast in the second season in supporting roles, with Emmanuel confirmed to return alongside Hart.
