= Quibi =

American short-form mobile video platform

- Company type: Private
- Website type: OTT platform
- Founded: August 2018; 8 years ago
- Dissolved: December 1, 2020; 5 years ago
- Headquarters: Los Angeles, California, U.S.
- Area served: United States; Canada; United Kingdom (limited); Australia (limited); Germany (limited); Brazil (limited)
- Founder: Jeffrey Katzenberg
- Key people: Meg Whitman (CEO)
- Launched: April 6, 2020; 6 years ago
- Current status: Defunct

Quibi (/ˈkwɪbi/ KWIB-ee) was an American short-form streaming platform that generated content for viewing on mobile devices. It was founded in Los Angeles in August 2018 as NewTV by Jeffrey Katzenberg, and it was led by Meg Whitman as CEO. The service raised $1.75 billion from investors. It launched in April 2020, but shut down in December 2020 after falling short of its subscriber projections. In January 2021, Quibi's content library was sold to Roku, Inc. for less than $100 million. The platform's concepts and failure inspired widespread mockery.

== History ==
=== Pre-launch ===
Quibi was founded in August 2018 as NewTV by Jeffrey Katzenberg and was led by Meg Whitman as CEO. In October 2018, NewTV was renamed Quibi. The service targeted a younger demographic, with content delivered in 10-minute episodes called "quick bites" (with the name Quibi derived from "QUI-ck BI-tes"). In 2018, Quibi raised $1 billion in funding from major Hollywood film studios, TV companies, telecommunications companies, technology companies, banks, and other investors including The Walt Disney Company, 21st Century Fox, NBCUniversal, Sony Pictures, WarnerMedia, Viacom, RTL Group, FremantleMedia, eOne, Lionsgate Studios, MGM, Madrone Capital, Goldman Sachs, JPMorgan Chase, Alibaba Group, Liberty Global, and ITV.

In 2019, Quibi announced it would launch in April 2020 with two pricing tiers. On July 8, 2019, BBC Studios announced it had invested in Quibi. By late 2019, Quibi announced it had sold out its first-year advertising inventory, which amounted to $150 million.

In 2020, Quibi presented at CES on its full launch plans including details on its content, technology, and partnerships. In March 2020, Quibi announced a partnership with Canadian telecommunications company BCE, whereby its Bell Media division would produce Canadian news and sports content for the service (via CTV News and TSN respectively), and Bell Mobility would be Quibi's exclusive Canadian telecom marketing partner.

=== Launch ===
Quibi launched on April 6, 2020. It was available in the United States and Canada. An ad-free U.S. version of the app was made available in the United Kingdom, Ireland, Australia, and Germany among others on April 6, 2020. TechCrunch reported that Quibi saw 300,000 downloads and "hit No. 3 in the App Store" on its launch day. On April 14, the company announced it had seen 1.7 million downloads of its app in its release week. In the Google Play store, Quibi was the 11th-most-downloaded app as of April 16.

Quibi's app fell out of the list of the 50 most-downloaded free iPhone apps in the United States a week after it was released. According to the analytics firm Sensor Tower, by early May the app was ranked 125th. Sensor Tower also said the app had been installed by 2.9 million customers, although Quibi said the figure was closer to 3.5 million. Of those who had installed the app, Quibi said 1.3 million were active users. Katzenberg acknowledged the performance was "not close to what we wanted," stating, "I attribute everything that has gone wrong to coronavirus"—a reference to the COVID-19 pandemic that was disrupting daily routines at the time of the launch. Whitman was more positive in her assessment of the launch.

Moves were made to adjust the service by allowing users to share content on social media platforms and to watch shows on televisions in addition to phones. A feature was added to allow shows to be cast from phones onto TVs through AirPlay and Chromecast, with the screen orientation being set to landscape by default. Quibi also developed its own screenshotting function.

By early June, the company implemented voluntary executive pay cuts. That same month, the service was on track for 2 million subscribers in its first year, far below its projected 7.4 million total. From January to mid-June, Quibi raised an additional $750 million in funding. In July 2020, Sensor Tower reported that about 8 percent of Quibi's early wave of users had converted into paying subscribers, while the subscription analytics firm Antenna reported that 27% of "Quibi day 1, 90-day trial users converted their trials," though Quibi stated that these numbers were inaccurate.

In early August, a free, ad-supported version of the service was released in Australia and New Zealand, and the price of the ad-free version was reduced. According to reports in The Wall Street Journal and Recode in September 2020, the platform was looking for a potential acquirer with other possibilities, such as raising more funds, or becoming a public company by backing into a shell corporation. The report stated Quibi had $200 million in funds available.

In October, Quibi was made available on Apple TV, Amazon Fire TV, and Google TV.

=== Shutdown ===
On October 21, 2020, just six months after Quibi's launch, The Wall Street Journal reported that the streaming service was shutting down. Later, that same day, this news was confirmed by both Katzenberg and Whitman. Katzenberg told Deadline Hollywood, "There was no question that keeping us going was not going to have a different outcome, it was just going to spend a whole lot more money without any value to show for it. So, out of respect for these people that put up this extraordinary amount of capital to do it, that's irresponsible and we both felt we shouldn't do it." In the interview, Katzenberg also cited the unfortunate timing of the launch during the pandemic as a contributing factor. At the time of the announcement, Quibi had approximately 500,000 subscribers.

On October 22, it was announced that Quibi would officially shut down "on or around" December 1.

=== Fate of the library ===
The announcement of the shutdown left the fate of existing, upcoming, and planned original programming unclear, as Quibi did not own the rights to any of their programming, since their deals with the creators of their original programming allowed them to retain the copyright to their content and distribute it in traditional forms after a few years.

On January 8, 2021, Roku announced that all of Quibi's 75 programs would be streamed on their platform, The Roku Channel. Roku acquired the content from Quibi for an amount less than $100 million, with the condition that the content would remain in their short-form format. The shows would be rebranded as "Roku Originals", with 30 of them published on the service on May 20, 2021.

== Content ==
Quibi spent over $1 billion on commissioning original content in its first year, totalling 8,500 short-form episodes and including over 175 shows. Unlike many streaming video platforms, Quibi's content was made specifically for mobile devices and could be viewed in either a traditional 16:9 horizontal aspect ratio, or a 9:16 vertical frame (with the user able to shift between them in the same video). Instead of half-hour TV episodes or two-hour films, content on Quibi was delivered in episodes of 10 minutes or less.

Quibi commissioned news programming in addition to its entertainment line-up, but found the news shows to be attracting minimal interest.

In July 2020, Quibi was nominated for 10 Emmy Awards across three categories: Outstanding Short Form Comedy or Drama Series, Outstanding Actor in a Short Form Comedy or Drama Series, and Outstanding Actress in a Short Form Comedy or Drama Series. Its series #FreeRayshawn won two Emmy Awards on September 20, 2020.

== Legal issues ==
Quibi filed a lawsuit against interactive video developer Eko on March 9, 2020 seeking a declaration that Quibi did not infringe on Eko's patented technology, as well as an order that Eko withdraw a complaint filed with Apple's App Store and unspecified monetary damages. Quibi pre-emptively filed its lawsuit, Quibi Holdings, LLC v. Interlude US, Inc. (d/b/a Eko), in the United States District Court for the Central District of California. Eko filed its own separate but related countersuit, JBF Interlude 2009 Ltd – Israel v. Quibi Holdings, LLC, a day later, alleging that Quibi stole proprietary technology after Eko demonstrated it to Quibi's employees, including Katzenberg.

On May 3, 2020, Elliott Management announced that it would fund Eko's lawsuit in exchange for equity in the company.
