= J. B. Smoove =

American actor (born 1965)

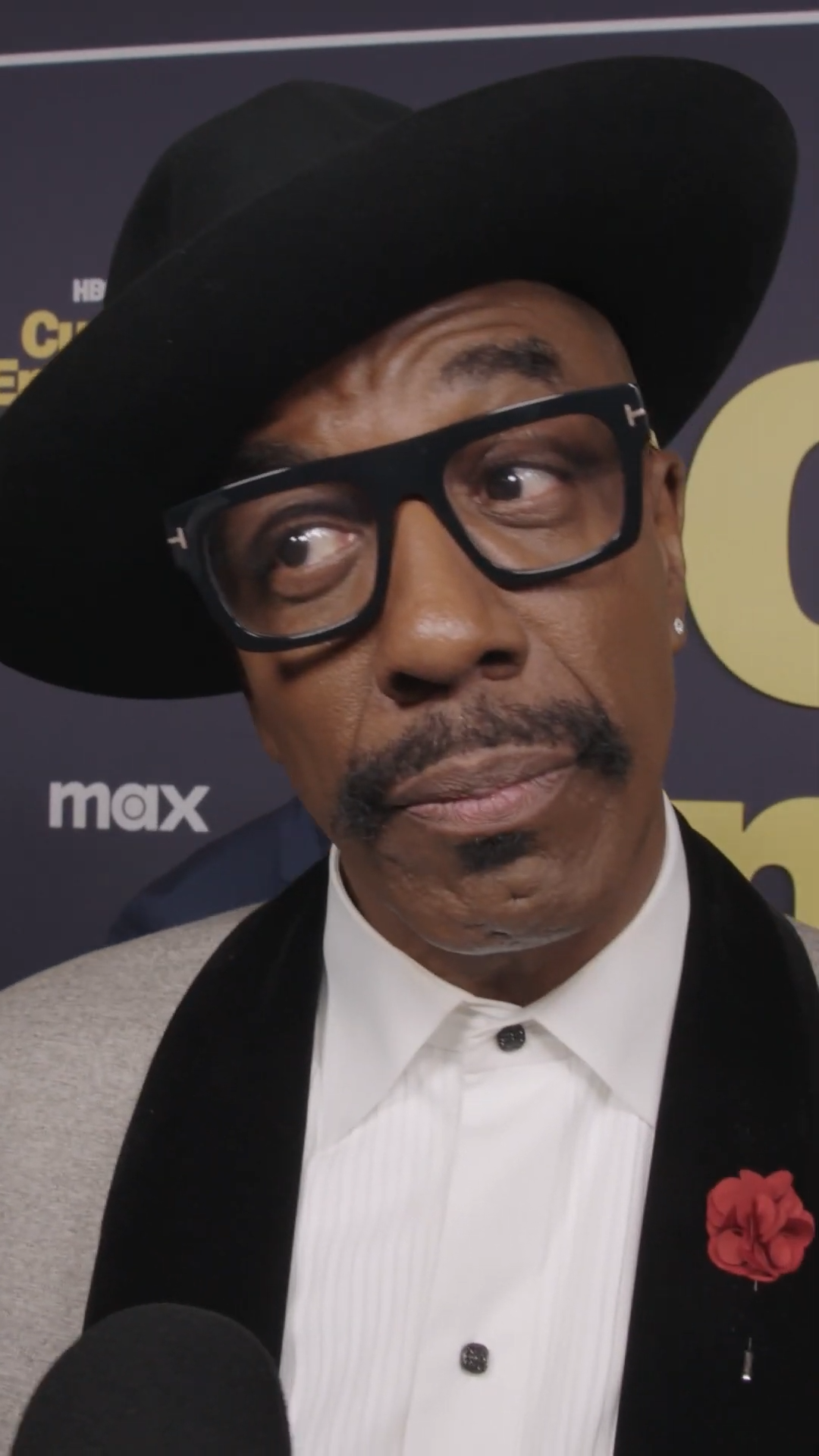
- Smoove in February 2024
- Born: Jerry Angelo Brooks; December 16, 1965 (age 60); Plymouth, North Carolina, U.S.
- Occupations: Actor; comedian; writer
- Years active: 1991–present
- Spouse: Shahidah Omar (m. 2007)
- Children: 1

Jerry Angelo Brooks (born December 16, 1965), known professionally as J. B. Smoove, is an American comedian, actor, and writer. After beginning his career in 1995 on HBO's Def Comedy Jam, he was a writer and performer on NBC's Saturday Night Live (2003–2006). He is known for his starring roles on Fox sitcom 'Til Death (2006–2010), HBO comedy series Curb Your Enthusiasm (2007–2024) and the CBS sitcom The Millers (2013–2015). He also portrayed Julius Dell in the Marvel Cinematic Universe (MCU) superhero films Spider-Man: Far From Home (2019) and in the sequel Spider-Man: No Way Home (2021).

== Early life ==
Jerry Angelo Brooks was born on December 16, 1965, in Plymouth, North Carolina. His parents are Elizabeth and Floyd Brooks. From the time he was three years old, he grew up in Mount Vernon, New York, a suburb of New York City. He spent a significant amount of time with his mother and extended maternal family in the Plymouth area, which he has said inspired much of his pursuit of comedy and comedy style. He resided in the Levister Towers housing projects in Mount Vernon with his two younger brothers. His father died from diabetes when Smoove was 15 years old.

In 1983, Smoove graduated from Mount Vernon High School. He attended Norfolk State University in Virginia, studying engineering and graphic design.

== Career ==
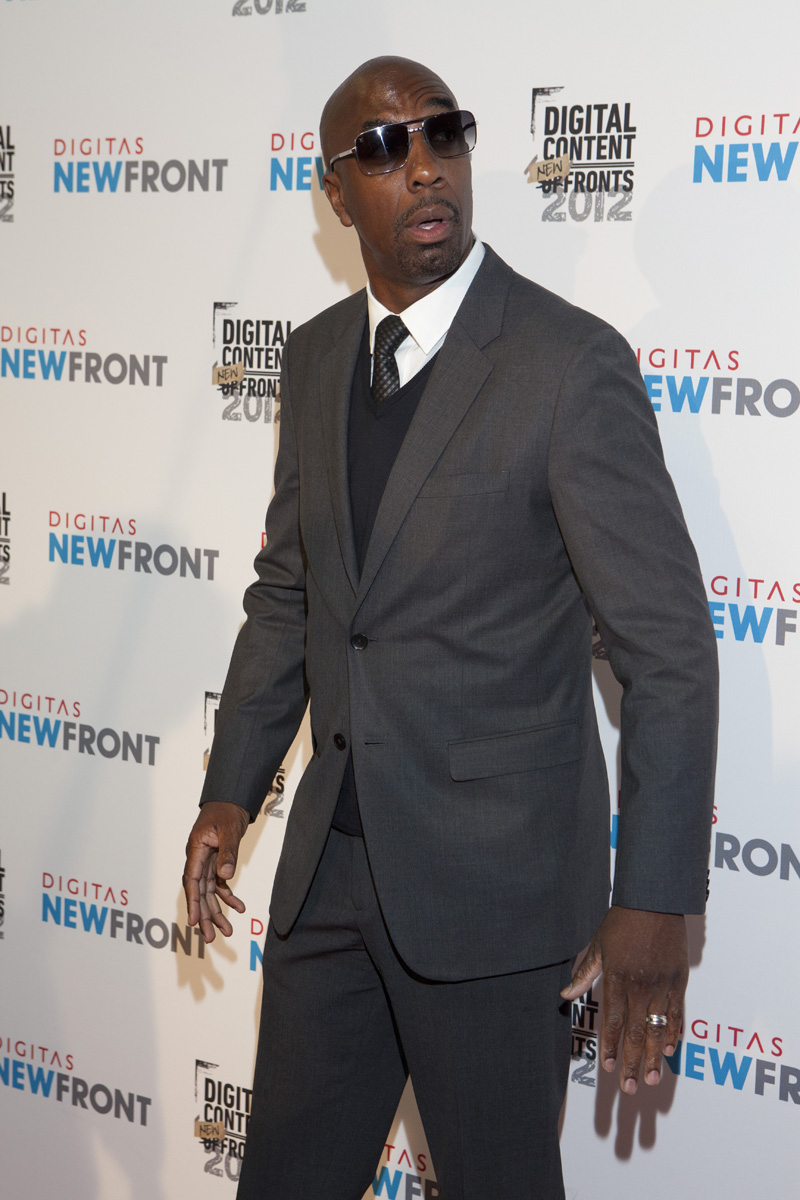
Smoove in 2012

Smoove worked as a perfume formulator and sold fire extinguishers door-to-door.

He began his show business career in stand-up comedy, which is when he shortened his name, Jerry Brooks, to "J. B." and added "Smoove" as his last name. He has landed recurring roles on Everybody Hates Chris and Saturday Night Live. On SNL, he worked as a writer (and had bit roles in sketches, including playing Jimmy "JJ" Walker in a parody of the 1970s sitcom Good Times) and was a recipient of the 2007 Writers Guild of America award for Best Comedy/Variety Series (Including Talk). He worked on Saturday Night Live for three years.

Smoove was a regular cast member on the HBO comedy Curb Your Enthusiasm beginning in its sixth season in 2007, playing Leon Black. Smoove landed the role after his stint on SNL. Although at that time he lived on the East Coast, he visited Los Angeles for the funeral of his friend, music producer Oji Pierce, enabling him to audition for Curb Your Enthusiasm.

Smoove wrote a book as his Curb Your Enthusiasm character, Leon, which was released on October 10, 2017.

He had a major role for seasons two and three on the FOX network sitcom 'Til Death with Brad Garrett and Joely Fisher. In June 2008, he appeared in several episodes of The Gong Show with Dave Attell as one of the celebrity judges. Smoove was also a cast member on the short-lived sketch comedy program Cedric the Entertainer Presents. He hosted the standup comedy series Russell Simmons Presents: Stand-Up at The El Rey on Comedy Central in July 2010, and also appeared in The Simpsons episode "Angry Dad: The Movie" in February 2011. That same year, he starred in the American Dad! episode "The Worst Stan", and appeared in the episode "Dude, Where's My Wade" in Kick Buttowski: Suburban Daredevil.

In 2012, his first televised comedy special, JB Smoove: That's How I Dooz It, premiered on Comedy Central. The DVD of the special was released April 3, 2012. In 2013, Smoove voiced Hackus in The Smurfs 2. He appeared in Movie 43 in the segment "The Proposition" alongside Anna Faris and Chris Pratt. He was the substitute co-host of the New York City morning talk show Good Day New York with Rosanna Scotto on April 9, 2012. He made a cameo appearance as a gravedigger in "Barney/Never", an episode of Louie. He also played a supporting role in Season 4, Episode 7, "The Vapora Sport" in the American sitcom The League on FX. He plays Wheelchair Guy, with whom the main characters have recurring comedic run-ins. He was in the show Real Husbands of Hollywood, playing a fictionalized version of himself.

Smoove hosts Four Courses with J.B. Smoove, a talk show on the MSG Network. He provides the voice of Dr. Ray De Angelo Harris, host of the Chakra Attack radio show in the video game Grand Theft Auto V. Smoove appeared in the 2013 film Dealin' with Idiots as Coach Ted. In 2013, he became a regular cast member of the CBS comedy The Millers as Ray.

In the summer of 2014, Smoove hosted the eighth season of the NBC reality series Last Comic Standing. Smoove appeared on comedian Jerry Seinfeld's web series Comedians in Cars Getting Coffee in July 2016. Also in 2016, Smoove appeared in the web series Epic Rap Battles of History, portraying abolitionist Frederick Douglass.

Smoove played Santa Claus in Sia's 2017 music video, "Santa's Coming for Us". He played Julius Dell in the Marvel Studios feature film Spider-Man: Far From Home (2019) and its sequel Spider-Man: No Way Home (2021). In 2020, Smoove starred in Mapleworth Murders opposite Paula Pell (another former writer for Saturday Night Live) and John Lutz for Quibi, which was produced by, among others, Lorne Michaels and Seth Meyers of SNL. Beginning in the fall of 2021, Smoove played a recurring role as the titular Caesar in multiple commercials for the Caesars Sportsbook mobile app, appearing alongside Patton Oswalt, Halle Berry, Vince Vaughn, and the Manning family.

In 2019, Smoove played for the "Home" roster during the NBA All-Star Celebrity Game at the Bojangles' Coliseum in Charlotte, North Carolina. The roster was made up of celebrities with Carolina roots.

Smoove and Miles Grose co-host and created May I Elaborate? Daily Wisdom from JB Smoove, a podcast that debuted in April 2021 on the Team Coco podcast network.

In 2019, Smoove attended the final dinner service of reality TV series Hell's Kitchen's eighteenth season Hell's Kitchen: Rookies vs. Veterans as a chef's table guest in the blue kitchen that was run by runner-up Mia Castro. He appeared as a guest judge on the first season of the FOX reality singing competition The Masked Singer. He voiced Frank in Harley Quinn beginning in 2019.

== Charity work ==
Smoove serves on the board of directors of the Boys & Girls Club of Mount Vernon, New York. On November 7, 2017, he emceed the Boys and Girls Clubs Future Leaders Gala at The Beverly Hilton in Beverly Hills, California.

== Honors and awards ==
Smoove won the 2021 Primetime Emmy Award for Outstanding Actor in a Short Form Comedy or Drama Series for his role in Mapleworth Murders.

== Personal life ==
In 2007, Smoove married singer Shahidah Omar. They reside in Los Angeles. He has an adult daughter named Jerrica from a previous relationship.

He is a fan of the New York Knicks, New York Yankees and the New York Jets.

He has been vegan since 2018.

== Performance media ==
=== Comedy specials ===
Year	Title	Role	Notes
2012	JB Smoove: That's How I Dooz It	Self	

=== Podcasts ===
Year	Title	Role	Notes
2012	WTF with Marc Maron	Self	Episode 295
2021–2022	May I Elaborate? Daily Wisdom from JB Smoove	Self	

=== Films ===
Year	Title	Role	Notes
1997	Lesser Prophets	Chucky	
1998	Tomorrow Night	Mel the Mailman	
2001	Pootie Tang	Trucky	
2002	Mr. Deeds	Reuben	
2003	With or Without You	Darnell	
2003	The Watermelon Heist	Numbers	
2004	Gas	Ignatius	
2009	Frankenhood	Leon	
2009	Hurricane Season	Team Bus Driver	
2010	Date Night	Cabbie	
2011	Hall Pass	Flats	
2011	We Bought a Zoo	Mr. Stevens	
2011	The Sitter	Julio	
2012	Think Like a Man	Bartender	
2012	The Dictator	Funeral Usher	
2013	Movie 43	Larry	Segment: "The Proposition"
2013	A Haunted House	Kisha's Dad	
2013	Dealin' with Idiots	Coach Ted	
2013	The Smurfs 2	Hackus	Voice
2013	Clear History	Jaspar	
2014	Search Party	Berk	
2014	Top Five	Silk	
2015	Hell and Back	Sal the Demon	Voice
2016	Barbershop: The Next Cut	One-Stop	
2016	Almost Christmas	Lonnie	
2017	The Polka King	Ron Edwards	
2018	Uncle Drew	Angelo	
2019	Spider-Man: Far From Home	Julius Dell	
2019	The Jesus Rolls	The Mechanic	
2021	On the Count of Three	Lyndell	
2021	Spider-Man: No Way Home	Julius Dell	
2023	Back on the Strip	Amos	
2024	Música	Anwar	

=== Television ===
Year	Title	Role	Notes
1995	Def Comedy Jam	Himself	Also writer
1998	Law & Order	Levon	Episode: "Bait"
2002–2003	Cedric the Entertainer Presents	Various	Main role
2003	Ed	Alvin	Episode: "Second Chances"
2003–2006	Saturday Night Live	Various	Also writer
2004–2013	Jimmy Kimmel Live!	Himself	Recurring role
2005	Ego Trip's Race-O-Rama	Himself	Documentary
2007–2008	Everybody Hates Chris	Manny	Recurring role
2007–2011	Comics Unleashed	Himself	3 episodes
2007–2024	Curb Your Enthusiasm	Leon Black	Recurring role (seasons 6–8); Main (seasons 9–12)
2008	Carpoolers	Parking Attendant	Episode: "Wheel of Fortune"
2008	The Gong Show with Dave Attell	Himself	4 episodes
2008	Talkshow with Spike Feresten	Himself	Episode: "J. B. Smoove"
2008–2010	'Til Death	Kenny Westchester	Main role
2008–2013	The Tonight Show with Jay Leno	Himself	Recurring role
2009	The Wanda Sykes Show	Himself	1 episode
2009	Castle	Norman Jessup	Episode: "Love Me Dead"
2009–2021	American Dad!	Airport Security Guard, Radio Station Security Guard, Guy #1, Tracey Bryant	Voice, 6 episodes
2010	America's Next Top Model	Himself	Episode: "America's Next Top Vampire"
2010	Glenn Martin DDS	Curtis, Uncle Dexter	Voice, episode: "Step Brother"
2010	The Bonnie Hunt Show	Himself	1 episode
2010	Late Night with Jimmy Fallon	Himself	1 episode
2010	Lopez Tonight	Himself	1 episode
2011	The Marriage Ref	Himself	Episode: "Rachael Ray, Larry Miller, J. B. Smoove"
2011	The Simpsons	DJ Kwanzaa	Voice, episode: "Angry Dad: The Movie"
2011	In the Flow with Affion Crockett	iDaddy	Episode: "Put the Kids to Bed"
2011–2013	Funny as Hell	—N/a	Writer; 2 episodes
2011–2017	Conan	Himself	Recurring role
2012–2014	Last Call with Carson Daly	Himself	2 episodes
2012	Watch What Happens: Live	Himself	Episode: "J. B. Smoove and Shannon Elizabeth"
2012	Black Dynamite	That Frog Kurtis, That Bastard Kurtis	Voice, 2 episodes
2012	Bent	Clem	Main role
2012	Louie	Gravedigger #2	Episode: "Barney/Never"
2012	Robot Chicken	B.A. Baracus, Satan	Voice, episode: "Crushed by a Steamroller on My 53rd Birthday"
2012	The League	DeRon	Episode: "The Vapora Sport"
2012–2013	The Burn with Jeff Ross	Himself	2 episodes
2012–2015	The Wendy Williams Show	Himself	4 episodes
2013	Four Courses with JB Smoove	Himself (host)	
2013	Kroll Show	Basketball Player	Episode: "Dine & Dash"
2013	Chicago Fire	Sergeant Pruit	Episode: "Let Her Go"
2013	The Arsenio Hall Show	Himself	2 episodes
2013	The Talk	Himself	Episode: "The Cast of "The Millers"/Sunny Anderson"
2013	Katie	Himself	Episode: "Exclusives with Real Husbands of Hollywood/Nelly Performs"
2013–2015	The Millers	Ray	Main role
2013–2016, 2022	Real Husbands of Hollywood	Himself	Main role
2014	Chicago P.D.	Sergeant Pruit	Episode: "Stepping Stone"
2014	Last Comic Standing	Himself (host)	Main role
2014–2016	Talking Dead	Himself	2 episodes
2014–2017	Teenage Mutant Ninja Turtles	Anton Zeck / Bebop	Voice, main role
2015	The Soul Man	Terrell	Episode: "Oh Snow You Didn't"
2015–2016	Fresh Off the Boat	Barry	2 episodes
2016	Epic Rap Battles of History	Frederick Douglass	Episode: "Frederick Douglass vs Thomas Jefferson"
2016	Match Game	Himself	2 episodes
2016	Transparent	Porter	Episode: "Elizah"
2016–2017	Life in Pieces	Darryl	2 episodes
2016	Chopped Junior	Himself	Episode: "Dinner Is Served"
2018	Desus & Mero	Himself	1 episode
2018	New Girl	Van Bishop	Episode: "Godparents"
2018–2019	3Below: Tales of Arcadia	Phil	Voice, 10 episodes
2019	Hell's Kitchen	Himself	Episode: "The Grand Finale"
2019	The Masked Singer	Himself	Episode: "All Together Now"
2019–2025	Harley Quinn	Frank the Plant	Voice, main role
2020	The Last O.G.	Carl	4 episodes
2020	Mapleworth Murders	Chief Billy Bills	9 episodes Primetime Emmy Award for Outstanding Actor in a Short Form Comedy or Drama Series
2020–2022	Woke	Marker	Voice, 16 episodes
2021	Mr. Mayor	TikTok Voice	Voice, episode: "#PalmTreeReform"
2021	Crank Yankers	Philip Johnson	Voice, 2 episodes
2021–2022	Fairfax	Quattro the Pigeon	Voice, 15 episodes
2022	Pivoting	The Fig	Voice, episode: "The Giving Tree"
2022	Beat Bobby Flay	Himself; guest host	Episode: "Smoove Moves"
2022	Teen Titans Go!	Black Manta	Voice, 2 episodes
2022	Blockbuster	Percy Scott	Recurring role; 8 episodes
2023	History of the World, Part II	Luke	4 episodes
2024	Good Times: Black Again	Reggie	Voice, 10 episodes
2024	Kite Man: Hell Yeah!	Frank the Plant	Voice, episode: "Just Right, Hell Yeah!"
2026	Life, Larry and the Pursuit of Unhappiness	Jonesey	Episode: "McCarthy"

=== Video games ===
Year	Title	Role
2013	Grand Theft Auto V	Dr. Ray De Angelo Harris
2016	Teenage Mutant Ninja Turtles: Portal Power	Bebop
2022	High on Life	Gus
2026	High on Life 2	Gus
2026	Grand Theft Auto VI	The Local Population
