= John Lutz =

American comedian and screenwriter

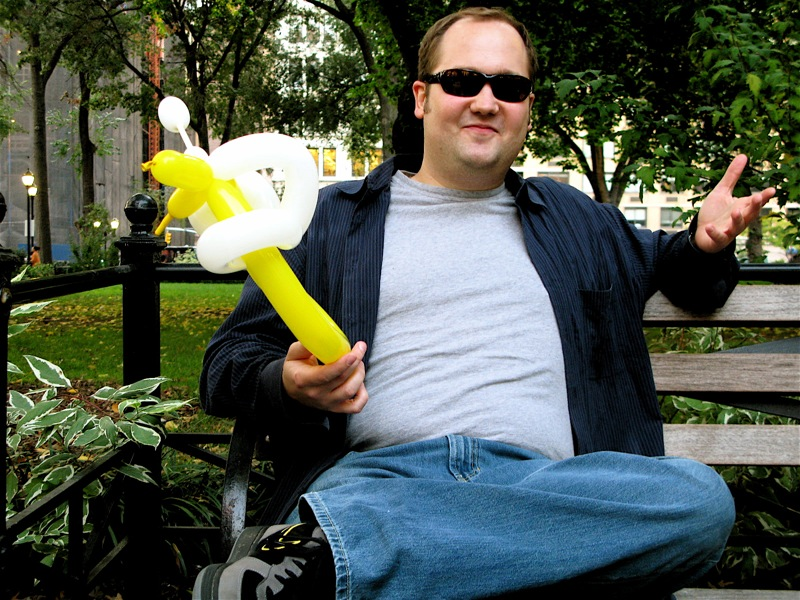
- Lutz in 2007
- Born: John Lutz
- Occupations: Actor, comedian, screenwriter
- Years active: 2001–present
- Spouse: Sue Galloway (m. 2009)
- Children: 2

John Lutz is an American actor, comedian, and screenwriter. He is best known for playing J. D. Lutz on the NBC sitcom 30 Rock, and for his work as a writer on the NBC series Saturday Night Live for seven seasons. In 2014, he joined the writing staff of the NBC late-night talk show Late Night with Seth Meyers.

== Career ==
Lutz began his professional career as a writer-performer with Chicago's ImprovOlympic and The Second City theaters. He was hired at NBC's Saturday Night Live in February 2004 after spending three years touring with Second City. NBC flew him in first-class to New York for a face-to-face interview with Lorne Michaels, the creator and executive producer of the sketch comedy show.

During this time, he has also appeared in small roles on SNL. Lutz played the role of J. D. Lutz on the NBC sitcom 30 Rock. Lutz left SNL in 2010, after becoming a main cast member during 30 Rock's 4th season, and he stayed until the series completion in January 2013. His character was an ostensibly part-Inuit and apparently bisexual sketch comedy writer from Alaska often targeted by his co-workers for his meek demeanor.

Lutz made frequent appearances in the long-running hit improv show ASSSSCAT 3000 at the Upright Citizens Brigade Theater in New York City.

Starting in November 2010, Lutz has been performing at the Upright Citizens Brigade Theatre in New York with fellow 30 Rock star Scott Adsit in the two-man improv show John and Scott. He and Scott perform long-form improv with a single suggestion from an audience member. The show has been very successful and is still running as of September, 2026.

On October 17, 2011, he appeared in an episode of The Good Wife.

Lutz wrote a radio play titled Escape from Virtual Island released on Audible in April 2020. The voice cast includes Paul Rudd, Jack McBrayer, Paula Pell and Jane Krakowski.

In 2020, Lutz starred in, co-wrote, and executive produced Mapleworth Murders, a comedy-mystery series for Quibi, opposite Paula Pell.

== Personal life ==
Lutz is married to Saturday Night Live contributor and 30 Rock co-star Sue Galloway, with whom he has two children.

== Filmography ==
=== Acting ===
Year(s)	Title	Role	Notes
2004–2010	Saturday Night Live	Occasional roles	19 episodes
2006–2013	30 Rock	J.D. Lutz	77 episodes
2008	Stick it in Detroit	Justin Rose	
2008	Human Giant	Detective Joseph DeCarlo	1 episode
2009	Mystery Team	Frank	
2009	Splinterheads	Guinness Man	
2011	Friends with Kids	Jason's Colleague at Work	
2011, 2012	The Good Wife	Eddie Kolakowski	2 episodes
2012	Sleepwalk with Me	Chip	
2014	The Awesomes	Mr. Stone	Episode: "Secret Santa"
2015	Sisters	Joel Barme	
2016	Odd Squad: The Movie	Weird Team Member	
2016	The Comedian	Mark Chapin	
2018	Drunk History	Himself	
2018	Most Likely to Murder	Corey	
2020	Mapleworth Murders	Gilbert Pewntz	
2022–2024	Girls5eva	Percy	7 episodes
2024	Loot	Nicholas' father	Episode: "Vengeance Falls"
2026	Not Suitable For Work	Warren	4 episodes

=== Writing ===
Year(s)	Title	Notes
2004–2010	Saturday Night Live	Hired midway through season 29 (2003–04)
2008–2009	Saturday Night Live Weekend Update Thursday	
2014–present	Late Night with Seth Meyers	Also performer
2020	Mapleworth Murders	
