= Greta Lee =

American actress (born 1983)

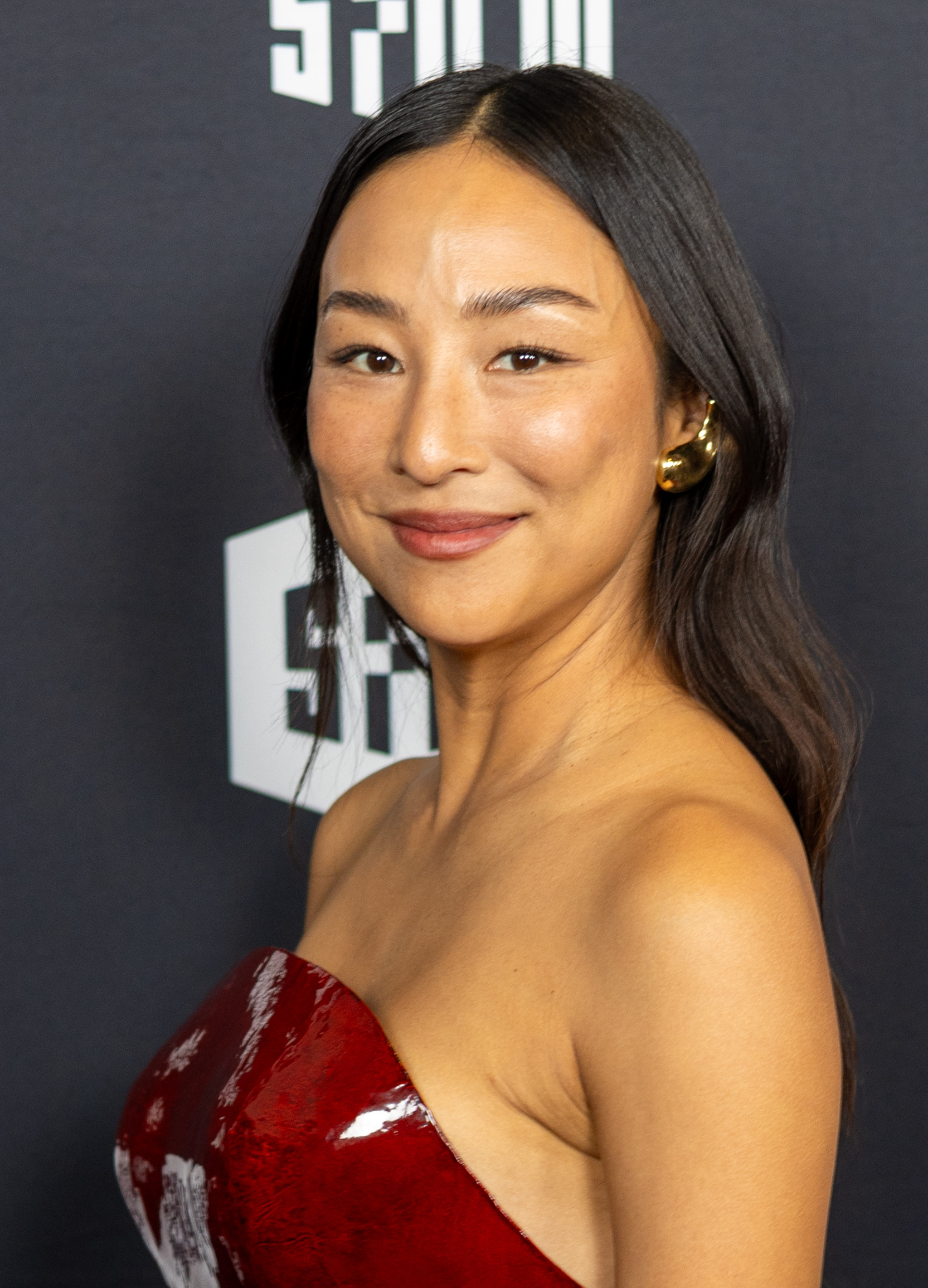
- Lee in 2026
- Born: March 7, 1983 (age 43); Los Angeles, California, U.S.
- Education: Northwestern University (BA)
- Occupation: Actress
- Years active: 2005–present
- Spouse: Russ Armstrong (m. 2014)
- Children: 2

Greta Lee (born March 7, 1983) is an American actress. She had main roles in the Netflix comedy-drama series Russian Doll (2019–2022) and the Apple TV+ drama series The Morning Show (2021–2025). The latter earned her a nomination for the Primetime Emmy Award for Outstanding Supporting Actress in a Drama Series. She gained prominence for her starring role in the romantic drama film Past Lives (2023), for which she received a nomination for a Golden Globe Award for Best Actress.

Lee's other film roles include Problemista (2023), Tron: Ares (2025), Late Fame (2025), and A House of Dynamite (2025). She voiced roles such as Lyla in Spider-Man: Into the Spider-Verse (2018) and Spider-Man: Across the Spider-Verse (2023) and Lilypad in the Pixar animated film Toy Story 5 (2026). Also known for her roles in theater, Lee made her Broadway debut in the musical comedy The 25th Annual Putnam County Spelling Bee (2007). She starred in the 2010 revival of the comedic play La Bête on Broadway and in the West End and the Amy Herzog play 4000 Miles (2011) at Lincoln Center Theatre.

== Life and career ==
=== Early years and education ===
Lee was born on March 7, 1983, in Los Angeles, California to South Korean immigrants. While attending Harvard-Westlake School, she became interested in the performing arts. After high school, she studied theater at Northwestern University. She then moved to New York City to pursue acting.

=== Acting career ===
Lee made her television debut in 2006 playing Heather Kim in the Law & Order: Special Victims Unit episode "Taboo". The following year Lee made her Broadway debut as high-achieving, multilingual honor student Marcy Park (replacement) in the musical comedy The 25th Annual Putnam County Spelling Bee. Lee returned to Broadway, portraying Dorine in the David Hirson comedy La Bête (2010) at the Music Box Theatre. Lee acted alongside Mark Rylance, David Hyde Pierce, and Joanna Lumley. She reprised her role in the West End production at the Harold Pinter Theatre.

During this time, she had recurring television roles including Heidi in the HBO comedy-drama series High Maintenance from 2012 to 2018, a nurse in Showtime's dark comedy series Nurse Jackie from 2012 to 2013 and as Soojin in Lena Dunham's HBO series Girls from 2013 to 2014. She was a guest star in the TV shows New Girl and Wayward Pines. She also acted in numerous films, playing Hae Won in the comedy Sisters (2015) alongside Tina Fey and Amy Poehler and Amy Lee in the drama Money Monster starring George Clooney and Julia Roberts. Lee continued to act in television shows such as Ruby in the Fox mystery science-fiction series Wayward Pines, Lucy in the Hulu series Chance, and Amber Wood-Lutz in the CBS/Paramount+ legal drama series The Good Fight.

Lee gained prominence for her roles as Maxine in the Netflix comedy-drama series Russian Doll and as Stella Bak in the Apple TV+ drama series The Morning Show, the latter of which earned her nominations for a Primetime Emmy Award for Outstanding Supporting Actress in a Drama Series and two Screen Actors Guild Awards for Outstanding Performance by an Ensemble in a Drama Series along with the cast. In 2020, she portrayed Princess Vicky of Valdroggia in Miracle Workers: Dark Ages, Celeste in What We Do in the Shadows, and Ellen Jones in The Twilight Zone. From 2021 to 2023, she played Bubbles as well as various voice roles in the Fox animated sitcom HouseBroken. She voiced Lyla in a post-credits scene of the animated film Spider-Man: Into the Spider-Verse, a role she reprised in its 2023 sequel Spider-Man: Across the Spider-Verse. In 2021, Lee was reported to be working on a TV adaptation of the book Minor Feelings by Cathy Park Hong for A24.

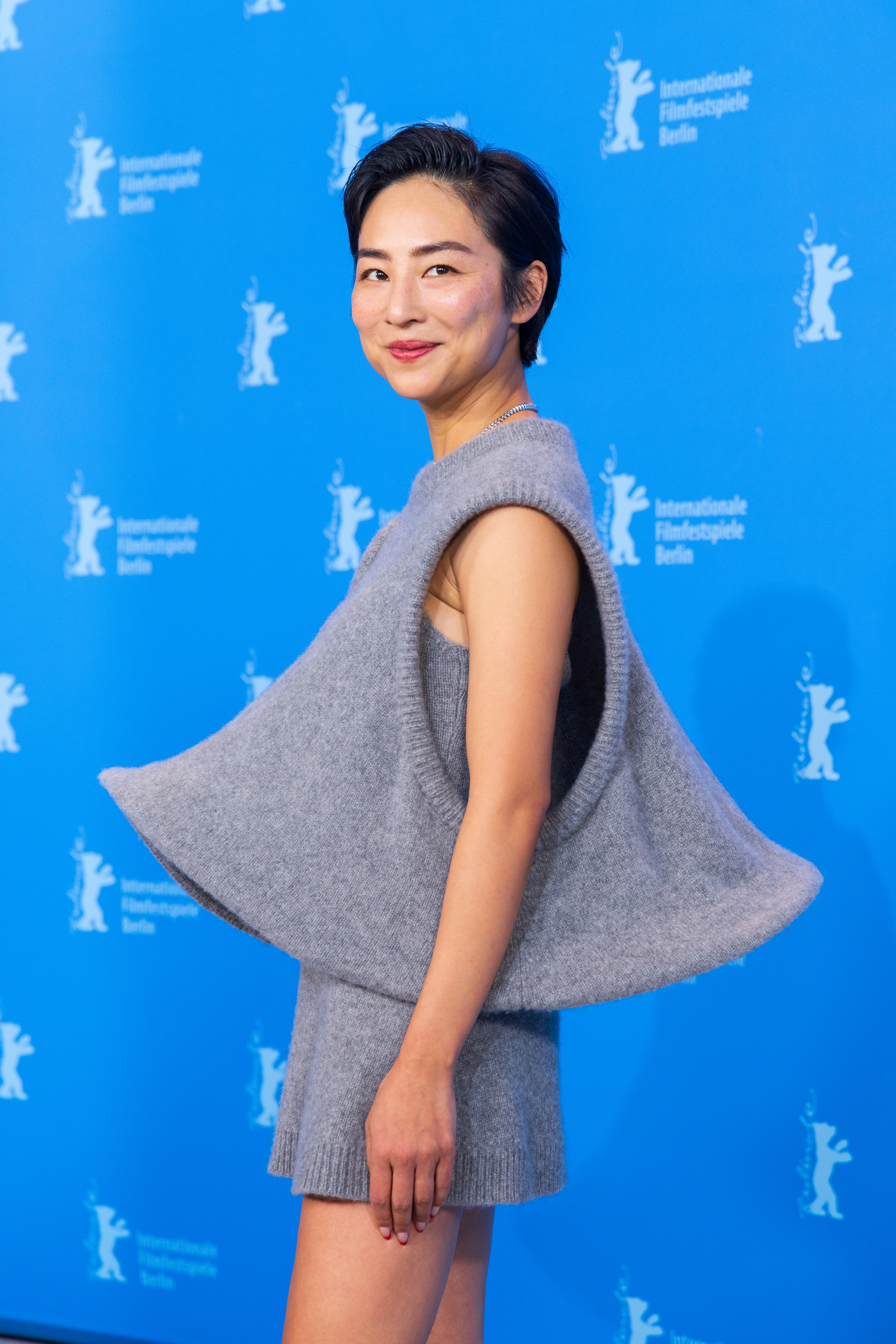
Lee promoting Past Lives at Berlinale in 2023

Lee gained critical acclaim for her starring role in the 2023 Celine Song–directed romantic film Past Lives playing Nora, a woman who reconnects with her childhood friend from South Korea. Lee won the Hollywood Critics Association Midseason Film Award for Best Actress for her performance in the film. Moreover, she also received nominations for the Golden Globe Award for Best Actress in a Motion Picture – Drama, the Critics' Choice Movie Award for Best Actress and the Independent Spirit Award for Best Lead Performance.

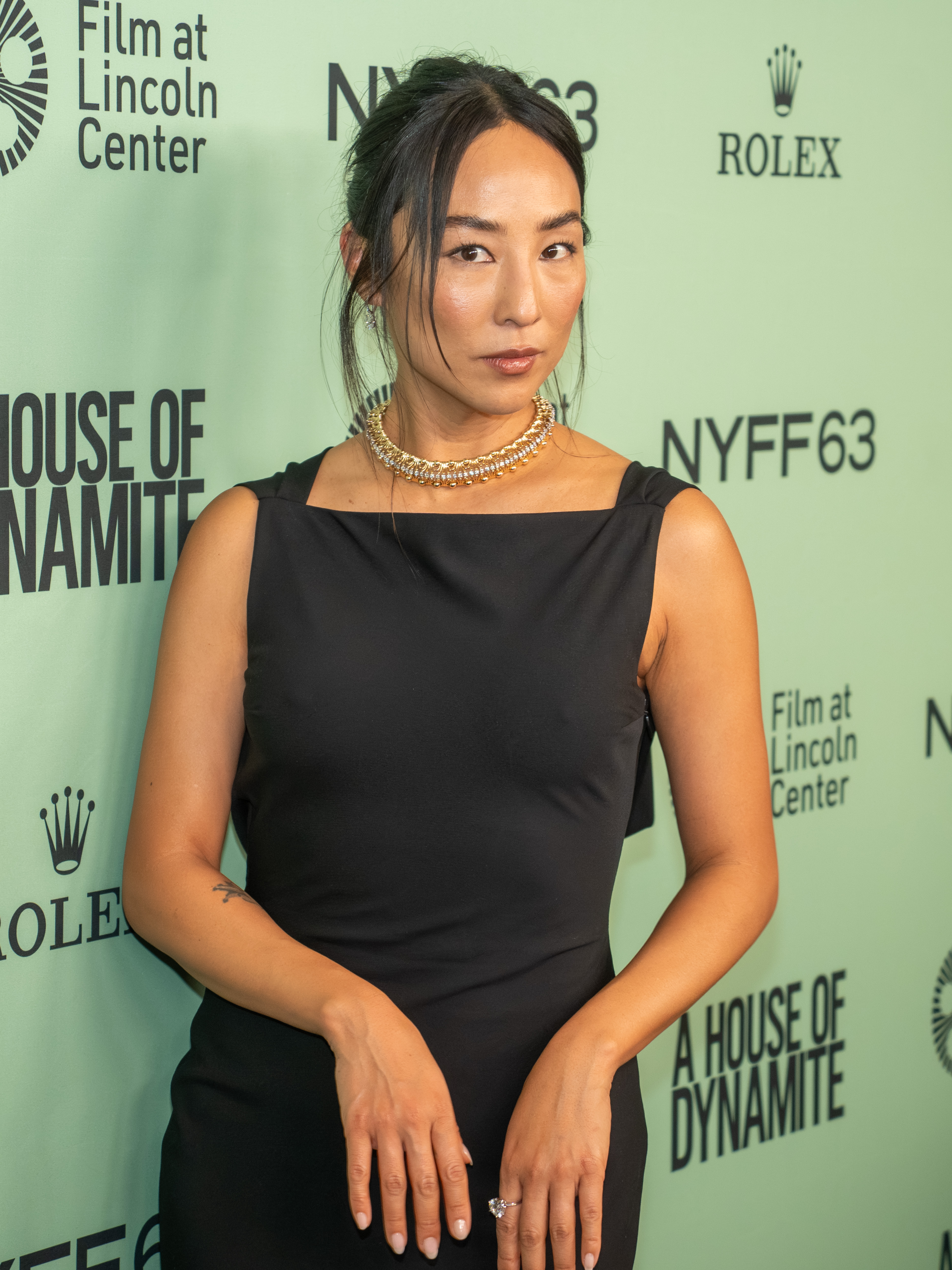
Greta Lee at the 2025 New York Film Festival

In June 2023, it was announced that Lee would join the cast of Tron: Ares alongside Jared Leto. In October 2024, it was announced she would join the cast of Kent Jones' Late Fame alongside Willem Dafoe.

Lee has been featured in advertising campaigns of fashion labels Loewe (2023 and 2024) and Calvin Klein (2024).

She voices the villain Lilypad in the Pixar animated film Toy Story 5 (2026).

In February 2027, Lee will be returning to Broadway, starring in Small Mouth Sounds.

== Personal life ==
Lee is married to actor and writer Russ Armstrong, with whom she has two sons.

== Filmography ==
Key
†	Denotes films that have not yet been released

=== Film ===
Year	Title	Role	Notes
2012	Hello I Must Be Going	Gap Girl	
2013	Hair Brained	Gertrude Lee	
2014	St. Vincent	Teller #23	
2014	While We're Young	Sundance Interviewer (voice)	
2014	Top Five	Pill Girl	
2014	The Cobbler	Kara	
2015	Sisters	Hae-Won Chan	
2016	10 Crosby	Cabbie	Short film; segment: "HiFi"
2016	Money Monster	Amy Lee	
2017	Fits and Starts	Jennifer	
2017	Gemini	Tracy	
2017	Cabiria, Charity, Chastity	Nina the Showgirl	Short film
2017	Pottersville	Ilene	
2018	In a Relationship	Maggie	
2018	Spider-Man: Into the Spider-Verse	Lyla (voice)	Credited as "Interesting Person #2"
2021	Rumble	Councilwoman (voice)	
2023	Past Lives	Nora Moon	
2023	Problemista	Dalia	
2023	Spider-Man: Across the Spider-Verse	Lyla (voice)	
2023	Strays	Bella (voice)	
2024	The Tiger's Apprentice	Rabbit (voice)	
2025	Late Fame	Gloria	
2025	A House of Dynamite	Officer Ana Park	
2025	Tron: Ares	Eve Kim	
2026	Toy Story 5	Lilypad (voice)	
2026	The Last House	Ann	
2027	Spider-Man: Beyond the Spider-Verse †	Lyla (voice)	Post-production
TBA	Honeymoon / Funeral †	TBA	Filming
TBA	Jonah	Ana	Filming

=== Television ===
Year	Title	Role	Notes
2006	Law & Order: Special Victims Unit	Heather Kim	Episode: "Taboo"
2009	The Electric Company	Greta / Allie	2 episodes
2012–2013	Nurse Jackie	Nurse	3 episodes
2012–2018	High Maintenance	Heidi	4 episodes
2013	Royal Pains	Daisy	Episode: "Pins and Needles"
2013	Bad Management	Mel	Television film
2013–2014	Girls	Soojin	4 episodes
2013–2016	Inside Amy Schumer	Herself	Recurring cast
2014	Seriously Distracted	Paige	Main cast
2014	Old Soul	Alix	TV Pilot
2014–2015	New Girl	Kai	5 episodes
2014–2015	Above Average Presents	Various	2 episodes
2015	Hudson Valley Ballers	Bartender	1 episode
2015	Good at Life	Dr. Simon	Television pilot
2015	Sharing	Heidi Salazar	Television pilot
2015–2016	Wayward Pines	Ruby	Recurring cast
2016–2017	Chance	Lucy	Recurring cast
2017	Broad City	Dr. Elizabeth Fuller	Episode: "Witches"
2017–2018	The Good Fight	Amber Wood-Lutz	2 episodes
2019	The Other Two	Genevieve Kim	Episode: "Chase Shoots a Music Video"
2019	At Home with Amy Sedaris	Herself	Episode: "Anniversary"
2019	Divorce	Insurance Adjuster	Episode: "Charred"
2019–2022	Russian Doll	Maxine	Main cast
2020	Miracle Workers: Dark Ages	Princess Vicky of Valdroggia	2 episodes
2020	What We Do in the Shadows	Celeste	Episode: "Collaboration"
2020	The Twilight Zone	Ellen Jones	Episode: "You Might Also Like"
2020	Helpsters	Beekeeper Bita	Episode: "Mr. Primm's Spoon Club/Cookie Cornelius"
2020	Don't Let the Pigeon Do Storytime!	Herself	Main cast
2021–2023	HouseBroken	Bubbles / various voices	14 episodes
2021–2025	The Morning Show	Stella Bak	Main role (seasons 2–4)
2024	The Second Best Hospital in the Galaxy	Various voices	4 episodes
2024	Solar Opposites	Alex (voice)	Episode: "The Educational Sprinkler Device"
2025	The Studio	Herself	Episode: "The Oner"

=== Music videos ===
Year	Title	Artist	Role
2026	"Opalite"	Taylor Swift	Indie Rock Goddess

== Theatre ==
Year	Title	Role	Notes
2007	The 25th Annual Putnam County Spelling Bee	Marcy Park	Circle in the Square, Broadway
2008	My Scary Girl	Lee Mi-na	Barrington Stage Company, Regional
2010	La Bête	Dorine	Music Box Theatre, Broadway; Harold Pinter Theatre, West End
2011	4000 Miles	Ashley	Lincoln Center Theatre, Off-Broadway.
2027	Small Mouth Sounds	Alicia	Ethel Barrymore Theatre

== Awards and nominations ==
Year	Award	Category	Nominated work	Result	Ref.
2022	Screen Actors Guild Awards	Outstanding Ensemble in a Drama Series	The Morning Show	Nominated	
2023	Critics Choice Awards Celebration of Cinema & Television	Actress Award for Film	Past Lives	Won	
2023	Dallas–Fort Worth Film Critics Association	Best Actress	Past Lives	Nominated	
2023	Gotham Awards	Outstanding Lead Performance	Past Lives	Nominated	
2023	Hollywood Critics Association Midseason Awards	Best Actress	Past Lives	Won	
2023	Indiana Film Journalists Association	Best Lead Performance	Past Lives	Nominated	
2023	Las Vegas Film Critics Society Awards	Best Actress	Past Lives	Nominated	
2023	Michigan Movie Critics Guild	Best Actress	Past Lives	Nominated	
2023	Michigan Movie Critics Guild	Breakthrough Award	Past Lives	Nominated	
2023	North Texas Film Critics Association	Best Actress	Past Lives	Nominated	
2023	Online Association of Female Film Critics	Best Female Lead	Past Lives	Nominated	
2023	Phoenix Critics Circle	Best Actress	Past Lives	Nominated	
2023	St. Louis Film Critics Association	Best Actress	Past Lives	Nominated	
2023	UK Film Critics Association Awards	Actress of the Year	Past Lives	Nominated	
2023	Washington D.C. Area Film Critics Association	Best Actress	Past Lives	Nominated	
2023	Women Film Critics Circle Awards	Best Screen Couple	Past Lives	Nominated	
2024	Alliance of Women Film Journalists	Best Actress	Past Lives	Nominated	
2024	Alliance of Women Film Journalists	Best Woman Breakthrough Performance	Past Lives	Nominated	
2024	Astra Film and Creative Arts Awards	Best Actress	Past Lives	Nominated	
2024	Austin Film Critics Association	Best Actress	Past Lives	Nominated	
2024	Chicago Indie Critics Awards	Best Actress	Past Lives	Nominated	
2024	Columbus Film Critics Association	Best Lead Performance	Past Lives	Nominated	
2024	Critics' Choice Awards	Best Actress	Past Lives	Nominated	
2024	Denver Film Critics Society	Best Lead Performance by an Actor, Female	Past Lives	Nominated	
2024	DiscussingFilm Critic Awards	Best Actress	Past Lives	Nominated	
2024	Dorian Awards	Lead Film Performance of the Year	Past Lives	Nominated	
2024	Georgia Film Critics Association	Best Actress	Past Lives	Nominated	
2024	Golden Globe Awards	Best Actress in a Motion Picture - Drama	Past Lives	Nominated	
2024	Greater Western New York Film Critics Association	Best Actress	Past Lives	Nominated	
2024	Hawaii Film Critics Society	Best Actress	Past Lives	Won	
2024	Houston Film Critics Society	Best Actress	Past Lives	Nominated	
2024	Independent Spirit Awards	Best Lead Performance	Past Lives	Nominated	
2024	Latino Entertainment Journalists Association	Best Actress	Past Lives	Nominated	
2024	London Film Critics' Circle	Actress of the Year	Past Lives	Nominated	
2024	London Film Critics' Circle	Breakthrough Performer of the Year	Past Lives	Nominated	
2024	Minnesota Film Critics Alliance	Best Actress	Past Lives	Nominated	
2024	Music City Film Critics Association	Best Actress	Past Lives	Nominated	
2024	North Carolina Film Critics Association	Best Actress	Past Lives	Nominated	
2024	North Carolina Film Critics Association	Best Breakthrough Performance	Past Lives	Nominated	
2024	North Dakota Film Society	Best Actress	Past Lives	Nominated	
2024	Online Film Critics Society	Best Actress	Past Lives	Nominated	
2024	Pandora International Film Critics	Best Actress	Past Lives	Nominated	
2024	Santa Barbara International Film Festival	Virtuoso Award	Past Lives	Won	
2024	San Francisco Bay Area Film Critics Circle	Best Actress	Past Lives	Nominated	
2024	Satellite Awards	Best Actress – Motion Picture Drama	Past Lives	Nominated	
2024	Seattle Film Critics Society	Best Actress	Past Lives	Nominated	
2024	Utah Film Critics Association	Best Lead Performance, Female	Past Lives	Runner-up	
2024	Primetime Emmy Awards	Outstanding Supporting Actress in a Drama Series	The Morning Show	Nominated	
2024	Screen Actors Guild Awards	Outstanding Ensemble in a Drama Series	The Morning Show	Nominated	
