= Mapleworth Murders =

- Genre: Comedy; Mystery
- Created by: Paula Pell; John Lutz
- Directed by: Claire Scanlon
- Starring: Paula Pell; John Lutz; J. B. Smoove; Hayley Magnus
- Original language: English
- No. of seasons: 1
- No. of episodes: 12

Production
- Executive producers: Lorne Michaels; Seth Meyers; Paula Pell; John Lutz; Andrew Singer; Michael Shoemaker
- Production companies: Universal Television; Broadway Video; Sethmaker Shoemeyers

Original release
- Release: August 10 – August 31, 2020

Mapleworth Murders is an American comedy-mystery television series created and written by Paula Pell and John Lutz, who also star alongside J. B. Smoove and Hayley Magnus. It was directed by Claire Scanlon. Lorne Michaels and Seth Meyers serve as executive producers. It premiered on August 10, 2020, on Quibi. In 2023, the 12 episodes began streaming on The Roku Channel.

== Premise ==
A murder-mystery writer investigates homicides in her small town, with each episode featuring guest victims and suspects, to answer the question: why are there so many murders in one small town?

== Cast and characters ==
=== Main ===
- Paula Pell as Abigail Mapleworth
- Hayley Magnus as Heidi
- John Lutz as Gilbert Pewntz
- J. B. Smoove as Chief Billy Bills

=== Guest ===
- James Anderson as Branda Bcbillan
- Fred Armisen as Brody Bcbillan/Belk
- Ike Barinholtz as Richard Belt
- Nicole Byer as Julia Squift
- D'Arcy Carden as Server
- Jimmy Carlson
- Terry Crews as Yoda
- Tina Fey as Martha
- Mary Holland
- Drew Tarver as Brent Davenport
- Jack McBrayer as Dink Choadler
- Tim Meadows as Andy Hapsburg
- Annie Mumolo as Paige Wellingtont
- Pam Murphy as Camille Canelli-Twat
- Patton Oswalt as Jerry Sprinks
- Chris Parnell as Ben Canelli
- Maya Rudolph as Broda Bcbillan
- Andy Samberg as Bran Bcbillan
- Wanda Sykes as Leigh Drain
- Ben Warheit as Ben Jr.

== Episodes ==
| No. | Title | Directed by | Written by | Original release date |
|---|---|---|---|---|
| 1 | "A Murderer's Beef – Part 1" | Claire Scanlon | Paula Pell & John Lutz | August 10, 2020 |
| 2 | "A Murderer's Beef – Part 2" | Claire Scanlon | Paula Pell & John Lutz | August 10, 2020 |
| 3 | "A Murderer's Beef – Part 3" | Claire Scanlon | Paula Pell & John Lutz | August 10, 2020 |
| 4 | "The Case of the Case of Wine – Part 1" | Claire Scanlon | Paula Pell & John Lutz | August 17, 2020 |
| 5 | "The Case of the Case of Wine – Part 2" | Claire Scanlon | Paula Pell & John Lutz | August 17, 2020 |
| 6 | "The Case of the Case of Wine – Part 3" | Claire Scanlon | Paula Pell & John Lutz | August 17, 2020 |
| 7 | "Killer Voices – Part 1" | Claire Scanlon | Paula Pell & John Lutz | August 24, 2020 |
| 8 | "Killer Voices – Part 2" | Claire Scanlon | Paula Pell & John Lutz | August 24, 2020 |
| 9 | "Killer Voices – Part 3" | Claire Scanlon | Paula Pell & John Lutz | August 24, 2020 |
| 10 | "Mrs. Mapleworth's Grand Finale – Part 1" | Claire Scanlon | Paula Pell & John Lutz | August 31, 2020 |
| 11 | "Mrs. Mapleworth's Grand Finale – Part 2" | Claire Scanlon | Paula Pell & John Lutz | August 31, 2020 |
| 12 | "Mrs. Mapleworth's Grand Finale – Part 3" | Claire Scanlon | Paula Pell & John Lutz | August 31, 2020 |

== Production ==
=== Development ===
Lutz and Pell created the series as a parody of Murder, She Wrote following a suggestion from Lutz's wife, fellow comedian Sue Galloway. In June 2019, it was announced Pell and Lutz would star, write and executive produce the series, with Lorne Michaels and Seth Meyers serving as producers under their Broadway Video and Sethmaker Shoemeyers banner, alongside Universal Television for Quibi. In December 2019, it was announced Claire Scanlon would direct the series.

Due to the format of Quibi, each episode was 10 minutes, but they were developed as three-part story arcs to allow the series to later be reformatted to a traditional 30-minute, three-act comedy series.

=== Casting ===
In December 2019, J. B. Smoove and Hayley Magnus joined the cast as series regulars, with Fred Armisen, Tim Meadows, Maya Rudolph, Patton Oswalt, Jack McBrayer, D'Arcy Carden, Pam Murphy, Ben Warheit, Annie Mumolo, Ike Barinholtz, Mary Holland, James Anderson, and Drew Tarver in recurring capacity and Tina Fey, Chris Parnell, Andy Samberg, Wanda Sykes, Terry Crews, Nicole Byer and Jimmy Carlson to guest star.

== Awards ==
| Year | Award | Category | Nominee(s) | Result | Ref. |
|---|---|---|---|---|---|
| 2021 | Primetime Emmy Awards | Outstanding Actor in a Short Form Comedy or Drama Series | John Lutz | Nominated | |
| 2021 | Primetime Emmy Awards | Outstanding Actor in a Short Form Comedy or Drama Series | J. B. Smoove | Won | |
| 2021 | Primetime Emmy Awards | Outstanding Actress in a Short Form Comedy or Drama Series | Paula Pell | Nominated | |
