= Loot (TV series) =

American comedy television series

- Genre: Comedy
- Created by: Alan Yang & Matt Hubbard
- Starring: Maya Rudolph; Michaela Jaé Rodriguez; Joel Kim Booster; Ron Funches; Nat Faxon; Meagen Fay; Stephanie Styles
- Music by: The Math Club; Transcenders
- Opening theme: "Gimme That Money" by the Math Club featuring Craig Smith and Relaye
- Country of origin: United States
- Original language: English
- No. of seasons: 3
- No. of episodes: 30

Production
- Executive producers: Alan Yang; Matt Hubbard; Maya Rudolph; Natasha Lyonne; Danielle Renfrew Behrens; Dave Becky; Dean Holland
- Producers: Kris Eber; Missy Mansour
- Cinematography: Mark Schwartzbard; Blake McClure; Jason Oldak
- Editors: Daniel Haworth; Heather Capps; Jesse Millward; Sue Federman; Pamela March; Keenan Hiett; Jessica McGovern; Catherine Cloutier
- Running time: 23–30 minutes
- Production companies: Normal Sauce; Alan Yang Pictures; Animal Pictures; 3 Arts Entertainment; Universal Television; Banana Split

Original release
- Network: Apple TV+
- Release: June 24, 2022 – May 29, 2024
- Network: Apple TV
- Release: October 15, 2025 – present

Loot (Note: Known as Worth in Turkey) is an American comedy television series created by Matt Hubbard and Alan Yang that premiered on June 24, 2022, on Apple TV. It follows newly single Molly Wells, whose divorce from her tech billionaire ex-husband has made her the third-wealthiest woman in the US, as she decides to run the day-to-day work of the charitable foundation she forgot she founded, much to its employees' chagrin.

The show stars Maya Rudolph, Michaela Jaé Rodriguez, Joel Kim Booster, Ron Funches, and Nat Faxon. It has received generally positive reviews. In July 2022, it was renewed for a second season, which premiered on April 3, 2024. In July 2024, it was renewed for a third season which premiered on October 15, 2025.

== Synopsis ==
Middle-aged Molly Wells divorces her tech billionaire husband of 20 years after he has an affair, and goes on a worldwide bender with her newfound $87 billion fortune, ending in an existential mid-life crisis. She decides to reengage with the charitable foundation she and her husband forgot they founded years earlier and to reconnect with the world outside the billionaire class, finding herself along the way.

== Cast and characters ==
=== Main ===
- Maya Rudolph as Molly Wells, a divorced billionaire
- Michaela Jaé Rodriguez as Sofia Salinas, the stern executive director of Molly's foundation
- Joel Kim Booster as Nicholas, Molly's loyal and well-connected assistant, as well as an aspiring actor
- Ron Funches as Howard, Molly's enthusiastic distant cousin and the foundation's IT specialist
- Nat Faxon as Arthur, a well-meaning divorced father originally from Rhode Island and the foundation's accountant, who becomes romantically interested in Molly
- Meagen Fay as Rhonda (season 2; recurring season 1 and 3), an eccentric senior employee of the foundation who enjoys doing various activities nude.
- Stephanie Styles as Ainsley Whitebottom (season 2–present; recurring season 1), a perky but not very intelligent employee of the foundation

=== Recurring ===
- Adam Scott as John Novak, Molly's ex-husband, with whom she built the company that made them both rich
- David Chang as himself (seasons 1–2)
- Amber Chardae Robinson as Tanya (season 1)
- Olivier Martinez as Jean-Pierre (season 1), the son of a wealthy Frenchman and one of Molly's boyfriends
- O-T Fagbenle as Isaac (season 2), Molly's architect friend and Sofia's love interest
- Hayley Magnus as Willa (season 2), an Australian model and Arthur's love interest
- X Mayo as Destiny Salinas (season 3), Sofia's sister and Howard's love interest

=== Guest ===
- Seal as himself (season 1)
- Dylan Gelula as Hailey (season 1), John's young assistant and mistress
- Caitlin Reilly as Jacinda (season 1)
- Sean Evans as himself (season 1)
- Brendan Scannell as Paul (season 1)
- George Wyner as Martin Streibler (season 1)
- Kym Whitley as Renee (season 1)
- GaTa as himself (season 1)
- Tony Hawk as himself (season 2)
- John Lutz as Nicholas' adoptive father (season 2)
- Pam Murphy as Nicholas' adoptive mother (season 2)
- Benjamin Bratt as himself (season 2)
- Jim Rash as Emil (season 2), a Swedish billionaire seeking to buy Molly's yacht. Rash previously co-wrote and co-directed the films The Way, Way Back and Downhill with Faxon.
- Ana Gasteyer as Grace (season 2), another billionaire who offers to join Molly's charitable pursuits
- Allan Havey as Norman Lofton (season 2), one of the wealthiest men alive, who secretly runs a mock cult dedicated to preserving the existence of billionaires
- Henry Winkler as Gerald Canning (season 3), the leader of a nudist colony for senior citizens on a tropical island
- Juliet Mills as Lady Olivia (season 3)
- D'Arcy Carden as 'Luciana'/Ashlee Kate (season 3), an unsophisticated social climber from Delaware who poses as an Italian socialite to marry John for his money
- Kesha as herself (season 3)
- Paula Pell as Paula (season 3), the leader of Arthur's birdwatcher group
- Zane Phillips as Maro Gold (season 3), a handsome but not very bright young man who becomes interested in Molly during her social media campaign
- Melinda French Gates as herself (season 3)
- Mario Lopez as himself (season 3), the host of Access Hollywood
- Christine Ko as Petra, Sofia's former romantic interest, who offers her a chance to run for Congress. Ko is married to series co-creator Alan Yang.

== Episodes ==
=== Series overview ===
Season	Episodes	Originally released		
Season	Episodes	First released	Last released	Network
1	10	June 24, 2022	August 12, 2022	Apple TV+
2	10	April 3, 2024	May 29, 2024	Apple TV+
3	10	October 15, 2025	December 10, 2025	Apple TV

=== Season 1 (2022) ===
No. overall	No. in season	Title	Directed by	Written by	Original release date
1	1	"Pilot"	Alan Yang	Alan Yang & Matt Hubbard	June 24, 2022
Self-made tech billionaires John and Molly Novak live in extravagant luxury together until her 45th birthday party, when she discovers he is having an affair with his much younger assistant, Hailey. Molly demands a divorce, and her $87 billion settlement makes her the second-wealthiest woman in the world. After a debauched trip around the world with her loyal assistant Nicholas, spending enough money to be demoted to the third-wealthiest woman in the world, she is called in to meet with Sofia Salinas, the executive director of the charitable foundation she forgot she founded with her husband during a previous bender. Sofia warns that her recent public antics have reflected poorly on the organization. Molly also meets the foundation's IT specialist Howard–who is also her distant cousin–and divorced accountant Arthur. The well-meaning but grossly out-of-touch Molly crashes the opening of a women's shelter, further embarrassing the organization in the process. She admits to the unsympathetic Sofia that she has struggled with lack of purpose over the course of a midlife crisis, and takes a new interest in the foundation, reclaiming her long-disused office and her maiden name: Molly Wells.
2	2	"Bienvenidos a Miami"	Alan Yang	Alan Yang & Matt Hubbard	June 24, 2022
Leaving her household staff to enjoy her Los Angeles mansion for themselves, Molly and Nicholas arrive at the foundation for her first day of "work", to Sofia's chagrin. Soon bored, Molly flies her co-workers on a "bonding retreat" to Miami aboard her private jet, but a storm forces them to land in Oklahoma City. When Nicholas explains that the trip's true purpose was to allow Molly to party with friends, her co-workers angrily return home. In Miami, Molly comes to terms with her wealthy friends' selfish behavior. Returning to work the next day, she supports Sofia in a meeting with a city councilwoman and apologizes to the team. They all bond over after-work drinks, where Sofia reveals that her family's hardships inspired her to pursue charitable work at 8 years old, and Molly reaffirms her commitment to the foundation.
3	3	"Hot Seat"	Angela Barnes	Alan Yang & Matt Hubbard	June 24, 2022
Unable to keep from watching a TV interview with John and Hailey, Molly is outraged by his condescension toward her foundation and herself. The Wells Foundation throws its support behind Molly, helping prepare her for a slew of interviews she booked for the following day. Arthur convinces her to try reading glasses, while Howard drags an unwilling Nicholas into assisting with his relationship problems. That night, Sofia visits Molly at home for more prep. Nicholas scolds Howard for seeking his advice outside work, but soon apologizes; Howard later assures him that theirs is the strongest kind of friendship: a weird one. Molly bails on her interviews and appears on Hot Ones instead, leading to a spicy, beer-fueled on-camera meltdown. She admits to feeling intimidated by John, but Sofia helps her realize how much she contributed to his success, and she sits down for another interview.
4	4	"Excitement Park"	Angela Barnes	Bridget Kyle & Vicky Luu	July 1, 2022
When a roller coaster full of riders is stuck upside down in the Philippines, the media discovers that Molly owns the theme park, one of the numerous companies she received in her divorce. Arthur looks through the rest of Molly's holdings, and she brings him with her to inspect a potentially problematic art gallery. Howard discovers Nicholas is an aspiring actor, with an embarrassing Axe body spray commercial, and helps him prepare to audition for a play. At a city council meeting, Sofia realizes how much public support Molly may have on her side. Molly and Arthur bond at her alpaca farm, and she flies him by helicopter to take his daughter to her soccer game. Tabloid photos paint them as a couple, forcing Molly to remind them both that she is his boss, but Arthur arrives home to discover that she bought him a painting he liked at the gallery.
5	5	"Halsa"	Miguel Arteta	Yassir Lester	July 8, 2022
Struggling with his feelings for Molly, Arthur throws the painting away, but narrowly saves it from the garbage and hides it in a closet instead. Things are now awkward between him and Molly, who takes Sofia and their co-workers Rhonda and Ainsley to an exclusive spa for a day of self-care. Meanwhile, Arthur joins Nicholas and Howard for lunch, where they agree to provide him with dating advice. Molly runs into her wealthy friends, and discovers that Hailey took her place on their annual "wives' trip". She lashes out, losing her spa membership, but her co-workers help her realize how she has moved on from her old life for the better. As Howard and Nicholas set up a dating profile for him, Arthur hits it off with a woman at the bar instead, which Molly learns back at the office. That night, she nearly texts Arthur but thinks better of it.
6	6	"The Philanthropic Humanitarian Awards"	Miguel Arteta	Zeke Nicholson	July 15, 2022
After surprising outreach programs and non-profits across Southern California with generous donations, the Wells Foundation team is invited to the Philanthropic Humanitarian Awards, where Molly will be honored. At the event, she is charmed by fellow philanthropist Jean-Pierre Voland but is rattled by the appearance of John and Hailey. Nicholas and Sofia encourage her not to let John "win the divorce", helping her regain her poise. Arthur meets his accounting hero, leaving Howard with a sense of inadequacy, but Arthur reassures him of the power of his likeability. John asks to speak with Molly privately and ostensibly apologizes, but their mutual resentments erupt and he reveals that he arranged for her to receive her award. She decides to leave but is touched when her team is ready to join her. Arriving onstage to accept her award, Molly presents it to her team instead. As they prepare to celebrate at Dave & Buster's, Jean-Pierre asks Molly to collaborate.
7	7	"French Connection"	Kevin Bray	Lauren Tyler	July 22, 2022
Jean-Pierre invites Molly to dinner, and the team searches his social media profiles to determine his intentions. Arriving at his vineyard, Molly finds herself hoping for romance, but is confused by the arrival of his "partner", Jacqueline. A call to Sofia confirms that Jacqueline is his married associate, but Molly is disappointed to learn that their dinner is to discuss business. As she drives away, Jean-Pierre catches up to her on horseback; they confess their mutual interest, and he kisses her. As thanks for Howard's help with his successful audition, Nicholas reluctantly agrees to join him and his girlfriend Tanya for dinner. He and Tanya hit it off, but while Howard is in the bathroom, she reveals that she does not consider him "marriage material", despite their 8-year relationship. Nicholas tells Howard the truth, which Tanya denies, and Howard takes her side, ending their friendship.
8	8	"Spades Night"	Kevin Bray	April Quioh	July 29, 2022
Molly decides to reconnect with her and Howard's family, and he brings her to their unforgiving cousin Renee's spades night. She manages to win Renee over but offends her by replacing her broken card table, and she chastises Molly for trying to "buy off" the family to make amends for her absence. Molly reveals that she missed Renee's wedding because John forced her on a trip after she discovered his messages with another woman, and she and Renee reconcile. Nicholas and Arthur are captivated when the deeply private Sofia receives flowers from someone named Jalen, followed by the arrival of a man named Tony, who has an inaudible fight with Sofia in her office. Nicholas lip-reads their argument for Arthur to translate from Spanish, and they confront Sofia, who is torn between the free-spirited Jalen and the dependable Tony. Though Molly is enjoying her jet-setting romance with Jean-Pierre, Sofia urges Arthur not to give up on his chances with her.
9	9	"Cahoga Lake"	Alan Yang	Anna Salinas	August 5, 2022
Molly and Jean-Pierre announce that they will be taking the team to the upcoming "Silver Moon Summit", overshadowing Sofia's news that the foundation's new affordable housing development will be approved. Molly, Sofia, and Arthur attend the zoning vote, which passes, but Molly is attacked by vicious public comments and pies. Arthur defends her, but she is soon whisked away by Jean-Pierre. It is the opening night for Nicholas' play, Cahoga Lake, and he is asked to take over as the lead. Despite their feud, Howard spends the day trying to help him find a way to cry on cue, ignoring Tanya's demanding calls. At the theater, Howard realizes the truth about her selfishness and ends their relationship. He informs Nicholas just before he goes onstage and tells him that he loves him and is proud of him, finally enabling Nicholas to cry. The team congratulates him after his performance, but Molly is not there.
10	10	"The Silver Moon Summit"	Alan Yang	Alan Yang & Matt Hubbard	August 12, 2022
Being driven to the airport, Sofia refuses to stay in the car after her driver disparages the city's unhoused population. She and the team arrive in Corsica for the summit, where Molly prepares to present Jean-Pierre's new potable water purification system. Sofia accuses her of ignoring their local mission and being swept up in yet another man's life. Nicholas and Howard comfort Arthur, who admits that he is in love with Molly. During a disastrous demonstration of Jean-Pierre's failed machine, Molly forces herself to drink a glass of still-tainted water. Jean-Pierre suggests running away from their problems, and Molly sends her team a note declaring that she is stepping away from the foundation. Aboard her plane, she is confronted by Sofia and reveals that she broke up with Jean-Pierre. Sofia reminds her of the positive changes she brought to her foundation and her team, and refuses to accept her resignation. Returning to the conference, Molly announces her plan to give away her entire fortune to charity. The team celebrates, and Arthur tells Molly he has something to talk to her about. In the morning, Molly wakes up in bed with John.

=== Season 2 (2024) ===
No. overall	No. in season	Title	Directed by	Written by	Original release date
11	1	"Space for Everyone"	Alan Yang	Alan Yang & Matt Hubbard	April 3, 2024
Regretting sleeping with John in Corsica, Molly asks for some space from him. In response, John announces he plans to go to space with Novak Aeronautics. Howard moves into Molly's guesthouse after he broke up with Tanya. When Sofia finds out the city is pulling support for the Alameda Street Project, Wells Foundation turns to Noah Hope-DeVore, the founder of an AI startup, for support. While pitching an idea to the foundation, Noah is arrested for money laundering. With the city not allowing new affordable housing to be built, Molly decides to buy vacant hotels in downtown Los Angeles to provide free housing and a resource center.
12	2	"Clueless"	Kevin Bray	Bridget Kyle & Vicky Luu	April 3, 2024
Wells Foundation closes on their first hotel to turn into housing and bring in a British designer, Isaac, to renovate it. The designer and Sofia disagree on the focus of the redesign, sparking interest in each other. Molly and Nicholas set them up at a pop-up rooftop bar. When Isaac does not contact Sofia after their date, she goes to confront him. She ends up crashing a memorial anniversary party. Arthur agrees to look at Howard's finances so he can move out of Molly's house. Arthur convinces Howard to sell his wrestling memorabilia. While selling at a wrestling match, Arthur convinces Howard to start his own wrestling league to hire his favorite wrestling heroes.
13	3	"Vengeance Falls"	Alan Yang	Emily Spivey	April 10, 2024
As Nicholas starts a new play, Molly invites his parents from Indiana to see the show. His parents don't care about his life in California or his acting career, and want him to move back to the farm. When Nicholas and Molly fight about her inviting his parents, Nicholas tells Molly that she cannot survive without her staff. Molly tries to prove him wrong by giving her staff the day off and gets trapped in her panic room. Howard discovers that Sofia is a Swiftie and tries to out her.
14	4	"Mr. Congeniality"	Kevin Bray	Zeke Nicholson	April 17, 2024
Molly has been feeling sexually stifled and decides to relax at a 72 hour retreat. At the retreat, Molly is partnered up with Benjamin Bratt. Arthur and Howard interview wrestlers that will play the villain in Howard's new wrestling league. Nicholas and Sofia get invested in Ainsley's family and wedding drama, helping her with arranging the wedding reception seating chart.
15	5	"Mally's"	Claire Scanlon	Matt Murray	April 24, 2024
Molly has her first birthday since she divorced John. To get her mind off her birthday, Arthur helps Molly sell the mega-yacht John bought her to a Swedish billionaire, Emil. Emil wants to go on a 4th walk through of the mega-yacht before buying, so Arthur and Molly decide to spend a couple of hours at the mall in Long Beach. Sofia plans for the team to go into the community surrounding the Space for Everyone hotel to get community buy-in. Howard and Nicholas run into several of Nicholas' exes.
16	6	"Women Who Rule"	Claire Scanlon	April Korto Quioh	May 1, 2024
Nicholas subjects Molly, who wants to feel young again, to an intense rejuvenation regimen so she can participate in a fashion show with the theme "Women Who Rule". Arriving at the event, Molly befriends the younger models and starts participating in their activities, including getting high and drunk, leading her to have a meltdown and collapse on the runway. Afraid of commitment, Sofia attempts to break up with Isaac despite the two of them being a perfect match. Arthur seeks fashion advice from Howard and dresses up in an exquisite, custom-tailored suit and tie for the fashion event, only to be mistaken for one of the security guards wearing identical uniforms.
17	7	"Camp Wells"	Anna Dokoza	Anna Salinas	May 8, 2024
After Molly finds Arthur wearing only his boxer shorts in one of her bathrooms, Nicholas confides to her that Arthur is interested in her and suggests taking him somewhere romantic to start a potentially intimate relationship. Molly announces to the team the next day that she is taking them to her palace in Dubai but changes her mind when she discovers that Arthur has a new girlfriend from Australia named Willa. To the group's disappointment, they go to a mountaintop cabin with intermittent to no cell phone reception. Molly's attempts to charm Arthur fail as he is continuously reminded of Willa. Enraged, Molly attempts to drive the group's van into town to buy supplies for s'mores but runs into a nude Rhonda, who survives. Sofia and Howard bond over their shared unpleasant memories of going to sleep-away camps. Ainsley buys a flight to Dubai on her own but remains stuck at Dubai International Airport and unable to contact her friends.
18	8	"Grace"	Anna Dokoza	Maggie Sheridan	May 15, 2024
Wanting to expand Space for Everyone hotels across the country, the Wells Foundation needs more money than Molly has. Sofia and Molly show up at the house of Grace Fences, who is recently divorced and received $110 billion in the settlement. Grace is still in her post-divorce partying phase that Molly went through right after her divorce. Though Grace offers $11 billion for the project, Molly declines the money to help her deal with her emotions. Grace takes everyone at her party on her private jet to Reykjavík but Molly is able to help Grace see the hope in her new-found freedom. Grace ends up donating all of her money to the Space for Everyone project expansion, which encourages three other billionaires to join the effort as well. As Sofia is leaving Grace's party, she sees Arthur and Willa kissing and is weirded out. Howard helps Nicholas prepare for an audition for a Korean show by teaching Nicholas how to speak Korean.
19	9	"Mood Vibrations"	Alan Yang	Nick Lehmann	May 22, 2024
Sofia goes to Isaac's house and finds that he plays the saxophone in a Jazz band. He lets her know he is going to quit his job to be a musician, leading Sofia to break up with him. Grace joins Wells Foundation and helps other billionaires join due to their hate of John. As John announces his rocket is named for Molly and that they are getting back together, the billionaires get nervous in maintaining their support of the foundation. Arthur helps Molly escape from paparazzi and they go back to his house where they almost kiss. John's rocket explodes after take off, but John admits he blew it up on purpose to get Molly to realize she still loves him. Molly rejects him because she is in love with Arthur. Howard prepares for the premiere of his wrestling league, Legends of SoCal Wrestling. Nicholas helps him overcome many of the setbacks to have successful launch.
20	10	"We Shouldn't Exist"	Alan Yang	Alan Yang & Matt Hubbard	May 29, 2024
When Norman Lofton, one of the wealthiest men in the world, comes to Los Angeles, Molly and the team go out of their way to give him a warm reception. However, Norman wants Molly to give up her endeavors to give away her fortunes and join his mock cult, arguing that billionaires existing is part of the natural order of modern times. Molly refuses and is distraught to find out that Grace has betrayed her and joined Norman's group. Nicholas receives a call from a mysterious Korean woman whom Howard believes is Nicholas's biological mother; though Nicholas declines to return the call at first, he answers it while getting drunk with Howard and reveals embarrassing true details from his past. The woman on the phone turns out to be a casting agent for an upcoming Korean TV series with an offer to audition for a role that fits Nicholas's personality perfectly. While Sofia rekindles her romance with Isaac, Molly gets drunk and has a one-night stand with John. Realizing she needs to take action to secure her relationship with Arthur, she goes to his house, only to find out Willa is also there. Heartbroken, Molly storms to the airport the next morning with Nicholas in tow and orders her private jet's pilot to take her as far away from home as possible.

=== Season 3 (2025) ===
No. overall	No. in season	Title	Directed by	Written by	Original release date
21	1	"Bye-bye Mode"	Claire Scanlon	Emily Spivey & Maya Rudolph	October 15, 2025
Molly, after passing out from being given an unknown substance, wakes up surrounded by wreckage on the shore of what appears to be a deserted island with Nicholas, who informs her that her plane crashed. However, Nicholas has staged the crash, and they are actually on the island of "St. Novak's", with the staff of a nearby mansion working to keep up the ruse so Molly can enjoy a mental health reset. Sofia, Howard, and Rhonda arrive and force Nicholas to confess the truth to Molly, who at first refuses to leave the island due to seeing Arthur with Willa. She is then motivated to return home, but the only way off the island is via a ferry owned by Gerald Canning, the leader of "Vagine", a senior citizen nudist colony. While Rhonda embraces the nudist lifestyle, the others reluctantly participate in various activities without their shoes to persuade Gerald to let them use his ferry. As they are about to leave, Arthur, having traveled to every island Molly owns, arrives by rowboat and admits that he dumped Willa and loves Molly, with whom he shares a kiss. Molly allows Rhonda to stay with the nudists while the rest of the group sails home.
22	2	"Would Hit"	Claire Scanlon	Luke Del Tredici	October 15, 2025
23	3	"Lady Molly"	Rebecca Asher	Jeremy Beiler	October 22, 2025
24	4	"Buona Sera"	Carrie Brownstein	Sudi Green	October 29, 2025
With encouragement and support from Arthur, Molly goes one of John's mansions so he can pick her brain regarding a new foundation idea, only to find he has a new socialite girlfriend from Italy named Luciana, who fawns over him. Unknown to John, "Luciana" is really Ashlee Kate, a crass social climber from Delaware determined to stop Molly's campaign against billionaires so she can marry John for his money. Meanwhile, Howard tries to make a good impression on Destiny, now working at the foundation as a receptionist, despite Sofia's ongoing skepticism.
25	5	"Joyride"	Rebecca Asher	Gabe Liedman	November 5, 2025
Molly, fearing that her relationship with Nicholas has become overly codependent, takes him out for a day of fun activities as a way of thanking him for all his help, while recalling how she met him. In flashbacks to 2011, Nicholas lives in a retirement community and first meets Molly when he helps her identify a straight fashion designer posing as gay, then offers to improve her wardrobe and hairstyle. After a wild night of partying without John, who tells her that she won't fit in at the party he is attending, they wake up in the retirement community, albeit not having been intimate with one another, and make an agreement to always take care of each other. In the present, Molly shows Nicholas the old agreement and encourages him to follow his dreams of acting.
26	6	"What's Up with Us"	Dean Holland	Zeke Nicholson	November 12, 2025
Arthur takes Molly out for a day of birdwatching at a mountaintop resort with his "birding" group. Molly quickly earns the ire of Paula, the group's director, by being too noisy and starting an altercation just before the group can to spot a rare breed of bird. To make amends, Molly has a luxurious RV she bought from Will Smith arrive, which Arthur, who had other romantic plans, finds is too much, and he criticizes Molly for buying her way out of her problems. The rare bird the group has been trying to spot finally arrives, only to be killed when a fan on Molly's RV activates, ruining Molly's chance to make things right with Arthur.
27	7	"Billionaire, Beautiful and True"	Dean Holland	Anna Salinas	November 19, 2025
Realizing Molly's life is falling apart without Nicholas, Sofia, Howard, and Ainsley trick her into passing out so they can fly her to Seoul in order to catch up with him. Molly encounters Nicholas, who explains how well he is doing; in turn, she claims that things are going fine with Arthur. That evening at a bar, Howard discovers a new TV series being advertised: "Billionaire, Beautiful and True". The group takes Molly to a local studio, where they find Nicholas serving as the executive producer, head writer, and star of the series, which is directly based on their lives. Nicholas explains that he misses life back in LA and agrees to return as Molly's new social media brand manager. Back at the foundation, Arthur invites Sofia to join his after-hours board game club for fellow divorcés. She shows impressive skill at playing Ticket to Ride while drunkenly revealing how she feels concerning Destiny. On her flight back home, Arthur messages Molly, saying he is open to talking again.
28	8	"Mr. Maro Gold"	Carrie Brownstein	Nick Lehmann & Maggie Sheridan	November 26, 2025
After Arthur declines to wear an outrageous outfit to a fashion gala with Molly, a handsome but slow-witted beachgoer named Maro Gold, who has been following Molly's social media campaign, arrives at her mansion, making Molly question her loyalty to Arthur as well as the ethics of dating a significantly younger man. Destiny wants to go on a nationwide campaign by van to promote the foundation alongside Howard, who has grown so used to living in Molly's house that he is immediately disgusted by the idea of living in the run-down van. Though Destiny claims she would always choose Howard when he voices his concerns, she dumps him after they have sex and he makes celebratory tacos. That evening, Sofia consoles Howard. Arthur decides to support Molly and go to the gala on the condition that he wear a normal suit and tie. Molly reveals that her outfit for him was intended to be part of a couple's costume ensemble, and she ends up going with Maro, who wears the outfit.
29	9	"Slide"	Anna Dokoza	Leigh Pruden & Hank Winton	December 3, 2025
Molly's anti-billionaire campaign becomes so successful that an incensed Ashlee Kate takes notice and swears revenge. Maro introduces Molly to three of his friends, all of whom have social eccentricities, and Molly starts to feel her age. Arthur searches his old photo albums to find out where in life he became the kind of person he believes Molly would dump and concludes that it started when he chose not ingest cocaine at a Goo Goo Dolls concert. Nicholas and Howard decide to give him a placebo instead, and Arthur runs to a baseball field in his undergarments. Learning the truth, Arthur returns to work, having been absent for several days but now liking who he is more, with newfound appreciation for his friends. FBI agents raid the foundation thanks to John contacting the President of the United States on the request of Kate, who has threatened to have the nonprofit shut down.
30	10	"Hail Mary Time"	Anna Dokoza	Matt Hubbard	December 10, 2025
To save the foundation, Molly and the team decide to crash John and Kate's wedding. Sofia seeks aide from former romantic interest Petra, who offers her a chance to run for Congress in place of the elderly Representative Watkins. On the flight to Italy, the team stops by Kate's old high school in Delaware, where Molly agrees to make a generous donation in exchange for a yearbook proving Kate's identity. Arriving in Italy, Molly discovers that John has left Kate at the altar, devastating her. Motivated by Molly, Kate reveals her true identity to the entire party and calls off the wedding and the FBI investigations, instead celebrating her authentic self with Molly's team and enjoying the luxuries John left behind while she can. Molly and Arthur move gently towards restoring their relationship as they dance when Maro suddenly interrupts and proposes to Molly. Arthur seemingly tries to deescalate the situation, but he then proposes as well, leaving Molly stunned.

== Production ==
It was announced in March 2021 that Apple TV+ had ordered to series an untitled comedy that would star Maya Rudolph, created by Matt Hubbard and Alan Yang. In May, Michaela Jaé Rodriguez was cast, with Joel Kim Booster joining in July. Olivier Martinez was cast for a recurring role in November. Nat Faxon and Ron Funches were revealed as part of the main cast upon the series' first look. On July 11, 2022, Apple TV+ renewed the series for a second season. On May 5, 2023, it was reported that production for the second season had been shut down due to the 2023 Writers Guild of America strike; it was unclear when it would resume. On July 16, 2024, Apple TV+ renewed the series for a third season.

Filming on the first season began on September 6, 2021. It was filmed at The One in Bel Air, Los Angeles.

The production of the third season was put on hold due to Maya Rudolph's return to Saturday Night Live.

== Release ==
The series debuted on Apple TV+ on June 24, 2022. The second season premiered on April 3, 2024. The third season premiered on October 15, 2025, with two new episodes and the rest debuting on a weekly basis until December 10, 2025.

== Reception ==
=== Critical response ===
For the first season, the review aggregator website Rotten Tomatoes reported an 83% approval rating, based on 54 critic reviews. The website's critics' consensus reads, "Loot doesn't quite service comedic treasure Maya Rudolph as satisfyingly as a star vehicle should, although there are enough riches here to suggest a big return on investment—when this promising sitcom finds its footing." Metacritic, which uses a weighted average, assigned a score of 65 out of 100 based on 22 critics, indicating "generally favorable reviews".

Viewers have observed similarities between the plot of the show and the separation and divorce of Jeff Bezos and MacKenzie Scott.

The second season has an 83% approval rating on Rotten Tomatoes, based on 6 critic reviews.

The third season holds an approval rating of 100% on Rotten Tomatoes, based on 5 critic reviews.

=== Accolades ===
Award	Date of ceremony	Category	Nominee(s)	Result	Ref.
Artios Awards	February 12, 2025	Outstanding Achievement in Casting – Television Series – Comedy	Jill Anthony Thomas, Anthony J. Kraus and Katrina Wandel George	Nominated	
Astra TV Awards	December 8, 2024	Best Streaming Comedy Series	Loot	Nominated	
Astra TV Awards	December 8, 2024	Best Actress in a Streaming Comedy Series	Maya Rudolph	Nominated	
Black Reel Awards	August 13, 2024	Outstanding Lead Performance in a Comedy Series	Maya Rudolph	Nominated	
Black Reel Awards	August 13, 2024	Outstanding Directing in a Comedy Series	Kevin Bray (for "Clueless")	Nominated	
NAACP Image Awards	February 25, 2023	Outstanding Actress in a Comedy Series	Maya Rudolph	Nominated	
Primetime Emmy Awards	September 15, 2024	Outstanding Lead Actress in a Comedy Series	Maya Rudolph	Nominated	
