= Sue Galloway =

American comedian

- Born: Malvern, Pennsylvania, U.S.
- Education: University of Pittsburgh; Actors Studio Drama School
- Occupations: Actress; comedian; writer
- Years active: 2002–present
- Spouse: John Lutz
- Children: 2
- Website: www.suegalloway.com

Sue Galloway is an American actress, comedian, and screenwriter. An Upright Citizens Brigade Theatre alumna and teacher, she is best known for playing Sue Laroche-Van der Hout on the NBC sitcom 30 Rock. Since 2002, Galloway has been an active member of the longtime Upright Citizens Brigade (UCB) troupe.

== Career ==
In 2002, Galloway enrolled in the Upright Citizens Brigade Theatre in New York City as a sketch comedy student. While there, fellow UCB comedian Anthony Atamanuik submitted Galloway's name to NBC producers looking to hire a female extra for the upcoming television series 30 Rock. She was originally hired to play "Girl Writer": a staff writer with no lines and occasional reaction shots. By season three, Galloway's role was developed into a French-Dutch character named Sue LaRoche-Van der Hout.

Galloway has performed in live theater, television commercials, and film. She created and performed in a one-woman show called POSE Magazine and has produced and starred in various web series and shorts with fellow actress and comedian Pam Murphy. Galloway was a freelance writer for Weekend Update on Saturday Night Live.

Galloway currently performs weekly with the UCB improvisational sketch comedy group The Law Firm. "This is what I was born to do," said Galloway.

== Personal life ==
Galloway grew up in Malvern, Pennsylvania. She graduated from the University of Pittsburgh and the Actors Studio Drama School. Galloway is married to former Saturday Night Live writer and 30 Rock co-star John Lutz, with whom she has two children.

Comedy influences cited by Galloway include Carol Burnett, Amy Poehler, Betty White, and Phil Hartman.

== Filmography ==
=== Acting ===
Year(s)	Title	Role	Notes
2007	The Jeannie Tate Show	Stickerbook	1 episode
2006-2013	30 Rock	Sue	35 episodes
2007	Babylon Fields	Mrs. Denise Ryan	TV movie
2008	Defenders of Slan	Susie	TV Short
2008	Fat Guy Stuck in Internet	Villager / Townswoman	3 episodes
2009	The Bartender		1 episode
2011	Office Mates		4 episodes
2012	Eugene!	Suburban Mom	TV movie
2012	Belle & Bernice: Livin’ in the City	Belle	8 episodes
2009-2012	UCB Comedy Originals	Sue	23 episodes
2015	Sisters	Joelen Barme	
2016	The Characters	Stephanie	2 episodes
2016	Odd Squad: The Movie	Weird Sue	
2012-2017	Above Average Presents	Belle	7 episodes
2020	Escape from Virtual Island	Judicial Officer (Voice)	11 episodes
2020-2021	The Truth	Beth-Liz-Marcia	3 episodes
2022	Inside Amy Schumer		1 episode

=== Writing ===
Year(s)	Title	Role	Notes
2007	UCB Comedy Originals	Writer	3 episodes
2012	Belle & Bernice: Livin’ in the City	Creator - Writer	8 episodes
2013	Above Average Presents	Writer	1 episode
2013	Escape from Brooklyn	Creator	6 episodes

=== Producing ===
Year(s)	Title	Role	Notes
2013	Escape from Brooklyn	Producer	6 episodes
