= Maya Rudolph =

American actress and comedian (born 1972)

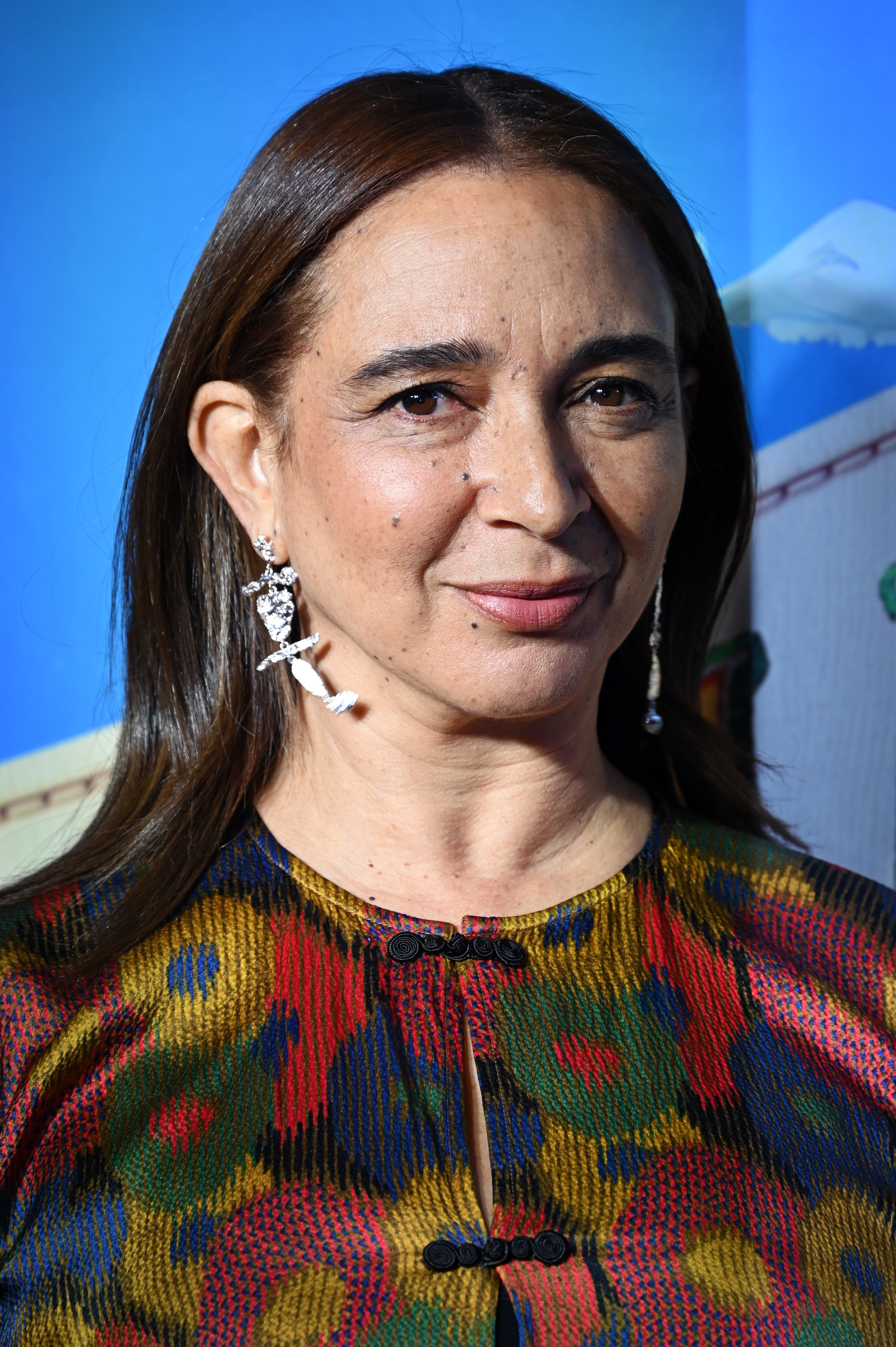
- Rudolph in 2026
- Born: July 27, 1972 (age 54); Gainesville, Florida, U.S.
- Education: University of California, Santa Cruz (BA)
- Occupations: Actress; comedian
- Years active: 1996–present
- Partner: Paul Thomas Anderson (2002–present) (Note: Since the birth of their first child, Rudolph has referred to Anderson as her husband, although they are not legally married.)
- Children: 4
- Parents: Richard Rudolph (father); Minnie Riperton (mother)
- Relatives: Kimiko Kasai (stepmother)

Maya Rudolph (born July 27, 1972) is an American actress and comedian. In 2000, she became a cast member on the NBC sketch comedy show Saturday Night Live (SNL). During her tenure on the show, she appeared in supporting roles in the films 50 First Dates (2004), A Prairie Home Companion (2006), and Idiocracy (2006).

After leaving SNL in 2007, Rudolph appeared in more films, including Grown Ups (2010), Bridesmaids (2011), Grown Ups 2 (2013), Inherent Vice (2014), Sisters (2015), Life of the Party (2018), and Disenchanted (2022). She also provided voice acting roles in the animated films Shrek the Third (2007), Turbo (2013), Big Hero 6 (2014), The Angry Birds Movie (2016), The Emoji Movie (2017), and Luca (2021). Rudolph starred in the NBC sitcom Up All Night (2011–2012) and co-hosted the variety show Maya & Marty (2016). Since 2022, she has executive produced and starred in the comedy series Loot.

Rudolph has voiced various characters for the animated sitcom Big Mouth (2017–2025), including Connie the Hormone Monstress, which won her four Primetime Emmy Awards. For her portrayal of politician Kamala Harris on SNL, she won the Primetime Emmy Award for Outstanding Guest Actress in a Comedy Series. Rudolph received three Primetime Emmy Award nominations for playing The Judge in the comedy series The Good Place (2018–2020). In 2024, Time named her one of the 100 most influential people in the world. She is the daughter of late singer Minnie Riperton (1947–1979) and composer Richard Rudolph, as well as the stepdaughter of retired Japanese jazz singer Kimiko Kasai.

== Early life ==
Rudolph was born on July 27, 1972, in Gainesville, Florida. Her mother, Minnie Riperton, was a singer, and her father, Richard Rudolph, is a composer. Her mother was African-American and her father is Jewish. Her paternal grandfather was Sidney Rudolph, a philanthropist who once owned all of the Wendy's and Rudy's restaurants in Miami-Dade County, Florida. Her great-grandfather was born in Vilnius, Lithuania, changed his surname from "Rudashevsky" to "Rudolph", and was one of the founding members of Congregation Beth Shalom, a Conservative Jewish synagogue in the Squirrel Hill neighborhood of Pittsburgh, Pennsylvania. Rudolph's godmother was R&B singer Teena Marie (1956–2010). On an episode of PBS's Finding Your Roots, Rudolph discovered that her maternal great-great-great-grandfather was James Grigsby, who was born into slavery in Lincoln County, Kentucky. Grigsby was denied financial compensation and freedom granted by the last will and testament of his enslaver, John Warren Grigsby, and challenged the enslaver's grandson in court in the 1830s.

Rudolph's parents moved to Los Angeles, California, when their children were very young, and Rudolph grew up primarily in the Westwood neighborhood. Near the end of the song "Lovin' You", Riperton repeats "Maya", as can be heard in her performance on The Midnight Special. Riperton died of breast cancer on July 12, 1979, at the age of 31, two weeks before Maya's seventh birthday. In 1990, Rudolph graduated from Crossroads School in Santa Monica, California, where she befriended schoolmates Gwyneth Paltrow and Jack Black. She attended the University of California, Santa Cruz, living in Porter College. In 1995, she graduated with a Bachelor of Arts degree in photography.

== Career ==
=== Television and film ===
==== Saturday Night Live ====
Rudolph was in the improv troupe the Groundlings, where she met future Saturday Night Live cast member Will Forte. She joined the cast of Saturday Night Live as a featured player for the final three episodes of the 1999–2000 season and stayed until 2007. Her impersonations while on the show included Oprah Winfrey, Christina Aguilera, and Donatella Versace. She has made several cameo appearances over the years. Since the 45th-season premiere, she has occasionally portrayed Vice President Kamala Harris, a performance acknowledged by Harris. After Harris became the presumptive 2024 Democratic presidential candidate, Rudolph agreed to portray Harris on SNL through the 2024 election; pre-production on season 3 of her show Loot was postponed to accommodate her role. For her portrayal of Harris, she won the Primetime Emmy Award for Outstanding Guest Actress in a Comedy Series.

==== Other roles ====
Rudolph appeared in many other television shows, including the CBS medical drama series City of Angels and Chicago Hope. She had small parts in Gattaca (1997), As Good as It Gets (1997), Chuck & Buck (2000), Duets (2000), Duplex (2003), and 50 First Dates (2004); she was also a music supervisor for Duets. Her first prominent film role came in 2006 with A Prairie Home Companion. That same year, she co-starred with Luke Wilson in the Mike Judge sci-fi comedy Idiocracy, although the film was only given a limited release. She also guest-starred as Rapunzel in the 2007 DreamWorks animated film Shrek the Third. She guest-starred as Julia in The Simpsons episode "The Homer of Seville". Rudolph guest-starred as character Athena Scooberman in NBC's Kath & Kim, and starred in the 2009 film Away We Go with The Office star John Krasinski.

In 2010, she appeared in Grown Ups starring Adam Sandler, where she played the wife of Chris Rock's character, and returned for the 2013 sequel, Grown Ups 2. In 2011, she appeared in Bridesmaids with Saturday Night Live colleague Kristen Wiig, and in 2013 she played a supporting role in The Way, Way Back as the girlfriend of Sam Rockwell's character. From 2011 to 2012, she co-starred in the NBC sitcom Up All Night, with Christina Applegate and Will Arnett. In 2013, she voiced Burn in the DreamWorks Animation film Turbo. Rudolph's self-titled variety show television pilot aired on May 19, 2014, but the show did not go beyond that. Also in 2014, she voiced Precious in the animated film The Nut Job, as well as in the 2017 sequel The Nut Job 2: Nutty by Nature, and voiced Aunt Cass in the Disney animated film Big Hero 6. She also starred in Paul Thomas Anderson's 2014 crime comedy-drama Inherent Vice, and the 2015 comedy Sisters, where she reunited with former SNL colleagues Tina Fey and Amy Poehler.

It was later announced that she would star in an NBC variety series Maya & Marty with Martin Short, which debuted on May 31, 2016. Her next series, Forever, premiered on September 14, 2018, on Amazon Video. As a voice actress, she voiced Matilda in The Angry Birds Movie (2016) and The Angry Birds Movie 2 (2019), voiced Smiler in the animated The Emoji Movie (2017), and had various roles in the Netflix animated series Big Mouth, premiering in 2017.

In 2018, she performed in advertisements for Ruby Tuesday and Seventh Generation. Also in 2018, she played Christine, the best friend of Melissa McCarthy's character, in the 2018 comedy film Life of the Party. From 2018 to 2020, Rudolph played a judge in the comedy series The Good Place, and received three Primetime Emmy Award nominations for her role. In 2019, she appeared as the mother in The Lego Movie 2: The Second Part. In 2021 she voiced Linda Mitchell, mother of two, in Sony Pictures' The Mitchells vs. the Machines, and Daniela Paguro in the Pixar film Luca. In July 2022 she appeared as the star of Loot, an Apple TV+ series. In 2022, Rudolph portrayed Malvina Monroe, the main antagonist of Disenchanted, the sequel to the 2007 Disney film Enchanted.

Rudolph has a production company called Animal Pictures with Natasha Lyonne which has produced Russian Doll, Poker Face, Loot, and The Second Best Hospital in the Galaxy. As of October 3, 2023, Rudolph reportedly separated amicably from Animal Pictures to produce independently. In 2023, it was announced that Rudolph would be the spokesperson for M&M's after owner Mars Inc. supposedly pulled its "Spokescandies" in light of criticism for its depictions of gender.

Rudolph made her Broadway debut in April 2026, performing as Mary Todd Lincoln in Oh, Mary! for a ten-week engagement.

=== Music ===
Prior to joining Saturday Night Live, Rudolph was a backing vocalist from 1995 to 1999 and a keyboardist in the Rentals, with whom she toured. She appears in music videos for the songs "Waiting" and "Please Let That Be You". In 2004, she recorded a track with the Rentals frontman Matt Sharp, including a cover of Tegan and Sara's "Not Tonight". She was the original drummer of That Dog before moving to attend college. She performed "Together in Pooping" and "Little Roundworm" with Triumph the Insult Comic Dog (Robert Smigel) on his album Come Poop With Me. She is in a Prince cover band called Princess with friend Gretchen Lieberum.

== Personal life ==
Rudolph has been in a long-term relationship with filmmaker Paul Thomas Anderson since 2002. They have never married. They have four children together.

== Filmography ==
=== Film ===
Year	Title	Role	Notes
1997	As Good as It Gets	Policewoman	
1997	Gattaca	Delivery Nurse	
2000	Chuck & Buck	Jamilla	
2000	Duets	Karaoke Hostess	
2003	Duplex	Tara	
2004	Wake Up, Ron Burgundy: The Lost Movie	Kanshasha X	
2004	50 First Dates	Stacy	
2006	A Prairie Home Companion	Molly	
2006	Idiocracy	Rita	
2007	Shrek the Third	Rapunzel	Voice only
2009	Away We Go	Verona De Tessant	
2010	MacGruber	Casey Fitzpatrick	
2010	Grown Ups	Deanne McKenzie	
2011	Beastie Boys: Fight for Your Right (Revisited)	Skirt Suit	Short film
2011	Bridesmaids	Lillian Donovan	
2011	Zookeeper	Mollie	Voice only
2011	Friends with Kids	Leslie	
2013	The Way, Way Back	Caitlyn	
2013	Grown Ups 2	Deanne McKenzie	
2013	Turbo	Burn	Voice only
2014	The Nut Job	Precious	Voice only
2014	Inherent Vice	Petunia Leeway	
2014	Big Hero 6	Aunt Cass	Voice only
2015	Strange Magic	Griselda	Voice only
2015	Maggie's Plan	Felicia	
2015	A Very Murray Christmas	Lounge Singer	
2015	Sisters	Brinda	
2016	Mr. Pig	Eunice	
2016	The Angry Birds Movie	Matilda / Poppy	Voices only; uncredited for Poppy
2016	Popstar: Never Stop Never Stopping	Deborah	
2016	My Entire High School Sinking into the Sea	Verti	
2017	CHiPs	Sergeant Gail Hernandez	
2017	We Don't Belong Here	Joanne	
2017	The Emoji Movie	Smiler	Voice only
2017	The Nut Job 2: Nutty by Nature	Precious	Voice only
2018	Life of the Party	Christine Davenport	
2018	Love, Gilda	Herself	Documentary
2018	The Happytime Murders	Bubbles	
2019	The Lego Movie 2: The Second Part	Mom	
2019	Booksmart	Motivational Voice	
2019	Wine Country	Naomi	
2019	The Angry Birds Movie 2	Matilda	Voice only
2020	The Willoughbys	Nanny	Voice only
2020	Thirsty	The Mosquit	Short film; Voice only
2020	Hubie Halloween	Mrs. Mary Hennessey	
2021	The Mitchells vs. the Machines	Linda Mitchell	Voice only
2021	Luca	Daniela Paguro	Voice only
2021	Licorice Pizza	Gale	
2022	Disenchanted	Malvina Monroe	
2023	Teenage Mutant Ninja Turtles: Mutant Mayhem	Cynthia Utrom	Voice only
2023	His Three Daughters	—N/a	Executive producer
2023	Good Burger 2	Herself	Voice only
2024	IF	Ally	Voice only
2026	Lorne	Herself	Documentary
TBA	Grown Ups 3	Deanne McKenzie	Filming

=== Television ===
Year	Title	Role	Notes
1996–1997	Chicago Hope	Nurse Leah Martine	5 episodes
1997	The Devil's Child	Holly	Television film
2000	Action	Phina	Episode: "Dead Man Floating"
2000	City of Angels	Nurse Grace Patterson	15 episodes
2000–2007	Saturday Night Live	Various roles	143 episodes
2006	Campus Ladies	Professor Theresa Winslow Fabre	Episode: "All Nighter"
2007	The Simpsons	Julia (voice)	Episode: "Homer of Seville"
2008–2009	Kath & Kim	Athena Scooberman	5 episodes
2009	The Mighty B!	Cherry (voice)	Episode: "The Dragonflies"
2011–2012	Up All Night	Ava Alexander	35 episodes
2012	Sesame Street	Herself	Episode: "The Very End of X"
2012, 2021, 2024	Saturday Night Live	Herself (host)	3 episodes
2013	Hollywood Help	Maya	2 episodes
2014	Portlandia	Anita	Episode: "Bahama Knights"
2014	The Maya Rudolph Show	Herself	Variety special; also producer
2014	Family Guy	JoAnne Shalit (voice)	Episode: "The Book of Joe"
2014–2015	The Awesomes	Lady Malocchio (voice)	9 episodes
2015	Comedy Bang! Bang!	Herself	Episode: "Maya Rudolph Wears a Black Skirt and Strappy Sandals"
2015	The Spoils Before Dying	Fresno Foxglove	4 episodes
2015	Drunk History	Griselda Blanco	Episode: "Miami"
2016	Angie Tribeca	Jackie Wilder	Episode: "Organ Trail"
2016	Maya & Marty	Herself / co-host	6 episodes; also writer and producer
2016	Brothers in Atlanta	Shirley	Television film
2016	Brooklyn Nine-Nine	U.S. Marshal Karen Haas	Episodes: "Coral Palms, Part 1" & "Coral Palms, Part 2"
2016	Documentary Now!	Anita	Episode: "Final Transmission"
2016	The Grinder	Jillian	4 episodes
2016, 2018	Mike Tyson Mysteries	Various Voices	2 episodes
2017	Michael Bolton's Big, Sexy Valentine's Day Special	Herself	Variety special
2017	Nobodies	Herself	Episode: "Mr. First Lady"
2017	Unbreakable Kimmy Schmidt	Dionne Warwick	Episode: "Kimmy Does a Puzzle!"
2017	Tour de Pharmacy	Lucy Flerng	Television film
2017	The Gong Show	Herself / Judge	Episode: "Megan Fox/Andy Samberg/Maya Rudolph"
2017–2025	Big Mouth	Diane Birch / Connie / various voices	81 episodes
2017–2021	Big Hero 6: The Series	Aunt Cass (voice)	31 episodes
2017	A Christmas Story Live!	Mother Parker	Television film
2018–2020	The Good Place	Judge Gen	12 episodes
2018	Forever	June Hoffman	8 episodes; also executive producer
2018	I Love You, America with Sarah Silverman	Lady Liberty	Episode: "Cory Booker"
2019	The Unauthorized Bash Brothers Experience	Val Gal	Variety special
2019	Nailed It!	Herself / Judge	Episode: "A Classic Christmess"
2019–2021	Bless the Harts	Betty Hart, Norma (voice)	Series regular
2020	Mapleworth Murders	Broda Bcbillan	3 episodes
2020	Eater's Guide to the World	Herself / narrator	7 episodes
2020	Sarah Cooper: Everything's Fine	Andrea Steele	Television special; also executive producer
2021	A Clüsterfünke Christmas	Shania Gary	Comedy Central film
2021	MacGruber	Casey	2 episodes
2021–2023	Baking It	Herself / host	12 episodes; also executive producer
2022	Baymax!	Aunt Cass (voice)	2 episodes; Disney+ miniseries
2022	Murderville	Herself	Episode: "Who Killed Santa? A Murderville Murder Mystery"
2022–2023	Human Resources	Connie / Bonnie (voice)	20 episodes; also consulting producer
2022–present	Loot	Molly Novak née Wells	Main role; also executive producer
2023	Digman!	G.A.W.D. (voice)	Episode: "Fear of GAWD"
2024	Dinner Time Live with David Chang	Herself / guest	Episode: "The Spring Menu"
2024	Dream Productions	Jean Dewberry (voice)	4 episodes
2024–2025	The Second Best Hospital in the Galaxy	Dr. Vlam (voice)	Main role; also executive producer
2026	The Muppet Show	Herself	Television special

=== Video games ===
Year	Title	Role	Notes
2019	Vader Immortal: A Star Wars VR Series	ZO-E3	

=== Theater ===
Year	Title	Role	Venue	Notes
2008	Untitled Paul Thomas Anderson stage play	Various	Largo at the Coronet	
2026	Oh, Mary!	Mary Todd Lincoln	Lyceum Theatre	Broadway debut

=== Music videos ===
Year	Title	Artist(s)	Role	Ref.
1995	"Waiting"	The Rentals		
2005	"Please Let That Be You"	The Rentals		
2006	"Dick in a Box"	The Lonely Island featuring Justin Timberlake	Girlfriend	
2011	"Make Some Noise"	Beastie Boys	Metal Chick	
2013	"Hugs"	The Lonely Island featuring Pharrell Williams	Drug dealing '80s Oprah	
2020	"Imagine"	Gal Gadot & Friends	Herself	
2024	"Sushi Glory Hole"	The Lonely Island	Businesswoman	

== Awards and nominations ==
Association	Year	Category	Work	Result	Ref
Black Reel Awards	2010	Outstanding Actress	Away We Go	Nominated	
Black Reel Awards	2012	Outstanding Supporting Actress	Bridesmaids	Nominated	
Black Reel Awards	2014	Outstanding Voice Performance	Turbo	Nominated	
Black Reel Awards	2015	Outstanding Voice Performance	Big Hero 6	Nominated	
Black Reel Awards	2016	Outstanding Voice Performance	Strange Magic	Nominated	
Black Reel Awards	2018	Outstanding Voice Performance	The Emoji Movie	Nominated	
Black Reel Awards	2018	Outstanding Voice Performance	The Nut Job 2: Nutty by Nature	Nominated	
Black Reel Awards	2019	Outstanding Guest Actress, Comedy Series	The Good Place	Nominated	
Black Reel Awards	2020	Outstanding Guest Actress, Comedy Series	The Good Place	Won	
Black Reel Awards	2021	Outstanding Guest Actress, Comedy Series	Saturday Night Live	Nominated	
Black Reel Awards	2021	Outstanding Voice Performance	The Willoughbys	Nominated	
Black Reel Awards	2022	Outstanding Voice Performance	The Mitchells vs. the Machines	Won	
Black Reel Awards	2022	Outstanding Voice Performance	Luca	Nominated	
Black Reel Awards	2024	Outstanding Lead Performance, Comedy Series	Loot	Nominated	
Chicago Film Critics Association	2009	Best Actress	Away We Go	Nominated	
Children's and Family Emmy Awards	2025	Outstanding Single Voice Role Performer	Dream Productions	Nominated	
Critics' Choice Super Awards	2021	Best Voice Actress in an Animated Movie	The Willoughbys	Nominated	
Critics' Choice Super Awards	2021	Best Voice Actress in an Animated Series	Big Mouth	Nominated	
Gotham Independent Film Awards	2006	Best Ensemble Performance	A Prairie Home Companion	Nominated	
Independent Spirit Awards	2014	Robert Altman Award (shared with rest of cast)	Inherent Vice	Won	
NAACP Image Awards	2007	Outstanding Actress in a Comedy Series	Saturday Night Live	Nominated	
NAACP Image Awards	2012	Outstanding Supporting Actress in a Comedy Series	Up All Night	Nominated	
NAACP Image Awards	2022	Outstanding Guest Actor or Actress in a Television Series	Saturday Night Live	Won	
NAACP Image Awards	2023	Outstanding Actress in a Comedy Series	Loot	Nominated	
NAACP Image Awards	2025	Outstanding Guest Performance	Saturday Night Live	Nominated	
MTV Movie Awards	2012	Best Jaw Dropping Moment (shared with rest of cast)	Bridesmaids	Won	
Primetime Emmy Awards	2012	Outstanding Guest Actress in a Comedy Series	Saturday Night Live (Episode: "Maya Rudolph/Sleigh Bells")	Nominated	
Primetime Emmy Awards	2018	Outstanding Guest Actress in a Comedy Series	The Good Place	Nominated	
Primetime Emmy Awards	2019	Outstanding Guest Actress in a Comedy Series	The Good Place	Nominated	
Primetime Emmy Awards	2020	Outstanding Guest Actress in a Comedy Series	The Good Place	Nominated	
Primetime Emmy Awards	2020	Outstanding Guest Actress in a Comedy Series	Saturday Night Live (Episode: "Eddie Murphy/Lizzo")	Won	
Primetime Emmy Awards	2020	Outstanding Character Voice-Over Performance	Big Mouth (Episode: "How To Have An Orgasm")	Won	
Primetime Emmy Awards	2021	Outstanding Guest Actress in a Comedy Series	Saturday Night Live (Episode: "Maya Rudolph/Jack Harlow")	Won	
Primetime Emmy Awards	2021	Outstanding Character Voice-Over Performance	Big Mouth (Episode: "A Very Special 9/11 Episode")	Won	
Primetime Emmy Awards	2022	Outstanding Character Voice-Over Performance	Big Mouth (Episode: "A Very Big Mouth Christmas")	Nominated	
Primetime Emmy Awards	2023	Outstanding Host for a Reality or Competition Program	Baking It (shared with Amy Poehler)	Nominated	
Primetime Emmy Awards	2023	Outstanding Character Voice-Over Performance	Big Mouth (Episode: "Asexual Healing")	Won	
Primetime Emmy Awards	2024	Outstanding Lead Actress in a Comedy Series	Loot	Nominated	
Primetime Emmy Awards	2024	Outstanding Guest Actress in a Comedy Series	Saturday Night Live (Episode: "Maya Rudolph/Vampire Weekend")	Nominated	
Primetime Emmy Awards	2024	Outstanding Music & Lyrics	Saturday Night Live (Song: "Maya Rudolph's Mother's Day Monologue")	Nominated	
Primetime Emmy Awards	2024	Outstanding Character Voice-Over Performance	Big Mouth (Episode: "The Ambition Gremlin")	Won	
Primetime Emmy Awards	2025	Outstanding Character Voice-Over Performance	Big Mouth (Episode: "Why Do We Go Through Puberty?")	Nominated	
Satellite Awards	2004	Best Actress in a TV Series – Comedy or Musical	Saturday Night Live	Nominated	
Satellite Awards	2011	Best Supporting Actress in a TV Series, Mini Series or TV Movie	Up All Night	Nominated	
Satellite Awards	2012	Best Supporting Actress in a TV Series, Mini Series or TV Movie	Up All Night	Nominated	
Screen Actors Guild Awards	2012	Outstanding Performance by a Cast in a Motion Picture	Bridesmaids	Nominated	
Writers Guild of America Award	2016	Comedy/Variety – Sketch Series	Maya & Marty	Nominated	
