= James Anderson (American writer) =

American television writer and actor

- Born: United States
- Occupation: Comedy writer, producer, actor
- Genre: Television, film, comedy

James Anderson is an American television writer and actor. From 2000 to 2020, he was a writer for NBC's Saturday Night Live (SNL).

On SNL, he usually wrote with Kristen Wiig, and then with Cecily Strong. He wrote or co-wrote many queer-themed sketches like "Gays in Space" and "GP Yass". Anderson played himself on an episode of the network's series 30 Rock.

He co-created the web series Hudson Valley Ballers with a fellow SNL writer and his longtime friend, Paula Pell, with whom he also co-stars. He also guest starred in the comedy mystery series Mapleworth Murders, created by Pell.
