= Hudson Valley Ballers =

- Genre: Comedy
- Created by: Paula Pell; James Anderson
- Starring: Paula Pell; James Anderson
- Country of origin: United States
- Original language: English

Original release
- Release: 2013 – 2015

Hudson Valley Ballers is an American web series created by Paula Pell and James Anderson with whom she also co-stars.

== Overview ==
Hudson Valley Ballers follows two comedy writers who leave their city jobs to run a bed and breakfast in the rural Hudson Valley.

== Critical reception ==
Bustle wrote "Perhaps the best piece of advice for watching Hudson Valley Ballers is to just, you know, "go with it." If you do, I promise... you'll have a great time."

The Guardian said "The show stars Pell and Anderson as comedy writers who leave their high-stress jobs for a more low-key life in the country as bed-and-breakfast owners. What happens is anything but laid-back, with a stream of strange guests (think an intense Natasha Lyonne demanding wine), stranger love interests (Paul Rudd as a muralist for Olive Garden who does voiceovers for porn), and household horrors (did that doll just move?) interrupting their country idyll."

USA Today wrote "Though you may not recognize Paula Pell's name, there's a good chance she has made you laugh so hard it hurts. Pell is a longtime writer for Saturday Night Live who has also contributed her comedic talents to Bridesmaids and 30 Rock. This week she and fellow SNL writer James Anderson launched a very funny web series, Hudson Valley Ballers, which features appearances by Paul Rudd and Kate McKinnon."
