= Hayley Magnus =

Australian actress

- Born: Australia
- Occupation: Actress
- Notable work: Mapleworth Murders

Hayley Magnus is an Australian actress. She was nominated for Most Popular New Talent at the 2017 Logie Awards for her role in the Network Ten TV series The Wrong Girl.

Magnus played the main roles of Simone in The Wrong Girl and Heidi in Mapleworth Murders. Other screen roles include Slide, Childhood's End and films The Dressmaker and Sick Girl.
