= Sisters (2015 film) =

2015 comedy film directed by Jason Moore

- Theatrical release poster
- Directed by: Jason Moore
- Written by: Paula Pell
- Produced by: Tina Fey; Jay Roach; John Lyons
- Starring: Tina Fey; Amy Poehler; Maya Rudolph; Ike Barinholtz; James Brolin; John Cena; John Leguizamo; Dianne Wiest
- Cinematography: Barry Peterson
- Edited by: Lee Haxall
- Music by: Christophe Beck
- Production companies: Little Stranger; Everyman Pictures
- Distributed by: Universal Pictures
- Release dates: December 9, 2015 (Ziegfeld Theatre); December 18, 2015 (United States)
- Running time: 118 minutes
- Country: United States
- Language: English
- Budget: $33 million (gross); $25.5 million (net)
- Box office: $106 million

Sisters is a 2015 American comedy film directed by Jason Moore, written by Paula Pell and is the second collaboration between Tina Fey and Amy Poehler following the film Baby Mama (2008). The rest of the cast consists of Maya Rudolph, Ike Barinholtz, James Brolin, John Cena, John Leguizamo, Bobby Moynihan, and Dianne Wiest.

The film centers on adult sisters Kate (Fey), an irresponsible single mother, and Maura (Poehler), a kindhearted nurse and recent divorcee, who are summoned back to their childhood home by their parents to clean out their old bedroom before the house is sold. Upset and angry that all their childhood memories will be gone, Kate convinces Maura to have one last wild house party, but things soon get out of control.

The film was released on December 18, 2015, by Universal Pictures. It received mixed reviews and grossed $106 million on a production budget of $33 million.

== Plot ==
Maura Ellis, a recently divorced, hardworking nurse, is asked by her parents Deana and Bucky to return to her childhood Orlando home and clean out her bedroom before the house is sold. Her parents also ask that she tell her sister Kate, an irresponsible nail stylist whose teenaged daughter Haley secretly lives with Maura.

Maura calls Kate but instead convinces her to come to Orlando, as Kate has been kicked out of her apartment. Upon reaching their childhood home, the sisters discover the house has already sold with every room emptied except their bedroom. The parents inform them that they need to finish cleaning out by the end of the weekend. Kate convinces Maura to throw one last party at the house before the new owners move in.

The next morning, the new homeowners tell the sisters that the home needs to be in perfect condition to sell. Moving forward with their party plans, Kate and Maura invite most of their friends from high school, excluding Kate's rival, Brinda. While looking for party decorations, they have a run-in with her, who is upset about not being invited. Maura invites her nail stylist to the party and tries to convince Kate to apply for a nail salon job. Kate convinces the owner to pretend to hire her.

During the sisters' shopping for dresses, Haley calls Kate to check in with her. She hands her phone to Maura, who convinces her that her mother has changed for the better, so she buys a plane ticket to Orlando to surprise her. Kate forces Maura to ask James, a man they hit on earlier, to come to their party and reluctantly agrees to remain sober.

The sisters' high school classmates arrive but have matured and do not want a wild party. Kate and Maura give a speech to their guests and ask their friend Dave to invite his drug dealer Pazuzu. More of their friends show up, and the party becomes more lively. Brinda arrives uninvited, and Kate kicks her out. James also arrives, and he and Maura try to hold a conversation but keep getting interrupted. Seeking revenge, Brinda calls in a noise complaint to the police, although Kate and Maura flirt and talk their way out of trouble.

As the party spins out of control, Haley calls her mother to surprise her about being in town but, upon learning about the party, lashes out at Kate for her lack of responsibility. She starts drinking as Haley unfairly supposes she is drunk. After Brinda again sneaks in, she and Kate resolve their mutual dislike. Meanwhile, Maura sneaks off with James, but she falls through the ceiling, and James falls on her childhood ballerina music box, prompting him to leave.

Kate learns that her parents have decided to give her a portion of the proceeds from the sale of the house to allow her to attempt a fresh start. She tries to end the party early despite the recent destruction to the house. She calls the police with a fake noise complaint, but the responding officer recalls that Maura was kind to his disabled cousin years ago and declines to shut down the party. Maura leaves her room and is horrified to see the mess, as well as a drunk Kate. At the same time, Kate learns that Maura has been housing Haley and is incensed.

As the sisters fight, Haley, Deana, and Bucky arrive. The backyard pool suddenly becomes a sinkhole, Haley falls in, and Kate jumps to the rescue. After expelling the guests, the parents tell Kate and Maura that they need to get their lives in order.

The next morning, Deana and Bucky refuse Maura's offer to help pay for the damages, but reluctantly allow Kate to stay for two weeks while she and James begin home repairs. The sisters reconcile, and Kate convinces Maura to try reconnecting with James. The parents ultimately sell the repaired house with Brinda as their real estate agent. Kate opens a nail salon in Orlando while Maura and James begin dating. The film closes with the Ellis family and James celebrating Christmas at the parents' new home.

== Cast ==
- Tina Fey as Katherine Anne "Kate" Ellis, the irresponsible single mother to teenager Haley, and Maura's older sister.
- Amy Poehler as Maura Ellis, a gentle, sweet nurse, Kate's younger sister, and Haley's aunt.
- Maya Rudolph as Brinda, Kate's jealous, arrogant arch rival. They were close friends until Brinda snitched on the Ellis sisters about a house party and got it shut down.
- Ike Barinholtz as James, a kind man who lives next door to the Ellis sisters and Maura's love interest.
- Dianne Wiest as Deana Ellis, Kate and Maura's mother and Haley's grandmother.
- James Brolin as Bucky Ellis, Kate and Maura's father and Haley's grandfather.
- John Leguizamo as Dave, a former classmate of Kate and Maura.
- John Cena as Pazuzu, Dave's drug dealer.
- Bobby Moynihan as Alex
- Greta Lee as Hae Won
- Madison Davenport as Haley Ellis, Kate's teenage daughter, Maura's niece, and Bucky and Deana's granddaughter.
- Rachel Dratch as Kelly
- Santino Fontana as Mr. Geernt
- Britt Lower as Mrs. Geernt
- Samantha Bee as Liz
- Matt Oberg as Rob
- Kate McKinnon as Sam
- Jon Glaser as Dan
- Renée Elise Goldsberry as Kim
- Chris Parnell as Phil
- Paula Pell as Dana
- Dan Byrd as Patrick Campbell
- Adrian Martinez as Officer Harris
- Brian d'Arcy James as Jerry
- Heather Matarazzo as Denny
- Ann Harada as Jean
- Emily Tarver as Brayla

== Production ==
The film was initially titled The Nest. On December 3, 2014, Universal Pictures announced it had been retitled to Sisters.

=== Casting ===
On June 5, 2014, Ike Barinholtz joined the cast of the film to play the male lead. On June 11, James Brolin was added to the cast to play Fey and Poehler's characters' father. On June 12, Greta Lee was added to the cast to play Hae Won, a nail stylist who gets a pity invite to the party. On June 13, Maya Rudolph joined the film to play the childhood friend of both sisters. On June 17, Madison Davenport joined the film to play Kate's daughter Hayley. On July 1, wrestler John Cena was added to the cast of the film, with Deadline reporting that he would play a villainous role. On July 16, Renée Elise Goldsberry was added to the cast to play Kim, a longtime friend of Poehler and Fey's characters.

=== Filming ===
Principal photography commenced on June 9, 2014, in White Plains, New York when director Moore tweeted some photos from the set. It was filmed in New York City through the end of July. On June 18, the crew shot some scenes in Haverstraw, New York. Fey and Poehler were spotted filming in Pearl River, New York. On June 24, filming was underway around Five Towns College in Dix Hills, New York. Filming also occurred at the Jon Megaris hair salon in nearby Huntington, New York on January 22, 2015.

== Release ==
Sisters was released in the United States on December 18, 2015. The film was released on DVD and Blu-ray on March 15, 2016.

== Reception ==
=== Box office ===
Sisters grossed $87 million in North America and $19 million in other territories for a worldwide total of $106 million, against a budget of $33 million.

In North America, Sisters opened on December 18, 2015, with box office projections expected to be hurt by Star Wars: The Force Awakens. In its opening weekend, the film was projected to gross $11 million from 2,961 theaters. The film grossed $5 million on its first day and $13.9 million in its opening weekend, finishing third at the box office behind Star Wars: The Force Awakens ($248 million) and Alvin and the Chipmunks: The Road Chip ($14.3 million).

=== Critical response ===
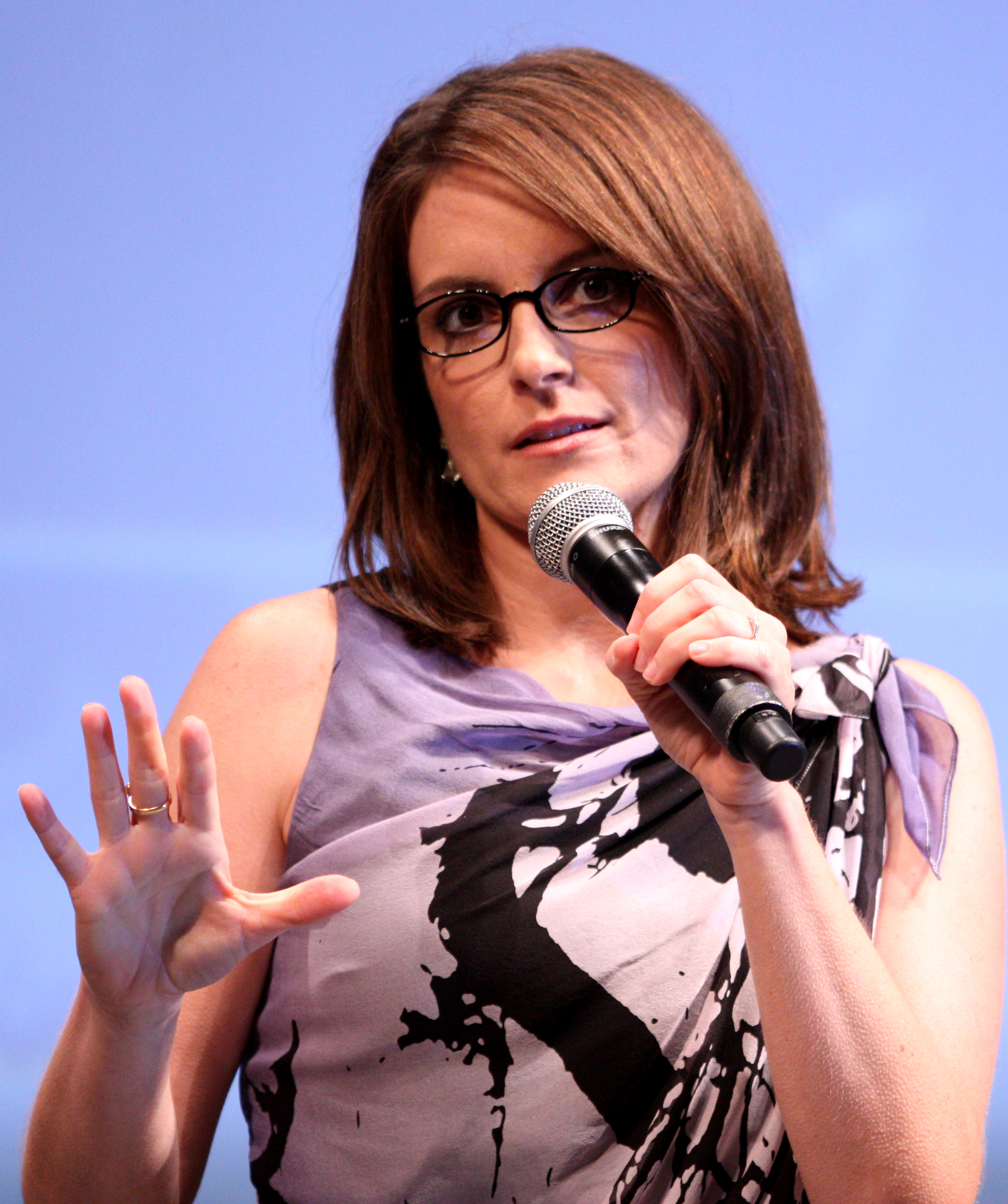
Fey received a Critics' Choice Movie Award for Best Actress in a Comedy nomination for her performance

On Rotten Tomatoes, the film holds an approval rating of 60% based on 178 reviews, with an average rating of 5.9/10. The website's critical consensus reads, "Sisters' sharp blend of pathos and vulgarity, along with Tina Fey and Amy Poehler's effervescent chemistry, are more than enough to make up for the handful of laughs this coming-of-age comedy leaves on the table." On Metacritic, the film has a weighted average score of 58 out of 100, based on 36 critics, indicating "mixed or average reviews". Audiences polled by CinemaScore gave the film an average grade of "B" on an A+ to F scale.

Guy Lodge of Variety gave the film a positive review, writing: "Beneath the film's entertainingly crude hijinks, there are actual human stakes here, as the two sisters recognize in each other the growing up they themselves need to do — though Pell’s script keeps the hugging and learning to a reasonable minimum." Ann Hornaday of The Washington Post also reacted positively, saying, "It takes superior artistry to take the rude, crude and socially unmentionable and make it feel upliftingly wholesome. Such is the magic of Tina Fey and Amy Poehler, the dynamic duo at the playful, prurient, occasionally perverse heart of Sisters." Many critics have positively compared the film to other recent successful female-centric comedies, such as Bridesmaids, Spy and Trainwreck.

Mark Olsen of the Los Angeles Times had a more mixed reaction, saying, "There is so much about its package – the stars, the premise, the talented supporting cast – that would make for a film of warmth, humor and insight on the struggles of leaving the past behind and getting out of your own way on the path to fulfilment. Instead, the movie settles for being a party comedy and little else." Richard Roeper of the Chicago Sun-Times gave the film one and a half stars out of four, but praised Fey and Poehler's performances, saying "though they look nothing like sisters, they’re believable as sisters. Every once in a while when we take a break from the thuddingly unfunny slapstick stuff, there’s a nice and genuine moment."

=== Accolades ===
Year	Award	Category	Recipients	Result
2016	Critics' Choice Movie Awards	Best Comedy	Sisters	Nominated
2016	Critics' Choice Movie Awards	Best Actress in a Comedy	Tina Fey	Nominated
2016	EDA Special Mention Awards	Movie You Wanted to Love But Just Couldn't	Sisters	Nominated
