= Paula Pell =

American comedy writer, producer and actress

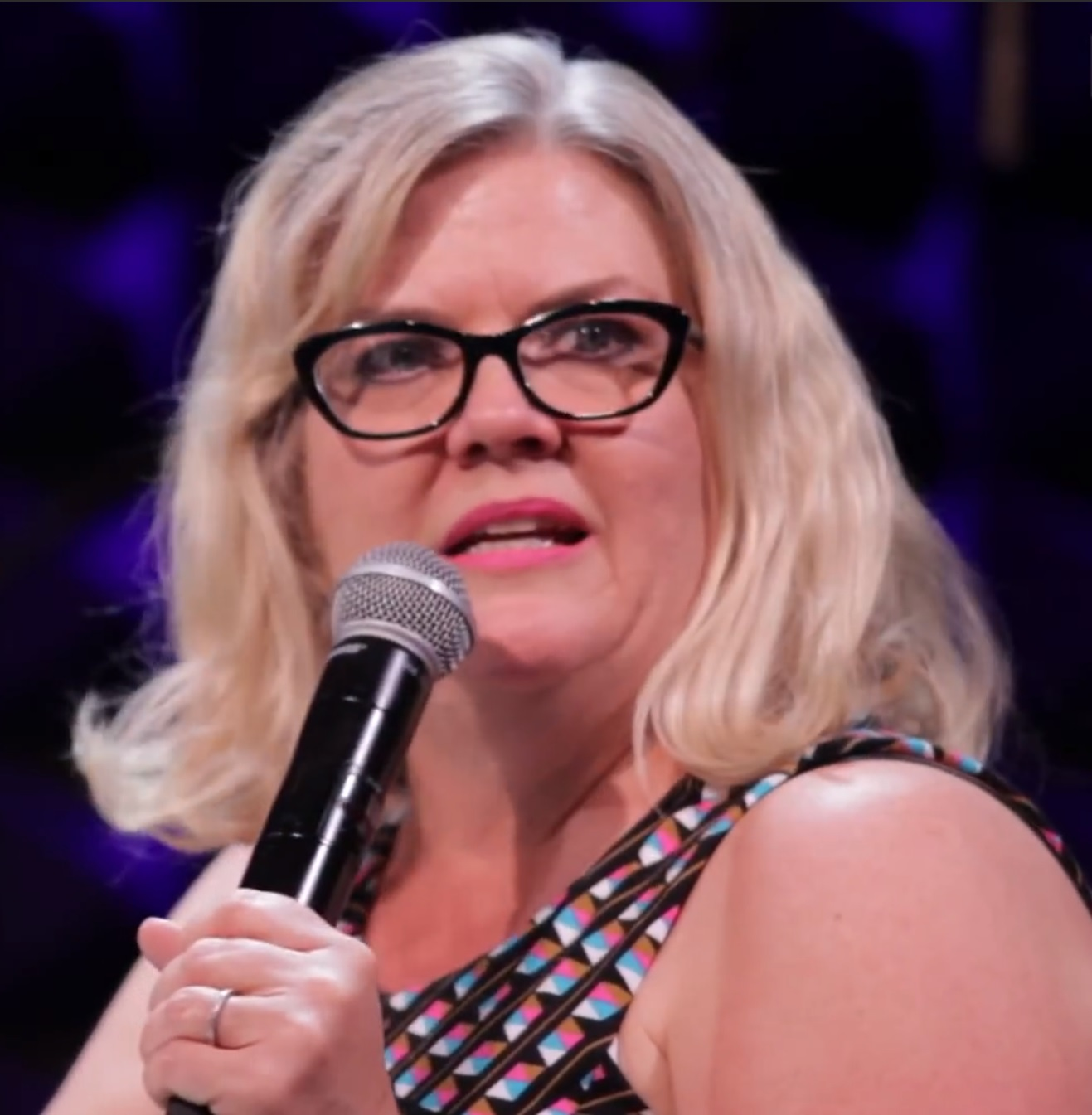
- Pell interviewed on Employee of the Month in 2014
- Education: University of Tennessee
- Occupations: Comedy writer, producer, actress
- Spouse: Janine Brito (m. 2020)
- Writing career
- Years active: 1991–present
- Genres: Television, film, comedy

Paula Pell is an American comedy writer, producer, and actress. She worked as a writer for the NBC sketch comedy series Saturday Night Live from 1995 to 2013. For her work on SNL and 30 Rock, she has been recognized with a Primetime Emmy Award for Outstanding Writing for a Variety, Music or Comedy Program and six Writers Guild of America Awards. In 2019, Pell was honored with the Herb Sargent Award for Comedy Excellence.

Pell has produced, written, and performed in the TV series 30 Rock, A.P. Bio, Love, and Mapleworth Murders, and has worked as a writer for the awards ceremonies the Academy Awards, the Golden Globes, and the MTV Video Music Awards. As a voiceover artist, she has voiced characters in Inside Out, Big Mouth, and Bless the Harts. Pell has also appeared in films and TV series, including Sisters, Other People, and Wine Country. From 2021 to 2024, Pell was a main cast member on the Peacock and Netflix original series Girls5eva.

== Early life ==
Pell wanted to be an actress from an early age. After graduating from the University of Tennessee, she took a job at Walt Disney World, working in the nightclubs of the resort's adults-only Pleasure Island section.

== Career ==
Pell was a writer for Saturday Night Live from 1995 to 2013, where she is the longest-tenured female writer in the history of the show. She created the characters Debbie Downer, the Culps, Justin Timberlake's Omeletteville mascot, and the Spartan Cheerleaders. She was also a producer and writer for the sitcom 30 Rock, and wrote the episodes "Argus" and "Floyd". In 2006, a pilot she wrote, Thick and Thin, was picked up by NBC for 13 episodes, with Pell as executive producer, but it never aired in the United States. Pell has worked with Judd Apatow providing additional writing for the films Bridesmaids and This Is 40.

As an actress, Pell appeared in several episodes of 30 Rock as the wife of Pete Hornberger and played the mother of Ron Swanson in a 2011 episode of Parks and Recreation. She has also appeared as an extra or in bit parts in dozens of SNL sketches. She voices Gadget Gal in the Hulu original series The Awesomes.

She has a small cameo in the 2013 comedy film Anchorman 2: The Legend Continues. She co-created the web series Hudson Valley Ballers with fellow SNL writer and long-time friend James Anderson with whom she also co-stars. Tina Fey produced and starred in Pell's first feature screenplay, Sisters (2015). Pell played the Dream Director and Mom's Anger in the 2015 Pixar film Inside Out. From 2016–2018, she guest-starred in the TV series Love as Erika. She played a character based on Elaine Stritch in the mockumentary musical episode "Co-op" on Documentary Now! She appeared in one episode of Unbreakable Kimmy Schmidt in 2017, season 3 episode 10. She played Helen Henry DeMarcus on the show, A.P. Bio. She also played Aunt Mo in the Showtime series SMILF.

Pell co-starred alongside several other Saturday Night Live alumnae in the 2019 Netflix original comedy Wine Country.

On August 10, 2020, the comedy-mystery Mapleworth Murders, which she also co-wrote and executive produced, aired on Quibi. Pell was nominated at the Primetime Emmy Award for Outstanding Actress in a Short Form Comedy or Drama Series for her performance. Between 2020 and 2021, Pell voiced several characters in the animated series Bless the Harts.

In 2021, she began starring as Gloria McManus in the Peacock comedy series Girls5eva.

== Personal life ==
Pell is openly gay. She was married for 17 years before getting divorced. She later married Janine Brito on November 13, 2020.

== Filmography ==
=== Film ===
Pell's film work
Year	Title	Role	Notes
2012	Lilly	Lilli	Short film
2013	Anchorman 2: The Legend Continues	Crowd Member	
2014	Birdman	Lady in Bar	
2015	Inside Out	Dream Director / Mom's Anger (voice)	
2015	Riley's First Date?	Mom's Anger (voice)	
2015	The Parker Tribe	Dot Parker	Short film
2015	Sisters	Dana	
2016	Other People	Aunt Patti	
2016	Brother Nature	Woman in Suit	
2019	Wine Country	Val	
2019	Wyrm	Tanya	
2024	Inside Out 2	Mom's Anger (voice)	
2025	Summer of 69	Betty Spaghetti	
2026	The Cat in the Hat	Patty (voice)	

=== Television ===
Pell's television work
Year	Title	Role	Notes
1991	Super Force	Mrs. BIloxi	Episode: "A Hundred Share"
1992–1993	Welcome Freshmen	Mrs. Gillman / Hillbilly Teacher	2 episodes
2002	The Colin Quinn Show	Various characters	3 episodes
2007–2013	30 Rock	Paula Hornberger	6 episodes, recurring role
2011	Funny or Die Presents	Lady Refs	3 episodes
2011	Parks and Recreation	Tamara Swanson	Episode: "Ron and Tammys"
2012	The Front Desk	Herself	Episode: "Turn Down"
2013–2015	The Awesomes	Gadget Gal (voice)	30 episodes
2013	Hudson Valley Ballers	Paula	Main role, 14 episodes
2014	Monkey Love	Ariana	Episode: "Girls Night Ou"
2015	Above Average Presents	Mom 1	2 episodes
2015	The Mindy Project	Evelyn	Episode: "Road Trip"
2015–2019	Documentary Now!	Patti Skrowaczeski / Patty	3 episodes
2017	The Catch	Carol Cooney	2 episodes
2017	Unbreakable Kimmy Schmidt	Bev	Episode: "Kimmy Pulls Off a Heist!"
2017	SMILF	Aunt Mo	Episode: "Run, Bridgette, Run or Forty-Eight Burnt Cupcakes & Graveyard Rum"
2017–2025	Big Mouth	Barbara Glouberman / various (voice)	35 episodes
2017–2018	Love	Erika	7 episodes, recurring role
2018–2021	A.P. Bio	Helen Henry Demarcus	Recurring (season 1), main role (seasons 2–4)
2019	No Activity	Daisy / Trucker (voice)	2 episodes
2020	Mapleworth Murders	Abigail Mapleworth	Main role
2020–2021	Bless the Harts	Ruth / Lenore (voice)	3 episodes
2021–2024	Girls5eva	Gloria McManus	Main role, 22 episodes
2022	Duncanville	(voice)	episode: "The Sharent Trap"
2023	Die Hart	Cynthia	4 episodes
2023	Not Dead Yet	Marlena Quintro	Episode: "Not Friends Yet"
2023	The Slumber Party	Principal Petersen	Television film
2024	Monsters at Work	Sunny (voice)	4 episodes
2024	Dream Productions	Paula Persimmon (voice)	Main role
2025	Harley Quinn	G.A.I.L. (voice)	Episode: "Family Feud"
2025	Dying for Sex	Amy	Episode: "It's Not That Serious"
2025	Loot	Paula	Episode: "What's Up with Us
2026	The 'Burbs	Dana	Main role, 8 episodes
2026	The Four Seasons	Woman 1 (cameo)	Episode: "Little Thanksgiving"

=== Producer and screenwriter ===
Paula Pell production and screenwriting work
Year	Title	Role	Notes
1995–2013	Saturday Night Live	Screenwriter / writing supervisor	311 episodes
1999	Saturday Night Live 25th Anniversary Special	Screenwriter	Television special
2002	NBC 75th Anniversary Special	Screenwriter	Television special
2002	MTV Video Music Awards	Screenwriter	Awards ceremony
2003	Saturday Night Live Weekend Update Halftime Special	Screenwriter	Television special
2004	Macy's 4th of July Spectacular	Screenwriter	Television special
2004	Saturday Night Live: The Best of Cheri Oteri	Screenwriter	Television documentary
2006	Thick and Thin	Executive producer	3 episodes, Television series
2007	Saturday Night Live in the '90s: Pop Culture Nation	Screenwriter	Television special
2008	Saturday Night Live Weekend Update Thursday	Screenwriter	3 episodes
2009–2010	30 Rock	Producer / screenwriter	22 episodes, television series
2010	The Women of SNL	Screenwriter	Television movie
2011	83rd Academy Awards	Screenwriter	Awards ceremony
2012	This Is 40	Executive producer	Film
2013–2015	Hudson Valley Ballers	Screenwriter	14 episodes, television series
2014	The Re-Gift	Screenwriter	Short film
2014	86th Academy Awards	Screenwriter	Awards ceremony
2015	Saturday Night Live 40th Anniversary Special	Screenwriter	Television special
2015	87th Academy Awards	Screenwriter	Awards ceremony
2015	Sisters	Screenwriter	Film
2017	74th Golden Globe Awards	Screenwriter	Award ceremony
2018	75th Golden Globe Awards	Screenwriter	Award ceremony
2018	Camping	Executive producer / screenwriter	3 episodes, television series
2019	A.P. Bio	Screenwriter	Episode: "Handcuffed"
2020	Sarah Cooper: Everything's Fine	Screenwriter	Television special
2020	Mapleworth Murders	Executive producer / screenwriter	12 episodes, television series

== Awards and nominations ==
Awards and nominations for Paula Pell
Award	Year	Category	Work	Result	Ref.
Annie Awards	2025	Best Voice Acting – TV/Media	Dream Productions	Won	
Hollywood Critics Association TV Awards	2021	Best Supporting Actress in a Streaming Series, Comedy	Girls5eva	Nominated	
Primetime Emmy Awards	2001	Outstanding Writing for a Variety Series	Saturday Night Live	Nominated	
Primetime Emmy Awards	2002	Outstanding Writing for a Variety Series	Saturday Night Live	Won	
Primetime Emmy Awards	2003	Outstanding Writing for a Variety Series	Saturday Night Live	Nominated	
Primetime Emmy Awards	2008	Outstanding Writing for a Variety Series	Saturday Night Live	Nominated	
Primetime Emmy Awards	2009	Outstanding Writing for a Variety Series	Saturday Night Live	Nominated	
Primetime Emmy Awards	2010	Outstanding Writing for a Variety Series	Saturday Night Live	Nominated	
Primetime Emmy Awards	2011	Outstanding Writing for a Variety Series	Saturday Night Live	Nominated	
Primetime Emmy Awards	2011	Outstanding Writing for a Variety Special	The Women of SNL	Nominated	
Primetime Emmy Awards	2012	Outstanding Writing for a Variety Series	Saturday Night Live	Nominated	
Primetime Emmy Awards	2015	Outstanding Writing for a Variety Special	Saturday Night Live 40th Anniversary Special	Nominated	
Primetime Emmy Awards	2021	Outstanding Actress in a Short Form Comedy or Drama Series	Mapleworth Murders	Nominated	
Primetime Emmy Awards	2023	Outstanding Actress in a Short Form Comedy or Drama Series	Die Hart 2: Die Harter	Nominated	
Writers Guild of America Awards	2001	Best Comedy/Variety – Talk Series	Saturday Night Live	Nominated	
Writers Guild of America Awards	2001	Best Comedy/Variety (Music, Awards, Tributes) – Specials	Saturday Night Live 25	Won	
Writers Guild of America Awards	2002	Best Comedy/Variety – Talk Series	Saturday Night Live	Nominated	
Writers Guild of America Awards	2003	Best Comedy/Variety – Talk Series	Saturday Night Live	Nominated	
Writers Guild of America Awards	2003	Best Comedy/Variety (Music, Awards, Tributes) – Specials	NBC 75th Anniversary Special	Nominated	
Writers Guild of America Awards	2007	Best Comedy/Variety – Talk Series	Saturday Night Live	Won	
Writers Guild of America Awards	2008	Best Comedy/Variety – Talk Series	Saturday Night Live	Nominated	
Writers Guild of America Awards	2009	Best Comedy/Variety – Talk Series	Saturday Night Live	Won	
Writers Guild of America Awards	2010	Best Comedy/Variety – Talk Series	Saturday Night Live	Won	
Writers Guild of America Awards	2010	Best Comedy Series	30 Rock	Won	
Writers Guild of America Awards	2011	Best Comedy Series	30 Rock	Nominated	
Writers Guild of America Awards	2011	Best Comedy/Variety – Talk Series	Saturday Night Live	Nominated	
Writers Guild of America Awards	2012	Best Comedy/Variety – Talk Series	Saturday Night Live	Nominated	
Writers Guild of America Awards	2013	Best Comedy/Variety – Talk Series	Saturday Night Live	Nominated	
Writers Guild of America Awards	2014	Best Comedy/Variety – Talk Series	Saturday Night Live	Nominated	
Writers Guild of America Awards	2015	Best Comedy/Variety – Talk Series	Saturday Night Live	Nominated	
Writers Guild of America Awards	2016	Best Comedy/Variety (Music, Awards, Tributes) – Specials	Saturday Night Live 40th Anniversary Special	Nominated	
Writers Guild of America Awards	2017	Best Comedy/Variety – Sketch Series	Saturday Night Live	Won	
