= Norman's Cay =

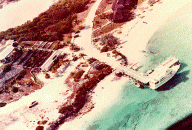
- Norman's Cay, 1981

- Location within Bahamas Location within the Caribbean
- Coordinates: 24°35′N 76°48′W
- Country: Bahamas
- Island: Exuma
- Time zone: UTC−5 (EST)
  - Summer (DST): UTC−4 (EDT)
- Area code: 242

Norman's Cay is a small Bahamian island (a few hundred hectares) in the Exumas, a chain of islands south and east of Nassau, that served as the headquarters for Carlos Lehder's drug smuggling operation from 1978 until around 1982.

== History ==
=== Drug smuggling ===
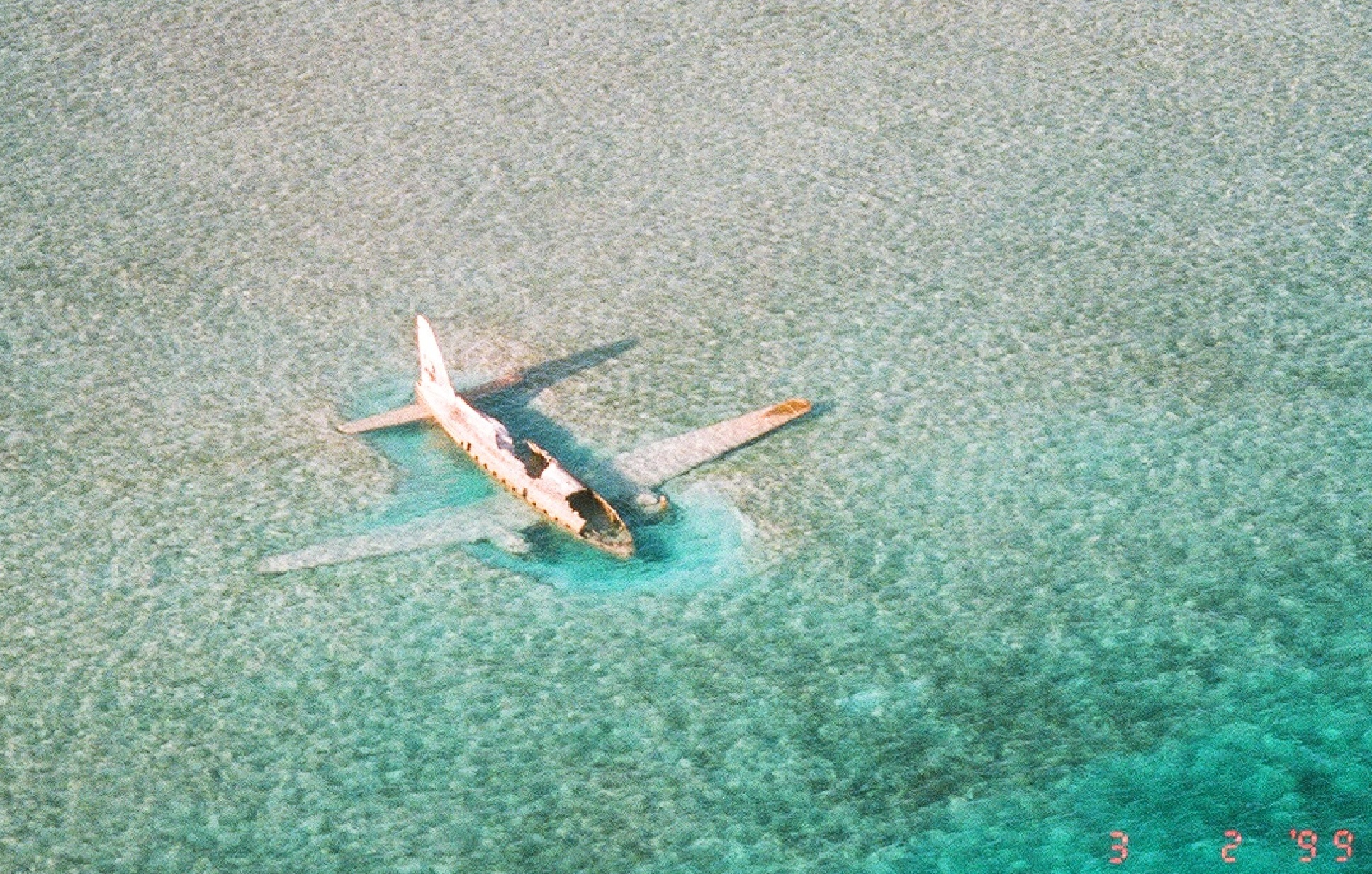
The wreckage of a Curtiss C-46 Commando that crashed in shallow water at Norman's Cay in November 1980 (1999)

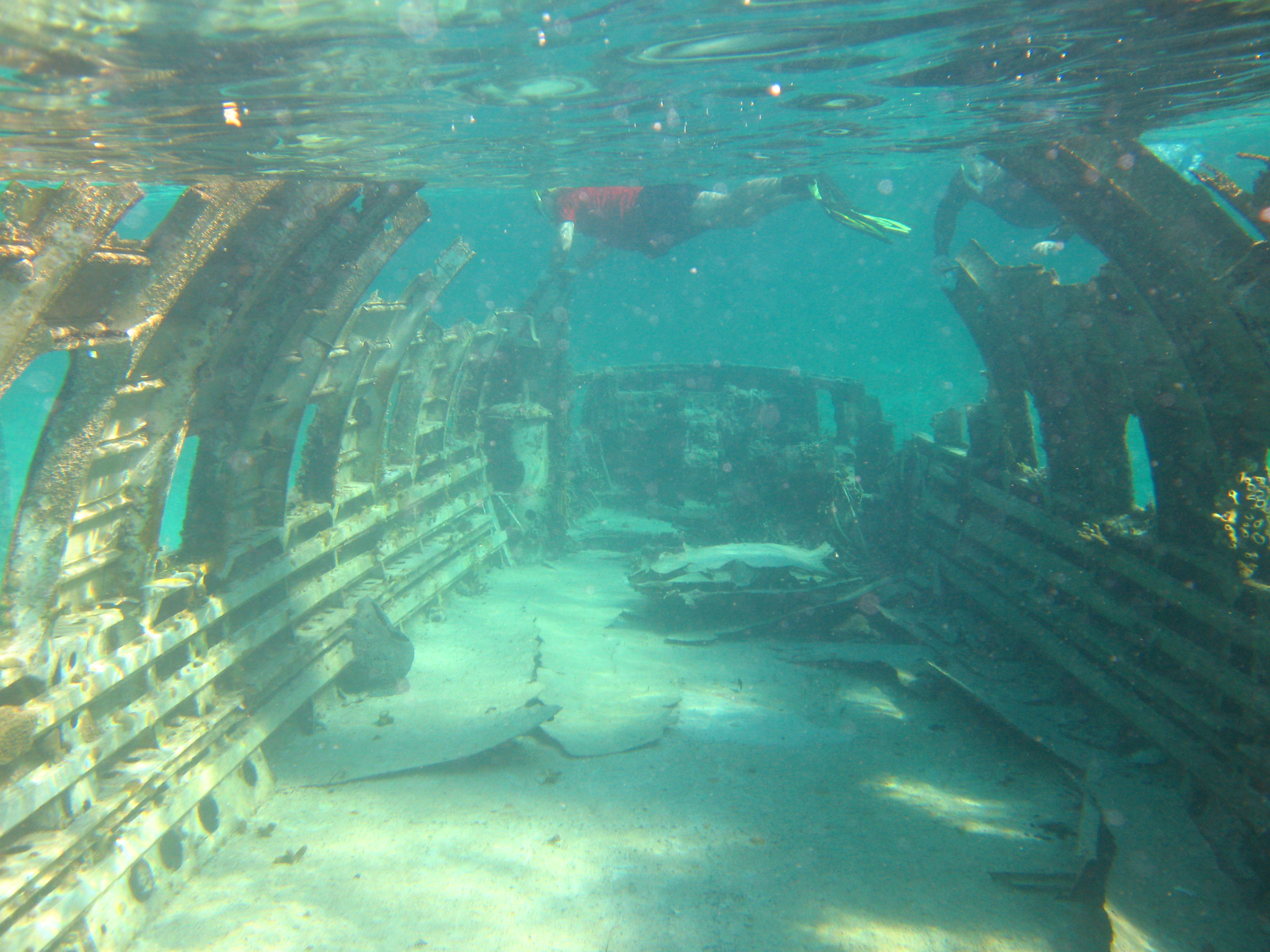
The wreckage of a Curtiss C-46 Commando that crashed in shallow water at Norman's Cay during the 1980s (2006)

As part of the Medellín Cartel, Lehder used the island as a transshipment base for smuggling cocaine into the United States. Lehder, before with his partner George Jung and later through Norman's Cay, is often credited with revolutionizing drug smuggling. The typical method of transporting small shipments, often carried by human drug mules, either through ingestion or in their luggage, onto commercial airlines, was surpassed by the use of small aircraft shipping entire loads of cocaine.

Lehder eventually extended the airstrip to a length of 1,000 metres (3,300 ft) for his fleet of aircraft. In order to protect the island, armed guards and attack dogs patrolled the beaches and runway, and radar was employed. Any pilot foolish enough to land there was quickly warned off by heavily armed guards. The island was a strategic point for Colombian drug flights to refuel and rest before proceeding to the United States.

The island became a location for partying. Carlos Toro, a friend of Lehder's who worked as a representative for the Medellín Cartel, remembered that "Norman's Cay was a playground. I have a vivid picture of being picked up in a Land Rover with the top down and naked women driving to come and welcome me from my airplane... And there we partied. And it was a Sodom and Gomorrah... drugs, sex, no police... you made the rules... and it was fun."

Marine biologist Richard E. Novak, the island's former dive master, fought back, waging a heroic but ultimately futile one-man war to liberate Norman's Cay. Not until 1982, under pressure from US law enforcement, and despite years of turning a blind eye, did the Bahamian government begin to crack down on the island's drug smuggling operations. In 1987, after Lehder was arrested in Colombia and extradited to stand trial in the U.S., his property in the Bahamas was confiscated. It is now a tourist destination reachable by charter flight.

=== Recent years ===
The island was again a subject of controversy when the newly elected Progressive Liberal government honored a pre-election in-principle agreement to sell the government-owned portion of the island, valued at $40.5 million, despite the objections of the local MP. The government believes it may encourage further foreign investment.

The island's consortium of local and foreign owners, including Bahamians Mark Holowesko, Martin Solomon, Greg Cleare, James Cole, US investor J. Steven Manolis and Jonathan Breene, had planned to include a resort chain Aman Resorts. The island has purportedly been sold to the Miami-based Fort Capital Group.

==== Fyre Festival ====
In 2017, Billy McFarland arranged to lease the island from its owners to hold the Fyre Festival, with the Cay's owners giving the strict condition that McFarland make no reference to Pablo Escobar's connection (via the Medellín Cartel). Promotional footage for the festival was shot on Norman's Cay, and planning for the festival went ahead. In early 2017, the video was released on social media, which (erroneously) advertised the island as "once owned by Pablo Escobar". The owners immediately cancelled the arrangement, and on short notice, planning was relocated to Great Exuma.

== Transportation ==
The island is served by Norman's Cay Airport. As of 2018, the airport has no commercial airline service.

== In popular culture ==
Norman's Cay has been featured in multiple works.

=== Film ===
- The biopic Blow (2001), starring Johnny Depp as George Jung.

=== Television ===
- The Hulu documentary Fyre Fraud
- The Netflix series Narcos showcased the island in the episode "The Sword of Simón Bolívar".
- The Netflix documentary Fyre
- The Netflix series Griselda

=== Literature ===
- Blow: How a Small Town Boy Made $100 Million with the Medellín Cocaine Cartel and Lost It All (1993) by George Jung and author Bruce Porter.
- Mid Ocean (2009), a novel by T. Rafael Cimino about drug smugglers and the federal agents who chase them. The novel is set in the Florida Keys in the mid 1980s and was listed as one of the top 20 novels to read before being made into a film.
- Turning The Tide: One Man Against the Medellin Cartel (2010) by Sidney D. Kirkpatrick, a true story of the college professor who brought a ruthless cocaine kingpin to justice.
- Heavy (2014), by T. Rafael Cimino and George Jung.
- Buccaneer- the Provocative Odyssey of Jack Reed- Adventurer, Drug Smuggler and Pilot Extraordinaire (2014) by Jack Carlton Reed and MayCay Beeler. ISBN 9781939521088.

=== Video games ===
- The fictional island of Cayo Perico, featured in The Cayo Perico Heist update for Grand Theft Auto Online, is based on Norman's Cay, as both are situated in the Caribbean Sea and served as a transshipment base for a drug cartel and as a private party island. However, Cayo Perico's shape more closely resembles the real-life island of Canouan, and it also features a luxurious estate similar to Pablo Escobar's Hacienda Nápoles, owned by drug lord Juan "El Rubio" Strickler.
