= VestiVille =

Canceled Belgian festival

Vestiville was a planned festival in Belgium to be held 28–30 June 2019. The scheduled artists included ASAP Rocky, Cardi B and Future (rapper). Guests arrived to find the festival had been cancelled at the last minute.

VestiVille was due to take place in Lommel, but the mayor of the city shut it down because of safety issues, including lack of fire exits, insufficient security guards and uneven ground. Attendees compared it to 2017's disastrous Fyre Festival calling it 'Fyre 2.0'. Disruption by angry fans led to the site being closed and evacuated by Belgian police.
