= Magnises =

Defunct American card-based membership company

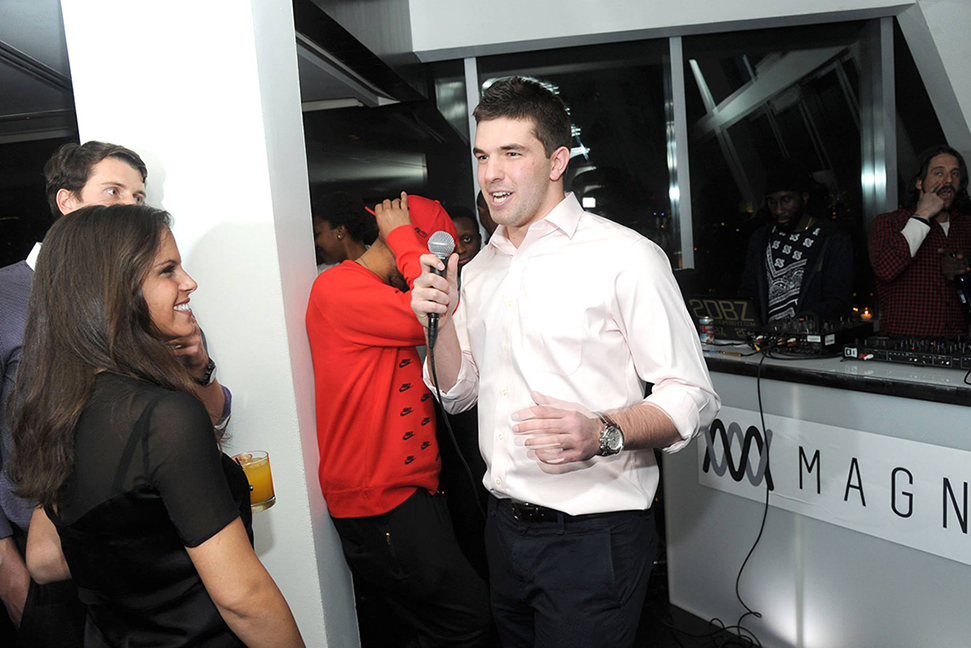
Billy McFarland at a 2014 Magnises event

Magnises was an American card-based membership club co-founded by Billy McFarland and Ja Rule in August 2013. The club card was not a bank issued credit card; members could use it only by first linking to a pre-existing bank-issued credit card.

== History ==
=== Card benefits ===
The company's namesake card, which was targeted to millennials, was widely compared to American Express's "Black Card" (officially known as the Centurion Card). Similarities between the two cards include that they were both black, made of metal, and promised exclusive perks to members. Despite appearances, however, Magnises's card was not a real charge card; instead, each card copied the magstripe information from a customer's existing Wells Fargo or Bank of America card, for which it could then be used as a substitute. By December 2013, the company had about 500 members. Benefits offered to members included VIP access to clubs, hotel discounts, and various exclusive events.

=== Business operations ===
The company was initially headquartered out of a rented townhouse in the West Village neighborhood of Manhattan, New York City, New York. The owner of this townhouse filed a lawsuit against McFarland in 2015, alleging that McFarland had "trashed" the building, accusations which he denied. The case was settled in January 2016, and the company subsequently relocated to the Chelsea neighborhood of Manhattan. By 2016, it was operating in New York City and Chicago, and, according to McFarland, its membership had grown to the tens of thousands.

=== Bankruptcy ===
After McFarland's Fyre Festival ended in a high-profile fraud case in 2017, Magnises reportedly terminated its lease on its Chelsea office, and its website ceased allowing new customers to sign up. The Daily Beast retrospectively described Magnises as a scam. In June 2018, after the Fyre Festival, McFarland was arrested again for selling fake tickets to the Coachella Festival and the Met Gala, being accused of acquiring up to $100,000 in this manner. McFarland was subsequently sentenced to six years in federal prison for various frauds in connection with the Fyre Festival.
