= Matthew Rowean =

American artist

- Born: August 6, 1982 (age 44); Boston, Massachusetts, United States
- Education: Syracuse University
- Occupations: Partner, chief creative officer at matte projects
- Years active: 2005–present
- Known for: artist, creative director, entrepreneur
- Website: matthew-rowean.com

Matthew Rowean (born August 6, 1982, in Boston, Massachusetts) is an American artist, creative director, and entrepreneur. He is a Partner and Chief Creative Officer at MATTE Projects. In 2019, Rowean was among Emmy Nominees for Fyre: The Greatest Party that Never Happened.

== Biography ==
Rowean graduated from Syracuse University with a Bachelor of Fine Arts (BFA) degree in Painting and Communication Design. In 2005, Rowean joined Strategic Group as Creative director. In 2008, he left Strategic Group and co-founded RJW (later rebranded as JWALK) alongside Doug Jacob and Charli Walk. The company worked with brands such as Lacoste, David Yurman, Equinox, and ABC. He oversaw the brand identity development of the seafood restaurant Catch, which expanded from a flagship in New York City to an international company with locations in L.A., Dubai, and Playa del Carmen.

In 2019, Rowean was among Emmy Nominees for Fyre: The Greatest Party that Never Happened.

During his tenure as Chief Creative Officer, MATTE won several Clio Awards for their campaign work with Cartier.

== Career ==
Matthew Rowean joined MATTE Projects in 2012 and helped evolve it into a creative agency and production company known for organizing high-profile events like New York City's Full Moon Music Festival and Rihanna's Met Gala after-party. The company operates in cities like New York and Mexico City, and has worked with clients such as Tom Ford, Google, and Dom Pérignon. Besides events, MATTE Projects offers content creation, digital solutions, and experiential design, working with brands such as KITH, Adidas, Amazon, Cartier, and YSL and talent such as Kanye West, James Blake and Jay-Z.

=== Music and fashion ===
In the live music sector, MATTE Projects has been involved in a variety of projects, ranging from their own live coverage of concerts to filming The Weeknd The Madness Tour. MATTE Projects was Samsung's live content partner across music for 2 years. In 2020 MATTE Projects began working directly with Kanye West across a multitude of creative projects, during this period MATTE supported aspects of the DONDA album launch, culminating with shooting the first concert to be live streamed in IMAX theaters, "Free Larry Hoover," featuring Ye and Drake.

MATTE Projects operates in the fashion industry, specializing in fashion events, live fashion show capture, campaigns, and directing fashion films for brands such as Marc Jacobs, Tom Ford, Alexander Wang, Ralph Lauren, Gucci, Puma and other brands.

=== Campaigns and events ===
In 2012, MATTE launched Full Moon, a boutique music festival at the South Street Seaport. Full Moon later moved to Governors Island and became a 10,000-person festival. In 2013, MATTE introduced "Black," a visual art and sound experience.

In November 2023, the company launched HERO – a new venue dedicated to visual and sonic storytelling at Rockefeller Center, in partnership with Colleveite and BOSE Audio. Within these walls there lives an immersive experience featuring the work of a dozen artists and designers who combine immersive video, spatial audio, and scenic design.

Roweans' collaborations within MATTE include The Macallan, KITH, Cartier, Audemars Piguet, Yves Saint Laurent Beauté, Prada, Marriott, Apple, Airbnb, and more. Their work for Cartier was recognized by Clio Awards. In 2020, MATTE was hired by Roc Nation to launch Jay-Z's cannabis brand, Monogram. In 2024 MATTE partnered with PUMA

=== Films ===
The company produced Can't Stop Won't Stop: A Bad Boy Story. The film won the Hollywood Documentary Award at the 2017 Hollywood Film Awards. In 2019, company co-produced the Emmy-nominated Netflix documentary FYRE: The Greatest Party That Never Happened and initiated "La Luna," an eco-friendly summer party. Through the pandemic, they created the documentary "Hell Of A Cruise", available Peacock, featuring the early spread of COVID-19 on cruise ships.
