= Norman's Cay Airport =

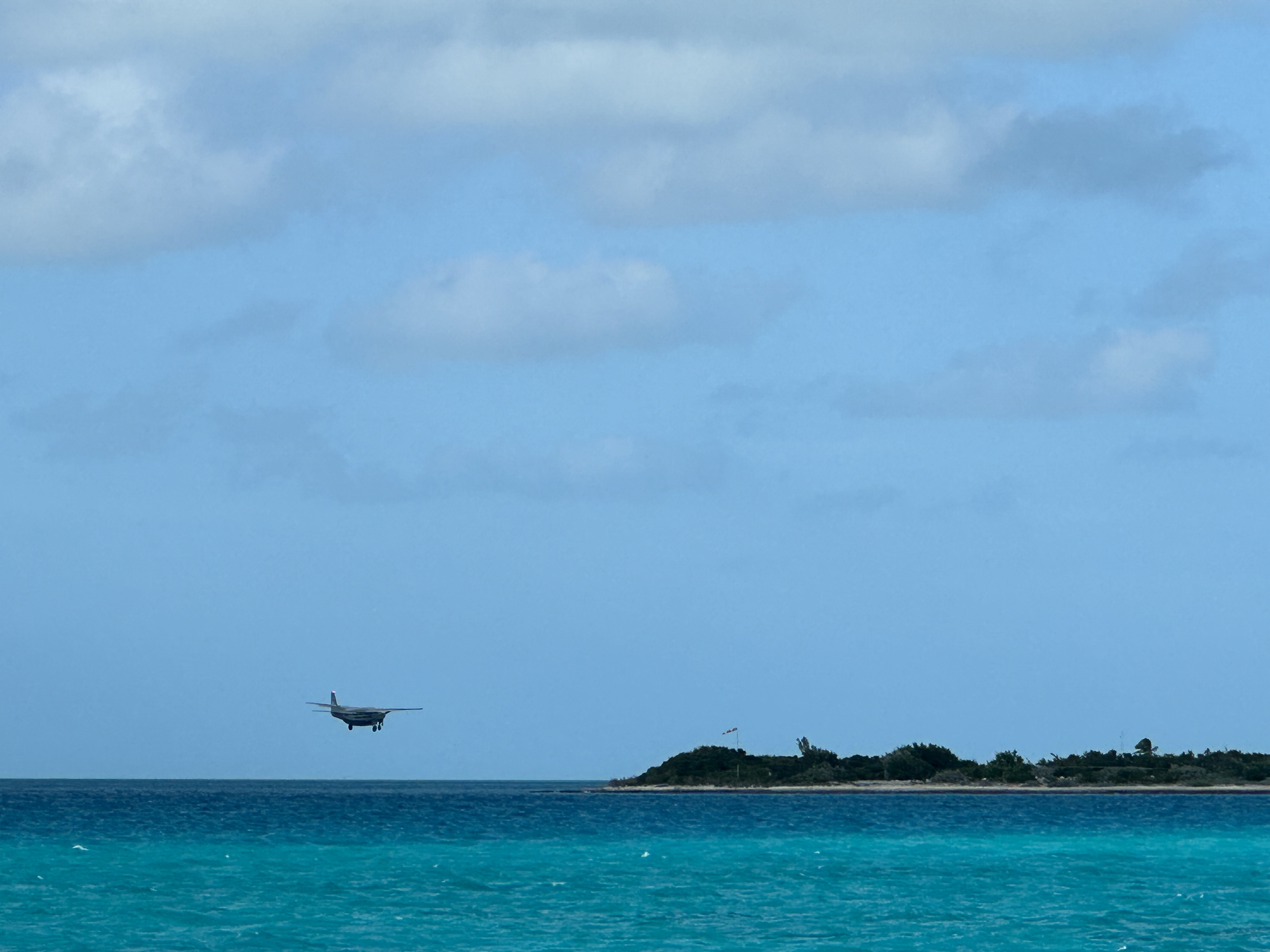
- IATA: NMC; ICAO: MYEN

Summary
- Airport type: Public
- Serves: Norman's Cay, Exuma Islands, Bahamas
- Elevation AMSL: 8 ft / 2 m
- Coordinates: 24°35′39″N 076°49′13″W

Map
- Location in The Bahamas

Runways
Direction	Length		Surface
Direction	m	ft	Surface
03/21	1,436	4,711	Asphalt
- Source: DAFIF

Norman's Cay Airport (IATA: NMC, ICAO: MYEN) is an airport serving Norman's Cay, one of the Exuma Islands in The Bahamas. It was known for cocaine drug smuggling from Colombia to the United States under Carlos Lehder.

== Facilities ==
The airport resides at an elevation of 8 ft (2.4 m) above mean sea level. It has one runway designated 03/21 with an asphalt surface measuring 1,436 m × 32 m (4,711 ft × 105 ft).

== Landing Fee ==
Though not published, there is a $162.80 (USD) or more landing fee at Norman's Cay, depending on aircraft size. The fee is communicated verbally by airport staff.
