= 71st Primetime Creative Arts Emmy Awards =

2019 American television programming awards

- Date: September 14–15, 2019
- Location: Microsoft Theater; Los Angeles, California
- Presented by: Academy of Television Arts & Sciences
- Most awards: Game of Thrones (10)
- Most nominations: Game of Thrones (18)

Television/radio coverage
- Network: FXX

The 71st Primetime Creative Arts Emmy Awards honored the best in artistic and technical achievement in American prime time television programming from June 1, 2018, until May 31, 2019, as chosen by the Academy of Television Arts & Sciences. The awards were presented across two ceremonies on September 14 and 15, 2019, at the Microsoft Theater in Los Angeles, California. FXX broadcast an abbreviated telecast of the ceremonies on September 21, leading into the 71st Primetime Emmy Awards on September 22.

== Winners and nominees ==
Winners are listed first, highlighted in boldface, and indicated with a double dagger (‡). (Note: The outlets listed for each program are the U.S. broadcasters or streaming services identified in the nominations, which for some international productions are different than the broadcaster(s) that originally commissioned the program.) Sections are based upon the categories listed in the 2018–2019 Emmy rules and procedures. Area awards and juried awards are denoted next to the category names as applicable. (Note: Area awards are non-competitive and nominees are considered on their own terms. Any nominee with at least 90% approval (or two-thirds approval for Children's Program) received an Emmy. If no nominee received 90% approval, the nominee with the highest approval received an Emmy; for area awards in picture editing and sound mixing, there was an additional requirement that the highest-rated nominee must have at least 50% approval to receive an Emmy.; Juried awards generally do not have nominations; instead, all entrants were screened before members of the appropriate peer group, and one, more than one, or no entry was awarded an Emmy based on the jury's vote.) For simplicity, producers who received nominations for program awards have been omitted.

=== Governors Award ===
- None

=== Programs ===
Programs
**Outstanding Variety Special (Live)**: **Live in Front of a Studio Audience: Norman Lear's 'All in the Family' and 'The Jeffersons' (ABC)**‡; The 76th Annual Golden Globe Awards (NBC); The 61st Grammy Awards (CBS); The Oscars (ABC); RENT (Fox); 72nd Annual Tony Awards (CBS)	**Outstanding Variety Special (Pre-Recorded)**: **Carpool Karaoke: When Corden Met McCartney Live From Liverpool (CBS)**‡; Hannah Gadsby: Nanette (Netflix); Homecoming: A Film by Beyoncé (Netflix); Springsteen on Broadway (Netflix); Wanda Sykes: Not Normal (Netflix)
**Outstanding Children's Program (Area)**: **When You Wish Upon a Pickle: A Sesame Street Special (HBO)**‡; A Series of Unfortunate Events (Netflix); Carmen Sandiego (Netflix); Song of Parkland (HBO); Star Wars Resistance (Disney Channel)	**Outstanding Animated Program**: **The Simpsons: "Mad About the Toy" (Fox)**‡; Adventure Time: "Come Along with Me" (Cartoon Network); Big Mouth: "The Planned Parenthood Show" (Netflix); Bob's Burgers: "Just One of the Boyz 4 Now for Now" (Fox); BoJack Horseman: "Free Churro" (Netflix)
**Outstanding Structured Reality Program**: **Queer Eye (Netflix)**‡; Antiques Roadshow (PBS); Diners, Drive-Ins and Dives (Food Network); Shark Tank (ABC); Tidying Up with Marie Kondo (Netflix); Who Do You Think You Are? (TLC)	**Outstanding Unstructured Reality Program**: **United Shades of America with W. Kamau Bell (CNN)**‡; Born This Way (A&E); Deadliest Catch (Discovery Channel); Life Below Zero (Nat Geo); RuPaul's Drag Race: Untucked (VH1); Somebody Feed Phil (Netflix)
**Outstanding Documentary or Nonfiction Series (Area)**: **Our Planet (Netflix)**‡; 30 for 30 (ESPN); American Masters (PBS); Chef's Table (Netflix); Hostile Planet (Nat Geo)	**Outstanding Documentary or Nonfiction Special (Area)**: **Leaving Neverland (HBO)**‡; FYRE: The Greatest Party That Never Happened (Netflix); The Inventor: Out for Blood in Silicon Valley (HBO); Jane Fonda in Five Acts (HBO); Love, Gilda (CNN); Minding the Gap (Hulu)
**Outstanding Informational Series or Special (Area)**: **Anthony Bourdain: Parts Unknown (CNN)**‡; Comedians in Cars Getting Coffee (Netflix); Leah Remini: Scientology and the Aftermath (A&E); My Next Guest Needs No Introduction with David Letterman (Netflix); Surviving R. Kelly (Lifetime)	**Exceptional Merit in Documentary Filmmaking (Juried)**: **RBG (CNN)**‡; **The Sentence (HBO)**‡; Divide and Conquer: The Story of Roger Ailes (A&E); Hale County This Morning, This Evening (PBS); Three Identical Strangers (CNN)
**Outstanding Short Form Comedy or Drama Series**: **State of the Union (Sundance TV)**‡; An Emmy for Megan (AnEmmyforMegan.com); Hack Into Broad City (Comedy Central); It's Bruno! (Netflix); Special (Netflix)	**Outstanding Short Form Variety Series**: **Carpool Karaoke: The Series (Apple Music)**‡; Billy on the Street (Funny or Die); Gay Of Thrones (Funny or Die); Honest Trailers (YouTube); The Randy Rainbow Show (YouTube)
**Outstanding Short Form Nonfiction or Reality Series**: **Creating Saturday Night Live (NBC)**‡; Fosse/Verdon (Inside Look) (FX); Pose: Identity, Family, Community (Inside Look) (FX); RuPaul's Drag Race's: Out Of The Closet (VH1); RuPaul's Drag Race's: Portrait Of A Queen (VH1)	**Outstanding Short Form Animated Program**: **Love, Death & Robots: "The Witness" (Netflix)**‡; Robot Chicken: "Why Is It Wet?" (Adult Swim); SpongeBob SquarePants: "Plankton Paranoia" (Nickelodeon); Steven Universe: "Reunited" (Cartoon Network); Teen Titans Go!: "Nostalgia Is Not a Substitute for an Actual Story" (Cartoon Network)
**Outstanding Original Interactive Program**: **NASA InSight's Mars Landing (NASA TV)**‡; First Man VR (Windows Mixed Reality); HQ Trivia x Warner Bros.: A Live and Interactive Animation First (HQ Trivia); Traveling While Black (Oculus); You vs. Wild (Netflix)	**Outstanding Interactive Program**: **NASA And SpaceX: The Interactive Demo-1 Launch (YouTube)**‡; Conan (TBS); Last Week Tonight with John Oliver (HBO); The Daily Show with Trevor Noah (Comedy Central); The Late Late Show with James Corden (CBS); The Late Show with Stephen Colbert (CBS)
**Outstanding Creative Achievement in Interactive Media within a Scripted Program**: **Bandersnatch (Black Mirror) (Netflix)**‡; Game of Thrones – Fight for the Living: Beyond the Wall Virtual Reality Experience (HBO); The Good Place – Interactive Fan Experience (NBC)	**Outstanding Creative Achievement in Interactive Media within an Unscripted Program**: **Free Solo 360 (Nat Geo)**‡; CONAN Without Borders Japan & Australia (TBS); The Late Late Show Carpool Karaoke Primetime Special 2019 (CBS); The Oscars – Digital Experience (ABC)
**Outstanding Innovation in Interactive Programming (Juried)**: **Artificial (Twitch)**‡; **Wolves in the Walls: It’s All Over (Oculus Store)**‡

=== Performing ===
Performing
**Outstanding Guest Actor in a Comedy Series**: **Luke Kirby – The Marvelous Mrs. Maisel: "All Alone" as Lenny Bruce (Prime Video)**‡; Matt Damon – Saturday Night Live: "Host: Matt Damon" as host (NBC); Robert De Niro – Saturday Night Live: "Host: Sandra Oh" as Robert Mueller (NBC); Peter MacNicol – Veep: "Oslo" as Jeff Kane (HBO); John Mulaney – Saturday Night Live: "Host: John Mulaney" as host (NBC); Adam Sandler – Saturday Night Live: "Host: Adam Sandler" as host (NBC); Rufus Sewell – The Marvelous Mrs. Maisel: "Look, She Made a Hat" as Declan Howell (Prime Video)	**Outstanding Guest Actress in a Comedy Series**: **Jane Lynch – The Marvelous Mrs. Maisel: "Vote for Kennedy, Vote for Kennedy" as Sophie Lennon (Prime Video)**‡; Sandra Oh – Saturday Night Live: "Host: Sandra Oh" as host (NBC); Maya Rudolph – The Good Place: "Chidi Sees the Time-Knife" as Judge Gen (NBC); Kristin Scott Thomas – Fleabag: "Episode 3" as Belinda (Prime Video); Fiona Shaw – Fleabag: "Episode 2" as Counsellor (Prime Video); Emma Thompson – Saturday Night Live: "Host: Emma Thompson" as host (NBC)
**Outstanding Guest Actor in a Drama Series**: **Bradley Whitford – The Handmaid's Tale: "Postpartum" as Commander Joseph Lawrence (Hulu)**‡; Michael Angarano – This Is Us: "Songbird Road: Part One" as Nick Pearson (NBC); Ron Cephas Jones – This Is Us: "A Philadelphia Story" as William (NBC); Michael McKean – Better Call Saul: "Winner" as Chuck McGill (AMC); Kumail Nanjiani – The Twilight Zone: "The Comedian" as Samir Wassan (CBS All Access); Glynn Turman – How to Get Away with Murder: "It Was the Worst Day of My Life" as Nate Lahey, Sr. (ABC)	**Outstanding Guest Actress in a Drama Series**: **Cherry Jones – The Handmaid's Tale: "Holly" as Holly (Hulu)**‡; Laverne Cox – Orange Is the New Black: "Well This Took a Dark Turn" as Sophia Burset (Netflix); Jessica Lange – American Horror Story: Apocalypse: "Return to Murder House" as Constance Langdon (FX); Phylicia Rashad – This Is Us: "Our Little Island Girl" as Carol Clarke (NBC); Cicely Tyson – How to Get Away with Murder: "Where Are Your Parents?" as Ophelia Harkness (ABC); Carice van Houten – Game of Thrones: "The Long Night" as Melisandre (HBO)
**Outstanding Actor in a Short Form Comedy or Drama Series**: **Chris O'Dowd – State of the Union as Tom (Sundance TV)**‡; Ed Begley Jr. – Ctrl Alt Delete as Dr. Rosenblatt (Vimeo); Jimmy Fallon – Beto Breaks the Internet as Beto O'Rourke (NBC); Ryan O'Connell – Special as Ryan Hayes (Netflix); Patton Oswalt – An Emmy for Megan as Patton (anemmyformegan.com)	**Outstanding Actress in a Short Form Comedy or Drama Series**: **Rosamund Pike – State of the Union as Louise (Sundance TV)**‡; Ilana Glazer – Hack Into Broad City as Ilana Wexler (Comedy Central); Jessica Hecht – Special as Mom (Netflix); Abbi Jacobson – Hack Into Broad City as Abbi Abrams (Comedy Central); Punam Patel – Special as Kim Laghari (Netflix)
**Outstanding Character Voice-Over Performance**: **Seth MacFarlane – Family Guy: "Con Heiress" as Peter Griffin, Stewie Griffin, Brian Griffin, Glenn Quagmire, Tom Tucker, and Seamus (Fox)**‡; Hank Azaria – The Simpsons: "From Russia Without Love" as Moe, Carl, Duffman, and Kirk (Fox); Alex Borstein – Family Guy: "Throw It Away" as Lois Griffin and Tricia Takanawa (Fox); Eric Jacobson – When You Wish Upon a Pickle: A Sesame Street Special as Bert, Grover, and Oscar (HBO); Kevin Michael Richardson – F Is for Family: "The Stinger" as Rosie (Netflix)	**Outstanding Narrator**: **Sir David Attenborough – Our Planet (Netflix)**‡; Angela Bassett – The Flood (Nat Geo Wild); Charles Dance – Savage Kingdom (Nat Geo Wild); Anthony Mendez – Wonders of Mexico (PBS); Liev Schreiber – The Many Lives of Nick Buoniconti (HBO); Juliet Stevenson – Queens of Mystery (Acorn TV)
**Outstanding Host for a Reality or Competition Program**: **RuPaul – RuPaul's Drag Race (VH1)**‡; James Corden – The World's Best (CBS); Ellen DeGeneres – Ellen's Game of Games (NBC); Marie Kondo – Tidying Up with Marie Kondo (Netflix); Amy Poehler and Nick Offerman – Making It (NBC)

=== Animation ===
Animation
**Outstanding Individual Achievement in Animation (Juried)**
- **Age of Sail – Céline Desrumaux (YouTube)**‡
- **Age of Sail – Bruno Mangyoku (YouTube)**‡
- **Age of Sail – Jasmin Lai (YouTube)**‡
- **Carmen Sandiego: "The Chasing Paper Caper" – Elaine Lee (Netflix)**‡
- **Love, Death & Robots: "Good Hunting" – Jun-ho Kim (Netflix)**‡
- **Love, Death & Robots: "Sucker of Souls" – Owen Sullivan (Netflix)**‡
- **Love, Death & Robots: "The Witness" – Alberto Mielgo (Netflix)**‡
- **Love, Death & Robots: "The Witness" – David Pate (Netflix)**‡

=== Art Direction ===
Art Direction
**Outstanding Production Design for a Narrative Contemporary Program (One Hour or More) (Area)**: **The Handmaid's Tale: "Holly" (Hulu)**‡; Escape at Dannemora (Showtime); Killing Eve: "The Hungry Caterpillar" (BBC America); Ozark: "Outer Darkness, The Gold Coast" (Netflix); The Umbrella Academy: "We Only See Each Other at Weddings and Funerals" (Netflix)	**Outstanding Production Design for a Narrative Period or Fantasy Program (One Hour or More) (Area)**: **Chernobyl (HBO)**‡; A Series of Unfortunate Events: "Penultimate Peril: Part 1" (Netflix); Fosse/Verdon (FX); Game of Thrones: "The Bells" (HBO); The Man in the High Castle: "Now More Than Ever, We Care About You" (Prime Video); The Marvelous Mrs. Maisel: "Simone" / "We're Going to the Catskills!" (Prime Video)
**Outstanding Production Design for a Narrative Program (Half-Hour or Less) (Area)**: **Russian Doll: "Nothing in the World Is Easy" (Netflix)**‡; Barry: "ronny/lily" (HBO); Veep: "Veep" (HBO); Will & Grace: "Jack's Big Gay Wedding" (NBC)	**Outstanding Production Design for a Variety, Reality or Competition Series (Area)**: **Saturday Night Live: "Host: John Mulaney" / "Host: Emma Stone" (NBC)**‡; At Home with Amy Sedaris: "Teenagers" (truTV); Last Week Tonight with John Oliver: "Authoritarianism" (HBO); Queer Eye: "Jones Bar-B-Q" (Netflix); The Voice: "Live Cross Battles Part 1" (NBC)
**Outstanding Production Design for a Variety Special (Area)**: **RENT (Fox)**‡; The 61st Grammy Awards (CBS); Homecoming: A Film by Beyoncé (Netflix); Live in Front of a Studio Audience: Norman Lear's All in the Family and The Jeffersons (ABC); The Oscars (ABC)

=== Casting ===
Casting
**Outstanding Casting for a Comedy Series**: **Fleabag - Olivia Scott-Webb (Prime Video)**‡; Barry - Sharon Bialy and Sherry Thomas (HBO); The Marvelous Mrs. Maisel - Cindy Tolan (Prime Video); Russian Doll - Christine Kromer (Netflix); Veep - Dorian Frankel and Sibby Kirchgessner (HBO)	**Outstanding Casting for a Drama Series**: **Game of Thrones - Nina Gold, Robert Sterne and Carla Stronge (HBO)**‡; Killing Eve - Suzanne Crowley and Gilly Poole (BBC America); Ozark - Alexa L. Fogel, Tara Feldstein Bennett and Chase Paris (Netflix); Pose - Alexa L. Fogel (FX); Succession - Francine Maisler, Douglas Aibel and Henry Russell Bergstein (HBO)
**Outstanding Casting for a Limited Series, Movie, or Special**: **When They See Us - Aisha Coley, Billy Hopkins and Ashley Ingram (Netflix)**‡; Chernobyl - Nina Gold and Robert Sterne (HBO); Escape at Dannemora - Rachel Tenner (Showtime); Fosse/Verdon - Bernard Telsey and Tiffany Little Canfield (FX); Sharp Objects - David Rubin (HBO)	**Outstanding Casting for a Reality Program**: **Queer Eye - Gretchen Palek, Danielle Gervais, Quinn Fegan, Ally Capriotti Grant and Pamela Vallarelli (Netflix)**‡; Born This Way - Sasha Alpert, Megan Sleeper and Caitlyn Audet (A&E); RuPaul's Drag Race - Goloka Bolte and Ethan Petersen (VH1); Shark Tank - Mindy Zemrak and Jen Rosen (ABC); The Voice - Michelle McNulty, Holly Dale and Courtney Burns (NBC)

=== Choreography ===
Choreography
**Outstanding Choreography for Variety and Reality Programming (Juried)**: **World of Dance – Tessandra Chavez (NBC)**‡; So You Think You Can Dance – Luther Brown (Fox); So You Think You Can Dance – Travis Wall (Fox); World of Dance – Karen Forcano and Ricardo Vega (NBC); World of Dance – Suresh Mukund (NBC); World of Dance – Melvin "Timtim" Rogador (NBC)	**Outstanding Choreography for Scripted Programming (Juried)**: **Crazy Ex-Girlfriend: "Don't Be a Lawyer" / "Antidepressants Are So Not a Big Deal" – Kathryn Burns (The CW)**‡

=== Cinematography ===
Cinematography
**Outstanding Cinematography for a Multi-Camera Series**: **The Ranch: "Reckless" – Donald A. Morgan (Netflix)**‡; Rel: "Halloween" – George Mooradian (Fox); Will & Grace: "Family, Trip" – Gary Baum (NBC)	**Outstanding Cinematography for a Single-Camera Series (Half-Hour)**: **Russian Doll: "Ariadne" – Chris Teague (Netflix)**‡; Ballers: "Rough Ride" – Anthony Hardwick (HBO); Fleabag: "Episode 1" – Tony Miller (Prime Video); Homecoming: "Optics" – Tod Campbell (Prime Video); Insecure: "High-Like" – Ava Berkofsky (HBO); What We Do in the Shadows: "Manhattan Night Club" – D.J. Stipsen (FX)
**Outstanding Cinematography for a Limited Series or Movie**: **Chernobyl: "Please Remain Calm" – Jakob Ihre (HBO)**‡; Deadwood: The Movie – Dave Klein (HBO); True Detective: "The Great War and Modern Memory" – Germain McMicking (HBO); When They See Us: "Part One" – Bradford Young (Netflix)	**Outstanding Cinematography for a Single-Camera Series (One Hour)**: **The Marvelous Mrs. Maisel: "Simone" – M. David Mullen (Prime Video)**‡; Game of Thrones: "The Iron Throne" – Jonathan Freeman (HBO); The Handmaid's Tale: "Holly" – Zoë White (Hulu); The Handmaid's Tale: "The Word" – Colin Watkinson (Hulu); Hanna: "Forest" – Dana Gonzales (Prime Video); The Man in the High Castle: "Jahr Null" – Gonzalo Amat (Prime Video); Ray Donovan: "Staten Island: Part 1" – Robert McLachlan (Showtime)
**Outstanding Cinematography for a Reality Program**: **Life Below Zero (Nat Geo)**‡; Deadliest Catch (Discovery Channel); Queer Eye: "God Bless Gay" (Netflix); RuPaul's Drag Race: "Trump: The Rusical" (VH1); Survivor (CBS)	**Outstanding Cinematography for Nonfiction Programming**: **Free Solo – Jimmy Chin, Clair Popkin, and Mikey Schaefer (Nat Geo)**‡; Anthony Bourdain: Parts Unknown: "Bhutan" – Morgan Fallon, Todd Liebler, and Zach Zamboni (CNN); Our Planet: "Coastal Seas" – Doug Anderson and Gavin Thurston (Netflix); Our Planet: "Jungles" – Alastair MacEwen and Matt Aeberhard (Netflix); Our Planet: "One Planet" – Jamie McPherson and Roger Horrocks (Netflix)

=== Commercial ===
Commercial
**Outstanding Commercial**
- **"Dream Crazy" (Nike)**‡
  - "Behind the Mac – Make Something Wonderful" (MacBook)
  - "A Great Day in Hollywood" (Netflix)
  - "Point of View" (Sandy Hook Promise)
  - "Shot on iPhone XS – Don't Mess with Mother" (iPhone)

=== Costumes ===
Costumes
**Outstanding Period Costumes (Area)**: **The Marvelous Mrs. Maisel: "We're Going to the Catskills!" (Prime Video)**‡; Chernobyl: "Please Remain Calm" (HBO); Fosse/Verdon: "Life Is a Cabaret" (FX); GLOW: "Every Potato Has a Receipt" (Netflix); Pose: "Pilot" (FX)	**Outstanding Fantasy/Sci-Fi Costumes (Area)**: **Game of Thrones: "The Bells" (HBO)**‡; American Horror Story: Apocalypse: "Forbidden Fruit" (FX); Good Omens: "Hard Times" (Prime Video); The Handmaid's Tale: "The Word" (Hulu); A Series of Unfortunate Events: "Penultimate Peril: Part 2" (Netflix)
**Outstanding Contemporary Costumes (Area)**: **Russian Doll: "Superiority Complex" (Netflix)**‡; Black-ish: "Purple Rain" (ABC); Escape at Dannemora: "Episode 6" (Showtime); Grace and Frankie: "The Wedding" (Netflix); Schitt's Creek: "The Dress" (Pop TV); Sharp Objects (Episode: "Closer") (HBO)	**Outstanding Costumes for a Variety, Nonfiction, or Reality Programming (Area)**: **RuPaul's Drag Race: "Trump: The Rusical" (VH1)**‡; Dancing with the Stars: "The Premiere" (ABC); Homecoming: A Film by Beyoncé (Netflix); The Masked Singer: "Finale" (Fox); Saturday Night Live: "Host: Sandra Oh" (NBC)

=== Directing ===
Directing
**Outstanding Directing for a Documentary/Nonfiction Program**: **Free Solo – Elizabeth Chai Vasarhelyi and Jimmy Chin (Nat Geo)**‡; FYRE: The Greatest Party That Never Happened – Chris Smith (Netflix); Leaving Neverland – Dan Reed (HBO); RBG – Julie Cohen and Betsy West (CNN); Three Identical Strangers – Tim Wardle (CNN)	**Outstanding Directing for a Variety Special**: **Springsteen on Broadway – Thom Zimny (Netflix)**‡; Carpool Karaoke: When Corden Met McCartney Live From Liverpool – Ben Winston (CBS); Homecoming: A Film by Beyoncé – Beyoncé Knowles-Carter and Ed Burke (Netflix); Live in Front of a Studio Audience: Norman Lear's All in the Family and The Jeffersons – James Burrows and Andy Fisher (ABC); The Oscars – Glenn Weiss (ABC)
**Outstanding Directing for a Reality Program**: **Queer Eye: "Black Girl Magic" – Hisham Abed (Netflix)**‡; The Amazing Race: "Who Wants A Rolex?" – Bertram van Munster (CBS); American Ninja Warrior: "Minneapolis City Qualifiers" – Patrick McManus (NBC); RuPaul's Drag Race: "Whatcha Unpackin?" – Nick Murray (VH1); Shark Tank: "Episode 1002" – Ken Fuchs (ABC)

=== Hairstyling ===
Hairstyling
**Outstanding Hairstyling for a Single-Camera Series**: **The Marvelous Mrs. Maisel: "We're Going to the Catskills!" (Prime Video)**‡; American Horror Story: Apocalypse: "Forbidden Fruit" (FX); Game of Thrones: "The Long Night" (HBO); GLOW: "The Good Twin" (Netflix); Pose: "Pilot" (FX)	**Outstanding Hairstyling for a Multi-Camera Series or Special**: **RuPaul's Drag Race: "Trump: The Rusical" (VH1)**‡; Dancing with the Stars: "Halloween Night" (ABC); Saturday Night Live: "Host: Adam Sandler" (NBC); The Voice: "Live Top 13 Performances" (NBC); World of Dance: "Episode 306" (NBC)
**Outstanding Hairstyling for a Limited Series or Movie**: **Fosse/Verdon (FX)**‡; Chernobyl (HBO); Deadwood: The Movie (HBO); Sharp Objects: "Closer" (HBO); True Detective (HBO)

=== Lighting Design / Direction ===
Lighting Design / Direction
**Outstanding Lighting Design / Lighting Direction for a Variety Series**: **Saturday Night Live: "Host: John Mulaney" (NBC)**‡; America's Got Talent: "Semi Final #1 Performance Show" (NBC); Dancing with the Stars: "Semi-Finals" (ABC); So You Think You Can Dance: "Finale" (Fox); The Voice: "Live Finale, Part 1" (NBC)	**Outstanding Lighting Design / Lighting Direction for a Variety Special**: **RENT (Fox)**‡; The 61st Grammy Awards (CBS); Kennedy Center Honors (CBS); The Oscars (ABC); 72nd Annual Tony Awards (CBS)

=== Main Title and Motion Design ===
Main Title and Motion Design
**Outstanding Main Title Design**: **Game of Thrones (HBO)**‡; Conversations with a Killer: The Ted Bundy Tapes (Netflix); Star Trek: Discovery (CBS All Access); True Detective (HBO); Warrior (Cinemax)	**Outstanding Motion Design (Juried)**: **Patriot Act with Hasan Minhaj – Michelle Higa Fox, Jorge L. Peschiera, Yussef Cole, Brandon Sugiyama, and Paris London Glickman (Netflix)**‡

=== Make-up ===
Make-up
**Outstanding Make-up for a Single-Camera Series (Non-Prosthetic)**: **Game of Thrones: "The Long Night" (HBO)**‡; American Horror Story: Apocalypse: "Forbidden Fruit" (FX); GLOW: "The Good Twin" (Netflix); The Marvelous Mrs. Maisel: "We're Going to the Catskills!" (Prime Video); Pose: "Pilot" (FX)	**Outstanding Make-up for a Multi-Camera Series or Special (Non-Prosthetic)**: **Saturday Night Live: "Host: Adam Sandler" (NBC)**‡; Dancing with the Stars: "Halloween Night" (ABC); RENT (Fox); RuPaul's Drag Race: "Trump: The Rusical" (VH1); So You Think You Can Dance: "Finale" (Fox); The Voice: "Live Top 13 Performances" (NBC)
**Outstanding Make-up for a Limited Series or Movie (Non-Prosthetic)**: **Fosse/Verdon (FX)**‡; Chernobyl (HBO); Deadwood: The Movie (HBO); Sharp Objects (HBO); True Detective (HBO)	**Outstanding Prosthetic Makeup for a Series, Limited Series, Movie or Special (Area)**: **Star Trek: Discovery: "If Memory Serves" (CBS All Access)**‡; American Horror Story: Apocalypse: "Apocalypse Then" (FX); Chernobyl (HBO); Fosse/Verdon (FX); Game of Thrones: "The Long Night" (HBO)

=== Music ===
Music
**Outstanding Music Composition for a Series (Original Dramatic Score)**: **Game of Thrones: "The Long Night" – Ramin Djawadi (HBO)**‡; Barry: "What?!" – David Wingo (HBO); The Handmaid's Tale: "The Word" – Adam Taylor (Hulu); House of Cards: "Chapter 73" – Jeff Beal (Netflix); This Is Us: "Songbird Road: Part One" – Siddhartha Khosla (NBC)	**Outstanding Music Composition for a Limited Series, Movie, or Special (Original Dramatic Score)**: **Chernobyl: "Please Remain Calm" – Hildur Guðnadóttir (HBO)**‡; Escape at Dannemora: "Episode 5" – Edward Shearmur (Showtime); Good Omens: "In the Beginning" – David Arnold (Prime Video); True Detective: "The Final Country" – Keefus Ciancia and T Bone Burnett (HBO); When They See Us: "Part Two" – Kris Bowers (Netflix)
**Outstanding Music Composition for a Documentary Series or Special (Original Dramatic Score)**: **Free Solo – Brandon Roberts and Marco Beltrami (Nat Geo)**‡; Game of Thrones: The Last Watch – Hannah Peel (HBO); Hostile Planet: "Oceans" – Benjamin Wallfisch (Nat Geo); Love, Gilda – Miriam Cutler (CNN); Our Planet: "One Planet" – Steven Price (Netflix); RBG – Miriam Cutler (CNN)	**Outstanding Music Direction**: **Fosse/Verdon: "Life Is a Cabaret" – Alex Lacamoire (FX)**‡; Aretha! A Grammy Celebration for the Queen of Soul – Rickey Minor (CBS); Homecoming: A Film by Beyoncé – Beyoncé Knowles-Carter and Derek Dixie (Netflix); The Oscars – Rickey Minor (ABC); Q85: A Musical Celebration for Quincy Jones: "Part 1" – Greg Phillinganes (BET); Saturday Night Live: "Host: Adam Sandler" – Lenny Pickett, Leon Pendarvis, and Eli Brueggemann (NBC)
**Outstanding Original Main Title Theme Music**: **Succession – Nicholas Britell (HBO)**‡; Castle Rock – Thomas Newman (Hulu); Crazy Ex-Girlfriend – Rachel Bloom, Jack Dolgen, and Adam Schlesinger (The CW); Good Omens – David Arnold (Prime Video); Our Planet – Steven Price (Netflix)	**Outstanding Original Music and Lyrics**: **Crazy Ex-Girlfriend: "I Have to Get Out" – "Antidepressants Are So Not a Big Deal" (The CW)**‡; 72nd Tony Awards – "This One's for You" (CBS); Documentary Now!: "Original Cast Album: Co-op" – "Holiday Party (I Did a Little Cocaine Tonight") (IFC); Flight of the Conchords: Live In London – "Father & Son" (HBO); Saturday Night Live: "Host: James McAvoy" – "The Upper East Side" (NBC); Song of Parkland – "Beautiful Things Can Grow" (HBO)
**Outstanding Music Supervision**: **The Marvelous Mrs. Maisel: "We're Going to the Catskills!" – Robin Urdang, Amy Sherman-Palladino and Daniel Palladino (Prime Video)**‡; Better Call Saul: "Something Stupid" – Thomas Golubić (AMC); Fosse/Verdon: "Life Is a Cabaret" – Steven Gizicki (FX); Quincy – Jasper Leak (Netflix); Russian Doll: "Nothing in This World Is Easy" – Brienne Rose (Netflix)

=== Picture Editing ===
Picture Editing
**Outstanding Single-Camera Picture Editing for a Drama Series**: **Game of Thrones: "The Long Night" – Tim Porter (HBO)**‡; Game of Thrones: "The Iron Throne" – Katie Weiland (HBO); Game of Thrones: "Winterfell" – Crispin Green (HBO); The Handmaid's Tale: "The Word" – Wendy Hallam Martin (Hulu); Killing Eve: "Desperate Times" – Dan Crinnion (BBC America); Ozark: "One Way Out" – Cindy Mollo and Heather Goodwin Floyd (Netflix)	**Outstanding Single-Camera Picture Editing for a Comedy Series**: **Fleabag: "Episode 1" – Gary Dollner (Prime Video)**‡; Barry: "berkman > block" – Kyle Reiter (HBO); Barry: "ronny/lily" – Jeff Buchanan (HBO); The Marvelous Mrs. Maisel: "Simone" – Kate Sanford (Prime Video); The Marvelous Mrs. Maisel: "We're Going to the Catskills!" – Tim Streeto (Prime Video); Russian Doll: "Ariadne" – Laura Weinberg (Netflix)
**Outstanding Single-Camera Picture Editing for a Limited Series or Movie**: **Chernobyl: "Please Remain Calm" – Simon Smith (HBO)**‡; Chernobyl: "Open Wide, O Earth" – Jinx Godfrey (HBO); Deadwood: The Movie – Martin Nicholson and Erick Fefferman (HBO); Fosse/Verdon: "Life Is a Cabaret" – Tim Streeto (FX); Sharp Objects: "Fix" – Véronique Barbe, Justin Lachance, Maxime Lahaie, Émile Vallée, and Jai M. Vee (HBO); True Detective: "If You Have Ghosts" – Leo Trombetta (HBO)	**Outstanding Multi-Camera Picture Editing for a Comedy Series**: **One Day at a Time: "The Funeral" – Pat Barnett (Netflix)**‡; The Big Bang Theory: "The Stockholm Syndrome" – Peter Chakos (CBS); The Conners: "Keep On Truckin'" – Brian Schnuckel (ABC); Mom: "Big Floor Pillows and a Ball of Fire" – Joe Bella (CBS); Will & Grace: "Family, Trip" – Peter Beyt (NBC)
**Outstanding Picture Editing for Variety Programming (Area)**: **Last Week Tonight with John Oliver: "The Wax & the Furious" – Ryan Barger (HBO)**‡; Carpool Karaoke: When Corden Met McCartney Live From Liverpool – Tom Jarvis (CBS); Drunk History: "Are You Afraid of the Drunk?" – John Cason (Comedy Central); Last Week Tonight with John Oliver: "The Journey Of ChiiJohn" – Anthony Miale (HBO); Who Is America?: "Episode 102" – Vera Drew, Eric Notarnicola, Roger Nygard, Matt Davis and Jeremy Cohen (Showtime)	**Outstanding Picture Editing for Nonfiction Programming**: **Free Solo – Bob Eisenhardt (Nat Geo)**‡; Anthony Bourdain: Parts Unknown: "Lower East Side" – Tom Patterson (CNN); Leaving Neverland – Jules Cornell (HBO); RBG – Carla Gutierrez (CNN); Three Identical Strangers – Michael Harte (CNN)
**Outstanding Picture Editing for a Structured Reality or Competition Program**: **Queer Eye – Joseph Deshano, Matthew Miller, Ryan Taylor, Carlos Gamarra, Iain Tibbles, and Tony Zajkowski (Netflix)**‡; The Amazing Race: "Who Wants a Rolex?" – Kellen Cruden, Christina Fontana, Jay Gammill, Katherine Griffin, Josh Lowry, Steve Mellon, and Jason Pedroza (CBS); RuPaul's Drag Race – Jamie Martin, Michael Lynn Deis, Julie Tseselsky Kirschner, John Lim, Ryan Mallick, Michael Roha, and Corey Ziemniak (VH1); RuPaul's Drag Race All Stars: "Jersey Justice" – Molly Shock, Eileen Finkelstein, Michael Lynn Deis, Myron Santos, Steve Brown, Ray Van Ness, and Michael Hellwig (VH1); Survivor: "Appearances Are Deceiving" – Fred Hawthorne, Andrew Bolhuis, Joubin Mortazavi, Plowden Schumacher, David Armstrong, Evan Mediuch, and Jacob Teixeira (CBS)	**Outstanding Picture Editing for an Unstructured Reality Program**: **United Shades of America with W. Kamau Bell: "Hmong Americans and the Secret War" – Alessandro Soares (CNN)**‡; Born This Way – Jarrod Burt, Jacob Lane, Annie Ray, Steve Miloszewski, Malinda Guerra, David Henry, Stephanie Lyra, Dana Martell, David McIntosh, Svein Mikkelsen, Patrick Post, Ryan Rambach, Peggy Tachdjian, Lisa Trulli, Kjer Westbye, and Dan Zimmerman (A&E); Deadliest Catch: "Battle of Kings" – Rob Butler, Isaiah Camp, Nathen Araiza, Ben Bulatao and Greg Cornejo (Discovery Channel); Life Below Zero: "Cost of Winter" – Tony Diaz, Matt Mercer, Jennifer Nelson, Eric Michael Schrader and Michael Swingler (Nat Geo); RuPaul's Drag Race: Untucked – Kendra Pasker, Shayna Casey, and Stavros Stavropoulos (VH1)

=== Sound Editing ===
Sound Editing
**Outstanding Sound Editing for a Comedy or Drama Series (One-Hour)**: **Game of Thrones: "The Long Night" (HBO)**‡; Better Call Saul: "Talk" (AMC); Gotham: "Legend of the Dark Knight: I Am Bane" (Fox); Star Trek: Discovery: "Such Sweet Sorrow, Part 2" (CBS); Tom Clancy's Jack Ryan: "Pilot" (Prime Video)	**Outstanding Sound Editing for a Comedy or Drama Series (Half-Hour) and Animation**: **Barry: "ronny/lily" (HBO)**‡; Ballers: "This Is Not Our World" (HBO); Love, Death & Robots: "The Secret War" (Netflix); Russian Doll: "The Way Out" (Netflix); What We Do in the Shadows: "Werewolf Feud" (FX)
**Outstanding Sound Editing for a Limited Series, Movie, or Special**: **Chernobyl: "1:23:45" (HBO)**‡; Catch-22: "Episode 1" (Hulu); Deadwood: The Movie (HBO); True Detective: "The Great War and Modern Memory" (HBO); When They See Us: "Part Four" (Netflix)	**Outstanding Sound Editing for Nonfiction Programming (Single or Multi-Camera)**: **Free Solo (Nat Geo)**‡; Anthony Bourdain: Parts Unknown: "Far West Texas" (CNN); FYRE: The Greatest Party That Never Happened (Netflix); Leaving Neverland (HBO); Our Planet: "Frozen Worlds" (Netflix)

=== Sound Mixing ===
Sound Mixing
**Outstanding Sound Mixing for a Comedy or Drama Series (One Hour)**: **Game of Thrones: "The Long Night" (HBO)**‡; Better Call Saul: "Talk" (AMC); The Handmaid's Tale: "Holly" (Hulu); The Marvelous Mrs. Maisel: "Vote for Kennedy, Vote for Kennedy" (Prime Video); Ozark: "The Badger" (Netflix)	**Outstanding Sound Mixing for a Limited Series or Movie**: **Chernobyl: "1:23:45" (HBO)**‡; Deadwood: The Movie (HBO); Fosse/Verdon: "All I Care About Is Love" (FX); True Detective: "The Great War and Modern Memory" (HBO); When They See Us: "Part Four" (Netflix)
**Outstanding Sound Mixing for a Comedy or Drama Series (Half-Hour) and Animation (Area)**: **Barry: "ronny/lily" (HBO)**‡; The Kominsky Method: "Chapter 1: An Actor Avoids" (Netflix); Modern Family: "A Year of Birthdays" (ABC); Russian Doll: "The Way Out" (Netflix); Veep: "Veep" (HBO)	**Outstanding Sound Mixing for a Variety Series or Special (Area)**: **Aretha! A Grammy Celebration for the Queen of Soul (CBS)**‡; Carpool Karaoke: When Corden Met McCartney Live from Liverpool (CBS); The 61st Grammy Awards (CBS); Last Week Tonight with John Oliver: "Authoritarianism" (HBO); The Oscars (ABC)
**Outstanding Sound Mixing for Nonfiction Program (Single or Multi-Camera) (Area)**: **Free Solo (Nat Geo)**‡; Anthony Bourdain: Parts Unknown: "Kenya" (CNN); FYRE: The Greatest Party That Never Happened (Netflix); Leaving Neverland (HBO); Our Planet: "Frozen Worlds" (Netflix)

=== Special Visual Effects ===
Special Visual Effects
**Outstanding Special Visual Effects**: **Game of Thrones: "The Bells" – Joe Bauer, Steve Kullback, Adam Chazen, Sam Conway, Mohsen Mousavi, Martin Hill, Ted Rae, Patrick Tiberius Gehlen, and Thomas Schelesny (HBO)**‡; The Man in the High Castle: "Jahr Null" – Lawson Deming, Cory Jamieson, Casi Blume, Nick Chamberlain, Bill Parker, Saber Jlassi, Chris Parks, Brian Hobert, and Danielle Malambri (Prime Video); The Orville: "Identity Part II" – Luke McDonald, Tommy Tran, Kevin Lingenfelser, Nhat Phong Tran, Brooke Noska, Melissa Delong, Brandon Fayette, Matt Von Brock, and Joseph Vincent Pike (Fox); Star Trek: Discovery: "Such Sweet Sorrow, Part 2" – Jason Michael Zimmerman, Ante Dekovic, Ivan Kondrup Jensen, Mahmoud Rahnama, Alexander Wood, Aleksandra Kochoska, Charles Collyer, Fausto Tejeda, and Darcy Callaghan (CBS All Access); The Umbrella Academy: "The White Violin" – Everett Burrell, R. Christopher White, Jeff Campbell, Sebastien Bergeron, Sean Schur, Steve Dellerson, Libby Hazell, Carrie Richardson, and Misato Shinohara (Netflix)	**Outstanding Special Visual Effects in a Supporting Role**: **Chernobyl: "1:23:45" – Lindsay McFarlane, Max Dennison, Claudius Christian Rauch, Clare Cheetham, Laura Bethencourt Montes, Steven Godfrey, Luke Letkey, Christian Waite, and William Foulser (HBO)**‡; Catch-22: "Episode 4" – Matt Kasmir, Brian Connor, Dan Charbit, Matthew Wheelon Hunt, Alun Cummings, Gavin Harrison, Giovanni Casadei, Remi Martin, and Peter Farkas (Hulu); Deadwood: The Movie – Eric Hayden, David Altenau, Alex Torres, Joseph Vincent Pike, Ian Northrop, Christopher Flynn, David Blumenfeld, Matthew Rappaport, and David Rand (HBO); Escape at Dannemora: "Episode 6" – Steven Kirshoff, Joe Heffernan, John Bair, Djuna Wahlrab, Matthew Griffin, Shannen Walsh, Joseph Brigati, Vance Miller, and Min Hwa Jung (Showtime); Tom Clancy's Jack Ryan: "Pilot" – Erik Henry, Matt Robken, Jamie Klein, Pau Costa Moeller, Bobo Skipper, Deak Ferrand, Crawford Reilly, Francois Lambert, and Joseph Kasparian (Prime Video)

=== Stunt Coordination ===
Stunt Coordination
**Outstanding Stunt Coordination for a Comedy Series or Variety Program**: **GLOW – Shauna Duggins (Netflix)**‡; Barry – Wade Allen (HBO); Cobra Kai – Hiro Koda and Jahnel Curfman (YouTube Premium); Russian Doll – Christopher Place (Netflix); The Tick – Chris Cenatiempo (Prime Video)	**Outstanding Stunt Coordination for a Drama Series, Limited Series or Movie**: **Game of Thrones – Rowley Irlam (HBO)**‡; The Blacklist – Cort L. Hessler III (NBC); Blindspot – Christopher Place (NBC); S.W.A.T. – Charlie Brewer (CBS); SEAL Team – Peewee Piemonte and Julie Michaels (CBS)

=== Technical Direction ===
Technical Direction
**Outstanding Technical Direction, Camerawork, Video Control for a Series (Area)**: **Last Week Tonight with John Oliver: "Psychics" – Dave Saretsky, August Yuson, John Harrison, Dante Pagano, Jake Hoover, and Phil Salanto (HBO)**‡; The Big Bang Theory: "The Stockholm Syndrome" – John D. O'Brien, John Pierre Dechene, Richard G. Price, James L. Hitchcock, Brian Wayne Armstrong, and John E. Goforth (CBS); Conan: "Episode 1232" – Iqbal S. Hans, John Palacio Jr., Seth Saint Vincent, Nicholas Kober, Ken Dahlquist, James Palczewski, and Ted Ashton (TBS); The Late Late Show with James Corden: "Post AFC Championship Show with Chris Pratt and Russell Wilson" – Oleg Sekulovski, Taylor Campanian, Joel Binger, Scott Daniels, Peter Hutchinson, Michael Jarocki, Adam Margolis, Mark McIntire, Jimmy Verlande, and John Perry (CBS); Saturday Night Live: "Host: Adam Sandler" – Steven Cimino, Frank Grisanti, Susan Noll, John Pinto, Paul Cangialosi, Len Wechsler, Dave Driscoll, and Eric A. Eisenstein (NBC); The Voice: "Live Finale, Part 2" – Allan Wells, Terrance Ho, Diane Biederbeck, Danny Bonilla, Manny Bonilla, Robert Burnette, Suzanne Ebner, Guido Frenzel, Nick Gomez, Alex Hernandez, Marc Hunter, Scott Hylton, Katherine Iacofano, Scott Kaye, Steve Martyniuk, Jofre Rosero, and Steve Simmons (NBC)	**Outstanding Technical Direction, Camerawork, Video Control for a Special**: **The Late Late Show Carpool Karaoke Primetime Special 2019 – Oleg Sekulovski, Taylor Campanian, Joel Binger, Jim Velarde, Edward Nelson, Mark McIntire, Adam Margolis, Jorge Ferris, Mike Jarocki, Peter Hutchison, Charlie Wupperman, Joshua Gitersonke, Ian McGlocklin, Doug Longwill, Joshua Greenrock, Trace Dantzig, William O'Donnell, Max Kerby, and Scott Acosta (CBS)**‡; The Kennedy Center Honors – Eric Becker, J.M. Hurley, Susan Noll, Rob Balton, David Eastwood, Patrick Gleason, Danny Bonilla, Charlie Huntley, Helene Haviland, Steven R. Martyniuk, Jay Kulick, Freddy Frederick, Jimmy O'Donnell, Lyn Noland, Mark Whitman, and Easter Xua (CBS); The Oscars – Kenneth Shapiro, Eric Becker, John Pritchett, Terrence Ho, Guy Jones, Keith Winikoff, Ralph Bolton, David Carline, Bob Del Russo, David Eastwood, Suzanne Ebner, Freddy Frederick, Shaun Harkins, Garrett Hurt, Jay Kulick, Tore Livia, Allen Merriweather, Lyn Noland, George Prince, Dan Webb, Rob Palmer, David Plakos, Easter Xua, Rob Balton, and Danny Bonilla (ABC); RENT – Eric Becker, Charles Ciup, Emelie Scaminaci, Chris Hill, Bert Atkinson, Nat Havholm, Ron Lehman, David Levisohn, Tore Livia, Adam Margolis, Rob Palmer, Brian Reason, Dylan Sanford, Damien Tuffereau, and Andrew Waruszewski (Fox); 72nd Annual Tony Awards – Eric Becker, Mike Anderson, J.M. Hurley, Ka-Lai Wong, Rob Balton, Bob Del Russo, Charlie Huntley, Jay Kulick, John Kosmaczewski, Tore Livia, James Scurti, Lyn Noland, Jimmy O'Donnell, Jim Tufaro, Mark Whitman, and David Smith (CBS)

=== Writing ===
Writing
**Outstanding Writing for a Variety Special**: **Hannah Gadsby: Nanette – Hannah Gadsby (Netflix)**‡; Adam Sandler: 100% Fresh – Adam Sandler (Netflix); Amy Schumer: Growing – Amy Schumer (Netflix); Carpool Karaoke: When Corden Met McCartney Live from Liverpool – Matt Roberts, James Corden, Rob Crabbe, Lawrence Dai, Dicky Eagan, Nate Fernald, Lauren Greenberg, John Kennedy, Ian Karmel, James Longman, Jared Moskowitz, Sean O'Connor, Tim Siedell, Benjamin Stout, Louis Waymouth, and Ben Winston (CBS); Homecoming: A Film by Beyoncé – Beyoncé Knowles-Carter (Netflix); Wanda Sykes: Not Normal – Wanda Sykes (Netflix)	**Outstanding Writing for a Nonfiction Program**: **Anthony Bourdain: Parts Unknown: "Kenya" – Anthony Bourdain (CNN)**‡; The Case Against Adnan Syed: "Forbidden Love" – Amy J. Berg (HBO); Fyre Fraud – Julia Willoughby Nason and Jenner Furst (Hulu); Hostile Planet: "Grasslands" – Bruce Kennedy (Nat Geo); Our Planet: "Jungles" – Huw Cordey, Keith Scholey, Alastair Fothergill, and David Attenborough (Netflix); Wu-Tang Clan: Of Mics and Men: "Episode 1" – Paul Greenhouse, Sacha Jenkins, and Peter J. Scalettar (Showtime)

== Changes ==
The Television Academy announced a few minor changes in the rules of some categories and the addition of a new category.

- The addition of a new category, Outstanding Music Composition for a Documentary Series or Special (Original Dramatic Underscore) recognizing the unique creative process and evaluation criteria for documentary scoring, versus scoring for scripted series or specials.
- The category Outstanding Choreography has been restructured and divided in two, Outstanding Choreography for Variety and Reality Programming (for Variety Series, Variety Special, Structured Reality, Unstructured Reality and Competition Program) and Outstanding Choreography for Scripted Programming (for Comedy Series, Drama Series, Limited Series and Television Movie), both being juried awards.

== Wins by network ==
Network	Program	Individual	Total
HBO	3	22	25
Netflix	4	19	23
Nat Geo	1	7	8
Prime Video	0	8	8
CNN	3	2	5
NBC	1	4	5
CBS	1	3	4
Fox	1	3	4
YouTube	1	3	4
FX	0	3	3
Hulu	0	3	3
SundanceTV	1	2	3
VH1	0	3	3
The CW	0	2	2
ABC	1	0	1
Apple Music	1	0	1
NASA TV	1	0	1
Oculus Store	1	0	1
Twitch	1	0	1

== Programs with multiple awards ==
Program	Awards
Game of Thrones	10
Chernobyl	7
Free Solo	7
The Marvelous Mrs. Maisel	6
Love, Death & Robots	5
Queer Eye	4
Age of Sail	3
Fosse/Verdon	3
RuPaul's Drag Race	3
Russian Doll	3
Saturday Night Live	3
State of the Union	3
The Handmaid's Tale	3
Anthony Bourdain: Parts Unknown	2
Barry	2
Crazy Ex-Girlfriend	2
Fleabag	2
Last Week Tonight with John Oliver	2
Our Planet	2
RENT	2
United Shades of America with W. Kamau Bell	2

== Most nominations ==
Shows that received multiple nominations
Nominations	Show	Network
18	Game of Thrones	HBO
14	Saturday Night Live	NBC
13	Chernobyl	HBO
13	The Marvelous Mrs. Maisel	Amazon Prime Video
10	Fosse/Verdon	FX
10	Our Planet	Netflix
9	The Handmaid's Tale	Hulu
9	Russian Doll	Netflix
8	Barry	HBO
8	The Oscars	ABC
8	RuPaul's Drag Race	VH1
8	True Detective	HBO
7	Deadwood: The Movie	HBO
7	Free Solo	Nat Geo
6	Anthony Bourdain: Parts Unknown	CNN
6	Homecoming: A Film by Beyoncé	Netflix
6	Last Week Tonight with John Oliver	HBO
6	Queer Eye	Netflix
6	The Voice	NBC
5	American Horror Story: Apocalypse	FX
5	Carpool Karaoke: When Corden Met McCartney Live From Liverpool	CBS
5	Escape at Dannemora	Showtime
5	Fleabag	Prime Video
5	Leaving Neverland	HBO
5	RENT	Fox
5	Sharp Objects	HBO
5	When They See Us	Netflix
5	World of Dance	NBC
4	Better Call Saul	AMC
4	Dancing with the Stars	ABC
4	FYRE: The Greatest Party That Never Happened	Netflix
4	GLOW	Netflix
4	The 61st Grammy Awards	CBS
4	Ozark	Netflix
4	Pose	FX
4	RBG	CNN
4	So You Think You Can Dance	Fox
4	Special	Netflix
4	Star Trek: Discovery	CBS
4	This Is Us	NBC
4	72nd Annual Tony Awards	CBS
4	Veep	HBO
3	Born This Way	A&E
3	Crazy Ex-Girlfriend	The CW
3	Deadliest Catch	Discovery Channel
3	Good Omens	Prime Video
3	Hack Into Broad City	Comedy Central
3	Hostile Planet	Nat Geo
3	Killing Eve	BBC America
3	Life Below Zero	Nat Geo
3	Live in Front of a Studio Audience: Norman Lear's All in the Family and The Jeffersons	ABC
3	The Man in the High Castle	Prime Video
3	A Series of Unfortunate Events	Netflix
3	Shark Tank	ABC
3	State of the Union	Sundance TV
3	Three Identical Strangers	CNN
3	Will & Grace	NBC
2	The Amazing Race	CBS
2	Aretha! A Grammy Celebration for the Queen of Soul	CBS
2	Ballers	HBO
2	Bandersnatch (Black Mirror)	Netflix
2	The Big Bang Theory	CBS
2	Catch-22	Hulu
2	CONAN	TBS
2	An Emmy for Megan	anemmyformegan.com
2	Family Guy	Fox
2	The Good Place	NBC
2	Hannah Gadsby: Nanette	Netflix
2	How to Get Away with Murder	ABC
2	Kennedy Center Honors	CBS
2	The Late Late Show Carpool Karaoke Primetime Special 2019	CBS
2	The Late Late Show with James Corden	CBS
2	Love, Death & Robots	Netflix
2	Love, Gilda	CNN
2	RuPaul's Drag Race: Untucked	VH1
2	The Simpsons	Fox
2	Song of Parkland	HBO
2	Springsteen on Broadway	Netflix
2	Succession	HBO
2	Survivor	CBS
2	Tidying Up with Marie Kondo	Netflix
2	Tom Clancy's Jack Ryan	Prime Video
2	The Umbrella Academy	Netflix
2	United Shades of America with W. Kamau Bell	CNN
2	Wanda Sykes: Not Normal	Netflix
2	What We Do in the Shadows	FX
2	When You Wish Upon a Pickle: A Sesame Street Special	HBO

Nominations by Network
Nominations	Network
90	HBO
88	Netflix
44	NBC
37	CBS
29	Amazon Prime Video
23	ABC
23	FX
18	Fox
17	CNN
14	Hulu
13	Nat Geo
13	VH1
8	Showtime
5	A&E
5	Comedy Central
4	AMC
4	PBS
3	BBC America
3	Cartoon Network
3	The CW
3	Discovery Channel
3	Sundance TV
3	TBS
3	YouTube
2	anemmyformegan.com
2	Funny or Die
2	Nat Geo Wild
