= We're Going to the Catskills! =

- The Marvelous Mrs. Maisel episode
- Episode no.: Season 2 Episode 4
- Directed by: Daniel Palladino
- Written by: Daniel Palladino
- Original release date: December 5, 2018
- Running time: 52 minutes

Guest appearances
- Zachary Levi as Benjamin Ettenberg; Saul Rubinek as Pauly; Brandon Uranowitz as Buzz Goldberg

Episode chronology
← Previous "The Punishment Room"	Next → "Midnight at the Concord"

"We're Going to the Catskills!" is the fourth episode of the second season of the American comedy-drama series The Marvelous Mrs. Maisel and the twelfth overall. It was written and directed by Daniel Palladino. The plot follows Midge and her family's trip to a Jewish resort in the Catskill Mountains for the summer. Susie poses as an employee of the resort while booking gigs for Midge. Midge meets Benjamin (Zachary Levi), a bachelor physician who is also vacationing at the resort.

"We're Going to the Catskills!" was released on December 5, 2018, on Amazon Prime. For the episode, the director was nominated for a Primetime Emmy Award and a Directors Guild of America Award. Tony Shalhoub received an Emmy in the Outstanding Supporting Actor in a Comedy Series category. The episode also won three Primetime Emmy Creative Arts Awards from six total nominations.

== Plot ==
Midge (Rachel Brosnahan) and her mother, Rose (Marin Hinkle), select outfits for their family's annual vacation to the Catskills. Later, Midge and Susie (Alex Borstein) meet for lunch where Midge tells her she is going away on vacation for two months, to Susie's displeasure.

Midge, her mother, father (Tony Shalhoub), and children drive to Steiner Mountain Resort, a vacation resort that caters to affluent Jewish people. Abe is displeased when he learns that his favorite staff helper Jimmy is not returning for the summer, and is harsh to his replacement Samuel. Camp director, Pauly (Saul Rubinek) tells Midge that she is ineligible to compete in the bikini competition because she is technically no longer a wife. Joel (Michael Zegen) arrives during the opening reception and asks to stay on their couch because he forgot to reserve his own room. Midge and Joel's separation brings forth judgment from the other vacationers. Joel takes the stage to tell the other guests to treat Midge with respect, which pleases Midge and her family.

Midge and her mother go to the beauty salon. Midge lies and says she has been dating and Rose tells her she will be on the lookout for any good men. Susie later surprises Midge by meeting her in the woods, and says she is posing as a plumber while attempting to book gigs for Midge in the area.

Rose urges Midge to meet a single Jewish doctor named Benjamin Ettenberg (Zachary Levi), the son of a guest Rose met at the salon. Midge finds and interrupts him to insist they spend some time together so that she can tell her mother that they met and it didn't work out. They get in a rowboat but Benjamin refuses to row, to Midge's embarrassment. That night Midge and her parents sit on a blanket by the lake watching fireworks. Joel observes them from a distance. Benjamin, a stranger to him, approaches Joel to bum a cigarette. They smoke together and have a short existential conversation about forgiveness.

== Production ==
Costume director Donna Zakowksa selected this dress to signal Midge's defiance toward Benjamin.

The episode "opens with a shot-for-shot remake of the title sequence from the 1962 film adaptation of To Kill a Mockingbird". It was shot on location in the Catskill Mountains at Scott's Family Resort in Deposit, New York.

Costume director Donna Zakowska selected bright colors and floral patterns for Midge's vacation wardrobe to signify the character's moving forward, and the changing of seasons.

=== Release ===
The episode was released on Amazon Prime on December 5, 2018, along with the rest of the episodes in season two.

== Critical reception ==
The episode received critical acclaim. Sarene Leeds rated the episode 5/5 stars for Vulture.

It received six nominations at the 2019 Primetime Creative Emmy Awards, of which it won three. Daniel Palladino received directing nominations at the Primetime Emmy Awards and the Directors Guild of America Awards. Tony Shalhoub won a Primetime Emmy for Outstanding Supporting Actor for his acting in the episode.

== Awards and nominations ==
Award	Category	Nominee	Result	Ref.
American Cinema Editors Eddie Awards	Best Edited Comedy Series for Non-Commercial Television	Tim Streeto	Nominated	
Art Directors Guild Awards	Excellence in Production Design for a One-Hour Period or Fantasy Single-Camera Series	Bill Groom	Won	
Directors Guild of America Awards	Outstanding Directorial Achievement in Comedy Series	Daniel Palladino	Nominated	
Golden Reel Awards	Broadcast Media Longform Music / Musical	Annette Kudrak	Won	
Primetime Emmy Awards	Outstanding Directing for a Comedy Series	Daniel Palladino	Nominated	
Primetime Creative Arts Emmy Awards	Outstanding Hairstyling for a Single Camera Series	Jerry DeCarlo, Jon Jordan, Peg Schierholz, Christine Cantrell & Sabana Majeed	Won	
Primetime Creative Arts Emmy Awards	Outstanding Make-up for a Single-Camera Series (Non-Prosthetic)	Patricia Regan, Joseph Campayno & Claus Lulla	Nominated	
Primetime Creative Arts Emmy Awards	Outstanding Music Supervision	Robin Urdang, Amy Sherman-Palladino & Daniel Palladino	Won	
Primetime Creative Arts Emmy Awards	Outstanding Period Costumes	Donna Zakowska, Marina Reti & Tim McKelvey	Won	
Primetime Creative Arts Emmy Awards	Outstanding Production Design for a Narrative Period or Fantasy Program (One Hour or More)	Bill Groom, Neil Prince & Ellen Christiansen	Nominated	
Primetime Creative Arts Emmy Awards	Outstanding Single-Camera Picture Editing for a Comedy Series	Ron Bochar, Mathew Price, David Bolton & George A. Lara	Nominated	
