= Billy McFarland =

American con artist (born 1991)

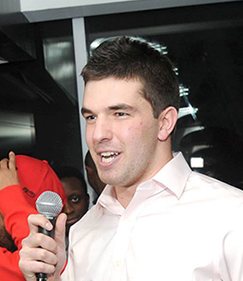
- McFarland in 2014
- Born: William Zervakos McFarland; December 11, 1991 (age 34); New York City, U.S.
- Known for: Fyre Festival
- Title: Founder and CEO of Fyre Media
- Status: Released (September 2022)
- Criminal charges: Mail and wire fraud
- Penalty: Six years imprisonment (less than four years served), $26 million in restitution

William Zervakos McFarland (born December 11, 1991) is an American businessman and entrepreneur who was convicted of financial crimes related to Fyre Festival, having defrauded investors of $27.4 million. In 2022, Vanity Fair described him as "the poster boy for millennial scamming".

In 2013, McFarland founded Magnises, a card-based club marketed for millennials, using $1.5 million of investor funding. He later founded and was CEO of Fyre Media, which developed the Fyre mobile app for booking music talent. In late 2016, along with rapper Ja Rule, McFarland co-founded the Fyre Festival, intended to be a luxury music festival to promote the Fyre app. The 2017 event was cancelled after attendees had already arrived, due to problems with security, food, logistics, understaffing, accommodation, and customs.

In May 2017, McFarland and Ja Rule were sued for $100 million in a class-action lawsuit on behalf of Fyre Festival attendees. The following month, McFarland was arrested and charged with wire fraud in Manhattan federal court for his role in the organization of the festival. After pleading guilty to two counts of wire fraud in March 2018, he was sentenced to six years in federal prison. He was released in late March 2022 after serving less than four years. He announced a Fyre Festival II for May 2025, with tickets going for as high as $1.1 million each, but an investigation by The New York Times found multiple irregularities and the event was later postponed indefinitely.

== Early life and education ==
McFarland was born in New York City in 1991, and was raised in the Short Hills section of Millburn, New Jersey. His parents, Steven and Irene McFarland (née Zervakos), are real estate developers. He graduated from the Pingry School in 2010. He then attended Bucknell University, but he dropped out in May of his freshman year.

== Career ==
After McFarland dropped out of college, he founded the short-lived online advertisement platform Spling, where he served as CEO. TechCrunch described Spling as a content-sharing network, criticizing its similarity to other services which existed at the time.

In August 2013, McFarland seeded payments company Magnises with $1.5 million of investor funding, aiming to create an exclusive "black card" with social perks, such as club membership, targeted at status-oriented millennials in certain big cities. McFarland also launched Fyre Media Inc., the parent company of the Fyre Festival. In a term sheet sent to investors, Fyre Media claimed to be worth $90 million; however, according to authorities, the company only did about $60,000 in business.

== Fyre Festival ==
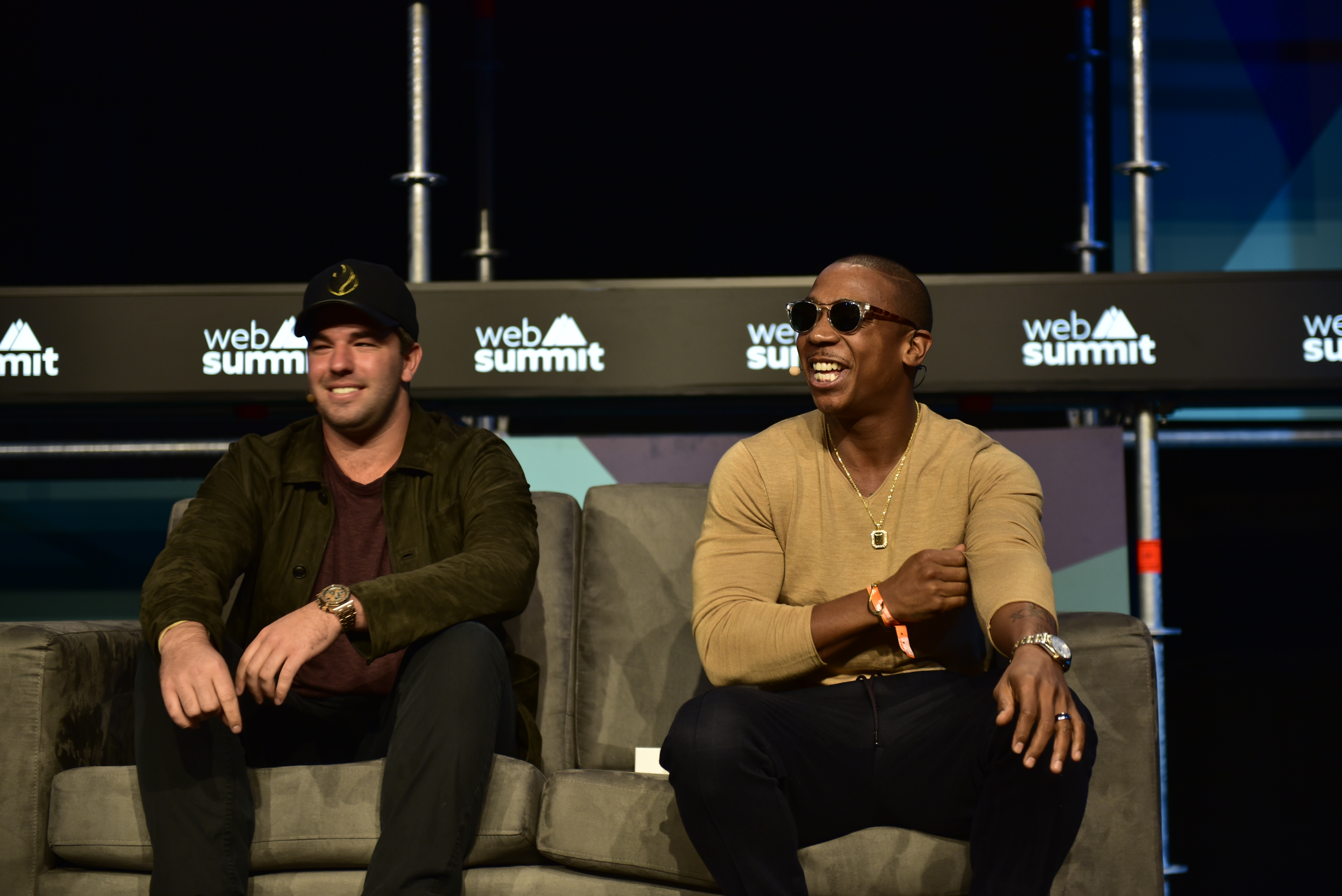
McFarland with Ja Rule at the 2016 Web Summit

McFarland founded Fyre Media and publicized a luxury music festival in the Bahamas, called Fyre Festival, to promote the Fyre music-booking application. The festival, to be held in April 2017, was advertised by a video which included a bevy of Instagram models including Bella Hadid and Emily Ratajkowski who, along with Kendall Jenner, were all expected to be at the festival. However, the festival experienced a number of serious management, administration and misrepresentation issues, and was canceled after guests had begun to arrive at Great Exuma island. Guests were met with tents and pre-packaged sandwiches instead of the lavish villas and meals they were promised. The festival subsequently became the focus of U.S. federal investigations and multiple lawsuits.

McFarland borrowed as much as $7 million in an effort to fund the festival, taking one loan with an effective annualized rate of 120 percent. McFarland defaulted on the loan, and the lender sued.

The controversy around Fyre Festival was detailed in two documentaries in January 2019: Hulu released Fyre Fraud directed by Jenner Furst and Julia Willoughby Nason on January 14, and Netflix released Fyre: The Greatest Party That Never Happened, directed by Chris Smith, on January 18.

== Fraud conviction ==
On April 30, 2017, Fyre Festival organizers Billy McFarland and Ja Rule were sued for $100 million in a class-action lawsuit in relation to the failed Fyre Festival that left attendees stranded on the island of Great Exuma without basic provisions. In addition to the class-action lawsuit filed in May 2017, 6 federal and 4 individual lawsuits were filed in relation to the scheme. McFarland was arrested by federal agents on June 30, 2017, and charged with wire fraud in relation to Fyre and Fyre Festival. He was released on $300,000 bail on July 1. McFarland faced up to 4 years and 9 months under U.S. sentencing guidelines, according to Assistant U.S. Attorney Kristy Greenberg. She added that McFarland's short but eventful career showed a "pattern of deception" and "overpromising luxury experiences that were not delivered". In July 2017, McFarland was represented by a public defender at a bail hearing after his previous legal team "had not been paid enough to continue to represent him". McFarland later hired the private firm Boies, Schiller & Flexner as representation. While on bail, he committed further fraud with a scheme called "NYC VIP Access" selling tickets to events that had either not been announced or for which tickets were unavailable for public purchase, including the Met Gala. Footage of him carrying out this fraud was (inadvertently) recorded and later appeared in Netflix's Fyre documentary.

In March 2018, McFarland pleaded guilty to two counts of wire fraud in federal court in Manhattan and admitted to using fake documents to attract investors to put more than $26 million into his company. He agreed to forfeit $26 million. On June 12, 2018, McFarland was charged with selling fraudulent tickets to events such as the Met Gala, Burning Man, and Coachella while out on bail.

== Incarceration ==
On October 11, 2018, McFarland was sentenced to six years in federal prison. During his time in prison, McFarland says he attempted to write a book using voice notes, and create a podcast using a prison phone. He says that both of these were not allowed, and that he was punished with solitary confinement. In April 2020, during the COVID-19 pandemic, McFarland requested compassionate release from Federal Correctional Institution, Elkton, in Lisbon, Ohio, to avoid contracting the virus, with the reasoning that as an asthmatic he was especially vulnerable to the virus. His request was denied the same month. In July 2020, it was reported that McFarland tested positive for COVID-19 at the facility.

He was released from prison early on March 30, 2022, to be relocated to a halfway house. His time under house arrest ended in September 2022.

== Post-incarceration ==
In October 2022, McFarland teased in a video on TikTok and YouTube Shorts that he was planning a new business venture called "PYRT", with more details to be announced in November 2022. In an interview with Vanity Fair he described it as "virtual immersive decentralized reality". The magazine described it as "Fyre Festival Lite, without the capacity issues". The Government of the Bahamas responded to speculation PYRT may hold events in the country by stating they consider him a "fugitive" and would not endorse any event associated with McFarland.

A civil suit was filed against McFarland by Jonathan Taylor in October 2023. Taylor, who met McFarland in prison, claims that McFarland and his partner Michael Falb agreed to give him one-third equity in PYRT Technologies for a $740,000 investment, but failed to either grant the equity or return the investment.

McFarland was involved with getting hip hop artists to endorse Donald Trump's 2024 presidential campaign.

== Fyre Festival II ==
In April 2023, McFarland announced via Twitter that "Fyre Festival II is finally happening". In August 2023, McFarland announced on TikTok that the "first 100" tickets for Fyre II were on sale for $499, despite no venue, date, or musical acts. Nevertheless, according to McFarland, the tickets sold out.

Fyre Festival II was "scheduled" for May 30, 2025 to June 2, 2025, on Isla Mujeres in Quintana Roo, Mexico. However, the Isla Mujeres municipal government said in a February 2025 statement that no festival permits had been requested or approved. An investigation by The New York Times found that the GPS coordinates for the festival pointed to a landless location in the ocean, off the coast of Cancun. "Skepticism would not be out of place", noted the Times. The "Allegedly Real Tickets", according to Rolling Stone, ranged from $1,400 to $1.1 million each.

In mid-April 2025, Fyre Festival II was postponed indefinitely, and a week later McFarland said the Fyre brand was for sale, being "bigger than what I'm able to lead on my own". In July, McFarland auctioned the Fyre brand on eBay, and expressed disappointment at its "low" sale price of $245,300.

== PHNX Festival ==
In December 2025, McFarland organized and hosted PHNX (pronounced "Phoenix"), a music and adventure festival held on Utila, one of the Bay Islands off the coast of Honduras. The main event spanned two days, with December 6 at Diamond Cay and December 7 at Coral View Beach Resort, drawing dozens or possibly hundreds of attendees with headliner French Montana, and other performers including Slim Jxmmi and Bobby Shmurda. General admission tickets were priced at $599, with artist VIP passes reaching up to $140,000 for a private round-trip flight from Miami. The event was also streamed live online, with McFarland's technology platform allowing virtual attendees to interact with and influence elements of the real-world festival.
