= Fyre Festival =

2017 fraudulent music festival

- 2017 logo
- Dates: April 28–30, May 5–7, 2017 (cancelled)
- Location: Exuma, The Bahamas
- Years active: 2017
- Founders: Billy McFarland; Ja Rule
- Attendance: ~5,000

Fyre Festival was a failed luxury music festival organized by American businessman Billy McFarland and American rapper Ja Rule. It was originally created to promote the company's Fyre app for booking music talent. The festival was scheduled to take place on April 28–30 and May 5–7, 2017, on the Bahamian island of Great Exuma.

The event was promoted on Instagram by social media influencers, actors, reality TV stars and models including Kendall Jenner, Bella Hadid, Hailey Baldwin, and Emily Ratajkowski, many of whom did not initially disclose they had been paid to do so. During the Fyre Festival's inaugural weekend, the event experienced problems related to security, food, accommodation, medical services, and artist relations, resulting in the festival being indefinitely postponed and eventually cancelled. Instead of the gourmet meals and luxury villas for which festival attendees had paid hundreds, or in some cases thousands of dollars, they received packaged sandwiches and were lodged in poorly furnished tents.

In March 2018, McFarland pleaded guilty to one count of wire fraud to defraud investors and ticket holders, and a second count to defraud a ticket vendor (while out on bail). In October 2018, McFarland was sentenced to six years in prison and ordered to forfeit US$26 million. At least eight lawsuits were initiated against the organizers for defrauding ticket buyers, with several seeking class action status and one seeking more than $100 million in damages, and a judgment for US$2 million.

Two documentaries about the events of the festival were released in 2019: Hulu's Fyre Fraud, and Netflix's Fyre: The Greatest Party That Never Happened. It has also been featured on an episode of the Discovery Channel series Hustlers Gamblers Crooks.

In February 2025, it was reported that McFarland was selling tickets for "Fyre 2", to run from May 30 to June 2, 2025. On April 4, 2025, news organizations reported that two cities in Mexico had denied the festival is taking place and have no knowledge of the event; this includes the most recently announced location, Playa del Carmen. The announced dates were canceled on April 16, 2025, with organizers stating that the festival would be eventually rescheduled.

On June 2, 2025, Fyre Festival announced the launch of Fyre Coral View Pop-up and Fyre Hotels, happening at the Coral View Beach Resort on the Island Utila in the Bay Islands of Honduras on September 3 through 10. The consideration of Utila as a possible location and scouting it date back to social media posts from February 29, 2024.

== Planning and organization ==
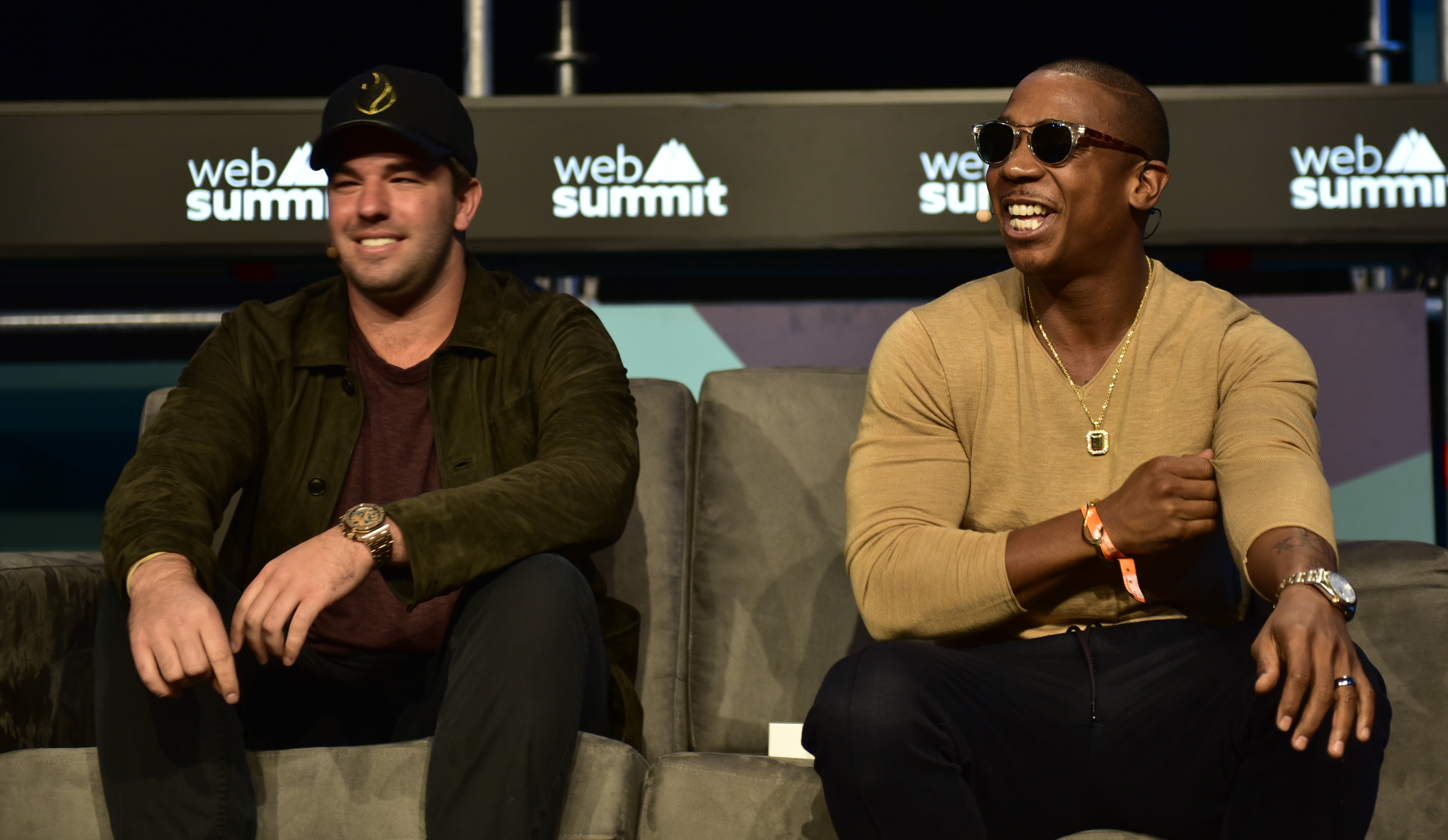
Billy McFarland and Ja Rule at the 2016 Web Summit

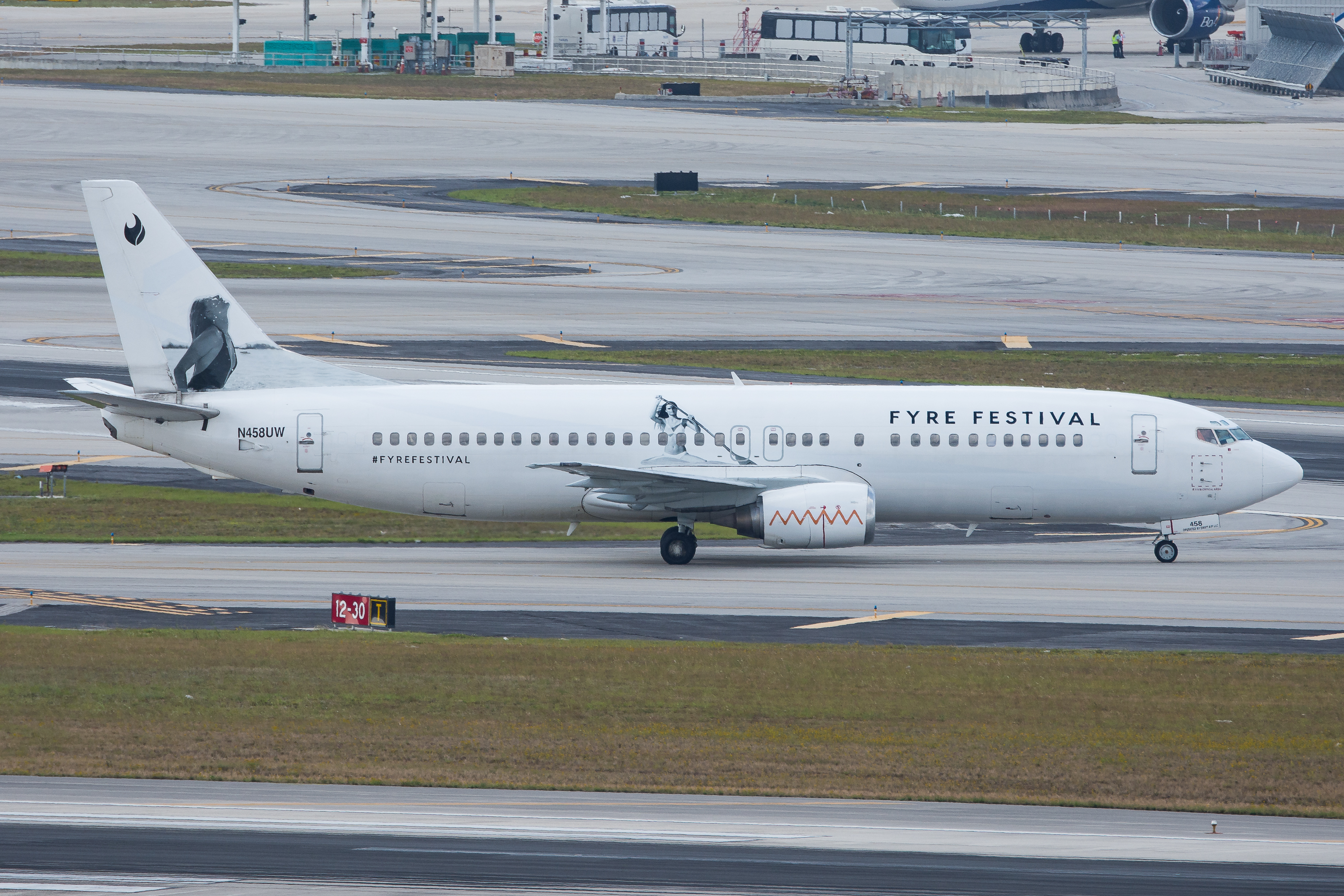
An aircraft used to transport attendees to the festival, featuring Fyre Festival branding

The festival was organized by Billy McFarland and Ja Rule to promote the Fyre music booking app. Ja Rule had come to know McFarland through regular visits to events McFarland hosted for his previous venture, Magnises. During a flight to the Bahamas, McFarland and Ja Rule's private plane touched down on a lightly populated island which they later discovered was Norman's Cay, the former private island of Carlos Lehder Rivas, a kingpin of the Medellín Cartel and a close associate of its leader, Pablo Escobar. McFarland then leased the island from the current owners, with the owners giving the strict condition that McFarland make no reference to Escobar in any marketing materials.

Promotional footage with hired models was shot on Norman's Cay, and planning for the festival went ahead. On December 12, 2016, Kendall Jenner, Emily Ratajkowski, and other influencers paid by Fyre simultaneously posted to their Instagram feeds a video with a thumbnail consisting of an orange square and a logo made of stylized flames. The video showed Bella Hadid and other models represented by her agency running around a tropical beach. Text with the video promised "an immersive music festival ... two transformative weekends ... on the boundaries of the impossible". This was the beginning of the Fyre Festival's promotional campaign, during which McFarland claimed that the island had been owned by Escobar, a falsehood. The owners cancelled their arrangement with McFarland soon after.

After being kicked off of Norman's Cay, the organizers had four months to find a new venue before the Fyre Festival's April 28 start date. After several small islands turned them down, and with two months to go before the festival, they were granted a permit by the Bahamian government to use a site set aside for development at Rokers Point (23.6350°N 75.9188°W) on Great Exuma. Material released on social media continued to promote the falsehood that the festival was being hosted on Escobar's private island, with maps of the site altered to make it appear as if Rokers Point was an island unto itself.

In reality, Great Exuma was neither a private nor remote island, and the Rokers Point site was a remote parking lot, part of an abandoned resort development just north of Sandals Emerald Bay Resort and a nearby marina where locals' boats were stored. McFarland never announced the change; he began referring to the location as "Fyre Cay". With no infrastructure and no villas, the team had under two months to turn Rokers Point into Fyre Cay.

An investor, fashion executive Carola Jain, reportedly arranged for Fyre to receive a $4 million loan, most of which was used to rent luxurious offices in Manhattan's Tribeca neighborhood. With no experience staging an event of the proposed festival's scale, McFarland began approaching companies that did, and was reportedly taken aback when informed the event would cost at least $50 million to stage in the time available, as he had promised. Furthermore, the more experienced consultants told them that in addition to the cost, an event of this magnitude would have needed an extra year to plan. McFarland and his associates at Fyre believed it would cost far less, and continued with their plans under that assumption. The organizers tried to do things themselves where possible; McFarland supposedly learned how to rent the stage by doing a Google Search.

In the days leading up to the festival, they cut expenses extensively, having learned that the luxury villas alone were going to cost $10 million, and targeted funds from deposits to pay for the bands, food, infrastructure, and staff.

Scheduled for two weekends in April and May 2017, the event sold day tickets at prices from $500 to $1,500, and VIP packages including airfare and luxury tent accommodation for $12,000. Customers were promised accommodation in "modern, eco-friendly, geodesic domes" and meals from celebrity chefs. The final advertised lineup was for 33 artists, including Pusha T, Tyga, Desiigner, Blink-182, Major Lazer, Disclosure, Migos, Rae Sremmurd, Kaytranada, Lil Yachty, Matoma, Klingande, Skepta, Claptone, Le Youth, Tensnake, Blond:ish, and Lee Burridge. In the days leading up to the festival, all of these acts pulled out. As a further complication, the first festival weekend coincided with the Exuma Regatta, a Bahamian sailing race series that used most of the island's hotels, vacation rentals and other resources.

While the festival's promotional material kept claiming that the festival would be held on a remote private island that once belonged to Escobar, workers were busy preparing Rokers Point for the festival, scattering sand over its rocks and improving a road to a nearby beach, where they built some cabanas and installed swing seats.

On the mainland, 5,000 tickets had been sold, and an air service was hired to fly festivalgoers from Miami. A medical services company and caterer were also hired, but the caterer withdrew a few weeks before the festival. With two weeks to go, a new catering service was hired with a $1 million total budget, drastically reduced from the $6 million originally allocated to provide what was promised as "uniquely authentic island cuisine... local seafood, Bahamian-style sushi and even a pig roast".

In March 2017, Fyre hired veteran event producer Yaron Lavi, who saw that it was impossible to hold the sort of event McFarland and Ja Rule envisioned at the site. Given the lack of time until the event, he assumed they would postpone it to November as they had been discussing. However, when Fyre told him they would stage the event in the spring anyway, Lavi told them to abandon plans for temporary villas and instead erect tents, the only accommodation that could be delivered in the time remaining. Lavi advised Fyre to make this clear to those who had already bought tickets, as otherwise it would be damaging to their brand. He says the company assured him that an email was being prepared, but when interviewed afterward, he was not sure if it was ever sent.

Comcast Ventures considered investing $25 million in the Fyre app, which McFarland apparently hoped would allow him to finance the festival, but declined days beforehand. Reportedly, McFarland had valued Fyre Media at $90 million, but was unable to provide sufficient proof of that when Comcast requested it.

Writing for New York magazine, one of the event organizers later noted that since at least mid-March there had been significant problems with the planning, and at one point it was suggested they reschedule the 2017 festival until 2018. This idea was dropped at the last minute and it was decided to go on with the event as planned. "Let's just do it and be legends, man", one of the organizers is reported to have said.

After the Comcast deal fell through, McFarland obtained $3 million in temporary financing for Fyre through investor Ezra Birnbaum, with a requirement that the company repay at least $500,000 of the loan within 16 days.

Fyre informed ticket holders that the event would be "cashless (and cardless)", with purchases at the festival to be paid for with an RFID "FyreBand" linked to their credit card (despite warnings that such digital bracelets would be useless because of the poor Wi-Fi connection at the site). In order to raise quick cash for the event, and with under two weeks to go before the inaugural event, attendees were encouraged to load their FyreBands with thousands of dollars in advance, according to one lawsuit. McFarland, who signed the email, suggested that attendees deposit $300–500 for every day they planned to attend. About $2 million from festival goers was taken for these bracelets, 40% of which, according to a lawsuit later filed by Birnbaum, was used by McFarland to pay off the short-term loan.

== Festival events and attendee experiences ==
Early in the morning on April 27, heavy rain fell on Great Exuma, soaking the open tents and mattresses that had been piled out in the open for the guests arriving later that day.

The first flights from Miami International Airport to Exuma International Airport, operated by Swift Air and Xtra Airways, landed at 6:20 a.m. That afternoon, Blink-182 announced that it was withdrawing from the festival, stating in a Twitter post: "We're not confident that we would have what we need to give you the quality of performances we always give our fans."

Initial arrivals were taken to an "impromptu beach party" at a beachside restaurant, where they were plied with alcohol and kept waiting for around six hours while frantic preparations at the festival site continued. McFarland had hired hundreds of local workers to help build the site. Meanwhile, organizers had to renegotiate the guarantees they offered to the people who would be playing at the festival as costs began to rise. Later arrivals were taken directly to the grounds by school bus where they discovered the state of the festival's site: their accommodations were scattered disaster relief tents with dirt floors, some with mattresses that were wet as a result of the morning rain. The food was inadequate and of poor quality, with items such as cheese sandwiches served in foam containers.

Attendees were dropped off at the production bungalow where McFarland and his team were based, and instructed to register. Having waited hours, however, attendees instead rushed to claim their tents. Although there were about 500 attendees at this point, there were not enough tents and beds to accommodate each one. Attendees were unable to leave the festival for the nearby Sandals resort as it was peak season, with almost every hotel on Great Exuma fully booked for the annual Exuma Regatta. Around nightfall, a group of local musicians took to the stage and played for a few hours; this was the only performance to actually occur. In the early morning, it was announced that the festival would be postponed, and the attendees would be returned to Miami as soon as possible.

Reports from the festival mentioned various other problems, such as the mishandling or theft of guests' baggage, no lighting, an unfinished gravel lot, a lack of medical personnel and event staff, no cell phone or internet service, insufficient portable toilets, no running water, and heavy-handed security. As the festival had been promoted as a cashless event, many attendees lacked money for taxi fare or other expenses.

Many attendees were reportedly stranded, as flights to and from the island were cancelled after the Bahamian government issued an order that barred any planes from landing at the airport.

The first flight back to Miami boarded at 1:30 a.m. on April 28, but was delayed for hours due to issues with the flight's manifest. It was cancelled after sunrise, leaving passengers locked in the Exuma Airport terminal with no access to food, water, or air conditioning; a passenger wrote on social media that at least one person there passed out from the heat.

The flight left Exuma later that morning, and more charter flights to Miami departed from Exuma throughout the day. One attendee who was stuck in Miami reported that the pilot of their airplane had told them to get off so they could turn the plane around for immediate departure, as the plane was now serving as a rescue aircraft to get attendees off Great Exuma Island.

== Involved parties ==
=== Organizers ===
In 2013, with $3,100,000 (equivalent to about $4,280,000 in 2025) in venture capital and 25 employees, McFarland had founded a card company called Magnises, which promised that members paying an annual $250 fee could "unlock their cities and take their lives to the next level", including "private members-only concerts, tastings with notable chefs, and exclusive art previews at top galleries". The Washington Post reported that "some of those benefits never materialized or were far from what was advertised". "They send the same email for every problem, but it's like fill-in-the-blanks for what the problem is", a member reported to Business Insider. The Washington Post also reported that McFarland "has a history of overpromising" in his previous business ventures, and cited multiple examples, including McFarland selling VIP tickets to the musical Hamilton for $430 then cancelling at the last minute. In a complaint to the Better Business Bureau, one customer seeking a refund reported getting no response to multiple queries for over a month and a half.

=== Celebrity and social media promoters ===
The event was promoted on Instagram by Kardashian family socialite Kendall Jenner (who was paid $275,000 and has since deleted her post), Bella Hadid, Emily Ratajkowski, Hailey Baldwin, Elsa Hosk, Chanel Iman, Lais Ribeiro, Alessandra Ambrosio, Shanina Shaik, Nadine Leopold, Rose Bertram, Gizele Oliveira, Hannah Ferguson, and other niche actresses and media personalities. Ratajkowski was reportedly the only actress or model to use the hashtag #ad, but has also since deleted her post. Only later was it reported that Jenner and the others had been paid to make the posts, something they were required under federal law to disclose. The Federal Trade Commission said #ad only worked at the beginning of paid posts, and that the hashtag alone was not a sufficient disclaimer. Jenner paid $90,000 in a settlement related to her involvement.

Hadid acknowledged participating in the promotion, and apologized. Baldwin revealed that she donated her entire payment to charity after seeing the aftermath of the event.

FuckJerry and Jerry Media were partially responsible for promotions and social media marketing.

== Aftermath ==
Fyre Festival posted a statement on their website:

Fyre Festival set out to provide a once-in-a-lifetime musical experience on the Islands of the Exumas.

Due to circumstances out of our control, the physical infrastructure was not in place on time and we are unable to fulfill on that vision safely and enjoyably for our guests. At this time, we are working tirelessly to get flights scheduled and get everyone off of Great Exuma and home safely as quickly as we can. We ask that guests currently on-island do not make their own arrangements to get to the airport as we are coordinating those plans. We are working to place everyone on complimentary charters back to Miami today; this process has commenced and the safety and comfort of our guests is our top priority.

The festival is being postponed until we can further assess if and when we are able to create the high- quality [sic] experience we envisioned.

We ask for everyone's patience and cooperation during this difficult time as we work as quickly and safely as we can to remedy this unforeseeable situation. We will continue to provide regular updates via email to our guests and via our official social media channels as they become available.

Ja Rule posted a note on Twitter that said "I wanted this to be an amazing event it was NOT A SCAM as everyone is reporting; I don't know how everything went so left but I'm working to make it right by making sure everyone is refunded." He went on to say "I truly apologize as this is NOT MY FAULT... but I'm taking responsibility." News organizations compared the chaos to William Golding's novel Lord of the Flies and Suzanne Collins's novel The Hunger Games. The Bahamas Ministry of Tourism apologized on behalf of the nation, and denied having any responsibility for how the events unfolded. The workers who constructed the site and the restaurant that provided meals for festival staff were never paid, leading to the restaurant owner appealing for assistance on the crowdfunding platform GoFundMe.

Fyre Festival announced that it would offer all attendees a choice between a full refund or VIP tickets to a festival proposed for the following year (which was not held).

=== Lawsuits ===
As a result of the festival, McFarland and Ja Rule were the subject of a $100 million lawsuit in the state of California. It was filed on behalf of plaintiff Daniel Jung by entertainment lawyer Mark Geragos, who sought class action status for the lawsuit, with more than 150 plaintiffs. The lawsuit alleged fraud, breach of contract (partly because of the decision by the organizers to make the festival cashless so that attendees didn't bring money for taxis), breach of covenant of good faith (partly due to the inadequate catering and the incident where attendees were locked in the airport), and negligent misrepresentation. Ben Meiselas of Geragos's firm pledged to hold "all those who recklessly and blindly promoted the festival" accountable, which was interpreted as being directed at Jenner, Hadid, and other social media influencers. A Geragos lawyer stated that Fyre Festival sent cease and desist letters to whistleblowers. Ja Rule was dismissed from the lawsuit in July 2019.

A second class action lawsuit against Fyre Media, McFarland, Ja Rule, and the event promoters identified as "Does 1–100" was filed in Los Angeles by personal injury lawyer John Girardi on behalf of three attendees. The plaintiff alleges that they deceived patrons into attending the festival by paying more than 400 social media personalities and celebrities to promote it. The parties were accused of breach of contract, negligent misrepresentation, and fraud, but the suit was later dismissed. After the second class action lawsuit, a Bloomberg reporter filed a FOIA request to the FTC regarding their Instagram knowledge.

A third lawsuit was filed in New York federal court against Ja Rule, McFarland, Fyre Media, and chief marketing officer Grant Margolin. Plaintiffs Matthew Herlihy and Anthony Lauriello accused the festival organizers of "false representations, material omissions... negligence, fraud, and violations of consumer protection statutes". "Upon the arrival of guests to the island of Great Exuma for the first weekend, the island was lacking basic amenities, was covered in dirt, and guests had to sleep in tents with wet blankets," the suit claims. "There were no communal showers or bathrooms as promised; instead there were porta potties (only about one for every 200 yards) that were knocked down and only three showers although there were hundreds of people arriving." This lawsuit was dismissed in November 2019 with leave to replead with respect to particular allegations against Ja Rule.

On May 4, another lawsuit was filed by National Event Services (NES), which provided medical services for the festival and claimed to have suffered $250,000 in damages, alleging breach of contract, fraud, and negligence by the organizers. The suit alleged that Fyre "failed and/or refused" to buy cancellation insurance and "failed to secure a contract with a medical evacuation helicopter or plane". NES employees reported that the local medical clinic was closed and the accommodation was "uninhabitable" with "bug infestation, bloodstained mattresses, and no air conditioning".

Also in May, festival attendee Andrew Petrozziello filed a lawsuit in New Jersey federal court alleging that the organizers violated the state's consumer fraud act and committed breach of contract.

A sixth lawsuit, filed in Florida federal court as a class action suit, alleged violations that include fraud, negligence, and breach of contract. The plaintiffs, Kenneth and Emily Reel, accused the organizers of sending cease and desist letters to people who criticized the festival on social media.

A seventh lawsuit was filed in Manhattan federal court as a class action suit on behalf of Sean Daly and Edward Ivey. In addition to the infractions mentioned in the other lawsuits, this suit alleges unjust enrichment and violation of New York state business law, claiming that the organizers continued to offer VIP upgrades and opportunities to deposit money into the "Fyre Band" payment system after the festival had been canceled.

An eighth lawsuit was filed in Suffolk County Superior Court in Boston on behalf of ticketing vendor Tablelist. The company is alleging that the festival organizers and financial backers committed breach of contract and fraudulently deceived Tablelist and ticket purchasers. Tablelist is seeking $3.5 million to refund customers, as well as damages resulting from loss of business after being forced to lay off 40% of their workforce to focus on the litigation.

On July 3, 2018, two North Carolina attendees, Seth Crossno and Mark Thompson, were awarded $5 million in damages. The judgment was granted against Billy McFarland in absentia after he failed to respond to the court proceedings. Ja Rule was initially named as a co-defendant, but was later removed from the suit after an undisclosed private agreement with the two attendees' attorney.

Ja Rule said in January 2019 that he had also been defrauded by McFarland; in November 2019, he was dismissed from a class action lawsuit filed by festival attendees, the judge determining that it had not been proven his promotion of the festival on social media had directly led to the plaintiffs' attending.

=== Criminal investigation ===
On May 21, 2017, The New York Times reported McFarland and his associates were under an active federal criminal investigation by the Federal Bureau of Investigation for mail fraud, wire fraud, and securities fraud. The case was overseen by the United States Attorney for the Southern District of New York. On June 30, 2017, McFarland was arrested and charged with one count of wire fraud.

In March 2018, McFarland pleaded guilty to one count of wire fraud in what the U.S. Justice Department called a scheme to defraud investors, as well as a second count of wire fraud related to a scheme to defraud a ticket vendor. In October 2018, McFarland was sentenced to six years in prison and ordered to forfeit $26 million.

On July 24, 2018, the Securities and Exchange Commission (SEC) announced that McFarland, two companies he founded, a former senior executive, and a former contractor agreed to settle charges arising out of an extensive, multi-year offering fraud that raised at least $27.4 million from over 100 investors. McFarland admitted to the SEC's allegations against him, agreed to a permanent director-and-officer bar, and agreed to disgorgement of $27.4 million. Grant H. Margolin, Daniel Simon, Fyre Media, and Magnises, Inc. agreed to the settlement without admitting or denying the charges. Margolin has agreed to a seven-year director-and-officer bar and must pay a $35,000 penalty, and Simon has agreed to a three-year director-and-officer bar and must pay over $15,000 in disgorgement and penalty. As of 2018, the settlements were subject to court approval.

=== Compensation ===
Like other Bahamian suppliers, the caterer who worked on the event was not paid; in 2019 a crowdfunding appeal raised over $200,000 to compensate her. In August 2020, the United States Marshals Service auctioned Fyre Festival-branded merchandise that McFarland had kept for future sale, with the proceeds to go to victims.

== Films ==
In 2019, two documentary films were released that covered the Fyre Festival and McFarland.

Fyre Fraud, directed by Jenner Furst and Julia Willoughby Nason, premiered on Hulu on January 14, 2019. On the review aggregation website Rotten Tomatoes, the film holds a 79% approval rating with an average rating of 6.41 out of 10, based on 28 reviews. Metacritic, which uses a weighted average, assigned the film a score of 66 out of 100, based on 12 critic reviews, indicating "generally favorable reviews". The documentary was the subject of some controversy after it was revealed that the filmmakers had paid McFarland to be interviewed for their film.

Fyre, directed by Chris Smith, was released by Netflix on January 18, 2019. Like Fyre Fraud, the film received positive reviews. On Rotten Tomatoes, the film holds a 90% rating with an average rating of 7.54 out of 10, based on 73 reviews. On Metacritic, the film holds a score of 76 out of 100, based on 26 critic reviews, indicating "generally favorable reviews". FuckJerry and Jerry Media helped produce the film, though they neglected to acknowledge their involvement and participation in the festival's marketing.

Fyre 3: The Mostly Crowd-Funded Documentary, was released on February 12, 2019. Directed by comedian and filmmaker Joey Clift, the film offers a satirical take on the Fyre Festival and its surrounding media frenzy. It features appearances by notable internet personalities and entertainers including viral political figure Ken Bone and professional wrestler Dolph Ziggler.

== Planned Fyre Festival 2 ==
On April 8, 2023, after his release from prison, McFarland tweeted that there was to be a Fyre Festival II and claimed to have already secured funding for the event. The first 100 tickets were put on sale at $499, with a statement that prices later would increase. The festival's website said that the event was "targeted for the end of 2024 in the Caribbean", and that the first batch of tickets had sold out within a day. On February 29, 2024, McFarland posted on Instagram that Fyre Fest 2 was being scheduled for February 2025 at the Coral View Beach Resort on the Honduran island of Utila. On April 23, McFarland posted on Instagram and Twitter a list of four locations being considered: Belize, Cuba, the Dominican Republic, and Utila.

On September 4, 2024, The Wall Street Journal reported that McFarland confirmed Fyre Festival II, set to take place in the Caribbean. The only specific location in the article was Utila, with the Coral View Beach Resort as a potential site; its owner, Heath Miller, expressed optimism about the event's potential to bring economic benefits to local businesses and confidence in the future of Fyre Festival on Utila. Miller also confirmed that he and McFarland had been discussing the festival since an in-person meeting in February 2024.

On February 24, 2025, McFarland told Today that "Fyre 2" was now planned to run from May 30 to June 2, 2025, on Isla Mujeres, off the coast of Cancún, Mexico, with a total of 2,000 tickets going on sale for non-refundable prices ranging from US$1,400 (one person, excluding travel and accommodation) to $1.1 million (all inclusive, for eight people). Retired NFL player and musician Antonio Brown was the first act announced. The location was given as 21°12′32.3″N 86°43′43.3″W. However, as of February 27, 2025, the tourism directorate of Isla Mujeres, the minister for tourism in Quintana Roo, and the hotels that the Fyre website lists as providing guest accommodation all said that they knew nothing about the event and had not received any approach or enquiry.

The social media account for the festival changed the location to Playa del Carmen in March 2025. On April 2, 2025, a Playa del Carmen city official stated on social media that there is no record of a festival being planned at Playa del Carmen, and that the "rumours about a supposed event" were false.

To combat the claims that no planning had taken place, McFarland released copies of permits that Fyre Fest 2 had obtained for an event at Martina Beach Club in Playa del Carmen. The permits allow a party for four hours from midnight on 30 May and 1 June 2025, with recorded music only and a limit of 250 attendees.

On April 16, 2025, tickets were no longer available for sale. Its website was updated to state that the festival had been postponed and would be rescheduled at a later date.

On April 24, 2025, the website and Instagram page were updated. McFarland put the entire Fyre brand up for sale, including its "cultural capital" and music festival, to become whatever a buyer wanted it to be. The assets were put up for sale on auction site eBay in July 2025, selling for $245,300. McFarland streamed the auction and near to the auction's close said "Damn. This sucks, it's so low." It was ultimately unveiled that the NFT marketplace LimeWire had won the bid for the assets.

== PHNX project ==
PHNX is an event concept promoted by McFarland following the failure of the Fyre Festival and later revival attempts. The project has been framed as a symbolic "rise from the ashes", with McFarland positioning PHNX as a rebrand intended to move beyond the Fyre name rather than operate as a direct continuation of the original festival. In public statements and interviews, McFarland emphasized lessons learned after his federal conviction for wire fraud and subsequent prison sentence, describing PHNX as part of a restructured and more transparent approach to live events.

PHNX was announced in summer 2025 primarily through social media and limited media interviews. Coverage described the project as distancing itself from the luxury-focused marketing that defined Fyre Festival, instead emphasizing more modest expectations, phased planning, and clearer disclosures regarding talent, accommodations, and logistics. Media outlets consistently contextualized PHNX within the broader history of Fyre Festival and its cultural fallout, questioning whether the new branding represented a substantive reset or primarily a reputational rehabilitation effort following one of the most publicized failures in modern music festival history.

PHNX drew renewed attention in late 2025 after McFarland staged a small-scale live event in Utila, Honduras, taking place at both the Coral View Beach Resort and Diamond Cay with former Webster Hall VP Heath Miller coproducing the festival. Reporting noted that the event took place with live performances and basic infrastructure, though on a significantly smaller scale than Fyre Festival and with mixed reactions from observers.

Reception to PHNX was mixed. Some commentators framed the project as an example of re-entry into the live events industry after a high-profile failure, while others expressed skepticism rooted in the unresolved legacy of Fyre Festival. Subsequent reporting emphasized that PHNX's long-term credibility would depend on consistent execution rather than branding alone, and that the project remained closely associated with the narrative arc of Fyre Festival and its aftermath.

== In popular culture ==
In 2018, American punk band Alkaline Trio – whose singer and guitarist Matt Skiba also played in Blink-182, one of the first acts to cancel their planned performance at the festival – released their album Is This Thing Cursed?, which included "Goodbye Fire Island", a song inspired by Blink-182's involvement.

In 2019, Ryan Reynolds based a commercial for his gin brand on an anecdote Andy King, a Fyre Festival producer, told in Netflix's Fyre documentary about being prepared to perform oral sex on a customs officer to "save the festival". In the commercial, King, hearing Reynolds ask, "Can you ever really go too far for your company? I don't think so", approvingly says, "He gets it."

In 2019, HBO's comedy television series Silicon Valley depicted the fictional RussFest, a music event in the desert with similarities to the real-life Fyre Festival.

In 2025, Fyre Fest: The Musical was announced to be in development for an anticipated Broadway run. The development team includes director Bryan Buckley, director Taika Waititi, musician Rita Ora, and music producer Paul Epworth along with Hungry Man Productions.

== See also ==
- List of music festivals
- Some of many other events that did not go as planned:
  - DashCon - 2014 Tumblr fan convention, later revived by unrelated parties in 2025
  - TanaCon
  - Woodstock '99 – a Woodstock 30th anniversary festival, marred by riots and sexual assaults
  - Woodstock 50, a planned 2019 50th anniversary festival, cancelled due to unstable financing
  - The Bamboozle, planned for May 2023, canceled because the promoter never properly secured the permits for the festival
  - 2021 Astroworld Festival, where crowd crushes caused multiple deaths and injuries
  - Willy's Chocolate Experience, which drew Glasgow police to address attendees' disappointment
  - 2026 Barbie Dream Fest, which refunded tickets to attendees, who felt as if they were "trapped in a big, dark warehouse"
