= Fyre Fraud =

2019 documentary film

- Directed by: Julia Willoughby Nason; Jenner Furst
- Written by: Julia Willoughby Nason; Jenner Furst; Lana Barkin; Jed Lipinski
- Produced by: Lana Barkin
- Starring: Billy McFarland
- Cinematography: Jay Silver; Luca Del Puppo; Evan Jake Cohen; Ty Stone
- Edited by: Devin Concannon; Megan Brennan; Matt Prinzing
- Music by: Danielle Furst; Khari Mateen
- Production companies: Cinemart; Mic; Billboard
- Distributed by: Hulu
- Release date: January 14, 2019
- Running time: 96 minutes
- Country: United States
- Language: English

Fyre Fraud is a 2019 American documentary film about the fraudulent Fyre Festival, a 2017 music festival in the Bahamas. It was directed by Julia Willoughby Nason and Jenner Furst, and premiered on January 14, 2019, on Hulu.

== Premise ==
The film was described in its press release as a "true-crime comedy bolstered by a cast of whistleblowers, victims, and insiders going beyond the spectacle to uncover the power of FOMO and an ecosystem of enablers, driven by profit and a lack of accountability in the digital age."

== Production ==
On April 16, 2018, it was announced that Hulu was developing a docuseries about the infamous failed 2017 music festival Fyre Festival. It was set to be directed by Julia Willoughby Nason and Jenner Furst, and executive produced by Michael Gasparro, John Amato, Dana Miller, Joanna Zwickel, Angela Freedman, and Sharmi Gandhi. Production companies involved with the project were slated to include The Cinemart, Mic and Billboard.

Then, on January 14, 2019, Fyre Fraud, which was now a feature-length documentary, debuted on Hulu in a surprise "rush release" with no promotion, advertising, or press preceding the launch. The premiere allowed Hulu to get their project out to audiences four days before Netflix's documentary about the same subject, Fyre, was released.

In February 2019, Entertainment One acquired the international rights to Fyre Fraud.

== Reception ==
The film was met with a positive response from critics upon its release. On the review aggregator website Rotten Tomatoes, 79% of 29 critics' reviews of the film are positive, with an average rating of 6.3/10; the site's "critics consensus" reads: "In the battle over Fyre Festival content, Fyre Fraud comes out swinging with a questionable interview of conman Billy McFarland and a thoughtful exploration of nefarious social strategy." On Metacritic, the film has a weighted average score of 66 out of 100 based on reviews from 12 critics, indicating "generally favorable" reviews.

In a positive review, Nick Allen of RogerEbert.com gave the film a rating of 3½ out of 4 stars, writing: "Fyre Fraud does not just dunk on McFarland, Ja Rule, and anyone who might be complicit—they’re clowns already, their plainly not-smart choices and astounding arrogance making for super-size schadenfreude. More persuasively, it's a damnation of the mentality that helped make it possible, calling out a culture that progressively puts more value into how you make yourself look online." In a similarly favorable analysis, Decider's Joel Keller commended the film and recommended that viewers stream it, declaring: "Fyre Fraud is a fascinating examination of social media influencers, millennials who get hooked on their feelings of FOMO, and a modern-day con artist who will likely learn nothing from this or his prison sentence."

In a more mixed assessment, Brian Tallerico of Collider gave the film a "B−" grade and said: "With a bit more polish and a bit more confidence, Fyre Fraud would be a powerful documentary that used Fyre Festival as a springboard for a more incisive examination of fraud in the age of social media, using the festival as a metaphor for expectations versus reality, which (as my wife astutely pointed out), is a mirror for how social media tends to function. Instead, Fyre Fraud is content to exist as a dark comedy of sorts, poking fun at the players involved without really absorbing the seriousness or gravity of their actions."

=== Accolades ===
At the 71st Primetime Creative Arts Emmy Awards, Fyre Fraud was nominated for Outstanding Writing for a Nonfiction Program.
