= Fyre (film) =

2019 documentary film by Chris Smith

Fyre: The Greatest Party That Never Happened
- Promotional poster
- Directed by: Chris Smith
- Produced by: Danny Gabai; Chris Smith; Mick Purzycki
- Cinematography: Cory Fraiman-Lott; Henry Zaballos; Jake Burghart
- Edited by: Jon Karmen; Daniel Koehler
- Production companies: Jerry Media; Library Films; Vice Studios; MATTE Projects
- Distributed by: Netflix
- Release date: January 18, 2019
- Running time: 97 minutes
- Country: United States
- Language: English

Fyre (also known as Fyre: The Greatest Party That Never Happened) is a 2019 American documentary film directed by Chris Smith. It chronicles the planning, failure, and aftermath of the 2017 Fyre Festival, putting the blame primarily on the event's organizer, businessman Billy McFarland. The film premiered on Netflix on January 18, 2019, and the site later reported that 20 million households streamed Fyre during its first month of release.

== Production ==
The film was co-produced by Jerry Media, the social media agency responsible for promoting the Fyre Festival and covering up the fraud, and MATTE Projects, the production company that directed the Fyre Festival's promotional shoot. It has been reported that Jerry Media approached VICE with the idea of a documentary three months after the disastrous festival, while Netflix has said the film was director Chris Smith's idea.

== Reception ==
On the review aggregator website Rotten Tomatoes, 93% of 94 critics' reviews of the film are positive, with an average rating of 7.6/10; the site's "critics consensus" reads: "Fyre smolders with agonizing tension when a party in paradise goes awry, but this slickly assembled documentary reserves its greatest horror for damning observations about the dangers of wealth." On Metacritic, the film has a weighted average score of 75 out of 100 based on reviews from 26 critics, indicating "generally favorable" reviews.

In a review about both Fyre and Fyre Fraud, a similar documentary that premiered on Hulu four days before Fyre premiered on Netflix, The A.V. Club stated that "Fyre is the stronger, more worthwhile documentary, but its counterpart is a helpful reminder that, like so many stories, one account can't contain the whole truth."

=== Accolades ===
At the 71st Primetime Creative Arts Emmy Awards, Fyre was nominated in four categories (Outstanding Documentary or Nonfiction Special, Outstanding Directing for a Documentary/Nonfiction Program, Outstanding Sound Editing for a Nonfiction Program (Single or Multi-Camera), and Outstanding Sound Mixing for a Nonfiction Program (Single or Multi-Camera)), though it did not win any awards.

== Claims of bias ==
Some critics have questioned the involvement behind the scenes of Jerry Media and MATTE Projects, the two primary marketing companies behind the promotion of the Fyre Festival itself. According to a report appearing in The New Republic, when the festival began to fall apart, Billy McFarland hired freelance cinematographer Michael Swaigen, who had also filmed the original viral ad for the festival, to film behind the scenes footage, in hopes that revenue from a so-called "recovery documentary" would help recoup some of his losses. After filming, Swaigen returned to California, and claims McFarland failed to compensate him fully, so he retained ownership of the footage.

Swaigen was then contacted by Vice Media, who arranged a meeting at their offices in New York in October 2017 with, among others, director Chris Smith. After returning home, Swaigen met with Ja Rule, who informed him of the plans for a competing documentary at Hulu, and he contacted the filmmakers of that project. He later commented that "It just felt better than anything that I had been through with [Vice]", and went on to be one of the interview subjects in, and a co-producer of, Hulu's film Fyre Fraud.

In January 2018, Swaigen met with FuckJerry/Jerry Media CEO Mick Purzycki, who had become a producer of the Netflix film. Swaigen claimed that, by this point, Vice was no longer in communication with him, and there was "no more talk of Vice" from Smith or the producers, who had become dominated by personnel from Jerry Media (Purzycki, Elliot Tebele and James Ohliger) and MATTE Projects (Max Pollack, Matthew Rowean, and Brett Kincaid). In an email sent to Swaigen by Purzycki on March 25, 2018, Purzycki wrote that "I have final cut on the film and will not be approving anything that is not done with integrity", though Netflix has said that "the final cut was with the director."

In the leadup to the releases of the competing documentaries, Chris Smith accused Fyre Fraud-director Jenner Furst of being unethical by agreeing to pay McFarland to appear in the film. Furst, in turn, publicly accused Netflix of helping FuckJerry/Jerry Media downplay its own complicity in the disaster, stating to The Ringer: "We have emails that prove that people knew months in advance what was going on and we have a whistle-blower from inside that social media company who says that he knew months before that this wasn't going to be what it was sold as. [...] It's a little bit of a head-scratcher to say that we have an ethical quandary when it seems like people who got the rest of the world knee deep in shit are making large licensing fees and getting prestige when this thing comes out on Friday. To me, I think it's a little bit of the pot calling the kettle black."

== See also ==
- List of original films distributed by Netflix
