= 52nd NAACP Image Awards =

American entertainment awards for 2020 works

- Date: March 27, 2021 (main televised ceremony) March 22–26, 2021 (non-televised awards)
- Hosted by: Anthony Anderson
- Official website: NAACPImageAwards.net

Television coverage
- Network: BET; BET Her; CBS; CMT; Comedy Central; Logo; MTV; MTV2; Paramount Network; Pop; Pluto TV; Smithsonian Channel; TV Land; VH1 (simulcast)

The 52nd NAACP Image Awards, presented by the NAACP, honored outstanding representations and achievements of people of color in motion pictures, television, music, and literature during the 2020 calendar year. The ceremony aired on March 27, 2021, on BET and simulcast on several of its sister ViacomCBS Networks, with CBS airing the ceremony for the first time. The ceremony was hosted for the eighth time by actor Anthony Anderson. Presentations of untelevised categories were livestreamed between March 22–26, 2021 on the ceremony's website.

The nominations were announced on February 4, 2021. During the ceremony, the Hall of Fame Award was given to Eddie Murphy for "his contributions to the African-American film industry", LeBron James was awarded with the President's Award for "his contributions in the fight for social justice", and Rev. D. James Lawson was awarded with the Chairman's Award "to recognize his work as a social change advocate and his significant contributions to the civil rights movement, specifically the essential role in the south's nonviolent protests in the 1960s". For the first time in the history of the awards ceremony, categories were created to honor animated works in film and television, and the category for voice-over work was broken into two separate categories, respectively for film and television.

All nominees are listed below, and the winners are listed in bold.

== Special awards ==
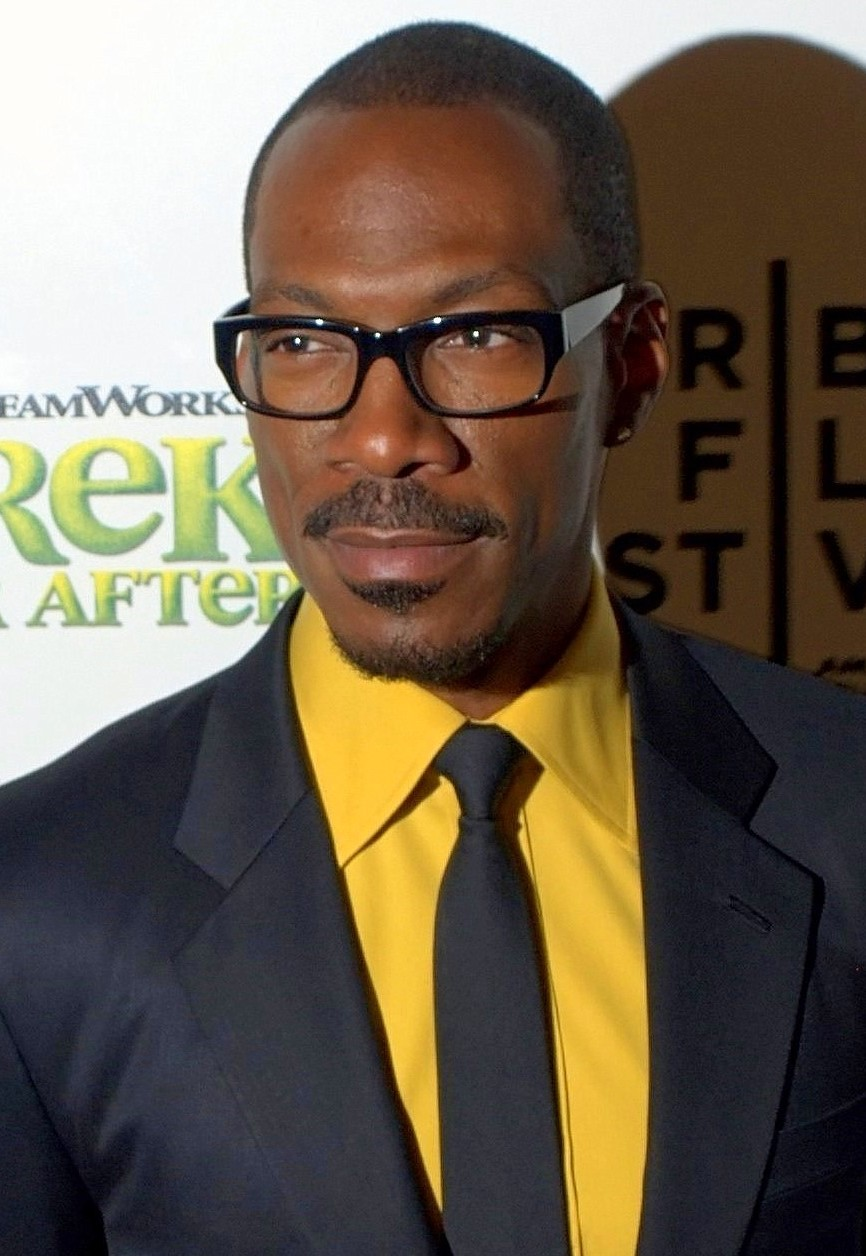
Eddie Murphy is the 37th person to be included in the NAACP Hall of Fame Award, the first since 2009.

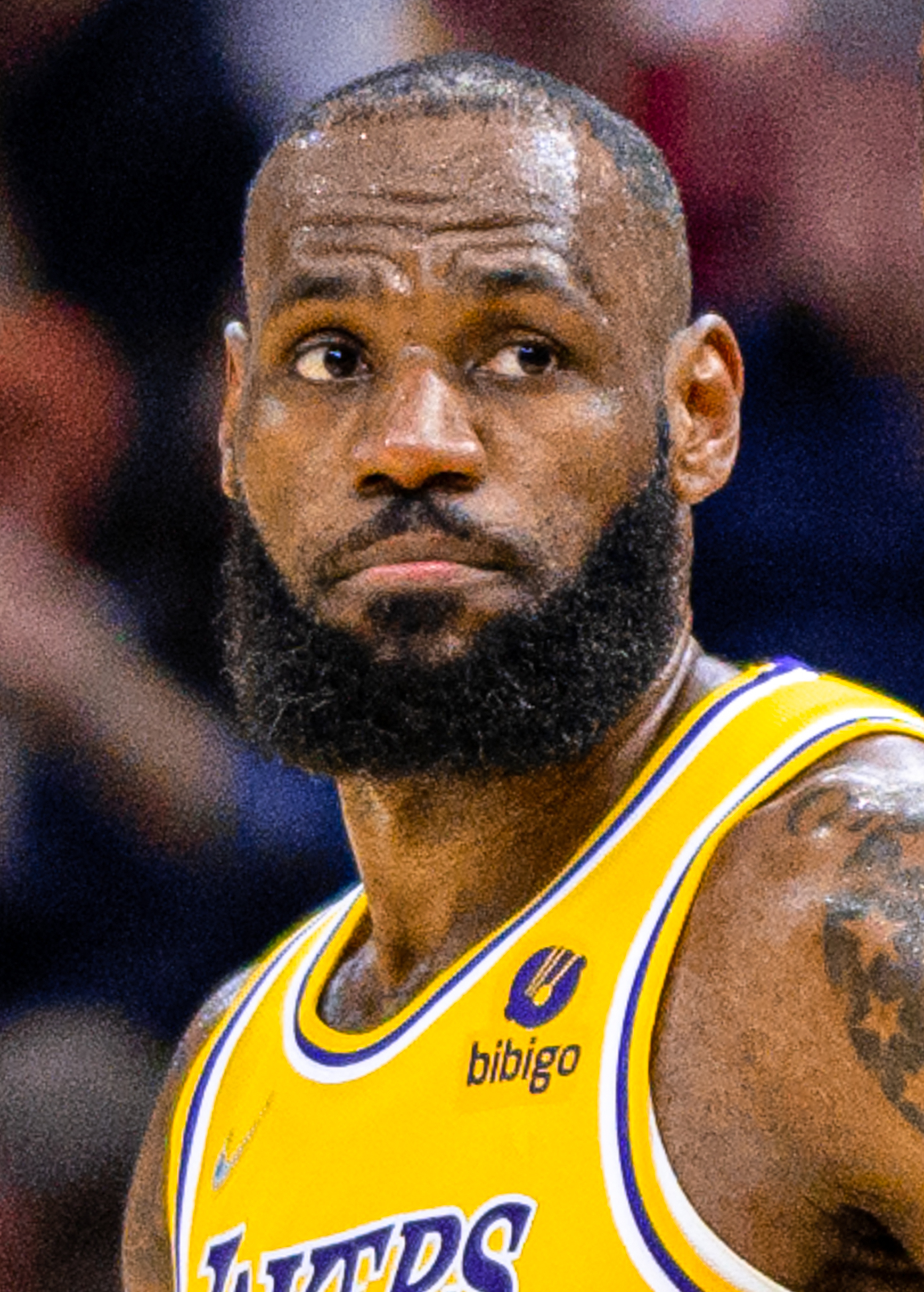
LeBron James was honored with the President's Award.

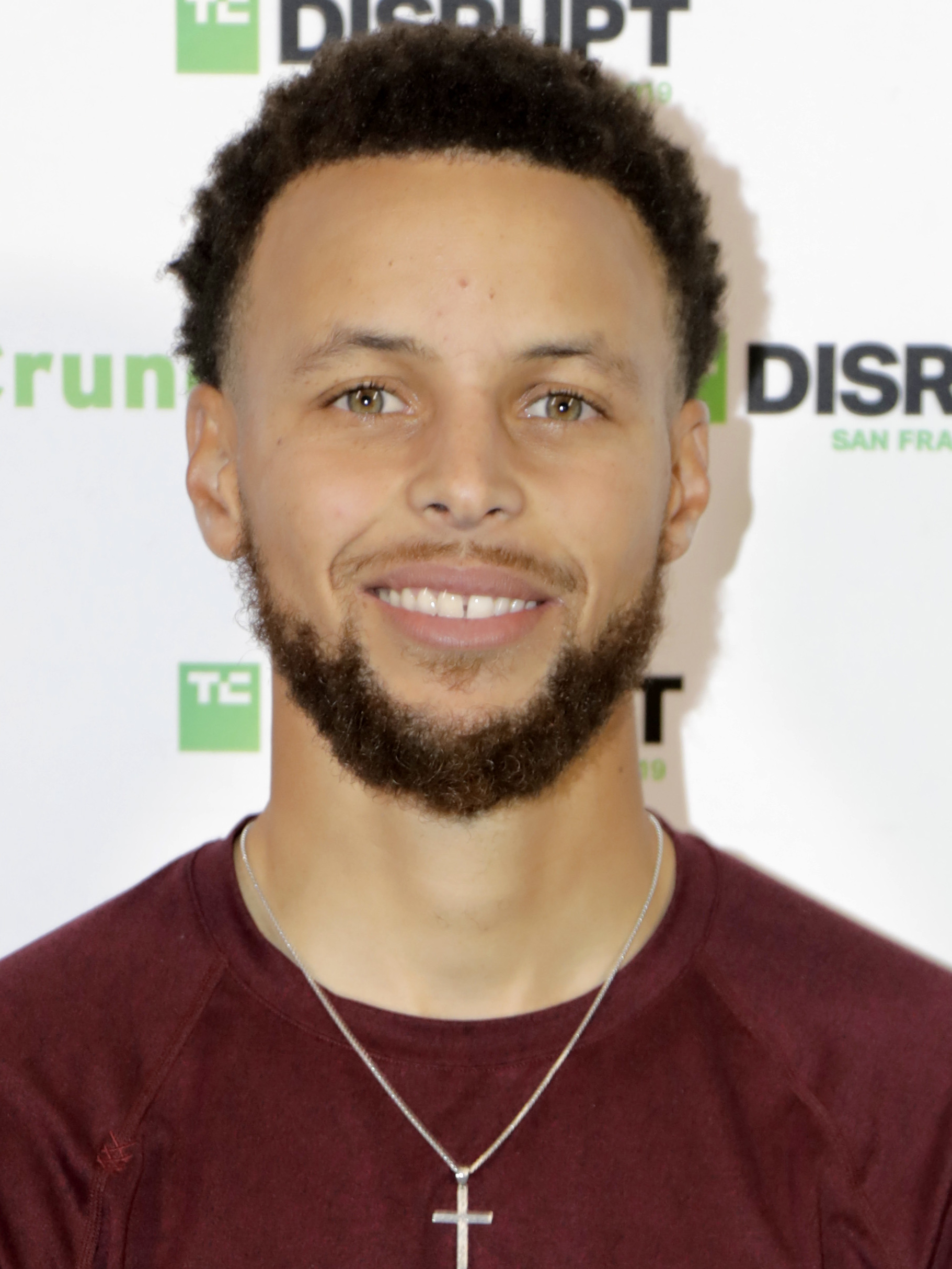
Stephen Curry is the 9th person to be honored with the NAACP Jackie Robinson Sports Award.

Hall of Fame Award
- **Eddie Murphy**
President's Award
- **LeBron James**
Chairman's Award
- **Rev. James Lawson**
Entertainer of the Year
**D-Nice**
- Regina King
- Viola Davis
- Trevor Noah
- Tyler Perry
Social Justice Impact Award
- **Stacey Abrams**
  - April Ryan
  - Debbie Allen
  - LeBron James
  - Tamika Mallory
Activist of the Year
- **Rev. Dr. Wendell Anthony**
Jackie Robinson Sports Award
- **Stephen Curry** and **WNBA Players Association**

== Motion picture ==
| Outstanding Motion Picture | Outstanding Directing in a Motion Picture |
|---|---|
| **Bad Boys for Life**; Da 5 Bloods; Jingle Jangle: A Christmas Journey; Ma Rainey's Black Bottom; One Night in Miami... | **Gina Prince-Bythewood – The Old Guard**; David E. Talbert – Jingle Jangle: A Christmas Journey; George C. Wolfe – Ma Rainey's Black Bottom; Radha Blank – The Forty-Year-Old Version; Regina King – One Night in Miami... |
| Outstanding Actor in a Motion Picture | Outstanding Actress in a Motion Picture |
| **Chadwick Boseman – Ma Rainey's Black Bottom**; Anthony Mackie– The Banker; Delroy Lindo – Da 5 Bloods; Forest Whitaker – Jingle Jangle: A Christmas Journey; Will Smith – Bad Boys for Life | **Viola Davis – Ma Rainey's Black Bottom**; Issa Rae – The Photograph; Janelle Monáe – Antebellum; Madalen Mills – Jingle Jangle: A Christmas Journey; Tracee Ellis Ross – The High Note |
| Outstanding Supporting Actor in a Motion Picture | Outstanding Supporting Actress in a Motion Picture |
| **Chadwick Boseman – Da 5 Bloods**; Aldis Hodge – One Night in Miami...; Clarke Peters – Da 5 Bloods; Colman Domingo – Ma Rainey's Black Bottom; Glynn Turman – Ma Rainey's Black Bottom | **Phylicia Rashad – Jingle Jangle: A Christmas Journey**; Anika Noni Rose – Jingle Jangle: A Christmas Journey; Gabourey Sidibe – Antebellum; Nia Long – The Banker; Taylour Paige – Ma Rainey's Black Bottom |
| Outstanding International Motion Picture | Outstanding Independent Motion Picture |
| **Night of the Kings (France)**; Ainu Mosir (Japan); His House (United Kingdom); The Last Tree (United Kingdom); The Life Ahead (Italy) | **The Banker**; Emperor; Farewell Amor; Miss Juneteenth; The 24th |
| Outstanding Breakthrough Performance in a Motion Picture | Outstanding Ensemble Cast in a Motion Picture |
| **Madalen Mills – Jingle Jangle: A Christmas Journey**; Dayo Okeniyi – Emperor; Dominique Fishback – Project Power; Jahi Di'Allo Winston – Charm City Kings; Jahzir Bruno – The Witches | **Ma Rainey's Black Bottom**; Da 5 Bloods; Jingle Jangle: A Christmas Journey; Soul; The Banker |
| Outstanding Animated Motion Picture | Outstanding Character Voice Performance – Motion Picture |
| **Soul**; Onward; Over the Moon; Scoob!; Trolls World Tour | **Jamie Foxx – Soul**; Ahmir Khalib Thompson – Soul; Angela Bassett – Soul; Chris Rock – The Witches; Phylicia Rashad – Soul |
| Outstanding Short Form (Live Action) | Outstanding Short Form (Animated) |
| **Black Boy Joy**; Baldwin Beauty; Gets Good Light; Home; & Mrs. Ellis | **Canvas**; Cops and Robbers; Loop; The Power of Hope; Windup |
| Outstanding Breakthrough Creative (Motion Picture) | Outstanding Writing in a Motion Picture |
| **Nadia Hallgren – Becoming**; Loira Limbal – Through the Nigh; Melissa Haizlip – Mr. Soul!; Radha Blank – The Forty-Year-Old Version; Remi Weekes – His House | **Radha Blank – The Forty-Year-Old Version**; David E. Talbert – Jingle Jangle: A Christmas Journey; Kemp Powers – One Night in Miami...; Lee Isaac Chung – Minari; Pete Docter, Kemp Powers, Mike Jones – Soul |

== Television and streaming ==
=== Drama ===
Outstanding Drama Series
**Power Book II: Ghost**; All Rise; Bridgerton; Lovecraft Country; This Is Us
| Outstanding Actor in a Drama Series | Outstanding Actress in a Drama Series |
| **Regé-Jean Page – Bridgerton**; Sterling K. Brown – This Is Us; Jonathan Majors – Lovecraft Country; Keith David – Greenleaf; Nicco Annan – P-Valley | **Viola Davis – How to Get Away with Murder**; Angela Bassett – 9-1-1; Simone Missick – All Rise; Jurnee Smollett – Lovecraft Country; Brandee Evans – P-Valley |
| Outstanding Supporting Actor in a Drama Series | Outstanding Supporting Actress in a Drama Series |
| **Cliff "Method Man" Smith – Power Book II: Ghost**; Delroy Lindo – The Good Fight; Michael Kenneth Williams – Lovecraft Country; Jeffrey Wright – Westworld; J. Alphonse Nicholson – P-Valley | **Mary J. Blige – Power Book II: Ghost**; Lynn Whitfield – Greenleaf; Susan Kelechi Watson – This Is us; Aunjanue Ellis – Lovecraft Country; Adjoa Andoh – Bridgerton |
| Outstanding Directing in a Drama Series | Outstanding Writing in a Drama Series |
| **Hanelle Culpepper — Star Trek: Picard ("Remembrance")**; Cheryl Dunye — Lovecraft Country ("Strange Case"); Misha Green — Lovecraft Country ("Jig-a-Bobo"); Nzingha Stewart — Little Fires Everywhere ("The Uncanny"); Steve McQueen — Small Axe ("Mangrove") | **Attica Locke – Little Fires Everywhere ("The Spider Web")**; Erika L. Johnson & Mark Richard – The Good Lord Bird ("A Wicked Plot"); Jessica Lamour – Little Voice ("Love Hurts"); Katori Hall – P-Valley ("Perpetratin"); Tanya Barfield – Mrs. America ("Shirley") |

=== Comedy ===
Outstanding Comedy Series
**Insecure**; BlackAF; Black-ish; Grown-ish; The Last O.G.
| Outstanding Actor in a Comedy Series | Outstanding Actress in a Comedy Series |
| **Anthony Anderson – Black-ish**; Cedric the Entertainer – The Neighborhood; Don Cheadle – Black Monday; Tracy Morgan – The Last O.G.; Idris Elba – In the Long Run | **Issa Rae – Insecure**; Tracee Ellis Ross – Black-ish; Regina Hall – Black Monday; Folake Olowofoyeku – Bob Hearts Abishola; Yara Shahidi – Grown-ish |
| Outstanding Supporting Actor in a Comedy Series | Outstanding Supporting Actress in a Comedy Series |
| **Deon Cole – Black-ish**; Andre Braugher – Brooklyn Nine-Nine; Jay Ellis – Insecure; Kenan Thompson – Saturday Night Live; Laurence Fishburne – Black-ish | **Marsai Martin – Black-ish**; Tichina Arnold – The Neighborhood; Jenifer Lewis – Black-ish; Natasha Rothwell – Insecure; Yvonne Orji – Insecure |
| Outstanding Directing in a Comedy Series | Outstanding Writing in a Comedy Series |
| **Anya Adams — Black-ish ("Hair Day")**; Aurora Guerrero — Little America ("The Jaguar"); Eric Dean Seaton — Black-ish ("Our Wedding Dre"); Kabir Akhtar — Never Have I Ever ("... started a nuclear war"); Sam Miller, Michaela Coel — I May Destroy You ("Ego Death") | **Michaela Coel — I May Destroy You ("Ego Death")**; Issa Rae — Insecure ("Lowkey Feelin' Myself"); Lee Eisenberg, Emily V. Gordon & Kumail Nanjiani — Little America ("The Rock"); Mindy Kaling & Lang Fisher — Never Have I Ever ("Pilot"); Rajiv Joseph — Little America ("The Manager") |

=== Television movie, limited-series or dramatic special ===
Outstanding Television Movie, Limited-Series or Dramatic Special
**Self Made**; Hamilton; Little Fires Everywhere; Sylvie's Love; The Clark Sisters: First Ladies of Gospel
| Outstanding Actor in a Television Movie, Limited-Series or Dramatic Special | Outstanding Actress in a Television Movie, Limited-Series or Dramatic Special |
| **Blair Underwood – Self Made**; Chris Rock – Fargo; Daveed Diggs – Hamilton; Leslie Odom Jr. – Hamilton; Nnamdi Asomugha – Sylvie's Love | **Octavia Spencer – Self Made**; Aunjanue Ellis – The Clark Sisters: First Ladies of Gospel; Kerry Washington – Little Fires Everywhere; Michaela Coel – I May Destroy You; Tessa Thompson – Sylvie's Love |
| Outstanding Directing in a Television Movie or Special | Outstanding Writing in a Television Movie or Special |
| **Eugene Ashe — Sylvie's Love**; Beyoncé Knowles-Carter, Emmanuel Adeji, Blitz Bazawule & Kwasi Fordjour — Black Is King; Christine Swanson — The Clark Sisters: First Ladies of Gospel; Chuck Vinson & Alan Muraoka — The Power of We: A Sesame Street Special; Kamilah Forbes — Between the World and Me | **Geri Cole — The Power of We: A Sesame Street Special**; Bashir Salahuddin, Diallo Riddle, Emily Goldwyn, Rodney Carter, Rob Haze, Will Miles & Zuri Salahuddin — Sherman's Showcase ("Black History Month Spectacular"); Eugene Ashe — Sylvie's Love; Lin-Manuel Miranda — Hamilton; Sylvia L. Jones & Camille Tucker — The Clark Sisters: First Ladies of Gospel |

=== Television or Motion Picture ===
| Outstanding Writing in a Documentary | Outstanding Directing in a Documentary |
|---|---|
| **Melissa Haizlip – Mr. SOUL!**; Mary Mazzio, A Most Beautiful Thing; Nile Cone, The Beat Don't Stop; Royal Kennedy Rodgers, Hollywood's Architect: The Paul R. Williams Story; Yoruba Richen, Elia Gasull Balada, Valerie Thomas, The Sit-In: Harry Belafonte Hosts the Tonight Show | **Keith McQuirter – By Whatever Means Necessary: The Times of Godfather of Harlem**; Muta'Ali, Yusuf Hawkins: Storm Over Brooklyn; Sam Pollard, Maro Chermayeff, Atlanta's Missing and Murdered: The Lost Children (Ep. 1 & 2); Simcha Jacobovici, Enslaved: The Lost History of the Transatlantic Slave Trade; Yoruba Richen, The Sit-In: Harry Belafonte Hosts the Tonight Show |

=== Overall acting ===
| Outstanding Performance by a Youth (Series, Special, Television Movie or Limited Series) | Outstanding Guest Actor or Actress in a Television Series |
|---|---|
| **Marsai Martin – Black-ish**; Miles Brown – Black-ish; Lexi Underwood – Little Fires Everywhere; Alex R. Hibbert – The Chi; Lyric Ross – This Is Us | **Loretta Devine – P-Valley**; Chris Rock – Saturday Night Live; Issa Rae – Saturday Night Live; Courtney B. Vance – Lovecraft Country; Dave Chappelle – Saturday Night Live |

=== Reality and variety ===
| Outstanding Talk Series | Outstanding Reality Program, Reality Competition Series or Game Show |
|---|---|
| **Red Table Talk**; The Daily Show with Trevor Noah; The Oprah Conversation; The Shop: Uninteruppted; The Tamron Hall Show | **Celebrity Family Feud**; Iyanla: Fix My Life; Shark Tank; United Shades of America with W. Kamau Bell; Voices of Fire |
| Outstanding News / Information – (Series or Special) | Outstanding Host in a Talk or News / Information (Series or Special) |
| **The New York Times Presents "The Killing of Breonna Taylor"**; AM Joy: Remembering John Lewis Special; Desus & Mero: The Obama Interview; The Color of COVID; The ReidOut | **Trevor Noah – The Daily Show with Trevor Noah**; LeBron James – The Shop: Uninterrupted; Don Lemon – CNN Tonight with Don Lemon; Jada Pinkett Smith – Red Table Talk; Joy Reid – The ReidOut |
| Outstanding Variety Show (Series or Special) | Outstanding Host in a Reality, Game Show or Variety (Series or Special) |
| **Verzuz**; 8:46; Black is King; The Fresh Prince of Bel-Air Reunion; Yvonne Orji: Momma I Made It! | **Steve Harvey – Celebrity Family Feud**; Alfonso Ribeiro – America's Funniest Home Videos; Iyanla Vanzant – Iyanla: Fix My Life; W. Kamau Bell – United Shades of America with W. Kamau Bell; RuPaul – RuPaul's Drag Race |

=== Other categories ===
| Outstanding Short-Form Series (Drama or Comedy) | Outstanding Performance in a Short-Form Series |
|---|---|
| **#FreeRayshawn**; CripTales; Lazor Wulf; Mapleworth Murders; Sincerely, Camille | **Laurence Fishburne – #FreeRayshawn**; Giancarlo Esposito – The Broken and the Bad; J.B. Smoove – Mapleworth Murders; Jasmine Cephas Jones – #FreeRayshawn; Stephan James – #FreeRayshawn |
| Outstanding Short-Form Series – Reality/Nonfiction | Outstanding Breakthrough Creative (Television) |
| **Between The Scenes – The Daily Show**; American Masters – Unladylike2020; Benedict Men; In the Making; Inspire Change Series | **Raynelle Swilling – Cherish the Day**; Katori Hall – P-Valley; Keith Knight – Woke; Ramy Youssef – Ramy; Teri Schaffer – Cherish the Day |
| Outstanding Animated Series | Outstanding Children's Program |
| **Doc McStuffins**; Big Mouth; Central Park; She-Ra and the Princesses of Power; Star Trek: Lower Decks | **Family Reunion**; Bookmarks: Celebrating Black Voices; Craig of the Creek; Raven's Home; We Are the Dream: The Kids of the Oakland MLK Oratorical |
Outstanding Character Voice-Over Performance (Television)
**Laya DeLeon Hayes – Doc McStuffins**; Aisha Tyler – Archer; Courtney B. Vance – Hollywood's Architect: The Paul R. Williams Story; Dawnn Lewis – Star Trek: Lower Decks; Deon Cole – Kipo and the Age of Wonderbeasts

== Recording ==
| Outstanding Album | Outstanding New Artist |
|---|---|
| **Chilombo – Jhené Aiko**; Alicia – Alicia Keys; B7 – Brandy; Bigger Love – John Legend; The Wild Card – Ledisi | **Doja Cat – "Say So"**; Chika – "High Rises"; D Smoke – "Black Habits"; Giveon – "When It's All Said and Done"; Skip Marley – "Higher Place" |
| Outstanding Male Artist | Outstanding Female Artist |
| **Drake**; Big Sean; Black Thought; Charlie Wilson; John Legend | **Beyoncé**; H.E.R.; Jazmine Sullivan; Ledisi; Alicia Keys |
| Outstanding Duo, Group or Collaboration (Traditional) | Outstanding Duo, Group or Collaboration (Contemporary) |
| **Chloe x Halle – "Wonder What She Thinks of Me"**; Alicia Keys feat. Jill Scott – "Jill Scott"; Jimmy Jam and Terry Lewis feat. Babyface – "He Don't Know Nothin' Bout It"; Kem feat. Toni Braxton – "Live Out Your Love"; Ledisi and PJ Morton – "Anything For You" | **Megan Thee Stallion feat. Beyoncé – "Savage (Remix)"**; Alicia Keys feat. Khalid – "So Done"; Big Sean feat. Nipsey Hussle – "Deep Reverence"; Chloe x Halle – "Do It"; Jhené Aiko feat. H.E.R. – "B.S." |
| Outstanding Music Video/Visual Album | Outstanding Soundtrack/Compilation Album |
| **"Brown Skin Girl" – Beyoncé, Wizkid, Saint Jhn, Blue Ivy Carter**; "I Can't Breathe" – H.E.R.; "Anything For You"– Ledisi; Black Is King– Beyoncé; "Do It" – Chloe x Halle | **Soul Original Motion Picture Soundtrack – Trent Reznor, Atticus Ross, Jon Batiste and Tom McDougall**; Ma Rainey's Black Bottom (Music from the Netflix Film) – Branford Marsalis; Insecure: Music from the HBO Original Series – Various Artists; Jingle Jangle: A Christmas Journey– Various Artists; The First Ladies of Gospel: The Clark Sisters Biopic Soundtrack – Donald Lawrence |
| Outstanding Gospel/Christian Album | Outstanding Gospel/Christian Song |
| **The Return – The Clark Sisters**; Chosen Vessel – Marvin Sapp; Gospel according to John – PJ Morton; I Am– Koryn Hawthorne; Kierra– Kierra Sheard | **"Touch from You" – Tamela Mann**; "All in His Plan" – PJ Morton; "Never Lost" – CeCe Winans; "Something Has To Break" – Kierra Sheard feat. Tasha Cobbs-Leonard; "Strong God" – Kirk Franklin |
| Outstanding Jazz Album – Instrumental | Outstanding Jazz Album – Vocal |
| **Music From and Inspired By Soul– Jon Batiste**; Be Water– Christian Sands; Omega – Immanuel Wilkins; Reciprocity – George Burton; The Iconoclast– Barry Stephenson | **Holy Room – Live at Alte Oper – Somi**; Donny Duke and Wonder – Nathan Mitchell; Pulling Off The Covers – Mike Phillips; Stronger – Jeff Bradshaw; The Eddy (From The Netflix Original Series) – Various artists |
| Outstanding Soul/R&B Song | Outstanding Hip Hop/Rap Song |
| **"Do It" – Chloe x Halle**; "I Can't Breathe" – H.E.R.; "Anything For You" – Ledisi; "B.S." – Jhené Aiko feat. H.E.R; "Black Parade" – Beyoncé | **"Savage (Remix)" – Megan Thee Stallion feat. Beyoncé**; "Deep Reverence" – Big Sean feat. Nipsey Hussle; "Cool Off" – Missy Elliott; "Laugh Now Cry Later" – Drake feat. Lil Durk; "Life Is Good" – Future feat. Drake |
| Outstanding International Song | Outstanding Producer of the Year |
| **"Lockdown" – Original Koffee**; "Blessed" – Buju Banton; "Pressure (Remix)" – Original Koffee feat. Buju Banton; "Tanana" – Davido feat. Tiwa Savage; "Temptation" – Tiwa Savage | **Hit-Boy**; Donald Lawrence; Jathan Wilson; Sean Keys; TM88 |

== Literary ==
| Outstanding Literary Work – Fiction | Outstanding Literary Work – Nonfiction |
|---|---|
| **"The Awkward Black Man" – Walter Mosley**; "Black Bottom Saints" – Alice Randall; "Lakewood" – Megan Giddings; "Riot Baby" – Tochi Onyebuchi; "The Vanishing Half" – Brit Bennett | **"A Promised Land" – Barack Obama**; "A Black Women's History of the United States" – Daina Ramey Berry; "Driving While Black" – Gretchen Sorin; "Long Time Coming: Reckoning with Race in America" – Michael Eric Dyson; "We're Better Than This" – Elijah Cummings |
| Outstanding Literary Work – Debut Author | Outstanding Literary Work – Biography/Autobiography |
| **"We're Better Than This" – Elijah Cummings**; "A Knock at Midnight" – Brittany Barnett; "Greyboy: Finding Blackness in a White World" – Cole Brown; "Lakewood" – Megan Giddings; "The Compton Cowboys" – Walter Thompson-Hernandez | **"The Dead Are Arising" – Les Payne, Tamara Payne**; "A Most Beautiful Thing: The True Story of America's First All-Black High School Rowing Team" – Arshay Cooper; "A Promised Land" – Barack Obama; "Olympic Pride, American Prejudice" – Deborah Draper; "Willie: The Game-Changing Story of the NHL's First Black Player" – Willie O'Ree |
| Outstanding Literary Work – Instructional | Outstanding Literary Work – Poetry |
| **"Vegetable Kingdom" – Bryant Terry**; "Do Right by Me: Learning to Raise Black Children in White Space" – Valerie Harrison; "Living Lively" – Haile Thomas; "The Black Foster Youth Handbook" – Ángela Quijada-Banks; "The Woman God Created You to Be: Finding Success Through Faith–Spiritually, Personally, and Professionally" – Kimberla Lawson Roby | **"The Age of Phillis" – Honorée Jeffer**; "Homie" – Danez Smith; "Kontemporary Amerikan Poetry" – John Murillo; "Seeing the Body" – Rachel Eliza Griffiths; "Un-American" – Hafizah Geter |
| Outstanding Literary Work – Children | Outstanding Literary Work – Youth/Teens |
| **"She Was the First!: The Trailblazing Life of Shirley Chisholm" – Katheryn Russell-Brown, Eric Velasquez**; "I Promise" – LeBron James, Nina Mata; "Just Like a Mama" – Alice Faye Duncan, Charnelle Pinkney Barlow; "Kamala Harris: Rooted in Justice" – Nikki Grimes, Laura Freeman; "The Secret Garden of George Washington Carver" – Gene Barretta, Frank Morrison | **"Before the Ever After" – Jacqueline Woodson**; "Black Brother, Black Brother" – Jewell Parker Rhodes; "Dear Justyce" – Nic Stone; "Stamped: Racism, Antiracism, and You: A Remix of the National Book Award-winning Stamped from the Beginning" – Jason Reynolds; "This is Your Time" – Ruby Bridges |
