= The Quad (TV series) =

American drama series

- Genre: Drama
- Created by: Felicia D. Henderson; Charles Holland
- Starring: Anika Noni Rose; Ruben Santiago-Hudson; Jazz Raycole; Peyton Alex Smith; Sean Blakemore; Zoe Renee; Babs Proller; Michelle DeFraites; Erica Michelle; Jake Allyn; Larry Rhem; Terayle Hill; E. Roger Mitchell; Jasmine Guy; Katlynn Simone; Miles J Stroter
- Composer: Kurt Farquhar
- Country of origin: United States
- Original language: English
- No. of seasons: 2
- No. of episodes: 19

Production
- Executive producers: Felicia D. Henderson; Charles Holland; Rob Hardy; Will Packer; Mitzi Miller
- Running time: 42 minutes
- Production companies: Rainforest Entertainment; WaterWalk Productions; Capital Arts Entertainment; BET Networks

Original release
- Network: BET
- Release: February 1, 2017 – April 3, 2018

The Quad is an American drama series created by Felicia D. Henderson and Charles Holland that aired on BET. The series premiered on February 1, 2017, with a 2-hour pilot movie. Filming for Season one took place from April 2016 To January 2017 in Atlanta Georgia

The Quad stars Anika Noni Rose as Dr. Eva Fletcher, a newly elected President of the fictional Georgia A&M University. It also stars Ruben Santiago-Hudson, Sean Blakemore and Jasmine Guy. On April 27, 2017, BET renewed the show for a second season, which premiered on January 23, 2018. On April 9, 2018, BET cancelled The Quad due to low ratings.

== Cast and characters ==
=== Main ===
- Anika Noni Rose as Dr. Eva Fletcher, the newly-elected first female president of Georgia A&M University
- Jazz Raycole as Sydney Fletcher, Eva's rebellious daughter who attends Georgia A&M
- Peyton Alex Smith as Cedric Hobbs, a hotheaded hip-hop musician and freshman
- Ruben Santiago-Hudson as Cecil Diamond, Georgia A&M's egocentric band director
- Zoe Renee as Noni Williams, a freshman student and band student
- Michelle DeFraites as Madison Kelly, Sydney’s roommate and Georgia A&M engineering student
- Jake Allyn as Bojohn Folsom, a GAMU transfer and quarterback who faces discrimination for being white at a black college
- Sean Blakemore as Eugene Hardwick, GAMU football coach
- E. Roger Mitchell as Carlton Pettiway A Georgia A&M board member
- Jasmine Guy as Ella Grace Caldwell, A professor at Georgia A&M
- Katlynn Simone as Browyn, Cedric’s girlfriend and Georgia A&M student
- Erica Michelle as Ebonie Weaver, a GAMU student and friend of Cedric
- Miles J Stroter as Junior, a Georgia A&M football player and friend of Bojohn
- Aeja Lee as Tiesha, Junior’s girlfriend and friend of Bojohn
- Redaric Williams as Jason King, A psychology student at Georgia A&M and secret lover of Eva
- Kaye Singleton as Serena Miller, love interest of Cecil
- Demetria McKinney as Bertha Hobbs, Cedric’s mother who lives in Chicago

== Episodes ==
=== Season 1 (2017) ===
No. overall	No. in season	Title	Directed by	Written by	Original release date	US viewers (millions)
1	0	"Pilot"	Rob Hardy	Felicia D. Henderson & Charles D. Holland	February 1, 2017	0.813
2	1	"Elevators" "The Fire Next Time"	Rob Hardy	Felicia D. Henderson	February 8, 2017	0.842
George A&M faces a financial problem.
3	2	"Invisible Man"	Jeffrey Byrd	Charles D. Holland	February 15, 2017	0.744
4	3	"Things Fall Apart"	Jeffrey Byrd	Wendy Coulas	February 22, 2017	0.893
Eva hosts a party for GAMU and introduces jason to sydney. Cedric faces confidence issues.
5	4	"Quicksand"	Rashaad Ernesto Green	Paris Qualles	March 1, 2017	0.788
6	5	"Mulebone"	Michael Allowitz	Jacqueline McKinley & Antonia March	March 8, 2017	0.797
7	6	"Go Tell It on the Mountain"	Mary Lou Belli	Adrian Dukes & Brian Egeston	March 15, 2017	0.784
Sydney returns back home to Connecticut.
8	7	"Their Eyes Were Watching God"	Angela Gomes	Sara Finney-Johnson	March 22, 2017	0.691
9	8	"The Caged Bird Sings"	Eriq La Salle	Teleplay by : Felicia D. Henderson & Charles D. Holland; Story by : Lamont Magee & Andre Edmonds	March 29, 2017	0.865

=== Season 2 (2018) ===
No. overall	No. in season	Title	Directed by	Written by	Original release date	US viewers (millions)
10	1	"In Love and Trouble"	Michael Allowitz	Felicia D. Henderson	January 23, 2018	0.571
11	2	"The Interruption of Everything"	Marta Cunningham	Felicia D. Henderson	January 30, 2018	0.631
12	3	"My Bondage and My Freedom"	Rashaad Ernesto Green	Kevin Arkadie	February 6, 2018	0.550
13	4	"I Am Not Your Negro"	Ruben Santiago-Hudson	Randy Huggins	February 13, 2018	0.669
14	5	"Native Son"	Karen Moncrieff	Sara Finney-Johnson	February 27, 2018	0.469
15	6	"#March"	Mary Lou Belli	Wendy Coulas	March 6, 2018	0.538
16	7	"#MiddlePassage"	Robert Adetuyi	Sara Finney-Johnson & Jazmen Darnell Brown	March 13, 2018	0.539
17	8	"#TheBeautifulStruggle"	Angela Barnes	Randy Huggins	March 20, 2018	0.504
18	9	"#HollerIfYouHearMe"	Benny Boom	Kevin Arkadie & Wendy Coulas	March 27, 2018	0.504
19	10	"#TheColorPurple"	Rashaad Ernesto Green	Felicia D. Henderson & Rose McAleese	April 3, 2018	0.551
Eva’s Fate as president is revealed.

== Critical reception ==
The Quad has received positive reviews from television critics. On Rotten Tomatoes the season has a rating of 100%, based on 5 reviews. On Metacritic, the season has a score of 70 out of 100, based on 6 critics, indicating "generally favorable reviews".
