= Black Summer (TV series) =

American streaming television series

- Genre: Apocalyptic fiction; Drama; Horror; Action
- Created by: Karl Schaefer; John Hyams
- Based on: Z Nation by: Karl Schaefer; Craig Engler
- Starring: Jaime King; Justin Chu Cary; Christine Lee; Sal Velez Jr.; Kelsey Flower; Erika Hau; Gwynyth Walsh; Mustafa Alabssi; Edsson Morales; Zoe Marlett
- Composer: Alec Puro
- Country of origin: United States
- Original language: English
- No. of seasons: 2
- No. of episodes: 16

Production
- Executive producers: Karl Schaefer; John Hyams; Craig Engler; David Rimawi; David Michael Latt; Paul Bales; Abram Cox
- Producers: Jodi Binstock; Steve Graham; Jason Wan Lim; Linda Rogers-Ambury; Jaime King
- Cinematography: Yaron Levy; Spiro Grant
- Editors: Andrew Drazek; Chris Bragg
- Running time: 21–58 minutes
- Production companies: The Asylum; Go2 Digital Media (season 1); Unreality Incorporated (season 1); One Dog Day Productions (season 2)

Original release
- Network: Netflix
- Release: April 11, 2019 – June 17, 2021

Related
- Z Nation

Black Summer is an American zombie apocalypse horror drama television series created by Karl Schaefer and John Hyams. It is a spin-off of Z Nation, serving as a prequel to the series, however with a much darker and less comedic tone. Black Summer ran for two seasons between 2019 and 2021. The first season, consisting of eight episodes, was released on Netflix on April 11, 2019. The series is produced by The Asylum, the same production company behind Z Nation, and is written and directed primarily by Hyams, with Abram Cox writing and directing additional episodes. Jaime King stars in the lead role as Rose, a mother who is separated from her daughter during the earliest and deadliest days of a zombie apocalypse. The series garnered moderate approval from fans and critics. Many of the filming locations are around and within Calgary, Alberta.

In November 2019, Netflix renewed the series for an eight-episode second season, which was released on June 17, 2021.

In April 2023, Schaefer and Hyams stated that the series will not return for a third season.

== Plot ==
During the evacuation of her city amidst the zombie apocalypse, Rose (Jaime King) is separated from her daughter, Anna, and she embarks on a harrowing journey to find her. Thrust alongside a small group of refugees in North America, she must brave a hostile new world and make brutal decisions during the most deadly summer of the apocalypse.

== Cast and characters ==
=== Main ===
- Jaime King as Rose, a mother who is separated from her daughter during the earliest and deadliest days of a zombie apocalypse
- Justin Chu Cary as Julius James, a criminal who took the identity of "Spears", the name of the soldier he killed
- Christine Lee as Ooh "Sun" Kyungsun, a Korean woman who is looking for her missing mother
- Kelsey Flower as Lance (season 1; guest season 2), a young survivor with no family
- Sal Velez Jr as William Velez (season 1), a pole lineman who has a sister and children in Texas
- Erika Hau as Carmen (season 1), (Note: Credited only in the episodes they appeared in.) Manny's girlfriend
- Gwynyth Walsh as Barbara Watson (season 1), a woman who has survived without her husband and is not sure he is alive
- Mustafa Alabssi as Ryan (season 1), a deaf survivor
- Edsson Morales as Manny (season 1), Carmen's boyfriend
- Zoe Marlett as Anna (season 2; recurring season 1), Rose and Patrick's daughter

=== Recurring ===
- Nyren B Evelyn as Earl (season 1), a mysterious survivor who saves Rose and Spears
- Stafford Perry as Phil (season 1), a social Darwinist travelling with Carmen and Manny
- Christian Fraser as Marvin (season 1), a man traveling with Carmen, Manny and Phil
- Nathaniel Arcand as Governale (season 1), a soldier
- Tom Carey as Bronk (season 1), a soldier
- Bobby Naderi as Ray Nazeri (season 2), a former police officer leading his own group
- Manuel Rodriguez-Saenz as Boone (season 2), a talkative man who knows the mountain area
- G. Michael Gray as Freddy (season 2), a man whose family encounters Rose and Anna
- Dakota Daulby as Sonny (season 2), Freddy's aggressive younger brother
- Brenda Robins as Freddy and Sonny's mother (season 2)
- Travis Friesen as Mark (season 2), a man in contact with a plane which drops supplies
- Kumiko Konishi as Rhonda (season 2), Mark’s wife
- Linda Kee as Sophie (season 2), a member of a group in conflict with Nazeri's group who later joins Nazeri
- Jesse Lipscombe as Mance (season 2), a member of Sophie's group
- Chantelle Han as Jase (season 2), a member of Sophie's group
- Elaine Yang as Natalie (season 2) a member of Sophie's group
- Duff Zayonce as Sam (season 2), a member of Nazeri's group who encounters Sophie's group
- Joe Perry as a member of Nazeri's group (season 2)
- Owen Crow Shoe as a member of Sophie's group (season 2)
- Andrew Misle, Cliff Liknes and John Dylan Louie (season 2) as members of another group which comes into conflict with Nazeri

=== Guest ===
- Ty Olsson as Patrick ("Human Flow" season 1), Rose's husband and Anna's father
- Lonni Olson as Ben ("Human Flow" season 1), a man who meets Barbara on the road
- David Haysom as Spears ("Human Flow" season 1), a soldier
- Jerod Blake as Man with AR15 ("Human Flow" season 1), a man with a gun
- Daniel Diemer as Luke ("The Cold" season 2), an acquaintance of Sophie who encounters Lance
- Bechir Sylvain as Braithwaite ("White Horse" season 2), a man who knew Spears before the apocalypse
- James Yi as The Pilot ("The Plane" season 2), the pilot of the plane which drops supplies

== Episodes ==
Season	Episodes	Originally released
1	8	April 11, 2019
2	8	June 17, 2021

=== Season 1 (2019) ===
No. overall	No. in season	Title	Directed by	Written by	Original release date
1	1	"Human Flow"	John Hyams	Karl Schaefer & John Hyams	April 11, 2019
At the onset of the zombie apocalypse, soldiers evacuate people from a suburb to a stadium. Rose, her husband Patrick, and their daughter Anna attempt to evacuate, but only Anna gets on the truck before a flesh wound is found on Patrick. He and another survivor, Sun, are turned away. The trucks leave with Anna, and Patrick later turns. A uniformed soldier bearing the name Spears shoots a zombified Patrick, saving Rose. Ryan, a deaf individual, attempts to help a dying woman, but is pulled away by Sun. Barbara, a woman driving to the stadium, is forced out of her van by a man named Ben until another man named William intervenes. Meanwhile, the dying woman reanimates and begins attacking people. She attacks and eats a man, causing his partner Lance to flee. Spears is revealed to have killed and stolen the clothes of the real Spears, a soldier assigned to guard him. The characters reach a government checkpoint that becomes overrun by civilians, and Sun and Ryan are separated. Sun breaks through the checkpoint and flees ahead of the crowd, which breaches the checkpoint shortly after. Escaping, Sun reaches the van, where she and William get in the van with Barbara and drive away. Other refugees follow the van, leaving behind Rose, Spears, Lance, and Ryan.
2	2	"Drive"	John Hyams	John Hyams	April 11, 2019
Sun, Barbara, and William attempt to travel to the stadium, but encounter resistance from both the living and the dead. They introduce themselves, but end up being chased by a pick-up truck, which they believe wants their fuel. After the truck attempts to run them off the road, both vehicles crash into a stopped semitrailer, killing Barbara and the pick-up truck driver, both of whom reanimate. The surviving occupants escape their vehicles and flee to an abandoned diner while being chased by the now zombified Barbara and pick-up truck driver. Meanwhile, Rose, Spears, Lance, and Ryan continue toward the stadium, witnessing the fates of other survivors along the way.
3	3	"Summer School"	Abram Cox	Abram Cox	April 11, 2019
Rose, Spears, Ryan, and Lance find an abandoned school. Earl, a man wandering outside, does not stop them from entering. The next morning, Spears wants to leave but the others wish to help a child seen running inside the school. One by one, the group gets separated and Ryan is captured by a gang of boys that were hidden in the school. Spears finds Rose and they confront the boys, who have Ryan. Ryan is shot dead and turns, going after Rose and Spears with the kids as spectators. They are rescued by Earl and escape, leaving Lance behind.
4	4	"Alone"	Abram Cox	Abram Cox	April 11, 2019
William and Sun are shown to be trapped in the diner with the passengers of the pick-up truck. Lance wakes up after being knocked out and makes his way through the school. Unable to find his companions, he gets outside using the fire escape on the roof but injures himself on his last jump to the ground. Seeing him escape, the teenage boys execute a captive off the rooftop and allow him to reanimate. The reanimated zombie chases Lance through a business area including a grocery store and public library. A man ends up killing the zombie, but is bitten during the struggle. Lance thanks the man before killing him to keep him from turning.
5	5	"Diner"	John Hyams	John Hyams	April 11, 2019
William, Sun, Carmen, Manny, and Phil are trapped inside the diner while undead Barbara and Marvin, the pick-up truck driver, circle the building. Carmen and Manny tell Sun they know of an outpost with access to weapons which can help them get through downtown to the stadium. Phil and William's first plan to escape using a distraction by Sun while the remaining four attack the two zombies fails and leaves them more agitated than before, forcing everyone back inside. Phil grows desperate and convenes a meeting only with Carmen and Manny, emerging with a new ultimatum to William: sacrifice Sun to the zombies so the rest can escape. William defends Sun and convinces the others that Phil has been hiding a bite on his arm. Everyone turns on Phil and mercilessly beats him. Walking with Earl and Spears, Rose hallucinates her daughter. The trio arrives at the diner and sees the two zombies. As Spears prepares to unload his last two bullets, William drags out a heavily beaten Phil who is swarmed by the zombies. Spears shoots Barbara dead but misses Marvin. Earl, Spears, Sun, Carmen, and Manny kill undead Marvin while William finishes off Phil to prevent reanimation. The larger group sets off in search of weapons.
6	6	"Heist"	Abram Cox	Abram Cox	April 11, 2019
Two soldiers observe the group arriving at a trap house. A guard stops Rose, Manny and Carmen. Rose is separated from the group, and left in the same room as an incapacitated Lance where she is eventually assaulted by a guard. Concurrently, Manny and Carmen overpower a guard and let the rest of the group inside, where they find a stash of firearms. Sun and Manny make their way into the air duct system. William disables the electricity, and Carmen stabs another guard in the neck to turn him undead. The guard reanimates and begins attacking the residents. Manny is killed by stray bullets, reanimates, and chases Sun. Spears saves Sun through the air ducts. When the power goes out, Rose takes the opportunity to escape with Lance. Once outside, they reunite with Earl.
7	7	"The Tunnel"	John Hyams	Daniel Schaefer	April 11, 2019
Amidst the chaos, the group reunites. Just as they are cornered by zombies, the two soldiers seen in the previous episode kill the zombies and offer to lead the survivors to the stadium. William reveals that he has suffered a leg injury, and is forced to limp. They stop to rest in a hall for the night. During the night, the soldiers lead Spears away through a tunnel. Rose follows and learns Spears' true identity. After discovering the soldiers' true motives and knowing the group's need for their weapons, she kills them and spares Spears, who stays with the group. In the morning, they arm themselves and head out. Earl is reunited with his dog and leaves the group behind without saying a word.
8	8	"The Stadium"	John Hyams	John Hyams	April 11, 2019
The group arrives on the outskirts of the stadium along with other survivors. Zombies follow and gunfire commences. Carmen is killed in the crossfire and reanimates. During the mayhem, Rose and William are separated from the group, the gathering is bombed as the survivors attempt to fend off the attackers. Lance is separated from Sun and Spears and flees from a pack of zombies. The others reunite, and Rose kills William, per his request, due to his leg injury leaving him unable to walk any longer. Entering the empty stadium with Sun and Spears, Rose sees her daughter who runs towards her.

=== Season 2 (2021) ===
No. overall	No. in season	Title	Directed by	Written by	Original release date
9	1	"The Cold"	John Hyams	John Hyams	June 17, 2021
Lance is shown fleeing from a zombie, before letting a seemingly pregnant woman named Sophie into his car. She opens his door, allowing another man named Luke to kill him. Shot in the neck and tossed on the road, Lance turns and attacks them, continually chasing Luke. Four months later, Rose and Anna are shown living in a fortified house on a snowy mountain, and kill both the living and the dead that approach them. Another hostile group in the mountains has captured a few people, including Sun, and interrogate a man about a plane that drops supplies and a house that is fortified. They are attacked by another group and many people are killed in the gunfight, though the leader of the group escapes on a snowmobile with a few of his men and Sun. Spears is shown in a forest, injured. Another man named Freddy has encountered Rose and Anna, and tries to get them to trust him. Luke, revealed to be a veteran, temporarily escapes from Lance, and is refused help from other survivors in the area. He eventually manages to start a car, but is once again attacked by Lance.
10	2	"Prelude"	Abram Cox	Karl Schaefer & Daniel Schaefer	June 17, 2021
Officer Ray Nazeri, the leader of the hostile group is shown escaping from his zombified family while their neighborhood is evacuated. Anna tricks two men looting a store into letting her in, from where she lets Rose, Spears and Sun in, and they force the men out and loot the store themselves. The group continues on their way, where they find a crashed car and Sun finds an injured man, who she helps. They are attacked by a group of men in trucks, Sun and Spears are separated from Rose and Anna who regroup with them only to find Spears shot. Rose and Anna flee, while Sun throws Spears down an embankment to protect him, before she is captured by the group, led by Nazeri. A man attempts to help an injured friend in the mountains, and they talk about getting to a plane, only for his friend to die, turn, and begin chasing him. Sophie, having survived, joins another group. Spears, still injured, travels through the mountains, eventually finding a group of dead bodies, and takes the gloves from one of them. Rose and Anna arrive at the house, but find a zombie outside. After failing to kill it, they distract it and make it to the door, where they are allowed in by a group of people living there, which includes Freddy.
11	3	"Card Game"	John Hyams	Sarah Sellman	June 17, 2021
Rose and Anna meet the residents of the house, including Freddy, his aggressive younger brother Sonny, and their mother. Another resident, Mark, shown to be the interrogated man from "The Cold", reveals he is in contact with the group in control of the plane, and leaves to pick up the most recent supply drop. When he does not return before dark, Sonny forces Mark’s wife Rhonda to contact him. She and Freddy try to call him by radio, but it fails, and Rhonda discovers her axe missing. When the house becomes cold, Freddy's family forces him to go outside and get wood for a fire. He does, but is attacked by the zombie and forced up a tree. While waiting, Sonny grows more unhinged, and eventually kills Rhonda when he believes he heard her talking to someone on the radio. Rhonda turns and kills another resident, and Rose kills both infected after Sonny and his mother fail to. Later, Sonny hears a transmission come in on the radio upstairs, however ends up destroying it out of frustration after he cannot communicate with the person on the other end. His mother accuses Rose and Anna of taking the rations, and Rose kills her, while Anna kills Sonny. Another man is shown to be in the house, having taken the axe.
12	4	"Cold War"	Abram Cox	Abram Cox	June 17, 2021
Sun and the others are found by the survivors of their group, and they approach the house and kill the zombie outside. They attempt to get into the house, but the ones inside resist. Sophie's group arrives at the house, and a three way fight ensues. Several people are killed, including Freddy, while Rose and Anna are hidden by the man in the house, who tells them he works on planes and can get them to the airstrip the plane will land at. They leave the house with him at gunpoint. Sun witnesses Nazeri kill one of his own after he is attacked by a zombie and claims he was not bitten, and attempts to escape, but is caught again by Nazeri after meeting Sophie and witnessing the plane drop two packages.
13	5	"White Horse"	John Hyams	Henry G.M. Jones	June 17, 2021
Spears encounters a man named Braithwaite who claims to recognize him, though cannot remember his name. After failing to kill a man riding a horse, they find and kill a zombie, and find a gun, liquor, and supplies they use to start a fire. That night, after Spears mentions he has a nut allergy, Braithwaite remembers that he is "Big James'" little brother, and claims he knew him by working for him. They reminisce about Big James, but it ends in a fight after Braithwaite asks to check if Spears is injured. During a rainstorm, after Braithwaite determines Spears' wound is infected, and tells Spears they are heading to a cabin where they can survive. The next morning, Spears remembers that he shot Braithwaite twice to kill him, presumably on his brother's orders, and Braithwaite brings up the idea of "bygones". Spears brings up a gun to shoot him, but instead lets him walk away to the horse, which has arrived, now riderless.
14	6	"Currency"	Abram Cox	Jen Derwingson-Peacock	June 17, 2021
The surviving members of Sophie's group find one of the crates dropped by the plane, and encounter a member of Nazeri's group named Sam, who agrees to split the food within fairly. Nazeri, Sophie, Sun and another man find the second crate, containing weapons, which Nazeri claims for themselves after three other men show up. Rose, Anna and the other man head for the airfield, and the man tells them he knows of a place they can rest the night. When he is unable to find it, Rose decides he was lying about it and attempts to execute him, but is unable to do so with Anna watching. While looting, the other group kills the other man, and they get into a standoff which Sun tries to defuse. After they are attacked by zombies, Sun gives the other group some of the weapons and they depart, causing Nazeri to release her. The other group struggles to get the crate up the mountain, and some of them eventually give up, causing the crate, along with Sam and another member, to fall back down the hill and break. Sam breaks his leg, and is attacked by the other member, who was killed by the fall and zombified. Rose, Anna and the man eventually arrive at the place, shown to be a ski lodge.
15	7	"The Lodge"	John Hyams	Abram Cox	June 17, 2021
Rose, Anna and the man, Boone, arrive at the ski lodge and decide to spend the night. Anna keeps watch, and finds the door open. She closes it, but later finds another open door, and follows a sound to a sealed room containing infected. The next morning, Rose finds Anna with the person who entered, Spears. The group eats, and contemplate staying or going to the airstrip, and Anna eventually reveals Spears is dying. When Anna leaves to deal with the zombies in the other room, Rose tells Spears her only mission is to protect her daughter, and does not regret abandoning him. She leaves to check on dessert, and returns to find Anna has shot Spears. They leave for the airstrip, but Boone runs away from them. A flashback reveals Spears, knowing he was dying and unable to commit suicide, asked Anna to kill him, and she obliged.
16	8	"The Plane"	Abram Cox	Karl Schaefer	June 17, 2021
Rose and Anna arrive at the airfield and encounter Boone, now a zombie, who attacks them. The remaining members of the other group, including Mance arrive, but are all killed and zombified, except Mance. Rose and Anna meet Nazeri, Sophie and Sun, and attempt to bargain with them, before they are attacked and chased into a hangar by the zombies. The group that met Nazeri's in the mountains joined two former members of Nazeri's group, captured Boone, and killed him to turn him and slow down anyone else coming. In the hangar, Rose and Nazeri's groups are captured by the others, who reveal they will take two of them along on the plane. They beat Nazeri, but he fights back and injures one of them. The leader has Anna get a first aid kit, and she returns with a flare gun she gives Rose. The zombies break in, and the women and Nazeri manage to escape and lock their attackers inside. Nazeri holds the others at gunpoint and admonishes them for not listening to him, but as he is about to kill them, they witness the plane land. Rose causes an explosion with the flare gun, injuring her leg, while Nazeri, the closest to the explosion, is incapacitated. Rose sends the others to the plane, intending to shoot herself, but is unable to. The others make for the plane, but the zombies break out of the hangar and pursue them, killing Sophie. Anna refuses to board the plane, instead running away. Sun gets on the plane, and it leaves. Mance distracts the zombies from Anna, and manages to kill all of them with pieces of debris, before taking a gun and killing the zombified Boone. Rose and Nazeri end up in a standoff, but Anna arrives. Seeing Rose alive, she gets in a car and brings it to the others, but Rose does not get in. On the plane, the pilot is shown to speak Korean, and communicates with Sun, telling her they are going far, and all that matters is now.

== Production ==
=== Development ===
On July 19, 2018, it was reported that Netflix had given an 8-episode, straight-to-series order for a "spin-off" prequel series to Syfy's Z Nation, titled Black Summer. The series was created by Z Nation co-creator and executive producer Karl Schaefer alongside the flagship series' co-executive producer John Hyams. Schaefer and Hyams also serve as showrunners for the prequel series.

On November 20, 2019, the series was renewed for a second season consisting of eight episodes.

Following the second season's release, Netflix did not confirm the show's status. In April 2023, it was confirmed by Schaefer and Hyams that a third season would not be happening, indicating Black Summer is canceled.

=== Casting ===
Alongside the series' order in July 2018, Jaime King was confirmed to star in the lead role. On July 29, King announced via her Instagram account that Justin Chu Cary would portray a character named Spears. On August 7, Kelsey Flower revealed that he had joined the cast as Lance and described his character as "the guy that's terrible at the Apocalypse. You'd think he'd be the first to die." On August 16, Gwynyth Walsh and Christine Lee were reported to have joined the cast in undisclosed roles. On October 13, it was reported that deaf Syrian refugee Mustafa Alabssi had been cast as Ryan, a deaf character.

=== Writing ===
At the 2018 San Diego Comic-Con, Schaefer noted that "Black Summer is before the apocalypse got weird and was just scary." He said that the horror series is not intended to be the funny version of The Walking Dead that Z Nation is, but would instead be more of an "old-school" take on zombie lore. This was echoed by producer Jodi Binstock, who stated that the series is "not tongue-in-cheek, it's very very serious: it's as if the zombie apocalypse really happened in 2018 and explores what that would be for all of us."

As the series does not feature any of the characters from Z Nation, Binstock later distanced the series from the "spin-off" label, explaining that "Black Summer is referred to in Z Nation as the summer where everything went to hell, so that is where Black Summer picks up." Elaborating, Schaefer described the events of Black Summer as "the low point of the apocalypse" and established it as taking place "about four months into the apocalypse, [...] when 95% of the population dies over the course of the summer." Within that context, Hyams stated that the "essence" of the story is about a mother being separated from her daughter. "The story is: what would a mother do to find her child? And what we learn is that she would do anything." Hyams, who wrote the majority of the series' episodes, also said that the series would explore the idea of an American refugee crisis. Schaefer, Abram Cox, and Daniel Schaefer will also write episodes for the series.

Schaefer stated that the series is not going to be episodic, but will instead be an 8-hour "chunk" to work through. This was confirmed by Binstock, who added that Black Summer would employ "a completely different approach" than Z Nation, "in that it's much more like a chapter in a book. You don't necessarily do the cliffhangers on a commercial break – it's keeping you going so that you've got to binge it."

=== Filming ===
Production for the first season had officially commenced by July 23, 2018 in and around Calgary, Alberta, with filming partially taking place at Queen Elizabeth High School, Stampede Park, McMahon Stadium and under the Calgary Tower. The series continued production in the smaller communities of Irricana, Beiseker and Cochrane before returning to Calgary in mid-to-late September. On September 26, it was reported that King had been hospitalized for three days due to injuries sustained while on set, with King simultaneously confirming that production for the series had wrapped. John Hyams directed the majority of the series' episodes. Abram Cox will also serve as a director on the series.

=== Connection to Z Nation ===
The connection between Black Summer and its parent series took a similar approach as the original relationship between Fear the Walking Dead and The Walking Dead, as there were no plans for any of the characters from Z Nation to appear in the companion prequel series. Z Nation actor DJ Qualls revealed at San Diego Comic-Con that the Syfy series takes place "quite a long time" after the events of Black Summer, making him feel that the cast is "too old" for a crossover to work. The series do share "most to all of [their] writing, directing, and producing staff" as well as a production company, The Asylum. The show's starring actress, Jaime King, said that the two series have "nothing to do with" each other.

== Reception ==
=== Season 1 ===
On Rotten Tomatoes, the first season holds an approval rating of 70% based on 20 reviews, with an average rating of 6.1/10. The website's critical consensus reads, "Black Summer has enough undead carnage and a sinewy pace to please zombie fans, but the series suffers from scant characterization and doesn't add much storytelling meat to the genre's gnawed-on bone."

Horror writer Stephen King praised Black Summer, stating: "Just when you think there's no more scare left in zombies, THIS comes along. Existential hell in the suburbs, stripped to the bone." The New York Times wrote, “If Andrei Tarkovsky and John Carpenter had teamed up to direct a zombie show, it might have looked something like this formally daring Netflix series.” In April 2019, Black Summer was the most watched show on Netflix in the United Kingdom.

=== Season 2 ===
The second season has a Rotten Tomatoes rating of 100% based on 8 reviews, with an average rating of 7.5/10.
