= Jasmine Cephas Jones =

British actress (born 1989)

- Jones in 2026
- Born: 21 August 1989 (age 37); London, England
- Education: Berklee College of Music; Neighborhood Playhouse School of the Theatre
- Occupations: Actress; singer
- Years active: 2013–present
- Parents: Ron Cephas Jones (father); Kim Lesley (mother)

Jasmine Cephas Jones (/ˈsiːfəs/; born 21 July 1989) is an English actress and singer. The daughter of actor Ron Cephas Jones, she studied acting at the Neighborhood Playhouse School of the Theatre. She has received a Grammy Award and Emmy Award.

She gained her breakthrough when she made her Broadway debut originating the dual roles of Peggy Schuyler and Maria Reynolds in the Lin-Manuel Miranda stage musical Hamilton (2015–2016). Her work on Hamilton's accompanying cast album earned her a Grammy Award for Best Musical Theater Album. Her performance was captured in the Disney+ live stage recording released in 2020.

On film, she acted in the films Mistress America (2015), Monsters and Men (2018), The Photograph (2020) and Origin (2023). She played a caring mother in the drama film Blindspotting (2018) and its spin-off sequel series of the same name from 2021 to 2023, on which she also served as a producer. She also took roles in Girls (2017), Mrs. Fletcher (2019), and FreeRayshawn (2020), the latter earning her the Primetime Emmy Award for Outstanding Actress in a Short Form Comedy or Drama Series.

== Early life and education ==
Jasmine Cephas Jones was born on 21 July 1989 in London, England but grew up in Midwood, Brooklyn. She is the daughter of actor Ron Cephas Jones (1957–2023), who was of African American heritage, and British-born jazz singer Kim Lesley, who is white.

She attended Fiorello H. LaGuardia High School of Music & Art and Performing Arts, and Berklee College of Music, and graduated from Neighborhood Playhouse School of the Theatre in 2011.

== Career ==
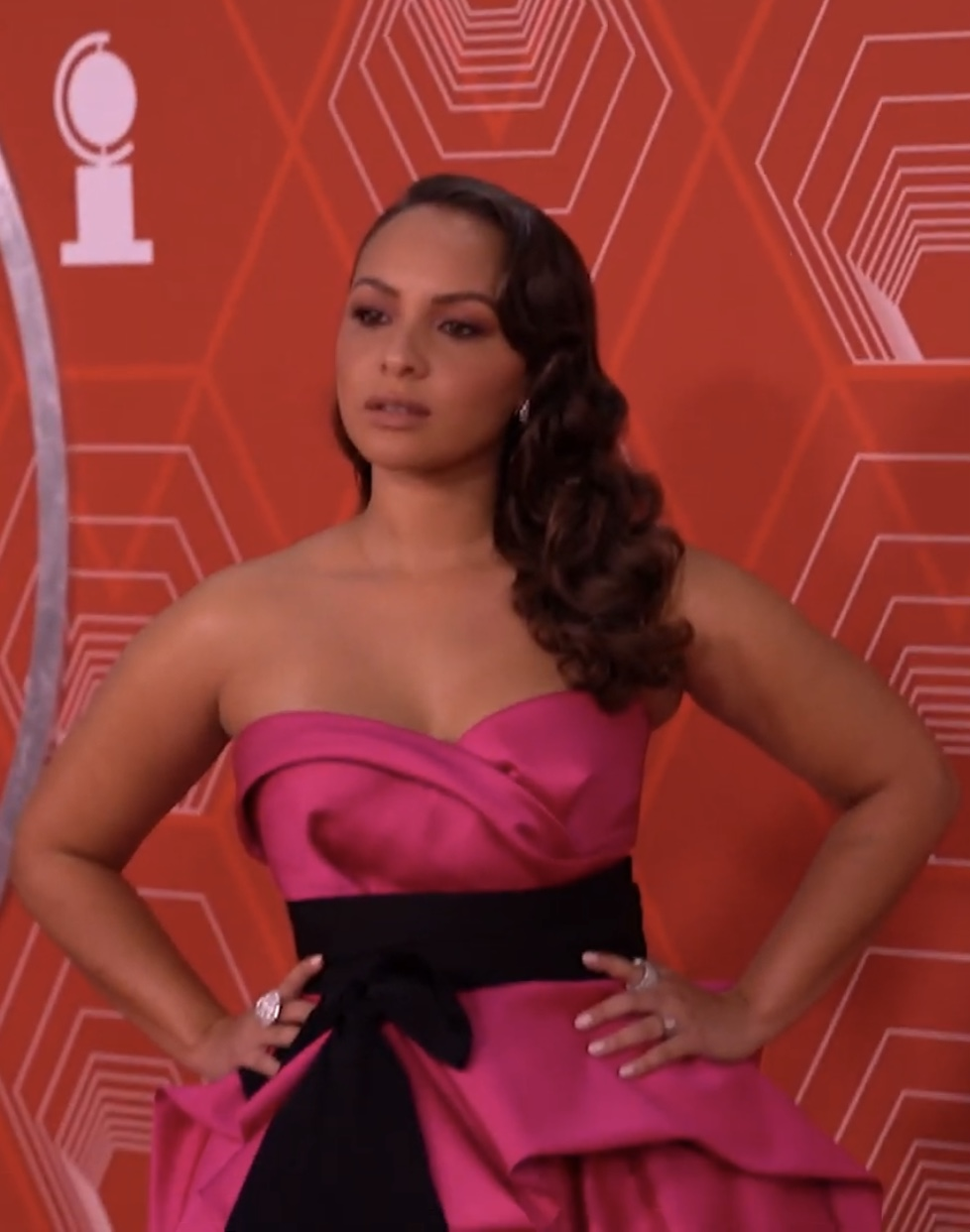
Jones attending the 74th Tony Awards in New York City.

Jones has made small appearances in multiple independent films, including Titus (2013) and Fairfield (2014). She has also appeared in episodes of Blue Bloods, Unforgettable, and Mrs. Fletcher.

In 2015, she originated the roles of Maria Reynolds and Peggy Schuyler in the original Off-Broadway production of Hamilton. When the show moved to Broadway, she continued in those roles, and remained with that production until December 8, 2016. In 2016, she won a Grammy Award for her work as one of the principal soloists on the Hamilton cast album. She has solos in "The Schuyler Sisters" and "Say No To This". At Super Bowl LI, she, along with Hamilton castmates Renée Elise Goldsberry and Phillipa Soo, sang "America the Beautiful".

Jones also appears in the 2015 film Mistress America, the 2018 film Dog Days, and the critically acclaimed 2018 film Blindspotting. In 2020, she appeared as a secondary character in the short series #FreeRayshawn, winning an Emmy for her performance as Tyisha. Jones' 2020 Emmy win made history both alongside her father Ron Cephas Jones for being the first father-daughter duo to win Emmy Awards in the same year, and as the first-ever Black woman to win in the Outstanding Actress in a Short Form Comedy or Drama Series category.

Following the positive response to the Blindspotting film, cable and streaming network Starz along with Lionsgate Television, Snoot Entertainment, and Dreams With Friends Inc., ordered a spin-off series following the events of the film. The series set Jones to lead the cast, reprising her role as Ashley for the series as it focuses on her character. The series also set Jones as a producer, giving her a first producing credit. Blindspotting premiered on 13 June 2021 and was renewed for a second season by Starz on 14 October 2021.

On 13 July 2021, Jones and her father Ron Cephas Jones announced the 2021 Primetime Emmy nominees on behalf of the Television Academy. On October 25, 2021, it was announced that Jones had signed with Creative Artists Agency (CAA) for representation. Jones plays the role of Swan on the 2024 concept album Warriors by Lin-Manuel Miranda and Eisa Davis.

== Personal life ==
On 24 December 2018, Cephas Jones became engaged to fellow Hamilton original Broadway cast member Anthony Ramos, whom she met and began dating in 2014 during rehearsals for the original Off-Broadway production of Hamilton at The Public Theatre. It was reported that the couple split in November 2021.

== Acting credits ==
=== Film ===
Year	Title	Role	Notes
2013	Titus	Jessica	
2014	Fairfield	Lindsey	
2015	Mistress America	Nicolette	
2018	Blindspotting	Ashley Rose	
2018	Monsters and Men	Marisol Ortega	
2018	Dog Days	Lola	
2019	Marriage Story	Theater Actor	
2020	The Photograph	Rachel Miller	
2020	Hamilton	Peggy Schuyler / Maria Reynolds	
2020	Honest Thief	Beth Hall	
2022	Erax	Auntie Opal	Short
2023	Origin	Elizabeth Davis	

=== Television ===
Year	Title	Role	Notes
2013	Blue Bloods	Shania Costa	Episode: "Justice Served"
2014	Unforgettable	Ellen	Episode: "East of Islip"
2016	Odd Mom Out	TKTS Seller	Episode: "Hamming It Up"
2017	Girls	Paget	Episodes: "Full Disclosure", "The Bounce"
2018	Midnight, Texas	Addie Wigget	Episodes: "Patience is a Virtue", "Yasss, Queen"
2019	Mrs. Fletcher	Chloe	5 episodes
2020	#FreeRayshawn	Tyisha	15 episodes
2021–2023	Blindspotting	Ashley Rose	16 episodes; also producer
2026	Lanterns	Bernadette Stewart	Recurring role

=== Theatre ===
Year	Production	Role	Type
2014	The Loneliness of the Long Distance Runner	Kenisha	Off-Broadway
2015	Hamilton	Peggy Schuyler / Maria Reynolds	Off-Broadway
2015–2016	Hamilton	Peggy Schuyler / Maria Reynolds	Broadway
2019	Cyrano	Roxanne	Off-Broadway
2026	2:22 A Ghost Story	Jenny	Off-Broadway
2027	Warriors	Swan	Broadway

=== Music videos ===
Year	Title	Artist
2019	"Mind Over Matter"	Anthony Ramos
2019	"Moonlight"	Jasmine Cephas Jones
2020	"Little Bird"	Jasmine Cephas Jones
2024	"Brighter" ft. Kevin Garrett	Jasmine Cephas Jones, Kevin Garrett
2024	"Baby I Can't Give You Up"	Jasmine Cephas Jones

== Discography ==
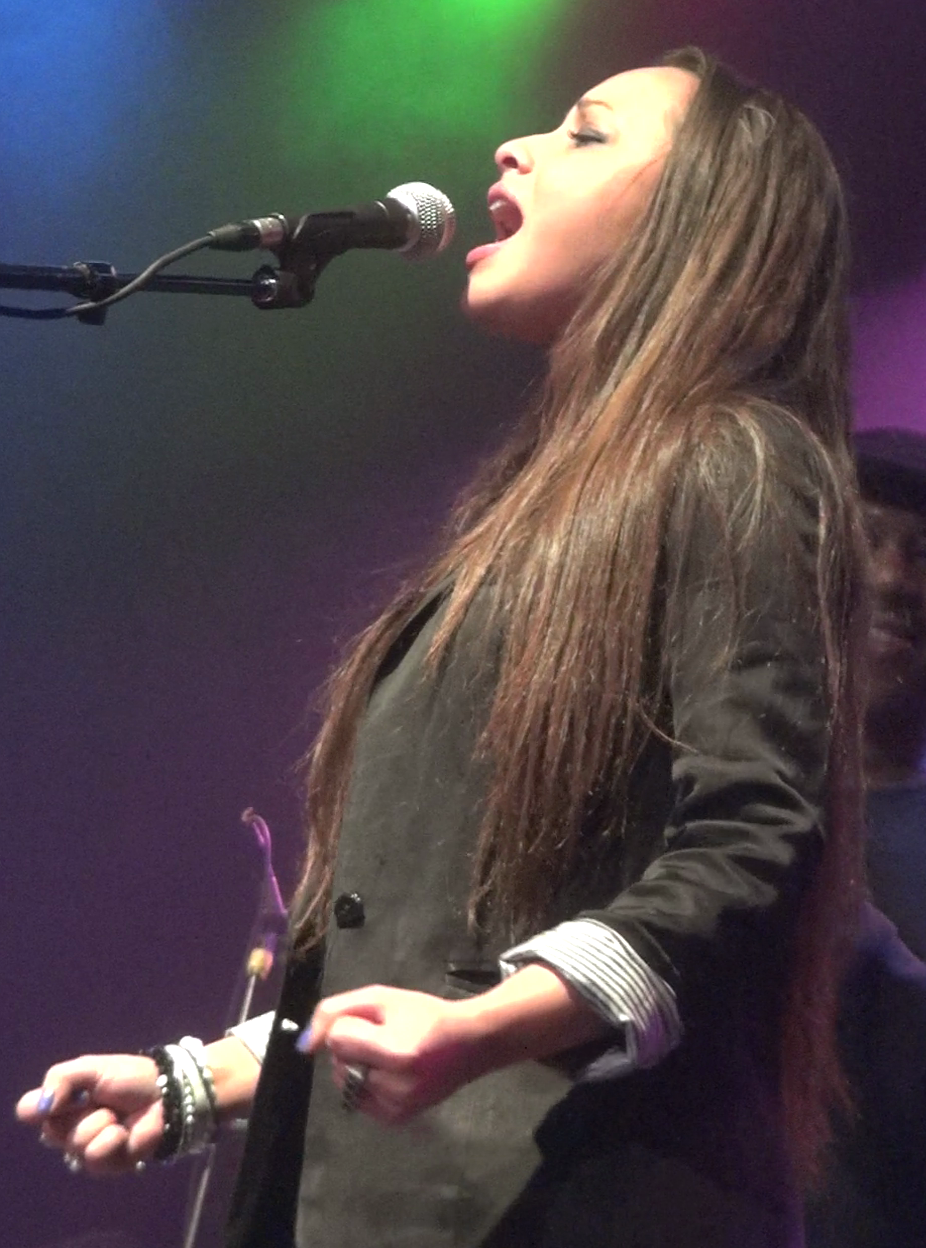
Jones performing at the Million Man Mosh in 2012

=== Albums ===
Title	Year
Phoenix	2024

=== Extended plays ===
Title	Year
Blue Bird	2020

=== Singles ===
Title	Year	Album/EP
"Moonlight"	2019	Blue Bird
"Wild Thing"	2020	Blue Bird
"Little Bird"	2020	Blue Bird
"Wild Thing Remix" ft. Daveed Diggs	2021	Non-album single
"Brighter" ft. Kevin Garrett	2024	Phoenix
"Baby I Can't Give You Up"	2024	Phoenix

=== Guest appearances ===
Title	Year	Other artist(s)	Album
"Freedom"	2018	Anthony Ramos, Broken Luxury	The Freedom EP
"What's Going On"	2020	Devon Gilfillian	What's Going On

=== Soundtrack and cast album appearances ===
Album	Year	Role
Hamilton (Original Broadway Cast Recording)	2015	Peggy Schuyler/Maria Reynolds
Blindspotting (Music from the STARZ Original Series, Season 1)	2021	Ashley Rose
Blindspotting (Music from the STARZ Original Series, Season 2)	2023	Ashley Rose
Warriors	2024	Swan

== Awards and nominations ==
Year	Award	Date of ceremony	Category	Work	Result	Ref(s)
2016	Broadway.com Audience Awards	May 10, 2016	Favorite Featured Actress in a Musical	Hamilton	Nominated	
2016	Broadway.com Audience Awards	May 10, 2016	Favorite Female Breakthrough Performance	Hamilton	Nominated	
2016	Grammy Awards	February 15, 2016	Best Musical Theater Album	Hamilton	Won	
2019	Imagen Awards	August 10, 2019	Best Actress – Feature Film	Monsters and Men	Nominated	
2020	Antonyo Awards	June 19, 2020	Best Featured Actor in a Musical Off-Broadway	Cyrano	Won	
2020	Primetime Emmy Awards	September 17, 2020	Outstanding Actress in a Short Form Comedy or Drama Series	#FreeRayshawn	Won	
2021	NAACP Image Awards	March 27, 2021	Outstanding Performance in a Short-Form Series	#FreeRayshawn	Nominated	
2021	Women's Image Awards	October 14, 2021	Outstanding Actress in a Comedy Series	Blindspotting	Nominated	
2021	Film Independent Spirit Awards	March 6, 2022	Best Female Performance in a New Scripted Series	Blindspotting	Nominated	
2022	NAMIC Vision Awards	April 27, 2022	Best Performance – Comedy	Blindspotting	Nominated	
2022	Hollywood Critics Association TV Awards	August 14, 2022	Best Actress in a Broadcast Network or Cable Series, Comedy	Blindspotting	Nominated	
2024	Hollywood Critics Association TV Awards	January 8, 2024	Best Actress in a Broadcast Network or Cable Series, Comedy	Blindspotting	Nominated	
