= Justin Chu Cary =

American actor

- Born: September 19, 1982 (age 43); Oakland, California
- Occupations: Actor, artist
- Years active: 2008-present

Justin Chu Cary is an American actor who stars on Netflix's Black Summer. The series is a prequel to Z Nation.

== Early life and career ==
Justin Chu Cary grew up in Oakland, California, the son of an African-American father and a Chinese-American mother. He went to the University of California, Davis where he competed for track and field and ran the 800M and 4x400M relays after being a 3 sport athlete at Berkeley High School.

After working in theater in Los Angeles, as well as appearing in a few television series, he was cast on the Netflix series Black Summer. He is also a graphic designer and comic book artist.

== Filmography ==
=== Films ===
Year	Film	Role	Notes
2008	The Other Way Round	Ben	Short
2009	Straight Talk: The Truth About Teen Pregnancy	Chris	Short
2009	Midnight Ride	Ollie	Short
2011	Naomi	Dad	Short
2014	Old Soul	Bartender	TV movie
2018	Blindspotting	Tin	
2018	Tokyo Ghoul	Dr. Kanou	Short
2022	As They Made Us	Jay	
2024	Final Heist	Liev	Tubi Movie

=== Television ===
Year	Title	Role	Notes
2009	Lost Tapes	Tyler Crenshaw	Episode: "White River Monster"
2011	Love That Girl!	8 Pack Man	Episode: "A Fool for You"
2012	Ringer	Walter	Episode: "Maybe We Can Get a Dog Instead?"
2012	Days of Our Lives	Karim	Regular Cast
2014	NCIS	Staff Sergeant Martin "Shooter" Roe	Episode: "Shooter"
2015	Review	Mike	Episode: "Buried Alive, 6 Star Review, Public Speaking"
2015	Supergirl	Guard #1	Episode: "Stronger Together"
2015	Faking It	Supervisor	Episode: "School's Out"
2015	HTMAST	James	Episode: "I'm Good" & "Market Research"
2016	Colony	Checkpoint Home Security Officer	Episode: "Pilot"
2016	Scorpion	Bartender	Episode: "Sun of a Gun"
2016	Jane the Virgin	Guy #1	Episode: Chapter Thirty-Two
2016	We Are Fathers	Kevin	Recurring cast
2016	Game Shakers	Lumpy	Episode: Babe's Bench
2017	Lucifer	Benson Reeves	Episode: "Welcome Back, Charlotte Richards"
2017	Major Crimes	Manny	Episode: "Conspiracy Theory: Part 4"
2018	S.W.A.T.	Devin	Episode: "Crews"
2019	Quarantine	Ever	Recurring cast
2019-21	Black Summer	Spears	Main cast
2021	Blindspotting	Rob	Recurring cast
