= Blindspotting (TV series) =

American comedy-drama television series

- Genre: Comedy drama
- Created by: Rafael Casal & Daveed Diggs
- Based on: Blindspotting
- Starring: Jasmine Cephas Jones; Jaylen Barron; Candace Nicholas-Lippman; Benjamin Earl Turner; Atticus Woodward; Rafael Casal
- Music by: Ambrose Akinmusire; Michael Yezerski
- Country of origin: United States
- Original language: English
- No. of seasons: 2
- No. of episodes: 16

Production
- Executive producers: Rafael Casal; Daveed Diggs; Jess Wu Calder; Keith Calder; Ken Lee; Tim Palen; Emily Gerson Saines; Seith Mann
- Producers: Jasmine Cephas Jones; Chrisann Verges; Michele Greco
- Cinematography: Tarin Anderson
- Editors: Craig Hayes; Varun Viswanath; S. Robyn Wilson; Chris Chandler; Trevor Penna; Paul Ero Jr.
- Running time: 30–34 minutes
- Production companies: Dreams with Friends Inc.; Snoot Entertainment; Lionsgate Television

Original release
- Network: Starz
- Release: June 13, 2021 – May 26, 2023

Blindspotting is an American comedy drama television series and a spin-off sequel of the 2018 film. Set six months after the events of the film, the series follows Ashley, who is forced to move in with the mother of Miles, her boyfriend and father of her son, after he is suddenly incarcerated. The series co-stars Jaylen Barron, Candace Nicholas-Lippman, Benjamin Earl Turner, and Atticus Woodward.

The series was created and executive produced by Rafael Casal and Daveed Diggs, writers, producers and lead stars of the original film, with Casal also acting as showrunner. Keith Calder, a producer on the original film, is also an executive producer, as well as actress Jasmine Cephas Jones. It premiered on June 13, 2021 on Starz. In October 2021, the series was renewed for a second season which premiered on April 14, 2023. In September 2023, the series was canceled after two seasons.

== Plot ==
Six months after the events in the film of the same name, Miles, Ashley's partner of 12 years and father of their son, is suddenly incarcerated, and the situation leaves her to navigate a chaotic and humorous existential crisis when she and her son Sean are forced to move in with Miles' mother and half-sister.

== Cast ==
=== Main ===
- Jasmine Cephas Jones as Ashley Rose
- Jaylen Barron as Trish
- Candace Nicholas-Lippman as Janelle
- Benjamin Earl Turner as Earl
- Atticus Woodward as Sean
- Rafael Casal as Miles (season 2; recurring season 1)

=== Recurring ===
- Helen Hunt as Rainey
- Justin Chu Cary as Rob
- April Absynth as Jacque Basco
- Margo Hall as Nancy
- Andrew Chapelle as Scotty
- Lil Buck as Buck
- Jon Boogz as Boogz
- Anthony Ramos as Yorkie
- Lance Cameron Holloway as Cuddie
- Leland Orser as Carl
- Daveed Diggs as Collin
- Katlynn Simone Smith as Teena (season 2)
- Tamera Tomakili as June (season 2)
- Chase Williamson as Mikey (season 2)
- Tim Chantarangsu as Freddy (season 2)

=== Guest stars ===
- Utkarsh Ambudkar as Niles Turner
- Blake Anderson as Date
- LeVar Burton as Earl's father (season 2)
- Susan Park as Kim (season 1)
- Stephen Root as Rick (season 1)
- E-40 as himself (season 2)
- P-Lo as himself (season 2)
- Too $hort as himself (season 2)
- Dante Basco as Dante Basco, Jacque's father and a version of himself
- Joe Taslim as Mustafa (season 2)

== Episodes ==
=== Series overview ===
Season	Episodes	Originally released	
Season	Episodes	First released	Last released
1	8	June 13, 2021	August 8, 2021
2	8	April 14, 2023	May 26, 2023

=== Season 1 (2021) ===
No. overall	No. in season	Title	Directed by	Written by	Original release date	U.S. viewers (millions)
1	1	"The Ordeal"	Seith Mann	Rafael Casal & Daveed Diggs	June 13, 2021 (Note: This episode premiered at the Tribeca Film Festival on June 11, 2021, ahead of its weekly Starz premieres.)	N/A
2	2	"Smashley Rose"	Seith Mann	Rafael Casal & Daveed Diggs	June 20, 2021	N/A
3	3	"The Rule of Three"	Aurora Guerrero	Priscila Garcia-Jacquier	June 27, 2021	N/A
4	4	"The Four Hustlateers"	Aurora Guerrero	Rafael Casal & Daveed Diggs	July 4, 2021	N/A
5	5	"Beaches Be Trippin"	Erin Feeley	Alanna Brown	July 18, 2021	N/A
6	6	"Ghost Dad"	Pete Chatmon	Nijla Mu'min	July 25, 2021	0.088
7	7	"Seannie Darko"	Angela Barnes	Benjamin Earl Turner	August 1, 2021	N/A
8	8	"Bride or Die"	Rafael Casal	Rafael Casal & Daveed Diggs	August 8, 2021	0.066

=== Season 2 (2023) ===
No. overall	No. in season	Title	Directed by	Written by	Original release date	U.S. viewers (millions)
9	1	"Planes, Trains, and Automobiles"	Rafael Casal	Brittany Miller	April 14, 2023	N/A
10	2	"Life Is Too Short"	Rafael Casal	Benjamin Earl Turner	April 14, 2023	N/A
11	3	"N*ggaz and Jesus"	Jess Wu Calder	Rafael Casal & Daveed Diggs	April 21, 2023	N/A
12	4	"By Hook or by Crook"	Jess Wu Calder	Sarah LaBrie	April 28, 2023	N/A
13	5	"Karate Kiss"	Blackhorse Lowe	Obehi Janice	May 5, 2023	0.064
14	6	"The Good, the Bad, and the Thizzly"	Rafael Casal	Sanjay Shah	May 12, 2023	N/A
15	7	"Meatfest"	Darrell Woodard	Nyesha Littlejohn & Susan Park	May 19, 2023	N/A
16	8	"Return to Ithaca"	Rafael Casal	Rafael Casal & Daveed Diggs	May 26, 2023	0.093

== Production ==
=== Development ===
In September 2020, it was announced that Starz had ordered a spin-off series of Blindspotting by Carlos López Estrada, with Jasmine Cephas Jones set to star and produce, with Daveed Diggs and Rafael Casal serving as executive producers and writers on the series. Production companies involved with the series were slated to consist of Lionsgate Television, Snoot Entertainment, and Barnyard Projects. In December 2020, Benjamin Earl Turner, Atticus Woodward, Jaylen Barron, Candace Nicholas-Lippman and Helen Hunt joined the cast in starring roles, with Rafael Casal and Justin Chu Cary set to appear in recurring capacity.

Principal photography for the series began in December 2020. Production for the first season took place in March 2021 in West Oakland, Oakland, California.

Diggs does not reprise his film role as Collin in the first season beyond a voice cameo in the finale, despite co-creating the show. Casal hoped to include Collin during the planning stages, but Diggs wished for the season to focus on Ashley. He ultimately came to regret not making an appearance. Diggs and Casal both expressed interest in bringing back Collin for a potential second season.

On October 14, 2021, Starz renewed the series for a second season. On April 14, 2022, LeVar Burton, Katlynn Simone Smith, Tamera Tomakili, and Tim Chantarangsu were cast in recurring roles, while E-40, P-Lo and Too $hort were set to guest star for the second season. Production for the series' sophomore season wrapped on April 28, 2022.

It was announced on January 11, 2023 that Starz would premiere a number of episodes of their sophomore season at the 2023 SXSW Festival held in Austin, Texas in March under the TV Spotlight category.

On September 25, 2023, Starz canceled the series after two seasons.

=== Music ===
Show creators Rafael Casal and Daveed Diggs recruited fellow schoolmate Ambrose Akinmusire and Blindspotting film composer Michael Yezerski to compose the score for the series. Akinmusire and Yezerski have created score to accompany spoken word, verse, dance, and various other types of scenes demonstrated throughout the series. In a Variety article, Akinmusire and Yezerski describe the experience as "a very rare opportunity for the score to just become the driving language of a piece of dramatic television content."

==== Soundtrack ====
Album	Year	Composed by	Featured artists	Details
Blindspotting (Music from the STARZ Original Series, Season 1)	2021	Ambrose Akinmusire Michael Yezerski	Jasmine Cephas Jones Rafael Casal Benjamin Earl Turner	Release date: September 17, 2021; Label: Lions Gate Entertainment Inc; Formats: Streaming
Blindspotting (Music from the STARZ Original Series, Season 2)	2023	Ambrose Akinmusire Michael Yezerski	Jasmine Cephas Jones Rafael Casal Benjamin Earl Turner Helen Hunt	Release date: May 26, 2023; Label: Lions Gate Entertainment Inc; Formats: Streaming

== Release ==
The series had its world premiere at the Tribeca Film Festival on June 11, 2021. It premiered on Starz on June 13, 2021. The second season premiered on April 14, 2023.

== Reception ==
=== Critical response ===
On Rotten Tomatoes, the first season holds an approval rating of 100% based on 25 critic reviews, with an average rating of 7.5/10. The website's critical consensus reads, "The rare adaptation that exceeds its source material, Blindspotting deftly takes on complicated social constructs with comedic flair, crafting a show that's as funny as it is poignant while giving its incredible ensemble—led by the captivating Jasmine Cephas Jones—plenty of room to shine." On Metacritic, it has a weighted average score of 76 out of 100, based on 15 critics, indicating "generally favorable reviews".

The second season has a 100% approval rating on Rotten Tomatoes, based on 5 critic reviews, with an average rating of 8.7/10.

=== Awards and nominations ===
Year	Award	Category	Nominee(s)	Result	Ref.
2021	Women's Image Awards	Outstanding Actress in a Comedy Series	Jasmine Cephas Jones	Nominated	
2021	Women's Image Awards	Outstanding Comedy Series	Blindspotting	Nominated	
2021	Geneva International Film Festival	Best International TV Series	Blindspotting	Nominated	
2021	Hollywood Music in Media Awards	Best Music Supervision - TV Show/Limited Series	Blindspotting (supervision by Jonathan McHugh)	Nominated	
2021	Gotham Awards	Breakthrough Series – Short Format	Blindspotting	Nominated	
2021	Clio Awards	Press/Influencer Kits & Collateral	Blindspotting (created by A Very Good Job)	Won	
2021	Film Independent Spirit Awards	Best Female Performance in a Scripted Series	Jasmine Cephas Jones	Nominated	
2021	Film Independent Spirit Awards	Best New Scripted Series	Blindspotting	Nominated	
2022	Guild of Music Supervisors Awards	Best Music Supervision - Television Comedy or Musical	Blindspotting, Season 1 (supervision by Jonathan McHugh)	Nominated	
2022	NAMIC Vision Awards	Best Performance – Comedy	Jasmine Cephas Jones	Nominated	
2022	Hollywood Critics Association TV Awards	Best Actress in a Broadcast Network or Cable Series, Comedy	Jasmine Cephas Jones	Nominated	
2023	SXSW Audience Awards	TV Spotlight Audience Award	Blindspotting - Season 2	Won	
2023	Primetime Emmy Award	Outstanding Choreography For Scripted Programming	The History / San Quentin Blues (Choreography by Jon Boogz)	Won	
