= FreeRayshawn =

American TV series

#FreeRayshawn
- Genre: Crime drama
- Written by: Marc Maurino
- Directed by: Seith Mann
- Starring: Laurence Fishburne; Stephan James; Jasmine Cephas Jones; Skeet Ulrich
- No. of seasons: 1
- No. of episodes: 15

Production
- Executive producers: Antoine Fuqua; David Boorstein; Kat Samick; Justin Bursch; Seith Mann; Marc Maurino
- Production companies: Fuqua Films; Sony Pictures Television

Original release
- Network: Quibi
- Release: April 13 – April 29, 2020

#FreeRayshawn (stylized as #freerayshawn) is an American crime drama television series written by Marc Maurino and directed by Seith Mann that debuted on Quibi on April 6, 2020.

== Premise ==
Rayshawn Morris, an African-American Iraqi War veteran, finds himself holed up in his apartment along with his family after an altercation with overzealous NOPD cops. As he prepares to make his last stand, Rayshawn turns to social media and the help of a sympathetic police lieutenant for him to try to clear his name.

== Cast ==
- Laurence Fishburne as Lt. Steven Poincy
- Stephan James as Rayshawn Morris
- Jasmine Cephas Jones as Tyisha
- Skeet Ulrich as Sgt. Mike Trout
- Danny Boyd Jr. as Ray Jr.
- Thomas Blake Jr. as Detective Soules
- Mitch Eakins as Detective Tommy Roberts
- Alyshia Ochse as DA Sarah Foreman
- Daniel Sunjata as SWAT Commander Alvarez

== Episodes ==
No.	Title	Directed by	Written by	Original release date
1	"What Are You Doing Here?"	Seith Mann	Marc Maurino	April 13, 2020
On the run from police, former Iraqi War veteran Rayshawn Morris hides out in his apartment with his wife Tyisha and 5 year-old son Rayshawn "RayRay" Jr. In their attempt to leave the building, the family encounters responding officer Steven Poincy
2	"Clear the Building"	Seith Mann	Marc Maurino	April 13, 2020
With nowhere to run to, Rayshawn's family is forced to barricade themselves in the apartment. As the building is cleared out, Rayshawn uses social media to explain the situation until a mishap causes police to open fire.
3	"Get Away From the Windows"	Seith Mann	Marc Maurino	April 13, 2020
4	"Put the Brother On the Phone"	Seith Mann	Marc Maurino	April 14, 2020
5	"Face to Face"	Seith Mann	Marc Maurino	April 15, 2020
6	"It's Ok to Be Scared"	Seith Mann	Marc Maurino	April 16, 2020
7	"I'm Not a Negotiator"	Seith Mann	Marc Maurino	April 17, 2020
8	"No Way Back"	Seith Mann	Marc Maurino	April 20, 2020
9	"They All Want Me Dead, Don't They?"	Seith Mann	Marc Maurino	April 21, 2020
10	"He's Telling the Truth"	Seith Mann	Marc Maurino	April 22, 2020
11	"Black or Blue"	Seith Mann	Marc Maurino	April 23, 2020
12	"Fire in the Hole"	Seith Mann	Marc Maurino	April 24, 2020
13	"It's Time to Go"	Seith Mann	Marc Maurino	April 27, 2020
14	"It's your Lucky Day, Marine"	Seith Mann	Marc Maurino	April 28, 2020
In a flashback before the events of the series, Rayshawn gets caught up in a drug deal that leads to his fight for survival.
15	"He Just Wanted To Be Heard"	Seith Mann	Marc Maurino	April 29, 2020
Unable to maintain his stress, Rayshawn lashes out at Trout and the police while SWAT escorts his family to safety.

== Accolades ==
Year	Award	Category	Nominee(s)	Result	Ref.
2020	Primetime Emmy Awards	Outstanding Actor in a Short Form Comedy or Drama Series	Laurence Fishburne	Won	
2020	Primetime Emmy Awards	Outstanding Actor in a Short Form Comedy or Drama Series	Stephan James	Nominated	
2020	Primetime Emmy Awards	Outstanding Actress in a Short Form Comedy or Drama Series	Jasmine Cephas Jones	Won	
2021	Casting Society of America	Short Form Series	Jessica Kelly, Mary Vernieu and Brent Caballero	Won	
2021	NAACP Image Awards	Outstanding Short-Form Series – Comedy or Drama	FreeRayshawn	Won	
2021	NAACP Image Awards	Outstanding Performance in a Short-Form Series	Jasmine Cephas Jones	Nominated	
2021	NAACP Image Awards	Outstanding Performance in a Short-Form Series	Laurence Fishburne	Won	
2021	NAACP Image Awards	Outstanding Performance in a Short-Form Series	Stephan James	Nominated	
2021	Writers Guild of America Awards	Original & Adapted Short Form New Media	Marc Maurino	Won	
