= Blindspotting =

2018 American film by Carlos López Estrada

- Theatrical release poster
- Directed by: Carlos López Estrada
- Written by: Rafael Casal; Daveed Diggs
- Produced by: Keith Calder; Jess Calder; Rafael Casal; Daveed Diggs
- Starring: Daveed Diggs; Rafael Casal; Janina Gavankar; Jasmine Cephas Jones; Ethan Embry; Tisha Campbell-Martin; Utkarsh Ambudkar; Wayne Knight
- Cinematography: Robby Baumgartner
- Edited by: Gabriel Fleming
- Music by: Michael Yezerski
- Production company: Snoot Entertainment
- Distributed by: Lionsgate (under Summit Entertainment and Codeblack Films)
- Release dates: January 18, 2018 (Sundance); July 20, 2018 (United States)
- Running time: 95 minutes
- Country: United States
- Language: English
- Box office: $5 million

Blindspotting is a 2018 American comedy drama film written and produced by Daveed Diggs and Rafael Casal. The film is directed by Carlos López Estrada (in his feature directorial debut), and Diggs and Casal star alongside Janina Gavankar, Jasmine Cephas Jones, Ethan Embry, Tisha Campbell-Martin, Utkarsh Ambudkar, and Wayne Knight. The plot follows a parolee with three days left on his sentence, only to have him witness a police shooting that threatens to ruin a lifelong friendship.

Diggs and Casal, childhood friends in real life, wrote the screenplay in the mid-2000s, initially to speak for the city of Oakland, which they felt was often misrepresented in film. After years of delays, the pair's schedules finally allowed them to make the film, with principal photography beginning in June 2017.

Blindspotting had its world premiere on January 18, 2018 in the U.S. Dramatic Competition section at the 2018 Sundance Film Festival. The film had a limited theatrical release on July 20, 2018, before expanding wide on July 27, 2018. The film received positive reviews from critics, and at the 34th Independent Spirit Awards, was nominated for Best Male Lead for Diggs' performance, while López Estrada earned a Directors Guild of America Award nomination for Outstanding Directing – First-Time Feature Film.

A spin-off sequel television series of same name, created and executive produced by Diggs and Casal and run by Casal, premiered in 2021. It focuses on Jones' character, Ashley, with Casal also part of the main cast and Diggs appearing as guest.

== Plot ==
Collin Hoskins, an African-American convicted felon, is struggling to finish the last three days of his probation. Collin, along with his short-tempered white best friend, Miles Turner, works for a moving company located in Oakland, California. One night while waiting for a red light, Collin witnesses a white police officer fatally shoot a fleeing black man. As Collin is haunted by the incident, he begins to have nightmares and experiences hallucinations.

At the same time, Miles becomes distraught by the gentrification of Oakland and a resulting sense of loss of identity, home, and belonging. Miles purchases a handgun from a friend on the basis of self-protection, an action of which Collin strongly disapproves. Collin tries to reconnect with his ex-girlfriend Val; there is an awkward distance between them despite their feelings for each other. A witness recounts the fight which led to Collin's incarceration: Collin was working door at a local club when a drunk white customer stepped outside to show off a flaming drink. Collin informed him that this violated state liquor laws but the man verbally abused and shoved Collin, starting a fight which ended with the man beaten and set aflame; Val witnessed the end of this shocking scene.

As Miles continues to display erratic behavior, Val warns Collin of the dangers that may result from a continued friendship with Miles. On Collin's last evening of probation, Miles's young son Sean finds the gun and Collin narrowly averts a tragic accident. Horrified, Sean's mother Ashley forces Miles and Collin to take the gun and leave.

Miles and Collin go to a party at an upscale new house owned by an enthusiastic newcomer to Oakland. The "kill a hipster" T-shirt that Sean gave Miles is misinterpreted as being an ironic self-effacing statement, and the only other African-American man at the party takes issue with Miles's persona, misinterpreting it as cultural appropriation. They get into a physical fight and Miles takes out his frustrations, beating the man. Ordered to leave, Miles terrorizes the host and his guests by firing his gun into the air while proclaiming his authenticity to the neighborhood.

Collin rushes Miles away before the police arrive and takes his gun. In an explosive argument, Collin criticizes Miles for his reckless behavior and the trouble it keeps causing him. Miles returns home and reconciles with Ashley while she treats his injuries, and he realizes that he doesn't face the same struggles as his loved ones. Collin phones Val and, referencing the face–vase illusion from her college studies, asks if she has a blind spot with him and whether she can see past her recollection of the fight.

With his probation completed, Collin continues to feel psychologically troubled by the police shooting he witnessed. As he and Miles are finishing a moving job, the house is revealed to be that of Officer Molina, the same police officer whom Collin witnessed killing a man days earlier. Collin holds the officer at gunpoint, and Miles watches as Collin launches into a freestyle rap, criticizing the relationship between the police and African Americans, as well as the gentrification in Oakland. He breaks some of the officer's property, but does not shoot the gun, leaving the distraught officer behind. Following a moment of solemnity, Collin and Miles repair their friendship as they drive to their next job.

== Cast ==
- Daveed Diggs as Collin Hoskins, a former convicted felon on his last three days of probation. He is friendly and laid back.
- Rafael Casal as Miles Turner, Collin's short-tempered and reckless best friend. The two have been close since childhood.
- Janina Gavankar as Val, a desk secretary and Collin's love interest. According to Miles, she never visited him while in prison. She urges Collin to end his relationship with Miles because Miles could get Collin in trouble.
- Jasmine Cephas Jones as Ashley, Miles' partner and mother of Sean.
- Ethan Embry as Officer Molina
- Tisha Campbell-Martin as Mama Liz
- Utkarsh Ambudkar as Rin
- Wayne Knight as Patrick
- Justin Chu Cary as Tin
- Kevin Carroll as James
- Nyambi Nyambi as Yorkie
- Lance Cameron Holloway as Curtis 'Cuttie' Cuttworth
- Margo Hall as Nancy, Collin's mother
- Jon Chaffin as Dez
- Leland Orser as Judge
- Sarah Kay as Angela
- Travis Parker as Randall Marshall

== Production ==
=== Background ===
The screenplay for Blindspotting was written by Daveed Diggs and Rafael Casal over a period of nine years. Diggs, who grew up in Oakland, and Casal, who grew up in bordering Berkeley, California, felt that cinematic portrayals of the San Francisco Bay Area have constantly "missed something". They wanted to draw attention to the culture, community, and sense of "heightened reality" that shape life in Oakland. The film addresses issues of gentrification, police violence, and racism.

=== Music ===
The film's score was composed by Michael Yezerski, and the soundtrack includes dozens of licensed songs from Bay Area artists. To Diggs and Casal, it was important that the music used in the film be from the city. According to Diggs, "The sound of the city was as important as anything else. For us, maybe even more important because we have real input. We can make a music choice that we thought will add to the humanity of everything." Diggs and Casal even picked musicians from the area to perform on the score to find a sound that was specific to Oakland. Musicians, including drummer John Mader from Oakland (who also played drums for the Broadway musical Hamilton, starring Diggs), The Regiment Horns from Berkeley, and bassist Josh Hari from Oakland performed on the score.

Blindspotting additionally features several rap performances by Diggs and Casal. The freestyle at the film's climax was entirely written by Casal, and the word choice remained mostly unchanged for years.

=== Filming ===
Principal photography finally began in June 2017 and lasted for 22 days, filming around Oakland.

== Soundtracks ==
In lieu of a soundtrack album, two EPs were released. The Collin EP and The Miles EP are meant to represent both characters' perspectives, with Casal saying "It really felt like a way for people to drop into the music environment of the film. ... The spirit of each project is driven by being in the head or environment of the character." The Collin EP is described as being "little more cerebral, it’s if Collin were to think out loud," while The Miles EP is "trappier, 808 kind of music that the Bay Area is also known for that I imagine is what Miles drives around listening to. I imagine he's a little stoned, it’s a little angrier, a little grittier." Much of the material on the EPs were not included in the film. Several of the tracks include features by notable Bay Area artists, including Too $hort and T-Pain, and much of Diggs' and Casals' lyrics come from spoken word pieces they have performed in the past.

The opening tracks on both EPs, "Commander Smiley" and "Commander Miles," were recorded for the film, but were ultimately cut. The only original tracks featured in the film are "In My City," "Running to the Sky," and "Not a Game," with the rest being exclusive to the soundtrack EPs. The several rap performances by Diggs and Casal featured in the movie are not included on the EPs.

A third project, The Town EP, had a planned August 10 release date (along with the original release date of The Miles EP), and was described as being "more anthemic in trying to represent a little more sense of the timeless sense of the town." The project was never released, however.

The track "Time & Distance" on The Miles EP was removed after release because of licensing issues.

== Release ==
Blindspotting premiered at Sundance Film Festival on January 18, 2018. A few days later, Lionsgate, under its Codeblack Films and Summit Entertainment banners, acquired worldwide distribution rights to the film, beating bidders including CBS Films, Neon, MoviePass and The Orchard, the latter of which nearly acquired the film before Lionsgate raised their bid. The film was given a limited theatrical release in the United States on July 20, 2018, followed by a wide release date on July 27, 2018.

== Reception ==
=== Box office ===
Blindspotting grossed $332,500 in its opening weekend from 14 locations, including in Los Angeles, New York City, San Francisco, and Oakland, for a $23,750 average per theater. It expanded to 513 theaters in its second weekend and made $1.3 million.

=== Critical response ===
On review aggregator Rotten Tomatoes, the film has an approval rating of 94% based on 176 reviews, and an average rating of 8.1/10. The website's critical consensus reads, "As timely as it is overall impactful, Blindspotting blends buddy comedy with seething social commentary, and rises on the strength of Daveed Diggs' powerful performance." On Metacritic, the film has a weighted average score of 77 out of 100, based on 43 critics, indicating "generally favorable" reviews.

Former United States President Barack Obama named Blindspotting among his favorite films of 2018, in his annual list of favorite films.

== Television adaptation ==
In September 2020, Starz ordered a TV spinoff of Blindspotting, with Jasmine Cephas Jones set to reprise her role as Ashley. Daveed Diggs and Rafael Casal act as writers and executive producers on the series, with Casal to serve as showrunner. The pair each also reprise their roles in the premiere episode. The series will focus on Ashley's point of view when Miles is imprisoned. Production began in December 2020.

== See also ==
- List of hood films
