= As They Made Us =

2022 American film by Mayim Bialik

- Theatrical release poster
- Directed by: Mayim Bialik
- Written by: Mayim Bialik
- Produced by: Mayim Bialik; Anne Clements; Jordan Yale Levine; Jordan Beckerman; Ash Christian; Mark Maxey; Michael Day
- Starring: Dianna Agron; Simon Helberg; Candice Bergen; Dustin Hoffman; Julian Gant; Charlie Weber; Justin Chu Cary
- Cinematography: David Feeney-Mosier
- Edited by: Nick Wright; Monica Salazar
- Music by: Kevin Besignano
- Production companies: Screen Media; Chicken Soup for the Soul Entertainment; Film Mode Entertainment; Yale Productions; Sad Clown Productions; Idiot Savant Pictures; Cranium Entertainment; Bondt Media Capital; Carte Blanche; Rolling Pictures; Vested Interest; Slated
- Distributed by: Quiver Distribution
- Release date: April 8, 2022
- Running time: 100 minutes
- Country: United States
- Language: English

As They Made Us is a 2022 American comedy-drama film written, directed and produced by Mayim Bialik, in her feature directorial debut. The film stars Dianna Agron, Simon Helberg, Candice Bergen, Dustin Hoffman, Julian Gant, Charlie Weber and Justin Chu Cary. The plot follows Abigail (Agron) and the last moments that she and her family spend with her dying father (Hoffman). It was released in theaters and on video on demand by Quiver Distribution on April 8, 2022. It received positive reviews from critics.

== Plot ==
A series of flashbacks showcases Abigail's childhood and upbringing. In the present day, Abigail is a divorced mother of two sons. A specialist recommends that she hire a caregiver for her parents, Barbara and Eugene, when the latter loses his ability to walk. As the days progress, Eugene is put in a hospice, with a prognosis of having approximately six months to live, devastating Barbara.

Abigail visits her estranged brother, Nathan. Nathan talks to Eugene, but refuses to visit Barbara. Abigail begins a relationship with Jay, a landscaper. Eugene confesses his love for Barbara before dying a few days later. Abigail and Barbara attend his funeral, but Nathan is emotionally unable to attend himself. Abigail argues with Nathan for leaving her alone during this emotionally difficult time. Six months later, Nathan invites Abigail to his daughter's graduation party and they reconnect.

== Cast ==
- Dianna Agron as Abigail, a harried and struggling divorcee and mother of two sons
- Simon Helberg as Nathan, Abigail's estranged brother
- Candice Bergen as Barbara, Abigail's difficult mother
- Dustin Hoffman as Eugene, Abigail's father whose health is failing
- Justin Chu Cary as Jay, a landscaper to whom Abigail is attracted
- Charlie Weber as Peter, Abigail's unsupportive ex-husband
- Julian Gant as Darrin, Eugene's full-time in-home care nurse
- John Wollman as Dr. Ashkenazy, Eugene's original physician
- Sweta Keswani as Dr. Patel, a neurologist to whom Barbara goes for a second opinion

== Production ==
In September 2019, it was reported that actress Mayim Bialik would make her feature-film writing and directing debut with the drama, As Sick as They Made Us. In November 2019, it was announced that Dustin Hoffman, Candice Bergen, Simon Helberg and Olivia Thirlby would star. In a December 2020 interview, Bialik said that it would be filmed after the COVID-19 pandemic.

In April 2021, it was reported that Dianna Agron had replaced Thirlby due to the schedule disruption caused by the pandemic. In June 2021, Justin Chu Cary and Charlie Weber joined the cast, as filming commenced in New Jersey.

The film was reportedly inspired by Bialik's experience with her father's death a few years prior.

== Release ==
In February 2022, the film was acquired by Quiver Distribution, which released it in theaters and on VOD April 8, 2022. The original title for the film was, As Sick as They Make Us, which is a line from the film; but was shortened to its present title just before its release.

== Reception ==
On the review aggregator website, Rotten Tomatoes, 81% of 21 reviews are positive, with an average rating of 6.9/10. Metacritic, which uses a weighted average, assigned the film a score of 61 out of 100, based on eight critics, indicating "generally favorable" reviews.

The New York Times gave the film a positive review, describing it as an "engagingly compassionate directorial debut", and praising the ensemble's adept performances, particularly Agron's portrayal.

In her review for RogerEbert.com, film critic Christy Lemire gave the film 2.5 stars out of 4. She noted that the film finds strong moments in understated scenes, allowing for nuanced character dynamics. She highlighted an initial unevenness in the movie's pacing, stemming from the alternating narrative structure, but acknowledged the film's effectiveness in portraying everyday moments, and the sensitive handling of themes related to loss and family dynamics, with Agron's performance particularly noteworthy.

Variety praised Agron's subtle performance, and acknowledged Bialik's strategic use of seasoned actors, like Hoffman and Bergen. The review commended the director's adept handling of storytelling rhythms, and the film's insights into grief and relationships, although it noted that it leaves a "minor, even inconsequential" impression compared to other films in its thematic genre.

William Bibbiani of TheWrap praised Bialik's "impressive feature debut", describing it as a "sensitive portrayal of end-of-life care". He noted that Bialik finds a "shocking amount of pity" for the protagonist's abusive parents, and lauded Bergen's standout performance as a self-centered matriarch. While acknowledging some unevenness in the film's construction, particularly in attempts to de-age Hoffman, and editing nuances, Bibbiani underscored its triumph as a character-driven showcase.

The Jerusalem Post labeled the film as "very Jewish", and highlighted its relatability, stating that "nearly everyone will see themselves – or at least, aspects of themselves – among the characters". Commending Hoffman's transformative depiction of a man's delayed self-discovery, as well as Bergen's portrayal of an amusingly irksome mother, the review also praised the skillful interplay of comedy and tragedy within scenes. The review acknowledged minor flaws, but concluded that the well-paced film effectively engendered viewer empathy for the characters' journey toward catharsis.

Richard Roeper of the Chicago-Sun Times delivered a less favorable critique, giving the film a 2 rating out of 4. Acknowledging the commendable cast and Bialik's skilled pacing, he described the film as "depressingly downbeat", attributing discomfort to the "thoroughly unlikeable and irredeemable" characters portrayed by Hoffman and Bergen. Roeper highlighted the authentic dialogue and strong performances, yet emphasized the persistent somber atmosphere, ultimately suggesting that Abigail's better course might have been to distance herself from her troubled past.

Writing for LA Weekly, Michael Atkinson commented on the recurring theme of generational films, noting how Hollywood's late Baby boomer/early Gen X cohort's current focus was on movies about aging parents. Discussing the film's portrayal of parental dysfunction, he pointed out moments of sensitivity juxtaposed with pop-culture humor that occasionally feels excessive.
