= Seith Mann =

American film and television director (born 1973)

Seith Mann (born 1973) is an American film and television director. He directed the short film Five Deep Breaths (2003) and has gone on to direct episodes of The Wire, Grey's Anatomy and Fringe.

== Biography ==
Mann was inspired to become a director when he saw the Spike Lee film Do the Right Thing. Mann graduated from Morehouse College and later earned an MFA in film at the Tisch School of the Arts at New York University.

=== Five Deep Breaths ===
Mann's thesis at New York University was the short film Five Deep Breaths. It was awarded the Spike Lee fellowship while in development in 2002. The film is set at an all-black college. After a physical assault upon a young woman by her boyfriend, another man, Mark, and his friends are moved to take revenge. Mann has commented that he likes morally ambiguous situations. The short starred Jamie Hector, Anslem Richardson, Marcuis Harris, Harvey Gardner Moore, Curtiss Cook, and Ka'ramuu Kush. The score was composed by jazz musician Jason Moran.

The film premiered at the 2003 Sundance Film Festival. It won first place in the Charles and Lucille King Family Foundation Award (for Best Short Film), and The Carl Lerner Award for Film with Social Significance at the 2003 New York University First Run Festival. It was selected to screen at the 2003 Tribeca Film Festival and one of four American shorts to screen at the Cinefondation Competition at the 2003 Cannes Film Festival. It won a Gold Plaque for Narrative Short Film at the 2003 Chicago International Film Festival. It also won the Best Narrative Short Film award at the 2003 Los Angeles IFP/West Film Festival.

Film maker magazine named Mann one of their 25 new faces of independent film in 2003. They praised his direction of Five Short Breaths as "skillful". The IFP gave Mann the Gordon Parks Awards for Emerging African-American Filmmakers following the film's release.

=== Television ===
Television Producer Robert F. Colesberry saw Five Deep Breaths and introduced the other producers of HBO drama The Wire to it. The producers approached Mann and asked him to shadow their directors during production of the third season in 2004. Show runner David Simon recalls that Colesberry wanted Mann to direct a third season episode but Colesberry's untimely death left the other producers reeling and they felt unable to risk a directorial debut in their first season without him. Simon recalls Mann shadowing director Ernest R. Dickerson and showing a "careful interest in the process."

In 2006, Mann joined the directing crew of The Wire's fourth season. Simon felt obligated to give Mann a chance after his dedication to shadowing Dickerson. Mann made his television directing debut with the third episode of the season, "Home Rooms". Simon was pleased with the episode and described it as "beautifully covered."

Mann also was an ABC DGA Fellow class of 2005, a fellowship aimed at encouraging "diversity of race, gender and spirit in the filmmaking community." In 2007 Mann was nominated for an NAACP Image Award in the category Outstanding Directing in a Dramatic Series for his work on episode "Home Rooms". Mann has commented that he was "excited" to receive the nomination and grateful to the NAACP for their work.

After The Wire, Mann worked on Grey's Anatomy directing two episodes in 2006, "The Name of the Game" and "Don't Stand So Close to Me". In 2007, Mann was nominated for a DGA Award in the category Outstanding Directorial Achievement in Comedy Series for his work on "The Name of the Game". Mann has also directed episodes of Heroes, Cold Case, Lincoln Heights, Jericho, Entourage, Friday Night Lights, Men in Trees, Shark, Fringe, Blindspotting, and The Walking Dead.

=== Future projects ===
Mann is working on a feature film script entitled Come Sunday. The script won two development awards (the Emerging Narrative Screenwriting Award and the Gordon Parks Award for Screenwriting) from the IFP in 2004. In 2010, Mann was announced as director of Miss: Better Living Through Crime with Spike Lee producing. In 2016, Mann was writing the Black movie.

== Filmography ==
=== Director ===
Year	Show	Episode	Notes
2026	The Drop: A Snowfall Saga	"The Big Push"	Season 1, episode 4
2026	R.J. Decker	"You've Got Bale"	Season 1, episode 7
2026	Doc	"Chief"	Season 2, episode 10
2025	Brilliant Minds	"The Doctor's Graveyard"	Season 2, episode 6
2025	Good American Family	"Ghosts Everywhere"	Season 1, episode 3
2022	Let the Right One In	"Broken Glass"	Season 1, episode 3
2022	Let the Right One In	"Intercessors"	Season 1, episode 2
2022	Let the Right One In	"Anything for Blood"	Season 1, episode 1
2021	Blindspotting	"Smashley Rose"	Season 1, episode 2
2021	Blindspotting	"The Ordeal"	Season 1, episode 1
2020	#FreeRayshawn	"He Just Wanted to Be Heard"	Season 1, episode 15
2020	#FreeRayshawn	"It's Your Lucky Day, Marine"	Season 1, episode 14
2020	#FreeRayshawn	"It's Time to Go"	Season 1, episode 13
2020	#FreeRayshawn	"Fire in the Hole"	Season 1, episode 12
2020	#FreeRayshawn	"Black or Blue"	Season 1, episode 11
2020	#FreeRayshawn	"He's Telling the Truth"	Season 1, episode 10
2020	#FreeRayshawn	"They All Want Me Dead, Don't They?"	Season 1, episode 9
2020	#FreeRayshawn	"No Way Back"	Season 1, episode 8
2020	#FreeRayshawn	"I'm Not a Negotiator"	Season 1, episode 7
2020	#FreeRayshawn	"It's OK to Be Scared"	Season 1, episode 6
2020	#FreeRayshawn	"Face to Face"	Season 1, episode 5
2020	#FreeRayshawn	"Put the Brother On the Phone"	Season 1, episode 4
2020	#FreeRayshawn	"Get Away From the Windows"	Season 1, episode 3
2020	#FreeRayshawn	"Clear the Building"	Season 1, episode 2
2020	#FreeRayshawn	"What Are You Doing Here?"	Season 1, episode 1
2020	Homeland	"One Chalk Up"	Season 8, episode 14
2020	New Amsterdam	"14 Years, 2 Months, 8 Days"	Season 2, episode 12
2019	Raising Dion	"Issue #101: How Do You Raise a Superhero?" and "Issue #109: Storm Killer"	Season 1, episode 1 and Season 1, episode 9
2018	Elementary	"Sober Companions"	Season 6, episode 11
2017	White Famous	"Duality" and "Scandal"	Season 1, episode 7 and Season 1, episode 9
2017	The Breaks	"Under Pressure" and "N.T."	Season 1, episode 7 and Season 1, episode 8
2017	Homeland	"R Is for Romeo"	Season 6, episode 11
2016	Ballers	"Everybody Knows"	Season 2, episode 7
2016	The Breaks		TV film
2016	Elementary	"You've Got Me, Who's Got You?"	Season 4, episode 17
2015	Homeland	"Our Man in Damascus"	Season 5, episode 11
2015	Ballers	"Machete Change"	Season 1, episode 4
2015	Veracity		Short film
2015	Elementary	"The One That Got Away" and "The View from Olympus"	Season 3, episode 12 and Season 3, episode 18
2014	Homeland	"There's Something Else Going On"	Season 4, episode 9
2014	Hell on Wheels	"Bleeding Kansas"	Season 4, episode 11
2014	Rectify	"Until You're Blue"	Season 2, episode 9
2014	Nurse Jackie	"The Lady with the Tramp" and "Sidecars and Spermicide"	Season 6, episode 8 and Season 6, episode 10
2014	Californication	"Getting the Poison Out"	Season 7, episode 5
2014	Elementary	"Ears to You" and "The Man with the Twisted Lip"	Season 2, episode 17 and Season 2, episode 21
2014	The Walking Dead	"Claimed" and "Consumed"	Season 4, episode 11 and Season 5, episode 6
2013	Homeland	"A Red Wheel Barrow"	Season 3, episode 8
2013	Unforgettable	"Incognito"	Season 2, episode 2
2013	Nurse Jackie	"Walk of Shame"	Season 5, episode 6
2013	Touch	"Ghosts"	Season 2, episode 7
2013	Californication	"Everybody's a Fucking Critic"	Season 5, episode 8
2013	Elementary	"Possibility Two" and "The Woman"	Season 1, episode 17 and Season 1, episode 23
2013	The Walking Dead	"Home"	Season 3, episode 10
2012	Elementary	"One Way to Get Off"	Season 1, episode 7
2012	Falling Skies	"Death Match"	Season 2, episode 8
2012	Common Law	"Hot for Teacher"	Season 1, episode 11
2012	Nurse Jackie	"The Wall" and "Slow Glowing Monsters"	Season 4, episode 3 and Season 4, episode 4
2012	The Finder	"The Great Escape"	Season 1, episode 5
2012	House of Lies	"Microphallus"	Season 1, episode 3
2012	Californication	"Boys & Girls"	Season 5, episode 3
2011	Dexter	"Get Geller"	Season 6, episode 9
2011	Hawthorne	"Fight or Flight"	Season 3, episode 2
2011	Californication	"The Trial"	Season 4, episode 10
2011	Detroit 1-8-7	"Key to the City"	Season 1, episode 12
2010	My Generation	"Birth/Rebirth"	Season 1, episode 4
2010	Lie to Me	"The Canary's Song"	Season 3, episode 5
2010	Rubicon	"Look to the Ant"	Season 1, episode 6
2010	Fringe	"Brown Betty"	Season 2, episode 20
2010	Melrose Place	"Stoner Canyon"	Season 1, episode 14
2010	Mercy	"Can We Talk About the Gigantic Elephant in the Ambulance?"	Season 1, episode 13
2010	Friday Night Lights	"Injury List"	Season 4, episode 11
2009	Californication	"Dogtown"	Season 3, episode 10
2009	Heroes	"Cold Wars" and "Thanksgiving"	Season 3, episode 17 and Season 4, episode 10
2009	Hung	"This is America or Fifty Bucks"	Season 1, episode 9
2009	Harper's Island	"Gasp"	Season 1, episode 12
2009	Lie to Me	"Undercover"	Season 1, episode 11
2008	Brotherhood	"The Course of True Love Never Did Run Smooth"	Season 3, episode 4
2008	Crash	"Panic"	Season 1, episode 3
2008	Everybody Hates Chris	"Everybody Hates the English Teacher"	Season 4, Episode 4
2008	Sons of Anarchy	"AK-51"	Season 1, episode 5
2008	Entourage	"Redomption"	Season 5, episode 6
2008	Entourage	"Fire Sale"	Season 5, episode 4
2008	The Riches	"Slums of Bayou Hills"	Season 2, episode 4
2008	Jericho	"Patriots and Tyrants"	Season 2, episode 7
2008	The Wire	"The Dickensian Aspect"	Season 5, episode 6
2007	Shark	"Student Body"	Season 2, episode 5
2007	Men in Trees	"Chemical Reactions"	Season 2, episode 2
2007	Friday Night Lights	"Are You Ready for Friday Night?"	Season 2, episode 3
2007	Entourage	"The Dream Team"	Season 4, episode 5
2007	Jericho	"One If by Land"	Season 1, episode 20
2007	Lincoln Heights	"House Arrest"	Season 1, episode 12
2007	Cold Case	"Blackout"	Season 4, episode 13
2006	Grey's Anatomy	"Don't Stand So Close to Me"	Season 3, episode 10
2006	Grey's Anatomy	"The Name of the Game"	Season 2, episode 22
2006	The Wire	"Home Rooms"	Season 4, episode 3
2003	Five Deep Breaths		
2001	Apology		

=== Editor ===
- All We Know of Heaven (2004)
- Where to Find God on Sunday (2000)
- Kiss It Up to God (2000)

=== Writer ===
- Black (TBA)
- Five Deep Breaths (2003)
- Apology (2001)

=== Assistant Director ===
- The Living Silence (2003)
