= Katlynn Simone =

American actress

- Born: October 30, 1995 (age 30); Houston, Texas
- Occupation: Actress
- Years active: 2009–present

Katlynn Simone is an American actress. She is best known for playing Treasure in the music drama series Empire and Brittany Pitts in the comedy drama series The Game.

== Early life ==
Simone was born in Houston, Texas. Her parents sent her to The Ensemble Theatre due to her love for acting. She attended Kinder High School for the Performing and Visual Arts

== Career ==
One of Simones first on-screen appearances was a one off episode of the sitcom The First Family. Her first big role came playing Brittany Pitts in the comedy drama series The Game. She portrayed Bowyn in a recurring role in the drama series The Quad. Her biggest role so far has been playing Treasure in the music drama series Empire. She was promoted to a season regular for season 6. She had a recurring role as Tina on the drama series Blindspot.

== Filmography ==
=== Film ===
Year	Title	Role	Notes
2009	Tryst of Fate	School Student	Short
2018	The Right Thing	Deonna	Short
2019	Sacrifice	Plain Jane	
2024	Rock the Boat 2	Woman	

=== Television ===
Year	Title	Role	Notes
2013	The First Family	Megan	Episode; The First Upset
2011-2015	The Game	Brittany Pitts	17 episodes
2015	Dr. Ken	Dancer #2	Episode; Pilot'
2017	Ray Donovan	Maia	2 episodes
2017-2018	The Quad	Browyn	6 episodes
2018-2020	Empire	Treasure	26 episodes
2023	Blindspotting	Tina	3 episodes
