= Black Habits =

Studio album by D Smoke
- Released: February 7, 2020
- Genre: Hip-hop
- Length: 1:02:05
- Label: WoodWorks
- Producers: Ben Billion$; DJ Battlecat; D.K. The Punisher; D Smoke; Jasbir "Beast" Sehra; J. LBS; Larrance Dopson; Marz; Mike & Keys; Nick Sarazen; Seige Monstracity

D Smoke chronology
| Producer of the Year (2006) | Black Habits (2020) | War & Wonders (2021) |

Professional ratings
Review scores
| Source | Rating |
|---|---|
| AllMusic | 4/5 stars |
| Exclaim! | 9/10 |
| HipHopDX | 4.1/5 |

Black Habits is the debut full-length studio album by American rapper and record producer D Smoke. It was released on February 7, 2020 via Woodworks Records. Production was handled by J. LBS, D.K. The Punisher, Jasbir "Beast" Sehra, Seige Monstracity, Ben Billion$, DJ Battlecat, Larrance Dopson, Marz, Mike & Keys, Nick Sarazen, and D Smoke himself. It fearures guest appearances from SiR, Ari Lennox, Davion Farris, Iguocho, Jackie Gouche, Jill Scott and Snoop Dogg.

In the United States, the album peaked at number 2 on the Heatseekers Albums and received a nomination for a Grammy Award for Best Rap Album.

== Track listing ==
| No. | Title | Producer(s) | Length |
|---|---|---|---|
| 1. | "Morning Prayer" | D Smoke | 1:27 |
| 2. | "Bullies" | DK The Punisher | 4:14 |
| 3. | "No Commas" | J.LBS | 2:56 |
| 4. | "Gaspar Yanga" (featuring Snoop Dogg) | Nick Sarazen; Ben Billion$ | 2:15 |
| 5. | "Top of the Morning" | J.LBS | 3:34 |
| 6. | "Sunkissed Child" (featuring Jill Scott and Iguocho) | DJ Battlecat; Larrance Dopson | 4:21 |
| 7. | "Black Habits I" (featuring Jackie Gouche) | Seige Monstracity | 4:27 |
| 8. | "Fly" (featuring Davion Farris) | MyGuyMars; Mike & Keys | 5:14 |
| 9. | "Seasons Pass" | J.LBS | 4:00 |
| 10. | "Fallin'" | Seige Monstracity | 3:37 |
| 11. | "Lights On" (featuring SiR) | J.LBS | 3:39 |
| 12. | "Real Body" (featuring Ari Lennox) | Jasbir "Beast" Sehra | 3:07 |
| 13. | "Free" | DK The Punisher | 5:02 |
| 14. | "Like My Daddy" | Jasbir "Beast" Sehra | 4:58 |
| 15. | "Closer to God" (featuring SiR) | D Smoke | 4:29 |
| 16. | "Black Habits II" | D Smoke | 4:45 |
| Total length: | | | 1:02:05 |
