= Super Duper Bunny League =

Animated action comedy television series

- Genre: Adventure; Action comedy Superhero
- Based on: Superhero Bunny League by Jamie Smart
- Developed by: Jonny Belt; Robert Scull
- Voices of: Miles J. Harvey; H. Michael Croner; Michaela Dietz; Timothy "Latrice Royale" Wilcots; Ramona Young; Fred Stoller
- Narrated by: Janelle James
- Theme music composer: Cake in Space
- Opening theme: "Super Duper Bunny League!"
- Composers: John Angier; Michael Rubin
- Country of origin: United States
- Original language: English
- No. of seasons: 2
- No. of episodes: 26 (51 segments)

Production
- Executive producers: Jonny Belt; Robert Scull; Anttu Harlin; Joonas Utti
- Running time: 22 minutes (11 minutes per segment)
- Production companies: Scull & Belt; Nickelodeon Animation Studio

Original release
- Network: Nickelodeon
- Release: April 19 – December 27, 2025

Super Duper Bunny League is an animated children's action comedy television series developed by Jonny Belt and Robert Scull, based on Superhero Bunny League by Jamie Smart. First announced in 2022 with a 26-episode order, and originally slated to premiere in 2024, the first two episodes premiered on Nick Jr.'s YouTube channel on February 22, 2025, and premiered on April 19 on Nickelodeon. A second season, which consists of the other thirteen episodes of the first, premiered on October 4.

== Premise ==
Super Duper Bunny League follows a team of rabbits-turned-anthropomorphic superheroes – the leader Stumpy, the huge Derek, the smart Annabelle, the silent Middy, the first officer Bex, and the strong Handsome Steve – as they defend Important City from their archnemesis (and accidental creator) Dr. Fuzzleglove and a rogues' gallery of villains.

== Characters ==
=== Super Duper Bunny League ===
- Stumpy (voiced by Miles J. Harvey) is a jovial, but naive bunny and the leader of the Super Duper Bunny League who possesses elasticity. Stumpy got his name from the stump he lived in before gaining powers.
- Handsome Steven "Steve" (voiced by H. Michael Croner) is the proclaimed handsome bunny who possesses superhuman strength and high-speed flight, but is not very bright. He is Stumpy's best friend, sidekick, and advisor.
- Rebecca "Bex" (voiced by Michaela Dietz) is a bunny who possesses electrical powers, the second-in-command of the Super Duper Bunny League, and the driver of the Carrot Car and the Carrot Jet. Bex is an original character created for the series.
- Derek (voiced by Timothy "Latrice Royale" Wilcots) is a large bunny who possesses the power of growth, allowing him to assume the form of a giant ball. He is best friends with Middy, having gained their powers in the same farm that they originally lived on. A gentle giant, Derek has an affinity with other animals.
- Midnight Bun Bun (Middy) (voiced by Kari Wahlgren as a baby) is a silent and stoic bunny in ninja attire with shadow powers who is the smallest and most fearless of the group. She is best friends with Derek, having gained their powers in the same farm that they lived on.
- Dr. Annabelle (voiced by Ramona Young) is a bunny previously owned by Dr. Fuzzleglove and founder of the Super Duper Bunny League who possesses enhanced intelligence. She is usually shown doing research, inventing things, and giving the other bunnies mission objectives and updates from their base.

=== Antagonists ===
- Dr. Francis Fuzzleglove (voiced by Fred Stoller) is a mad scientist and original owner of Dr. Annabelle who is the main antagonist of the series. He is the one who accidentally gave the Super Duper Bunny League their powers and anthropomorphic forms when he set his grilled cheese maker invention to the Super Duper setting. Fuzzleglove lives in a lighthouse, but has dabbled in setting up a secret evil lair.
  - Fuzzbot (voiced by Arnie Pantoja) is Dr. Fuzzleglove's robot henchman.
- Lord Sourman (voiced by Robin Atkin Downes) is an evil wizard who induces sour spells on everyone. He was accidentally reanimated from his petrified prison when a part of his staff was reunited with the staff by a miniature golf course worker.
  - Sourbreath is Lord Sourman's sour-breathing dragon.
- Doc Choc (voiced by Flula Borg) is a chocolatier whose special pastry gun can encase people in chocolate.
- Lizard Lips (voiced by Patton Oswalt) is a humanoid lizard scientist and self-proclaimed "Master of Dinosaurs" who posed as an "ordinary scientist" to work on a time machine.
- Captain Stickybeard (voiced by Carol Kane) is the pirate captain of a group of space pirates that target sweets.
- Auntie Freeze/Louise (voiced by Jaime Moyer) is a scientist who plotted to use her formula to freeze the world over the fact that she is a terrible swimmer.
  - Auntie Arctica (voiced by Jaime Moyer) is the twin sister of Auntie Freeze who operates in Antarctica.
- The Tentacle Monster (vocal effects provided by Chris Phillips) is a gigantic squid-like monster who attacked from underground.
- Litterbug (voiced by Chris Phillips) is an anthropomorphic cockroach who commits acts of littering.
- Professor Sourpuss (voiced by H. Michael Croner) is an anthropomorphic cat who is an inmate at Happy Camp.
- The Stank Monster (vocal effects provided by Fred Tatasciore) is a radioactive odor monster fueled by stank.
- The Dust Bunnies are sentient, 3D printed dust bunnies who resemble gray bunnies. They turn evil after Handsome Steve's milkshake spilled on the printer they came from, though one named Dusty remains docile.
- Mrs. Fuzzleglove/Mrs. Rubberglove (voiced by Laraine Newman) is a lunch lady-themed villain with food-based weaponry and the mother of Dr. Fuzzleglove.
- Smarty (voiced by Darin De Paul) is a mobile app that was created by Dr. Annabelle and fell into the possession of Dr. Fuzzleglove, who places it in a robot body to serve as a replacement for Fuzzbot. Due to Dr. Annabelle and Dr. Fuzzleglove fighting for control over it, Smarty turns evil, prompting a truce between the Super Duper Bunny League and Dr. Fuzzleglove to destroy him.
- The Great Kleptony (voiced by Tony Hale) is an evil magician who uses his magic tricks to rob people.
- Dr. Patootie (voiced by Andrew Kishino) is a villain who makes toys called "Cutie Patooties" that hypnotizes people with his Cutentizer Weapon so that he can "cutentize" the entire world.
- Nimbus and Surly (voiced by Cyrus Arnold and Kittie Kaboom) are two ghosts who were trapped in a haunted house for over a hundred years.
- Gobbler (voiced by Piotr Michael) is a turkey-themed villain who can turn anyone into turkeys with his Baster Blaster.
- The Lava Monster (vocal effects provided by Chris Phillips) is a lava monster created by Mimi Muumuu from some lava through a special lava lamp.
- The Supreme Commander (voiced by Phill Lewis) is a planet-destroying alien who plotted to turn Earth into butterscotch pudding.
  - Fizzlor (voiced by Sean Giambrone) is the Supreme Commander's assistant.
- Rubber Dougie (voiced by Craig Robinson) is a rubber ducky fanatic who has been nicknamed the "Bully of Bathtime". He wields a Bubble Trouble Blaster, which emits bubbles that obey his commands.
- The Sandy Lord of Sand (voiced by Nick Shakoour) is a Sphynx cat-like villain from Ancient Egypt with power over sand.
- Frog Face (voiced by Joey Diaz) is a giant frog villain. He wields the technology that turns humans into flies that he can prey off of.
  - Flymacher (voiced by Connor Ratliff) is the human henchman of Frog Face.
- Frau Whatsherface (voiced by Donna Lynne Champlin) is a master of disguise who utilizes masks.
- King Kneehigh (voiced by Clarke Thorell) is the ruler of the sock monkeys of Sock World who uses missing socks to control people.
- Robot Monkey (vocal effects provided by Chris Phillips) is a giant cymbal-banging monkey toy-themed robot.
- Laser Bear (vocal effects provided by Fred Tatasciore) is an anthropomorphic brown bear with laser-shooting sunglasses and flight.
- Hoot'n Annie (voiced by Amy Sedaris) is an owl-themed human who dislikes sunlight. She also calls the people of Important City "Sun Worshipers".
  - Varmint (voiced by Cole Escola) is Hoot'n Annie's raccoon sidekick.
- Long Tall Sally (voiced by Edi Patterson) is a long-legged outlaw cowgirl. She wields a Cactus Blaster that turns anyone into cactuses.
  - The Cactus Outlaws (voiced by Kevin Michael Richardson and Lew Temple) are the lasso-wielding henchmen of Long Tall Sally.
- The Jellyfish Monster (vocal effects provided by Jonny Belt) is a giant-size jellyfish who slings jelly.
- Greazy Granny (voiced by Jackie Hoffman) is an elderly grease-themed biker who uses grease in her crimes.
  - Grease Ball is Greazy Granny's octopus sidekick.

=== Other characters ===
- The Narrator (voiced by Janelle James) is a voice who narrates the episodes, says the episode's titles, and makes commentary about what is happening.
- Mayor Gigglebottom (voiced by Krizia Bajos) is the mayor of Important City.
  - Yolanda "Yoyo" Gigglebottom (vocal effects provided by Cristina Milizia) is Mayor Gigglebottom's child.
- The Happy Camp Counselor (voiced by Sirena Irwin) is an unnamed camp counselor at Happy Camp where all the apprehended villains are sent to.
- Phil (voiced by Chris Phillips) is the boss of Important City Laboratories.
- Bigfoot (voiced by Fred Tatasciore) is a cryptid that lives in Important National Forest.
- Awesome Guy (voiced by Patrick Warburton) is a man named Guy who acts like a superhero for minor rescues and enormously large "muscles". Stumpy fell for this act. He was exposed by the other Super Duper Bunny League members following a fight with the Tentacle Monsters.
- Kanga Ruiner (voiced by Leigh Joel Scott) is an anthropomorphic koala who rides around in a giant robotic kangaroo called the Mecha-Roo and was ruining things in Sandy Harbor, Australia. After being given Handsome Steve's friendship bracelet, Kanga Ruiner stopped being a bad guy as he never had a friend before.
- Alberto (voiced by Danny Trejo) is a food truck owner who sells tacos.
- The Aliens (vocal effects provided by Fred Tatasciore) are an unidentified green-skinned alien race who are mistaken as villains due to Dr. Annabelle having a delay trying to get her translator to translate the alien languages, but only came to Earth for Alberto's tacos.
- Big Bunny (voiced by Robert Scull) is a giant rabbit that lives in Big Bunny Mountain.
- The Rock Guys (voiced by Debra Wilson and John Eric Bentley) are a duo of rock monsters that often fight over what the other one wants.
- Queen of Atlantic City (voiced by Sirena Irwin) is the fish-like ruler of Atlantic City.
  - Blub Blub is a piscine humanoid who is the royal advisor to the Queen of Atlantic City.
- Agent Delicata (voiced by Brian Sommer) is a government agent who enlists the Super Duper Bunny League to protect Madame President from the Gobbler.
- Captain Curmudgeon and Captain Graybeard (voiced by Toni Ann De Noble and Roger Craig Smith) are two elderly pirates who show up in Important Bay to look for their pet Treasure.
  - Treasure (vocal effects provided by Jonny Belt) is a giant lobster-like sea monster owned by Captain Curmudgeon and Captain Graybeard.
- Mimi Muumuu (voiced by Kether Donohue) is a woman on a tropical island who tried to use a special lava lamp to make a lava monster to drive away the slushy drinkers and plotted to lure Bex to the island to power the lava lamp. She would regret her action after spending time with Bex.
  - Flip-Flop is Mimi Muumuu's silent business partner.
- The Fire Chief (voiced by Kevin Michael Richardson) is the unnamed chief of Important City's Fire Department.
- Gar Gar the Destroyer (voiced by Ryan Bartley) is a short insectoid alien in a large four-armed suit who plotted to destroy Earth if he won against someone against Space Ping-Pong as he wanted to someone to play Space Ping-Pong with.
- The Oggneggs are a race of aliens who tried to steal the Christmas magic until the Super Duper Bunny League set them straight.
  - Oggnegg Captain (voiced by Wallace Shawn) is the unnamed captain of the Oggnegg spaceship.
  - The Oggnegg Crew Members (voiced by Robbie Daymond and Debra Wilson) are the crew members of the Oggnegg spaceship.
- Bunny (voiced by Jo Firestone) is a human dressed as a bunny with a built-in laser pointer to pass off her laser abilities when claiming to be the seventh long-lost member of the Super Duper Bunny League.

== Production ==
Super Duper Bunny League was announced on June 16, 2022, and 26 episodes were ordered for the first season. The series is produced by Nickelodeon Animation Studio. Writing took place during the pandemic, and the animation was done by Gigglebug Entertainment in Finland. The series was originally slated to premiere in 2024, but was later rescheduled to 2025. On February 20, 2025, it was announced that the second half of the first season would be split into a second season.

== Series overview ==
Season	Episodes	Segments	Originally released	
Season	Episodes	Segments	First released	Last released
1	13	26	April 19, 2025	September 27, 2025
2	13	25	October 4, 2025	December 27, 2025

== Episodes ==
=== Season 1 (2025) ===
No. overall	No. in season	Title	Written by	Original release date	Prod. code	U.S. viewers (millions)
1	1	"Super Duper Bunnies!"	Jonny Belt & Robert Scull	February 22, 2025 (YouTube) April 19, 2025 (Nickelodeon)	113	0.18
1	1	"Ye Olde Sourbreath!"	Sara E.B. Osman, Jonny Belt, & Robert Scull	February 22, 2025 (YouTube) April 26, 2025 (Nickelodeon)	113	0.18
Dr. Fuzzleglove makes a grilled cheese machine, but things go awry as he accidentally sets it to the "Super Duper" setting, creating a powerful blast, resulting in six ordinary bunnies all over Important City becoming anthropomorphic and receiving superpowers. Afterwards, Dr. Annabelle, the bunny with intelligence that was originally owned by Dr. Fuzzleglove, finds Stumpy (who was unnamed at the time) and takes him to meet the other bunnies, Handsome Steve with the power to fly, Midnight Bun Bun with shadow powers, Bex with electric powers, and Derek with the power to grow. The bunnies give Stumpy his name since he used to live by a stump in a park, but is unaware of what power he has. The bunnies go to get tacos for the first time, but is approached by Dr. Fuzzleglove, demanding them to join him in evil, but they blatantly ignore him. He showcases his mind-controlling helmet and gets a large sea monster to mess with their lunch, setting the bunnies (except Stumpy) up for their first fight. However, they fail and get captured. Just as the sea monster begins to smush the bunnies, Stumpy stretches his arms and grabs the sea monster's tentacle, realizing his power is elasticity. After too getting captured, Stumpy distracts Fuzzleglove and steals his helmet and making the sea monster flick him far away. The bunnies celebrate Stumpy's new powers and are applauded by the citizens of Important City as the Super Duper Bunny League. With his super strength, Handsome Steve struggles to get the miniature golf ball into the hole. Later on, a worker finds the missing part of a staff held by a wizard sculpture. When he puts the part together, the wizard, named Lord Sourman, comes to life and seeks vengeance by "souring" Important City with his dragon Sourbreath. The Super Duper Bunny League try to stop him but his sourness is too powerful. It's all up to Handsome Steve to get the "Sourstone" off of the staff before Important City is soured forever.
2	2	"Chocolate Bunnies!"	David Brant, Jonny Belt, & Robert Scull	April 19, 2025	106	0.08
2	2	"Clock-a-Doodle-Doo!"	Tony Desimone, Jonny Belt, & Robert Scull	April 26, 2025	106	0.08
During Important City's annual Easter egg hunt, local chocolatier Doc Choc invites the Super Duper Bunny League to be the subject of his latest chocolate statue except for Dr. Annabelle. He plans to chocolatize everyone in retaliation of him not getting to any Easter eggs in his youth. It ends up being a trap and Annabelle needs to use her smarts to save the egg hunt, stop Doc Choc, and rescue her friends. When Bex's late night basketball games leaves her feeling tired, Dr. Annabelle gives her a robotic rooster alarm clock to wake her up early. However, the robot absorbs her electricity powers when she zaps it and it starts terrorizing the city, forcing the League to confront it before it drains the city's power and becomes unstoppable.
3	3	"Lizard Lips!"	Jonny Belt & Robert Scull	May 3, 2025	101	0.07
3	3	"Space Pirates!"	Jonny Belt & Robert Scull	May 3, 2025	101	0.07
Stumpy is practicing throwing out the first pitch at the upcoming Important City baseball game with help from Bex. Posing as an "ordinary scientist" at Important City Laboratories, Lizard Lips creates a time machine which he uses to summon a Tyrannosaurus to serve as his mount in his plans to take over the world. Today is Derek's birthday as Stumpy, Bex, Handsome Steve, and Middy are out doing a cupcake run. However, the cupcakes are soon pillaged by a group of space pirates led by Captain Stickybeard. While Derek is busy, the other Super Duper Bunny League members head into outer space to thwart Captain Stickybeard even though Dr. Annabelle didn't put in a steering wheel for their space ship.
4	4	"Auntie Freeze!"	Sammie Crowley, Jonny Belt, & Robert Scull	May 10, 2025	102	N/A
4	4	"Goin' Camping!"	Rachel Lewis, Alex Fox, Jonny Belt, & Robert Scull	May 10, 2025	102	N/A
It's the hottest day in Important City as the Super Duper Bunny League works to find a way to keep cool. At Important City Laboratories, a scientist named Louise secretly works on a special formula where her supervillain identity of Auntie Freeze can use it to power her freeze ray to freeze the world. With most of the Super Duper Bunny League frozen, only Bex and Dr. Annabelle can defeat Auntie Freeze. Dr. Annabelle takes the Super Duper Bunny League camping in Important National Forest. As an added bonus, she gives her teammates a sunblock-like invention called Powerblock which temporarily negates their superpowers. During their camping experience, Dr. Annabelle tells the story of Bigfoot living at the top of Eaglehead Mountain as her teammates lack any and all interest in camping. The next day, Dr. Annabelle's missing causing Stumpy, Bex, Handsome Steve, Derek, and Middy to think that Bigfoot abducted her and they attempt to save her and find Bigfoot.
5	5	"Awesome Guy!"	Katie Chilson, Jonny Belt, & Robert Scull	May 17, 2025	103	0.11
5	5	"Cheese Zombies!"	Jonny Belt, & Robert Scull	May 17, 2025	103	0.11
While they're going out for ice cream, the Super Duper Bunny League encounters a supposed superhero named Awesome Guy who saves a kid's ice cream treat from melting. Stumpy thinks that it's a good idea to accept help from another superhero, but his teammates have their doubts. Stumpy will be proven right when Awesome Guy is not set for high level dangers and the former finds that a giant squid is attacking Important City. The rest of the Super Duper Bunny League arrive where they help defeat the giant squid and expose Awesome Guy to Important City's citizens. After defeating Litterbug and sending him to Happy Camp, the Super Duper Bunny League are planning their lunches and it happens to be Stumpy's turn to pick what they have. Due to being indecisive, Stumpy does an eeny, meeny, miny, moe trick and lands on cheese. When the Super Duper Bunny League head to the Cheese District of Important City to investigate some strange happenings, they discover that Dr. Fuzzleglove had invented the Fromage-inator to bring the cheese to life as cheese zombies. Now the Super Duper Bunny League must find a way to stop the cheese zombies and defeat Dr. Fuzzleglove.
6	6	"Bad Hare Day!"	Gina Godfree, Jonny Belt, & Robert Scull	May 24, 2025	104	N/A
6	6	"Kanga Ruiner!"	Drew Champion, Jacob Moffat, Jonny Belt, & Robert Scull	May 24, 2025	104	N/A
Dr. Fuzzleglove has invented a mechanical storm cloud called the Precipitator to rain on the Super Duper Bunny League's parade. Because Fuzzbot pointed out that Handsome Steve can fly, he and Fuzzleglove pose as barbers to give Handsome Steve a bad haircut which leaves him depressed. As the Super Duper Bunny League goes on without him, Dr. Fuzzleglove activates the Precipitator. Dr. Annabelle must find a way to get Handsome Steve to get over his bad haircut so that the Super Duper Bunny League can destroy the Precipitator and defeat Dr. Fuzzleglove. Stumpy has made friendship bracelets for the Super Duper Bunny League. They soon get a distress call from Sandy Harbor, Australia where a koala named the Kanga Ruiner and his giant Mecha-Roo are ruining everything. Because Dr. Annabelle took the Carrot Jet apart to work on a new engine that runs on carrots, the Super Duper Bunny League have no choice but to fly commercial to Australia. Handsome Steve flies to Australia and ends up having to hold off the Mecha-Roo until his teammates arrive.
7	7	"The Stank Monster!"	Megan Gonzalez, Jonny Belt, & Robert Scull	May 31, 2025	105	0.13
7	7	"Space Tacos!"	Eric Shaw, Jonny Belt, & Robert Scull	May 31, 2025	105	0.13
It is Cleaning Day at the Super Duper Bunny League's headquarters. Everyone does their job to spruce up the team's headquarters. However, Stumpy's cape is smelling bad and he can't seem to smell it. When his teammates want the cape cleaned, he tries to hide it by putting it in a container holding a radioactive chemical that Stumpy mistakes for Dr. Annabelle's mini-fridge. This results in the creation of a Stank Monster that goes on a rampage throughout Important City by sucking in all the bad odors it can find. Stumpy takes his teammates to a taco food truck run by Alberto. After his teammates enjoy their tacos, Stumpy learns from Alberto that he is closing down his food truck due to its bad shape and lack of customers. Stumpy leads his teammates into refurbishing the food truck and attract plenty of customers. Handsome Steve overshoots one taco out of a taco cannon which goes into outer space and ends up being discovered by a spaceship full of aliens that make their way to Earth. The Super Duper Bunny League work to delay the approaching spaceship until Dr. Annabelle can get her language translator working.
8	8	"Awesome Possum!"	Patrick Rieger, Jonny Belt, & Robert Scull	June 7, 2025	107	0.09
8	8	"Baby Yoyo!"	Andi Shu Hester, Jonny Belt, & Robert Scull	June 7, 2025	107	0.09
One night in Important City, Dr. Fuzzleglove works on another grilled cheese maker only for Fuzzbot to identify it as a waffle maker. This experiment with the waffle maker turns Dr. Fuzzleglove into an opossum which enables him to come up with a way to sneak into the Super Duper Bunny League's headquarters. He takes advantage of Derek's fondness of cuddly animals after he had previously been reprimanded for bringing a bat into the team's headquarters. As Derek hides the fact that he snuck another animal into the Super Duper Bunny League's headquarters, Dr. Fuzzleglove reaches his grilled cheese maker and upgrades his opossum form to become Awesome Possum. During a fight with Dr. Fuzzleglove and his potato cannon, Bex's powers fail to work. Dr. Fuzzleglove gets away while his flying saucer vehicle gets confiscated. Upon analyzing Bex, Dr. Annabelle suggests she takes some time to relax. Just then, the Super Duper Bunny League are visited by Mayor Gigglebottom who wants them to babysit her little girl Yolanda "Yoyo". While Stumpy and Handsome Steve take a liking to Yoyo, Bex is unable to. She works to get her powers working again despite disobeying Dr. Annabelle's own orders to relax. Meanwhile, Dr. Fuzzleglove visits Important City Supermarket to restock his potato cannon. When he attacks again, Bex must help Yoyo when the flying saucer she was riding in is reclaimed by Dr. Fuzzleglove.
9	9	"Dust Bunnies!"	Kristin Jarrett, Jonny Belt, & Robert Scull	June 14, 2025	108	0.09
9	9	"Mrs. Fuzzleglove!"	Eric Shaw, Jonny Belt, & Robert Scull	June 14, 2025	108	0.09
After her teammates had made a mess while making milkshakes, Dr. Annabelle has used a dust bunny sample and her 3-D Printer to invent a dust bunny servant on a friendly and helpful level. While Dr. Annabelle and her dust bunny are out shopping for hats, the others use the invention to make dust bunnies to help clean up the place. During a milkshake party, a combination of Derek's dance moves and the milkshake that Handsome Steve left on top of the invention causes the milkshake to spill and turn the dust bunnies evil. When they continue to multiply, the Super Duper Bunny League must ask for help from Dr. Annabelle and the dust bunny that she named "Dusty" in order to deal with the rogue dust bunnies. While watching a news story about the Super Duper Bunny League having defeated a lunch lady-themed villainess who goes by the name of Mrs. Rubberglove and confiscating her food truck as she gets away, Dr. Fuzzleglove gets a call from his mother stating that she is in town. As Dr. Fuzzleglove hasn't told her that he is a villain, Fuzzbot advises Dr. Fuzzleglove to have the Super Duper Bunny League teach him how to be good. Dr. Fuzzleglove accepts the idea so that he can get close to the food truck itself. He learns different lessons from the Super Duper Bunny League which he manages to accomplish. When it comes to meeting with his mother at Important Diner which is near the garbage dump that the food truck is going to be dropped off at, Dr. Fuzzleglove plans to admit that he is a villain and is unaware of his mother's own dark secret.
10	10	"Fuzzbot!"	Jake Goldfine, Jonny Belt, & Robert Scull	September 6, 2025	109	0.19
10	10	"Top Secret Notebook!"	Kristin Jarrett, Jonny Belt, & Robert Scull	September 6, 2025	109	0.19
Dr. Annabelle has invented a mobile app named Smarty to help her out. She soon loses her phone and it falls into the hands of Dr. Fuzzleglove. He uses the Smarty app to build a new robot as an improvement for Fuzzbot as Smarty takes control of the robot body. They engage in different activities until they run into Dr. Annabelle. Dr. Fuzzleglove and Dr. Annabelle struggle to reclaim Dr. Annabelle's phone causes Smarty to become Evil Smarty. Now the Super Duper Bunny League and Dr. Fuzzleglove must work together to defeat Smarty. Dr. Annabelle has made a super duper notebook which she tells her teammates about during Waffle Wednesdays. Derek realizes that he has to return his library books and accidentally snatches Dr. Annabelle's super duper notebook. When this is made known, the Super Duper Bunny League must work to reclaim the super duper notebook without disturbing the patrons and displeasing the librarian. When Dr. Fuzzleglove hears about this when Bex gets thrown out, he ends up silently competing against the remaining members to claim the super duper notebook.
11	11	"The Great Kleptony!"	Patrick Rieger, Jonny Belt, & Robert Scull	September 13, 2025	110	0.06
11	11	"Fuzzleglove's Lair!"	Patrick Rieger, Jonny Belt, & Robert Scull	September 13, 2025	110	0.06
At the Super Duper Bunny League's headquarters, Stumpy works on his magic tricks for his teammates which don't go the way they hope. Meanwhile, a magician called The Great Kleptony comes to town and uses his magic tricks to rob people of his stuff. Seeing Stumpy's powers in action, The Great Kleptony hires him to be his assistant at Handsome Steve's suggestion and hypnotizes him into stealing stuff for him. When Handsome Steve, Bex, Derek, and Middy see Stumpy in a hypnotized state, they try to intervene only for The Great Kleptony to "make them disappear". It's up to Dr. Annabelle to unhypnotize Stumpy so that he can defeat The Great Kleptony, free his teammates, and return everyone's stuff. Dr. Fuzzleglove's lighthouse hideout is in bad shape and is in the range of where the Super Duper Bunny League are having a beach day at Important Beach. Displeased with these conditions, Dr. Fuzzleglove orders Fuzzbot to find him a more suitable lair. When they get a mountainside lair, Dr. Fuzzleglove and Fuzzbot send invites to the other known villains. Dr. Annabelle learns of Dr. Fuzzleglove's new lair and sends her teammates to do a stakeout as they are not invited. When the other villains don't show up with Fuzzbot claiming that they might be stuck in traffic, the Super Duper Bunny League enter the house and are given a housewarming gift where an incident with the control tablet causes an Armageddon-type lockdown mode to occur and a strange liquid that is said to be worse than lava starts pouring in.
12	12	"Big Bunny!"	Jeff D'Ella, Jonny Belt, & Robert Scull	September 20, 2025	111	0.09
12	12	"Pretzel Twist!"	Caitlin Hodson, Jonny Belt, & Robert Scull	September 20, 2025	111	0.09
At the Important City Carnival, Stumpy tries to win a plush of Derek. At the same time, Handsome Steve plays the high striker where he accidentally sends the bell flying towards Big Bunny Mountain. This awakens a giant rabbit who comes out of his cave and wanders away from it. Derek ends up stumbling upon it as Big Bunny snatches him. Big Bunny's wandering through Important City sends the people in a panic. The Super Duper Bunny League must work to save Derek from Big Bunny and get it back to Big Bunny Mountain. The Super Duper Bunny League has done a soft pretzel run. When Dr. Annabelle gets her soft pretzel, she finds that her teammates already ate theirs on the ride back. With them wanting a bite of Dr. Annabelle's soft pretzel, Dr. Annabelle uses a drilling capsule to preserve her pretzel for later. It drills deep underground where it ends up in the lair of two feuding rock monsters as they each try to claim it as their own. When the fight reaches the surface, Dr. Annabelle and the rest of the Super Duper Bunny League must come up with a plan to save Dr. Annabelle's pretzel and defeat the feuding rock monsters.
13	13	"Cutie Patooties!"	Kristin Jarrett, Jonny Belt, & Robert Scull	September 27, 2025	112	0.07
13	13	"Queen Bex!"	Jake Goldfine, Jonny Belt, & Robert Scull	September 27, 2025	112	0.07
A new toy called Cutie Patooties is taking Important City by storm. Stumpy, Bex, and Handsome Steve go out to get some groceries and end up getting a Cutie Patootie for Derek from Dr. Patootie. Once that was done, Dr. Annabelle finds that the Cutie Patooties run off of the cuteness drawn by those that look at it. Handsome Steve ends up falling for its cuteness as the Cutie Patooties' effects brings Important City to a standstill as Dr. Patootie plans to use his Cutentizer to cutentize the world. When Stumpy, Derek, and Bex fall victim to the Cutie Patooties, Middy is the only one left where she must reluctantly use her cuteness to overload the Cutentizer and defeat Dr. Patootie. While at the beach, Bex is mistaken as the missing Queen of Atlantic City by a fish man named Blub Blub. Stumpy and Handsome Steve go along as they hear how the Queen of Atlantic City had undergone a seaweed mask treatment and accidentally wandered out of Atlantic City where she was snatched by a Seaweed Monster. Bex ends up having to fill in for the Queen of Atlantic City as she tries to put up with the Queen's activities. To get Bex out of them, Stumpy and Handsome Steve take the Royal Submarine to look for the Queen of Atlantic City. When they find the Seaweed Monster near Atlantic City, Stumpy and Handsome Steve must work to deal with the Seaweed Monster even when it gets into Atlantic City.

=== Season 2 (2025) ===
No. overall	No. in season	Title	Written by	Original release date	Prod. code	U.S. viewers (millions)
14	1	"Ghosts!"	Jake Goldfine, Jonny Belt, & Robert Scull	October 4, 2025	206	0.06
14	1	"The Gobbler!"	Patrick Rieger, Jonny Belt, & Robert Scull	October 4, 2025	206	0.06
One Fall evening, Dr. Annabelle is flying around her carrot drone. When Handsome Steve takes a turn, he accidentally causes it to fly into a nearby haunted house that is traced to that location by the carrot drone's controller. He and Stumpy go to retrieve it unaware that two ghosts named Nimbus and Surly are awaiting for someone to open the door that has a ghost-proof spell on it so that they can haunt Important City. Thanks to a tactic on Stumpy and Handsome Steve, Nimbus and Surly are now free to haunt Important City and call their ghost friends to assist in the haunting. Now the Super Duper Bunny League must find a way to get the ghosts back to the haunted house before midnight. During the Fall, Important City is hosting the Gobble Gobble Gala which the Madame President will be attending. The Super Duper Bunny League are recruited by Agent Delicata to help find the Gobbler who has revealed his plans to "talk turkey" with the Madame President. Having them pose as members of the waiting staff, Agent Delicata has Stumpy, Derek, Middy, Bex, and Handsome Steve secretly scan the hands of the attendees who match the hand turkey on the letter. They end up doing it with comical outcomes enough that Agent Delicata ends up dismissing them. Derek finds out that the turkey that is being photograph is actually the Gobbler in disguise. When he reveals himself thanks to the Super Duper Bunny League exposing him, the Gobbler uses his Baster Blaster to turn the Madame President and some of the gala attendees into turkeys. The Super Duper Bunny League must work to defeat the Gobbler without getting turned into turkeys.
15	2	"Pirates' Treasure!"	Patrick Rieger, Jonny Belt, & Robert Scull	October 11, 2025	201	0.04
15	2	"The Lava Monster!"	Megan Gonzalez, Jonny Belt, & Robert Scull	October 11, 2025	201	0.04
While spending the day at Important Beach, the Super Duper Bunny League is enjoying some French fries as Middy uses her shadow powers to form a hawk to drive a seagull away. Their beach day gets disrupted when the pirates Captain Curmudgeon and Captain Graybeard show up looking for their treasure. With Dr. Annabelle busy relaxing and listening to their podcasts, the rest of the Super Duper Bunny League have to fight them off. Afterwards, the Super Duper Bunny League have to contend with a lobster-like sea monster that ends up targeting the snack shacks French fries. Now the Super Duper Bunny League must find a way to fend off the sea monster so that they can continue their beach day. On an unnamed tropical island, Mimi Muumuu and her business associate Flip-Flop obtain a special lava lamp which she plans to use to create a lava monster to drive away the slushy drinkers. Unfortunately, the lava lamp doesn't have enough power to cause it to maintain its form. Needing a power source, Mimi Muumuu ends up luring Bex to the island through a contest that she did not enter. The rest of the Super Duper Bunny League come along for the ride. While the rest of the Super Duper Bunny League end up relaxing, Bex ends up taking Mimi Muumuu on different activities. When it comes to powering the lava lamp, Mimi Muumuu starts regretting her actions as the trick on Bex ends up creating the lava monster. Now the Super Duper Bunny League must find a way to keep the vacationers safe and defeat the lava monster.
16	3	"Cool Dudes from Space!"	Jake Goldfine, Jonny Belt, & Robert Scull	October 18, 2025	202	0.12
16	3	"The Legend of Sauce-Squatch!"	Elizabeth Chun, Jonny Belt, & Robert Scull	October 18, 2025	202	0.12
As Stumpy and Handsome Steve are giving out autographs, a UFO carrying an alien race's supreme leader and his assistant Fizzler arrives in Important City Desert with plans to destroy the planet. Unfortunately, their UFO gets towed for parking in a no parking zone and gets taken to a secret military base. To get into the secret military base, the Supreme Leader and Fizzler trick Handsome Steve into thinking they are part of the Cool Club and have him do some initiations in order to get in so that they can break into the secret military base and reclaim the UFO. When Handsome Steve gets double-crossed, Stumpy must save him and help the Super Duper Bunny League defeat the aliens before the Earth is turned into butterscotch pudding. Following a disastrous fight with the Super Duper Bunny League, Dr. Fuzzleglove gives up on being a villain and gets a job as a bus boy at the chicken nugget restaurant Dippy Nuggets. While there, he sees the Super Duper Bunny League dining there as Dr. Annabelle's new dipping sauce invention does not taste well to the others. They also talk about the legend of the Sauce-Squatch where anyone who dips a chicken nugget into all the dipping sauces becomes one and it is invincible. Dr. Fuzzleglove quits his job and steals the dipping sauces. Taking one chicken nugget, he dips it into barbecue sauce, ranch sauce, honey mustard, and umami ketchup where Dr. Fuzzleglove transforms into the Sauce-Squatch who attacks the Super Duper Bunny League. When Dr. Fuzzleglove's Sauce-Squatch form proves too much for the Super Duper Bunny League, Handsome Steve ends up becoming a Sauce-Squatch to even the odds.
17	4	"Bath Time for Bunnies!"	Magda Liois, Jonny Belt, & Robert Scull	October 25, 2025	203	N/A
17	4	"The Pharaoh's Lunchbox!"	Caitlin Hodson, Jonny Belt, & Robert Scull	October 25, 2025	203	N/A
If there's one thing the Super Duper Bunny League's headquarters has, its one bathroom which Handsome Steve hogs to play with his rubber ducky Super Ducky. At Important City Reservoir, Rubber Dougie uses his Bubble Trouble Blaster to have the bubbles abduct all the rubber duckies in Important City so that he can bathe with them. Because of this, nobody can take a bath without them. With Super Ducky among the rubber duckies that are abducted, the Super Duper Bunny League must work to fight their way passed the bubbles, reclaim the rubber duckies, and defeat Rubber Dougie. At the Important City Museum, it has a new Egyptian exhibit dedicated to Pharaoh Nicetus. Legend says that he was a polite pharaoh who was friendly to everyone and used his special lunchbox to imprison the evil Sandy Lord of Sand. If anyone reads the certain hieroglyphics, the Sandy Lord of Sand will be free and resume his sand-based havoc. When Dr. Annabelle translates the hieroglyphics to the Super Duper Bunny League, she unknowingly frees the Sandy Lord of Sand. He begins his plans to fill Important City with sand and becomes a hassle for the Super Duper Bunny League. Dr. Annabelle must find the magic words that will reopen the lunchbox so that the Sandy Lord of Sand can be re-imprisoned before all of Important City is covered in sand.
18	5	"Auntie Arctica!"	Leore Berris, Jonny Belt, & Robert Scull	November 1, 2025	204	0.07
18	5	"Space Ping Pong!"	Grant Jossi, Jonny Belt, & Robert Scull	November 1, 2025	204	0.07
Dr. Annabelle gets a call from the Happy Camp counselor who states that Auntie Freeze has built a new freeze ray and has escaped from Happy Camp. Dr. Annabelle tracks Auntie Freeze to Antarctica. As the Super Duper Bunny League head to Antarctica, Auntie Freeze meets up with her sister Auntie Arctica who has a plan to turn anyone into a snow monster that obeys their every command. They managed to capture Derek with a fake penguin and transform him into a snow monster. With the Super Duper Bunny League's powers barely working, they must work to restore Derek to normal and defeat Auntie Freeze and Auntie Arctica. Stumpy is terrible at ping pong where he loses to Middy. Earth is invaded by Gar Gar the Destroyer who plans to destroy Earth. He will only spare it if someone goes up against him in a game of Space Ping Pong. When Stumpy asks what Space Ping Pong is, Gar Gar assumes that Stumpy is volunteering and binds a Space Ping Pong glove with paddle to his left hand. The rest of the Super Duper Bunny League work to train Stumpy for the Space Ping Pong match against Gar Gar the Destroyer where even the montage music doesn't help. When it comes time for the Space Ping Pong match, Dr. Annabelle ends up discovering the truth about Gar Gar the Destroyer that comes in handy for Stumpy.
19	6	"Frog Face!"	Jake Goldfine, Jonny Belt, & Robert Scull	November 8, 2025	205	0.10
19	6	"What's-Her-Face!"	Elizabeth Chun, Jonny Belt, & Robert Scull	November 8, 2025	205	0.10
While out grocery shopping, Derek is looking for the right shampoo to use on his fur. He is approached by a free sample guy who gives him a shampoo that works on both types of fur. What Derek doesn't know is that the free sample guy is actually Flymacher who spiked the shampoo with sneezing juice that would make the Super Duper Bunny League sneezy. This is all part of a plan by his boss Frog Face who dispatches Flymacher to turn Important City's citizens into flies for Frog Face to prey off of. When the spiked shampoo on Derek starts to affect the Super Duper Bunny League's heroics, Dr. Annabelle must find a counter-agent so that Derek can help defeat Frog Face and Flymacher. At the Super Duper Bunny League's headquarters, Dr. Annabelle is looking for her pencil as Stumpy reminds her that she keeps it in her hair. A news report mentions that latest baffling criminal activity caused by the master of disguise Frau Whatsherface. At her lair, Frau Whatsherface begins her plot to get rid of the Super Duper Bunny League by launching them into outer space by posing as Dr. Annabelle. She starts by sending her an email that has her solving a tough math problem. With the real Dr. Annabelle indisposed, Frau Whatsherface lures the Super Duper Bunny League to her hideout and tricks them into sitting in chairs that strap them to a rocket. It's up to the real Dr. Annabelle to rescue her teammates and defeat Frau Whatsherface.
20	7	"Sock Monkeys!"	Jake Goldfine, Jonny Belt, & Robert Scull	November 15, 2025	207	0.07
20	7	"The Switcheroo!"	Jake Goldfine, Jonny Belt, & Robert Scull	November 15, 2025	207	0.07
It is laundry day at the Super Duper Bunny League's headquarters. Unfortunately, Handsome Steve has misplaced his sock which leaves him depressed as his teammates work to cheer him up and try to find replacement socks where Handsome Steve doesn't want his socks replaced. What he doesn't know was that it was stolen by the sock monkeys of Sock World who ware ruled by King Kneehigh. Using Handsome Steve's sock, King Kneehigh plans to control him. Handsome Steve is then controlled into building a giant dryer machine so that the sock monkeys can invade Important City. It's up to the rest of the Super Duper Bunny League to free Handsome Steve and thwart the sock monkey invasion. While making use of their ear massagers, Bex and Handsome Steve fight over the controls and accidentally end up in each other's bodies. Dr. Annabelle works to find a way to repair the ear massagers so that Bex and Handsome Steve can get their bodies back. In the meantime, Important City is attacked by a giant robot monkey. Bex and Handsome Steve struggle to gain control of each other's powers with comical results. When Stumpy, Derek, and Middy are abducted and Dr. Annabelle hasn't finished the repairs, Bex and Handsome Steve must work to master each other's powers so that they can defeat the robot monkey and rescue their teammates before they get crushed into ingredients for a banana cream pie.
21	8	"Baby Middy!"	Jeff D'Ella, Jonny Belt, & Robert Scull	November 22, 2025	209	0.06
21	8	"Mega Chompers!"	Jake Goldfine, Jonny Belt, & Robert Scull	November 22, 2025	209	0.06
As the Super Duper Bunny League are enjoying their time off, Dr. Annabelle tests her de-ripening device on some rotting bananas only for them to end up making the bananas young. Due to a mishap while playing basketball, the de-ripening device ends up de-aging Middy. While Dr. Annabelle works to repair the device, the Super Duper Bunny League get an alert that Laser Bear is attacking Important City. The rest of the Super Duper Bunny League must carry on without Middy. Dr. Annabelle can repair the device and restore Middy to normal. Though Baby Middy ends up learning shadow teleportation and ends up in the middle of the battle. While at the pier, the Super Duper Bunny League are enjoying saltwater taffy. Bex has a loose tooth which falls out. Though Bex's tooth is electric as she plans to place it under her pillow for the tooth fairy. Having watched from his lair, Dr. Fuzzleglove plans to obtain the electric tooth to power a device to destroy the Super Duper Bunny League. He begins to infiltrate the Bunny League Headquarters posing as a tooth fairy using the costume that Fuzzbot has made. When Dr. Fuzzleglove gets the tooth despite Bex waking up, he combines it with the chattering teeth to form the Mega Chompers to fight the Super Duper Bunny League only to lose control of it.
22	9	"Hoot'n Annie!"	Drew Champion, Jacob Moffat, Jonny Belt, & Robert Scull	November 29, 2025	210	0.04
22	9	"Boss of the Jungle!"	Jake Goldfine, Jonny Belt, & Robert Scull	November 29, 2025	210	0.04
At the Super Duper Bunny League's HQ, Stumpy drags his teammates into enjoying the suny weather as Dr. Annabelle comes up with the idea to go to Important City Beach. Meanwhile, Hoot'n Annie and her raccoon henchman Varmint have made Eggs of Darkness at Important Observatory to form darkness around anything. Hoot'n Annie plans to drop it into the Sun and plunge it into darkness. While Dr. Annabelle studies the Eggs of Darkness sample to see how they work and Derek and Middy work to free the trapped "Sun worshippers", Stumpy, Handsome Steve, and Bex go after Hoot'n Annie and Varmit as they work to thwart them before they reach the Sun. Handsome Steve drags his teammates into jungle-themed exercise video game. Meanwhile at Important City Laboratories, its boss Phil accidentally waters a plant with the Juice of the Jungle to transform the plant into a plant monster and him into Phil-O-Dendron. He starts to turn all of Important City into a jungle. The Super Duper Bunny League work to rescue the civilians. In need of a sample of the jungle, Dr. Annabelle has Handsome Steve get a sample of the vine so that she can get to the source of the jungle transformation. The Super Duper Bunny League must work to take down a carnivorous megaflora, undo the jungle transformation, and restore Phil to normal.
23	10	"The Bunnies Save Christmas!"	Jake Goldfine, Jonny Belt, & Robert Scull	December 6, 2025	208	0.06
'Twas the night before Christmas in Important City, the Super Duper Bunny League decorate their headquarters for Christmas as Stumpy is shown to like the Christmas season. Later that night, an alien spaceship from the planet Oggneg arrives. When Christmas Day happens, Stumpy learns that nobody remembers Christmas because the alien Oggneggs led by their captain have stolen all of the Christmas magic except from Stumpy as they target him. Once the rest of the Super Duper Bunny League remember Christmas, they must work to get the Christmas magic back before midnight and set the Oggneggs straight.
24	11	"Long Tall Sally!"	Jake Goldfine, Jonny Belt, & Robert Scull	December 13, 2025	211	0.04
24	11	"Funny Bunny!"	Jake Goldfine, Jonny Belt, & Robert Scull	December 13, 2025	211	0.04
A restaurant called Western Spaghetti has opened in Important City as Stumpy, Handsome Steve, Bex, and Dr. Annabelle. When Stumpy is nicknamed Stretch when proving that he's not a kid, he is advised not to be stretched out too long. This causes Stumpy in his Stretch alias to get attention for his stretched out legs by helping out everyone. Long Tall Sally arrives in town with her Cactus Outlaw henchmen as she uses her Cactus Blaster to turn everyone into cactuses. Stumpy soon learns that Dr. Annabelle was right when he tries to take on Long Tall Sally alone and reaches his limit stretching himself too thin. At Important Beach Park, the Super Duper Bunny League are going to be named the Superhero of the Year as they are the only heroes in Important City. Just then, a new bunny called Bunny arrives in town claiming to be the long-lost seventh member of the Super Duper Bunny League which pleases the civilians. Bunny soon shows off his laser zapping abilities which makes Bex jealous that Bunny is trying to take her place and is just after the award. When purple goo starts showing up, they find it coming from a giant jellyfish. Because of Bunny's laser powers not being strong enough, Bex is the only one who can save everyone.
25	12	"Lizard Lips Returns!"	Jake Goldfine, Jonny Belt, & Robert Scull	December 20, 2025	212	N/A
25	12	"Beta Carrotron!"	Jake Goldfine, Jonny Belt, & Robert Scull	December 20, 2025	212	N/A
At the Super Duper Bunny League headquarters, Dr. Annabelle answers Bex's question on if a dinosaur or a dragon would win in a battle by stating that not all dinosaurs are big. Meanwhile, Dr. Fuzzleglove invents a portal to the future. Unfortunately, he opens a portal to the past where Lizard Lips emerges. With his new Dino-Tizer, Lizard Lips turns Dr. Fuzzleglove into a Tyrannosaurus-like Fuzzlesaurus and himself into a dinosaur. Because the Dino-Tizer needs to be recharged, Fuzzlesaurus form attacks Important City as the Super Duper Bunny League allowing Lizard Lips to infiltrate their base with Dr. Annabelle left behind. The Super Duper Bunny League must work to defeat both villains. Stumpy, Derek, Middy, and Handsome Steve visit Friendly Jake's Milkshake truck while Bex and Dr. Annabelle try out an upgraded Carrot Car with features that can only be used for an emergency. Because Dr. Annabelle forgot to charge it, Bex uses a nearby charging station. During this time, Dr. Fuzzleglove and Fuzzbot arrive where Dr. Fuzzleglove accidentally activates the new features causing Bex and Fuzzbot to go after him. Handsome Steve is sent to help Bex. Unfortunately, Dr. Fuzzleglove accidentally pushes the button that Dr. Annabelle told Bex not to touch as it assumes its robotic Super Duper Defense Mode called Beta Carrotron. Now the Super Duper Bunny League must deal with the Beta Carrotron in order to rescue Bex and Dr. Fuzzleglove.
26	13	"Greazy Granny!"	Jake Goldfine, Jonny Belt, & Robert Scull	December 27, 2025	213	N/A
26	13	"Escape from Happy Camp!"	Jake Goldfine, Jonny Belt, & Robert Scull	December 27, 2025	213	N/A
At the Bunny League Headquarters, the Super Duper Bunny League are starting the day with waffles as Bex isn't much of a morning person and Dr. Annabelle has invented the Super Duper Unslippers that run on Super Duper Batteries. Just then, they get an alert that reveals that Greazy Granny and her sidekick Grease Ball are causing grease-based havoc at Important City Diner. Now she plans to cover all of Important City in grease. The Super Duper Bunny League have a difficult time dealing with Greazy Granny's grease. Now the Super Duper Bunny League must find a way to overcome all the grease in order to defeat Greazy Granny and Grease Ball. At Bunny League Headquarters, the Super Duper Bunny League are preparing for the opening day of Cheese Louise except Bex who hates cheese and stays behind at the headquarters to watch over things while taking a nap. Meanwhile at Happy Camp, Dr. Fuzzleglove escapes and awaits for Fuzzbot to pick him up. With the other Super Duper Bunny League away, Bex plans to apprehend him on her own. She chases him into the forest where they end up stranded in the forest as her communicator is broken in the tumble. Dr. Fuzzleglove tricks Bex into making their way to Sneaky Peak in order to see the Carrot Car from it. This causes Dr. Fuzzleglove to pull all of his tricks on Bex while informing Fuzzbot about a change of plans.

== Reception ==
=== Critical response ===
Ashley Moulton of Common Sense Media rated the series a four-out-of-five stars, stating the series is "super-duper fun, and will appeal to kids and grown-ups alike."

=== Accolades ===
Year	Award	Category	Nominee(s)	Result	Ref.
2026	Children's and Family Emmy Awards	Outstanding Directing for a Preschool Animated Series	Daniel Klein and Jasmi Ritola (for "Auntie Freeze"/"Goin' Camping")	Nominated	
