= Anirudh Pisharody =

American actor and film producer

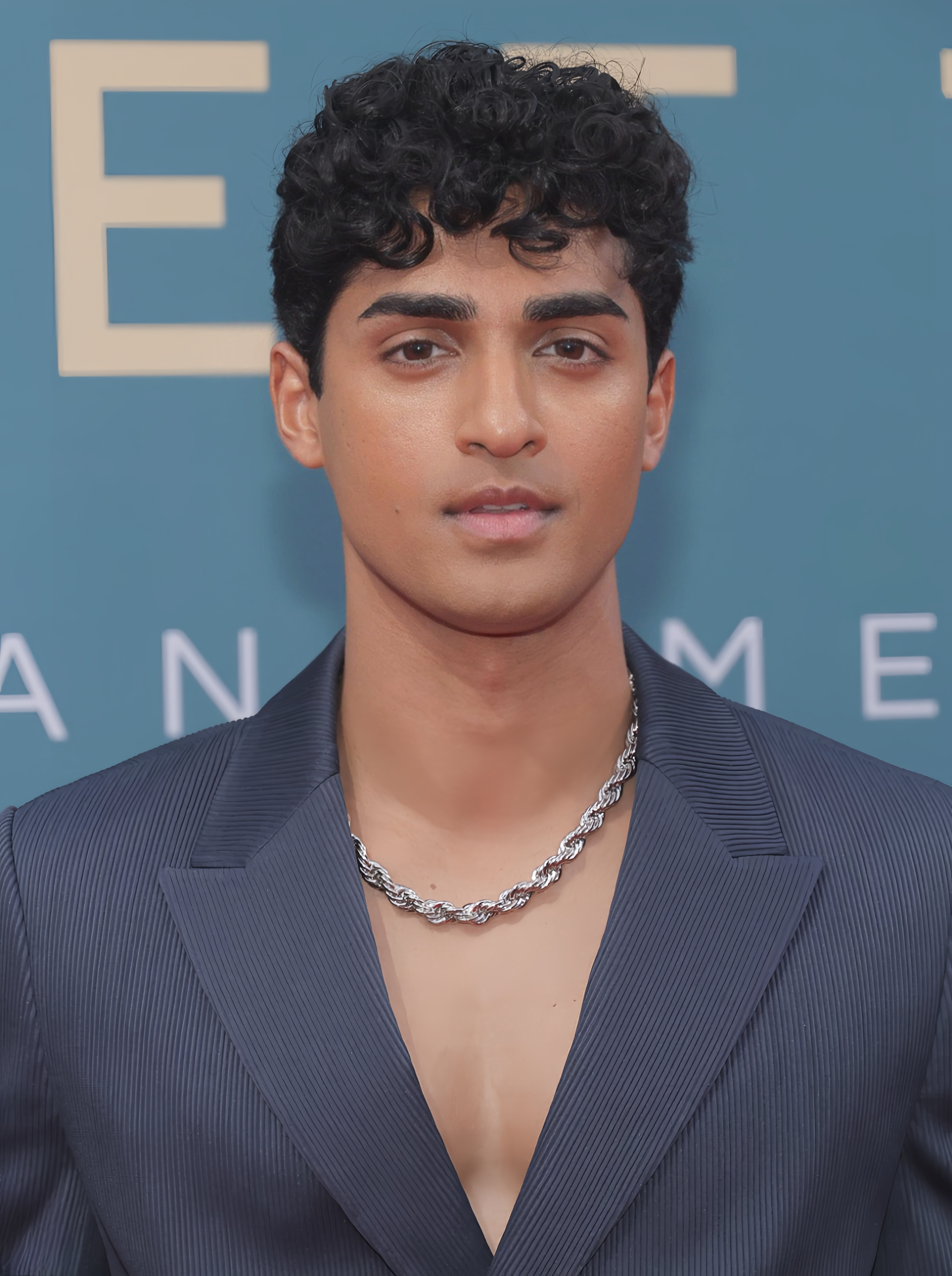
- Born: February 2, 1994 (age 32); India
- Education: University of Texas at Austin (B.S.)
- Occupations: Actor, producer
- Years active: 2017–present
- Spouse: Jill V. Dae (m. 2023)

Anirudh Pisharody (born February 2, 1994) is an Indian-American actor and film producer. He is best known for the role of Nirdesh "Des" in the third season of the Netflix teen comedy series Never Have I Ever. He is also known for his role as the firefighter Ravi Panikkar in the procedural drama 9-1-1.

== Early life and education ==
Anirudh Pisharody was born in India and moved to the United States as a child. He spent much of his childhood in Austin, Texas. Growing up, he developed an interest in acting and regularly participated in middle school and high school theater productions. Following high school, Pisharody initially wanted to study to become a medical doctor. He attended the University of Texas at Austin, where he graduated with a Bachelor of Science degree in Public Health.

After college, he worked briefly in a healthcare job in Washington, D.C. Afterwards, he relocated to Los Angeles in 2017 in the hopes of attending a medical school in Los Angeles. During his time in Los Angeles, he pursued acting professionally and later formalized his training by earning a certificate in film, cinema, and video studies from the University of California, Los Angeles (UCLA).

== Career ==
Pisharody began his acting career taking on roles in short films and making guest appearances on television shows such as The Goldbergs, Last Man Standing, and SEAL Team. He also appeared in the Rogue Warfare independent action film series and in the 2018 film Cerebrum.

In addition to his television and film work, Pisharody has made appearances in several music videos. Early in his career, he was featured as a lead extra in O Fresh's "We Up to Something" featuring Slim Thug (2017) and played the male love interest in Stela Cole's "Lucky Day" (2018). He also portrayed a LARP warrior fighter in a music video for the rock band Punch Punch Kick's track "Licking My Wounds". More recently, he starred as a cast member in the official music video for "Home" by Renzu Music.

Pisharody was a member of the 2020 ABC Discovers Showcase, as one of about a dozen actors from a pool of over several thousand applicants.

In 2021, Pisharody landed a recurring role in the Ryan Murphy-produced drama 9-1-1 as probationary firefighter Ravi Panikkar. In 2026, fans petitioned for Pisharody to become a series regular from Season 9 onwards.

In 2022, Pisharody was cast in the third season of Mindy Kaling's hit Netflix comedy Never Have I Ever. He portrayed Nirdesh "Des," an attractive rival to the main character, Devi (Maitreyi Ramakrishnan). His casting was notable for breaking the traditional mold of the "nerdy sidekick" often associated with male actors of South Asian descent in Hollywood. Pisharody also appeared in the film Unit 234 in 2022.

Alongside acting, Pisharody co-founded the production company Black Velvet Films with his wife, Jill V. Dae.

In August 2025, Pisharody joined the cast of the comedy film Better Life, acting alongside Randall Park and Joel Kim Booster. He was cast in June 2026 to star opposite Tongayi Chirisa in the time-bending thriller Chronos.

== Personal life ==
Pisharody met his wife, Hong Kong-born filmmaker and producer Jill V. Dae, in 2014 while they were both students at the University of Texas at Austin. After navigating a long-distance relationship when they graduated, Pisharody proposed at Hearst Castle in 2019. Following delays due to the COVID-19 pandemic, the couple married in November 2023 at the Castello Orsini-Odescalchi in Bracciano, near Rome, Italy. The wedding featured a Chinese tea ceremony, an Indian kalyanam, and a Western wedding ceremony.

== Filmography ==
=== Television ===
Year	Title	Role	Notes
2018	Totally TV	Aladdin	
2019	The Goldbergs		Guest
2020	Last Man Standing		Guest
2021–present	9-1-1	Ravi Panikkar	Recurring role
2022–2023	Big Sky		Recurring role
2022	Never Have I Ever	Nirdesh "Des"	Recurring (Season 3)

=== Films ===
Year	Title	Role	Notes
2018	Cerebrum	Bruno	
2019	Rogue Warfare		
2019	Rogue Warfare: The Hunt		
2020	Rogue Warfare: Death of a Nation		
2022	Unit 234	Jordan	
TBA	Better Life		
TBA	Chronos		In production

=== Music videos ===
Year	Title	Artist	Role
2017	"We Up to Something"	O Fresh (feat. Slim Thug)	Producer
2018	"Lucky Day"	Stela Cole	Male Love Interest
2024	"Home"	Renzu Music	Male Lead

=== Theater ===
Year	Title	Venue
2021	An Evening Repast	The Morgan-Wixson Theater
