= List of Z Nation characters =

Z Nation is an American zombie drama series created by Karl Schaefer and Craig Engler. The series premiered on September 10, 2014, in the United States on the Syfy television network. The following is a list of characters who have appeared in the television series.

== Overview ==
Actor	Character	Seasons				
Actor	Character	1	2	3	4	5
Main characters
Kellita Smith	Lt. Roberta Warren	Main	Main	Main	Main	Main
DJ Qualls	Simon Cruller/Citizen Z	Main	Main	Main	Main	Main
Michael Welch	Mack Thompson	Main	Main			
Keith Allan	Alvin Murphy	Main	Main	Main	Main	Main
Anastasia Baranova	Addison "Addy" Carver	Main	Main	Main	Main	Main
Russell Hodgkinson	Steven "Doc" Beck	Main	Main	Main	Main	Main
Pisay Pao	Cassandra	Main (Note: Pao only appears in one episode of season three, although credited as a main cast member.)	Main	Main		
Nat Zang	Thomas "10K"	Main	Main	Main	Main	Main
Tom Everett Scott	Sgt. Charles Garnett	Main				
Harold Perrineau	Lt. Mark Hammond	Main (Note: Perrineau only appears in the first episode, although credited as a main cast member.)				
Matt Cedeño	Javier Vasquez		Main	Special Guest		
Emilio Rivera	Escorpion		Main	Main		
Joseph Gatt	The Man			Main (Note: Gatt is initially credited as a guest star in season three before being promoted to main cast in the seventh episode.)		
Sydney Viengluang	Sun Mei			Main (Note: Viengluang is initially credited as a guest star in season three before being promoted to main cast in the seventh episode.)	Main	Main
Ramona Young	Kaya		Stand-in	Main (Note: Young is initially credited as a guest star in season three before being promoted to main cast in the seventh episode.)	Main	Main
Natalie Jongjaroenlarp	Red			Main (Note: Jongjaroenlarp is initially credited as a guest star in season three before being promoted to main cast in the fourteenth episode.) (Note: In season 4, Jongjaroenlarp is credited as a guest star in the eleventh episode, but is credited as main cast in all of her other appearances.)	Main	Main
Holden Goyette	"Nature Boy"/5K			Main (Note: Goyette is initially credited as a guest star in season three before being promoted to main cast in only the fourteenth episode.)	Guest	
Grace Phipps	Sgt. Lilly				Main	Main
Henry Rollins	Lt. Mueller				Main	
Tara Holt (Note: Various actresses portrayed Lucy throughout Seasons 2 & 3.)	Lucy Murphy		Guest	Recurring	Main (Note: Holt is initially credited as a co-star in season four before being promoted to main cast in the fourth episode.)	
Katy O'Brian	Georgia "George" St. Clair					Main
Mario Van Peebles	Cooper					Main
Lydia Hearst	Pandora					Main
Recurring characters
Lisa Coronado	Dr. Marilyn Merch	Recurring	Recurring	Recurring		
Wizard	Pup	Recurring	Recurring	Recurring		
Mark Carr	Sketchy McClane	Recurring	Guest	Guest	Guest	Guest
Doug Dawson	Skeezy	Recurring	Guest	Guest	Guest	Guest
Sara Coates	Serena (Note: Coates also portrayed Lucy in the fourth season.)	Guest	Recurring	Guest	Guest	
Donald Corren	Dr. Walter Kurian	Guest	Recurring			
Gina Gershon	La Reina		Recurring			
Darlene Mccarty	Nana			Recurring	Recurring	Recurring
DeRon Brigdon	Wesson			Recurring		Guest
Cecil Cheeka	Kaskae			Recurring		
Aaron Trainor	Will Chaffin			Recurring		
Kathryn Brown	Hope Chaffin			Recurring		
Frank Boyd	Dr. Harold Teller			Guest	Recurring	
Kodiak Lopez	JZ				Recurring	Recurring
Jack Plotnick	Roman Estes					Recurring
Zack Ward	Lt. Dante					Recurring
Emily Shuel	Marjorie					Recurring

== Main characters ==
=== Roberta Warren ===
Lt. Roberta Warren (Kellita Smith) is a survivor of the zombie apocalypse. An ex-National Guard member activated out of Missouri, she is a member of the Westward-bound survivor group, and a former member of the Blue Sky Camp survivor group in New York. Like many other survivors of the zombie apocalypse, Warren lost nearly everything and everyone that mattered to her. She becomes the leader of the survivor group after the death of Garnett.

=== Citizen Z ===
Simon Cruller (DJ Qualls), commonly known as Citizen Z, is a PFC and former hacker who was working at the NSA's Northern Light listening post in the Arctic Circle. After a doomed rescue mission flight out of Northern Light, he becomes the NSA's sole surviving employee and uses his high-tech equipment to assist the group in its journey to California. He also runs a radio broadcast for other survivors, informing people to take cover when there is a threat of inescapable disaster-level weather or zombie hordes. He is slowly going insane from loneliness; his only companion is a sled dog named Pup. In the second season, the Northern Lights missile defense system intercepts a nuclear bomb, severely damaging the listening post and waking the zombies in the doomed evacuation flight wreckage. Citizen Z fights to survive the cold and the zombie onslaught, despite minimal shooting skills. At the end of season 2, Citizen Z decides to leave Northern Light when he realizes that all the post's resources are used up and it has sustained too much damage for him to survive there any longer. He leaves on foot with Pup, pulling a dog sled, in subzero temperatures. Near death, he is rescued by Kaya, an Inuk girl, and her surviving family members. They return to Northern Lights when they need food, and he and Kaya form a relationship, which results in her becoming pregnant. He leaves in a plane and meets the survivor group in person, but later returns.kaya then has her son, JZ .

=== Alvin Murphy ===
Alvin Bernard Murphy (Keith Allan) is a resentful and frail former convict who becomes the only known survivor of zombie bites after being part of a scientific experiment. The Westward-bound survivor group is tasked with transporting him to a government laboratory in California, as his apparent immunity is believed to be the sole solution to the ZN1 virus. Over time, Murphy's appearance changes, and he becomes part zombie. He can communicate with zombies, develops feelings for them and can make them do his bidding. He also becomes more and more misanthropic, going from simply a cowardly jerk with few redeeming moments to an increasingly darker character who even starts to succumb to zombie instincts and does not care about the lives of others to the point where he is willing to abandon the mission. He also develops a special gift: After biting a person or exposing them to his saliva or blood, he can direct them using telepathy. In season 3, after finding out the survivors at Zona want to use him for only themselves, he escapes, bites 10K and decides to make the human race into zombie-human hybrids like himself. He eventually rejoins the group when they find out his daughter Lucy has been kidnapped by The Man. In a fight with the forces of Zona, a bullet passes through him and hits Warren, infecting her with his blood. In season 4 he has been taken to Zona and the doctors have seemingly cured him, making him look more human. After Zona falls, he and Warren return to the mainland and eventually meet up with Lucy, 10K, Doc and Sgt. Lilly. During this season, he demonstrates great concern for Lucy, and is more humane and less harsh than he was in prior seasons, even taking part in killing zombies, though he maintains his pessimism. At the end of season 4 he is struck by flesh eating bacteria when trying to protect Warren.

=== Doc ===
Steven Beck (Russell Hodgkinson), commonly known as Doc, is a former counselor and a recovering addict. He serves as the medic of the Westward-bound survivor group. He is not an actual medical doctor, but has sufficient medical knowledge to aid the members of the group. He holds a Phd in clinical psychology, and has an extensive knowledge of drugs due to his occupation pre-apocalypse and his drug addiction. During the apocalypse he returned to his drug addiction and became a short time drug dealer before engaging on the mission to take Murphy to the CDC Laboratory in California. He is one of the wisest members of the group and serves Warren without hesitation. He develops a fatherly bond with 10k (a.k.a. Tommy) due to his regret of not being supportive of an unrecognized son he had when he was 19, and 10k's trauma after having to mercy his father. He uses two hammers which he keeps in holsters when smashing zombies. His stoner antics is a comic relief in the entire series and at times aids the group in sticky situations.

=== 10K ===
Thomas (Nat Zang), commonly known as 10K and often called "The Kid" by Doc, is the youngest member of the Westward-bound survivor group. In the season 1 finale, his real name was revealed to be Tommy. 10K is quiet, incredibly skilled, a great shot, and very observant. He is highly proficient with a sniper rifle and other projectiles, and is "pretty good with a knife". He loves killing zombies, and keeps track of each one he kills. His goal is 10,000 kills, hence his self-given nickname, and he has already reached 1,000 by his first appearance. His backstory reveals that 10K was forced to kill his father, making a promise to him that he would stay strong and fight. 10K harbors feelings of anger and hatred towards Murphy for turning his lover Cassandra into a zombie-human hybrid, but does not act on those feelings, knowing that Murphy could be humanity's only chance to survive. In the season 2 finale, he is injured and taken with Murphy to the CDC submarine to be given medical attention for his wound. He escapes the submarine with Murphy, Dr. Merch and the others bitten by Murphy, and is openly opposed to following him. He is told by Dr. Merch that he was bitten after she gave him his first dose of the original cure. He stops counting during season 3, but resumes during season 4.

=== Addy Carver ===
Addison Grace "Addy" Carver (Anastasia Baranova) is a former member of the Blue Sky camp in New York and is Mack's girlfriend prior to his death. She is the survivor group's communication specialist and uses her talents with radio equipment to contact Citizen Z. Broken by unresolved trauma, she is slowly being worn down by the apocalypse. At one point, she chooses to leave the group and join the Sisters of Mercy camp, but after the camp is destroyed, she reunites with Mack, who refused to leave her behind, and returns to the Westward-bound survivor group. Her weapon of choice against zombies is a customized metal bat with spikes; in season 3, her bat is upgraded by Sun Mei and her team to emit an electric charge similar to a taser. Between seasons 3 and 4, she loses her right eye. She disappears early in season 4.

=== Mac Thompson ===
Mac Thompson (Michael Welch; seasons 1–2) is a former hockey player for the Tri-City Americans, a survivor of the zombie apocalypse, and Addy's boyfriend. He is a former member of the Blue Sky camp in New York, and a member of the Westward-bound survivor group. A good shot, Mac protects Addy and stays behind when she chose to join the Sisters of Mercy camp, and watches over her from afar. He is eventually reunited with Addy and returns to the survivor group. He is mercied by Addy after being swarmed, and killed by zombies.

=== Cassandra ===
Cassandra (Pisay Pao; seasons 1–2, guest season 3) is a survivor of the initial zombie apocalypse. She is a former member of the Philadelphia cannibal survivor group, where she served as a "lure" to attract male survivors with the promise of sexual trade, in order for the group to trap and consume them. Cassandra joins the Westward-bound survivor group after being found in a locked cage at a rendezvous station near Philadelphia. A leg injury leads to an infection. Lacking antibiotics and near death, she is bitten by Murphy and becomes a zombie-human hybrid controlled by Murphy. She eventually attacks and is mercied by 10K.

=== Charles Garnett ===
Sgt. Charles Garnett (Tom Everett Scott; season 1) was with the National Guard, based out of Georgia, prior to the ZN1 outbreak. He is a former member of the Blue Sky camp in New York before taking on the task of transporting Murphy. He is the leader of the Westward-bound survivor group until his demise. Trying to protect Murphy, he is murdered and turned into a zombie by Priest Jacob and his Resurrection Cult. He is mercied by Warren, his second in command, and at that point, his girlfriend.

=== Mark Hammond ===
Lt. Mark Hammond (Harold Perrineau; season 1) is the last surviving member of the Delta Force team transferring Murphy to a laboratory in California. He is mercied by the Westward-bound survival group after being bitten.

=== Javier Vasquez ===
Javier Vasquez (Matt Cedeño; seasons 2, guest season 3) is first encountered in the opening episode of season 2, "The Murphy". Vasquez was a DEA agent, but after he arrested some of Escorpion's men, Escorpion abducted his wife and daughter, later killing them in front of him. His wife and daughter turned into zombies during their funeral, and Vasquez seeks revenge on Escorpion. He tries to assassinate Escorpion during the group's Zeros induction ceremony, but is stopped by Warren and tortured by the Zeros before escaping. At the conclusion of season 2, he apparently leaves the main survivor group. In the season 3 episode "Heart of Darkness", Vasquez reappears, having assumed the mantle of "Escorpion" after suffering a mental breakdown, and is later mercied by Warren.

=== Escorpion ===
Hector Alvarez (Emilio Rivera; seasons 2–3), commonly known as Escorpion, is the main antagonist of season 2, first encountered in the second episode, "White Light". He served as the right-hand of La Reina, the head of the Mexican drug cartel known as the Zeros. He has a small Z-shaped scar on his right hand and has a tattoo of a face in his forearm. He tortured Javier Vasquez when he was still working for the DEA, and killed the latter's wife and daughter. Escorpion's weapon of choice is a golden gun. At the end of season 2, he has reformed, and joins the main survivor group. In season 3, he is killed by Vasquez, who has assumed his former identity after suffering from a mental breakdown. He is later injected with an experimental vaccine to save his life which was ineffective at first but later on proves effective. However, it is unclear exactly what the vaccine did to him, as he never appears again in the series.

=== The Man ===
The Man (Joseph Gatt; season 3) first appears in One Punch Man. Following a list created by his Zona employer, it is his job to collect people by any means necessary and ship them to Zona. He is ruthless and will take out anyone in his way. He is known to have completely decimated at least two survivor communities to obtain the people on his list. He has a perfect success rate and has yet to lose a target. As of the second episode of season 3, "A New Mission", The Man's current list contains only one name: "Alvin Bernard Murphy". He finally was defeated in the season 3 finale, as he was tackled off of a massive mountain by Addison Carver. Addy luckily survived and the man's horrible reign was put to an end.

=== Sun Mei ===
Sun Mei (Sydney Viengluang; season 3–5) is first encountered in the second episode of season 3, "A New Mission". She is a Laotian virologist from Beijing, China, where 200,000 survived the zombie apocalypse by sealing themselves behind the walls of the Forbidden City. She is sent with a team and equipment from China to collect DNA samples from the American survivor group and Murphy in the hope of synthesizing a cure. She is the sole survivor of her team's mission and for now, has joined the survivor group. In Season 5, she would work in Newmerica as a doctor until her death. She eventually finds the cure in Murphy's blood.

=== Kaiya ===
Kaiya Cruller (Ramona Young; season 3–5) is first encountered in the second episode of season 3, "A New Mission". Kaya is an Inuk girl living with her Uncle Kaskae and her grandmother. They are the sole survivors of their village. She finds Citizen Z and Pup out in a blizzard, rescues them, and takes them to her home. She reveals to Citizen Z that she is a huge fan of his, telling him he needs to get healthy and start broadcasting again. They eventually form a relationship after they return to Northern Lights, and she becomes pregnant with their son, JayZ. It's confirmed in Season 5 that Kaiya and Citizen Z are married but it is not indicated when they got married.

=== Red ===
Red (Natalie Jongjaroenlarp; season 3–5) is a survivor of the zombie apocalypse. She is the guardian of 5K and love interest of 10K. She is later reunited with the group in Newmerica, and has developed a strong friendship with Sun Mei who has been working on an antidote against the zombie virus.

=== Nature Boy / 5K ===
5K (Holden Goyette; season 3, guest season 4), also known as Nature boy, is a survivor of the zombie apocalypse under the protection of Red. He falls off a cliff when he pursues Addy, Lucy, and The Man in the season 3 finale. Red hopes he is still alive somewhere, while 10K believes he is dead.

=== Lucy Murphy ===
Lucy Serena Murphy (Tara Holt; seasons 4, guest seasons 2–3) is the daughter of Murphy and Serena. In season 2 she is a baby, but ages rapidly due to the virus Murphy passes on. In season 3, she ages from someone who looks 5 years old, to preteen, to teenager (and is thus portrayed by multiple actresses). In season 4, she looks like a young adult, and is portrayed by Tara Holt. She is kidnapped by The Man, who tries to bring her to Zona in her father's place, but this is impeded by Addy, who she forms a close bond with, even referring to her as "Aunt Addy".

=== Sgt. Lilley ===
Sgt. Lilley Mueller (Grace Phipps; season 4–5) is Lt. Mueller's daughter, who assists him in running a refugee camp trying to get survivors to Newmerica. After her father's death, she joins the main survivor group. She later sacrifices herself in Newmerica to save 10K by killing several zombies in an explosion.

=== Lt. Mueller ===
Lt. Mueller (Henry Rollins; season 4) is Sgt. Lilley's father, who runs a refugee camp trying to get survivors to Newmerica. He is killed by zombies and mercied by his daughter.

== Recurring Characters ==
- Lisa Coronado as Dr. Marilyn Merch (seasons 1–3)
  Dr. Marilyn Merch is a genetic recombiner and Harvard graduate, skilled in gene splicing. She disappeared two years before the zombie outbreak and resurfaced at the Portsmouth Naval Prison infection lab, where she injected three prisoners, including Murphy, with experimental vaccines. Only one of her vaccines worked which was Murphy's, but the others killed the other two prisoners. Due to a security breach by a horde of zombies, Merch was forced to leave the lab via helicopter. She is later known to be at a lab in Fort Collins, Colorado, where Dr. Kurian claims she "didn't make it". In the season 2 finale, she resurfaces aboard the CDC submarine lab. She escapes the sinking submarine, but is bitten by Murphy and is now controlled by him. She uses small doses of the original cure to regain control of herself. After Murphy finds out, he bites her a second time. To break control for good, Merch walks into a cage of zombies, injects herself with the cure and is then eaten alive by the zombies.
- Mark Carr as Sketchy McClane (season 1–present)
  Sketchy McClane, an old acquaintance of Doc, is a weapons dealer and con artist and travels with his friend Skeezy. They usually appear as comic relief in one episode per season, with the exception of the first, where they appear in two episodes.
- Doug Dawson as Skeezy (season 1–present)
  Skeezy is a weapons dealer and con artist and travels with his friend Sketchy. They usually appear as comic relief in one episode per season, with the exception of the first, where they appear in two episodes.
- Wizard as Pup (seasons 1–3)
  Simon's beautiful husky dog, who he rescued from a dog-sled out in the blizzard and has ever since been Simon's best friend.
- Sara Coates as Serena (seasons 1–2, guest season 3)
  Serena, a tough guard at the Sisters of Mercy camp, is first seen in the 11th episode of season 1, "Sisters of Mercy". She has a brief fling with Murphy outside the camp, resulting in her pregnancy. After the destruction of the Sisters of Mercy, she eventually catches up to Murphy and the Westward-bound survivor group. She dies shortly after giving birth, protecting her baby from a horde of zombies. She is given mercy by Warren at the request of Murphy.
- Donald Corren as Dr. Walter Kurian (seasons 1–2)
  Dr. Walter Kurian, the main antagonist of season 1, is first encountered in episode 13, "Doctor of the Dead". Kurian is revealed to be responsible for the virus known as HZN1, which caused the zombie apocalypse. Working at a lab in Fort Collins, Colorado and using samples he gathered from Krokodil addicts in New York, Ebola camps in Africa, abandoned bioweapons in Kazakhstan, and brain matter from a man in Haiti, he created the "Red Death" virus, meant for use in biological warfare. The virus escaped the lab by infecting a lab technician named Brandon Doyle. From there it spread, and in the resulting chaos, Kurian fled and went underground. The right side of his face appears scarred from the nuclear blast in the season 2 premiere.
- Gina Gershon as La Reina (season 2)
  La Reina, also referred to as "the Queen of the Dead", is first seen in the 12th episode of season 2, "Party With the Zeros". She has inherited the leadership position of the Zeros drug cartel from her deceased husband Gonzalo. Throughout season 2, she and her gang attempt to hunt down "The Murphy" so she can control a cure made by the captured Dr. Kurian, who is now her servant. She dreams of creating a new world order, with her in charge. After Warren appears to save her from an assassination attempt, she offers him a place in her regime. In the season 2 finale, La Reina is killed by Alvarez during a fight between Warren and La Reina.
- Nidhi Ghildayal as Corinne (season 2)
  Corinne is Escorpion's Emilio Rivera right-hand and a member of the Zeros. Loyal, cunning and quick to extreme violence. A sugar skull tattoo covers her face.
- Frank Boyd as Dr. Harold Teller (seasons 3–4)
  A cowardly doctor whose wife got infected with a deadly fungus virus, resulting in her zombie state. Their son was put in a frozen-state inside of a capsule to preserve his life.
- Cecil Cheeka as Kaskae (season 3)
- Darlene Mccarty as Nana (season 3–present)
- Aaron Trainor as Will Chaffin (season 3)
- Kathryn Brown as Hope Chaffin (season 3)
- DeRon Brigdon as Wesson (season 3)
- Michael Berryman as The Founder (season 4–present)
- Michael Oaks as Mr. Sunshine (season 4)
- Kodiak Lopez as JZ (season 4–present)

== Minor characters ==
- Scott Roddan as Donner

Donner is a member of Camp Blue Sky in New York, encountered in the debut episode. He and another guy were walking the perimeter when they came across a horrific sight. A lake filled to the brim with walkers, which they thought were completely dead. "Puppies and Kittens".

- Rick Rivera as Tobias Campbell

Tobias Campbell is the founder and leader of the Philadelphia cannibal survivor group, first encountered in the third episode of season 1, "Philly Feast". This group, based in the Upper Darby Township, Pennsylvania area, starts out like many others, surviving by way of Tobias's resourcefulness and cunning, while still retaining some semblance of their humanity and morality. However, after his wife becomes ill, Tobias suffers a mental breakdown and leads his "family" down the dark path of victimization and cannibalism.

- Yuji Okumoto as Bernt.

Bernt is a member of the Philadelphia cannibal survivor group, first encountered in the third episode of season 1, "Philly Feast". One of Tobias's men, he is responsible for guarding the gate.

- Bill Moseley as Arthur McCandles

General Arthur C. McCandles is the commander of the Emergency Headquarters for Infection Control in McLean, Virginia, appearing in the fourth episode of season 1, "Full Metal Zombie". McCandles, who has gone insane, is holed up in a secure building, surrounded by undead soldiers and the corpses of his military peers. He hurts his leg badly, contracting gangrene, and when told that the leg requires amputation, he murders his former medic by throwing him into an airshaft. When the Westward-bound survivor group reaches his stronghold in need of a helicopter, McCandles allows Doc in, believing him to be a real doctor, and throws him into the same airshaft when Doc gives him the same prognosis. McCandles dies by attacking a group of zombies, then throwing himself and the zombies off the building's rooftop.

- Jason Gallagher as Keith Richards

Keith Richards is part of the S&S Unlimited gun show in Kansas, encountered in the seventh episode of season 1, "Welcome to the Fu-Bar". He plays guitar in the Fu-Bar. He is last seen fleeing the area after the approach of the "zunami", and his status is unknown.

- Christy Choi as Brittany

Brittany, a girl traveling with her father, encounters the Westward-bound survivor group in Kansas at the S&S Unlimited gun show, in the seventh episode of season 1, "Welcome to the Fu-Bar". She participates in a shooting contest, losing to 10K as the zunami enters the area. 10K gives her the first prize, a rifle, which she uses to save him from a zombie. She then safely leaves with her father.

- Conner Marx as Cosmonaut Yuri

Yuri is an imaginary Russian pilot, a hallucination experienced by Citizen Z due to oxygen deprivation. He appears in the eighth episode of season 1, "Zunami".

- Kelly McGillis as Helen

Helen is the leader of the Sisters of Mercy camp, first encountered in the 11th episode of season 1, "Sisters of Mercy". She and her sister-wives started the camp, which only allow women and female children to stay, but she turns away male travelers and sets the boys off on a suicide mission once they are 13 years old. A survivor of abuse by her late husband, she promotes killing men even if there is no proof of any wrongdoing. Her main ability in the apocalypse is to brainwash every women and girl she can.

- William Sadler as Sam Custer

Sam Custer is a former long-haul driver who becomes the wagon master of a group of survivors headed to Edmonton. He appears in the third episode of season 2, "Zombie Road". Sam is suffering from radiation poisoning, but continues to drive a modified truck carrying the survivors until his apparent demise.

- George R. R. Martin as Zombie George R. R. Martin

A famous author (played by himself), he is bitten after escaping to his hotel room when the Comic Con event he is attending as a guest star is overrun. He appears in the eighth episode of season 2, "The Collector", as part of the zombie collection of Dean a.k.a. "The Collector", and is the only famous person that Dean has collected. He spends his zombie days signing books through retained muscle memory. Dean hopes to eventually make his fortune by selling the books on eBay when humankind makes its comeback.

- Tom Beyer as Dean

Dean, a.k.a. "The Collector", is the curator of a unique collection of mutated zombies, displaying them in a museum setting and restraining the zombies with an invisible dog fence. He appears in the eighth episode of season 2, "The Collector". In the past, Dean aspired to be part of the Centers for Disease Control and Prevention, repeatedly warning them about the possibility of a zombie pandemic. He grew bitter after repeated rejections and began his own preparations for what he saw as the inevitable zombie apocalypse. He captures Murphy, interviewing him, sampling his blood and controlling him with a shock collar. Dean is killed by bites from a nuclear zombie, a "phytozombie" and a "blaster" zombie, all released from captivity by Murphy.

- Missi Pyle as Bernadette

Bernadette is the leader of a cult-like group of "extranauts", people who believed they will soon be going to outer space with a race of aliens. She appears in the ninth episode of season 2, "Rozwell".

- Eddie Spears as Gorden Firecloud, a.k.a. Red Hawk

Gorden "Red Hawk" Firecloud is the leader of part of a Native American tribe that follows him to their ancestral land, in the hope that their ancestors will protect them. The son of Chief Dan Firecloud and brother of Ayalla Firecloud, he appears in the 10th episode of season 2, "We Were Nowhere Near the Grand Canyon". Before the apocalypse, he was a college professor specializing in native culture. His tribe is wary of the zombie virus infecting their community, calling it "Zendigo" and a "disease of the soul", and Red Hawk blames the outbreak on whites.

- Tinsel Korey as Ayalla Firecloud

Ayalla Firecloud is the sister of Red Hawk, but does not share his views. She appears in the 10th episode of season 2, "We Were Nowhere Near the Grand Canyon".

- Anthony Michael Hall as Gideon Gould

Gideon Gould appears in the 11th episode of season 2, "Corporate Retreat".

- John Wu as Lt. Mong

Lt. Mong is encountered in the second episode of season 3, "A New Mission". He is a soldier in what is left of the Chinese army, and is part of Dr Sun Mei's team. Mong is bitten by a zombie during the Chinese team's mission to obtain their supply drop. He is given mercy by Sun Mei.
