= Erica Oyama =

American screenwriter, producer and actress

- Born: March 28, 1981 (age 45); Birmingham, Alabama, US
- Occupations: Television writer, producer, actress
- Notable work: Burning Love (2012), Never Have I Ever (2020), The Ten (2007)
- Spouse: Ken Marino
- Children: 2
- Relatives: Zac Oyama (brother)

Erica Oyama (born 28 March 1981) is an American television writer and producer. She created and wrote the comedy series Burning Love.

Oyama was born to an American mother and Yasuhiko Ōyama, a renowned Japanese karate master trained by the founder of Kyokushin karate, in Birmingham, Alabama. She attended the Alabama School of Fine Arts. She is married to actor and comedian Ken Marino. She is sister to comedian Zac Oyama.
