= Never Have I Ever (TV series) =

American television series (2020–2023)

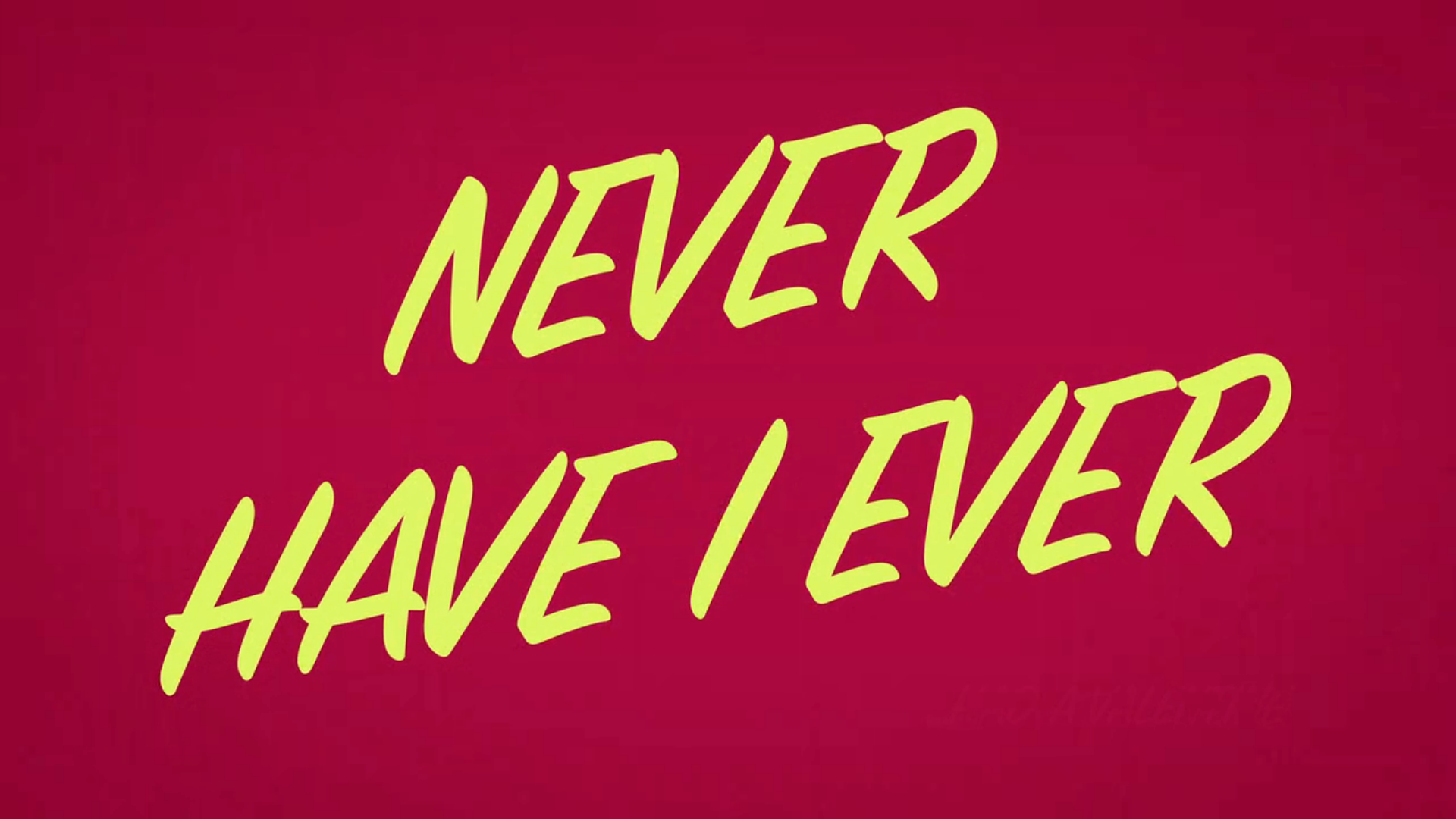
- Genre: Comedy drama; Coming-of-age; Teen drama
- Created by: Mindy Kaling; Lang Fisher
- Starring: Maitreyi Ramakrishnan; Poorna Jagannathan; Richa Moorjani; Jaren Lewison; Darren Barnet; Ramona Young; Lee Rodriguez; John McEnroe
- Narrated by: John McEnroe (36 episodes); Andy Samberg (2 episodes); Gigi Hadid (2 episodes)
- Composer: Joseph Stephens
- Country of origin: United States
- Original language: English
- No. of seasons: 4
- No. of episodes: 40

Production
- Executive producers: Mindy Kaling; Lang Fisher; Howard Klein; David Miner; Tristram Shapeero
- Production locations: Los Angeles, California
- Camera setup: Single-camera
- Running time: 22–31 minutes
- Production companies: Kaling International; Original Langster; 3 Arts Entertainment; Universal Television
- Budget: $2.5 million per episode

Original release
- Network: Netflix
- Release: April 27, 2020 – June 8, 2023

Never Have I Ever is an American comedy-drama television series created by Mindy Kaling and Lang Fisher. It premiered on Netflix on April 27, 2020 and stars Maitreyi Ramakrishnan, who plays an Indian-American high school student dealing with the sudden death of her father and the bumpy journey through her last three years of high school.

Though it takes place in the San Fernando Valley, the series has been reported to be loosely based on Kaling's childhood experiences in the Boston area, while Kaling herself has said it is based "in the spirit of my childhood".

The series has received critical acclaim and has been described as a watershed moment for Indian representation in Hollywood.

The series concluded on June 8, 2023, after 40 episodes spanning four seasons.

== Plot ==
=== Season 1 ===
The story centers around Devi Vishwakumar, a 15-year-old (at the start of the series) Indian-American Tamil girl from Sherman Oaks, Los Angeles. After her father, Mohan, dies suddenly at her orchestra performance, Devi enters paralysis due to psychological trauma, making her unable to walk for three months. One day, in an attempt to see her crush Paxton Hall-Yoshida doing tricks with her friends, she miraculously recovers and stands on her legs. After having a socially horrible first year, she wishes to change her social status, but friends, family, and feelings do not make it easy for her. Meanwhile, Devi's friend Eleanor deals with learning her absentee mother has been back in town for months with no contact, breaking her. Devi's other friend Fabiola struggles to come out as lesbian. Devi's live-in cousin Kamala tries to hide her college boyfriend from her family, as her family expects her to wed Prashant, a man she's met once, in an arranged marriage.

=== Season 2 ===
The following year, Devi tries to deal with her grief, her identity, and school life. At the same time, her relationship with her mother, Nalini, becomes strained. When Devi finds out she has to move to India, she and her mom get into a huge argument before they spread her dad’s ashes. She then temporarily moves into Ben Gross's house, before making up with her mom. While spreading Mohan’s ashes, Devi says sorry to her mom. Devi also has to deal with her feelings for Paxton and Ben, after she cheats on both of them with each other. She also finds out she isn’t moving to India any more, so she has to make up with Ben and Paxton. Adding to the mix is a new Indian-American in school, Aneesa Qureshi. Devi starts to feel jealous about her popularity/dating her ex, Ben, and starts a rumor about her anorexia, at the track race because there's a tent where Trent started to hook up, and Devi saw Ben and Aneesa in there and spreads the rumor. But after Devi finds out Aneesa and Ben are just friends, they make peace after numerous unsuccessful apologies and become close friends. Devi also finds her mother romantically involved with Dr. Jackson and is upset that she moved on so quickly from the death of her father, so Nalini ends things with Dr. Jackson for Devi. Paxton gets over Devi's betrayal and the two become romantically interested again after Devi tutors Paxton. Meanwhile, Kamala experiences sexism in her biology research lab. She grows close to Prashant before running away from their dinner because she was scared for marriage, to go to the school to visit Manish Kulkarni, Devi's English teacher. Kamala does try to apologize to Prashant, but they both realize their relationship is not going to work out.

Paxton doesn't refer to Devi as his girlfriend, and publicly refuses her when she asks him to the dance, which makes Devi think that he is using her. They later talk, and Paxton says that they cannot date publicly because Devi cheated on him. Devi agrees to privately date him, but she later changes her mind and breaks up with him because that is what her dad would have wanted her to do. Paxton realizes his mistake and goes to the dance with Devi, apologizing to her. The two begin to date publicly, but Devi starts to feel insecure due to others gossiping about them. When Paxton has a friendly reconciliation with a girl he wronged in the past, Devi's insecurity turns to jealousy, causing Paxton to break up with her, leaving her standing there in tears.

=== Season 3 ===
In the beginning of junior year, Devi finds out that Paxton has a new girlfriend, and Paxton thinks that Devi is really sad about him moving on so quickly. Devi later goes to a birthday party and her mom tells her to take her friend's son, Des, there because he has no friends. Devi is expecting Des will be a complete dork at the party, but is actually surprised as they get along and start dating without their mothers knowing. They eventually get caught, with Rhyah catching them. Paxton realizes that Devi has moved on and they are both in good relationships. Soon, Des’s mom, Ryah, finds out about Devi and Des dating and Nalini approves of them being together. Fabiola and Aneesa also start dating after Fabiola stood up for Aneesa and proved that she deserved someone better than Ben. Devi is really excited for her new relationship with Des, but Des’s mom tells Des to break up with Devi because she “has too many problems”. Devi finds out about this and confronts Des and throws iced coffee in his face. Nalini stands up to Ryah and tells her that Devi does not have problems. Nalini helps Devi with her breakup. Paxton decides to break up with Phoebe, as he wanted something more. While Fabiola and Aneesa break up when they realize things are too awkward for them.

=== Season 4 ===
In the summer before senior year, Devi loses her virginity to Ben, but it ends awkwardly and Ben ghosts her soon after. Devi grows frustrated, which is amplified when her senior year begins, and she finds out Ben has a new girlfriend named Margot. The two girls get in an argument, which results in Devi yelling profanity that results in a teacher fainting & a visit to the principal's office visit for her and Margot. Margot gives her a series of back-handed apologies, but with the help of Devi's therapist, Devi tries to make up with Margot. This attempt fails and Margot only ends up more enraged with Devi, though later in the season, they eventually make peace as Margot's father Andres, dates Nalini. Devi begins a sexual relationship with "bad boy" Ethan Morales, only to have to break up with him after he steals the Princeton rep's Wallet. Devi's dream of getting into Princeton is complicated when Fabiola's mother forces her to apply for Princeton and she gets in ahead of Devi. Encouraged by her counselor and Ben, Devi works hard to get off the waitlist and finally gets accepted at Princeton. Given the proximity between her and Ben, with the latter accepting a scholarship to NYU, the two decide to date during university life after confessing their feelings to each other the previous night at Nirmalas wedding. Pati, Devi's paternal grandma, marries her boyfriend Len, whom she dated for a brief time after overcoming her orthodox and conservative thoughts about aged widows being interested in love after their husbands' deaths which Nalini, Kamala and Devi are extremely enthusiastic about. Kamala is shown to be a little skeptical about Len, believing that he is attempting to scam Pati, but is proven wrong later. Paxton starts dating Ms. Lindsay Thompson, a fellow replacement faculty member at Sherman Oaks High. Fabiola is shown to be enjoying robotics at Howard University, as she previously decided that despite her acceptance at Princeton it was not right for her, as she didn't feel a spark. Eleanor is trying to make her way into directing films while happily dating Trent. Nalini has moved on by dating Margot's father, Mr. Ramos, after the two are set up by Devi and Ben's ex Margot. Kamala moves to Baltimore after her promotion under Dr. Logan and is shown to be with Manish there. On this note, the show comes to an end with every character being at their rightful happy place.

The majority of Never Have I Ever is narrated by professional tennis player John McEnroe, particularly in scenes and episodes revolving around the main character Devi, with the latter often showing flashes of McEnroe's legendary temper juxtaposed with references to McEnroe's past tennis matches. Two of the episodes are narrated by Andy Samberg for Ben, and another two by Gigi Hadid for Paxton. The narrators, often breaking the fourth wall, give insight into the thoughts of each character and his/her personal struggles.

== Cast and characters ==
=== Main ===
- Maitreyi Ramakrishnan as Devi Vishwakumar, initially a 15-year-old high school sophomore who wants to improve her life and harbors feelings for both Paxton Hall-Yoshida and Ben Gross. She is based on the show's creator, Mindy Kaling. She is known for her emotional and erratic behavior at times and sees a therapist to help deal with the loss of her father, who died prior to the events of the series. She is a star student and has dreamed of going to Princeton University since an early age.
- Poorna Jagannathan as Dr. Nalini Vishwakumar, a successful dermatologist who owns her own practice and mother of Devi, with whom she has a mixed relationship: she cares strongly for her daughter but believes in tough love and strict parenting, causing friction between the two at times. Over time, their relationship evolves and becomes a beautiful one at the end.
- Richa Moorjani as Kamala Nandiwadal, Devi's cousin who is staying with Devi's family while completing her PhD at Caltech. Although she is better behaved and more devoted to her culture than Devi, she struggles with expectations put on her to marry an arranged suitor and develop her career.
- Ranjit Chakravarty as Nirmala (Pati) Devi's grandma as she moves in with them at the beginning of Season 2 after Nalini convincing her to stay to help her parenting but also for her to feel closer to Mohan as that is where he once lived. She also wanted more family around her. [1, 2]
- Jaren Lewison as Benjamin "Ben" Gross, also a high school sophomore. Initially Devi's nemesis at school as the two frequently compete for academic accolades, he becomes a good friend for whom she has complicated feelings. The two become more supportive of each other and eventually date.
- Darren Barnet as Paxton Hall-Yoshida, a popular, athletic 16-year-old high school junior and Devi's crush, later love interest. He used to be the captain of the high school swim team, but was forced to give up swimming after suffering a car accident. After graduating, he attends Arizona State University, but later becomes an assistant swim coach at the high school upon deciding university is not for him. However, he realizes the needs of life and moves back to ASU at the end of Season 4.
- Ramona Young as Eleanor Wong, one of Devi's best friends who has a passion for acting and struggles with the fact her mother is absent after abandoning her for acting when Eleanor was 7.
- Lee Rodriguez as Fabiola Torres, one of Devi's best friends who is on the robotics team and struggles with her sexuality, later coming out as lesbian.
- John McEnroe as himself, the narrator of the series and Mohan's idol. In the season 1 finale, he makes a brief on-screen cameo.

=== Recurring ===
- Sendhil Ramamurthy as Mohan Vishwakumar, Devi's deceased father, who appears in flashbacks and visions
- Niecy Nash as Dr. Jamie Ryan, Devi's therapist, who helps her through her trauma.
- Eddie Liu as Steve (season 1), Kamala's secret boyfriend who she later beaks up with.
- Christina Kartchner as Eve Hjelm (seasons 1–2; guest season 3), Fabiola's love interest who later moves away to Korea, forcing Fabiola to break up with her.
- Alexandra Billings as Jennifer Warner (seasons 2, 4), the school's college counselor.
- Benjamin Norris as Trent Harrison, core member of the Hot Pocket, Paxton's best friend, and later Eleanor's boyfriend.
- Dino Petrera as Jonah Sharpe (seasons 1–3), a boy who comes out as gay and helps Fabiola with her sexuality.
- Tembi Locke as Elise Torres (season 1, guest seasons 2, 4), Fabiola's mother.
- Jae Suh Park as Joyce Wong (season 1; guest season 4), Eleanor's absent mother who is a bumbling actress prioritizing her non-existent career over her daughter.
- Adam Shapiro as Mr. Lyle Shapiro, a history teacher who tries to relate with his students and be the 'cool' teacher.
- Cocoa Brown as Principal Grubbs who is often tired with Devi and Ben's rivalry.
- Martin Martinez as Oliver Martinez (season 1–2), Eleanor's boyfriend and later ex-boyfriend after she kisses Malcome Stone.
- Jack Seavor McDonald as Eric Perkins, an unpopular student and member of the robotics team who later trains for the swim team with Paxton in Season 4, proving his worth.
- Lily D. Moore as Rebecca Hall-Yoshida (seasons 1–3), Paxton's sister who is interested in fashion design, Paxton is very protective of her as she has down-syndrome and is targeted by bullies. She and Devi develop a friendship.
- Hanna Stein as Shira Liedman (seasons 1–3), a popular, shallow student and Ben's girlfriend in season 1 using him for his money.
- Angela Kinsey as Vivian Gross (season 1), Ben's mother who is barely around, prioritizing retreats and herself over her son
- Michael Badalucco as Howard Gross (seasons 1, 3), Ben's father who is a big-time entertainment lawyer who like his mother is also an absent parent
- Donna Pieroni as Patty (seasons 1, 3), Ben's housekeeper who is more of a parent to Ben than his own
- Dana G. Vaughns as Marcus Jones, Paxton's friend (seasons 1–3)
- Aitana Rinab as Zoe Maytag, Shira's friend (seasons 1–3)
- Megan Suri as Aneesa Qureshi (seasons 2–4), a new Indian student at Sherman Oaks and Devi's new acquaintance and Ben's girlfriend for a brief period. While Devi and her family are Hindu, Aneesa is a Muslim
- Rushi Kota as Prashant (season 1–2), an engineer Kamala is set up with by their families. Prashant and Kamala like each other and date briefly until Kamala realises she is not ready to settle down just yet
- Tyler Alvarez as Malcolm Stone (season 2), a former Disney actor and an elementary school friend who transfers to Sherman Oaks briefly dating Eleanor
- Utkarsh Ambudkar as Mr. Manish Kulkarni (seasons 2–4), an English teacher who is friends with Devi and also coaches the girls' soccer team, later dating Kamala and moving with her when she gets a job offer in season 4.
- P. J. Byrne as Evan Safstrom (season 2), a head research assistant at Caltech
- John Mawson as Dr. Elgin Peters (season 2), a Nobel prize-winning scientist at Caltech
- Common as Dr. Chris Jackson (season 2), a dermatologist who works with Nalini and develops an interest in Nalini
- Tohoru Masamune as Kevin Hall-Yoshida (seasons 2–3), Paxton's father
- Kelly Sullivan as June Hall-Yoshida (seasons 2–4), Paxton's mother
- Ranjita Chakravarty as Nirmala Vishwakumar, Mohan's mother (seasons 2–4), Nalini's mother-in-law and Devi's paternal grandmother who moves in with them in season 2
- Clyde Kusatsu as Ted Yoshida (season 2), Paxton's paternal grandfather
- Helen Hong as Sharon Wong (season 2), Eleanor's stepmother
- Sarayu Blue as Rhyah (season 3), Nalini's new Indian friend and mother to Des
- Victoria Moroles as Margot Ramos (seasons 3–4), an artistic student at Sherman Oaks High School who dates Ben and has a rivalry with Devi
- Anirudh Pisharody as Nirdesh "Des" (season 3), an Indian student who goes to an elite private school; Rhyah's son and briefly Devi's boyfriend
- Michael Cimino as Ethan Morales (season 4), a rebellious high-school senior whom Devi briefly dates
- Jeff Garlin as Len (season 4), a man who begins a relationship with Nirmala and later marries her in the season 4 finale
- Ivan Hernandez as Andres Ramos (season 4), Margot's single father who works as a contractor in Nalini's home and becomes her love interest
- Genneya Walton as Lindsay Thompson (season 4), a new AP Literature substitute teacher at Sherman Oaks High School who later dates Paxton

=== Guest ===
- Aarti Mann as Jaya Kuyavar (season 1)
- Markus Jorgensen as Boris Koslov (season 1), a Russian exchange student
- Gilberto Ortiz as Alex Gomez (season 1), a young man interested in Fabiola
- Chelly as Parvesh (season 1), a Vishwakumar family friend
- Peter James Smith as Mr. Chan (seasons 1, 3), the orchestra teacher
- Kikéy Castillo as Christina Harrison (season 1), Trent's mother
- Atticus Shaffer as a young man who participates in model UN as Russia (season 1)
- Iqbal Theba as Aravind (season 1), Mohan's brother and Devi's Paternal Uncle who visits to be the male chaperone when Kamala meets Prashant
- Mark Collier as Andy (season 1), the Vishwakumars' neighbor
- Adriyah Marie Young as Carley (seasons 1–3), Shira's friend
- Andy Samberg as himself (seasons 1–3), the narrator for Ben Gross' thoughts in two episodes (plus a short cameo in a season 2 episode)
- Pragathi Guruprasad as Preethi's sister (season 1)
- Anjul Nigam as Raj (season 1), a pandit at the Ganesh Puja celebration
- Gigi Hadid as herself (seasons 2, 4), the narrator for Paxton Hall-Yoshida's thoughts in two episodes
- Pooja Kumar as Noor (season 2), Aneesa's mother
- Andrew Tinpo Lee as Paul Wong (season 2), Eleanor's father
- Sunit Gupta as Karthik (season 2), Nalini's father, and Devi's maternal grandfather
- K.T. Thangavelu as Charu (season 2), Nalini's mother, and Devi's maternal grandmother
- Alex Felix as Haley Garcia (season 3), a girl who was wronged by Paxton and trolled Devi via direct messages
- Alli Albrecht as Phoebe Hayward (season 3), the captain of the gymnastics team, whom Paxton briefly dates
- Deacon Philippe as Parker (season 3), one of Des' close friends
- Terry Hu as Addison (seasons 3–4), a non-binary friend of Des and Fabiola's current partner
- Dwight Howard as himself (season 4)
- Janina Gavankar as Akshara (season 4), a representative for Princeton University
- Pete Gardner as Coach Noble (season 4), the swimming team coach; he was also mentioned to be the gym teacher in season 2
- Claudia O'Doherty as Baby (season 4), Len's Australian real-estate agent
- Jade Bender as Blair Quan (season 4), a former alumna of Sherman Oaks who was idolized by Devi and is supposed to give Devi a personal tour of Princeton.
- Ken Marino as Stoo (season 4), the limo driver

== Episodes ==
Season	Episodes	Originally released
1	10	April 27, 2020
2	10	July 15, 2021
3	10	August 12, 2022
4	10	June 8, 2023

=== Season 1 (2020) ===
No. overall	No. in season	Title	Directed by	Written by	Original release date
1	1	"Pilot"	Tristram Shapeero	Mindy Kaling & Lang Fisher	April 27, 2020
After her father's death and using a wheelchair for her first year, Devi becomes determined to have an exciting second year. Devi also attends therapy to cope and deal with her feelings. She pleads with best friends, Eleanor and Fabiola, to get boyfriends too so that the group becomes cool, doing many things such as dressing revealingly to impress her target. However, when she discovers that Eleanor has a boyfriend, she has a breakdown, throws her math textbook out the window, and asks classmate Paxton, on whom she has a crush, if he would like to have sex with her, which he surprisingly accepts. Devi's cousin Kamala is told that her marriage is being arranged.
2	2	"... had sex with Paxton Hall-Yoshida"	Tristram Shapeero	Justin Noble	April 27, 2020
Devi refuses to talk about her father to her therapist, Dr. Ryan. While Eleanor and Fabiola think Devi is crazy when she mentions her plans to have sex with Paxton, Nalini decides to sell Mohan's motorcycle because she thinks it clutters the garage and the memory is painful. Meanwhile, Kamala feels conflicted about her arranged marriage and is coached by Nalini on what to say to her future in-laws. Devi leaves orchestra practice early to go to Paxton's house after triggering memories of the concert at which her father died; however, she leaves when she does not feel ready to have sex. Kamala meets with her secret boyfriend, Steve, and reluctantly breaks up with him due to her arranged marriage. After gaining newfound confidence, Devi returns to Paxton's house to have sex but runs into his sister, Rebecca, and begins conversing. This irritates Paxton and he asks Devi to leave.
3	3	"... gotten drunk with the popular kids"	Linda Mendoza	Amina Munir	April 27, 2020
Paxton apologizes to Devi, saying he's overprotective of his sister, then decides things are now too weird to have sex with her. In her father's old garden, Devi sees a coyote who picks her father's tennis ball up, leading her to believe that it is her father's reincarnation. In Facing History, Devi is delighted when Paxton asks her to join his group but learns that he did it to achieve good grades. Eleanor and Fabiola team up with Ben and Eve, the latter of whom Fabiola has a crush on. Fabiola breaks up with her boyfriend and realizes she is a lesbian. She tries to talk to Eve, but fails out of fright. Devi attends a party where she sees Paxton flirting with Zoe and gets drunk in response. Intoxicated, Devi sees a coyote outside and talks to it, believing it is her father but is attacked and scratched badly on her arm. Paxton takes her to the hospital. Later, he affirms their relationship's platonic nature and starts following her on social media. When Nalini discovers that Devi got drunk, she gets angry at her and Paxton for their irresponsibility and grounds Devi from leaving the house. Inspired by a Riverdale scene, Kamala reconciles with Steve.
4	4	"... felt super Indian"	Linda Mendoza	Mindy Kaling	April 27, 2020
At a Ganesh Puja celebration held at the high school, Devi's mother Nalini asks Devi to smooth-talk Ron, a college admissions advisor. Nalini also dreads talking with other Indian aunties because they take fake pity on her and endlessly brag. Devi talks to a friend, Harish, now at Stanford, and he tells her that she should embrace her Indian roots, not mock them like they both did before. Ron asks Devi to use her father's death and her temporary paralysis as a story to get into college to stand out, but she refuses. While at the festival, Kamala meets Jaya Kuyavar who is ostracized due to refusing her arranged marriage and instead marrying a Muslim-American man whom she later divorced. She encourages Kamala to go ahead with her marriage to avoid being shunned as well. Later, Paxton compliments Devi on her outfit, further proving they are friends now.
5	5	"... started a nuclear war"	Kabir Akhtar	Chris Schleicher & Akshara Sekar	April 27, 2020
Fabiola gathers her family members to come out, but changes her mind, not feeling ready. Eleanor tells the group that her mother got a job on a cruise as an actress but Paxton says that her mother, Joyce, served them in a restaurant. Fabiola accompanies her there, where they see Joyce. Shocked and hurt, Eleanor runs out. Afterward, Fabiola comes out to Eleanor, who supports her. Devi joins Model UN to escape Nalini's punishment and fuels the lie that she and Paxton are sleeping together; another girl on the bus overhears her and spreads the rumor. She and nemesis Ben join forces to get the members alcohol. The next day, Devi turns against him in UN for accidentally spreading the rumor to the other members, and gets them to stand alongside her. Paxton gets mad when he hears the rumor and stops interacting with Devi.
6	6	"... been the loneliest boy in the world"	Kabir Akhtar	Aaron Geary & Ben Steiner	April 27, 2020
Ben returns home from Model UN to his mother leaving for a self-realization resort. Initially planning to see a game court-side with his girlfriend Shira and father, both cancel on him, so Ben gives the tickets to his housekeeper for her sons. Feeling lonely, he meets with a friend from Reddit who has bonded with him about old Rick and Morty cartoons, but the person turns out to be a 50-year-old man. Ben sees Nalini about a pimple that has been growing, and after having a small breakdown from his loneliness, she invites him to dinner with her family. Initially upset with Ben coming over, Devi is pleasantly surprised when he does not expose her behavior at Model UN. Voiceover by Andy Samberg.
7	7	"... been a big, fat liar"	Anu Valia	Erica Oyama	April 27, 2020
Devi tries to reconcile with Eleanor and Fabiola, who now spend time with Jonah, another student struggling to come out. She visits Joyce at work and encourages her to talk to Eleanor. When Joyce does, the three reconcile but Devi feels that Eleanor and Fabiola are replacing her with Jonah. She holds a sleepover to bond and everything seems to be going okay. Fabiola comes out to her mother, who embraces her. Joyce comes to the school and watches Eleanor rehearse, but leaves midway through to return to Broadway after realizing acting is her true passion. Distraught, Eleanor drops her colorful personality and quits the school play, and acting all together. Fabiola asks Devi to support Eleanor, but she goes to Paxton's house instead when he texts her to model for Rebecca.
8	8	"... pissed off everyone I know"	Anu Valia	Chris Schleicher	April 27, 2020
Eleanor and Fabiola decide to take a break from Devi, so she goes to see her therapist who tells her that all the drama that stems from grief over her father is impacting her social life. Devi consequently decides that she wants a new therapist after thinking Dr. Ryan isn't helping her. Ben throws a party for his birthday, but Devi is still grounded. She stays home, studying, but then walks in on Kamala with Steve. She blackmails Kamala into sneaking her to the party. A slightly drunk Ben and Devi converse, but he tries to kiss her, repulsing Devi. Upon learning that a classmate spiked the punch, Devi sees Fabiola about to drink it and attempts to warn her, but accidentally spills it over her. Fabiola argues with her in front of the crowd and accidentally comes out. Eve, who overheard, arranges a date with her. After Devi falls into the pool trying to cool down from the argument, Paxton drives her home and kisses her. When Devi gets home, she hallucinates about her father.
9	9	"... had to be on my best behavior"	Tristram Shapeero	Matt Warburton	April 27, 2020
Kamala's potential husband meets with the family over lunch for the first time. Devi enters Kamala's room to place a present only to find that Steve is present, waiting to rescue Kamala from her arranged marriage. At Devi's behest, Kamala talks with Steve to sort things out. Nalini walks in on them and reveals that she knew about the two as a couple. Paxton arrives to return Devi's dress from the party and accidentally reveals that Devi secretly attended Ben's party and that she and Paxton kissed. Nalini, enraged, yells at Paxton for "ruining" Devi's life. Devi's uncle reveals that Nalini is planning on moving them both to India. Devi gets in a fight with Nalini and refuses to move.
10	10	"... said I'm sorry"	Tristram Shapeero	Lang Fisher	April 27, 2020
Paxton avoids Devi following the incident with Nalini. Devi moves in with Ben so that she cannot be moved to India. Nalini visits her on Mohan's birthday and asks her to spread her father's ashes with her, but she refuses, thinking it is a ploy to move her. Ben, concerned at her actions, urges Fabiola and Eleanor to help Devi and they reconcile their friendship. Devi is encouraged to go to Malibu, but she has no means of transportation, so Ben drives her. At the beach, Devi encounters John McEnroe who helps her find her family. Devi, Nalini, and Kamala spread Mohan's ashes and she agrees to move back in with them. Afterward, Devi finds Ben still waiting in his car to make sure she is okay; touched by his kindness, she kisses Ben and he reciprocates. Meanwhile, Paxton, at Rebecca's urging to reconcile with Devi, leaves her a message while waiting at her front door as Devi returns.

=== Season 2 (2021) ===
No. overall	No. in season	Title	Directed by	Written by	Original release date
11	1	"... been a playa"	Kabir Akhtar	Mindy Kaling	July 15, 2021
Devi and Ben are interrupted by Nalini who berates her for making out with him. After returning home, Devi finds Paxton waiting outside her house and they agree to have a date at his house, leaving Devi indecisive about whether to date him or Ben. At Eleanor and Fabiola's behest, she decides to break up with Ben but fails to do so and ends up dating him. However, she decides not to date Paxton after an awry first date. Despite this, she gets back together with him, meaning Devi is dating Ben and Paxton at the same time. Kamala is enthusiastic about working under Dr. Elgin Peters, a prominent cytologist but gets frustrated after having to deal with his sexist assistant, Evan. Whilst planning to move back to India, Nalini tries to sell her patient roster to Dr. Chris Jackson, a prominent but arrogant dermatologist who coldly rebuffs her.
12	2	"... thrown a rager"	Kabir Akhtar	Akshara Sekar	July 15, 2021
Devi decides to date two boys is fine because she is leaving for India in a month. She plans to throw a small, intimate party and invites only Paxton at first because of his fake ID, so he can bring alcohol. Eleanor accidentally invites Ben too, so Devi decides to now invite almost everyone in their school, in the hopes that the crowd will prevent her two boyfriends from running into each other. Eventually, Ben discovers that Devi is dating both of them and tells Paxton. Paxton angrily leaves. When Devi follows him into the street, a distracted Paxton is hit by a car. Nalini has an eye-opening trip to India where learns she will not be supported by her parents if she makes the move, which was her primary reason for wanting to return. After talking it over with her mother-in-law, Nalini decides against moving to India, meaning Devi has to face both Paxton and Ben at school.
13	3	"... opened a textbook"	Kim Nguyen	Erica Oyama	July 15, 2021
After the chaotic party, both Paxton and Ben avoid Devi. Paxton now has a broken arm from the car accident, preventing him from being able to swim, which effectively ends his chances of getting into college with a swimming scholarship. Paxton soon learns he must bring up his grades substantially to get into college at all. For revenge, he makes Devi do all of his homework, blaming her for his broken arm. Paxton's sister and a visit to his grandfather convince him to stop acting coldly towards Devi, leading to him reconciling with her. Devi then tutors him, and Paxton gets a "B" on an exam soon after. Voiceover by Gigi Hadid, with a cameo by Andy Samberg.
14	4	"... had an Indian frenemy"	Lena Khan	Amina Munir	July 15, 2021
Devi finds herself resenting the new Indian girl at school, Aneesa, but later, they have a sleepover, and Devi and Aneesa get acquainted. They sneak out in the night where they meet up with a few boys including Ben and Malcolm, Eleanor's crush. Devi gets a nose ring on a dare by Ben, who gets a tattoo, only later revealing that it isn't real, in revenge. The next morning when Nalini discovers Devi's nose ring, Aneesa covers for her. Kamala struggles to be respected and treated as an equal at her research lab.
15	5	"... ruined someone's life"	Maggie Carey	Aaron Geary & Ben Steiner	July 15, 2021
During a 24-hour relay, to boost her PE grade back to an A, Devi realizes Ben and Aneesa will be together the entire time. Paranoid, she constantly tries to separate them by forcing the other to run the relay lap. After she sees them going into Trent's tent assuming they will have sex, Devi complains to some of the popular girls that she thinks Aneesa could be anorexic. Later, she sees a distraught Aneesa and finds out that she indeed does have anorexia, and that she transferred to Sherman Oaks High School because of being humiliated for it. Devi leaves the relay feeling guilty about her actions. Fabiola finds out that her mother and Eve will be at the same relay so she tries to distance them from each other, fearing that her mother will be weird to Eve. However, after Fabiola introduces them to each other, her mother and Eve actually get along. Relating that Fabiola's father and herself were Cricket King & Queen at the school's winter dance, Fabiola's mother suggests that Eve and Fabiola run for Cricket Queen & Queen.
16	6	"... betrayed a friend"	Lena Khan & Anu Valia	Marina Cockenberg & Vance Stringer	July 15, 2021
Aneesa reports the rumor to the principal, after which she and Devi are enlisted to investigate who spread the rumor. Devi frames Zoe and Shira for spreading the rumor but later confesses out of guilt and consequently gets suspended from school for one week. The fake search caused Devi to miss a lunchtime appointment to tutor Paxton, leading to Paxton angrily blaming Devi when he fails his test. Enraged over being suspended, Devi tells him that he just needs to be a better student. After Evan tells Kamala and the research team that they will be published in an upcoming article, Kamala later sees that the draft of the article credits everyone except for her, even though she made the key discovery that is the basis for the article. She uses a mentorship meeting with Evan's superior to complain, but the professor seems indifferent. At a retirement party for her mentor, Dr. Morales, Nalini bonds with Chris. Fabiola and Eve register to run for Cricket Queen & Queen.
17	7	"... begged for forgiveness"	Lena Khan	Dave King	July 15, 2021
During her suspension, Nalini grounds Devi and forces her to help Nirmala with her chores. Ben later visits Devi's house and tells her that Aneesa will transfer to another school. He implores Devi to apologize to Aneesa to prevent her from leaving. Unsure of how to apologize, Devi enlists Eleanor and Fabiola to help her, but the over-the-top apology causes Aneesa to reject it, and does not change her mind about leaving. Devi eventually returns to school a second time and delivers a more sincere apology to Aneesa, but finds out that Aneesa's mother insists on transferring her. After Devi begs Nalini to speak with Aneesa's mother, they convince her to keep Aneesa at school. Meanwhile, Prashant suggests that Kamala get over being snubbed on her team's research article, saying that making waves could hurt her more. Later, using advice she received from Devi and Setseg, a fellow scientist, Kamala puts her name on the article and stands up to Evan. Elsewhere, after praising Chris for his parenting advice, Nalini shares a kiss with him.
18	8	"... been Daisy Buchanan"	Claire Scanlon	Asmita Paranjape & Christina Hjelm	July 15, 2021
After Manish has his class prepare for a mock trial on whether or not Daisy Buchanan was responsible for the murder of Jay Gatsby, Devi teams up with Ben and Aneesa to take the side of proving Daisy's innocence. However, Ben and Aneesa's constant flirting tests Devi's vow to handle her emotions maturely. After seeking advice from Manish, Devi manages to bear Ben and Aneesa flirting. During the trial, Aneesa messes up due to not being prepared, causing her team to lose. Ben gets angry, as he's not used to losing academic competitions. Meanwhile, Fabiola sees texts that suggest Malcolm is cheating on Eleanor, and shares this with Devi. The two stage an intervention for Eleanor. However, Eleanor gets back with Malcolm after Malcolm makes an excuse, and she scorns her friends. Later, after taking a car ride from Paxton, Devi finds her mother making out with Chris in his car.
19	9	"... stalked my own mother"	Claire Scanlon	Chris Schleicher	July 15, 2021
Devi unsuccessfully prods Nalini, attempting to learn about her relationship with Chris. That night, Devi takes Kamala to his house to spy on Nalini and Chris but gets caught. Nirmala later slaps Devi and tells her that it is her mother's decision but later helps the two reconcile. Afterwards, Devi comes to terms with her feelings and Dr. Ryan diagnoses Devi with psychosomatic weakness. Meanwhile, Malcolm breaks up with Eleanor, who consequently vows to spend time with people who care about her and bonds with Sharon and her father, later reconciling with Devi and Fabiola per Sharon's advice. Paxton, taking Devi's advice about not relying on her for good grades, brings his grandfather to explain his experiences in Japanese internment camps, for his extra credit assignment in Facing History. That night, he sneaks into Devi's room to make out with her, only to call her "pal" in the school hallways the next day. Nalini visits Chris and says it's probably best that they don't pursue a relationship right now. Fabiola returns to the robotics team after missing several meetings to attend events with Eve, and Eric informs her she is no longer team captain.
20	10	"... been a perfect girl"	Lang Fisher	Lang Fisher	July 15, 2021
Devi asks Paxton to the winter dance but gets rejected. When she has an emotional breakdown, Ben, who saw Paxton's rejection, consoles Devi. With his, Fabiola's, and Eleanor's encouragement, Devi breaks up with Paxton. At the winter dance, Eve asks where Fabiola is. Devi and Eleanor find her having an emotional meltdown. Devi, Eleanor, and Jonah convince Fabiola that she can embrace her lesbian identity without assimilating to others' standards. Soon after, Eve and Fabiola are crowned as the school's first Cricket Queen & Queen. As they dance, Fabiola tells Eve she loves her, which Eve reciprocates. After Trent asks Eleanor to dance, a lonely Devi decides to leave, but Paxton appears and tells Devi he's there as her boyfriend. They reconcile and dance in front of an astonished crowd. Ben becomes dejected seeing this, after which Eleanor apologizes for pressuring Devi into choosing Paxton. Anticipating Prashant's proposal, which she isn't ready for, Kamala flees dinner with her family and future in-laws to sing karaoke with Manish.

=== Season 3 (2022) ===
No. overall	No. in season	Title	Directed by	Written by	Original release date
21	1	"...been slut-shamed"	Maggie Carey	Mindy Kaling	August 12, 2022
Devi and Paxton have now become an official couple much to the school's shock. However, after being slut-shamed in the girls' bathroom and given advice by Dr. Ryan, Devi realizes that being in a relationship will not solve all her problems. After a confrontation with Zoe, she realizes that Paxton might not stay in a relationship with her if she doesn't have sex with him. After a conversation with Kamala, she realizes she is not ready to lose her virginity and Paxton supports her as well. After Kamala's departure from Prashant's engagement dinner, the latter decides it is best for them to break up, much to Devi's grandmother's dismay. Fabiola realizes that a long-distance relationship with Eve is taking a toll on her grades, and decides to break up with her.
22	2	"...had my own troll"	Maggie Carey	Marina Cockenberg	August 12, 2022
Devi discovers that she has a troll who warns her about Paxton's intentions. After research, she realizes her troll is Haley, one of Paxton's exes who's in the orchestra club with Devi. Devi convinces Paxton to make peace with the girls he was involved with in the past, including Haley. Aneesa, realizing that Ben may have underlying feelings for Devi, impulsively kisses Fabiola after a game of soccer. Nirmala hosts a party to find a new fiancé for Kamala. During the party, Nalini makes acquaintances with a nutritionist named Rhyah while Kamala decides to date Manish, to Nirmala's disappointment.
23	3	"...had a valentine"	Smriti Mundhra	Asmita Paranjape	August 12, 2022
On Valentine's Day, a compatibility test reveals that Devi is compatible with Eric while Paxton is compatible with Haley, engendering Devi's jealousy towards Haley. Later, Devi and Eleanor have dates with Paxton and Trent respectively for Valentine's Day, but their perception of their boyfriends is damaged. Due to her growing paranoia about the compatibility test, Paxton breaks up with Devi, saying he can't date a girl that doesn't love herself. Eleanor and Trent repair their relationship after revealing their insecurities to each other. Aneesa breaks up with Ben after deeming him to be too condescending and suspecting he's still hung up on Devi. She then apologizes to Fabiola for kissing her. Kamala struggles to gain Nirmala's acceptance of her relationship with Manish. Nalini and Rhyah become friends after spending time together after Valentine's Day.
24	4	"...made someone jealous"	Smriti Mundhra	Akshara Sekar	August 12, 2022
Seven months after breaking up with Devi, Paxton has a new girlfriend named Phoebe, which upsets Devi because she does not have a new boyfriend. Trent asks Eleanor and Paxton to throw a birthday party for him and invite the entire school, but Devi declines an invite because of her family's Navaratri celebration. Kamala secretly invites Manish to the household's holiday festivities, much to Nirmala's annoyance. After Nalini learns from Rhyah that her son, Nirdesh ("Des"), does not have any friends, she asks Devi to accompany him to Trent's party. Devi expects him to be a nerd, but finds herself attracted to him after they meet. Devi and Des dance, catching Paxton's eye. At the party, Fabiola scolds Ben for being so condescending about his intelligence. She challenges him to a knowledge drinking game, where she is able to beat him.
25	5	"...been ghosted"	Kabir Akhtar	Gabe Liedman	August 12, 2022
Several weeks after Trent's party, Des ghosts Devi. Believing that her flirting skills are rusty, Devi attends a charity event hosted by the school's drama club, hoping to improve. At the event, she eventually kisses a student named Alejandro who wows everyone with his guitar playing. While volunteering at the event, Fabiola receives relationship advice from Paxton. Having learned that Nirmala will never respect her choice to date whom she wants, Kamala moves into her own apartment. It turns out to be a building primarily made up of child actors and their parents, but she decides to stay after learning that she cannot get her deposit back, and after receiving encouragement from Nalini to stay. After the charity event, Aneesa asks Fabiola out on a date.
26	6	"...had a breakdown"	Kabir Akhtar	Amina Munir	August 12, 2022
Hoping to attend Columbia University to impress his father, Ben ignores advice from Patty and Principal Grubbs about not working too hard. However, after Ben experiences abdominal pain, Paxton takes him to a hospital where Ben receives an emergency surgery for fecal impaction. During his hospitalization, Ben helps Paxton on his college essay about how he looks after his adopted sister. The quality of the essay impresses Principal Grubbs. After the experience, Ben takes the advice given and decides not to overwork while improving his relationship with his father, who tells him that he is proud of him. Ben even decides not to stress over Devi, giving her good advice about approaching Des for a date. Des ultimately tells Devi he didn't text her because he could see she was interested in Paxton. Devi assures him she and Paxton are over, and the two agree to a date. Voiceover by Andy Samberg.
27	7	"...cheated"	Kim Nguyen	Aaron Geary & Ben Steiner	August 12, 2022
Nirmala tells Kamala that she disapproves of Kamala's relationship because she fears Manish's potential irresponsibility. Desperate for her team to win a debate against Des's elite private school, Devi disposes of Des's binder during a fire drill. Having seen Devi acting suspicious, Manish makes her team switch from the pro side to the con side. Devi ends up helping Sherman Oaks win the competition anyway. However, Manish still scolds her for cheating. He decides not to tell Principal Grubbs and instead bring the matter to Devi's family, an act that gains him Nirmala's admiration. Using Trent's and Paxton's help, Eleanor records a video in which she recites Jennifer Lopez's monologue from Hustlers to send to talent agents. Paxton finds his relationship with the shallow Phoebe to be boring and breaks up with her. Meanwhile, Fabiola and Aneesa struggle to make the transition from being friends to being a couple.
28	8	"...hooked up with my boyfriend"	Kim Nguyen	Christina Hjelm & Beth Appel	August 12, 2022
Devi sends Nalini, Kamala and Nirmala away to watch Shen Yun so she can host a game night between her and Des' friends to bond with him. However, Devi finds Des' intoxicated friend Parker, damaging her father's favorite tennis racket in the garage and Des leaves after finding Paxton consoling Devi in her bedroom, believing she is cheating on him. After the game night, Fabiola and Aneesa mutually break up after noticing the former's attraction towards Des' friend Addison and still remain as friends. Using Dr. Ryan's advice, Devi's repairs the tennis racket and searches for a place to hang it in honor of her father. She later reconciles with Des and they begin making out in his bedroom, but Rhyah walks in on them. In art class, Ben struggles to draw a pear but improves after being tutored by a peer named Margot.
29	9	"...had an Indian boyfriend"	Erica Oyama	Erica Oyama	August 12, 2022
Rhyah, Nalini, Des and Devi have an open conversation about Des and Devi's relationship. To everyone's surprise, Nalini allows Devi and Des to date as she considers him to be from a "respectable family". However, after seeing Devi have an anxiety attack at the orchestra show because she hallucinated seeing her father there, Rhyah orders Des to break up with Devi, calling Devi "crazy". Nalini later finds out about this and terminates her friendship with Rhyah. A dismayed Trent believes that his relationship with Paxton will end due to the latter's acceptance at Arizona State University, but realizes with Eleanor's help that Paxton will always be his friend. Fabiola begins dating Addison.
30	10	"...lived the dream"	Lang Fisher	Lang Fisher	August 12, 2022
Devi is accepted into Shrubland, a school for competitive students who are "academically gifted". Nalini and Devi initially agree to not send Devi to Shrubland. On Kamala's advice and after remembering why Mohan wanted to come to America, that is to give the best education to Devi, Nalini decides to visit Shrubland. After initial hesitation, Devi flies to Colorado with Nalini to visit the school and decides she wants to go. Disheartened, Ben attempts to persuade her not to go, which Devi initially misinterprets as jealousy. She talks with Ben about her inability to keep a boyfriend, after which Ben half-jokingly gives her a pass for "one free boink". Eleanor discovers at the senior graduation ceremony that Trent will be repeating his senior year, much to her excitement. During the ceremony, Paxton makes a speech in which he recognizes Devi's help in getting him into college. Devi realizes that she doesn't need to travel to fit in, as she already fits in at Sherman Oaks and is not ready to leave her mother yet. After an emotional conversation with her mother, they both agree that Devi doesn't have to attend Shrubland. Devi learns that Fabiola had sex with Addison, making Devi the only virgin among her friend group. She visits Ben, hands him the pass he gave her, and the two begin to kiss as the bedroom door closes behind them.

=== Season 4 (2023) ===
No. overall	No. in season	Title	Directed by	Written by	Original release date
31	1	"...lost my virginity"	Erica Oyama	Mindy Kaling	June 8, 2023
The aftermath of Ben and Devi's sexual encounter is awkward, with each feeling like they disappointed the other. As a result, Ben ignores Devi all summer while pursuing a relationship with Margot. Once senior year starts, Devi gets into a public feud with Margot over Ben. Devi's car is vandalized and she suspects Margot. Meanwhile, the formerly popular Paxton now feels out of place at Arizona State University, while Trent breaks up with Eleanor because he feels he will hold her back from her ambitions.
32	2	"...gotten sweet revenge"	Erica Oyama	Erica Oyama	June 8, 2023
Nalini tells Devi she will have to pay for the car repair, leaving Devi short on money to make the school's visit to New York campuses. Fabiola worries about the lack of women in the robotics club and realizes that the toxic masculinity that pervades the club alienates prospective female members. She successfully manages to recruit a girl named Michelle and makes the club more welcoming. Nirmala reveals her new boyfriend, Len, to the family. Eleanor decides to move on from Trent with their newly popular classmate, Ethan. Devi discovers Ethan vandalized her car, but her previous accusation of Margot has already driven a wedge between her and Ben. Paxton returns to Sherman Oaks for a job interview.
33	3	"...liked a bad boy"	Lena Khan	Gabe Liedman	June 8, 2023
Devi struggles with Ben avoiding her, while Ethan's apparent attraction to her makes her worry about betraying Eleanor. At a party, Ethan kisses both Eleanor and Devi, straining their friendship. Eleanor later realizes that she misses Trent, and allows Devi to pursue Ethan. Paxton wonders if he made the right decision to leave college to work at his old high school. Meanwhile, Nirmala commissions Margot's father Andres to replace the stairs in the house, but out of spite over Devi accusing Margot, Andres delays finishing the job. Nalini confronts him and he agrees to complete the repairs.
34	4	"...wrecked my future"	Dean Holland	Amina Munir	June 8, 2023
Devi believes that she can be both successful and sexy after she sleeps with and begins dating Ethan. She, Eleanor, and Fabiola attend the college fair where Devi cuts the line at the Princeton University booth and interrupts a prospective student, much to the displeasure of the representative. However, Devi is later able to convince the Princeton representative, Akshara, to speak with her during lunch. During the lunch, Ethan steals Akshara's wallet, prompting Devi to break up with him and return the wallet to Akshara. After Ben ruins his shirt, Devi allows him to borrow hers and he speaks with a representative from Columbia University. After Trent delivers advice, Paxton stands up to a student who belittled him. During the college fair, Fabiola learns that Princeton has a top-tier robotics program, and applies to Princeton Restrictive Early Action at her mother's behest, which risks putting her at odds with Devi, who also wants to be admitted. Kamala suspects that Len may be cheating on Nirmala.
35	5	"...been to New Jersey"	Dean Holland	Christina Hjelm & Carley Whitt	June 8, 2023
Devi, Ben, Fabiola, and Eleanor fly to New York with their classmates, as Mr. Shapiro and Ms. Warner chaperone. Devi goes to visit Princeton while Ben visits Columbia. Eleanor auditions at Juilliard with Fabiola providing support, as the latter avoids having Devi see her at Princeton. Devi meets Blair Quan, an overachieving Sherman Oaks alumna who got accepted into Princeton early. However, she becomes uneasy when she learns that Blair was expelled after suffering academic burnout. Ben is uneasy after his conversation with students at Columbia makes him feel unintelligent, while Eleanor becomes emotionally distraught after getting rejected from Juilliard. Fabiola, Eleanor and Ben take the train to join Devi at a party in Princeton. Ben is punched in the face after protecting Devi from a college guy assaulting her at the party. The chaperones catch them and the trip is cut short. Meanwhile, Nalini becomes lonely after she has the house to herself and invites Andres to join her after he comes to retrieve his phone.
36	6	"...had my dream stolen"	Kabir Akhtar	Asmita Paranjape	June 8, 2023
Devi gets deferred from Princeton while Fabiola is admitted, resulting in a rift between the two. However, the two reconcile after Paxton advises Devi and Fabiola to deliver an emotional essay in class. Devi becomes the swim team's equipment manager to get a varsity letter in a last-ditch attempt to gain more credentials for Princeton. Ben is accepted to Columbia, but he discovers that Margot is not committed to their relationship so he breaks up with her. Eleanor reveals to Devi and Fabiola that she is graduating a semester early to pursue her acting career. Kamala suspects that Len is trying to steal money from Nirmala after he proposes marriage to her, so she declines a job offer in Baltimore from Dr. Logan, her advisor, to stay and protect Nirmala.
37	7	"...had an identity crisis"	Kabir Akhtar	Marina Cockenberg	June 8, 2023
As swim team season begins, Paxton bonds with the recruits while trying to ignore his conflicting feelings about leaving ASU. He also reluctantly agrees to train Eric after school. The team throws a party at Paxton's, which is discovered by the substitute teacher, Lindsay. She tells him he should have handled it more maturely and stopped the party. During their next session, Eric tells Paxton that he keeps trying swimming because he does not want to give up on his dream, even if he fails; Paxton begins taking their training seriously. Devi and Paxton are locked in the equipment closet and they have an honest conversation about their college experiences. Coach Noble catches them kissing and lets Paxton off with a warning. Eric makes the swim team, inspiring Paxton, who starts becoming more comfortable as part of the school staff. Devi and Paxton talk about the kiss, agreeing that neither wants to pursue a relationship. Voiceover by Gigi Hadid.
38	8	"...set my mom up"	Adam Countee	Akshara Sekar	June 8, 2023
A week after Devi and Ben begin flirting through text, she realizes that Nalini is flirting with Andres and decides to support her mother. Ahead of Nirmala's birthday dinner, Kamala tries to convince Nalini that Len is conning Nirmala. Andres declines the invitation to the dinner because of the enmity between Margot and Devi, prompting Devi to make peace with Margot. After seeing this, Andres agrees to go to the dinner, and brings Margot along. After the dinner, Devi learns that Ben and Margot have been texting. Meanwhile, Eleanor runs into her mother on a movie set where they are both auditioning for roles. Trent helps Ben admit he has feelings for Devi, causing a stoned Ben to arrive at Devi's house with flowers for her. Kamala learns that the "Baby" in Len's phone is the name of his real estate agent. Kamala has a heart-to-heart with Nalini, Nirmala, and Devi, where Nalini encourages Kamala to take her advisor up on the Baltimore job offer. Andres asks Nalini out. Devi learns she has been waitlisted at Princeton, but was rejected from all the other Ivy League universities she applied to.
39	9	"...gone to prom"	Lang Fisher	Aaron Geary & Ben Steiner	June 8, 2023
On the day of prom, a shaken Devi lies to her mother and her friends that she got into all the Ivy League schools. When Eleanor vents to Trent about not getting any parts, he gives her the idea to direct her own films and act in them. Ben tries to catch up on the schoolwork he has missed due to severe "senior-itis" following his Columbia admission. At a robotics fair, Fabiola impresses a judge who teaches at Howard University. Akshara advises Devi to submit a supplemental essay to let Princeton know who she really is. Fabiola, Eleanor and Devi take a limousine to prom, only for Devi to scream from the stress and cause the limousine driver to crash the vehicle. The girls admit their secrets to each other and decide to skip prom. Fabiola announces her intention to attend Howard instead of Princeton. Eleanor gets back together with Trent and lets slip to Ben that Devi did not get into any colleges. Paxton helps chaperone the prom with Lindsay and begins to consider teaching. Ben and Dr. Ryan separately encourage Devi to never give up on Princeton, so she writes her essay about how her father shaped her life.
40	10	"...said goodbye"	Lang Fisher	Mindy Kaling & Lang Fisher	June 8, 2023
Devi is accepted into Princeton and wants to celebrate with Ben, but he is leaving for an internship in New York. She graduates valedictorian and spends the summer with her friends. Nirmala marries Len in a traditional Indian ceremony attended by Devi's friends; later, the girls affirm their friendship. Devi struggles with packing and saying goodbye; Nalini helps her and tells her that she is proud of her. Paxton, now in a relationship with Lindsay, returns to ASU to pursue teaching. Ben flies back from New York and surprises Devi at the wedding reception, where he and Devi admit they love each other. The two abscond to Ben's home and have sex; they later decide to give their relationship a shot in university, given the proximity of their campuses. Devi departs for Princeton. A montage shows snippets of the main characters' lives in the subsequent months: Fabiola wowing the robotics team at Howard, Eleanor directing a film with Trent providing help on set, Kamala eating ice cream and roaming on the streets of Baltimore with Manish, Devi and Ben enjoying a movie together in her dorm, Paxton studying at ASU, and Nalini removing her thaali as she continues to date Andres.

== Production ==
=== Development ===
On March 20, 2019, it was reported that Netflix had given a 10-episode series order to a then-untitled "semi-autobiographical comedy" created by Mindy Kaling, who would also serve as a writer, executive producer and showrunner alongside Lang Fisher. In an interview with The New York Times, Kaling said that Netflix was open to have a show "set in the '80s or the '90s, but I'd seen that done so well with shows like Fresh Off the Boat and Everybody Hates Chris. I really wanted to speak to kids now". The show's name, Never Have I Ever, was created by co-creator Lang Fisher, and Kaling said it was chosen because "[Devi's] ego is so caught up in the things she hasn't done yet, hasn't been exposed to yet. And that felt really kind of natural to her personality". Speaking to The Hindu, Kaling said the show was "definitely not based on my childhood but it is in the spirit of my childhood", adding "I was a shy nerd, but did not have the confidence Devi has".

On July 1, 2020, Netflix renewed the series for a second season.

On August 19, 2021, Netflix renewed the series for a third season.

On March 8, 2022, Netflix renewed the series for a fourth and final season.

=== Casting ===
In July 2019, Maitreyi Ramakrishnan was reported to be cast as Devi after Mindy Kaling put out an open casting call and received over 15,000 responses. John McEnroe was offered the role of narrating the series after Kaling had approached him during an Oscar party hosted by Vanity Fair.

All the actors met at the first table read and no "chemistry reads" were done between characters.

=== Filming ===
Principal photography of the first season began on July 14, 2019 and concluded on October 31, 2019. Filming for the second season started on November 10, 2020, at the Universal Studios in Los Angeles, and concluded at the end of March 2021. Filming for the third season started on November 29, 2021 and concluded on March 1, 2022. Filming for the fourth and final season concluded in early August 2022.

== Release ==
The first season was released on Netflix on April 27, 2020. The second season was released on July 15, 2021. The third season was released on August 12, 2022. The fourth and final season was released on June 8, 2023.

== Reception ==
=== Critical response ===
Critical response of Never Have I Ever
Season	Rotten Tomatoes	Metacritic
1	97% (61 reviews)	80 (18 reviews)
2	94% (36 reviews)	80 (8 reviews)
3	92% (25 reviews)	84 (6 reviews)
4	96% (23 reviews)	80 (7 reviews)

On Rotten Tomatoes, the first season holds an approval rating of 97% based on 61 reviews, with an average rating of 8.0/10; the second season holds a 94% based on 36 reviews and an average rating of 8.30/10; the third season has a rating of 92% and an average rating of 8.30/10 based on 25 reviews; the fourth season holds a 96% based on 23 reviews. The website's critical consensus for the first season reads, "Never Have I Ever's fresh take on the coming-of-age comedy is hilariously honest, sweetly smart, and likely to have viewers falling head over heels for charming newcomer Maitreyi Ramakrishnan". The website's critical consensus for the second season reads, "Though Never Have I Ever's sophomore season at times suffers from tonal commitment issues, nuanced writing and an utterly charming cast make it easy to forgive and enjoy," while the website's critical consensus for the third season reads, "Never has this charming coming of age series ever let down its fans, and this third season continues the winning streak by approaching the angst of teenage romance with frankness and charm." The fourth season, the website's critical consensus reads, "Chronicling its lovable band of high schoolers' senior year with characteristic charm and grace, Never Have I Ever graduates with full honors as an exemplary ode to growing pains." On Metacritic, the show has a overall weighted average score of 81 out of 100 based on 39 critics, indicating "universal acclaim".

Rohan Naahar from The Hindustan Times described the show as "something like Fresh Off the Boat, but it does a much better job at balancing the comedy and the drama", along with praising how Devi, Nalini, and Kamala were "written with depth". Naahar also praised how Devi's "repulsive [behavior] makes her a real person". Petrana Radulovic from Polygon stated that it was "easy to invest in [the] characters because they feel like real teenagers with real specificities", also praising the series for "highlighting little details in the Indian-American, first-generation immigrant, and Gen-Z high-school experiences", along with praising the "specific humor, which then fold into the plot and turn from just funny bits into meaningful commentary". In contrast to most other critics, Pallabi Dey Purkayastha from The Times of India described the show as going "overboard with stereotyping", mentioning "clichés circling the Indian diaspora that would have held some relevance if this were the 80s or 90s", although still rating the series 3.5 out of 5 stars and describing John McEnroe's narration as "hilarious".

Reviewing the second season, Nahaar from The Hindustan Times described the show as being "clearly the creation of someone who is separated by a palpable generational distance from their culture. But then again, this conflict is what Devi, and perhaps Kaling herself, are hounded by". Joshua Rivera from Polygon described the second season as "continuing to nail a tricky balance between heartfelt realism and Disney Channel absurdism". Divya Kala Bhanavi, writing for The Hindu, said the season "forces us to look at ourselves and acknowledge how much, during our teens, we were more problematic than we like to admit", along with praising how the season "tells the story of different shades of brown feminism across generations. Nalini's notions of what she must do for her family clash with that of her mother's, while Devi's beliefs in expressing her independence varies to those of Kamala". Candice Frederick from TV Guide felt it was "increasingly clear" that the narrator John McEnroe was "merely reciting lines with little authenticity". Inkoo Kang from The Washington Post felt the season was "crowded with characters", with conflicts that made it feel "bloated and weighed down".

Reviewing the third season, Meera Navlakha from Mashable criticized it for the "sheer number of relationships examined", stating that it meant some were "given less brevity and depth" and that plotlines were "often discarded too quickly". However, Navlakha also praised the season for "the idea of "being Indian" [being] explored in a nuanced storyline" and for "some fantastic one-liners and scenarios that blend culture in a way that's rarely seen on screen", along with noting a "thematic shift in the series, focusing more on identity, self-esteem, and change". Sonikka Loganathan from The Hindu praised Devi's character development, while adding that there were "arguably too many subplots afoot".

=== Jewish representation ===
Many critics have described the depiction of the Jewish character Ben Gross as being antisemitic. Mira Foxs from The Forward says "[Ben Gross is] a wildly rich nerdy suck-up, with an absent, workaholic Hollywood lawyer for a dad and negligent Jewish-Buddhist type for a mom. He falsely cries anti-Semitism when his classmates reject his (objectively terrible) idea for a class project. And he's dating a painfully stereotypical Jewish American princess named Shira, who he doesn't even like, in order to raise his own social clout; Shira, he tells Devi, is dating him for his money." By contrast, most of the supporting characters, such as Fabiola or Paxton, have been written to defy their ethnic stereotypes.

Evan Greenberg, writing for the feminist Jewish culture site Hey Alma, lodged similar complaints about Gross's character being "rooted in lazy stereotypes". Greenberg highlights Kaling's response to possible jokes being sensitive in an NPR interview, "...because I think the lead is what people would call, like, a marginalized person, like a young Indian American girl, I think we're able to get away with stuff because of a certain powerlessness that that demographic has in society [laughter], honestly," as problematic for a "young, impressionable audience."

In contrast, writer for Jewish parenting site Kveller, Lior Zaltman, praised the show, saying that Gross's character, set up as a typical high-achieving assimilated Jew, breaks into surprising depth and compares Devi's assimilation struggle between her cultural heritage and wanting to be a "cool American teen" to being raised Jewish in a secularized American education.

=== Indian representation ===
The portrayal of Indians in the series was inaccurate according to some critics. Deeksha Sharma of The Quint felt that Sendhil Ramamurthy's Indian accent was "fake". He received flak from Tamil audiences for saying "thakkali sambar" (transl. Tomato lentil soup) as "thakli sambar" despite being part Tamil himself. She added that the whole notion of the character of Jaya telling Kamala that she wished she just listened to her parents and "married the guy they chose" and that then she wouldn't have got divorced is problematic.

=== Audience viewership ===
At their Q2 report meeting in July 2020, Netflix reported the series had been viewed by 40 million households globally since its release.

Media Play News, citing U.S. streaming estimates from PlumResearch, reported that the fourth season of Never Have I Ever registered 2.8 million unique viewers on Netflix during the week of June 26–July 2, 2023.
