= Ramona Young =

American actress

- Born: Ramona Abish Young
- Education: California State University, Los Angeles
- Occupation: Actress
- Years active: 2010–present

Ramona Abish Young is an American actress. She is known for her recurring roles on the television series Man Seeking Woman, The Real O'Neals, and Santa Clarita Diet. Young is also known for her regular roles as Kaya on Z Nation, Mona Wu on Legends of Tomorrow and Eleanor on Never Have I Ever.

== Early life ==
Ramona was educated in both Hong Kong, her parents' homeland, and the United States off and on until she was eight years old. Young graduated early from California State University, Los Angeles and studied acting at Playhouse West. On her family, Young stated "I don’t have family in the business. My grandfather is an eastern doctor. My grandmother sold clothes on the sidewalk. My mother is in the Navy. My father is a psychologist and professor."

== Career ==
One of Young's first credited roles was an appearance in a 2014 episode of the short-lived ABC sitcom Super Fun Night. In 2015, she wrote, produced, and starred in a short film, titled Reflections. She also directed and did various other production duties on another short film, Live Exit Here, for which she additionally starred in, wrote, and produced.

In 2016, Young began portraying Kaya, an Inuk woman, during the third season of Syfy's Z Nation, later becoming a main cast member. She originally auditioned for the role of Sun Mei. That same year, Young was cast in another recurring role as Allison, a lesbian teenager, on the second season of ABC's The Real O'Neals.

In January 2017, Young joined the cast of FXX's Man Seeking Woman in a recurring capacity as Robin for the third season. The following month, Young was featured in the Netflix series Santa Clarita Diet, playing an eponymous deadpan store clerk in all three seasons. In 2017, she was also cast as a series regular in the Fox comedy pilot Thin Ice. The project was later passed on.

Young portrayed Angelica in the 2018 comedy film Blockers. In July 2018, it was announced that Young had joined the main cast of The CW's Arrowverse series Legends of Tomorrow as Mona Wu (previously named Alaska Yu) for the show's fourth season.

In 2020, it was revealed that Young had joined the cast of Mindy Kaling's Netflix series Never Have I Ever.

In 2025, Young voiced Dr. Annabelle in Super Duper Bunny League.

== Personal life ==
Young is a Second-generation Chinese American. She speaks Mandarin and Cantonese fluently and can understand a few less widely known dialects because of her grandmother. Young has been doing martial arts since about the age of four. She specifically practices Brazilian jiu-jitsu. On April 19, 2026, Young announced she was engaged.

== Filmography ==
=== Film ===
Key
†	Denotes works that have not yet been released

Year	Title	Role	Notes
2010	Specter	Eve / Ghost	Short
2015	Live Exit Here	N/A	Also director, writer, producer, etc.
2015	Twelve	Missy Tollegs	
2015	Wanderers	Catalina	Short
2015	Reflections	Florence Ming	Short; Also writer & producer
2016	Star-Crossed	Dipper	Short; Also writer
2016	Subversion	Brit Jones	Short
2016	The Thinning	Adele	
2016	Set Life	Paula	Short
2016	Harry Decisions	N/A	Cinematographer
2016	Date Night	Ava / Candace / Kaylee	Short
2017	Amuse'd	Ramona	Short
2018	Blockers	Angelica	
2018	All About Nina	Mika	
2018	Bottomland	Marilyn	Short
2020	Unpregnant	Emily	
2022	The Prank	Tanner	
2022	Wendell & Wild	Sweetie (voice)	
2023	Ruby Gillman, Teenage Kraken	Bliss (voice)	
2024	Half Baked: Totally High	Cori	
2025	You're Cordially Invited	Kelly	

=== Television ===
Year	Title	Role	Notes
2012	This Indie Thing	Kevin's Rude Fan	Episode: "A Little Respect"
2014	Super Fun Night	Geeky Girl #2	Episode: "Cookie Prom"
2016–2018	Z Nation	Kaya	Main role (seasons 3-5)
2016–2017	The Real O'Neals	Allison Adler-Wong	Recurring role (season 2)
2017	Man Seeking Woman	Robin	Recurring role (season 3)
2017–2019	Santa Clarita Diet	Ramona	Recurring role
2017	Thin Ice	Isis	Unsold pilot
2017	Review	Bo	Episode: "Co-Host, Ass-Slap, Helen Keller, Forgiveness"
2017	Flip the Script	The Grip	Episode: "Diva Director"
2018–2020	Legends of Tomorrow	Mona Wu	Main role (season 4), recurring role (season 5); 17 episodes
2020-2023	Never Have I Ever	Eleanor Wong	Main role
2023	Gremlins: Secrets of the Mogwai	Fox Spirit (voice)	Episode: "Always Buy a God a Drink First"
2023	After Midnight	Self	Episode: "Thursday, Feb 6, 2025"
2025	Super Duper Bunny League	Dr. Annabelle (voice)	Main role
2025–present	The Paper	Nicole	Main role

=== Music video ===
Year	Title	Role	Notes
2016	If Your BFFs Breakup Were a Music Video	Rachel	BuzzFeed Video
