= List of Z Nation episodes =

Z Nation is an American horror-comedy-drama/post-apocalyptic television series that airs on Syfy, created by Karl Schaefer and Craig Engler, and produced by The Asylum. The first season of 13 episodes premiered on September 12, 2014.

On December 15, 2017, Syfy renewed the series for a fifth season, which premiered on October 5, 2018. On December 22, 2018, Syfy canceled the series after five seasons. The 68th and ultimate episode aired on December 28, 2018, concluding the five-season series.

== Series overview ==
Season	Episodes	Originally released	
Season	Episodes	First released	Last released
1	13	September 12, 2014	December 5, 2014
2	15	September 11, 2015	December 18, 2015
3	14	September 16, 2016	December 16, 2016
4	13	September 29, 2017	December 15, 2017
5	13	October 5, 2018	December 28, 2018

== Episodes ==
=== Season 1 (2014) ===
No. overall	No. in season	Title	Directed by	Written by	Original release date	U.S. viewers (millions)
1	1	"Puppies and Kittens"	John Hyams	Karl Schaefer	September 12, 2014	1.58
Hammond and Murphy make their way to Camp Blue Sky en route to a high school in Sleepy Hollow, New York, where they expect to be airlifted to Mt. Wilson Laboratory in Los Angeles. Meanwhile, Citizen Z is the sole occupant of an NSA outpost in the Arctic after the rest of the crew is killed during a botched evacuation. Hammond and Murphy link up with several other survivors after Blue Sky is overrun. The high school is abandoned, and the only survivors appear to be a baby and a mysterious stranger, Cassandra. The baby unexpectedly turns into a zombie and kills Hammond. The group then encounters another mysterious survivor, later revealed to be 10K.
2	2	"Fracking Zombies"	John Hyams	Michael Cassutt	September 19, 2014	1.62
The group attempts to refuel their vehicles at the "Jersey Devil Refinery" in northern New Jersey after being tipped off by a suspicious survivor. They use a music box to distract the zombies. Cassandra is revealed to have run away from a group, with its leader Tobias sending people to find her. Murphy reveals to Doc that he has a phobia of the zombies as a result of being bitten. From the Arctic Circle, Citizen Z is still keeping an eye on everyone, instructing Garnett to bring Murphy to California. The group make a narrow escape from an explosion at the refinery, as 10k runs up to the truck with fuel. Citizen Z finds a dog in the snow outside.
3	3	"Philly Feast"	Luis Prieto	Eric Wallace and Karl Schaefer	September 26, 2014	1.14
In Philadelphia, the team meets the group Cassandra has been trying to escape from. Cassandra reveals that she was previously part of a cannibalistic cult, acting as a prostitute to lure people so the cannibal group could kidnap and eat them. This group, led by a man named Tobias Campbell, wants Cassandra back. As Addy is trying to contact Citizen Z, she is abducted by members of the cult, who take her back to Tobias. The team confronts Tobias and trades Cassandra for Addy. Doc poses as a customer looking for Sunshine, while the team leads a horde of zombies toward the cult, blasting music from their truck with the help of Citizen Z. The team drives off, leaving the cult to fend for themselves.
4	4	"Full Metal Zombie"	Michael Robison	Eric Bernt	October 3, 2014	1.55
Citizen Z informs the team that General McCandless in McLean, Virginia may be able to give them an airlift directly to California. The survivors fight a large zombie soldier with a metal plate in his head, which renders him immune to head shots. The general is insane and his helicopter is no longer able to fly.
5	5	"Home Sweet Zombie"	Luis Prieto	Dan Merchant	October 10, 2014	1.26
The team goes to Warren's hometown of Castle Point, Missouri (mistakenly listed as in Illinois), as Warren tries to find closure about her husband Antoine. Meanwhile, a zombie tornado threatens the entire mission.
6	6	"Resurrection Z"	John Hyams	Craig Engler	October 17, 2014	1.57
The group arrives in Hannibal, Missouri and takes shelter in a base led by Garnett's former squadmate, Joe Williams. A cult led by a man named Jacob has been indoctrinating people to do their deeds. Several cult members infiltrate the base by returning and pretending to renounce the cult. As zombies and Jacob's people overrun the compound, Garnett is killed by Jacob while blocking a bullet for Murphy.
7	7	"Welcome to the FU-Bar"	Abram Cox	Jennifer Derwingson	October 24, 2014	1.34
In western Kansas, the team stops at a saloon called the Fu-Bar, just as a giant zombie herd heads into town. Mack and Addy get separated and head off on their own. Some traveling salesmen they met in episode 1 are in town to hold a zombie shooting contest. 10K enthusiastically enters and wins. The prize is a Barrett M82 rifle, which he decides to give to Brittany, the girl who came in second. Murphy discovers his saliva renders a normal human immune to the zombie virus when he bites a man in a fight who is later killed and does not reanimate.
8	8	"Zunami"	John Hyams	Dan Merchant	October 31, 2014	1.10
The group is forced to hunker down in a Nebraska town as the zombie tsunami comes in. Citizen Z encounters a Russian cosmonaut who seems to be at Northern Lights for a purpose. This cosmonaut is revealed to be a figment of his oxygen-deprived imagination, which is trying to warn Citizen Z about the failing air supply.
9	9	"Die Zombie Die ... Again"	Tim Andrew	Dan Merchant and Karl Schaefer	November 7, 2014	1.30
Mack and Addy debate abandoning the rest of the group and the mission. Mack believes a zombie has killed Addy at their campsite, but he repeatedly awakens from a nightmare in a manner reminiscent of Groundhog Day. All of these repeating episodes turn out to be a dream that Addy is having, and she realizes the flashbacks she has been experiencing are a repressed memory of killing her reanimated mother.
10	10	"Going Nuclear"	Nick Lyon	Craig Engler and Michael Cassutt	November 14, 2014	1.49
The group takes a detour through South Dakota to avoid the zombie tsunami. In Edgemont, a nuclear reactor is about to melt down, an occurrence that Amelia and her father are desperately trying to thwart. When the father is killed, the group's only resort is to turn to another former worker, Homer Stubbins. Homer has isolated himself in his fortress since his son was killed at the onset of the outbreak. Amelia agrees to fly Murphy out of the fallout zone should the reactor melt down. Murphy learns he can influence the zombies' actions.
11	11	"Sisters of Mercy"	Rachel Goldenberg	Jennifer Derwingson	November 21, 2014	1.40
Mack and Addy reunite with the rest of the group. They encounter an all-female commune whose leader, Helen, agrees to shelter only the three women of the group, as she believes all men are evil. The group discovers that the commune's boys are forced to leave when reaching age 13. A man who abused his wife is thrown into a barn to be eaten by a zombie bear.
12	12	"Murphy's Law"	Tim Andrew	Michael Cassutt	November 28, 2014	1.61
Murphy is kidnapped by three survivors: Zimmerman, Janis, and Henry. They drive to a zombie-infested Mesa Pharmaceuticals warehouse, planning to use Murphy's immunity to help them steal drugs. Murphy discovers he has mind control abilities over humans as well as zombies by spitting in his abductors' canteens.
13	13	"Doctor of the Dead"	John Hyams	John Hyams and Karl Schaefer	December 5, 2014	1.44
In a series of pre-apocalypse flashbacks, a man is shown extracting brain matter from a Krokodil addict, a Liberian Ebola patient, a Haitian voodoo zombie and an inspector at the Russian bioweapons facility at Semipalatinsk. The team expects to meet Dr. Merch at a facility in Fort Collins, Colorado, but arrives to find the personnel have been killed. They discover that this lab is where the virus was first transmitted from lab monkeys to humans. The man from the flashback arrives instead of Dr. Merch and explains that he will take Murphy the rest of the way to California. Murphy gives mercy to patient zero, a lab technician who has been an inanimate zombie hybrid for three years. The season ends with a cliffhanger, as Murphy's exit from the containment lab without proper decontamination triggers the mass launch of tactical nuclear weapons, shown headed for the lab as well as the NSA site from which Citizen Z operates, along with various cities all over the world, turning the zombie apocalypse into a nuclear apocalypse.

=== Season 2 (2015) ===
No. overall	No. in season	Title	Directed by	Written by	Original release date	U.S. viewers (millions)
14	1	"The Murphy"	John Hyams	Karl Schaefer	September 11, 2015	0.94
The team is split up as they try to outrun the impending blast of the launched nuclear warheads as the nukes reduce cities all over the world into smoldering nuclear wastelands. Citizen Z finds himself battling thawed zombies and unable to communicate with the team after the nuke aimed for Camp Northern Lights is intercepted by the base's anti-missile defense system and detonated still in flight. In a desperate attempt to help them out on their quest to get to California and the CDC, Citizen Z issues an on-air bounty for Murphy. Warren nearly dies before reuniting with Doc, 10K, Mack and Addy. They travel to Cheyenne, Wyoming, where they find Murphy and Cassandra. They also encounter several bounty hunters, the most prominent being Vasquez, who engages the group in conflict over who will take Murphy to the CDC. Murphy and Cassandra escape during the ensuing shootout. (Michelle Hippe; Larry Koopa's voice actress, guest stars in this episode)
15	2	"White Light"	John Hyams	John Hyams	September 18, 2015	0.88
The group is attacked by various bounty hunters and are caught in a shootout. Each member of the group goes through near-death experiences as they are almost killed by anonymous bounty hunters. Vasquez saves Warren from a bounty hunter. Mack is bitten after being caught in a zombie-infested stairwell. Addy shoots Mack in the head immediately after he turns.
16	3	"Zombie Road"	Dan Merchant	Dan Merchant	September 25, 2015	0.99
As they escape Cheyenne, the group encounters a convoy heading up to Edmonton, Alberta. They hitch a ride with this convoy, but soon encounter trouble in the form of blasters: radioactive zombies created from the nuclear blast and fallout. Doc, Murphy and Cassandra are introduced to "Z weed" by a convoy member. The leader of the convoy has been affected by radiation poisoning, and the group has to escape as the convoy is overcome by the blasters. Murphy again separates from the rest of the group and, joined by Cassandra and a survivor from the convoy, drive to a lab in Minneapolis.
17	4	"Batch 47"	Alexander Yellen	Michael Cassutt	October 2, 2015	0.90
Murphy and Cassandra arrive at a greenhouse that is infested with zombie-plant hybrids. The source of "Z weed," the greenhouse also contains Batch 47, which the lab's resident leader claims will cure the zombie virus. The leader sends in volunteer after volunteer to attempt to retrieve a sample, but no one has succeeded thus far. Due to his telepathic connection with zombies, Murphy is able to retrieve a sample of Batch 47. Initial test results on a decapitated zombie look promising, but they eventually find out that it also turns humans into zombies. Meanwhile, Citizen Z transmits the coordinates of the CDC lab to Addy, but due to static interference, she copies down the wrong coordinates. Shortly after leaving the greenhouse, the group encounters Serena, a girl who is pregnant with Murphy's unborn child.
18	5	"Zombaby!"	Rachel Goldenberg	Jennifer Derwingson	October 9, 2015	0.88
The group travels to a Mennonite community in time for Serena to give birth to a baby girl. 10K and Addy are infected with anthrax. Despite the Mennonites being helpful and cooperative to the group, Warren is forced to rob the Mennonites of their remaining rations of antibiotics in order to save 10K and Addy. A zombie horde attacks the group shortly after the baby is born, and in the ensuing fight, Serena is bitten and has to be shot by Warren.
19	6	"Zombie Baby Daddy"	Abram Cox	Craig Engler	October 16, 2015	0.84
The group winds up in Springfield, Illinois, where they fight off zombies. Murphy separates from the group out of fear that they may take the baby away and kill it. Vasquez separates from the group, and when he fails to return, Warren tracks him down. The two are injured and wind up at an abandoned hospital, where Vasquez reveals that he was searching for the man who killed his wife and kids. Under orders from Murphy, Cassandra stops the group from looking for Murphy. 10K is forced to kill Cassandra when they wind up in conflict. Murphy finds a couple in an isolated home, bites them and leaves the baby in their care before rejoining the group.
20	7	"Down the Mississippi"	John Hyams	John Hyams	October 23, 2015	0.76
The group travels south by boat along the Mississippi River towards Memphis, Tennessee. They encounter a jam of zombies in the river that attack the boat. The group dive into the river to escape, and 10K is separated. While searching for the group, 10K encounters two men, Sketchy and Skeezy, who convince 10K that they know how to find his group. The trio come upon a settlement and, due to a misunderstanding, are tried for theft and lying and sentenced to death by hanging by the group's leader, known as Escorpion. Luckily, 10K befriended one of the group members earlier, and told her where he was planning to meet his group. She finds and leads them to rescue 10K.
21	8	"The Collector"	Dan Merchant	Dan Merchant	October 30, 2015	0.87
Murphy wanders from the group and falls into a trap set out by a zombie collector. While in captivity, Murphy is forced to recount the entire history of how he came to be the person that he is now. The rest of the group searches for Murphy in a small town. 10K finds him, but is also captured by the zombie collector. The rest of the group arrive to rescue Murphy and 10K.
22	9	"RoZwell"	Jason McKee	Craig Engler	November 6, 2015	0.84
The group encounters a community of people near Roswell, New Mexico. It is led by a woman named Bernadette, who claims to be in contact with aliens. 10K believes that there is a hidden underground base, which Warren deduces could contain potentially working radio equipment or transportation to get to the CDC lab faster. They ask Bernadette to lead them to this underground base. Along the way, they encounter and kill what appears to be a zombified alien. Eventually, they confront two alien life forms, one of which attempts to abduct Bernadette. They fatally injure the alien abductor, who turns out to be one of the community members dressed in a special suit. He was also the last test pilot of the hidden base before it was overrun by zombies.
23	10	"We Were Nowhere Near the Grand Canyon"	Juan A. Mas	Eric Bernt	November 13, 2015	0.67
The group is traveling about 100 miles north of Flagstaff. Citizen Z warns them of a zunami horde approaching. The RV that they are driving breaks down and the group is forced to split up to look for more transportation. Murphy, Warren, Vasquez and Addy encounter a group of Native Americans at a casino, led by Danny. 10K and Doc are captured by a different Native American group, led by Danny's estranged son, Gordon. Gordon leads 10K and Doc into a trap and leaves them to die, but they are rescued by Gordon's sister, Ayalla. Meanwhile, Warren advises Citizen Z on how to operate a rocket launcher to kill off the last remaining zombie at the station. Ayalla convinces 10K and Doc to travel with her to warn Danny of the zunami horde. Danny tells his group to join Gordon's group in the cliffs, but decides to stay behind himself to honor his dead wife's memory. The zunami horde destroys the casino and heads towards the group at the cliffs. At Doc's suggestion, the group works with Gordon's group to successfully enact a plan to divert and drive the zunami horde off the cliffs.
24	11	"Corporate Retreat"	Jodi Binstock	Micho Rutare	November 20, 2015	0.77
The team encounters a group of survivors at a hotel who had been there since the outbreak. Led by Gideon, the group governs itself by group decisions based on facilitating trust and dialogue. The team separates to further investigate the hotel. Both Murphy and one of the other group are shot, bringing everyone to the scene. While unconscious, Murphy has visions. Zombies converge on the hotel, telepathically drawn by Murphy's dreams. The two groups convene to determine who shot Murphy. Gideon decides Iggy is guilty and banishes him. The real shooter is still at large, and attempts to shoot two more people, including Doc. All are trapped in the main lobby as the zombies from the hotel break out of their rooms. In a panic, the shooter identifies himself and attempts to leave with Dana, but is shot by a half-turned zombie. Iggy returns and kills Gideon. Both groups leave the hotel and go their separate ways.
25	12	"Party with the Zeros"	Abram Cox	Lynelle White	November 27, 2015	0.92
The group is near the Mexican border, surrounded by zombies. They are rescued by Escorpion, who leads them to meet "La Reina," the Queen of the Dead. As a bounty for Murphy, La Reina offers the group a choice - leave with a reward or stay and join her group. Vasquez warns Warren that it is a trick and they will be killed if they try to leave. The group accepts the offer to join La Reina's group. During the party held to induct the group as members, Vasquez has recognized Escorpion as the killer of his wife and daughter, and attempts to shoot Escorpion. Warren stops him to save the mission. Kurian claims to have used Murphy's blood to generate a cure for the zombie virus. La Reina picks Vasquez as the test subject to prove whether the cure will work.
26	13	"Adios, Muchachos"	Abram Cox	Jennifer Derwingson	December 4, 2015	0.97
Warren suggests to La Reina that Kurian should be the first test subject and he is forced to inject himself. Kurian is then bitten by a decapitated zombie, but survives. La Reina and her followers are all injected with the cure. Kurian reveals that everyone who was injected with the cure will come under Murphy's control after an incubation time. Escorpion tortures Vasquez to find out Warren's true intentions. Murphy exerts control over La Reina and has her order Escorpion to be seized. Murphy's influence on La Reina's group starts to wear off as the team rescues Vasquez and Kurian attacks Murphy. Warren and the team, pursued by La Reina and her minions, arrives in time to behead Kurian. Murphy frees a mass of imprisoned zombies to stop La Reina's group. The team escape only to be followed by Escorpion. Vasquez and Escorpion fight until Vasquez throws Escorpion down hatch to be eaten by zombies. The team finds five Chevy El Caminos and drive toward California.
27	14	"Day One"	Dan Merchant	Michael Cassutt	December 11, 2015	0.83
In a flashback prologue, Simon Cruller (Citizen Z) recalls how he wound up at the North Pole. As the group makes their way across California, each member has a flashback about what they were doing on day 1 of the zombie outbreak. Meanwhile, someone has hacked the system at the North Pole, and while tracking down the hacker, Citizen Z discovers that he is being used to find Murphy. The group arrives at the coordinates of the CDC lab to find a decrepit house. Warren and Vasquez enter the house, to be greeted by a lady who is hiding some weapons.
28	15	"All Good Things Must Come to an End"	John Hyams	Karl Schaefer and Daniel Schaefer	December 18, 2015	1.10
Citizen Z tries to warn the group to abort the mission because the location has been compromised, but is unsuccessful. Meanwhile, another group arrives at the house and tries to claim the bounty for finding Murphy. In the ensuing conflict, 10K is shot. The woman signals for Dr. Merch to come to the house. A group of armed men led by the captain of the submarine and Dr. Merch arrives to escort Murphy (and 10K) away. After they leave, a group of armed men led by La Reina arrives, looking for Murphy. Warren's group retreats back into the house, where the woman provides them with a stash of hidden weapons. Meanwhile, the captain reveals to Murphy his intentions to take them to Zona, which is an island that is free of zombies. Dr. Merch reveals that they attempted to develop a zombie cure but had mixed results, but now Murphy's blood will help them to achieve success. La Reina confronts Warren, demanding to know where Murphy is. In the ensuing conflict, La Reina is about to kill Warren, only to be killed by Escorpion. Vasquez disarms Escorpion, and threatens to kill him. In the end, Vasquez spares the repentant Escorpion's life but decides to leave the group. Escorpion joins Doc, Addy and Warren as they arrive at a beach to see the submarine on fire. They also see Murphy leaving in a boat with Dr. Merch, the captain and three of the crew, just before they are captured by some foreign guards. 10K is nowhere to be seen. The final scene shows Murphy's daughter having a tea party with some zombies. On Netflix, this episode is called "End Times".

=== Season 3 (2016) ===
No. overall	No. in season	Title	Directed by	Written by	Original release date	U.S. viewers (millions)
29	1	"No Mercy"	Abram Cox	Karl Schaefer and Daniel Schaefer	September 16, 2016	1.06
In this (85-minute long) flashback story from season 2, the gang protects the town against a new enemy known as "The Man". Vasquez is strangely absent.
30	2	"A New Mission"	Dan Merchant	Dan Merchant	September 23, 2016	1.03
In the season 3 premiere, Warren and gang are taken prisoner, while Murphy escapes the sub with his newly formed group of blends, Dr. Merch, and 10K. Sun Mei arrives with a commando team capturing the team, Doc, Warren, Addy & Hector and moves to collect a supply drop but run into the “Enders” - psychotic humans. The supplies are stolen by Murphy and his blended team including 10K.
31	3	"Murphy's Miracle"	Alexander Yellen	Michael Cassutt	September 30, 2016	0.86
Murphy begins starting his new world plans in Spokane. Warren leads the new mission group to a strange town with a single inhabitant a USPS worker who has an affinity with the town zombies. The USPS worker went “postal” on day one of the apocalypse & killed all his co-workers & customers. He keeps the zombies fed with brains from travellers passing through the town. Sun Mei fights & escapes him in the emergency shelter trapping him with zombies.
32	4	"Escorpion and the Red Hand"	Jason McKee	Steve Graham	October 7, 2016	0.85
More people flock to Murphy's new cult. The others are stuck in the middle of a war and discover someone using El Escorpion's name in a new gang called the Red Hands.
33	5	"Little Red and the WolfZ"	Juan A. Mas	Jennifer Derwingson	October 14, 2016	0.80
10K escapes from Murphy with the help of Dr. Merch. Injured and alone, he is stalked by a blend under Murphy's control and a pack of zombie wolves. Dr. Merch commits suicide instead of helping Murphy create more blends.
34	6	"Doc Flew Over the Cuckoo's Nest"	Dan Merchant	Tye Lombardi	October 21, 2016	0.77
Doc is captured by the chief nurse and residents of a mental hospital for the criminally insane, Serenity Falls. Doc meets up with 10K who has a seizure and he must cross "Z" ward to the pharmacy. Doc helps the patients escape on a school bus and leaves on foot with a recovered 10K.
35	7	"Welcome to Murphytown"	Jodi Binstock	Jodi Binstock	October 28, 2016	0.72
The Man discovers Lucy's existence. 10k & Doc reunite with the gang and 10K tells them about Murphy's growing army.
36	8	"Election Day"	Andrew Drazek	Delondra Williams	November 4, 2016	0.87
Doc and Addy run into Sketch and Skezzy when the Murphymobile isn't working. Sketch is running for president of the Apocalypse.
37	9	"Heart of Darkness"	Abram Cox	Michael Cassutt	November 11, 2016	0.92
Warren and the others inspect Murphytown and realize they are going to need a bigger army to extract Murphy. Warren turns to El Escorpion for help and finds an old ally.
38	10	"They Grow Up So Quickly"	Alexander Yellen	Craig Engler	November 18, 2016	0.77
Doc and Addy try to convince Lucy's family to follow them. Murphy tests 10K's allegiance.
39	11	"Doc's Angels"	Youssef Delara	Natalia Fernandez	November 25, 2016	1.01
Doc tries to find a way to communicate with Warren, but instead encounters something much more menacing. Three women welcome Doc into their compound and ply him with comforts.
40	12	"The Siege of Murphytown"	Dan Merchant	Dan Merchant	December 2, 2016	0.74
Warren leads an attack against Murphytown to extract its smug leader.
41	13	"Duel"	Jennifer Derwingson	Jennifer Derwingson	December 9, 2016	0.76
Addy is being pummeled with whatever The Man can throw at her, and Lucy does the same to The Man.
42	14	"Everybody Dies in the End"	Abram Cox	Abram Cox	December 16, 2016	0.87
The gang reunites and faces the biggest battle yet.

=== Season 4 (2017) ===
No. overall	No. in season	Title	Directed by	Written by	Original release date	U.S. viewers (millions)
43	1	"Warren's Dream"	Abram Cox	Karl Schaefer	September 29, 2017	0.58
Two years later, things have gotten worse. Warren awakens from a coma to find herself in ZONA with Murphy apparently cured. As she is introduced to this seemingly utopian and affluent society, she's plagued by visions of a black rainbow. Meanwhile, the rest of the group is still struggling to survive amid the arrival of a new threat – unkillable "Mad Zs" caused by a mutation of the Zombie Virus. Each of them faces the choice of whether to stay put, or to head for Newmerica: a rumored safe haven from the apocalypse.
44	2	"Escape from Zona"	Abram Cox	John Hyams	October 6, 2017	0.55
Driven by her dream of a black rainbow and flesh eating rain, Warren and Murphy escape Zona; Doc, 10K and Sarge are pinned down by snipers.
45	3	"The Vanishing"	Alexander Yellen	John Hyams	October 13, 2017	0.58
By the time Warren and the others make it to the refugee camp, Red and Sun Mei have mysteriously vanished along with everyone else. After convincing 10K to give up the search for Red, Murphy and the others decide to head to Newmerica with Sarge – but Warren has her own plan. Driven by her dream, Warren is compelled to head east instead of north.
46	4	"A New Mission: Keep Moving"	Keith Allan	Delondra Williams	October 20, 2017	0.62
Following Warren's dream, the team doesn't stop while crossing The Great Pile, a seemingly endless landscape of rubble and destruction.
47	5	"The Unknowns"	J.D. McKee	Craig Engler	October 27, 2017	0.60
The team is captured by an Unseen Force and enslaved in an elaborate underground facility, forced by their mysterious captors to perform a series of bizarre, dangerous tasks.
48	6	"Back From the Undead"	Alexander Yellen	Michael Cassutt	November 3, 2017	0.58
Lucy fights to save Murphy's life; Warren and the others battle a biologically modified Franken-Zombie guarding a clue to Warren's dream.
49	7	"Warren's Wedding"	Steve Graham	Steve Graham	November 10, 2017	0.65
Shaken by the death of one of the team, something snaps in Murphy, and Warren is unable to stop him and the others from committing an atrocity as misplaced revenge.
50	8	"Crisis of Faith"	Jennifer Derwingson	Jennifer Derwingson	November 17, 2017	0.64
Warren and the others encounter a mysterious stranger who they think is a grave robber but is something much more.
51	9	"We Interrupt This Program"	Dan Merchant	Dan Merchant	November 24, 2017	0.62
Back at the dawn of the apocalypse, newly promoted news anchor Carly McFadden struggles with office politics and office zombies as unsettling reports start to come through to the news desk. Eight years later, the group explores the abandoned TV station as they look for a way to contact Kaya at camp Northern Light as she attempts to hide from an invasion of ZONA forces. Fearing the worst when her hideout is breached, she takes a last stand, only to find that Citizen Z has returned home after two years.
52	10	"Frenemies"	Juan A. Mas	Abram Cox	December 1, 2017	0.52
In Chicago, Doc and Murphy encounter Sketchy, Skeezy and others at a barbershop, though the others continually attempt to betray them.
53	11	"Return to Mercy Labs"	Jodi Binstock	Jodi Binstock	December 8, 2017	0.57
The group returns to Mercy Labs, where they first encountered The Man, to retrieve another item that Warren's dreams show her.
54	12	"Mt. Weather"	Dan Merchant	Craig Engler	December 15, 2017	0.61
The group arrives at Mount Weather to find the remains of the government and learns they need the thumbprint of the President of the United States to achieve Warren's goal. They meet the remains of the government and learn more about what Warren's dreams are, and that the government has plans that differ from their own.
55	13	"The Black Rainbow"	Abram Cox	Karl Schaefer and Daniel Schaefer	December 15, 2017	0.56
The team arrives in Washington D.C., and goes to finish Warren's goal. This causes Warren to realize why her dreams are happening, and that she was trained to activate the Black Rainbow, not stop it. When she attempts to stop it, a scientist from Zona interferes. She is sent off in a jet as it activates, and Murphy is struck by flesh-eating bacteria while trying to save her. As the Black Rainbow becomes a reality, 10K and Lilly start a relationship, while Doc and Murphy silently watch what they believe to be the end of the world.

=== Season 5 (2018) ===
No. overall	No. in season	Title	Directed by	Written by	Original release date	U.S. viewers (millions)
56	1	"Welcome to the Newpocalypse"	Abram Cox	Karl Schaefer	October 5, 2018	0.54
After Warren crashes and stumbles across the countryside, she is rescued after collapsing at a farm, nursed to health, and then begins to start keeping up the farm and the house with the man who saved her, the ruggedly handsome Cooper. Meanwhile, Murphy, Doc and the rest of the gang are picking up survivors on their way to Newmerica. Murphy senses that Warren is out there somewhere, and he is determined to find her, so he sets his own path and tracks her, eating zombie brains for their memories of Warren's path. Doc and the rest of the group continue on their mission. Some of their new companions are acting a little Z-like: Mrs. McGillicuddy is eating zombie brains on the side of the road. When they finally get to Newmerica, a woman named George introduces them to the harsh new reality: since the reset and the black rain, there are now some people who turn into Zs that are not just “walkers” but also “talkers”. Three of their companions on this journey are actually talkers. These Z-like people eat Z-Bizkits to keep them from eating brains. Everybody treks off to a bigger Newmerican outpost. Anyone thing that can talk, alive or dead, is welcome. Warren and her new friend Cooper get very cozy playing happy home, cooking together, working together, playing dominos, dancing, shooting Zs. When Warren finds out Cooper has a secret, she helps him dispose of it with fire. Murphy spots smoke from the burning pyre which leads him to Roberta.
57	2	"A New Life"	Alexander Yellen	Michael Cassutt	October 12, 2018	0.51
Warren and Cooper keep a cozy fire going in their new farmhouse life. Murphy shows up, and Cooper clobbers him and locks him in the trunk of his car. When Warren finds out, she is not coaxed by Cooper's fears of her leaving him, and instead she clocks him, saves Murphy and puts Cooper in the trunk. Cooper's fate is unknown as there are zombies heading his way as Murphy and Warren leave for Newmerica. After Warren and Murphy reunite with the gang, Doc, 10K and Sgt. Lilly welcome them to Altura. They are about to have a vote on whether or not to form Newmerica and create a new democracy of survivors, including zombie “talkers” along with the humans. Sun Mei, Citizen Z and Red are there. Red has a confusing, then lovely, reunion with 10K. George, who knew Warren back during Black Summer, is fighting hard for a new society. She encourages everyone to vote and is excited about the future. The “CEO” of the town, Roman Estes, hands her the results of the vote to read on the podium. The room of Alturans is giddy with excitement, and as George begins to walk to the podium there's an explosion. There are some suspicious zombies walking around including a mysterious, half-face lady, Pandora.
58	3	"Escape from Altura"	Alexander Yellen	Dan Merchant	October 19, 2018	0.37
The delegates for the Newmerica vote have been victims of a bombing. There are now some new zombies, and some outsider zombies also swarm in. This appears to have been a sabotage - there's a hole in the fence and the Altura community quickly goes into lockdown. CEO Estes quarantines the talkers, who are not given Z-biscuits which results in a bunch of hungry, angry Zs penned in together. Murphy makes a run for it, having jumped onto the back of a van driven by George's talker friend Dante, who is now suspect number one in the bombing. Warren, Citizen Z, Doc and George decide to break out of the lockdown and head to Pacifica, looking for Dante and answers. Murphy has a stalker who turns out to be a friend and offers him a ride somewhere new after he falls out of Dante's van. Meanwhile, 10K, Sarge, Red and Sun Mei are all fighting it out against the Z hordes when 10K gets bit. Red cuts his hand off at the bite, and Sarge makes the ultimate military-style sacrifice, dying to save her friends.
59	4	"Pacifica"	Jodi Binstock	Jodi Binstock	October 26, 2018	0.40
Reeling from the loss of Sgt. Lilly, 10K and Red participate in a ceremony for those lost in Altura . They memorialize people with a DNA wall. Meanwhile, on their trek to Pacifica while hunting for Lt. Dante, Warren, Doc, Citizen Z and George meet up with some familiar faces. Pacifica, described as a paradise, turns out to be a bit more combative than anticipated. The community is in conflict due to the bombing, and people are worried about the talkers revolting, and there is talk of a quarantine, just like in Altura. Warren and George make a powerful case for unity, and everyone agrees to sleep on it. The next day dawns in Pacifica with a talker escape and a zombie attack. Back in Altura, 10K worries he won't recover with a missing trigger finger or hand, despite the support of Red. Roman Estes, the benevolent CEO, continues to act super creepy. He is interested in Sun Mei's research.
60	5	"Killing All The Books"	Juan A Mas	Jennifer Derwingson	November 2, 2018	0.46
A new spate of terrorist bombings has now hit Pacifica. The search for survivors leads to many more dead and some brand new talkers. Just like the Altura attack, this bombing is followed up by a wave of Zombie attacks. Doc does some triage and finds out how these bombings might be triggered. Alturan mercenaries take human survivors back with them; no talkers allowed. Citizen Z, Kaya, JZ and Nana decide to go back to Altura and see what they can learn. Talkers in Pacifica stay back and try to salvage books from the heavily damaged library. Doc, Warren and George strike out on their own, looking for Dante and for answers.10K is unhappy with his hook hand. Wandering around Altura, he sees some suspicious goings-on. His nosing around leads him to hide in a truck, soon to be packed with hungry Zs.
61	6	"Limbo"	Dan Merchant	Delondra Williams	November 9, 2018	0.46
Doc, Warren & George find Murphy's “Limbo” nightclub where talkers can get bizkits as prizes. Addy, George & Warren find Dante. Murphy bets “Limbo” on a card game but cheats using his powers to see the cards. Altura troops arrest Dante & kill Marjorie.
62	7	"Doc's Stoned History"	Jared Briley	Collin Redmond	November 16, 2018	0.53
The team set out to the biskit bakery to find out why the supply has stopped. Claire & Doc travel to Altura to help Dante, along the way Doc outlines the USA constitution. The biskit recipe is on the bakery owner who has turned. Doc & Claire find the empty Altura transport.
63	8	"Heartland"	Steve Graham	Steve Graham	November 23, 2018	0.45
Addy, 10K & Warren travel to Heartland to find the source of biskit flour & meet Doc & Claire. The farm run by Finn & Charlie that grows the wheat has been attacked and its talker workforce is scattered. The team round up the talkers and feed them Charlie's brains who has been badly injured in the attack. The team travel to the dam held by the Water Keepers to find why the water has stopped.
64	9	"Water Keepers"	Jennifer Derwingson	Jennifer Derwingson	November 30, 2018	0.44
The team are ambushed by the Water Keepers a Native American group. They meet up with Kursk and Ayalia from the Grand Canyon. The dam has been attacked by talkers and the chief is trying to repair the damage when he is attacked by a walker. Doc & Warren undertake a spirit journey to help the Water Keepers retake the dam and restore the water.
65	10	"State of Mine"	Stuart Acher	Dan Merchant	December 7, 2018	0.47
Talkers enslaved in a dump revolt after eating batteries & their leader is decapitated after entering an entrance in the dump. Warren and George spy on the Altura soldiers in the dump whilst Doc & 10K spy on the Altura processing site. Warren falls into an underground chamber and sees a figure with multiple battery-powered devices. The team attack the processing site and discover why Altura is mining the dump and fight the being until its battery power runs out.
66	11	"Hackerville"	J.D. McKee	Michael Cassutt	December 14, 2018	0.43
With some help from an outpost of renegade hackers, Warren and George hack Altura's defenses and discover Estes' secret plan.
67	12	"At All Cost"	Dan Merchant	Dan Merchant	December 21, 2018	0.40
Estes imprisons the captive Talkers and Blends, while Warren and George plan their attack on Altura.
68	13	"The End of Everything"	Alexander Yellen	Karl Schaefer	December 28, 2018	0.48
The heroes try to bring Estes and Pandora to justice. Cooper reappears and shocks Warren with a new revelation.

== Ratings ==
Z Nation : U.S. viewers per episode (millions)

Season	Episode number														
Season	1	2	3	4	5	6	7	8	9	10	11	12	13	14	15
1	1.58	1.62	1.14	1.55	1.26	1.57	1.34	1.10	1.30	1.49	1.40	1.61	1.44	–	
2	0.94	0.88	0.99	0.90	0.88	0.84	0.76	0.87	0.84	0.67	0.77	0.92	0.97	0.83	1.10
3	1.06	1.03	0.86	0.85	0.80	0.77	0.72	0.87	0.92	0.77	1.01	0.74	0.76	0.87	–
4	0.58	0.55	0.58	0.62	0.60	0.58	0.65	0.64	0.62	0.52	0.57	0.61	0.56	–	
5	0.54	0.51	0.37	0.40	0.46	0.46	0.53	0.45	0.44	0.47	0.43	0.40	0.48	–	

Audience measurement performed by Nielsen Media Research
