= Pisay Pao =

American actress (born 1984)

- Born: Pisay Pao; November 1, 1984 (age 40); Thailand
- Occupation: Actress
- Years active: 2005 to Present

Pisay Pao (born November 1, 1984) is an American actress. She is best known for her role as Cassandra in the Syfy series Z Nation.

== Early life ==
Pao was born on November 1, 1984, in Thailand, at a refugee camp where her Cambodian parents were placed to escape political persecution during the Cambodian Civil War. Her parents were granted political asylum in the United States in 1986, and settled in Seattle, Washington, where she was raised. Pao stated that she was attracted to the arts from an early age, and began painting, drawing, dancing, and performing as a child. She obliged her parents' wishes to focus on an academic career instead, earning a scholarship to attend the University of Washington. However, she left her university course to instead pursue a career in fashion and the performing arts.

== Career ==
Pao has credited the movie The Motel for showing her there was space for Asian American stories in visual culture. Pao was introduced to a talent agent through a friend that was a model. Pao stated that she exercised several times per week to prepare for her role in the TV series Z Nation. Pao reportedly often attends comic book conventions to meet fans, and has expressed her wish to portray Marvel Comics super hero Storm. In addition to film and TV work, she also appeared in the play what you are now, from Sam Chanse, at the Ensemble Studio Theatre in New York.

== Personal life ==
Pao has stated that her parents' struggle to escape the Cambodian civil war is an inspiration for her work.

Pao is also a Christian.

Pao has travelled to Cambodia to visit her family members who remained there. Her first trip was in 2001.

Pao is a self-professed advocate for women's rights. She has stated that she "wants to find a way to bring justice for all women who are victims of sexual violence."

== Filmography ==
=== Film ===
Year	Title	Role	Notes
2005	Simply Fobulous	Chantavy	
2009	The Whole Truth	Inona Kim	
2010	Your Lucky Day	Wife	
2012	Door to Door	Dee	
2018	Bitter Melons	Sophia	
2019	Velvet Buzzsaw	Attorney	
2019	We Take the Low Road	Hospice Worker	

=== Television ===
Year	Title	Role	Notes
2014–2016	Z Nation	Cassandra	Main role season 1&2 guest season 3
2016	NCIS: Los Angeles	Jamie Patterson	Episode: "Core Values"
2019–2020	Doom Patrol	Oyewah	7 episodes

=== Video games ===
Year	Title	Role	Notes
2018	State of Decay 2	Lynne (Medical Nurse)	Live action role
