= Michael Cassutt =

American television producer, screenwriter, and author

Michael Joseph Cassutt (born April 13, 1954) is an American television producer, screenwriter, and author. His notable TV work includes producing or writing, or both, for The Outer Limits, Eerie, Indiana, Beverly Hills, 90210, and The Twilight Zone. In addition to his work in television, Cassutt has written over thirty short stories, predominately in the genres of science fiction and fantasy. He has also published novels, including the 1986 The Star Country, the 1991 Dragon Season, the 2001 Red Moon and the 2011 Heaven's Shadow, in collaboration with David S. Goyer. In addition, Cassutt contributes non-fiction articles to magazines and is the author of the non-fiction book, The Astronaut Maker, a biography of NASA legend George W. S. Abbey (2018).

== Early life ==
Although born in Owatonna, Minnesota, Cassutt was raised in Hudson, Wisconsin, where he graduated from Hudson High School. He attended the University of Arizona in Tucson, graduating with a Bachelor of Arts degree in radio-television. He then worked as a disc jockey and radio program director and as a network television executive for CBS. During his time at CBS he contributed freelance scripts to such television series as Alice and The Twilight Zone.

== Career ==
=== Television ===
A full-time writer since 1985, Cassutt was staff writer for the 1985 revival series, The Twilight Zone, story editor for the acclaimed Max Headroom series on ABC, and writer-producer for the CBS series TV 101.

In the early 1990s Cassutt worked as a writer and producer for WIOU, an ensemble drama starring John Shea and Helen Shaver, and then for Eerie, Indiana. From 1992 to 1993 Cassutt was producer and writer for the ABC police drama Sirens; he later wrote the two-part premiere of the show's syndicated version with series creator Ann Lewis Hamilton.

Following his tour on The Outer Limits, Cassutt was co-executive producer for the Fox drama Strange Luck and consulting producer on Beverly Hills, 90210 and Seven Days.

He was executive consultant for USA Network's The Dead Zone. Cassutt's first episode, "The Mountain", was the highest-rated episode of the show's 2003 season; his second, "Total Awareness," which premiered in July 2004, was the only episode of the show ever reviewed by People magazine.

Cassutt was co-executive producer for SyFy Channel's Z Nation for five seasons, from 2013 to 2018, contributing ten scripts. He worked on its spinoff, Black Summer as well.

He has contributed freelance scripts to seaQuest DSV, Stargate SG-1, Farscape, Andromeda, and Odyssey 5. He has developed scripts based on classic science fiction works by writers such as Arthur C. Clarke, Robert A. Heinlein, Clifford Simak, and Philip Jose Farmer. Among other projects are pilot scripts for Nickelodeon and MTV; a TV movie remake of the 1978 thriller film, Capricorn One; and Time's Eye, a Hallmark Channel and Sci-fi Channel miniseries based on the novel of the same name by Arthur C. Clarke and Stephen Baxter.

In 2018 and 2019 he worked on two potential Wild Cards series for Hulu; neither effort was produced.

Cassutt has also appeared on camera in two History Channel documentaries, Disasters in Space, in 1999, and Star City, in 2002, as well as a 2002 BBC special about astronauts and test pilots. He appeared on the History Channel series The Universe first in the November 2008 episode and again in October 2009.

His adaptation of Howard Waldrop's Nebula Award-winning novelette The Ugly Chickens was filmed as a short starring Felicia Day and directed by Mark Raso in Toronto, Summer 2023.

=== Other writings ===
Alongside his career in television, Cassutt has also pursued a career in writing fiction, especially science fiction and fantasy. His first short story, "A Second Death," appeared in the June 1974 issue of Amazing Stories. Since that time he has published over thirty other pieces of short fiction, many in The Magazine of Fantasy & Science Fiction and in Asimov's Science Fiction magazine. He also contributed stories to the annual collection, The Year's Best Science Fiction, in the fourteenth and nineteenth editions, and to Year's Best SF 15.

He has authored a science fiction novel, The Star Country, published by Doubleday in 1986, and a fantasy novel, Dragon Season, published by Tor Books in 1991. With Andrew M. Greeley, he co-edited an anthology of science fiction and fantasy stories with Catholic themes, entitled Sacred Visions, also published by Tor in 1991.

Working with screenwriter and director David S. Goyer (Batman Begins, Blade, The Unborn) Cassutt wrote an SF trilogy. The first volume, Heaven's Shadow, was published by Ace (publisher) in July 2011. The second, Heaven's War, appeared in July 2012. The trilogy concluded with Heaven's Fall in August 2013.

In addition to science fiction and fantasy, Cassutt has written thrillers with spaceflight settings, beginning with Missing Man, published in September 1998, to praise from such diverse sources as Publishers Weekly, Analog magazine, and the NASA Watch website. A sequel, Tango Midnight, dealing with an accident aboard the International Space Station, was published in 2003.

His historical thriller, Red Moon, a novel of the dark side of the space race between America and the Soviet Union, appeared in March 2001 and became the subject of an entire article in Asimov's Science Fiction, written by novelist Norman Spinrad.

Cassutt is also an experienced writer of non-fiction, not only contributing articles to such magazines as Space Illustrated, Space World, Air & Space and books such as Magill's Survey of Science: Space Exploration Series, but as the author of the biographical encyclopedia, Who's Who in Space. The book contains biographies and photos of seven hundred astronauts and cosmonauts from around the world, for which Cassutt conducted dozens of interviews over a period of ten years.

His monthly column about science fiction television and film, "The Cassutt Files," appeared on SciFiWire.com from 2000 to 2009. He has also taught TV writing at the University of Southern California's School of Cinematic Arts, and at the University of Oregon.

More recently, Cassutt has published several new short stories, in Isaac Asimov's Science Fiction Magazine, on Tor.com, and in The Magazine of Fantasy and Science Fiction and Analog Science Fiction and Science Fact.

== Awards and recognition ==
In 1989, Cassutt won the Nancy Susan Reynolds Award of the Center for Population Options for a three-part episode, "First Love," on the series TV 101, although the series itself was not a success and ran for only thirteen episodes.

== Personal life ==
Cassutt lives in Los Angeles with his wife, Cindy, and two children, Ryan and Alexandra.

== Bibliography ==
=== Novels ===
- The Star Country (Doubleday, 1986)
- Dragon Season (Tor, 1991)
- Missing Man (Forge, 1998)
- Red Moon (Forge, 2001)
- Tango Midnight (Forge, 2003)

Heaven's Shadow series

1. Goyer, David S. & Michael Cassutt (2011). Heaven's Shadow. New York: Ace.
2. — & — (2012). Heaven's War. New York: Ace.
3. — & — (2013). Heaven's Fall. New York: Ace.

=== Short fiction ===
Anthologies (edited)

- Sacred Visions (Tor, 1991, anthology edited with Andrew M. Greeley)

Stories

|- | |}

- "A Second Death" – "Amazing Science Fiction", June 1974
- "The Streak" – "Mike Shayne Mystery Magazine", January 1977
- "Hunting" – "Universe 8", 1978, ed. Terry Carr
- "The Squeeze" – "Mike Shayne Mystery Magazine", January 1981
- "The Free Agent" – "The Magazine of Fantasy & Science Fiction", August 1981
- "The Holy Father" – "Best of OMNI 6", 1983, ed. Don Myrus
- "Stillwater, 1896" – "Shadows 7", 1984, ed. Charles L. Grant
- "A Star is Born" – "Isaac Asimov's Science Fiction Magazine", July, 1984
- "Legend" – "Wild Cards IV", 1988, ed. George R. R. Martin
- "Passages" – "Synergy 4", 1989, ed. George Zebrowski
- "Mules in Horse's Harness" – "What Might Have Been, Vol. 2", 1989, ed. Gregory Benford and Martin H. Greenberg
- "At Risk" – "Isaac Asimov's Science Fiction Magazine", July 1990
- "Curious Elation" – "The Magazine of Fantasy & Science Fiction", September 1990
- "Extraordinary Measures" – "The Magazine of Fantasy & Science Fiction", July 1991
- "The Last Mars Trip" – "The Magazine of Fantasy & Science Fiction", July 1992
- "Perpetual Light" – "Grails (anthology)" 1992, ed., Ed Kramer, Richard Gilliam & Martin H. Greenberg
- "A Method of Reaching Extreme Altitudes" – "Wild Cards", 1993, ed. George R. R. Martin
- "The Folks" – "The Magazine of Fantasy & Science Fiction", July 1993
- "Night Life" – "Borderlands III", 1993, ed. Thomas F. Monteleone
- "The Longer Voyage" – "The Magazine of Fantasy & Science Fiction", July 1996
- "Generation Zero" – "Asimov's Science Fiction Magazine", October/November 1996
- "Jinx" – "The Magazine of Fantasy & Science Fiction", July 1997, as "Leo Kenden"
- "More Adventures on Other Planets" – "Sci.Fiction", January 10, 2001
- "Beyond the End of Time" – "Sci.Fiction", June 20, 2001
- "Storming Space" – "Wild Cards", 2002, ed. George R. R. Martin
- "Skull Valley" – "Isaac Asimov's Science Fiction Magazine", October/November 2007
- "Captain Cathode and the Secret Ace" – "Wild Cards IV", 2010, ed. George R. R. Martin. This story was not in the 1987 edition of Wild Cards
- "Pitching Old Mars" - "Asimov's Science Fiction Magazine", March 2013
- "The Big Bleed" - "Wild Cards", Tor 2014, ed. George R. R. Martin & Melinda M. Snodgrass
- "The Sunset of Time" - "OLD VENUS", Random House anthology 2015, ed. George R. R. Martin & Gardner R. Dozois
- "Timewalking" - "Isaac Asimov's Science Fiction Magazine", November/December 2017
- "Unter" - "Asimov's Science Fiction Magazine", June/July 2018
- "The Vetting" - "Tor.com", September 18, 2019
- "Banshee" - "The Magazine of Fantasy & Science Fiction", January 2020
- "Have Spaceship, Will Travel" - "Wild Cards", Tor 2021 ed. George R. R. Martin
- "Luna Incognita" - "Joker Moon as "Leo Kenden"
- "Aurora" - "Asimov's Science Fiction Magazine", novelette, March/April 2022
- "Kingsbury 1944" - "Analog Science Fiction & Fact Magazine", novella, September/October 2022
- "Flicker" - "Asimov's Science Fiction Magazine", November/December 2022
- "Proxima Centauri Blues" - "Analog Science Fiction & Fact Magazine", November/December 2023
- "The Scalar Intercepts" - "Asimov's Science Fiction Magazine", January/February 2024

=== Non-fiction ===
- Who's Who in Space: The First Twenty-five Years (G. K. Hall, 1987)
- Who's Who in Space: The International Space Year Edition (Macmillan, 1993)
- Deke! U.S. Manned Space from Mercury to the Shuttle (Forge 1994, with Donald K. "Deke" Slayton)
- Who's Who in Space: The International Space Station Edition (Macmillan Gale, 1999)
- We Have Capture: Tom Stafford and the Space Race (Smithsonian, 2002, with Thomas P. Stafford)
- The Astronaut Maker: How One Mysterious Engineer Ran Human Spaceflight for a Generation (Chicago Review Press, 2018)

=== Critical studies and reviews of Cassutt's work ===
Heaven's Fall

- Sakers, Don (November 2015). "The Reference Library". Analog Science Fiction and Fact. 135 (11): 105–108.

== Television credits ==
- Gloria (1982)
- Love, Sidney (1982)
- Alice (1983)
- It’s Not Easy (1983)
- Dungeons & Dragons (1985)
- Misfits of Science (1985)
- The Twilight Zone (1985-1987)
- Simon & Simon (1986)
- The Centurions (1986)
- Max Headroom (1987)
- The Wizard (1987)
- Beauty and the Beast (1988)
- TV 101 (1988)
- WIOU (1990)
- Eerie, Indiana (1992)
- Sirens (1993)
- seaQuest DSV (1993)
- Strange Luck (1995)
- The Adventures of Sinbad (1996)
- Mr. & Mrs. Smith (1996)
- Beverly Hills, 90210 (1997)
- Seven Days (1999)
- Farscape (2000)
- Stargate SG-1 (2000)
- Andromeda (2002)
- Odyssey 5 (2003)
- The Dead Zone (2003-2004)
- Transformers: Prime (2013)
- Z Nation (2014-2018)
