= Strange Luck =

- Created by: Karl Schaefer
- Starring: D. B. Sweeney; Pamela Gidley; Cynthia Martells; Frances Fisher
- Composer: Mark Mothersbaugh
- Country of origin: United States
- Original language: English
- No. of seasons: 1
- No. of episodes: 17

Production
- Running time: 45 minutes
- Production companies: MT2 Services; Unreality, Inc. New World Entertainment

Original release
- Network: Fox
- Release: September 15, 1995 – February 23, 1996

Strange Luck is an American television series that aired on Fox, created by Karl Schaefer and starring D. B. Sweeney in the role of Chance Harper who constantly stumbles into unusual situations. The series aired on Fox from 1995 to 1996. A total of seventeen episodes were aired before the show was canceled due to low ratings. Reruns were shown briefly on the Sci Fi Channel in 1997. The series was initially slotted as a lead-in to The X-Files on Friday nights, and was largely shot in Canada like the show which followed it.

== Plot ==
Chance Harper, a freelance photographer, is afflicted with a bizarre tendency to always be in the wrong place at the right time. As Chance himself says, "If I go to a restaurant, somebody chokes. If I walk into a bank, it gets robbed." Harper's strange luck began when, as a small child, he was the sole survivor of a plane crash that killed everyone else aboard, including his mother and sister.

== Cast ==
- D. B. Sweeney as Chance Harper
- Pamela Gidley as Audrey Westin
- Cynthia Martells as Dr. Richter
- Frances Fisher as Angie
- Drew Monroe as Spirit
- Scott Plank as Arthur Vandenberg

== Production ==
=== Casting ===
D. B. Sweeney had been primarily a film actor before taking the role of Chance Harper. He did so because he had a series of unsuccessful low-budget films and decided to try his hand at television. He commented that "Fox has spent more time and money and effort promoting me and this show than all of my movies put together"

== Episodes ==
No.	Title	Directed by	Written by	Original release date
1	"Soul Survivor"	David Carson	Karl Schaefer	September 15, 1995
2	"Over Exposure"	David Jackson	John J. Sakmar & Kerry Lenhart	September 22, 1995
3	"Last Chance"	Ralph Hemecker	Michael Cassutt	September 29, 1995
4	"She Was"	Elodie Keene	Karl Schaefer	October 6, 1995
5	"Blind Man's Bluff"	John McPherson	Melinda M. Snodgrass	October 13, 1995
6	"Angie's Turn"	Greg Beeman	Cathryn Michon	October 20, 1995
7	"Hat Trick"	Martha Mitchell	Matt Dearborn	November 3, 1995
8	"The Liver Wild"	David Jackson	John J. Sakmar & Kerry Lenhart	November 10, 1995
9	"Walk Away"	James Whitmore Jr.	Page Turner	November 17, 1995
10	"The Box"	John T. Kretchmer	Michael Cassutt	December 1, 1995
11	"Brothers Grim"	Greg Beeman	John J. Sakmar & Kerry Lenhart	December 8, 1995
12	"Trial Period"	David Jackson	Matt Dearborn	December 15, 1995
13	"Healing Hands"	John T. Kretchmer	Scott Smith Miller	January 5, 1996
14	"Wrong Number"	Mark Sobel	Michael Cassutt	January 19, 1996
15	"In Sickness and in Wealth"	Scott Brazil	Babs Greyhosky	February 2, 1996
16	"Blinded by the Son"	Jim Charleston	Andy Hedden & Rob Hedden	February 9, 1996
17	"Struck by Lighting"	Brad Turner	Eric Overmyer	February 23, 1996

== Awards ==
Year	Association	Category	Nominated artist/work	Result
1996	Primetime Emmy Award	Outstanding Sound Editing for a Series	Andrew Spencer Dawson (supervising editor), Stacey Nakasone (dialogue editor), Rich Cusano (sound effects editor), Richard Webb (sound effects editor); For episode "The Liver Wild".	Nominated
