= Keith Allan (actor) =

American actor

- Born: July 1, 1969 (age 57)
- Education: The American Academy of Dramatic Arts
- Occupations: Actor, screenwriter
- Years active: 2000–present
- Known for: Z Nation
- Notable work: Social Nightmare (2013); Z Nation (2014)

Keith Allan (born July 1, 1969, in Sacramento, California) is an American actor. Projects he has worked on include Social Nightmare and Z Nation.

== Education ==
Following high school, Allan moved to Los Angeles to study acting at the American Academy of Dramatic Arts. After school Allan moved to Colorado, and began performing as stage actor.

== Career ==
Keith started working with B movie production company The Asylum, best known for the Sharknado (film series) as a stage manager. He would write and star in a few films for them, including 11/11/11 and Rise of the Zombies. When The Asylum started branching into Television, Allan was cast as Murphy, appearing in the show from 2014-2018. Keith had bit part in numerous productions, including Buffy the Vampire Slayer, Star Trek: Enterprise and The Good Doctor.

== Filmography ==
=== Acting ===
Year	Title	Role	Notes
2000	Meat Loaf: To Hell and Back	Tim Curry	
2000	ARK, the Adventures of Animal Rescue Kids	The Great Illusion	TV series, episode: "Black Magic"
2000	Charmed	Assistant #2	TV series, episode: "Magic Hour"
2000	Will & Grace	Photographer	TV series, episode: "Gypsies, Tramps and Weed"
2000	Buffy the Vampire Slayer	Skinny Mental Patient	TV series, episode: "Listening to Fear"
2001	Comedy Central Thanxgiveaway: Home Fires	Maurice	TV movie
2002	Three Sisters	Answering Machine (voice)	TV series, episode: "'Twas the Night Before"
2002	CSI: Crime Scene Investigation	Fashion Photographer	TV series, episode: "The Hunger Artist"
2002	Star Trek: Enterprise	Suliban Commander Raan	TV series, episode: "Shockwave: Part 2"
2002	The Truth About Beef Jerky	Count Nugent	
2003	Dragnet	Willard	TV series, episode: "The Little Guy"
2003	Jack Woody	Wallace	Short
2004	What I Like About You	Omar	TV series, 2 episodes
2006	Scrubs	Bartender	TV series, episode: "My Deja Vu, My Deja Vu"
2006	Close to Home	Mark Shale	TV series, episode: "Deacon"
2008	Turbo Dates		TV series, episode: "White Dress"
2009	The Perfect Sleep	The Grand Inquisitor M.D.	
2009	Wizards of Waverly Place	Wally	TV series, episode: "Halloween"
2010	Big Time Rush	Pitchman	TV series, episode: "Big Time Dance"
2011	Victorious	Michael (Music Executive)	TV series, episode: "The Diddly-Bops"
2012	Air Collision	Navy SEAL #2	Video
2012	Mad Men	Steven Chase	TV series, episode: "Far Away Places"
2012	Rise of the Zombies	Tash	TV movie, also a screenwriter
2012	Don't Trust the B— in Apartment 23	Peter	TV series, episode: "Sexy People"
2013	The Neighbors	Roulette Dealer	TV series, episode: "It Has Begun...", Season 1 Episode 22
2013	Social Nightmare	Mr. Perryman	TV movie, also a screenwriter
2013	Welcome to the Family	Principal	TV series, episode: "Pilot"
2013	Zombie Night	Looter (as Keith Allen)	TV movie, also a screenwriter
2014–2018	Z Nation	Alvin Murphy	TV series, main cast
2014	The Shoot (2014)	Mack	
2014	Kill Me, Deadly		
2017	The Good Doctor	Quinn's father	Episode: "She"
2020	Stumptown	Tim Scott	Episode: "The Past and the Furious"

=== Writing ===
Year	Title	Role	Notes
2008	Billy and Sally Go Bionic	Writer	Short
2011	11/11/11	Screenplay	video
2012	Rise of the Zombies	Screenwriter	TV movie
2013	Social Nightmare	Screenwriter	TV movie
2013	Ragin Cajun Redneck Gators	Screenwriter	TV movie
2013	Zombie Night	Screenplay	TV movie
