= Zombie Night (2013 film) =

2013 American film

- DVD cover
- Screenplay by: Keith Allan; Delondra Williams
- Story by: Richard Schenkman
- Directed by: John Gulager
- Starring: Anthony Michael Hall; Daryl Hannah; Jennifer Taylor; Alan Ruck; Shirley Jones
- Theme music composer: Alan Howarth
- Country of origin: United States
- Original language: English

Production
- Producer: David Michael Latt
- Cinematography: Damian Horan
- Editor: Bobby K. Richardson
- Running time: 88 minutes
- Production company: Indy Entertainment

Original release
- Network: Syfy
- Release: December 10, 2013

Zombie Night is a 2013 American zombie horror film directed by John Gulager, written by Keith Allan and Delondra Williams from a story by Richard Schenkman, and starring Anthony Michael Hall, Daryl Hannah, Jennifer Taylor, Alan Ruck, and Shirley Jones.

== Plot ==
In a small California town, two families must survive a zombie attack until sunrise.

== Cast ==
- Anthony Michael Hall as Patrick Jackson
- Daryl Hannah as Birdy Lincoln-Jackson
- Alan Ruck as Joe Madden
- Rachel G. Fox as Tracie Jackson
- Shirley Jones as Barbara Lincoln
- Jennifer Taylor as Karin Madden
- Daniel Ross Owen as Perry Madden
- Gibson Bobby Sjobeck as Nathan Madden
- Zoe Canner as Irina
- Tia Robinson as Janice
- Rogelio T. Ramos as Officer Vincent Lopez
- Diane Ayala Goldner as Officer Johnson
- Meg Rutenberg as Rachel
- Hayley Derryberry as Bloody Woman
- Keith Allan (as Keith Allen) as Looter
- Esteban Cueto as Groundskeeper
- Jordan James Smith as Jared
- Destiny Hernandez as Teresa
- James Mullen Henderson as Desperate Man
- Jane Osborn as Desperate Woman
- Nicholas S. Williams as Churchgoer

== Production ==
Director John Gulager used amputees to portray zombies. He cited special effects as one of the highlights of a zombie film.

== Release ==
Zombie Night premiered on Syfy on October 26, 2013, and it was released on DVD on December 10, 2013.

== Reception ==
Michael Storey of the Arkansas Democrat-Gazette called it a sub-par zombie film that lacks humor or camp. Brian Lowry of Variety called it "a brain-dead exploitation pic" that is "an almost comically amateurish effort". Andrew Dowler of Now wrote, "Zombie Night brings enough energy, skill and gore to its basic Night Of The Living Dead story to provide light entertainment on a chilly night."
