= Rise of the Zombies =

- DVD cover
- Genre: Action; Horror; Thriller
- Written by: Keith Allan; Delondra Williams
- Directed by: Nick Lyon
- Starring: Mariel Hemingway; LeVar Burton; Danny Trejo
- Theme music composer: Chris Ridenhour
- Country of origin: United States
- Original language: English

Production
- Executive producer: David Rimawi
- Producers: David Michael Latt; Paul Bales
- Cinematography: Alexander Yellen
- Editor: James Kondelik
- Running time: 90 minutes
- Production company: The Asylum

Original release
- Network: Syfy
- Release: October 27, 2012

Rise of the Zombies, also known as Dead Walking, is a 2012 American zombie horror film from The Asylum and directed by Nick Lyon. Written by Keith Allan and Delondra Williams, the film was initially titled Dead Walking, but was eventually changed to Rise of the Zombies. The film stars Mariel Hemingway, Chad Lindberg, LeVar Burton, and Heather Hemmens, and first aired on Syfy on October 27, 2012.

== Plot ==
A water-borne virus has led to a widespread outbreak of zombies in San Francisco. A group of survivors, including Dr. Lynn Snyder (Mariel Hemingway) and others, create a refuge on Alcatraz Island. Snyder receives communications from Dr. Arnold (French Stewart), a scientist conducting experiments to create a cure for the virus. Meanwhile, Dr. Dan Halpern (LeVar Burton), another of the refugees, is studying parts culled from the bodies of the zombies, but he is unable to make much headway because he only has access to 'dead' zombies. His research is further hindered when Caspian (Danny Trejo) and other refugees burn the zombie corpses being stored on the island.

A horde of zombies are washed onto the island by the tides, causing panic in the camp. While they are defeated, many of the refugees are killed, and two are infected by the virus, one of them being Halpern's daughter, Julie (Kerisse Hutchinson). The survivors decide to set out for the mainland, while Halpern stays to study the two infected victims. Later in the film, Halpern is forced to kill himself by detonating a grenade when his daughter bites him, before the virus can claim him as well.

The group on the mainland splits in two because of conflicting goals. Snyder wishes to find Dr. Arnold, as she believes he has found a cure, while Caspian's group instead wants to find supplies and ultimately reach what they believe to be an evacuation point. Caspian and several others are soon infected, and the group's numbers dwindle. It is eventually revealed that the 'evacuation point' has already been overrun by the zombies, rendering escape seemingly impossible.

As the group siphons gas from a car, Ashley commits suicide on a trolly by rolling it down the street colliding with a bus.

The last survivors of the group - Snyder, Kyle (Chad Lindberg) and Marshall (Ethan Suplee) - discover Dr. Arnold's refuge, the water treatment plant where the outbreak began. Arnold reveals that he has indeed discovered a cure, based on his tests on animal subjects. As the five flee for a chopper on the roof of the plant, both Kyle and Marshall are attacked, but Arnold's vaccine saves them. The group escapes the city, and Arnold requests a laboratory to manufacture his cure, expressing optimism that anything is possible.

== Cast ==
- Mariel Hemingway as Dr. Lynn Snyder
- Chad Lindberg as Kyle
- Ethan Suplee as Marshall
- LeVar Burton as Dr. Dan Halpern
- Heather Hemmens as Ashley
- Hector Luis Bustamante as Ramon
- Danny Trejo as Captain Caspian
- French Stewart as Dr. Arnold
- Madonna Magee as Vivian
- Andy Clemerce as Bob
- Peter Ngo as Jud Nagase
- Lilan Bowden as Jun Nagase
- Kim Little as Pauline
- Kerisse Hutchinson as Julie Halpern
- Jon Kondelik as Jason
- Lorenzo Eduardo as Park Ranger Sanchez
- Angelique Cinelu as Letty
- Keith Allan as Tash
- John A. Lorenz as Kenny
- Tia Robinsin as Sarah
- Kieran Gallagher as Brian
- Leslie Garbett as Victoria
- William Sturtervant as Hero Zombie
- Mercy Malick as Undead Housewife
- Aleh Neliubin as Zombie
- Charles Peeke Jr. as Zombie
- Frank Forbes as Hero Zombie
- Hayden Forbes as Zombie
- Dale Pulliam as Zombie
- Miranda Rae as Zombie

== Production ==
In July 2012, it was announced the completed film would screen in October as part of Syfy's "31 Days of Halloween" programming block.

== Reception ==
Rise of the Zombies premiered on October 27, 2012 with 1.28 million viewers.

New York Daily News compared the film to The Walking Dead, offering that it was more bloody and grisly, and that in comparison, Rise of the Zombies "makes Walking Dead look like Dora the Explorer." They also noted the film's "remarkably accomplished cast", and of the script wrote "their lines aren't Shakespeare, but they fall into the spirit, at least until most of them get chopped in half, eaten alive or whatever." Mike Hale of The New York Times felt that the film was "largely in the venerable horror tradition of movie-as-extended-chase-scene" and that The Walking Dead was "gentle by comparison." They wrote that the film had "credible action sequences" and that the script offered "tiny flashes of wit". James Luxford of The National called it "a B-Movie through and through" and said "The plot and script will appeal only to the most gore-hungry zombie fans."
