= Cloud Tectonics =

Play by José Rivera

Cloud Tectonics is a play by José Rivera, a dreamlike (and ultimately tragic) love story about its two protagonists, Aníbal de la Luna and Celestina del Sol. It is set in Los Angeles, California, with most of the action taking place in Aníbal's house. It is somewhat of the archetypal "boy meets girl" story.

Rivera studied screenwriting with Gabriel García Márquez at the Sundance Institute in 1989 and uses magical realism in the play by distorting audience conceptions of time, space and sound. He also uses poetic (and occasionally absurd) language to enhance the characters and the setting.

== Production history ==
The play premiered at the 19th Annual Humana Festival, in 1995, and was produced at the La Jolla Playhouse the same year and later at Playwrights Horizons in New York City.
