= TV 101 =

- Title screen
- Genre: Drama
- Created by: Karl Schaefer
- Directed by: Scott Brazil; Eric Laneuville; Sam Pillsbury; Beth Hillshafer; Ben Bolt; Jan Eliasberg; Bruce Seth Green; Win Phelps; John Heath; Sam Weisman
- Starring: Sam Robards; Brynn Thayer; Leon Russom; Andrew Cassese; Stacey Dash; Matt LeBlanc
- Composers: Todd Rundgren; Stacy Widelitz
- Country of origin: United States
- Original language: English
- No. of seasons: 1
- No. of episodes: 17 (4 unaired)

Production
- Executive producers: Scott Brazil; Karl Schaefer
- Producers: Michael Cassutt; James C. Hart
- Cinematography: Paul Goldsmith
- Editors: Augie Hess; Noel Rogers; M. Edward Salier
- Running time: 60 minutes
- Production company: GTG Entertainment

Original release
- Network: CBS
- Release: November 29, 1988 – March 25, 1989

TV 101 is an American drama television series that aired on CBS from November 29, 1988, until March 25, 1989. The series stars Sam Robards, Brynn Thayer, Leon Russom and Andrew Cassese. Other notable cast members include Stacey Dash, Teri Polo, Alex Désert and Matt LeBlanc. The music for this show was created and produced by Todd Rundgren.

== Synopsis ==
Recently divorced Kevin Keegan (Robards) is a photojournalist who quits his job and returns to alma mater, Roosevelt High School, to teach journalism. He then teaches his class how to produce a television news program instead of a traditional school newspaper.

=== Cancellation ===
The series was scheduled opposite ABC's top 10 hits Who's the Boss? and Roseanne, and NBC's top 20 hit, Matlock. After airing only 13 episodes of the 17 that were produced, TV 101 was canceled due to low ratings and a controversy that erupted when one of the show's characters became pregnant and decided to have an abortion.

== Cast ==
- Sam Robards as Kevin Keegan
- Brynn Thayer as Emilie Walker
- Leon Russom as Principal Edward Steadman
- Andrew Cassese as Sherman Fischer
- Stacey Dash as Monique
- Matt LeBlanc as Chuck Bender
- Alex Désert as Holden Hines
- Teri Polo as Amanda Hampton
- Stewart Goddard as Marty Voight
- Monique Salcido as Angela Hernandez
- Mary B. Ward as Penny Lipton
- Andrew White as Vance Checker
- Matt Dearborn as Skip the Janitor

== Episodes ==
No.	Title	Directed by	Written by	Original release date	U.S. viewers (millions)	Rating/share (households)
1	"Rolling"	Sam Weisman	Karl Schaefer	November 29, 1988	9.9	7.2/11
2	"Everything You've Always Wanted to Know About Teenagers a.k.a. But Were Afraid to Ask"	Beth Hillshafer	Karl Schaefer	December 6, 1988	8.4	6.0/9
3	"The Unbearable Rightness of Penny"	Eric Laneuville	Michael Cassutt	December 13, 1988	9.2	6.6/10
4	"Home"	Eric Laneuville	David Rothenberg	December 20, 1988	7.6	5.5/9
5	"On the Road"	Beth Hillshafer	Matt Dearborn	January 4, 1989	10.4	7.1/11
6	"Kangaroo Gate"	Ben Bolt	John Eisendrath & Kathryn Pratt	January 11, 1989	8.5	6.2/10
7	"The Last Temptation of Checker: Part 1"	Dan Lerner	Michael Cassutt	January 18, 1989	7.2	5.3/8
8	"The Last Temptation of Checker: Part 2"	Jan Eliasberg	Michael Cassutt	January 25, 1989	9.1	6.5/10
9	"Clicks"	Beth Hillshafer	Matt Dearborn	February 1, 1989	9.4	6.7/10
10	"First Love: Part 1"	Win Phelps	Story by : Pamela Douglas & Karen Croner; Teleplay by : Pamela Douglas & Racelle Friedman & Michael Cassutt	February 25, 1989	10.2	6.8/12
11	"First Love: Part 2"	Sam Pillsbury	Story by : Pamela Douglas & Karen Croner; Teleplay by : Pamela Douglas & Racelle Friedman & Michael Cassutt	March 4, 1989	9.7	6.1/10
12	"First Love: Part 3"	Bruce Seth Green	Story by : Karen Croner & Pamela Douglas; Teleplay by : Karen Croner	March 11, 1989	7.4	5.1/9
13	"Keegan's Past"	Scott Brazil	John Eisendrath & Kathryn Pratt	March 25, 1989	7.4	4.5/8
14	"Teacher of the Year"	Sam Pillsbury	Matt Dearborn	Unaired	N/A	N/A
15	"Modern, Steamy Romance"	Jeff Brown	Racelle Friedman	Unaired	N/A	N/A
16	"Bang, Zoom: Part 1"	John Heath	Karl Schaefer	Unaired	N/A	N/A
17	"Bang, Zoom: Part 2"	N/A	Michael Cassutt	Unaired	N/A	N/A
