= References to Salvador Dalí Make Me Hot =

References to Salvador Dalí Make Me Hot is a play by Puerto Rican playwright and screenwriter José Rivera. It won an Obie Award for writing in 2000.

== Background and conception ==
José Rivera was inspired by many events in his life to write References. His children brought home a stray kitten that they cared for. The neighborhood was riddled with coyotes, and he began to imagine the conversations that they might have. His own marriage was also in peril at the time, and he and his wife did in fact separate around the same time. The character of Benito was somewhat inspired by his younger brother Tony, who was a soldier in the Persian Gulf war stationed in Barstow, California where the play takes place.

In addition to this, Rivera had been heavily influenced by Colombian novelist Gabriel García Márquez, who brought magical realism into the mainstream. The works of Marquez and the paintings of the eponymous artist Salvador Dalí, specifically the piece Two Pieces of Bread Expressing Sentimental Love, were inspirations for the play, along with Pedro Calderon de la Barca's play La Vida Es Sueño ("Life Is a Dream"), which Rivera had recently translated and updated in his 1998 play Sueño.

== Production history ==
The play premiered at South Coast Repertory in Costa Mesa, California in 2000. Ana Ortiz played the role of Gabriela and Robert Montano took on both Benito and the Moon. Victor Mack, Svetlana Efremova and Wells Rosales filled out the cast as the Coyote, the Cat and Martin respectively.

It had its New York premiere in 2001 at The Public Theatre. Rosie Perez and John Ortiz played Gabriela and Benito. Michael Lombard, Kevin Jackson, Kristine Nielsen, Carlo Alban made up the rest of the cast. Other productions have included Bailiwick Arts Center in Chicago (2005) and Cara Mia in North Texas (2015).

== Plot ==
=== Act I ===
The play opens in Gabriela's backyard in Barstow, California, shortly after first Persian Gulf War. The moon watches from above while playing the violin. Gabriela's Cat enters and meets a Coyote in the yard. The two argue about who has a better life. The Coyote argues that he is wild and free living the hunter's life as opposed to the Cat's domesticated lifestyle. The Cat argues that she is loved and taken care of, which the Coyote cannot understand. The Coyote challenges her to spend one day in the wild and see the world as he sees it. The Cat, while possibly tempted, is suspicious that the Coyote wants to eat her. She questions him about the deaths of local cats, including a friend named Pinkie Garcia. The Coyote assures her that his hungers for her are of a more carnal nature. They kiss just as Gabriela enters with a gun, having heard their voices. The Cat assures Gabriela that there is no one else with her.

Gabriela feels alone and abandoned by her husband Benito, who is a soldier at war. Her friend the Moon comes down from the sky to comfort her. The Coyote is greatly pained by the approaching Moon, stating that coyotes howl at the Moon because the moonlight pains them. He is driven off and the Cat follows him. The Moon tells Gabriela that "from the tears of women civilizations are made." He alludes to many great men whose women were neglected. Gabriela thinks the Moon is trying to seduce her, which he doesn't deny. He references several famous artworks, which turns Gabriela on, and they share in a passionate kiss.

Martín, the fourteen-year-old neighbor boy, enters the scene. He is a peeping tom who is in love with Gabriela and envies the Moon. Gabriela and Martín speak a verse monologue simultaneously, Gabriela talking of her love for Benito and Martín of Gabriela. Martin and the Moon have a heated argument which ends in the Moon pointing Gabriela's gun at him. Martín passes out. Gabriela disapproves of the Moon's behavior and is angry with him. The dejected Moon returns to the sky, remarking on how he should just refrain from interfering with human life. Gabriela lies beside the dazed Martín and agrees to sleep with him- albeit in a non-sexual way. They fall asleep lying in the backyard.

=== Act II ===
Benito returns from the war, expecting a warm welcome from Gabriela. She simply asks if Benito saw the Moon that night. It is revealed that Gabriela and Benito have a tense and tumultuous marriage and they begin to argue. Benito is upset that they lack food in the house and that Gabriela won't have sex with him. In addition to this, Benito resents his sedentary desk job and the fact that Gabriela won't sympathize with him. Gabriela is preoccupied worrying about if the missing Cat was eaten by coyotes.

Benito passes out, exhausted. Martín enters with the Cat. He says that he found her surrounded by coyotes next to the remains of the slain Pinkie Garcia. He also implies that he believes the Cat had sex with the coyotes. He insists that he could take better care of Gabriela than Benito ever would and implores her to be with him. She sends him away, saying that he is too young. After he leaves Gabriela exposes her breasts to the sleeping Benito and breaks down crying.

=== Act III ===
Gabriela finds Benito crying out and howling in his sleep. Gabriela wakes him and he instinctively lunges at her. She dives away in time. This is an old habit that she has forgotten. Benito is upset about something but refuses to tell Gabriela. Gabriela threatens to go to her astronomy class, leaving Benito alone. He gives in and tells the story of how he was involved in an air strike, killing innocents, in revenge for a corporal's hand injury. Gabriela is disgusted and says she hates Benito's job. He wishes she would sympathize with him. She goes on to say that she studied Islam to better understand the people Benito kills. He changes the subject and attempts to seduce her through a game of asking about her childhood scars. This ends in them having passionate sex.

After the encounter Gabriela gets dressed and tells Benito that she is leaving him. She give him an ultimatum- choose the army or her. She says she wishes he could love the things that she loves, like theology and art. Benito only loves war and the army. She suggests that they leave that behind and go back to school. Benito argues that she and the army are his two great loves. He yearns for the old Gabriela who wanted babies. She reveals that she is infertile. She describes a dream in which she pulled rocks and shrapnel out of Benito's paralyzed body through his throat. She goes on to say that she feels all of the people he killed and deplorable acts he has committed. He is offended and leaves the house, leaving the choice up to her whether she will stay with him for his nine remaining years in the army before he can retire.

=== Act IV ===
Gabriela and Martín lie in the backyard, not touching. Martín is convinced that Gabriela took his virginity, though both she and the Moon deny it. Gabriela thinks back and wonders how her and Benito fell in love and if their love was ever real. The moon weakens as the morning comes and he departs, unable to offer advice. He no longer cares for clever references or art anymore.

Martín demands that Gabriela either come away with him and make a life together or give him his virginity back. She offers him the latter and kisses him passionately. She then rejects him. He reflects on the depth of his lust and the confusion of his pubescent age.

Gabriela recounts how she fell in love with Benito. They were running from some skinheads who had picked a fight with Benito. Despite the danger he still paused and took time to remark how beautiful the moon was. She recalls this as the moment she fell in love with him. She wonders if he still notices the moon- and if he is in fact still the man she loved.

As Benito returns, the Cat asks Gabriela what she should do now that her lover is dead. Gabriela responds "Fuck him anyway." The ghost of the Coyote appears to the Cat. She wants him desperately. He admits that had he gotten the chance he probably would have eaten her, as he was at heart a wild animal. He laments the loss of his sense of smell, and realizes that in the afterlife he can no longer hunt. The Cat and the Coyote wonder how long their love would last until it was tested like Gabriela's and Benito's. The two come together and dance throughout the final scene.

Gabriela confronts Benito and demands to know if he saw the Moon last night to see if he is still the man she fell in love with. The ending is left ambiguous, as we never hear his answer.

== Characters ==
- Moon: The Moon in the sky, Gabriela's friend.
- Coyote: A wild one.
- Cat: A fat one, Gabriela's pet.
- Martín: A Latino of fourteen, Gabriela's neighbor.
- Gabriela: A Latina of twenty-seven, an army housewife.
- Benito: A Latino, twenty-nine, Gabriela's husband, a soldier.

== Themes and interpretation ==
The play tackles themes of marriage, sexuality and war. Benito and Gabriela's relationship is in some ways mirrored by that of Cat and Coyote. Coyote is a hunter and wild where Benito is a soldier who has been involved in grisly acts of war, and Cat is a homebody, loved and taken care of with no knowledge of the stimulating and dangerous desert world in which Coyote lives where Gabriela is a housewife who is trapped in Barstow and fears the war. In addition to this, both the Cat and Gabriela refer to themselves as "fixed", as the Cat is spayed and Gabriela is infertile. It is unclear whether this puts a strain on both relationships. It is also possible that Gabriela's suggestion to the Cat to have sex with the Coyote's ghost harkens back to her sex scene with Benito. At the end, Coyote's ghost and Cat wonder how long they would last until their relationship too was tested, as their love was so sudden and unexplainable as was Gabriela's and Benito's.

Where Benito is in love with the war and the army, Gabriela is stimulated by knowledge and art. Her affair with the Moon may represent this, as she had been taking astronomy classes. She imagines the Moon referencing Shakespeare and Dali, which turns her on. She implies that she wishes Benito would be more like this and try to understand what she loves, but he demands that she love the army like him. This is a major source of tension in their marriage.

The play also touches on themes of manhood and puberty, as shown through the pubescent teenager Martín. He sees his manhood as defined by sex. To him, coming of age is having sex with Gabriela. Gabriela spurns him, as she believes that a relationship is more than that, leading to her questioning of Benito at the end of the play.

Some of the art referenced in the play includes Salvador Dalí's Two Pieces of Bread Expressing the Sentiment of Love and Shakespeare's Romeo and Juliet. Both reflect aspects of Gabriela and Benito's relationship, and the latter is quoted by the characters to show how the Moon is "inconstant" and cannot be a true friend to Gabriela.

== Style ==
The play makes heavy use of magical realism and references surrealist works. The first and the fourth acts exist in a more magical reality- in the published script of the play the dialogue in these acts is written in italics. The second and the third acts, which are mainly dialogue between Benito and Gabriela, are in a more realistic style and printed in normal text.

== Reception ==
The play has received mixed to positive reviews.

The Chicago Theatre Review called the script "brilliant" despite a lackluster production.

The New York Times found Rivera's diction awkward: “The occasionally fanciful language that Mr. Rivera occasionally puts in their mouths doesn't feel mystical, as intended; it feels out of place." A Younger Theatre gave the play a mixed review, calling it inaccessible to those unfamiliar with Salvador Dalí: "The references are only references, so anybody who isn't an avid fan will be lost."

== General references ==
- Jose Rivera, Testimonios II, Fundacion, 2004
- Pedro Calderon de la Barca, La Vida Es Sueno, Grant & Cutler, 1998
- David Savran, The playwright's voice: American dramatists on memory, writing, and the politics of culture, Theatre Communications Group, 1999
