= José Rivera (playwright) =

Puerto Rican playwright and screenwriter

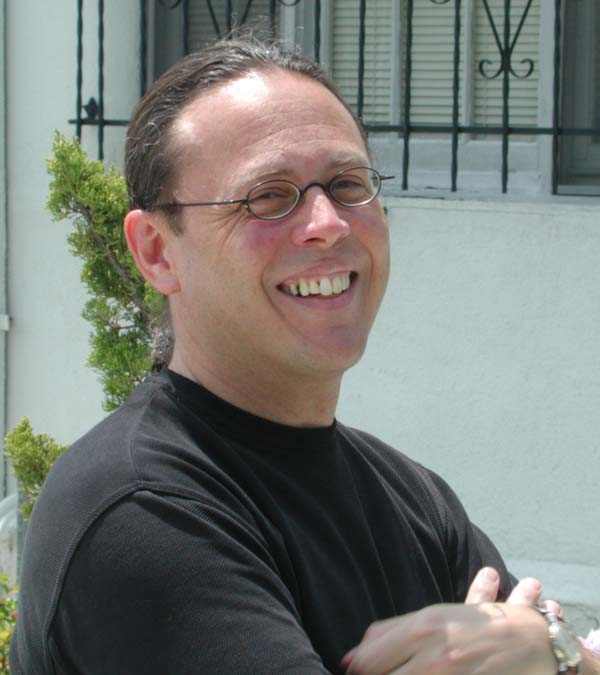
- Rivera in 2009
- Born: March 24, 1955 (age 71); San Juan, Puerto Rico
- Occupations: Screenwriter, playwright
- Writing career
- Period: 1983–present
- Notable works: Marisol; The Motorcycle Diaries Letters to Juliet; On the Road
- Notable awards: Obie Award, Goya Award, Academy Award (nom.)

José Rivera (born March 24, 1955) is a playwright and the first Puerto Rican screenwriter to be nominated for an Academy Award, for the movie The Motorcycle Diaries.

== Early years ==
Rivera was born in Santurce, San Juan, Puerto Rico, in 1955. He was raised in Arecibo until 1959, when his family moved to New York City, settling in Long Island. The small-town environment would later influence him. His father worked as a taxi driver, and Rivera recalls, "...for a long time I just wanted to do better than him...so for years I wanted to be a bus driver." His parents were very religious, and the only book in their household was the Bible. His family enjoyed telling stories and Rivera learned a great deal from the stories his family enjoyed sharing. As a child, he also enjoyed watching The Twilight Zone and The Outer Limits. He received his primary and secondary education in the New York state public school system. In 1968, when Rivera was 12 years old, he saw a traveling company perform the play "Rumpelstiltskin" at his school. Witnessing the collective reaction of the audience towards the play convinced the young Rivera that someday, he too, would aspire to write plays himself.

== Career ==
Many of Rivera's plays have been produced nationwide and translated into several languages, including The House of Ramon Iglesia, Cloud Tectonics, The Street of the Sun, Sonnets for an Old Century, Sueño, Giants Have Us in Their Books, References to Salvador Dalí Make Me Hot, and Adoration of the Old Woman. In 2003, Cloud Tectonics was presented at the XLII Festival of Puerto Rican Theater, an event sponsored by the Puerto Rican Institute of Culture, in San Juan. Rivera also co-founded the Los Angeles-based theater company, The Wilton Project.

His play "Brainpeople" premiered in San Francisco on January 30, 2008, and was co-produced by the American Conservatory Theater. Additionally, Rivera will direct and write the screenplay for "Celestina", a film loosely adapted from his play "Cloud Tectonics", which will be produced by Walter Salles. Among his recent projects is the movie adaptation of On the Road, based on the novel by Jack Kerouac.

=== Television ===
Rivera contributed as a writer to the following TV shows: ‘’a.k.a.Pablo’’ (1984), The House of Ramon Iglesia (1986), Family Matters, Goosebumps, The Jungle Book: Mowgli's Story (1998), Night Visions (2001) and the "Harmony" segment of Shadow Realm (2002). He also co-created and co-produced the NBC-TV series, Eerie, Indiana with Karl Schaefer.

=== TV appearances ===
Rivera has been featured in The Dialogue interview series. During a 90 minute interview with producer Mike DeLuca, Rivera described his transition from playwright to Oscar-nominated screenwriter.

=== The Motorcycle Diaries ===
In 2002, Rivera was hired to write the screenplay for the film Diarios de Motocicleta (The Motorcycle Diaries) by director Walter Salles. The movie, which was released in 2004, is based on Che Guevara's diary about a motorcycle trip which he and Alberto Granado had, and how it changed their lives. In January 2005, Rivera became the first Puerto Rican to be nominated for the Academy Award for Best Adapted Screenplay. His screenplay won awards from the Cinema Writers Circle (Spain) and from the Argentine Film Critics Association; it was also nominated for awards by the American Screenwriters Association, the Online Film Critics Society, and the Writers Guild of America.

This work with the subject of Che Guevara later led Rivera to write and perform a play entitled School of the Americas which focuses on Che's last few hours alive. The play starring John Ortiz as Che, imagines Che's final conversations, mainly with a young and fairly naïve female schoolteacher, in the one-room village schoolhouse where he is imprisoned before his execution. The play was featured in New York City 2006-2007 and later San Francisco 2008.

=== La Bamba remake ===
On August 26, 2024, it was announced that a remake of the 1987 movie La Bamba, which was based on the life and career of musician Ritchie Valens, was in the works with Rivera attached to write the script.

== Influences ==
In high school and later at Denison University, he immersed himself in the works of Shakespeare, Ibsen and Molière. His education centered on Anglo-Euro Cultures, leaving him with little exposure to the literature and writers of Latin America. However, he was profoundly influenced by the Latin American novel, One Hundred Years of Solitude by 1982 Nobel Prize winner Gabriel García Márquez, who later became his mentor at the Sundance Institute.

Rivera draws upon many of his life experiences in his plays. In The Promise and Each Day Dies With Sleep, he reflects on his experiences as a Puerto Rican in a small American town, highlighting themes of family, sexuality, spirituality and the occult. The play Marisol was inspired by the circumstances his homeless uncle.

== Awards and honors ==
Rivera has won two Obie Awards for playwriting, a Kennedy Center Fund for New American plays Grant, a Fulbright Arts Fellowship in playwriting, a Whiting Award, a McKnight Fellowship, the 2005 Norman Lear Writing Award, a 2005 Impact Award and a Berilla Kerr Playwriting Award.

== Plays ==
- The House of Ramon Iglesia (1983)
- The Promise (1988)
- Each Day Dies With Sleep (1990)
- Marisol (1992)
- Tape (1993)
- Flowers (1994)
- Giants Have Us In Their Books (1997)
- Cloud Tectonics (1995)
- Maricela De La Luz Lights The World
- Godstuff
- Adoration of the Old Woman
- The Street of the Sun (1996)
- Sueno (1998)
- Lovers of Long Red Hair (2000)
- References to Salvador Dalí Make Me Hot (2000)
- Sonnets for an Old Century (2000)
- School of the Americas (2006)
- Massacre (Sing To Your Children) (2007)
- Brainpeople (2008)
- Boleros for the Disinchanted (2008), world premiere Yale Repertory Theatre
- Human Emotional Process (2008), commissioned by McCarter Theatre
- Pablo and Andrew at the Altar of Words (2010)
- Golden (2010)
- The Kiss of the Spider Woman (translation) (2010)
- The Hours are Feminine (2011)
- Lessons for an Unaccustomed Bride (2011)
- The Book of Fishes (2011)
- Another Word for Beauty (2012), musical, music and lyrics by Héctor Buitrago, book by Rivera, production of The Civilians
- Written on my Face (2012)
- Another Word for Beauty (2013)
- The Last Book of Homer (2013)
- The Garden of Tears and Kisses (2014)
- Sermon for the Senses (2014)
- Charlotte (2014)
- The Untranslatable Secrets of Nikki Corona

Many of these plays are published by Broadway Play Publishing Inc.

== Bibliography of Scholarly Criticism ==
1. Toward a Rhetoric of Sociospatial Theatre: José Rivera's Marisol By: J. Chris Westgate, Theatre Journal, 2007 March; 59 (1): 21–37.
2. Split Personality: Random Thoughts on Writing for Theater and Film By: José Rivera, Cinema Journal, 2006 Winter; 45 (2): 89–92.
3. The Motorcycle Diaries By: Yon Motskin, Creative Screenwriting, 2005 January-Feb; 12 (1): 89.
4. 'An Urgent Voice for Our Times': An Interview with José Rivera By: Caridad Svich, Contemporary Theatre Review: An International Journal, 2004 November; 14 (4): 83–89.
5. Die Imaginierung ethnischer Weltsicht im neueren amerikanischen Drama By: Herbert Grabes, IN: Schlote and Zenzinger, New Beginnings in Twentieth-Century Theatre and Drama: Essays in Honour of Armin Geraths. Trier, Germany: Wissenschaftlicher; 2003. pp. 327–44
6. José Rivera By: Miriam Chirico, IN: Wheatley, Twentieth-Century American Dramatists, Third Series. Detroit, MI: Thomson Gale; 2002. pp. 281–301
7. Marisol, Angels, and Apocalyptic Migrations By: Jon D. Rossini, American Drama, 2001 Summer; 10 (2): 1-20.
8. An Interview with Jose Rivera By: Norma Jenckes, American Drama, 2001 Summer; 10 (2): 21–47.
9. Dream Editor By: Stephanie Coen, American Theatre, 1996 December; 13 (10): 26.
10. Exile and Otherness: Examples from Three Continents By: Phyllis Zatlin, Hispanofila, 1993 January; 107: 33–41.
11. Poverty and Magic in Each Day Dies with Sleep By: José Rivera, Studies in American Drama, 1945–present, 1992; 7 (1): 163–232.
12. An Interview with José Rivera By: Lynn Jacobson, Studies in American Drama, 1945–present, 1991; 6 (1): 49–58.

== See also ==
- List of Puerto Ricans
- On the Road (2012 film)
- List of Puerto Ricans in the Academy Awards
- List of Puerto Rican writers
- Puerto Rican literature
- Pacific Playwrights Festival
