= Ghosts of Fear Street (1998 film) =

- Directed by: Ken Kwapis
- Screenplay by: Karl Schaefer; R. L. Stine
- Based on: Ghosts of Fear Street by R. L. Stine
- Produced by: Kevin Donnelly; Karl Schaefer; Jane Stine; Joan Waricha
- Starring: Christopher Rich; Talia Balsam; Alexandra Breckenridge
- Edited by: Suzanne Pettit
- Music by: Mark Mothersbaugh
- Release date: July 31, 1998
- Running time: 22 minutes
- Country: United States
- Language: English

Ghosts of Fear Street is a 1998 film directed by Ken Kwapis, starring Christopher Rich, Talia Balsam, and Alexandra Breckenridge. The film is an adaptation of the novel of the same name by R. L. Stine.

== Plot ==
A horror writer visits his eccentric father-in-law, who lives on Fear Street, where weird things happen, with his family in his former neighborhood.

== Cast ==
- Christopher Rich as PJ Murphy
- Talia Balsam as Anne Murphy
- Vincent Berry as Joe Murphy
- Alexandra Breckenridge as Kit Murphy
- Azura Skye as Cricket
- Cameron Finley as Mickey
- Red Buttons as Grandpa
- Alan Wilder as Safety Czar
- Rick Overton as Fred the Bugman
- Phillip Van Dyke as Young PJ
- Stephen Allen Friedman as Young Fred

== Production ==
In 1997, Viacom Productions signed a development deal with Parachute Entertainment to produce a primetime TV series based on the Fear Street and Ghosts of Fear Street series of books for either the 1997-98 or 1998–99 television season to debut during mid-season. The pilot was first announced by ABC in 1997 and was pitched as a "frightcom" aimed at teenage audiences. It was directed by Ken Kwapis and written by Karl Schaefer.

Karl Schaefer was appointed as creator and executive producer on the series which would focus on a family living on Fear Street who encounter quirky things in their neighborhood. The series was slated to be a mixture of adapting the books as well as original material with the idea that scripts from the series could be published as books while the books would help fuel interest in the series. Soon after Disney-owned ABC bought a Fear Street pilot. In November of that year, Red Buttons joined the cast as Grandpa and the pilot was slated to start production on November 10 under the direction of Ken Kwapis. The pilot episode for the unproduced Fear Street television series, titled Ghosts of Fear Street, aired on ABC on July 31, 1998.

== Release ==
The pilot aired on July 31, 1998, on ABC, but the network did not produce any further episodes and the series was canceled. The pilot's airing held 89% of its men 18–34 lead-in but just 55% of its women 18–34 lead-in. The result was ABC's worst rating on record in that slot and a third-place finish for the night in homes and adults 18–49.
