= Eerie, Indiana =

American horror science fiction television series (1991–1993)

- The Complete Series DVD cover
- Genre: Horror; Mystery; Science fiction; Supernatural
- Created by: José Rivera; Karl Schaefer
- Starring: Omri Katz; Justin Shenkarow; Mary-Margaret Humes; Francis Guinan; Julie Condra; Jason Marsden
- Country of origin: United States
- Original language: English
- No. of seasons: 1
- No. of episodes: 19

Production
- Executive producers: John Cosgrove; Terry Dunn Meurer
- Cinematography: John Hora (pilot); Jonathan West
- Editors: Alan Baumgarten; Terry Blythe; Tom Meshelski; Jon Poll
- Camera setup: Single-camera
- Production companies: Unreality, Inc.; Cosgrove/Meurer Productions; Hearst Entertainment

Original release
- Network: NBC
- Release: September 15, 1991 – December 9, 1993

Related
- Eerie, Indiana: The Other Dimension

Eerie, Indiana is an American horror science fiction television series that originally aired on NBC from September 15, 1991, to December 9, 1993. The series was created by José Rivera and Karl Schaefer, with Joe Dante serving as creative consultant.

A total of nineteen episodes were produced. The final episode aired for the first time in 1993, when the series was syndicated on The Disney Channel. The show was rerun on The Disney Channel from October 7, 1993, to late March 1996. In 1997, the show generated a new fan base, when the Fox Kids Network aired the series on Saturday mornings from January to September, gaining something of a cult following despite its short run. The renewed popularity of the series encouraged Fox Kids to produce a spin-off Eerie, Indiana: The Other Dimension, lasting only one season in 1998.

== Overview ==
The series revolves around Marshall Teller, a teenager whose family moves to the desolate town of Eerie, Indiana, population of 16,661. While moving into his new home, he meets Simon Holmes, one of the few normal people in Eerie. Together, they are faced with bizarre scenarios, which include discovering a sinister group of intelligent dogs that are planning on taking over the world, and meeting a tornado hunter who is reminiscent of Captain Ahab. They also confront numerous urban legends such as Bigfoot and a still-living Elvis Presley. Although the show was host to a plethora of jokes, it also featured a serious tone.

After thirteen episodes, one of which did not air during the network run, the series was retooled with Jason Marsden's "Dash X" added to the cast, while Archie Hahn's Mr. Radford revealed to be an imposter, with John Astin revealed as the "actual" Mr. Radford. The final produced episode was a tongue-in-cheek, fourth-wall-breaking sequence of events depicting Dash X's attempts to take over as star of the show.

== Characters ==
=== Main ===
- Omri Katz as Marshall Teller
- Francis Guinan as Edgar Teller
- Mary-Margaret Humes as Marilyn Teller
- Julie Condra as Syndi Marie Priscilla Teller
- Justin Shenkarow as Simon Holmes
- Jason Marsden as Dash X

=== Recurring ===
- Mr. Radford (the imposter – revealed as Fred Suggs) – (Archie Hahn)
- Mr. Radford (the real one) – (John Astin)
- Winifred Swanson and Mother – (Belinda Balaski)
- Sergeant Knight – (Harry Goaz)
- Mayor Winston Chisel – (Gregory Itzin)
- The Anchorman – (Doug Llewelyn)
- Elvis Presley – (Steven Peri)
- Bertram Wilson – (Nathan Schultz & Dan Stanton)
- Ernest Wilson – (Nicholas Schultz & Don Stanton)
- Harley Schwarzenegger Holmes – (Christian and Joseph Cousins)
- Lodgepoole – (Henry Gibson)

== Production ==
Marketing the series proved to be difficult for NBC. Though its leads were children, writers Jose Rivera and Karl Scaefer intended for the show to be watched by a wider audience. NBC encouraged the production team to continue focusing on more mature elements, which led to a re-tooling of the show halfway through its run to focus on more serialized storytelling rather than its previously episodic approach. Joe Dante, fresh off the success of the Gremlins series, was brought on to direct several episodes, and the show was shot on film instead of tape. Despite these efforts, and perhaps due to the expense of the show, it was canceled after only 18 of its 19 episodes aired.

== Episodes ==
The show's producers planned to make an episode entitled "The Jolly Rogers", which featured a group of pirates in search for buried treasure in the Teller house.

No.	Title	Directed by	Written by	Original release date	Prod. code
1	"Forever Ware"	Joe Dante	José Rivera & Karl Schaefer	September 15, 1991	1001
Marshall's mother, Marilyn, meets a chipper neighbor woman named Betty and gets roped into buying Forever Ware, Tupperware-style plastic containers that keep food fresh -- and Marshall and Simon soon learn that this extends to human life when they meet Bertram and Ernest, Betty's sons who have been stuck as kids since 1964.
2	"The Retainer"	Joe Dante	José Rivera & Karl Schaefer	September 22, 1991	1002
Marshall's friend Steve dreads visiting the Eerie, Indiana orthodontist (Vincent Schiavelli) and is fitted for a retainer that gives him the power to read dogs' minds and uncover their plot to overthrow their human masters.
3	"The ATM with the Heart of Gold"	Sam Pillsbury	Matt Dearborn	September 29, 1991	1003
Simon, feeling left out with no friends but Marshall, comes across an ATM that gives him money to be more popular – which also causes Eerie, Indiana to sink into a financial depression and Marshall's father and his business partner to be accused of embezzlement.
4	"The Losers"	Joe Dante	S : Michael R. Perry; S/T : Gary Markowitz	October 6, 1991	1004
Marshall and Simon investigate a string of disappearances when Marshall's dad loses his briefcase.
5	"America's Scariest Home Video"	Sam Pillsbury	Karl Schaefer	October 20, 1991	1006
Stuck having to baby-sit Simon's younger brother on Halloween, Marshall and Simon fool around with their video camera, which leads to Simon's brother switching places with a mummy movie actor (Tony Jay).
6	"Just Say No Fun"	Bryan Spicer	Michael R. Perry	October 27, 1991	1008
Marshall suspects that the school nurse is using her eye exams to brainwash the student body (and principal) into becoming humorless zombies.
7	"Heart on a Chain"	Joe Dante	José Rivera	November 3, 1991	1007
Marshall and a classmate, Devon (Cory Danziger) fall for the new girl, Melanie Monroe (Danielle Harris), who has a heart condition. When Devon dies after getting run over by a car, Melanie gets her much-needed transplant and becomes a different person almost overnight. Now Marshall must find out if Melanie's personality change is from grief or Devon's soul possessing Melanie through the heart operation.
8	"The Dead Letter"	Tim Hunter	James L. Crite	November 10, 1991	1009
Marshall finds an old letter in the basement of the library -- and is haunted by a boy from the 1920s named Trip McConnell (Tobey Maguire) who won't leave until Marshall delivers the letter to his now-elderly sweetheart.
9	"Who's Who"	Tim Hunter	Julia Poll	November 17, 1991	1011
A young artist (Shanelle Workman) in a dysfunctional family of slovenly males begins to change her life for the better when she uses an Eerie brand pencil to draw her masterpieces — and ends up stealing Marshall's mother when she draws a picture of her and signs it.
10	"The Lost Hour"	Bob Balaban	Vance DeGeneres	December 1, 1991	1010
Marshall does not like the Indiana practice of ignoring Daylight Saving Time, and sets his clock back an hour anyway. When he wakes up the next day, he finds himself all alone in another dimension, save for an elderly milkman (Eric Christmas), a runaway teenage girl (Nikki Cox), and a group of garbage collectors who want the two of them dead.
11	"Marshall's Theory of Believability"	Bob Balaban	Matt Dearborn	February 2, 1992	1012
Nigel Zirchron (John Standing), a professor renowned as an authority on the supernatural, comes to Eerie to observe an extraterrestrial object he believes will land here. Marshall immediately sees an opportunity to blow the lid off the Eerie weirdness, but the professor may not really be all that he claims to be.
12	"Tornado Days"	Ken Kwapis	Michael Cassutt	March 1, 1992	1013
As the tornado "Old Bob" approaches Eerie, the citizens prepare for their annual tornado day picnic to appease him. But Marshall and Simon insist on staying home, and a tornado-chasing meteorologist, Howard Raymer (Matt Frewer) crash-lands on their front lawn, looking to take down Old Bob himself.
13	"The Hole in the Head Gang"^{*}	Joe Dante	Karl Schaefer	March 1, 1992	1014
Marshall and Simon investigate an old mill rumored to be haunted, only to discover that it is a hoax set up by a mysterious young man (Jason Marsden) who does not want anybody nosing around until they accidentally uncover a rusted gun, containing the ghost of Grungy Bill (Claude Akins), Eerie's worst (as in "most incompetent", not "most evil") bank robber.
14	"Mr. Chaney"	Mark Goldblatt	José Rivera	March 8, 1992	1015
Marshall is chosen to be the Eerie and Mr. Chaney (Stephen Root) as the "Harvest King" and must go face the Eerie wolf in the forest. The trouble is that none of the previous harvest kings have ever returned.
15	"No Brain, No Pain"	Greg Beeman	Matt Dearborn	March 15, 1992	1016
Marshall and Simon help out a homeless man (Paul Sand) after witnessing him being attacked by a woman (Anita Morris) with a ray gun, which proves difficult when all the homeless man can do is speak gibberish and build bizarre contraptions. Meanwhile, Dash X helps the mysterious woman find the homeless man.
16	"The Loyal Order of Corn"	Bryan Spicer	Michael Cassutt	March 22, 1992	1017
Marshall's father, Edgar joins a strange club called "The Loyal Order of Corn". Meanwhile, Dash X gets a job at the club and seeks answers about his past from the mysterious bartender (Ray Walston).
17	"Zombies in P.J.s"	Bob Balaban	Julia Poll	April 12, 1992	1018
Facing bankruptcy due to an IRS audit, Radford welcomes a new partner: a pompous businessman known as The Donald (René Auberjonois), who brainwashes the town into buying everything at The World O' Stuff during a midnight madness sale and is set on stealing their souls with an upcoming shopping spree at the mall.
18	"Reality Takes a Holiday"	Ken Kwapis	Vance DeGeneres	April 12, 1992	1019
In this self-referential episode, Marshall finds a television script in the mail and suddenly finds himself behind the scenes of Eerie, Indiana where his friends and family are the actors and actresses on the show, everyone refers to him as Omri Katz, and Marshall soon discovers that Dash X is going to kill off Marshall/Omri so he can take over the show/reality.
19	"The Broken Record"	Todd Holland	José Rivera	December 9, 1993	1005
Todd, Marshall's shy, nerdy friend with a verbally abusive father (Tom Everett), suddenly turns into a rebellious punk rocker after listening to one of Marshall's favorite records, but are the music's hidden messages really to blame or has the constant verbal abuse finally taken its toll on Todd? Meanwhile, Edgar and Marilyn worry about Syndi taking part in a police ride-along.

* "The Hole in the Head Gang" is the first episode in which the episode titles are shown on screen.

== Reception ==
Eerie, Indiana was well received by critics when it debuted on television. Entertainment Weekly gave it a "B" rating and Ken Tucker wrote "You watch Eerie for the small-screen spectacle of it all—to see the way, in the show's first few weeks, feature-film directors like Joe Dante (Gremlins) and Tim Hunter (River's Edge) oversaw episodes that summoned up an atmosphere of absurdist suburban dread."

In his review for The Hollywood Reporter, Miles Beller wrote "Scripted by Karl Schaefer and José Rivera with smart, sharp insights; slyly directed by feature film helmsman Joe Dante; and given edgy life by the show's winning cast, Eerie, Indiana shapes up as one of the fall season's standouts, a newcomer that has the fresh, bracing look of Edward Scissorhands and scores as a clever, wry presentation well worth watching." In his review for the Orange County Register, Ray Richmond wrote "It's the kind of knowingly hip series with equally strong appeal for both kids and adults, the kind that preteens will watch and discuss."

USA Today described the show as "Stephen King by way of The Simpsons", and Matt Roush wrote "Eerie recalls Edward Scissorhands and even—heaven help it—David Lynch in its garish nightmare-comedy depiction of the lurid and silly horrors that lurk beneath suburban conformity." In his review for The Washington Times, David Klinghoffer wrote "Everything about the pilot exceeds the normal minimal expectations of TV. Mr. Dante directs as if he were making a movie, and a good one. In a departure from usual TV operating procedures, he sometimes actually has more than one thing going on on screen at the same time!"

The New York Times and The A.V. Club noted the show is heavily inspired by elements from Twin Peaks and The Twilight Zone.

== Broadcast history ==
As of 2022, the series is available to stream on Amazon Freevee and Tubi.

== In other media ==
=== Books ===
Following its rebroadcast on Fox in 1997, Avon began publishing a series of paperback books based on the television series. They featured new stories with Marshall and Simon continuing to solve various perplexing phenomena in Eerie. Books in the series were written by authors Michael Thomas Ford, Sherry Shahan, Jeremy Roberts, John Peel and Robert James.

==== Titles ====
1. Return to Forever Ware (Mike Ford) (October 1997) ISBN 0-380-79774-7: Marshall and Simon get jobs cleaning a strange couple's basement out and discover that they were Forever Ware representatives and also used the infamous Tupperware to keep themselves young.
2. Bureau of Lost (John Peel) (October 1997) ISBN 0-380-79775-5: Eerie's Bureau of Lost suffers a power failure, and all of history's famous figures who went missing and/or died under mysterious circumstances (Jesse James, Butch Cassidy, The Sundance Kid, Amelia Earhart, among others) are on the loose and planning to commit crimes.
3. The Eerie Triangle (Mike Ford) (October 1997) ISBN 0-380-79776-3: Marshall and Simon try to solve the mystery of why Eerie, Indiana's town founder is not mentioned in the history books and if it has anything to do with a possible alien invasion cover-up in the 1950s.
4. Simon and Marshall's Excellent Adventure (John Peel) (November 1997) ISBN 0-380-79777-1: Simon and Marshall suspect a new boy, Jazen, who seems to disappear into thin air as he is about to be caught, of being a time traveler.
5. Have Yourself an Eerie Little Christmas (Mike Ford) (December 1997) ISBN 0-380-79781-X: Marshall and Simon find themselves in a Dickensian London town on Christmas Eve — and discover that they are trapped inside a snow globe and will remain so unless they can find a way out.
6. Fountain of Weird (Sherry Shahan) (January 1998) ISBN 0-380-79782-8: Marshall and Simon find themselves at the Old Fogey's Farm, run by Dr. Beelzebug, who uses the hormones of young people to keep his old clients youthful...and plans on using the boys for his experiments.
7. Attack of the Two-Ton Tomatoes (Mike Ford) (February 1998) ISBN 0-380-79783-6: Everyone in Eerie begins eating a new line of super-juicy, super-big vegetables to get healthy, but Marshall and Simon soon find that the produce is turning the people into plant monsters.
8. Who Framed Alice Prophet? (Mike Ford) (March 1998) ISBN 0-380-79784-4: A mysterious painting leads Marshall and Simon on the trail of an artist who makes her paintings too real.
9. Bring Me a Dream (Robert James) (March 1998) ISBN 0-380-79785-2: When anything the Tellers dream of is delivered to Marshall's door, it's fun at first—until the delivery van starts leaving nightmares.
10. Finger-Lickin' Strange (Jeremy Roberts) (May 1998) ISBN 0-380-79786-0: The new chef at World o' Stuff's lunch counter is a sensation: everybody raves about her cooking, but Marshall and Simon discover why the new chef's lunch leaves people wanting more.
11. The Dollhouse That Time Forgot (Mike Ford) (June 1998) ISBN 0-380-79787-9: Syndi and Mrs. Teller just love the old dollhouse they found at a yard sale, but Marshall and Simon aren't impressed. Still, when they see an interesting doll in a shop window, they make it a present for Syndi. But when Syndi puts the doll into the house, weirdness ensues. And when Marshall sneaks into a real-life house that looks like the dollhouse, he realizes that he's shrinking. What's the connection between all this and the peculiar new girl in school who looks just like Syndi's doll?
12. They Say (Mike Ford) (July 1998) ISBN 0-380-79788-7: Marshall and Simon help an old woman who tells them about The Gathering of They, a secret society behind the myriad of generalizations, advice, and superstitions in society.
13. Switching Channels (Mike Ford) (August 1998) ISBN 0-380-80103-5: In an adaptation of the series premiere of Eerie, Indiana: The New Dimension, two boys named Mitchell and Stanley find their television tuned into another dimension, where two boys named Marshall and Simon warn them that their reality is spilling into Mitchell and Stanley's reality.
14. The Incredible Shrinking Stanley (Robert James) (September 1998) ISBN 0-380-80104-3: Stanley and Mitchell go to the Eerie Laundromat after Stanley's washer breaks, but when Stanley comes in contact with the laundromat's soaps and powders, he begins to shrink, and unless Mitchell can fix it, Stanley will continue to grow small until he vanishes.
15. Halloweird (Mike Ford) (October 1998) ISBN 0-380-80105-1: Mitchell's dad is planning a special Halloween show on radio station WERD, a spooky story about invaders from Mars. Then Mitchell and Stanley find some terrific costumes at a local shop, and offer to help the proprietor organize a Halloween parade in return for letting them use the costumes for Halloween, unaware that they are about to get caught up in the weirdest adventure of all. Because some of the people in Eerie aren't really people—and Dad's radio show might just turn out to be true.
16. Eerie in the Mirror (by Robert James) (November 1998) ISBN 0-380-80106-X: Stanley and Mitchell accidentally break a mirror, but, rather than seven years' bad luck, the mirror creates an inverted reality of Eerie, Indiana. Can Mitchell and Stanley set things right without coming in contact with their inverted selves?
17. We Wish You an Eerie Christmas (Robert James) (December 1998) ISBN 0-380-80107-8: When the Tellers find themselves on the verge of losing their home, Mitchell's Christmas cheer turns sour, and only the Ghosts of Christmas Past, Present, and Not-So-Far-Into-The-Future can help him.

== Legacy ==
Alex Hirsch cited the series as an influence on his own Gravity Falls series.
