= Z Nation =

Post-apocalyptic horror series on Syfy

- Genre: Action; Horror; Comedy drama; Post-apocalyptic
- Created by: Karl Schaefer; Craig Engler
- Starring: Kellita Smith; DJ Qualls; Michael Welch; Keith Allan; Anastasia Baranova; Russell Hodgkinson; Pisay Pao; Nat Zang; Tom Everett Scott; Harold Perrineau; Matt Cedeño; Emilio Rivera; Joseph Gatt; Sydney Viengluang; Ramona Young; Natalie Jongjaroenlarp; Holden Goyette; Gracie Gillam; Henry Rollins; Tara Holt; Katy O'Brian; Mario Van Peebles; Lydia Hearst
- Composer: Jason Gallagher
- Country of origin: United States
- Original language: English
- No. of seasons: 5
- No. of episodes: 68 (list of episodes)

Production
- Executive producers: Paul Bales; David Michael Latt; David Rimawi; Karl Schaefer
- Producer: Karl Schaefer
- Production locations: Spokane, Washington; Eastern Washington; Fort Casey-Coupeville, Washington; Bremerton, Washington, Cheney Washington
- Cinematography: Alexander Yellen
- Editors: Anders Hoffmann; Fred Beahm; Erik C. Andersen
- Running time: 41–85 (Note: Although most of the episodes were around the 40 minute mark, the "flashback movie" called 'No Mercy' which took place in S3E1 was 85 minutes in length.) minutes
- Production companies: The Asylum; Go2 Digital Media; North By Northwest

Original release
- Network: Syfy
- Release: September 12, 2014 – December 28, 2018

Related
- Black Summer; Z Nation: Resurrection (forthcoming)

Z Nation is an American zombie apocalypse horror comedy-drama television series created by Karl Schaefer and Craig Engler that aired on Syfy from 2014 to 2018, and was produced by The Asylum. The first season of 13 episodes premiered on September 12, 2014. The series ran for five seasons and concluded on December 28, 2018. Z Nation was filmed in the Spokane, Washington area.

On June 16, 2016, Syfy announced that Z Nation's third season would be preceded by a TV movie, set prior to the climax of season 2 and introducing central characters for the third season. However, the movie was instead presented as the first two episodes of the third season, the two-part "No Mercy".

On December 15, 2017, Syfy renewed the series for a fifth season, which premiered on October 5, 2018. On December 22, 2018, Syfy cancelled the series after five seasons. The 68th and final episode aired on December 28, 2018, concluding the five-season series.

A more darkly-toned, less comedic prequel series with an entirely new cast titled Black Summer, showcasing the titular events at the start of the apocalypse referenced in the main series, subsequently ran for two seasons on Netflix between 2019 and 2021. Comparing the series, Schaefer noted that "Black Summer is before the apocalypse got weird and was just scary", and that the horror series is not intended to be the funny version of The Walking Dead that Z Nation is, but would instead be more of an "old-school" take on zombie lore.

In March 2024, The Asylum made a post on X (formerly known as Twitter) that fans interpreted as suggesting a sixth season of Z Nation might be in the works. However, this may have been a reference to the series returning to multiple streaming platforms. Additionally, in a social media post in August 2025 featuring a short animated video, lead actor Keith Allan pitched an animated sequel concept titled Z Nation: Reborn with the main cast returning to voice the characters, asking fans to sign a petition and demonstrate a demand for its development.

In October 2026, a sequel revival series to Z Nation was officially confirmed by The Asylum, titled Z Nation: Resurrection. The series is set to run for 10 episodes for its first season, following a new group of characters several years after the events of the original series, with original main cast members Kellita Smith (Warren), Keith Allan (Murphy), Russell Hodgkinson (Doc), and DJ Qualls (Citizen Z) in talks to reprise their characters in supporting roles.

== Premise ==
Z Nation begins three years into a zombie apocalypse caused by a virus that has already killed most humans. In the days just before society fell apart, Alvin Bernard Murphy was one of three inmates at Portsmouth Naval Prison in Kittery, Maine, who were participants in a government-approved experiment. Each inmate was given a different test vaccine, however Murphy was the only one to survive the vaccine injection. After the Prison falls to the zombies, the head of the experiment and her staff evacuate and leave Murphy behind. As such he is bitten multiple times and is the only known survivor of a zombie bite who did not turn into a zombie. His blood contains antibodies that are humankind's last and best hope for a vaccine. However, he seems to be mutating into some form of hybrid between zombie and human—his skin is shedding and his body turning blue, and he seems to be able to control and even mesmerize certain types of zombies that he encounters; yet he has not turned into a full zombie and still maintains control of himself.

The series revolves around his travels with a small group of survivors being led through the apocalypse by Lieutenant Roberta Warren and Simon "Citizen Z" Cruller, an NSA hacker with nearly unlimited radio and computer access. The group must transport Murphy from New York to the world's last known functioning Centers for Disease Control research lab in California. However, Murphy harbors a dark secret about his condition that threatens them all.

== Episodes ==
Season	Episodes	Originally released	
Season	Episodes	First released	Last released
1	13	September 12, 2014	December 5, 2014
2	15	September 11, 2015	December 18, 2015
3	14	September 16, 2016	December 16, 2016
4	13	September 29, 2017	December 15, 2017
5	13	October 5, 2018	December 28, 2018

== Cast and characters ==
- Kellita Smith as Lieutenant Roberta Warren.
  Lieutenant Warren is a survivor of the zombie apocalypse. An ex-National Guard member activated out of Missouri, she is a member of the Westward-bound survivor group, and a former member of the Blue Sky Camp survivor group in New York. Like many other survivors of the zombie apocalypse, Warren lost nearly everything and everyone that mattered to her. She becomes the leader of the survivor group after the death of Garnett. In season 4, she wakes up in Zona after being treated from being hit with a ricocheting bullet that passed through Murphy. After the chaos caused by the failing vaccine made from Murphy's blood among the Zona Citizens, she, along with Murphy, escapes and reunites with the group. In season 5, she becomes a talker after dying from blood loss after the drone she was trapped in crash-landed in the season 4 finale. However, unlike any of the talkers, she does not crave brains, presumably due to Murphy's blood in her system.
- DJ Qualls as Private First Class Simon "Citizen Z" Cruller
  Citizen Z, a former hacker, was working at the NSA's Northern Light listening post in the Arctic Circle. After a doomed rescue mission flight out of Northern Light, he becomes the facilities' sole surviving employee and uses his high-tech equipment to assist the group in its journey to California. He also runs a radio broadcast for other survivors, informing people to take cover when there is a threat of inescapable disaster-level weather or zombie hordes. He was slowly going insane from loneliness, until he rescued a sled dog named Pup which became his companion for the rest of the season. In the season 1 finale, Murphy triggered a security protocol which unleashed nuclear missiles targeted at every military base and laboratory in the country, including Camp Northern Light.
  At the end of season 2, Citizen Z decides to leave Northern Light when he realizes that the post's computer systems and equipment have sustained too much damage for him to repair alone. He leaves on foot with Pup, pulling a dog sled, in subzero temperatures. Near death, he is rescued by Kaya, an Inuk girl, and her surviving family members. They return to Camp Northern Light for the remaining resources, and repair the equipment making it operational again. He and Kaya form a relationship, which results in her becoming pregnant. He leaves in a plane and meets the survivor group in person to inform them that Lucy had been kidnapped by The Man, but later returns. He joins the team in Newmerica in season 5.
- Keith Allan as Alvin Bernard Murphy
  Alvin Murphy is a resentful and frail former convict who becomes the only known survivor of zombie bites after being part of a scientific experiment. The Westward-bound survivor group is tasked with transporting him to a government laboratory in California, as his apparent immunity is believed to be the sole solution to the ZN1 virus. Over time, Murphy's appearance changes, and he becomes part-zombie. He can communicate with zombies, develops feelings for them and can make them do his bidding. He also develops a special gift: after biting a person or exposing them to his saliva or blood, he can direct them using telepathy. In season 3, after finding out the survivors at Zona want to use him only for themselves, he escapes after biting Dr. Merch and several military personnel, as well as 10K and decides to make the human race into zombie-human hybrids (known as the "Blends") which is under his control. In season 4, he is cured at Zona but loses his special abilities. He later regains his abilities when he was bitten by Lucy to save his life after being bitten by a zombie. In the series finale, he finally learns the cure for the zombie virus after eating Sun Mei's brain, but leaves it ambiguous if he'll use it for good or not.
- Russell Hodgkinson as Steven "Doc" Beck
  Doc was a wellness counselor and recovering drug addict pre-apocalypse. Prior to becoming a counselor, he served in the United States Navy and was stationed in the U.S. Naval Base Subic Bay. Although not an actual medical doctor, he becomes the group's de facto medic due to his medical knowledge, which he acquired from watching ER. With his limited knowledge, he is able to treat the injured members of the group and other survivors that they meet along the way. He is a former member of the Blue Sky Camp in New York, along with Warren, Addy, and Mack. He is often the group's life of the party with his seemingly never-ending humor and optimal attitude and has been known to partake in recreational drugs, mainly marijuana. He forms an attachment with 10K as a father figure, recounting his guilt over not being a supportive father over an unrecognized son that he had when he was 19. He is also the first among the Westward-bound survivor group to befriend Murphy. He aids Serena when she gives birth to Lucy in season 2. In season 3, Doc revealed that he has a PhD in Clinical Psychology, and was able to help the surviving patients confined in a psychiatric hospital.
- Nat Zang as Thomas "10K"
  10K, often called "The Kid" by Doc, is the youngest member of the Westward-bound survivor group. In the season 1 finale, his real name was revealed to be "Tommy". 10K is quiet and observant. He is highly proficient with a sniper rifle and other projectiles, and is "pretty good with a knife". He loves killing zombies, and keeps track of each one he kills. His goal is 10,000 kills, hence his self-given nickname, and he has already reached 1,000 by his first appearance.
  His backstory reveals that 10K was forced to kill his father, making a promise to him that he would stay strong and fight. 10K harbors feelings of anger and hatred towards Murphy for turning Cassandra into a zombie-human hybrid, but does not act on those feelings, knowing that Murphy could be humanity's only chance to survive. In the season 2 finale, he is injured and taken with Murphy to the CDC submarine to be given medical attention for his wound. He escapes the submarine with Murphy, Dr. Merch and the others bitten by Murphy, and is openly opposed to following him. He is told by Dr. Merch that he was bitten after she gave him his first dose of the original cure. He stops counting during season 3, but resumes during season 4. In season 4, he is out of Murphy's control, grows a beard and lives in a tent on the top of a big tree with Red. In season 5, his right hand is bitten by zombies and Red cuts it off. His hand is then replaced with a deer antler.
- Anastasia Baranova as Addison Grace "Addy" Carver
  Addy Carver is a former member of the Blue Sky camp in New York and is Mack's girlfriend prior to his death. She is the survivor group's communication specialist and uses her talents with radio equipment to contact Citizen Z. Broken by unresolved trauma, she is slowly being worn down by the apocalypse. At one point, she chooses to leave the group and join the Sisters of Mercy camp, but after the camp is destroyed, she reunites with Mack, who refused to leave her behind, and returns to the Westward-bound survivor group. Her weapon of choice against zombies is a customized metal bat with spikes known as the "Z-Whacker"; in season 3, her bat is upgraded by Sun Mei and her team to emit an electric charge similar to a taser. Between seasons 3 and 4, she loses her right eye after fighting The Man in the season 3 finale. It was later revealed that she became a Blend when Lucy bit her in order to save her life after falling from a cliff in the Zona base, thus sharing a telepathic bond with Lucy. She disappears early in season 4 but returns in season 5 to assist the team.
- Michael Welch as Mack Thompson (seasons 1–2)
  A former hockey player for the Tri-City Americans, Mack Thompson is a survivor of the zombie apocalypse, and Addy's boyfriend. He is a former member of the Blue Sky camp in New York, and a member of the Westward-bound survivor group. A good shot, Mack protects Addy and stays behind when she chose to join the Sisters of Mercy camp, and watches over her from afar. He is eventually reunited with Addy and returns to the survivor group. He is killed ("mercied") by Addy while being devoured by zombies.
- Pisay Pao as Cassandra (seasons 1–2, guest season 3)
  Cassandra is a survivor of the initial zombie apocalypse. She is a former member of the Philadelphia cannibal survivor group, where she served as a "lure" to attract male survivors with the promise of sexual trade, in order for the group to trap and consume them. Cassandra joins the Westward-bound survivor group after being found in a locked cage at a rendezvous station near Philadelphia. A leg injury leads to an infection. Lacking antibiotics and near death, she is bitten by Murphy and becomes a zombie-human hybrid controlled by Murphy. She becomes the first person to become a Blend. She eventually attacks the group after Murphy orders her to prevent anyone from leaving the campsite and following him which caused 10K to kill ("mercy") her.
- Tom Everett Scott as Sergeant Charles Garnett (season 1)
  Sergeant Garnett was with the National Guard, based out of Georgia, prior to the ZN1 outbreak. He is a former member of the Blue Sky Camp in New York before taking on the task of transporting Murphy. He is the leader of the Westward-bound survivor group until his demise. Trying to protect Murphy, he is murdered and turned into a zombie by Priest Jacob and his Resurrection Cult. He is mercied by Warren, his second-in-command, and at that point, his girlfriend.
- Harold Perrineau as Lieutenant Mark Hammond (season 1)
  Lieutenant Hammond is the last surviving member of the Delta Force team transferring Murphy to a laboratory in California. He is mercied by the Westward-bound survival group after being bitten. Despite being credited as a main cast member, Perrineau only appeared in the first episode.
- Matt Cedeño as Javier Vasquez (season 2, guest season 3)
  Javier Vasquez is first encountered in the opening episode of season 2, "The Murphy". Vasquez was a DEA agent, but after he arrested some of Escorpion's men, Escorpion abducted his wife and daughter, later killing them in front of him. His wife and daughter turned into zombies during their funeral, and Vasquez seeks revenge on Escorpion. He tries to assassinate Escorpion during the group's Zeros induction ceremony, but is stopped by Warren and tortured by the Zeros before escaping. At the conclusion of season 2, he leaves the main survivor group. In the season 3 episode "Heart of Darkness", Vasquez reappears, having assumed the mantle of "Escorpion" after suffering a mental breakdown, and is later mercied by Warren.
- Emilio Rivera as Hector "Escorpion" Alvarez (seasons 2–3)
  Escorpion is the main antagonist of season 2, first encountered in the second episode, "White Light". He served as the right-hand of La Reina, the head of a Mexican drug cartel known as the Zeros. He has a small Z-shaped scar on his right hand and a tattoo of a face in his forearm. Pre-apocalypse, he was a soldier in the same drug cartel and was the one who tortured Vasquez and killed his wife and daughter. Escorpion's weapon of choice is a golden gun. At the end of season 2, he has reformed, aiding the group from La Reina and his men's attack. He then asked forgiveness from Vasques and allows him to take his life to avenge his family, but Vasquez spares his life, and later joins the main survivor group. In season 3, he is killed by Vasquez, who has assumed his former identity. He was injected with an experimental vaccine made by Sun Mei which at first had no effect. He later reawakens with his eyes having changed which was caused by the vaccine. It is unclear what other effects the vaccine had on him, as he does not appear again.
- Joseph Gatt as The Man (season 3)
  The Man first appears in the first episode of season 3, "No Mercy". Following a list created by his Zona employer, it is his job to collect people by any means necessary and ship them to Zona. He is ruthless and will take out anyone in his way. He is known to have completely decimated at least two survivor communities to obtain the people on his list. He has a perfect success rate and has yet to lose a target. As of the second episode of season 3, "A New Mission", The Man's current list contains only one name: "Alvin Bernard Murphy". He was later killed by Addy when both fall from a cliff in the Zona base in order to prevent Lucy from being captured by the Zona forces.
- Sydney Viengluang as Sun Mei (season 3–5)
  Sun Mei is first encountered in the second episode of season 3, "A New Mission". She is a Laotian virologist from Beijing, China, where 200,000 survived the zombie apocalypse by sealing themselves behind the walls of the Forbidden City. She is sent with a team and equipment from China to collect DNA samples from the American survivor group and Murphy in the hope of synthesizing a cure. She is the sole survivor of her team's mission and for now, has joined the survivor group. She eventually discovers the cure to the ZN1 virus which would revert the talkers, as well as the newly-turned zombies.
- Ramona Young as Kaya (season 3–5)
  Kaya is first encountered in the second episode of season 3, "A New Mission". Kaya is an Inuk girl living with her Uncle Koska and her Nana; they are the sole survivors of their village. She finds Citizen Z and Pup out in a blizzard, rescues them, and takes them to her home. She reveals to Citizen Z that she is a huge fan of his, telling him he needs to get healthy and start broadcasting again. They eventually form a relationship after they return to Camp Northern Light, and she becomes pregnant with their son, JZ. She becomes a part of the team in season 5.
- Natalie Jongjaroenlarp as "Red" (season 3–5)
  A survivor from the Mercy Labs Survivor camp, guardian of 5K and love interest of 10K.
- Holden Goyette as "Nature Boy" / "5K" (season 3, guest season 4)
  A survivor from the Mercy Labs Survivor camp, and Red's adoptive brother. He was raised by a murder of crows before being found by Red. He was nicknamed 5K due to his resemblance and attachment to 10K and his skill with 10K's slingshot. He falls off a cliff when he pursues Addy, Lucy and The Man in the season 3 finale. Red hopes he is still alive somewhere, while 10K believes he is dead.
- Tara Holt as Lucy Murphy (season 4, guest seasons 2–3)
  The daughter of Murphy and Serena. In season 2, she is a baby, but ages rapidly when she gets excited due to the virus she acquired from her father. In season 3, she ages from someone who looks 5 years old, to a preteen, to a teenager (and is thus portrayed by multiple actresses). In season 3, she looks like a young adult, and is portrayed by Tara Holt. She is kidnapped by The Man, who tries to bring her to Zona in her father's place, but this is impeded by Addy, with whom she forms a close bond, even referring to her as "Aunt Addy". She sacrifices her life to save her father from succumbing to the virus after being bitten.
- Grace Phipps as Sergeant Lilly Mueller (seasons 4–5)
  Lieutenant Mueller's daughter, who assists him in running a refugee camp trying to get survivors to Newmerica. After her father's death, she joins the main survivor group. She begins a relationship with 10K at the end of season 4 after Red has gone missing. In season 5, 10K meets up with Red again, and when both of them and Sarge are cornered by zombies, Sarge sacrifices herself to save 10K and Red, allowing herself to be bitten before setting off a grenade that blows her and the zombies up.
- Henry Rollins as Lieutenant Mueller (season 4)
  Sergeant Lilly's father, who runs a refugee camp trying to get survivors to Newmerica. He is killed by zombies and mercied by his daughter.
- Katy O'Brian as Georgia "George" St. Clair (season 5)
  A survivor-turned-political-leader of Newmerica and an old friend of Warren who saved her during a zombie outbreak at her university.
- Mario Van Peebles as Martin Cooper (season 5)
  A farmer who was trained as a medic pre-apocalypse.
- Lydia Hearst as Pandora (season 5)
  A zombie "talker" who is a resident of Newmerica, who may be plotting a coup against George.

== Production ==
Z Nation is produced by Go2 Digital Media for The Asylum. On June 29, 2014, it was announced that the filming of 13 episodes for the first season of the series was underway. On October 12, 2014, Syfy announced that it had ordered a second season of Z Nation. Schaefer and Engler have described Z Nation as an attempt to "put the fun back into zombies", criticizing shows like The Walking Dead for being too serious. Z Nation's first season had a budget of less than $700,000 per episode.

== Release ==
=== Broadcast ===
Z Nation was distributed internationally by Dynamic Television. The series premiered on Syfy in Australia on April 1, 2015, and was watched by 26,000 viewers. The United Kingdom premiere aired on Freeview channel Pick on July 21, 2015.

=== Home media ===
Season 1 was released on DVD on February 10, 2015, by Syfy in association with Universal Home Entertainment. It was also issued on iTunes, with episodes running approximately 41–43 minutes each. The following seasons were all released to Amazon in DVD form, with Season 2 on March 1, 2016, Season 3 on March 14, 2017, Season 4 on January 22, 2018, and Season 5 on January 21, 2019.

Netflix acquired the worldwide distribution rights in 2015 with all 5 seasons available until the shows removal; On January 27, 2023 for Netflix US, November 20, 2024 for Netflix UK, and January 31, 2025 for Netflix Japan.

== Reception ==
The first season of Z Nation received mixed reviews from professional television critics. Its aggregate score on Metacritic is 48 out of 100 based on reviews from 11 critics. Rotten Tomatoes gave the show a rating of 45%, based on reviews from 20 critics, with the site's consensus stating "Although it's hampered by an overcrowded narrative, Z Nation manages to muster up some fun scares without taking itself too seriously."

Chris Carabott of IGN noted that the show "continues to set itself apart in campy and inventive ways." Brian Moylan of The Guardian called Z Nation scary "in the same vague way as that talking green blob is in the Mucinex commercials" and concluded that viewers would hate all the characters, but that "Citizen Z (DJ Qualls) is especially horrible." Merrill Barr of Forbes magazine said the show had a high entertainment value.

In its first season, Z Nation averaged 1.42 million viewers per episode, including a .48 rating in the 18- to 49-year-old demographic.

== Connection to other films ==
=== Sharknado films ===
The film Sharknado 3: Oh Hell No!, released in July 2015, featured a cameo appearance by Smith as Sgt. Warren. In a first-season episode of Z Nation, "Home Sweet Zombie" (2014), upon viewing a tornado carrying and tossing zombies, Warren remarks, "They ain't sharks!"

Additionally, the 2017 film Sharknado 5: Global Swarming featured a cameo appearance by Hodgkinson as Doc.

== Spin-off ==
=== Companion prequel series ===
On July 19, 2018, it was reported that Netflix had given an eight-episode straight-to-series order for Black Summer, a prequel series set within the Z Nation universe. Actress Jaime King was set to star in the series, created by Schaefer and John Hyams. At the 2018 San Diego Comic-Con, Schaefer noted that "Black Summer is before the apocalypse got weird and was just scary." He also said that the drama series is not intended to be the funny version of The Walking Dead that Z Nation is, but instead would be a more traditional take on zombie lore. In November 2019, Netflix renewed the series for a second eight-episode season, set simultaneously with the first season of Z Nation.

In April 2023, it was confirmed that Black Summer was cancelled and will not return for a third season.

== Revival ==
On March 12, 2024, the official X (formerly known as Twitter) account for The Asylum made a post regarding the show: "Sorry folks. We took a brief break. But now that we're back... #ZNation", along with a poster that stated that there would be a major announcement "soon." It is unclear whether a possible return of Z Nation would be a continuation of the plot of the fifth season, or a full reboot of the series. However, this may have been a reference to the series returning to multiple streaming platforms. Additionally, in a social media post in August 2025 featuring a short animated video, lead actor Keith Allan pitched an animated sequel concept titled Z Nation: Reborn with the main cast returning to voice the characters, asking fans to sign a petition and demonstrate a demand for its development.

In October 2026, a sequel revival series to Z Nation was officially confirmed by The Asylum, titled Z Nation: Resurrection. The series is set to run for 10 episodes for its first season, following a new group of characters several years after the events of the original series, with original main cast members Kellita Smith (Warren), Keith Allan (Murphy), Russell Hodgkinson (Doc), and DJ Qualls (Citizen Z) in talks to reprise their characters in supporting roles.
