= Karl Schaefer =

American television producer

- Born: Los Angeles, California, U.S.
- Occupations: Television producer and writer
- Years active: 1988–present

Karl Schaefer is an American television producer and writer.

He is best known for co-creating the 1990s series Eerie, Indiana with José Rivera. Prior to working on Eerie, Indiana. Schaefer created the series TV 101. His other television credits include Strange Luck, Monk, Small Shots, The Dead Zone, Eureka, Ghost Whisperer and the television film The Apartment Complex (1999), directed by Tobe Hooper. He was an Executive Producer and Showrunner for Z Nation, a zombie series that he co-created with Craig Engler, and its prequel spin-off, Black Summer.

Schaefer is also the CEO of Unreality Inc, an Intellectual Property Creator.

== Filmography ==
=== Television ===
The numbers in directing and writing credits refer to the number of episodes.

Title	Year	Credited as				Network	Notes
Title	Year	Creator	Director	Writer	Executive Producer	Network	Notes
TV 101	1988–89	Yes	No	Yes (3)	Yes	CBS	
Eerie, Indiana	1991–92	Yes	No	Yes (4)	Yes	NBC	
Strange Luck	1995–96	Yes	No	Yes (2)	Yes	Fox	Executive producer (13 episodes)
Eerie, Indiana: The Other Dimension	1998	No	No	Yes (1)	No	Fox Kids Network	
Ghosts of Fear Street	1998	Yes	No	No	Yes	ABC	Pilot episode
The Apartment Complex	1999	—N/a	No	Yes	Yes	Showtime Networks	Television film
Small Shots	2001	No	Yes	No	Yes	The New TNN	
The Dead Zone	2003–06	No	Yes (1)	Yes (8)	No	USA Network	Co-executive producer (season 2: 4 episodes); Executive producer (season 3: 11 episodes; season 4: 2 episodes); Executive consultant (season 4: 8 episodes; season 5: 2 episodes)
Monk	2003	No	No	Yes (1)	No	USA Network	
Eureka	2006	No	No	Yes (2)	No	Sci Fi	Co-executive producer (season 1: 11 episodes)
Ghost Whisperer	2007–08	No	No	Yes (2)	No	CBS	Consulting producer (season 3: 13 episodes)
Z Nation	2014–18	Yes	No	Yes (11)	Yes	Syfy	
Black Summer	2019–2021	Yes	No	Yes (4)	Yes	Netflix	
