= Ilona =

- Gender: Female
- Language: Hungarian, Finnish, Estonian, Latvian, Lithuanian, Polish, German, Czech

Origin
- Origin: Greek (Helenē), via Slavic (Jelena)
- Meaning: "shining", "joy"

Other names
- Nicknames: Ilonka, Ilike, Ica, Illy, Lo, Ilka
- Derived: Traditional name of the Queen of the Fairies in Hungarian folklore
- Related names: Helena, Helen, Elena, Jelena, Ileana, Ilana

Ilona is a feminine given name used primarily in Hungary and Finland, as well as in other parts of Central and Eastern Europe.

The name Ilona is the Hungarian form of the Greek name Helenē (Ἑλένη), which is commonly interpreted to mean “torch,” “light,” or “shining one.” The name likely entered Hungarian through Slavic intermediaries such as Jelena.

In Hungarian folklore, Ilona is also known as the name of the Queen of the Fairies, a mythical figure associated with beauty, magic, and enchantment.

In Finland, Ilona is commonly associated with the Finnish word ilo, meaning “joy.” In this context, ilona can be understood as “as a joy [to someone],” though this interpretation is a folk etymology and not linguistically related to the Greek origin.

== People ==
- Archduchess Ilona of Austria (1927–2011)
- Ilona Ács (1920–1976), Hungarian freestyle swimmer
- Ilona Aczél (1884–1940), Hungarian actress
- Ilona Andrássy (1858–1952), Hungarian noblewoman
- Ilona Andrews, joint pen name of American novelist duo Ilona and Andrew Gordon
- Ilona Banga (1906–1998), Hungarian biochemist
- Ilona Bata (born 1955), Hungarian rower
- Ilona Békési (born 1953), Hungarian artistic gymnast
- Ilona Bell, American academic
- Ilona Berecz (born 1947), Hungarian ice dancing coach and former competitor
- Ilona Béres (born 1942), Hungarian actress
- Ilona Biacsi (born 1985), Hungarian Paralympic athlete
- Ilona Borsai (1924–1982), Hungarian musicologist, folk music historian
- Ilona Brand (born 1958), German luger
- Ilona Breģe (born 1959), Latvian composer
- Ilona Bruzsenyák (born 1950), Hungarian athletics competitor
- Ilona Bublová (born 1977), Czech cross-country skier
- Ilona Burgrová (born 1984), Czech basketball player
- Ilona Csáková (born 1970), Czech pop singer
- Ilona Csepreghyné-Meznerics (1906–1977), Hungarian stratigrapher and invertebrate paleontologist
- Ilona Dajbukát (1892–1976), Hungarian actress
- Ilona Dávid (born 1972), Hungarian economist
- Ilona DeVito di Porriasa (1939–2013), Hungarian-born countess
- Ilona Duczyńska (1897–1978), Polish Hungarian Canadian revolutionary, journalist, translator, engineer and historian
- Ilona Durigo (1881–1943), Hungarian classical contralto
- Ilona Dzelme (born 1966), Latvian windsurfer
- Ilona Edelsheim-Gyulai (1918–2013), Hungarian noblewoman
- Ilona Eibenschütz (1872–1967), Hungarian pianist
- Ilona Ékes, Hungarian politician
- Ilona Elek (1907–1988), Hungarian world and Olympic champion saber fencer
- Ilona Fehér (1901–1988), Hungarian violinist and teacher
- Ilona Felicjańska (born 1970), Polish model
- Ilona Georgiana Ghioroaie (born 1998), Romanian tennis player
- Ilona Gófitz, Hungarian conjoined twin
- Ilona Graenitz (1943–2022), Austrian MP and MEP
- Ilona Granet, American artist
- Ilona Gusenbauer (born 1947), Austrian high jumper
- Ilona Harima (1911–1986), Finnish artist
- Ilona Hegedűs, Hungarian writer
- Ilona Hlaváčková (born 1977), Czech swimmer
- Ilona Hoeksma (born 1991), Dutch cyclist
- Ilona Hubay (1902–1982), Hungarian incunabula specialist
- Ilona Jokinen (born 1981), Finnish opera singer
- Ilona Jurševska (born 1970), Latvian politician
- Ilona Kabos (1893–1973), Hungarian-British pianist
- Ilona Karmel (1925–2000), American writer
- Ilona Kassai (1928–2025), Hungarian actress
- Ilona Katliarenka (born 1993), Belarusian synchronized swimmer
- Ilona Kerekes (1926–2023), Hungarian table tennis player
- Ilona Keserü (born 1933), Hungarian artist
- Ilona Khubaeva, South Ossetian politician
- Ilona Kickbusch (born 1948), German scientist
- Ilona Király, Hungarian table tennis player
- Ilona Kökény (1891–1947), Hungarian actress
- Ilona Kolonits (1922–2002), Hungarian film director and news correspondent
- Ilona Korstin (born 1980), Russian basketball player
- Ilona Koutny (born 1953), Hungarian linguist and Esperantist
- Ilona Kovács (born 1960), Hungarian basketball player
- Ilona Kremen (born 1994), Belarusian tennis player
- Ilona Kronstein (1897–1948), Hungarian artist
- Ilona Kurdy (1951–2007), Hungarian painter and sculptor
- Ilona Lagas (born 1956), Dutch politician
- Ilona Lőrincz (born 1955), Hungarian basketball player
- Ilona Lucassen (born 1997), Dutch judoka
- Ilona Madary (1916–2003), Hungarian rhythmic gymnast
- Ilona Mądra (born 1966), Polish basketball player
- Ilona Maher (born 1996), American rugby player, 2020 Olympian with the USA Eagles Women's Rugby 7s squad
- Ilona Makláry-Buzek (born 1945), Hungarian volleyball player
- Ilona Marhele (born 1986), Latvian long-distance runner
- Ilona Marita Lorenz (1939–2019), German woman who had an affair with Fidel Castro and betrayed a CIA assassination attempt against him
- Ilona Markova (born 2002), Russian ice hockey player
- Ilona Massey (1910–1974), Hungarian actress
- Ilona Masson (born 2001), Belgian athlete
- Ilona Melnichenko, Soviet figure skater
- Ilona Mihályka, Hungarian handball player
- Ilona Mitrecey (born 1993), French singer
- Ilona Mokronowska (born 1972), Polish rower
- Ilona Mononen (born 2003), Finnish athlete
- Ilona Murai Kerman (1923 or 1924–2020), American dancer
- Ilona Náday (1874–1949), Hungarian singer and actress
- Ilona Nagy (born 1951), Hungarian handball player
- Ilona Novák (1925–2019), Hungarian swimmer
- Ilona Ostrowska (born 1974), Polish actress
- Ilona Otto (born 1979), German voice actress
- Ilona M. Otto, climate change scientist
- Ilona Pál (born 1954), Hungarian sprinter
- Ilona Palásti (1924–1991), Hungarian mathematician
- Ilona Poljakova (born 1973), Estonian tennis player
- Ilona Prokopevniuk (born 1997), Ukrainian freestyle swimmer
- Ilona Prunyi (born 1941), Hungarian music educator
- Ilona Richter (born 1953), German rower
- Ilona Riipinen (born 1982), Finnish physicist
- Ilona Rodgers (born 1942), English actress
- Ilona Rolfes (born 1973), German microwave engineer
- Ilona Royce Smithkin (1920–2021), American artist, author, model and performer
- Ilona Ruotsalainen (born 1981), Finnish snowboarder
- Ilona Sasváriné Paulik (1954–1999), Hungarian para table tennis player
- Ilona Sekacz (born 1948), British composer
- Ilona Semkiv (born 1994), Ukrainian freestyle swimmer
- Ilona Senderek (born 1988), Polish figure skater
- Ilona Slupianek (born 1956), retired world champion shot putter who competed for East Germany
- Ilona Sojda (born 1987), Polish singer
- Ilona Staller (born 1951), a.k.a. Cicciolina, Hungarian-born Italian porn-star, sometime politician, and singer
- Ilona Štěpánová-Kurzová (1899–1975), Czech concert pianist and piano teacher
- Ilona Stetina (1855–1932), Romanian educator and activist
- Ilona Szabó de Carvalho (born 1978), Brazilian political scientist
- Ilona Szatmári Waldau (born 1962), Swedish politician
- Ilona Szilágyi (before 1455–1497), Hungarian princess consort of Wallachia as the second wife of Vlad III the Impaler
- Ilona Szoyer (1879–1956), opera singer
- Ilona Szwarc, Polish photographer
- Ilona Timchenko, Russian pianist
- Ilona Tolnai-Rákhely (1921–2011), Hungarian sprinter
- Ilona Tóth (1932–1957), Hungarian dissident
- Ilona Tőzsér, Hungarian sprint canoer
- Ilona Tyuryaeva (born 1968), Transnistrian politician
- Ilona Uhlíková-Voštová (born 1954), Czechoslovak table tennis player
- Ilona Usovich (born 1982), Belarusian sprinter
- Ilona Váradi (1891–1945), Hungarian tennis player
- Ilona Vargha (1907–1973), Hungarian fencer
- Ilona Verley (born 1995), Canadian drag performer
- Ilona Vincze-Krausz (1902–1998), Hungarian-Israeli piano teacher
- Ilona Vörösmarty (1846–1910), Hungarian noblewoman
- Ilona Walta (born 2006), Finnish footballer
- Ilona Yudina (1984–2018), Ukrainian sitting volleyball player
- Ilona Zeynalová (born 2005), Azerbaijani rhythmic gymnast
- Ilona Zrínyi (1643–1703), Hungarian-Croatian countess

== See also ==
- Ilonka (disambiguation)
- Elonka (disambiguation)
