= Metropolia =

Metropolia may mean:

- Metropolis (religious jurisdiction), overseen by a metropolitan bishop
- Diocese, or more particularly Archdiocese
- Metropolia, the pre-1970 general term for the Russian Orthodox Greek Catholic Church in U.S.A., now known as the Orthodox Church in America
- Metropolia, a Polish Business Magazine published in the UK since 2007
- Metropolia University of Applied Sciences, Helsinki Metropolitan Area, Finland
