= German Comic Con =

Fan convention

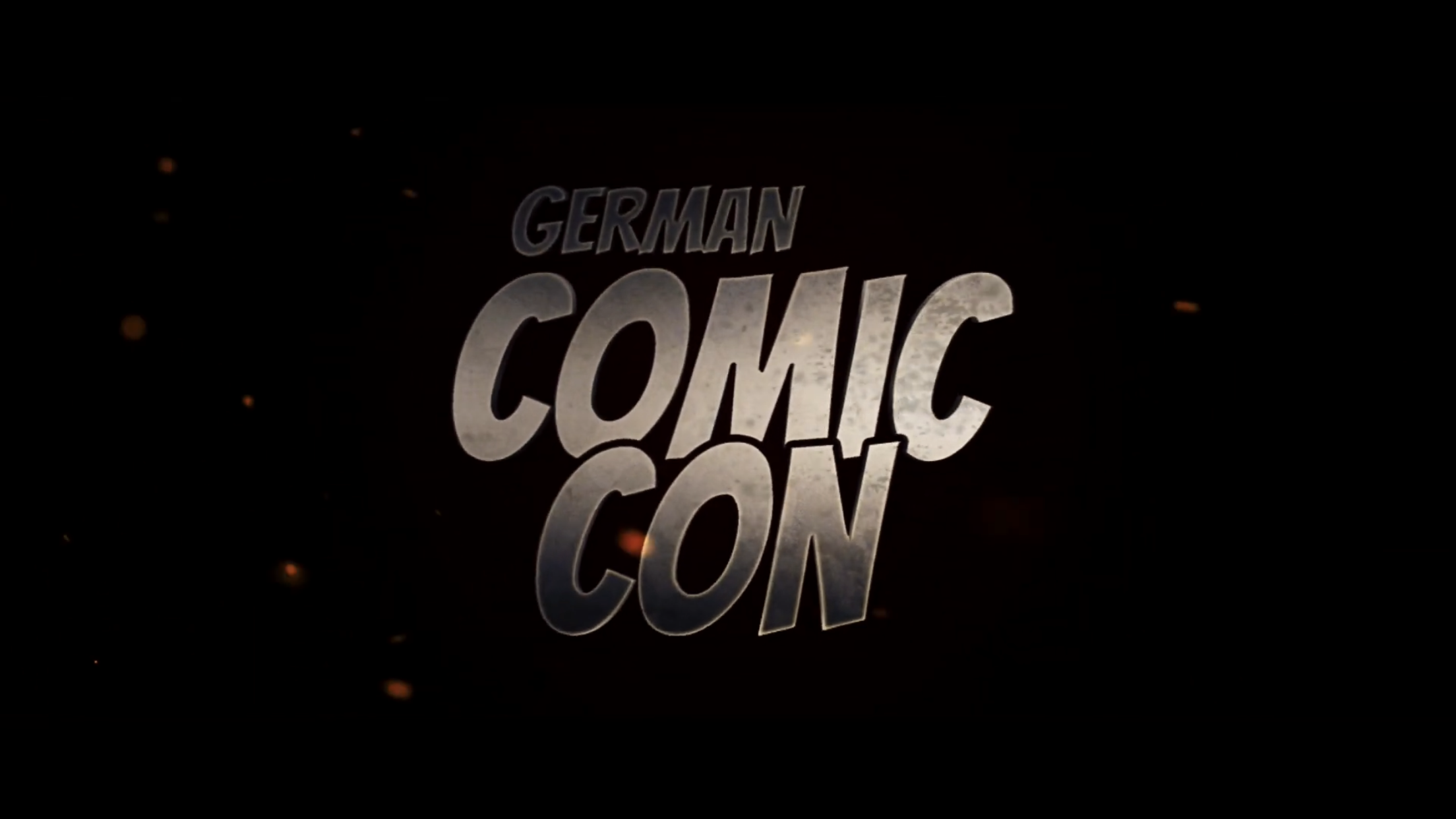
- Status: Active
- Genre: Speculative fiction
- Country: Germany
- Inaugurated: 2015
- Website: germanfilmcomiccon.com

German Comic Con (or German Film & Comic Con) is a fan convention organised by Cool Conventions and Showmasters Events first held at the Westfalenhallen in Dortmund in December 2015. It was the first event of its kind, modeled after the San Diego and New York Comic Cons, and has since taken place in Dortmund, Munich, Berlin, and Frankfurt.

German Comic Con has been affiliated with Comic Con Ahoy in Rotterdam, Filmbörse, German Castle Con, and Weekend of Hell. The Rudolph Dirks Award is presented at German Comic Con.

== Locations and dates ==
=== 2010s ===
Year	Location	Venue	Dates	Attendance	Guests
2015	Dortmund	Westfalenhallen	31 March – 1 April	30,000	Addy Miller, James Marsters, Jason Isaacs, John Layman, Keith Allan, Laurie Holden, Lea Thompson, Manu Bennett, Melody Anderson, Michael Dudikoff, Nathalie Emmanuel, Pisay Pao, Rory McCann, Russell Hodgkinson, Sam Jones III, Stanislaw Janewski, Stephen Lang, Sylvester McCoy, Thomas Jane, William Baldwin Arild Midthun, Chad Rook, Felix Mertikat, Ingo Römling, Kari Korhonen
2016	Berlin	STATION Berlin	14–16 October	30,000	Amanda Bearse, Billie Piper, Chad L. Coleman, Christopher Lloyd, Christopher Lambert, Dan Starkey, Devon Murray, Ellie Kendrick, Erik Kriek, Famke Janssen, Greg Grunberg, James Marsters, Ken Colley, Ken Kirzinger, Mickey Lewis, Natalia Tena, Paul Blake, Ray Park, Robert Englund, Roy Scammell, Sylvester McCoy, Taimak, Tosin Cole Anna Backhausen, Annalisa Leoni, Daniel Lieske, Don Rosa, Davide Gianfelice, Federica Manfredi, Felix Pestemer, Flavia Scuderi, Guillaume Bianco, James Turek, Kaja Reinki, Laura Zuccheri, Marco Tabilio, M. Zachary Sherman, Nana Yaa, Paolo Bacilieri, Paolo Recchioni, Rahsan Ekedal, Sascha Wüstefeld, Sophie Schönhammer, Steve Scott, Ulf S. Graupner, Werther Dell'Edera
2016	Dortmund	Westfalenhallen	2–4 December	45,000	Alice Krige, Anna Walton, Andrew-Lee Potts, Clive Standen, Daniel Portman, Danny Glover, David Hasselhoff, Gareth David-Lloyd, Greyston Holt, Hannah Spearritt, Jodi Lyn O'Keefe, Michael Madsen, Mike Edmonds, Neil Bishop, Pamela Anderson, Paul Springer, Ron Perlman, Ryan Hurst, Samantha Alleyne, Simon Williamson, Stefan Kapicic, Trevor Butterfield Aaron Lopresti, Akira Himekawa, Che Rossié, Daniel Lieske, Enzo Sciotti, Ingo Römling, Jef, Nana Yaa, Nils Oskamp, M. Zachary Sherman, Peter Snejbjerg, Sana Takeda, Timo Würz
2017	Frankfurt	Messe Frankfurt	22–23 April		Afshan Azad, Alicia Witt, Alistair Petrie, Andrew-Lee Potts, Benjamin Hartley, Camille Coduri, Casper Zafer, Chany Dakota, Christopher Lambert, Daniel Naprous, Daniel Portman, Drew Powell, Erin Richards, Hannah Spearritt, Harry Melling, Jaiden Kaine, Keanu Rapp, Kim Coates, Nadia Hilker, Natalia Tena, Néstor Carbonell, Robin Lord Taylor, Ryan Gage, Ryan Hurst, Sean Pertwee, Sylvester McCoy, TJ Thyne, Zarene Dallas André Sedlaczek, Chris Kloiber, Denis Metz, Haiko Höring, Joscha Sauer, Marc Blinn, Marc Uhlenhaut, Marius Pawlitza, Martin Perscheid, Michael Holtschulte, Miguel Fernandez Martinez, Oli Hilbring, Philipp Dörr, Thorsten Brochhaus
2017	Munich	MOC	27–28 May		Addy Miller, Alfie Allen, Anthony Higgins, Ari Lehman, Brighton Sharbino, Charisma Carpenter, Dean Cain, Emily Kinney, Gemma Whelan, Hugh Quarshie, Jeffrey Combs, Julie Benz, Kelly Rutherford, Kyla Kenedy, Lindsey Morgan, Lisa Wilcox, Max Grodénchik, Nadia Hilker, Nana Visitor, Olga Fonda, RJ Mitte, Samuel Anderson, Sarah Butler, Sylvester McCoy, Wolf Kahler Boris Mihajlovic, Chris Kloiber, Dave Lung, Laura Schönhoff, Philipp Dör, Rainer Engel
2017	Berlin	STATION Berlin	30 September – 1 October		Alan Flyng, Alan Harris, Alfie Allen, Andrew-Lee Potts, Anthony Forrest, Carice van Houten, Charles Rettinghaus, Colin Baker, Connor Trinneer, Daniel Portman, David Morrissey, Finn Jones, Hannah Spearritt, Walton Goggins, Jack Gleeson, Jeremy Bulloch, Jodi Lyn O’Keefe, Keisha Castle-Hughes, Kim Coates, Lee Majors, Marion von Stengel, Michael Madsen, Nicole De Boer, Pamela Anderson, Pearl Mackie, Rusty Goffe, Sacha Dhawan, Sam Jones, Thomas Petruo, Tom Wilson, Wai Ching Ho André Sedlaczek, Chris Kloiber, Flemming Andersen, Marc Blinn, Miguel Fernandez Martinez, Thilo Krapp, Ulrich Schröder
2017	Dortmund	Westfalenhallen	9–10 December		Alexis Denisof, Alyson Hannigan, Amber Rose Revah, Billy Boyd, Bruce Langley, Carl Weathers, Christopher Judge, Christopher Lambert, Daniel Naprous, Devon Murray, Ellie Kendrick, Finn Wolfhard, Indigo, Iyari Limon, Jaleel White, James Marsters, Kristian Nairn, Mark Williams, Peter Facinelli, Peter Weller, Ricky Whittle, Robert Englund, Ross Mullan, Samantha Smith, Sarah Hagan, Sean Biggerstaff, Staz Nair, Tamara Taylor, TJ Thyne, Valene Kane, Vladimir Furdik, Wentworth Miller Alejandro Miranda, André Poloczek, Ari Plikat, Andreas Eikenroth, Chris Kloiber, Dagmar Gosejacob, Holga Rosen, Marc Blinn, Marc Uhlenhaut, Martin Perscheid, Maxim Seehagen, Michael Holtschulte, Olga Hopfauf, Oli Hilbring, Philip Doerr, Piero Masztalerz, Ralf Marczinczik, Stephan Baumgarten, Thilo Krapp, Thorsten Brochhaus, Timo Wuerz, Tommy Wagner, Viktor Bogdanovic
2018	Frankfurt	Messe Frankfurt	5–6 May		Aimee Garcia, Candice King, Ghadah Al-Akel, Ingo Albrecht, Jeremy Bulloch, Jerome Flynn, Kate Dickie, Manuel Straube, Mark Boone Junior, Michael Biehn, Robert Patrick, Rutger Hauer, Sean Gunn, Theo Rossi, Thomas Müller, Tobias Müller, Valene Kane Daniel Katanovic, Marc Uhlenhaut, Philipp Doerr
2018	Munich	MOC	15–16 September		Bene Gutjan, Charles Dance, Chelsey Reist, Christopher Larkin, Danay García, Ekkehardt Belle, Elizabeth Webster, Giancarlo Esposito, IronE Singleton, Iwan Rheon, Jodi Lyn O'Keefe, Keisha Castle-Hughes, Mark Steger, Sabine Bohlmann, Tom Wlaschiha, Wolfgang Müller Birger, Chris Kloiber
2018	Berlin	STATION Berlin	20–21 October		AJ McLean, Billy Boyd, Candice King, Chelsey Reist, Daniel Gillies, David Alpay, Emma Bell, Gerrit Schmidt-Foß, Ghadah Al-Akel, Giancarlo Esposito, Howie Dorough, Iain Glen, Ingo Albrecht, Jessica Henwick, Joshua Mikel, Kristanna Loken, Manuel Straube, Mark Ryan, Martyn Ford, Max Felder, Michael Rooker, Nathaniel Buzolic, Ralf David, Sandro Blümel, Tom Hopper, Tommy Morgenstern Arne Jysch, Atir Kerroum, Axel Kruse, Bernd Perplies, Bernhard Hennen, David Mack, Dirk van den Boom, Don Rosa, Claudya Schmidt, Émile Bravo, Fabian Dombrowski, Fil, Flix, Francis Bergese, Frank Engelhardt, Fufu Frauenwahl, Hamed Eshrat, James C. Mulligan, Jörg Buttgereit, Ju Honisch, Julia Dippel, Kai Meyer, Kaja Reinki, Lieven L. Litaer, Liza Grimm, Mawil, Michael Peinkofer, M.W. Ludwig, OL, Peter R. Krüger, Rainer Engel, Robert Corvus, Sascha Wüstefeld, Tim Dinter, Tobias Meißner, Ulf Graupner
2018	Dortmund	Westfalenhallen	1–2 December		Anthony Head, Caroline Munro, Chuck Norris, Clarence Gilyard, Cody Saintgnue, Daniel Portman, Dennis Schmidt-Foß, Dylan Sprayberry, Erika Eleniak, Franco Nero, Gwendoline Christie, Hayley Law, Ingo Albrecht, Ivana Miličević, Jack Gleeson, Jason Priestley, Jessica Henwick, Joseph Marcell, Julian Glover, Kevin Sussman, La Toya Jackson, Lena Headey, Marcus Off, Martin Klebba, Maude Hirst, Natalia Tena, Nia Peeples, Noah Schnapp, Oliver Bartkowski, Robert Patrick, Ron Donachie, Ryan Kelley, Steven Seagal, Sven Bergmann, Tara Reid, Tom Hopper, Tommy Morgenstern André Sedlaczek, Ari Plikat, Claudya Schmidt, Florian Biege, Frauke Berger, Martin Perscheid, Matt Davis, Michael Holtschulte, Oli Hilbring, Olivia Vieweg
2019	Dortmund (spring edition)	Westfalenhallen	13–14 April		Beau Gadsdon, Camren Bicondova, Charlie Sheen, Chosen Jacobs, Chris Bunn, Christopher Fairbank, Cody Saintgnue, Danielle Panabaker, Denise Crosby, Dolly Gadsdon, Donal Logue, Drew Powell, Dustin Rhodes, Elizabeth Olsen, Erin Richards, Hannah Murray, Jennifer Morrison, Jeremy Ray Taylor, Kevin McNally, Kevin Nash, Lee Majors, Nadia Hilker, Osric Chau, Richard Harmon, Robin Lord Taylor, Sean Pertwee, Seth Gilliam, Silvia Schmitt (Topenga), Steven Ogg, Temirlan Blaev, Tom Noonan, Tonya Pinkins André Sedlaczek, Florian Biege, Michael Holtschulte, Rainer Engel
2019	Munich	MOC	15–16 June		Carlos Valdes, Casey Cott, Chad L. Coleman, Dave Lung, David Mazouz, Devon Murray, Dominic Purcell, Franco Nero, Gates McFadden, Laurie Holden, Lena Headey, Manu Bennet, Robert Englund, Rusty Goffe, Sean Biggerstaff, Sean Pertwee Cristin Wendt, Jan Gulbransson, Rötger Feldmann
2019	Berlin	STATION Berlin	28–29 September		Afshan Azad, Art Parkinson, Bai Ling, Barbara Nedeljáková, Cam Gigandet, Christian Zeiger, Christopher Larkin, Costas Mandylor, Ellie Kendrick, Fabian Hollwitz, Georgina Leonidas, Ingo Albrecht, Isaac Hempstead-Wright, Jaiden Kaine, James C Mulligan, Jason Isaacs, Kristian Nairn, Manu Bennett, Mary Chieffo, Rainer Engel, Ralf David, Richard Burgi, Ron Perlman, Scott Patterson, Steven Ogg, Tommy Flanagan, William Lustig Cristin Wendt, Claudya Schmidt, Flavia Scuderi, Florian Biege, Katrin Gal
2019	Dortmund	Westfalenhallen	1–2 December		Alanna Masterson, Alicia Silverstone, Annabeth Gish, Ashley Benson, Avi Nash, Bai Ling, Billy Zane, Brant Daugherty, Brenda Strong, Brian Krause, Brighton Sharbino, Callan McAuliffe, Carice van Houten, Cassady McClincy, Charles Rettinghaus, Christopher Lloyd, Cooper Andrews, Daniel Gillies, Daniel Logan, Daphne Reid, David Harbour, David Warner, Dennis Schmidt-Foß, Dominic Purcell, Donald Sumpter, Drew Fuller, Dylan Sprayberry, Edward James Olmos, Emily Kinney, Gemma Whelan, Gethin Anthony, Giancarlo Esposito, Gregg Sulkin, Hafþór Júlíus Björnsson, Henry Thomas, Holly Marie Combs, Huw Collins, Ian Harding, Ian Somerhalder, Ilona Otto, Jack Klaff, Jake Busey, Janel Parrish, Jeremy Davies, Jerome Flynn, Jill Böttcher, Joshua Mikel, Judge Reinhold, Kae Alexander, Karyn Parsons, Katelyn Nacon, Katie Cassidy, Keegan Allen, Kelly Rutherford, Kim Coates, Kristin Bauer, Laura Leighton, Liam Cunningham, Madison Lintz, Manu Bennett, Mark Boone Junior, Mark Dacascos, Mary McDonnell, Matt Lintz, Meat Loaf, Melissa McBride, Michael Cudlitz, Michael Traynor, Michael Trevino, Mike Edmonds, Mitch Pileggi, Nadine Marissa, Nathalie Emmanuel, Nicholas Lea, Nick Carter, Olga Fonda, Paul Blake, Paul Wesley, Priah Ferguson, Riley Voelkel, Robert Buckley, Robert MacNaughton, Ross Marquand, Ross Mullan, Ryan Hurst, Saxon Sharbino, Seth Gilliam, Shannon Elizabeth, Sting, Steven Berkoff, Steven Yeun, Tammin Sursok, Theo Rossi, Thomas Ian Nicholas, Tom Felton, Troian Bellisario Daniel Lieske, Dominik Wendland, Flavia Scuderi, Florian Biege, Katja Klengel, Mawil, Ralf Schlüter

=== 2020s ===
Year	Location	Venue	Dates	Attendance	Guests
2020	Home Edition	Online			Afshan Azad, Danielle Tabor, Daniel Naprous, Daniel Portman, Devin Murray, Gemma Whelan, Georgina Leonidas, Gethin Anthony, Iwan Rheon, Katie Leung, Marc Rissmann, Maude Hirst, Natalia Tena
2021	Dortmund (limited edition)	Westfalenhallen	31 July – 1 August		Adelaide Kane, Christopher Lambert, Cinzia Monreale, Georgia Hirst, Giovanni Lombardo Radice, James Faulkner, Leigh Gill, Lilly Aspell, Marco Ilsø, Therica Wilson-Read André Sedlaczek, Jana Heidersdorf, Michael Holtschulte
2021	Dortmund (limited edition)	Westfalenhallen	11–12 September		Alex Høgh Andersen, Arti Shah, Elizabeth Henstridge, Enrique Arce, John Rhys Davies, Josefin Asplund, Kai Owen, Liam McIntyre, Luka Peroš, Manu Bennett, Nick E. Tarabay, Paul Blackthorne, Rose Reynolds, Stephen Cardenas, Stephanie Silva, Toby Regbo, Toby Stephens, Wilf Scolding
2021	Dortmund	Westfalenhallen	3–5 December		Afshan Azad, Alex Høgh Andersen, Alexander Ludwig, Alfred Enoch, Anna Popplewell, Ashley Greene, Brian Krause, Chandler Riggs, Chelsey Reist, Christopher Lloyd, Clive Standen, Daniel Gillies, Daniel Portman, Daniel Zillman, David Mazouz, DJ Qualls, Erin Richards, Eva Habermann, Georgia Hirst, Gethin Anthony, Gustaf Skarsgård, Huw Collins, Ian Harding, Jenette Goldstein, Jodi Lyn O'Keefe, Ivana Baquero, Julian Kostov, Kim Coates, Lana Parrilla, Leigh Gill, Luka Peroš, Manu Bennett, Marios Gavrilis, Matthew Lewis, Maude Hirst, Michel Qissi, Misha Collins, Nadia Hilker, Natalia Tena, Ricky Whittle, Rusty Goffe, Sasha Pieterse, Travis Fimmel, Vladimir Furdik André Sedlaczek, Michael Holtschulte
