= Ilona Kurdy =

Hungarian painter and sculptor

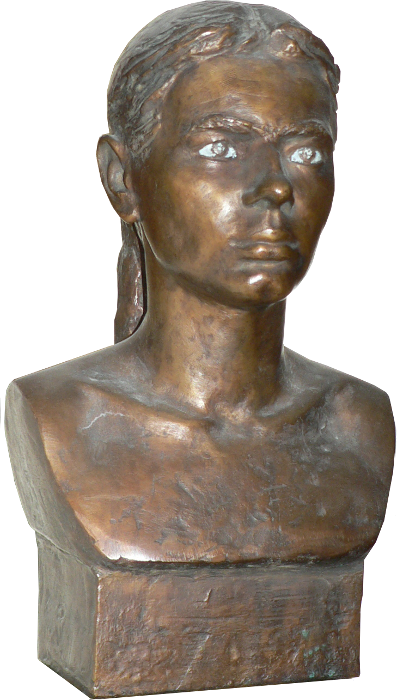
- Bronze self-portrait by Kurdy
- Born: 31 October 1951; Szeged, Hungary
- Died: 23 February 2007 (aged 55)
- Known for: Painting; Sculpture

Ilona Kurdy (31 October 1951 – 23 February 2007) was a Hungarian painter and sculptor.

== Work of arts ==
After finishing the "KISKÉPZŐ" Secondary School of Visual Arts, Budapest (1966–1970), she was private tutored at democratic free schools. She studied to become a sculptor, but her focus kept traversing towards painting. The form-system of her creations is observably of orientalistic secessionistic. Her work topics usually root in the world of mysticism. She studied painting from István Moldován, sculpting from István Kamotsay and Sándor Várady at the Artist Colony of Százados Road, Budapest. She also had the opportunity to have among her masters the sculptors Tibor Borbás, Róbert Csíkszentmihályi and András Laluja as well as graphics artist János Macskássy. She creates her paintings with a unique technique, the paintings reflecting different colors from different viewing angles.

== Individual exhibitions ==
- 1982, District I Community Center, Budapest, exhibition opened by Ö. Gábor Pogány art historian;
- 1982, Béla Kun Community Center, Ózd, exhibition opened by Sándor Várady;
- 1983, Budapest Technical University Club, Budapest;
- 1983, Bástya Gallery, Budapest;
- 1985, District I Community Center, Budapest;
- 1985, Béla Kun Community Center, Ózd;
- 1985, Community Center of Industrial Fitting and Machine Factory, Budakeszi, exhibition opened by Sándor Várady;
- 1987, Metró Club, Budapest, exhibition opened by dr. Rezső Szíj art historian;
- 1987, Buda-Penta Gallery, Budapest, exhibition opened by János Miklós Kádár artist, contributed in the opening ceremony: Péter Andorai performer, the exhibition was evaluated by István Moldován and István Kamotsay;
- 1988, Kurhalle, Wien-Oberlaa;
- 1989, Fáklya Club, Budapest, exhibition opened by Attila Dargay animated movie director;
- 1989, County Community and Youth Center, Szolnok, exhibition opened by Rezső Szíj art historian, contributed in the opening ceremony László Újlaky performer;
- 1990, Buda-Penta Gallery, Budapest;
- 1992, Buda-Penta Gallery, Budapest;
- 1992, Dominican Ambulatory, Hotel Hilton, Budapest;
- 2003, Lincoln Gallery, Millennium Center, Budapest, exhibition opened by D. Dávid Hargitay art historian;
- 2005, Magyarok Háza, Bartók Room, Budapest, exhibition opened by Rezső Szíj art historian, greeting the painter vitéz Imre Kiss, chairman of the Holy Crown Federation, guest performer Dániel Benkő, lyre and guitar artist;

== Assorted grouped exhibitions ==
- 1995, Hungarian Agricultural Museum, Budapest
- 2003, Arts Hall - Institution of the Hungarian Academy of Arts - Antique Enterieur Exhibition, Budapest
- 2004, Inter Gallery - EroticArt Exhibition, Budapest
- 2005, Budapesti Institute of Funeral, The Colors of Silence competition, First prize

== Art pieces in collections ==
- Ráday Museum, Kecskemét - Dr. Rezső Szíj and Rózsa Kovács Scientific and Arts Collection
- Art collection of the Reformed Church, Mosonmagyaróvár - Dr. Rezső Szíj and Rózsa Kovács Scientific and Arts Collection
- Library of the Reformed Church Boarding School, Kecskemét - Dr. Rezső Szíj and Rózsa Kovács Scientific and Arts Collection

== Sources ==
- Ferenc Bánhegyi: Success of paintress from Etyek, Fejér Megyei Hírlap, 23 June 1982;
- Erzsébet Bartha: Exhibition, Ózdi Vasas, 6 August 1982;
- Zoltán Ihász: Ilona Kurdy's Exhibition, Ózdi Vasas, 13 August 1982;
- Ilona Kurdy: The Pair of Us, Vasárnapi hírek, 1987. júl. 5;
- News, Népszabadság, 29 June 1987;
- Gy. Seregély: Collected Data and Biography Lexicon of Hungarian Painters and Graphic Artists, 1800-1988. Szeged;
- Dr. R. Szíj: The Rezső Szíj - Rózsa Kovács Collection, 1988. Mosonmagyaróvár;
- Gyula Kőműves: Laudation of Nice-looking Things, Szabad Föld, 19 December 1989;
- M.V.: Wonders are born every day in the porched farmhouse, Blikk, Budapest, 19 July 1997;
- Lexicon of Hungarian Contemporary Artists;
- Hübners Who Is Who in Hungary, Who is Who Verlag für Personenenzyklopädien AG, 2004;
- Zoltán Trencsényi: In past tense, Népszabadság Online, 2005. június 13.
- Registry of students graduated at "Kisképző" Secondary School of Visual Arts, Budapest
