= Elonka =

Elonka may refer to:

- Elonka Dunin (b. 1958), American game developer and author of books and articles on cryptography
- Stephen Michael Elonka (d. 1983), author of numerous technical books, and creator of the fictional engineer Marmaduke Surfaceblow
- Elonka, aboriginal name for Marsdenia australis, an Australian fruit and the associated totem

== See also ==
- Ilonka
