= Ilona Jokinen =

Finnish soprano opera singer (born 1981)

- Born: Finland
- Occupation: Opera Singer

Ilona Jokinen (born 1981) is a Finnish soprano opera singer whose repertoire ranges from Baroque to contemporary music.

== Education ==
Jokinen earned her bachelor's degree in singing pedagogy at the Helsinki Polytechnic. She studied opera under Pirkko Törnqvist-Paakkanen and Ritva Auvinen at Sibelius Academy, Helsinki, Finland. She graduated in 2009 and later continued her vocal studies with Tom Krause.

== Career ==
Ilona Jokinen has held prominent roles at Savonlinna Opera Festival and Finnish National Opera. Her operatic career has included performances of Carmen, Tannhäuser and The Marriage of Figaro.

Jokinen has performed with Finnish and Baltic ensembles including Lahti Symphony Orchestra, Cantores Minores and Tallinn Baroque Orchestra, and is frequently performs Lieder in addition to her operatic work.

In addition to Finland, she has sung in Japan, Ireland, Spain, and the United States.

In 2017, Jokinen performed art songs and arias at the First Congregational Church in Shrewsbury. Accompanied by pianist Olga Rogach, Jokinen sang in six languages - Finnish, Swedish, Russian, Latin, Italian and French.

== Awards ==
Jokinen has won prizes in Finnish national singing competitions and Lied music competitions, such as first prize in Pentti Koskimies Lied competition and third prize at the Merikanto singing competition and Toivo Kuula competition.
