= EVTEK =

Coordinates: 60.22145°N 24.80496°E

EVTEK University of Applied Sciences (formerly Espoo-Vantaa Institute of Technology or Espoon-Vantaan teknillinen ammattikorkeakoulu in Finnish, abbr. EVTEK) was one of Finland's applied science polytechnics. In August 2008, EVTEK University of Applied Sciences together with Helsinki Polytechnic Stadia merged into Helsinki Metropolia University of Applied Sciences.

EVTEK University of Applied Sciences offered degree programs in technology, business and art & design leading to either a bachelor's or master's degree.

== History ==
EVTEK was established as a technical institute in 1985 and it received accreditation to become a polytechnic in 1996. EVTEK offered 12 degree programs in technology studies. Most of the faculty and staff were recruited from Helsinki University of Technology or industry.
