= Neil Donahue =

American atmospheric chemist

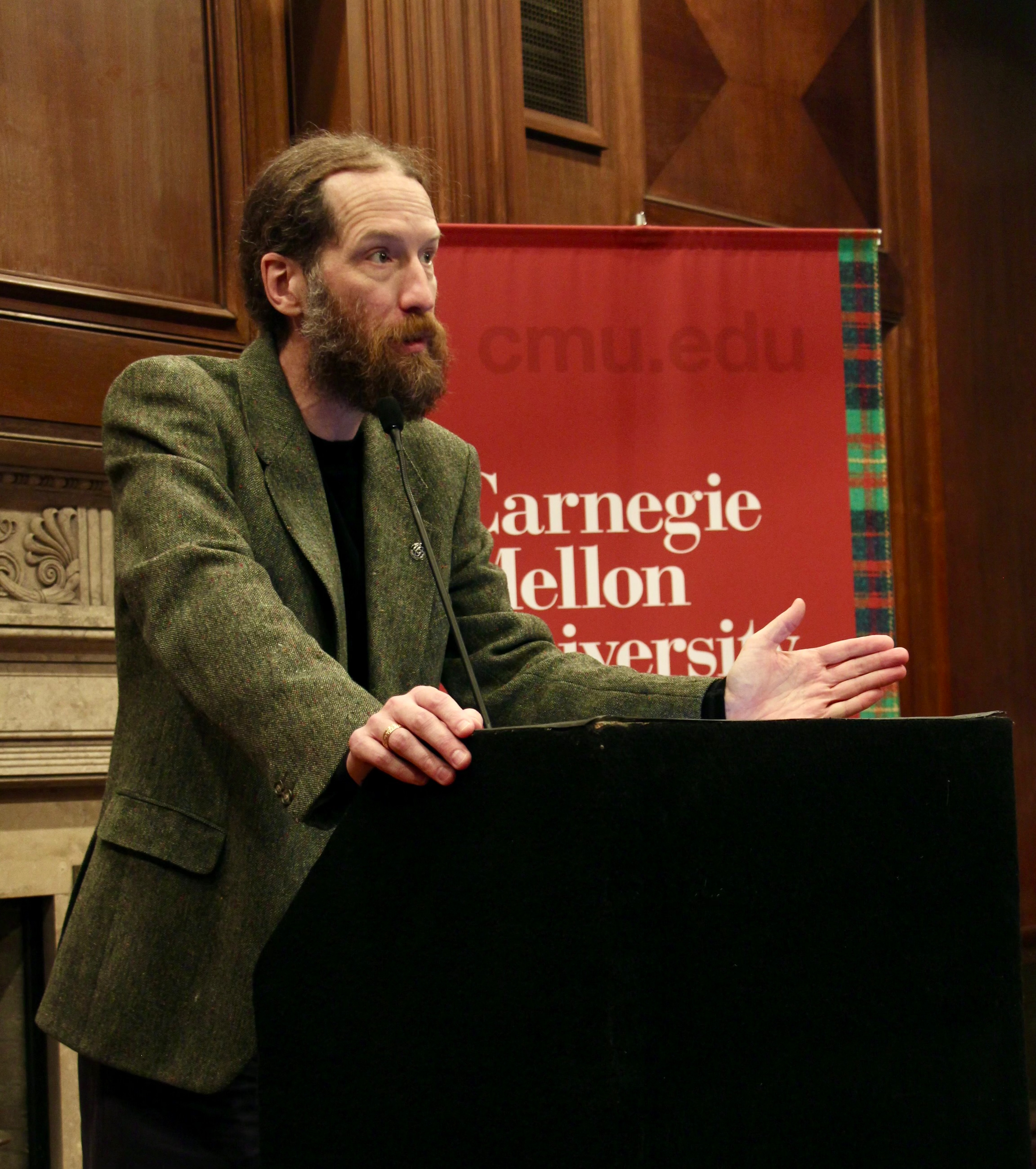
- Born: 1963
- Education: Brown University; MIT
- Known for: Work on the behavior of particulate matter in the atmosphere
- Father: Thomas Michael Donahue
- Scientific career
- Fields: Atmospheric chemistry; Meteorology
- Institutions: Harvard; Carnegie Mellon
- Thesis: Nonmethane hydrocarbon chemistry in the remote marine atmosphere
- Doctoral advisor: Ronald G. Prinn
- Other academic advisors: James G. Anderson
- Notable students: Ilona Riipinen

Neil McPherson Donahue is an American atmospheric chemist. He is the Thomas Lord Professor of Chemical Engineering, Chemistry, Engineering and Public Policy at Carnegie Mellon University and since 2013 has directed the school's Steinbrenner Institute for Environmental Education and Research. His research has focused on the origin and transformations of very small organic particles, which play a critical role in climate change and human health. He is a highly cited researcher.

== Early life and education ==
Donahue is from Pittsburgh, Pennsylvania. His father, Thomas Michael Donahue, was a prominent space scientist who taught at the University of Pittsburgh and later the University of Michigan.

Donahue attended Brown University, where he received a Bachelor of Arts degree in physics in 1985. At Brown, Donahue and his friends participated in environmental activism. He was one of five students to live in the newly-renovated 'Urban Environmental Lab', a project that investigated possibilities for more environmentally friendly living when it first opened in fall of 1983.

Donahue attended the Massachusetts Institute of Technology for doctoral studies, graduating with a Ph.D. in meteorology in 1991.

== Career ==
Donahue completed postdoctoral work at Harvard University as a research scientist under James G. Anderson and began teaching at Carnegie Mellon in 2000. In 2005, he founded the Center for Atmospheric Particle Studies, which he directed until 2013.

In 2011, he was admitted as a fellow to the American Geophysical union, for "pioneering contributions to our understanding of atmospheric organic chemistry with emphasis on the formation of organic particulate matter."

In 2019, Donahue was elevated to the rank of University Professor, the highest faculty standing at Carnegie Mellon. In 2020, Donahue was announced as the first editor-in-chief of Environmental Science: Atmospheres.

== Awards and honors ==
- 1985 — MIT Jule Charney Award
- 1985–1988 — NASA Graduate Student Researcher
- 1991–1993 — DOE Distinguished Postdoctoral Fellow
- 2011 — Fellow, American Geophysical Union
- 2016 — Pittsburgh Award for Creative Advances in Environmental Science and Technology from the American Chemical Society.
- 2017 — Gustavus Esselen Award for Chemistry in the Public Interest from the American Chemical Society.
- 2019 — Jule Gregory Charney Lecture
- 2019 — Fellow, American Association for Aerosol Research (AAAR)
- 2021 — World's most highly cited researchers
- 2022 — David Sinclair award from the AAAR
- 2023 — American Chemical Society Award for Creative Advances in Environmental Science & Technology
