= Thomas Michael Donahue =

American astronomer (1921–2004)

- Born: January 23, 1921; Healdton, Oklahoma, U.S.
- Died: October 16, 2004 (aged 83); Ann Arbor, Michigan, U.S.
- Education: Rockhurst College; Johns Hopkins University
- Children: Brian Donahue; Kevin Donahue; Neil Donahue

Thomas Michael Donahue (May 23, 1921 – October 16, 2004) was an American physicist, astronomer, and space and planetary scientist.

Donahue graduated in 1942 from Rockhurst College in Kansas City, Missouri and received in 1947 his PhD in physics from Johns Hopkins University, with an interruption of his graduate studies by WW II and service in the Army Signal Corps.

After three years as a post-doctoral research associate and assistant professor at Hopkins, Tom joined the University of Pittsburgh Physics Department in 1951. At Pittsburgh he organized an atomic physics and atmospheric science program that led to experimental and theoretical studies of the upper atmosphere of the Earth and other solar system planets with instruments flown on sounding rockets and spacecraft. He became Professor of Physics in 1959 and eventually Director of the Laboratory for Atmospheric and Space Sciences and the Space Research Coordination Center at the University. In 1960 he spent a sabbatical year on a Guggenheim Fellowship at the Service d'Aeronomie in Paris, which began collaborations with French colleagues that flourished for more than 40 years. In 1974 he became the Chairman of the Atmospheric and Oceanic Science Department, University of Michigan, a position he held until 1981.

According to the fall 2004 newsletter of the University of Michigan's department of atmospheric, oceanic and space sciences, Donahue said:

I want to know how the planets of the solar system were formed, how they came to evolve as they did and the significance of all that for the existence of life in the solar system and in rest of the universe.

He was Chairman of the Committee on Public Policy of the American Geophysical Union and authored more than 200 research publications. Tom's influence in space exploration spanned many decades and diverse projects. He was an experimenter or interdisciplinary scientist on the orbiting Geophysical Observatory Missions, Apollo-17, Apollo-Soyuz, Voyager, Pioneer Venus Multiprobe and Orbiter, Galileo, Comet Rendezvous Asteroid Flyby, and Cassini. Based on observations by the Pioneer Venus entry probe, he concluded that Venus once had an ocean before a runaway greenhouse effect led to its current state. Analyzing similar data from Martian meteorites, he again argued for a substantial Martian ocean, anticipating the current series of missions to Mars. In these and many other cases he laid the foundation for our current understanding of planetary atmospheres. In 1999, Tom described his career this way, "I parlayed my training in atomic physics into a faculty position at Pitt, doing research in aeronomy and laboratory studies of atomic physics. This led to rocket and satellite exploration of the upper atmosphere of Earth in the 60s and spacecraft exploration of Mars, Venus and the Outer Planets beginning in the 70s. Along the way my students, post-docs and I were deeply involved in the problem of anthropogenic destruction of the stratospheric ozone in the early 70s. This led to my continuing interest in global change."

Upon his death, he was survived by his wife, three sons, and six grandchildren.

== Awards and honors ==
- 1959 — elected a Fellow of the American Physical Society
- 1981 — honorary doctorate from Rockhurst College
- 1981 — Arctowski Medal from the National Academy of Sciences
- 1981 — John Adam Fleming Medal from the American Geophysical Union
- 1983 — elected to the National Academy of Sciences
- 1986 — elected to the International Academy of Astronautics
- 1986 — Henry Russel Lectureship at the University of Michigan
- 1994 — U. of Michigan's Attwood Award for excellence in research
