= Wiener Blut (operetta) =

Operetta by Johann Strauss II

Illustration of the operetta premiere in the Austrian magazine Der Floh by Theo Zasche (1899)

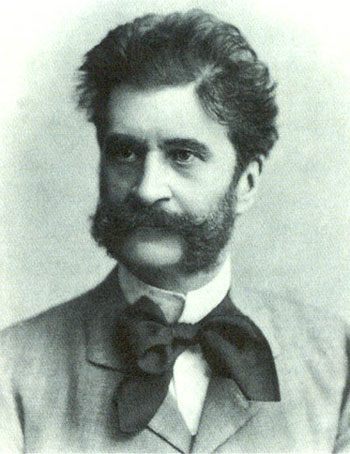
Johann Strauss II

Wiener Blut (Viennese Blood) is an 1899 operetta named after Johann Strauss II's eponymous 1873 waltz. It was made with Strauss' approval, but without his participation. Its score reuses music he wrote for other works along with some music by his brother Josef Strauss; the job of compilation went to Adolf Müller Jr. Its libretto is by Victor Léon and Leo Stein. The setting is the Congress of Vienna. Strauss may have seen a draft of the work, but he died a few months before its 26 October premiere at Vienna's Carltheater. In 1901 the operetta was staged on Broadway under the title Vienna Life at the Broadway Theatre.

== Performance history ==
Franz Jauner produced the costly premiere anticipating great commercial success. But Wiener Blut ran for only thirty performances before making way for Sidney Jones' critically acclaimed The Geisha; in February of the following year Jauner shot himself at his desk in the Carltheater, facing bankruptcy. Five years later, however, when the Theater an der Wien staged a slightly modified Wiener Blut, it caught the public ear, and it has retained a place in the repertory ever since.

In 2007 English Touring Opera mounted a concert production of Wiener Blut at venues throughout the United Kingdom.

== Roles ==
Role	Voice type	Premiere Cast, 26 October 1899 (Conductor: - )
Balduin, Count Zedlau	tenor	Julius Spielmann
Franziska Cagliari	soprano	Ilona Szoyer
Prince Ypsheim-Gindelbach	baritone	Eduard Steinberger
Gabriele, Countess Zedlau	soprano	Marie Merker
Josef	baritone	Louis Treumann
Kagler	bass	Anton Julus
Pepi Pleininger	soprano	Betty Stojan

== Adaptations ==
In 1942 the operetta was adapted into the film Vienna Blood, which became one of the most financially successful films of the Third Reich.
