= Ilonka =

Ilonka is a Hungarian feminine given name. Notable people with the name include:

- Ilonka Elmont (b. 1974), Dutch-Surinamese kickboxer
- Ilonka Karasz, Hungarian-American designer, interior decorator, painter and illustrator
- Ilonka Kovács, birth name of Lucy Doraine, Hungarian film actress
- Sara Ilonka Däbritz

== Fictional characters ==
- Ilonka, the protagonist from "Lovely Ilonka", Hungarian fairy tale
- Ilonka, a character in the 1944 film House of Frankenstein

== See also ==
- Ilona, Hungarian given name
- Elonka (disambiguation)
