= Ilona Khubaeva =

South Ossetian politician

Chairwoman of the Supreme Court of South Ossetia
- In office 26 December 2012 – 19 October 2017
- Preceded by: Atsamaz Bichenov
- Succeeded by: Vitaly Dzhioev (acting)

Ilona Khubaeva is a South Ossetian lawyer and judge who served as the chairwoman of the Supreme Court of South Ossetia, the highest court in the country, from 2012 to 2017.

== Biography ==
=== Early life ===
During the Russo-Georgian war an entire family of Khubaeva's friends, the Kachmazovas, would be wiped out due to claimed bombings performed by the Georgian Army during the fighting in Tskhinvali.

=== Judge ===
Khubaeva would be named the chairwoman of the Supreme Court of South Ossetia on 26 December 2012, in a 26–2 vote by the Parliament of South Ossetia, replacing Atsamaz Bichenov who was removed from office on 19 December.

In 2014, in the capacity as chairwoman of the Supreme Court, Khubaeva upheld the ban of several opposition politicians from standing for the 2014 parliamentary election arguing that living in Russia for any period of time violated the residency requirements to stand.

In 2016 Khubaeva was a member of a committee tasked with rewriting the Constitution of South Ossetia to more focus on legal, political and ideological features and to be more inline with Russian laws.

In 2017, as chairwoman of the Supreme Court, Khubaeva refused to drop charges against former president Eduard Kokoity for illegally crossing the South Ossetian-Russian border and for hosting an illegal rally. Shortly afterwards Khubaeva would resign as chairwoman on 19 October 2017. Her term was set to expire in two months in December, with the remainder of her term being held by Vitaly Dzhioev in an acting capacity.
