= Ilona Katliarenka =

Belarusian synchronized swimmer

Ilona Katliarenka (Илона Котляренко)
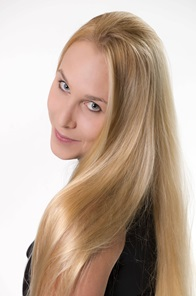

Personal information
- Born: 2 August 1993 (age 32) Minsk, Belarus
- Height: 170 sm
- Weight: 54 kg (119 lb)

Sport
- Country: Belarus
- Sport: Synchronised swimming

Ilona Katliarenka (Илона Котляренко, born 2 August 1993) is a Belarusian synchronized swimmer. Former member of Olympic National team. Multiple times World finalist. "Master of sport of International class” rank.

== Highlights ==
- 2009-2012 National Olympic team member Republic of Belarus.
- Olympic Games in London, 2012: Duet Participated in the Qualification Competition.
- Finalist of World Championship in 2009 (Rome).
- Silver trophy at France International Championship (Paris) 2012-FiNA World Series.
- Bronze trophy at Germany Open Championship (Bonn) 2012-FINA world Series.
- 3 Gold trophies Scandinavian International Championship 2009 (Oulu).
- 4 Gold trophies at Belarus National Championships 2008, 2009, 2010, and 2011.
- 3 Gold trophies Finland Cup Open Championship (Tampere) 2011.

== Career achievement ==
=== 2016 - present ===
“Le Reve-The Dream” show performer. (synchronized swimmer) Wynn hotel. Las Vegas.

=== 2012-2016 ===
Aqua show performer (synchronized swimmer) with Royal Caribbean International on the “Oasis of the Seas” cruise ship.

== Sport competitions and achievement ==
=== 2006 ===
"Common Cup" International Competition in Switzerland.

4th place group routine.

3rd place (Bronze) duet routine.

"Israel Open" Competition.

1st (Gold) duet routine.

2nd (Silver) solo routine.

=== 2007 ===
"Common Cup" International Competition in Israel.

3rd (Bronze) group routine.

5th duet routine.

“Princess of Volga" International Competition in Russia.

3rd place (Bronze) duet routine.

=== 2008 ===
Selected to represent Belarus in the Junior National team.

Winner of Scandinavian Countries Championship (Finland, Oulu) in solo, duet, and group routines.

Junior Europe Championship in Gloucester.

5th in a duet routine and a group routine.

Won Junior Championship of Belarus in solo, duet, and group routines.

=== 2009 ===
Selected to represent Belarus in the Olympic National team.

Europe Championship in Andorra.

6th combo group routine.

World Championship in Rome

7th place combo group routine.

6th place group routine.

Received the ranking of "Master of sport on International Level" from the Belarus government.

Rewarded with President’s scholarship for sporting achievements. Received financial support for Olympic Games preparations.

=== 2010 ===
"Paris Open" Championship

2nd place (Silver) combo group routine.

3rd place (Bronze) group routine.

Europe Senior Championship in Hungary.

6th place group and combo group routines.

Junior World Championship in United States.

7th place duet routine.

=== 2011 ===
"German Open" Championship.

2nd place (Silver) group routine.

Junior Europe Championship in Serbia.

5th place group.

4th place combo routine.

=== 2012 ===
"Bonn Open" Championship.

3rd place (Bronze) group routine.

Europe Championship in Eindhoven.

4th place group and combo group routines.
