= Ilona Dávid =

Hungarian economist

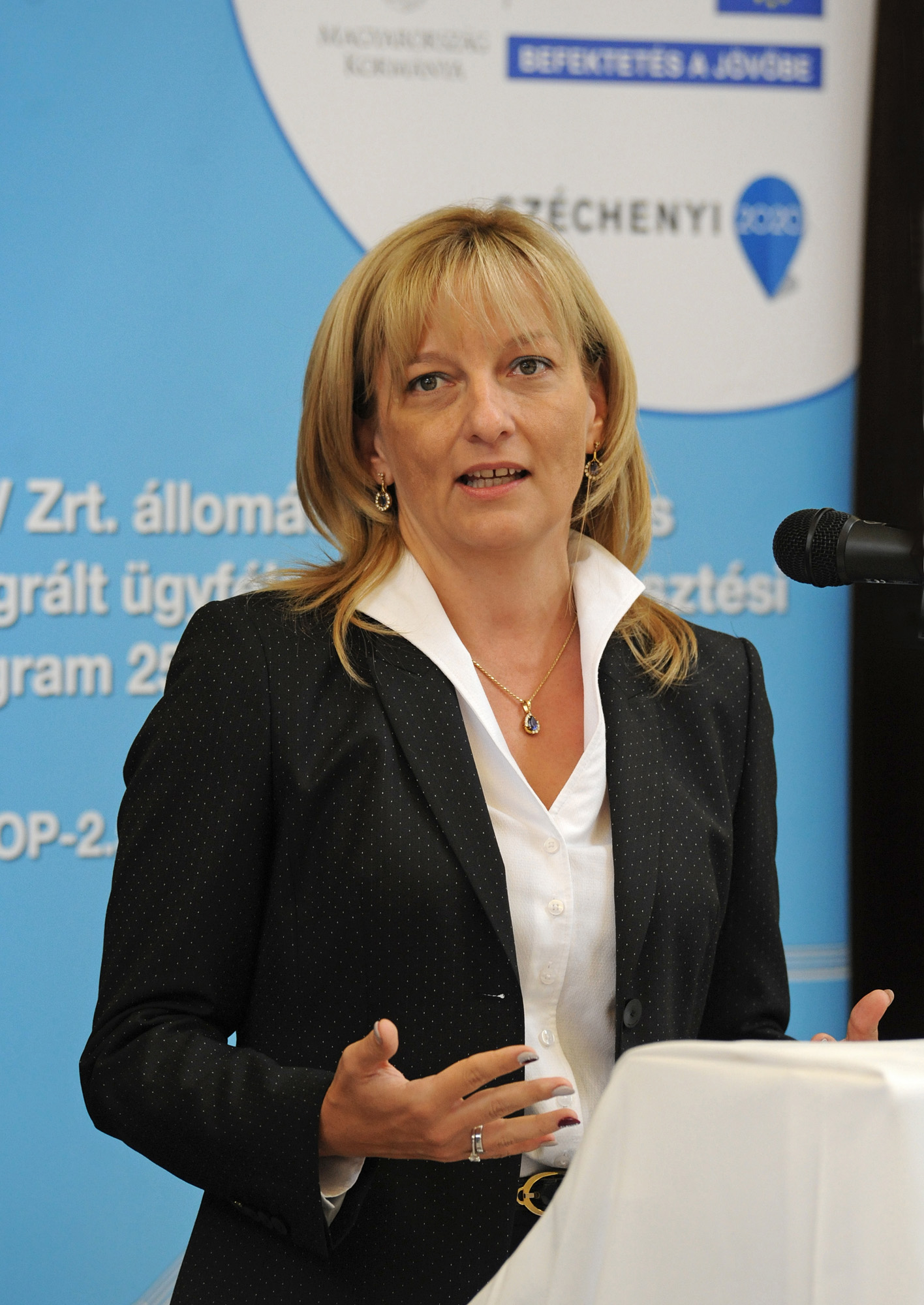
Ilona Dávid in 2015

Ilona Dávid (born in Tata, Hungary on December 30, 1972) economist, Chairwoman of the Board of Directors of GYSEV Zrt. since 2010. President and CEO of Hungarian State Railways Zrt. from 2012 to 2018, chairwoman and chief executive officer of Volánbusz and DAKK Zrt. as well as Chairwoman of the Boards of other five regional bus transport centres (ÉMKK Zrt., DDKK Zrt., ÉNYKK Zrt., KNYKK Zrt., KMKK Zrt.). Since 2017, for the fourth year in a row, she has been ranked in the list of Forbes one of the most influential Hungarian women.

== Career ==
She graduated as an economist on the Budapest Business School, then graduated in management and organization faculty at the Nyugat-Magyarországi Egyetem.

She has begun her professional career as an accountant at the Hungarian company of the SPAR trading chain. Five years later, she changed her position as Chief Accountant and was appointed CFO of Dunaferr Dunai Vasmű, a steel manufacturing company. Then she became the Financial Manager of Lukoil's Hungarian company. As chief financial officer of Duna Autó Zrt., she made a short detour in the field of motor vehicle trade, and since 2005 she has been Head of the Accounting Department of the Magyar Államvasutak Zrt. (MÁV, in English: Hungarian State Railways).

She has been the Chairwoman-CEO of Győr-Sopron-Ebenfurt Vasút Zrt. (GYSEV, in English: Győr-Sopron-Ebenfurt Railway Ltd.) since 2010.

=== At the head of Hungarian State Railways ===
In May 2012 she was appointed chairwoman and chief executive officer of MÁV Zrt., but she still held the chairwomanship of GYSEV.

In recent years, the MÁV Group has reorganized its formerly fragmented railway company through organizational simplification and significantly reduced its debt. For the first time in decades, MÁV Zrt. has been able to achieve a positive operating result and consolidated group-level profit by Dávid and her management.

Since 2012, member of the Steering Committee of the Community of European Railway and Infrastructure Companies, senior committee member of the UIC – International Union of Railways, and vice-president of the Coordination Council of the Trans-Siberian Transport.

Since 2016 she is the President of the Hungarian Railway Association and the President of Consistory of Dunaújvárosi Egyetem (in English: University of Dunaújváros).

In 2017, she was elected co-chairman of the National Association of Strategic- and Public Service Companies and a member of the Supervisory and Audit Committees of MOL Hungarian Oil and Gas Plc.

In September of the same year, she was elected vice-chairwoman of the General Assembly of European Railway and Infrastructure Companies as the only woman among vice-chairmen. The Vice-Presidency post of CER has been performed with the membership of the executive committee of CER for the years 2018–2019.

=== At the head of Volánbusz ===
In 2018, she was appointed the chairwoman and chief executive officer of Volánbusz and Southern Great Plain Transport Center Ltd. with sales of HUF 23 billion and a staff of 17,500 (2018). At the head of Volán and DAKK, she is currently the only one among the managers of the transport centers, who is also in charge of the operational operation, her task is to renew the operation of the two companies. She has a unique insight into domestic road and rail transport, which the government is committed to transforming. Ilona Dávid is also a member of the Ministry of Public Transport working group.

She is the chairwoman of the Board of five other regional bus transport centres: ÉMKK, North Hungarian Transport Center Ltd., DDKK, South Transdanubian Transport Center Ltd., ÉNYKK, Northwest Hungarian Transport Center Ltd., KNYKK, Midwest Hungarian Transport Center Ltd. and KMKK, Middle East Hungarian Transport Center Ltd.

From October 1, 2019, only one public bus company, the Volánbusz Zrt. provides intercity bus services. With the merger of the six regional transport centers as above, with a total of nearly 19,000 employees, the third public company with the largest number of employees in Hungary was formed. The government has hoped that integration will be more effective and efficient. The workers and their jobs were not affected by the merger.

== Awards and tributes ==
- For her work in strengthening international rail links, she was awarded the Golden Chariot Award, one of the highest honours of the Russian Parliament and the Russian Ministry of Transport in 2013.
- In August 2014, in recognition of her exemplary work for the renewal and continuous operation of the domestic railway transport sector, the "Magyar Érdemrend Lovagkereszt polgári tagozat" was awarded to her.
- In 2015, she was awarded the Gold Medal Grade of "Közszolgálatáért Érdemjel".
- In 2017, the Magyarországi Logisztikai Szolgáltató Központok Szövetsége (in English: Association of Hungarian Logistics Service Centres) awarded her the "Logisztikai Érdemrend" (in English: "Logistics Order").
- In 2017 and 2018, Forbes selected her as the most influential Hungarian woman in business. In 2019 and 2020, she was second on the Forbes list.

== Corporate social responsibility ==
- Since 2010 she has been a member of Győr-Moson-Sopron Megyei Közlekedési Balesetmegelőzési Bizottság (Győr-Moson-Sopron County Traffic Accident Prevention Committee).
- Since January 2016 she has been the President of the Dunaújvárosi Egyetem Konzisztórium (in English: Consistory of the University of Dunaújváros)
- Since July 2016, she has been the President of the HUNGRAIL Magyar Vasúti Egyesület (Hungarian Railway Association).
- Since 2017 she has been the chairwoman of the Board of the Vasutas Önkéntes Nyugdíjpénztár (the Voluntary Pension Fund of Railway Employees).

== Positions held in international organizations ==
- Vice-chairwoman of the General Assembly of European Railway and Infrastructure Companies (CER)
- Senior committee member of the UIC – International Union of Railways
- Vice-president of the Transzszibériai Szállítások Koordinációs Tanácsa (TSZKT, in English: Trans-Siberian Transport Coordination Council, TSCC).
