= Ilona Tóth =

Hungarian dissident (1932–1957)

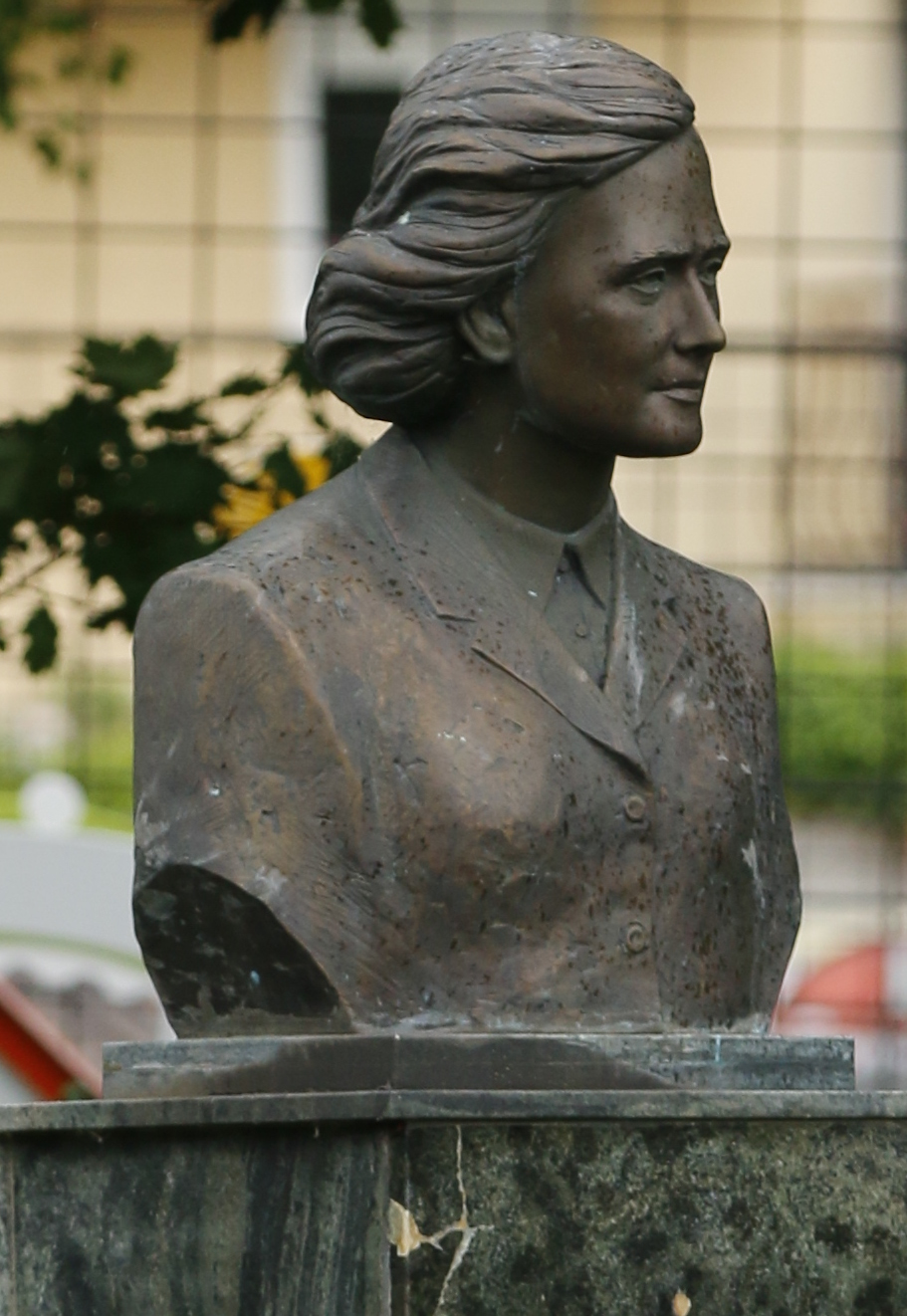
- A bronze bust of Ilona Tóth
- Born: October 23, 1932; Budapest, Kingdom of Hungary
- Died: June 27, 1957 (aged 24); Budapest, Hungarian People's Republic
- Cause of death: Execution by hanging
- Known for: Anti-communist activism in Hungary
- Movement: Hungarian Revolution of 1956
- Criminal charges: Murder of István Kollár
- Criminal penalty: Death by hanging

Ilona Tóth (23 October 1932 – 27 June 1957) was a Hungarian medical student and revolutionary. She participated in the Hungarian Revolution of 1956 and subsequently joined the resistance against communist rule, where she was involved in producing propaganda pamphlets. Tóth was arrested for her printing activities in November 1956, and she was charged as a co-conspirator in a murder carried out by the resistance. She was found guilty, and was executed on 27 June 1957. Tóth's death made her a martyr for the anti-communist cause in Hungary. Her image was rehabilitated after the fall of the communist government in the 1990s, and she was one of many Hungarian dissidents exonerated through "Ilona Tóth's law" in 2000. The extent of her involvement with the murder remains a subject of dispute.

== Biography ==
Ilona Tóth was born on 23 October 1932 and raised by a single mother who worked as a schoolteacher. Tóth was raised in poverty, but she did well in school, participating in several athletic pursuits, including fencing, skydiving, and gliding. Tóth was deeply religious, practicing in the Reformed Church in Hungary. She became a medical student, and accepted an unpaid internship where she managed the annex of a hospital. Tóth provided medical assistance during the Hungarian Revolution of 1956, treating communists and anti-communists who were injured. During the fighting, she at one point obtained a hand grenade and threw it in the direction of a Soviet tank. After the revolution failed, she joined the resistance against communist government in Hungary. Her involvement included sheltering other dissidents and distributing resistance literature. After the arrest of propagandist István Angyal on 16 November 1956, Tóth took charge of the resistance's printing activity.

Tóth was arrested later that month for her involvement in the resistance after police found evidence of her pamphlet distribution. She was charged with the murder of István Kollár, whom the resistance had killed as a suspected government spy. She confessed to the crime at her trial. According to her testimony, she injected him with chloroform, air, and gasoline into his neck and heart before stabbing him with a pocketknife. The killing of Kollár was controversial among the resistance, leading to in-fighting. Tóth's trial was attended by about 300 spectators, but Western media were also present. The government sentenced Tóth to death, which had become a common penalty for dissidents after the Hungarian Revolution in an effort to set examples and discourage future uprisings. Her appeal was rejected, and she was hanged on 27 June 1957. She was one of only five women to be executed by the Hungarian government in the aftermath to the revolution.

== Legacy ==
=== Innocence or guilt ===
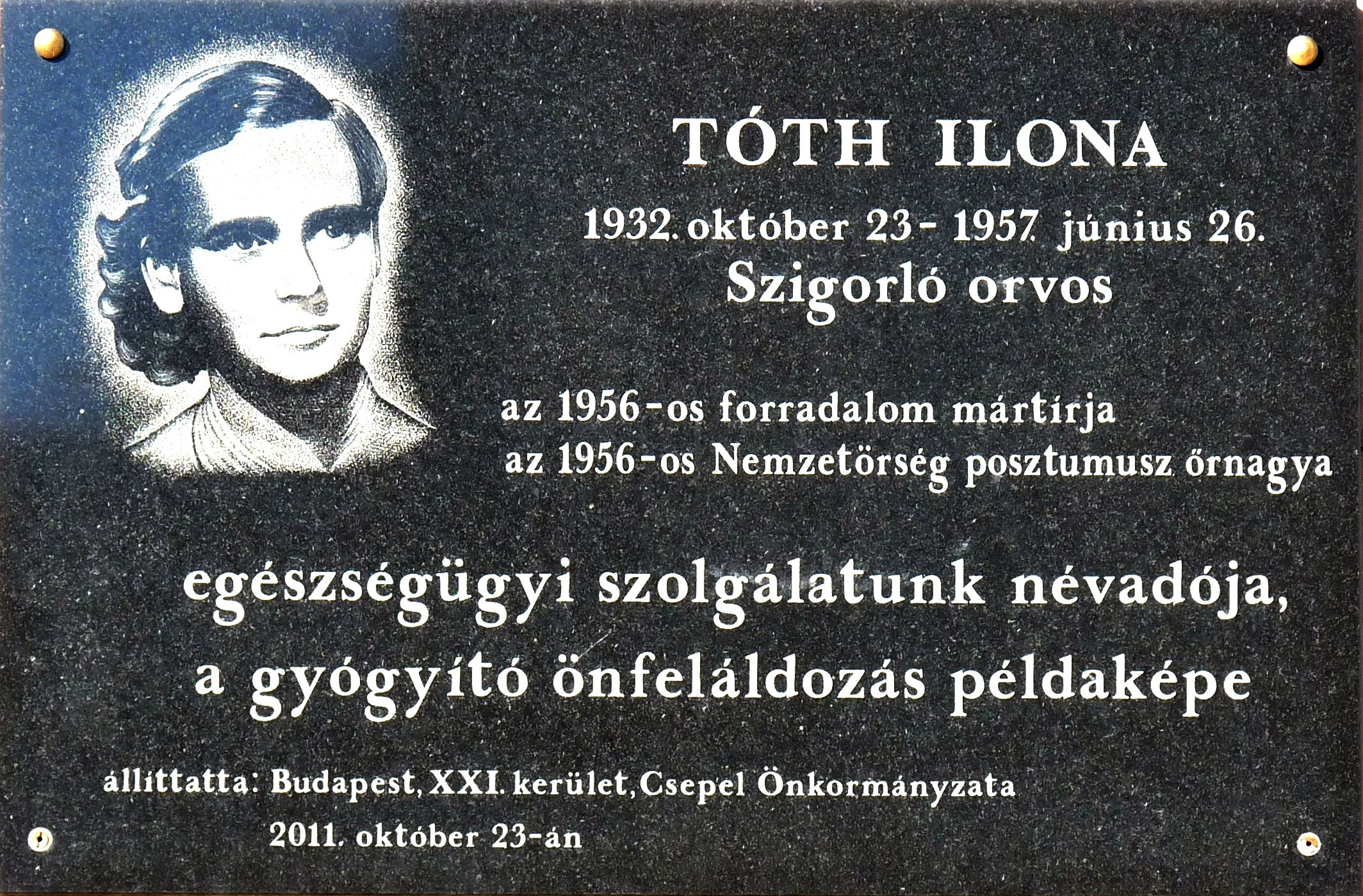
A plaque in Budapest recognizing Ilona Tóth

Tóth's innocence or guilt has remained a subject of debate. Communist governments had developed a reputation for show trials by the time of Tóth's arrest, and critics of Tóth's trial describe it as such. Those who maintain her innocence argue that she confessed to the murder in order to spare her associates who had carried out the killing. Her trial brought international condemnation of Hungary's justice system, leading the communist government to carry out future dissident prosecutions more discreetly. For a time, Tóth's story faded from the public consciousness.

Tóth has been celebrated as a martyr for the resistance against the communist government. As a martyr, Tóth has often been described in the context of her femininity, which may have also affected the extent of foreign coverage of the case. The status of her virginity became a major point of dispute in her legacy, with some versions of her story arguing that she was pregnant at the time of her arrest, exemplifying the horrors of the communist regime, while others argue that she was a virgin, emphasizing her purity. She was one of the few women recognized for her involvement in the revolution prior to an increased interest in women's history.

=== Post-communist rehabilitation ===
Tóth's image as a symbol of anti-communism was promoted in post-communist Hungary in the 1990s, and her conviction was appealed to the Hungarian government twice during this period though it was denied both times. It was first appealed by her relatives in 1990, but the Supreme Court of Hungary upheld her guilt, ruling that her status as a medical worker held her to a higher standard than other dissidents who had been exonerated. It was appealed a second time by the Political Prisoners Association, but it was ended by a newly formed socialist government in 1994. This action further politicized Tóth's legacy, and her cause was taken up by the center-right government formed in 1998, inspiring a law that was passed in 2000 which effectively overturned the communist government's political convictions. This law is informally known as the "Ilona Tóth law".

A television documentary about Tóth was created in 1998 to rehabilitate her image. She has been identified as the "Hungarian Joan of Arc" after the term was used by her co-defendant Gyula Obersovszky. As a journalist, Obersovszky honored Tóth extensively in his writing, publishing a book about her in the late 1990s. A statue of Tóth was unveiled at a private museum in Budapest on 23 October 2000, with justice minister Ibolya Dávid speaking in Tóth's honor at the ceremony. The statue was moved to the Semmelweis Medical School after Tóth's exoneration in 2001.
