= Ilona Csepreghyné-Meznerics =

Hungarian stratigrapher and invertebrate paleontologist

- Born: 25 May 1906; Szabadka, Kingdom of Hungary (today Subotica, Serbia)
- Died: 14 January 1977 (aged 70); Budapest, Hungary
- Education: University of Budapest (B.A., Ph.D)
- Spouse: Dr. Bela Csepreghy
- Scientific career
- Fields: Stratigraphy and invertebrate paleontology
- Workplaces: Natural History Museum, Vienna; Hungarian Natural History Museum

Ilona Csepreghyné-Meznerics, née Meznerics (25 May 1906 – 14 January 1977), was a Hungarian stratigrapher and invertebrate paleontologist.

== Life ==
Ilona Csepreghyné-Meznerics was born in Szabadka, in the Kingdom of Hungary (today, Subotica, Serbia). She moved to Budapest, the capital of Hungary, as a teenager and graduated with honors of the Gymnasium for Girls in 1924. She earned high school teacher's certificates in chemistry and physics in 1929 and received her Ph.D. (cum laude) in geology with a focus on paleontology from the University of Budapest the following year. Csepreghyné-Meznerics was awarded a three-year stipend in 1931 to work at the Natural History Museum (German: Naturhistorisches Museum) in Vienna, Austria and worked in the paleontology department there. Upon her return to Budapest, she taught high school from 1935 to 1940. Csepreghyné-Meznerics got a job as a researcher at the Hungarian Natural History Museum (Hungarian: Magyar Természettudományi Múzeum) in Budapest that year and married Dr. Bela Csepreghy in 1945. She was promoted to curator in 1948 and became the head of the geology-paleontology department in 1951. Csepreghyné-Meznerics remained until there until 1970 and then she worked for the State Geological Institute from 1971 until her retirement in 1973. She died on 14 January 1977.

== Activities ==
Csepreghyné-Meznerics' initial specialty was Tertiary molluscs found in various areas of Hungary and Austria and she "later worked on Miocene forms, and made a major contribution on Pectinids. Her paper designating the importance of Pectinids for stratigraphy was published in the Memoirs of the French Geological Society. She continued working after her retirement, but did not finish incorporating her Hungarian data into the revised volume of the Lexique stratigraphique before her death.
