= Ilona Breģe =

Latvian composer

Ilona Breģe (born 20 May 1959 in Riga, Soviet Union) is a composer, pianist and musicologist.

== Life ==
Breģe was born in Riga. She graduated from the Latvian Music Academy (former State Conservatory) as a pianist in 1983 and as a composer in1986. She became a Doctor of Art in 1993.

Breģe was the solo pianist in the Latvian Philharmonic (1983–92) until she became a researcher in the Latvian Science Academy in the Literature, Folklore and Art department in 1998. She was the General Manager of the Latvian National Symphony Orchestra from 1997 to 2006. In 2006, she became the Managing Director of the Riga Professional Symphonic Band.

Her music has been played by Kremerata Baltica.

== Selected compositions ==
- 2008 Concert for Violin and Chamber Orchestra, dedicated to Baiba Skride. First performance 17 January 2009, Great Guild Concert Hall in Riga. Soloist Baiba Skride, chamber orchestra "Sinfonietta Riga", conductor Normunds Sne. 20 minutes
- 2007 Otrais Rīgas koncerts (Riga Concerto No. 2) for violin, viola and chamber orchestra. First performance 17 February 2008, Latvian Music Academy Concert Hall. Soloists Darja Smirnova, Arigo Strals, orchestra "Sinfonia Concertante", conductor Andris Vecumnieks. 17 minutes
- 2007 Simple Seasons, cycle for string orchestra. 9 minutes
- 2006 Riga Concerto No. 1 for Two Violins, Violoncello, String Orchestra and Percussion. First Performance 29 June 2006, Kremerata Festival in Sigulda, Latvia. Soloists Sandis Steinberts, Ruta Lipinaitite, Eriks Kirsfelds, chamber orchestra "Kremerata Baltica". 16 minutes
- 2006 Symphony No. 2. First Performance 12 December 2006, Latvian National Opera. Latvian National Symphony Orchestra, conductor Normunds Vaicis. 22 minutes
- 2004 Symphony No. 1. First Performance 27 April 2004, Great Guild Concert Hall in Riga. Latvian National Symphony Orchestra, conductor Andris Nelsons. 21 minutes
- 2001 Symphonic Epiloque. 8 minutes
- 1998 Concerto No. 2 for Piano and Symphony Orchestra. 18 minutes
- 1988 Living Water, chamber opera based on the play by Mara Zalite. 90 minutes
- 1987 Preconcert Music for Two Pianos. 10 minutes
- 1986 Concerto for Marimba and String Orchestra. 13 minutes
- 1985 Sonata for Piano. 8 minutes
- 1984 Concerto for Piano and Strings. 17 minutes
- 1984 Divi liriski intermeco (2 Lyrical Intermezzos) for viola and piano

== Publications ==
- Teātris senajā Rīgā – vēstures fakti, vācu kultūra un skats pāri diviem gadsimtiem (Theatre in Old Riga – Historical Facts, German Culture, and an Overview of Two Centuries). – Riga: Zinātne, 1997, 228 pages;
- Cittautu mūziķi Latvijā 1401–1939 (Foreign Musicians in Latvia 1401–1939) [Lexicon]. – Riga: Zinātne, 2001, 232 pages.
