= Ilona M. Otto =

Climate change scientist and professor

Ilona M. Otto is a social scientist and professor at the University of Graz.

== Career ==
In 2003, Otto completed her master studies in sociology at the Adam Michiewicz University in Poznań, Poland. She graduated with a PhD in Resource Economics from Humboldt University of Berlin in 2007. Otto spent 10 years doing extensive research at the Potsdam Institute for Climate Impact Research. Since July 2020 she holds the Professorship for Societal Impacts of Climate Change at the Wegener Center, University of Graz, Austria.

Otto is a member of the Committee on Operationalizing Sustainable Development at the National Academy of Sciences, Engeeniering and Medicine, a member of Working Group Energy Transition at the Austrian Academy of Sciences, and a member of the Climate Advisory Board (Klimabeirat) in the City of Graz. In 2023 she was awarded the Falling Walls Prize, in Social Sciences and Humanities.

== Research work ==
Otto is a researcher specializing in climate change, its societal impacts, and potential mitigation strategies. Her work includes the study of emissions resulting from lifestyle choices and the identification of social tipping points.

She co-led the CASCADES (Cascading Climate Risks) project, funded by the EU Horizon 2020 program. and she coordinated the REBOOST (A Boost for Rural Lignite Regions) project under the Climate Knowledge and Innovation Communities (KIC).

Otto also contributes to the monitoring of other Horizon 2020 and Horizon Europe projects. These include ENBEL (Enhancing Belmont Research Action at the Belmont Forum), which links climate change and health, and HighHorizons, which concentrates on heat indicators for global health. Her work with these projects involves the development of early warning systems and the implementation of adaptation and mitigation measures to lessen the impact of heat on pregnant women, infants, and health workers in the European Union and Africa.

Otto is a co-author of the World Bank report titled "Turn Down the Heat: Confronting the New Climate Normal".
