= Ilona Prunyi =

Hungarian music educator

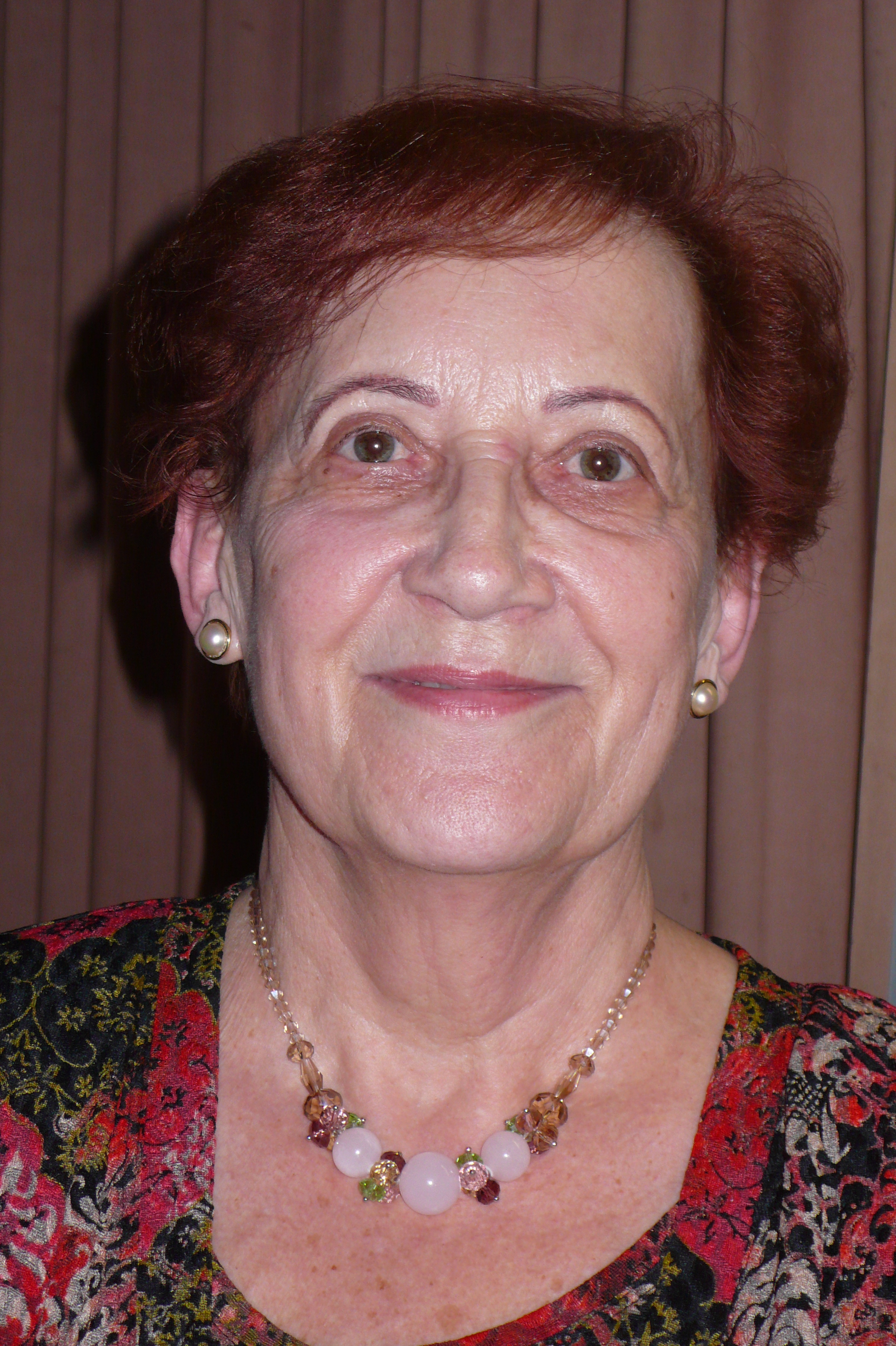
Ilona Prunyi in 2012

Ilona Prunyi (born 1 May 1941 in Debrecen) is a Hungarian pianist, and music educator. She received a prize at the Liszt Competition in Budapest in 1994, the Bartók Pásztory Prize in 2011, and the Hungarian Merited Artist Award in 2015.

== Life ==
Ilona Prunyi studied from 1958 to 1963 at the Franz Liszt Academy of Music in Budapest, with József Gát and András Mihály. She became a lecturer there, but struggled with a long illness in the first few years. In Paris she took a course with Yvonne Lefébure. She was friends with Annie Fischer.

Prunyi made her concert debut in 1974, and has since played with the Hungarian orchestras, chamber orchestras, played piano four hands, and also performed as a soloist. She has been awarded the Artisjus Award several times.

Prunyi also performs of lesser known composers, such as the work of Stephen Heller and Ernő Dohnányi.
