= Stephen Michael Elonka =

American engineer

Stephen Michael Elonka (died 1983) was the author of numerous technical books, including Standard Plant Operators' Manual. He also wrote a book of the adventures of one Marmaduke Surfaceblow, a fictional engineer who solves difficult problems in ingeniously simple ways. POWER Magazine's Marmaduke Awards were named for this character. Books by Elonka have been translated into Spanish, Portuguese, and Chinese.
