= István Moldován =

Hungarian painter and graphic artist

- Born: 11 September 1911; Kolozsvár
- Died: 8 September 2000; Budapest

István Moldován (Kolozsvár, 11 September 1911 – Budapest, 8 September 2000) was a Hungarian painter and graphic artist.

== Life ==
He started his studies of art at the Kolozsvár Fine Arts College in 1930, and continued from 1931 at the Hungarian Fine Arts College in Budapest. His masters were István Réti and István Szőnyi. In parallel to his studies in Budapest he also studied from János Thorma and János Krizsán at the Nagybánya artists' colony. In 1942 the Kolozsvár Transylvanian National Museum, held its annual "Art Week" and the "Kolozsvár in the Arts" competition, where he was awarded the second prize. The same year he also received a certificate of merit from the "Szinyei Merse Pál Association". In 1943 he received scholarship from Collegium Hungaricum Rome. From 1946 he exhibited his works mostly on Individual exhibitions in Hungary. Between 1948 and 1950 he worked in Transylvania, upkeeping himself from a scholarship. In Budapest, he lived at the famous Artist colony of Százados Road. He painted a lot, and also made graphics arts and mosaics. His art pieces are part of the collection of the Hungarian National Gallery.

== Individual exhibitions ==
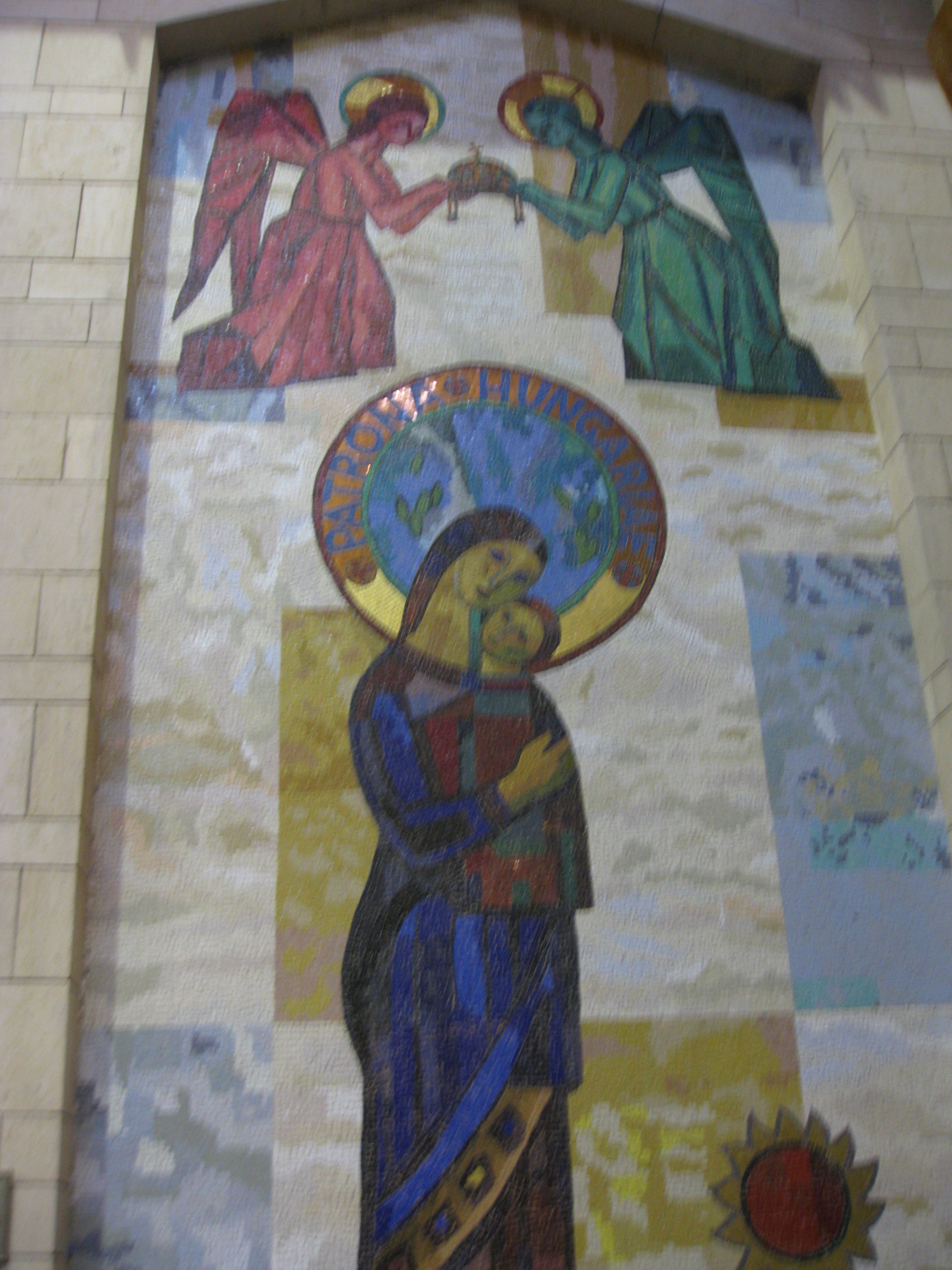
Patrona Hungaria titled mosaic in the Basilica of the Annunciation, Nazareth

- 1959 Institute of Cultural Contacts, Budapest
- 1960 Nagykanizsa
- 1963 Kiskunfélegyháza
- 1966, 1973 Medgyessy Hall, Debrecen
- 1969, 1975 Munkácsy Hall, Békéscsaba
- 1971 Mednyánszky Hall, Budapest
- 1973 Gyöngyös
- 1977 Rudnay Hall, Eger
- 1979 Veszprém
- 1955, 1962, 1981 Csók Gallery, Budapest
- 1983 Miskolci Galéria, Szőnyi István Hall, Miskolc
- 1984 School Gallery, Csepel, Budapest
- 1986, 1998 Vigadó Gallery, Budapest

== Assorted grouped exhibitions ==
- 1942 Art Week, Transylvanian National Museum, Kolozsvár
- 1942 Painting Tender of the St. István Week at Nagybánya, István Hotel
- 1943 opening ceremony of Kolozsvár Arts Hall
- 1950-1965 Hungarian Arts Exhibition 1-10.
- 1957 Autumn Exhibition, Art Hall, Budapest
- 1981 World of forests, Csontváry Hall, Pécs
- 1988 Autumn Exhibition, Art Hall, Budapest
- 1996 Paintings of Nagybánya art in private collections, Budapest Gallery, Budapest
- 1998 Exhibition of the Százados Road Artist Colony, Pataky Gallery, Budapest
- 2000 Honored be the master I. (exhibition of Szőnyi students), Szőnyi István Memorial Museum

== Art-pieces in public space ==
- Pedagogy College, Pécs (mosaic, 1964)
- Hospital of Salgótarján (mosaic, 1968)
- Nazareth, Basilica of Annunciation, southern wall, near a pillar (mosaic: Patrona Hungariae, 1969)
- Videoton Ceremonial Hall (mosaic, 1970, Székesfehérvár)
