= Ilona DeVito di Porriasa =

Hungarian-born countess

- Born: Ilona Mária Teleki von Szék; April 23, 1939; Cluj-Napoca, Romania
- Died: April 15, 2013 (aged 73)
- Occupation: Banker
- Employer: Merrill Lynch
- Known for: Concealing aristocratic background while working in U.S. finance
- Spouse: Lino DeVito di Porriasa (m. 1975; died 2008)

Ilona DeVito di Porriasa (April 23, 1939 – April 15, 2013), born as Ilona Mária Teleki von Szék in Cluj-Napoca, Romania, was a Hungarian-born countess who built a successful life in finance in the United States after fleeing the Communist regime in Romania. She worked as a banker in New York City, while keeping her aristocratic background secret, which was gradually revealed only after her death in 2013.

== Early life ==
Ilona Teleki de Szek was born in 1939 in a castle in Transylvania, a part of Romania at the time. Her father, a count, served as Transylvania's representative to Hungary, and her mother held the title of baroness. Among her relatives was Pál Teleki, a former Hungarian prime minister known for enacting several anti-Semitic laws. During the final stages of World War II, the family faced persecution following the Soviet occupation of Hungary and Romania. Ilona's father was imprisoned and remained separated from the family for two decades. The Teleki family's property was confiscated, and they were expelled from their home, which was later converted into a clinic and botanical garden. They relocated to a converted stable without running water; Ilona worked in a shoe factory, her mother took in laundry and sewing, and her brother worked on a farm. Amid growing anti-Hungarian sentiment in Romania, the government frequently disrupted the children's education and monitored the family's correspondence. Ilona's father eventually escaped to the United States and was granted asylum. In 1964, he succeeded in securing the family's release from Romania through bribery, allowing them to reunite in the United States.

== Life in exile ==
DeVito di Porriasa did not speak English when she arrived, but she held a series of jobs, beginning at a hosiery factory in the Bronx and later working as a teletypist at a financial firm. Eventually, she began working as a banker in Merrill Lynch. After starting her career on Wall Street without a college degree, she demonstrated strong analytical skills and was promoted to the position of market analyst, where she focused on studying financial trends and advising on investments. She joined Merrill Lynch's securities research department in the early 1970s and remained there until her retirement in 2005.

In 1975, Ilona von Szék married Lino DeVito di Porriasa, who came from an Italian noble family. Mr. DeVito di Porriasa died in 2008.

== Death ==
DeVito di Porriasa died in April 2023. Many friends and colleagues only learned of her noble background and family history after her death.
