= Ilona Szoyer =

Opera singer (b. 1880. d. 1956)

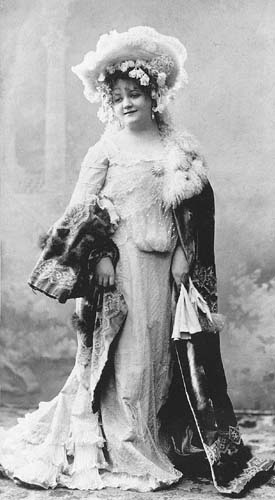
Ilona Szoyer circa 1900

Ilona Szoyer (1880–1956) was a soprano opera singer who had a prominent career in early 20th-century Budapest.

== Early life ==
Ilona Szoyer (alternatively known as Ilonka Szoyer) was born in Debrecen on July 24, 1880. Her debut as a performer took place in Leipzig in 1899 in a production of Zar und Zimmermann, when Szoyer was 19.

== Career ==
In the course of her career, Szoyer was a member of the Vienna Carltheater, the Magyar Theatre in Budapest, and the People's Opera in Budapest. Many of her early performances were in comedic operettas. She also received acclaim for roles in opera.

Szoyer was a member of the premiere cast of Wiener Blut in 1899. She played the role of Clairette in La fille de Madame Angot at the Magyar Theatre in 1900, and later on featured in Adolf Mérei's Hungarian-language adaptation of Die lustige Witwe.

Szoyer was the first Hungarian to perform the role of Musetta in Giacomo Puccini's La Boheme with the Royal Hungarian Opera. She performed the role in 1906 while Puccini was in the audience alongside Elza Szamosi and József Gábor.

Szoyer's voice was captured by several early recording companies including the Gramophone Company, Lyrophon, and Odeon.

Szoyer retired from the stage in 1915. She died in Budapest in 1956.

== Personal life ==
Szoyer married conductor Márkus Dezső. She had two children, Imre Márkus and Ily Márkus-Szoyer.
