= Ilona Makláry-Buzek =

Hungarian volleyball player (born 1945)

Personal information
- Nationality: Hungarian
- Born: 7 August 1945 (age 79); Budapest, Hungary

Sport
- Sport: Volleyball

Ilona Makláry-Buzek (born 7 August 1945) is a Hungarian volleyball player. She competed in the women's tournament at the 1972 Summer Olympics.
