= Ilona Rolfes =

German microwave engineer

Ilona Rolfes (born 1973) is a German microwave engineer who studies devices for generating and measuring terahertz radiation and their applications including in health technology, environmental modeling, and short-range radar imaging systems for vehicles. She is a professor at Ruhr University Bochum.

== Education and career ==
Rolfes was born in Hagen in 1973. She became a student of electrical engineering at Ruhr University Bochum, where she received a diploma (the German equivalent of a master's degree) in 1997, and completed a doctorate in 2002.

After continued postdoctoral research at Ruhr University Bochum, she became a junior professor of electrical engineering at Leibniz University Hannover from 2005 to 2009 and director of the Institute for Radiofrequency and Microwave Engineering from 2006 to 2009. She returned to Ruhr University Bochum as a professor and chair of Microwave Systems in 2010.

== Recognition ==
Rolfes received the European Microwave Prize in 2001 and the outstanding young engineer award of the IEEE Microwave Theory & Technology Society in 2011.

She was elected to acatech, the German Academy of Science and Engineering, in 2015, and to the North Rhine-Westphalian Academy of Sciences, Humanities and the Arts in 2023.
