= Ilona Sojda =

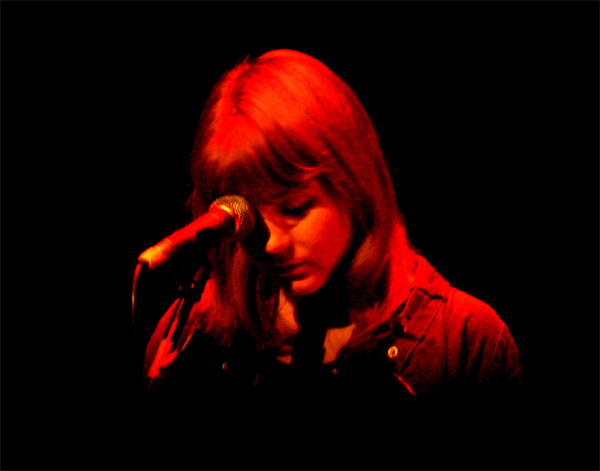
- Ilona Sojda at a rehearsal, 2006

Background information
- Born: 26 May 1987 (age 38); Kielce, Poland
- Genres: Sung poetry, Acoustic Music, Alternative Music, Electronica
- Occupations: Vocalist, musician
- Instruments: Vocals, guitar
- Website: ilonasojda.pl

Ilona Sojda (born 26 May 1987) is a Polish singer. Her work has its origin in sung poetry, an imprecise, unspecific music genre that merges lyrical ballads with written poetry.

== Awards ==
She was the winner of the 41st Student Song Festival in Kraków, an influential cultural event that first took place in 1962, known then as the National Student Song Contest. She also won musical contests in Rybnik, Radom, and Elbląg and was one of the finalists of the Review of Stage Songs, being the 27th edition of Poland's oldest actors' song interpretation contest, which is set in Wrocław.

== Kaddish for Rose ==
Since 2005, she cooperates with Marek Tercz, poet and composer from Kielce, who created music and lyrics for their recital 'Kaddish for Rose'. It was introduced for the first time to a wider audience during the 42nd Student Song Festival in 2006, however the official premiere took place a year later at Kraków's Tempel Synagogue in 2007.

This project is meant to be released as a concept album that is inspired by the story of Rose, a Jewish eighteen-year-old girl killed in the Auschwitz concentration camp during World War II.

The music is greatly influenced by Jewish traditional music, although it is accompanied by both acoustic and less conventional electronic instruments, such as electronic drums and synthesizers.

== Personal life ==
Currently she studies applied psychology at the Jagiellonian University.
