= Metropolia University of Applied Sciences =

Institute of higher education in Helsinki Metropolitan Area

Coordinates: 60.1910°N 24.9021°E

- Metropolia Ammattikorkeakoulu
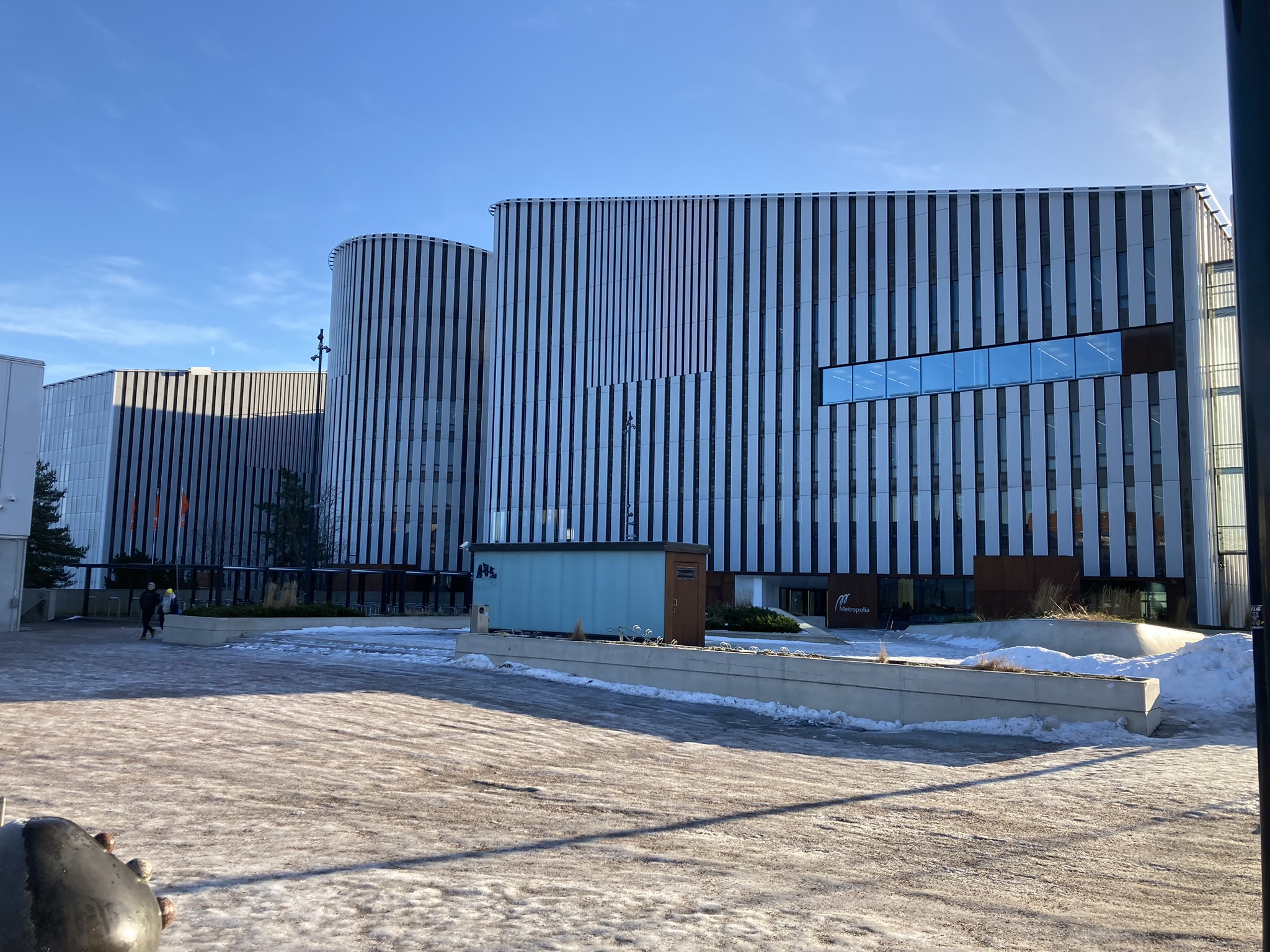
- Myllypuro campus
- Motto: Osaamista ja oivallusta tulevaisuuden tekemiseen
- Motto in English: Expertise and insight for the future
- Type: Public Osakeyhtiö
- Established: 2007 (opened 2008)
- Rector: Riitta Konkola
- Academic staff: 1,000
- Students: 16,400
- Location: (Finland) Helsinki & Vantaa & Espoo, Finland
- Colors: Orange and Grey
- Website: www.metropolia.fi

The Metropolia University of Applied Sciences (Finnish: Metropolia ammattikorkeakoulu) is a University of Applied Sciences in Finland. The university has four campuses, offering 93 degree programs in business, culture, healthcare and social services, and technology.

== Background and history ==
In 2008, EVTEK University of Applied Sciences and Helsinki Polytechnic Stadia merged to create the Metropolia University of Applied Sciences. This merger aimed to consolidate resources, expertise, and educational offerings to create a more robust and comprehensive academic environment. The university emphasizes innovation, practical learning, and collaboration with industry.

== Campuses ==
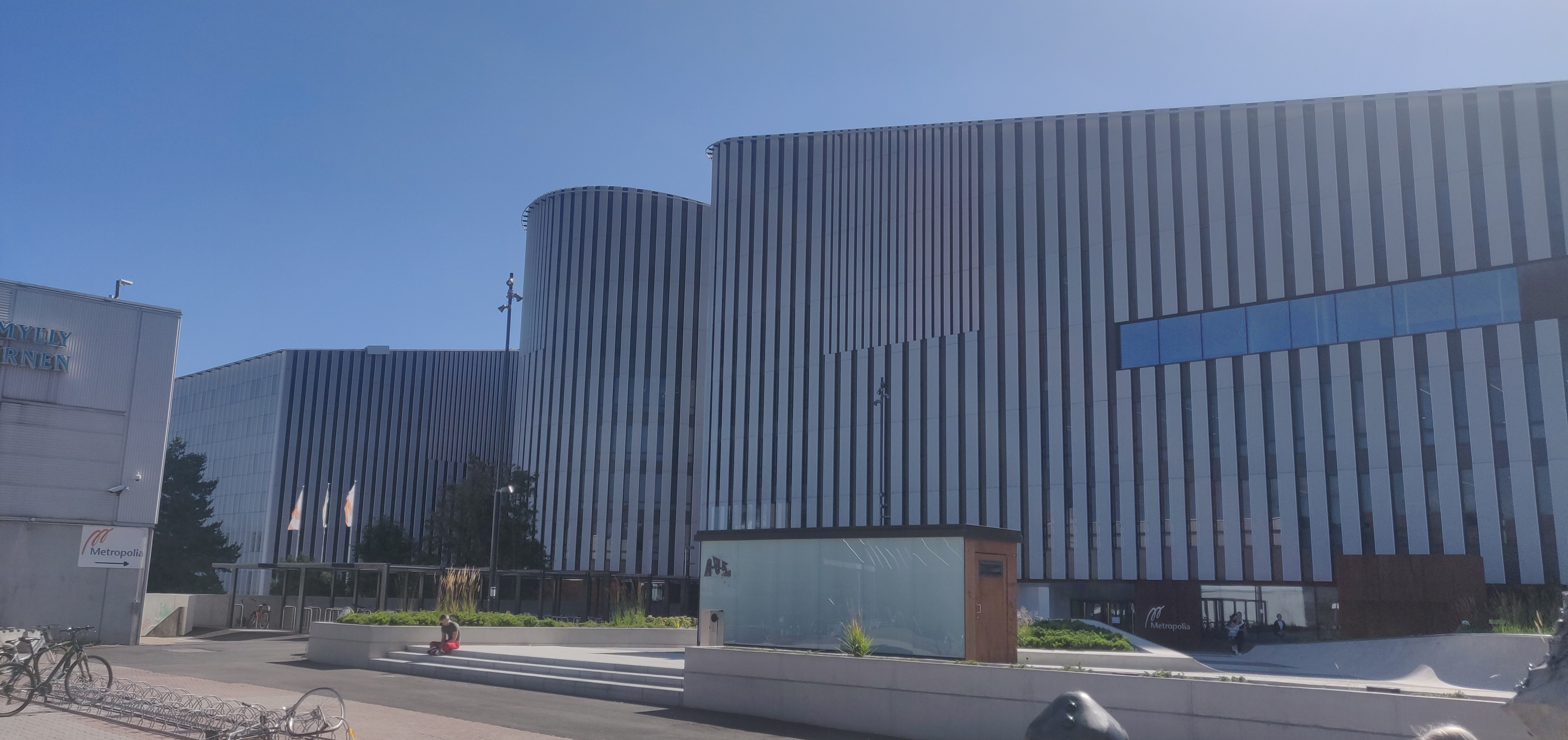
Myllypuro campus, fully opened in 2020, is located directly above the M2 metro line

Metropolia is located in the Helsinki Metropolitan Area. Currently, Metropolia has four campuses: the Arabia and Myllypuro campuses in Helsinki, the Karamalmi campus in Espoo, and the Myyrmäki campus in Vantaa.

=== Helsinki ===
==== Myllypuro Campus ====
The Myllypuro campus offers programs in medicine and architecture. The first sections of the campus to be constructed opened in January 2019 with 3000 students and 250 employees, with the second part opening in January 2020. Construction of the campus cost about 165 million euros. There are currently about 6000 students enrolled in programs on this campus.

==== Arabia Campus ====
The Arabia campus offers programs in culture, conservation, and design.

=== Vantaa ===
==== Myyrmäki Campus ====
The Myyrmäki campus offers programs in industrial technology and international business. There are currently 3500 students and 230 staff members on this campus. Construction of the final extension of this campus was completed in August 2018.

=== Espoo ===
==== Karamalmi Campus ====
The Karamalmi campus was opened in August 2019 after the Leppävaara Campus was closed on March 4, 2019 due to safety reasons. The property owner of the Leppävaara campus, the City of Espoo, informed Metropolia about the poor condition of the campus structures on February 14, 2019, and urged Metropolia to move campus activities away as soon as possible.

== Other University Buildings ==
=== Helsinki ===
- Arabia Campus: Arabiankatu 2
- Arabia Campus: Hämeentie 161
- Kaupintie

=== Espoo ===
- Koskelo Hall

== Academics ==
Metropolia offers 43 bachelor's degrees, with awarded titles varying by field. These include titles such as Bachelor of Engineering, Bachelor of Business Administration, Bachelor of Healthcare, Bachelor of Social Services, and Bachelor of Culture and Arts.

Additionally, 26 master's-level programs are available, while doctoral studies are not offered at Metropolia. However, with the ongoing Bologna process, graduates with bachelor's degrees from Metropolia are eligible to apply for master's programs at traditional universities.

Metropolia takes part in the Finnish Joint Application. After meeting the basic requirements to be admitted to undergraduate studies, international applicants take part in an entrance examination organized by Metropolia. This test is different for each degree, with applicants accepted based on their scores. Applicants may also apply by using SAT results. Minimum scores for each degree may vary but they average around an SAT score of 1250.

=== International relations ===
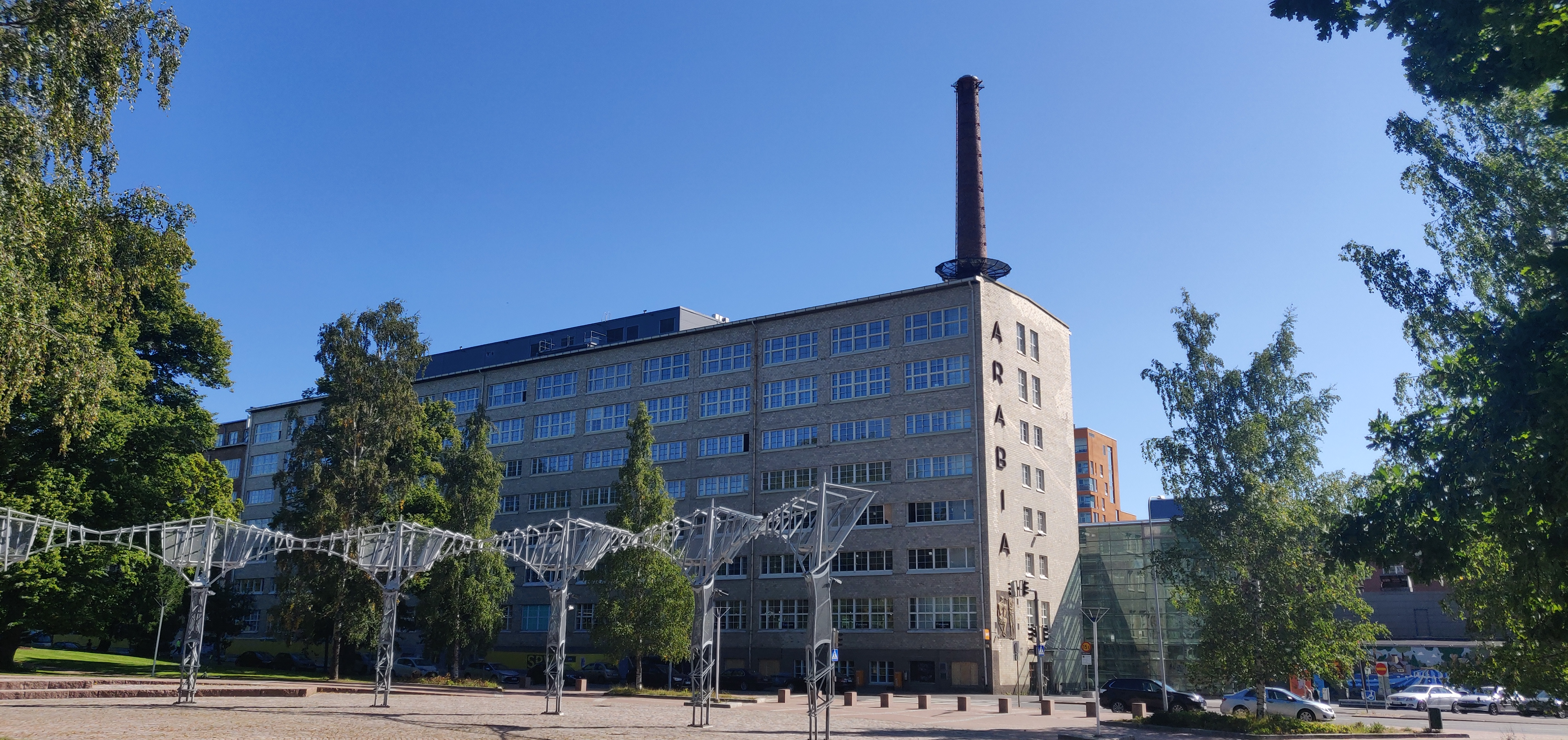
Arabia campus, located next to the Vanhankaupunginselkä bay

The Metropolia University of Applied Sciences is the largest International University of Applied Sciences in Finland. International activities at Metropolia include international degree programs, student and teacher mobility, work placement opportunities abroad, and other projects.

- Erasmus+
- La Trobe University
- Kwantlen Polytechnic University
- Lakehead University
- University of Saskatchewan
- Chitkara University
- Heimerer College
- Universiti Teknologi Malaysia
- Namibia University of Science and Technology
- Durban University of Technology
- International Institute of Health Sciences
- University of Colombo
- Weber State University
- Texas Tech University
- The Hong Kong University of Science and Technology
- Tokyo National College of Technology (TNCT)
- Sendai National College of Technology
- Universiti Sains Malaysia
- Universiti Teknologi Malaysia
- Polytechnic of Namibia
- Unitec Institute of Technology: Civil Engineering
- Peter the Great Saint-Petersburg Polytechnical University
- St. Petersburg State University of Economics
- Temasek Polytechnic
- Ajou University
- Kyungpook National University
- Seoul National University of Science and Technology
- Haute Ecole d'Ingénierie et de Gestion du Canton de Vaud (HEIG-VD)
- Yuan Ze University
- Sirindhorn International Institute of Technology (SIIT)
- Oregon Institute of Technology, Klamath Falls
- Temple University
- Toyo University
- Lingnan University
- Donghua University
- Minnesota State University in Mankato

=== Networks ===
- European Association for International Education (EAIE)
- HUMINT, (Human Resource Management)
- Nice Network
- Association Européenne des Conservatoires (AEC)
- ANMA, Nordiska Konservatoriorådet
- European Network for Conservation-Restoration Education (ENCoRE)
- International Association of Film and Television Schools (CILECT)
- International Association of Jazz Educators (IAJE)
- International Association of Schools of Jazz (IASJ)
- International Council of Museums - Committee for Conservation (ICOM-CC)
- International Institute for Conservation (IIC)
- Cumulus, International Association of Universities and Colleges of Art, Design and Media
- Consortium of Higher Education in Health and Rehabilitation in Europe (COHEHRE)
- European Association of Training Centres for Socio-Educational Care Work (FESET)
- European Network of Occupational Therapy (ENOTHE)
- World Federation on Occupational Therapy (WFOT)
- European Network for Physiotherapy in Higher Education (ENPHE)
- European Network of Podiatry in Higher Education (ENPODHE)
- Osteopathic European Academic Network (OSEAN)
- The European Council of Optometry and Optics (ECOO)
- The European Academy of Optometry and Optics (EAOO)
- European Society for Engineering Education (SEFI)
- Network for the Development of European Programmes in Higher Education (BUSINET)
- UNESCO International Centre for Engineering Education (UICEE)
- FEANI:European Federation of National Engineering Associations

=== Studies ===
==== Business ====
All undergraduate programs in business at Metropolia culminate in a Bachelor of Business Administration (BBA) degree. While some specializations offer the possibility of earning a double degree with partner universities, the core curriculum focuses on a strong foundation in business principles. In 2017, Metropolia's business program achieved the highest ranking among Finnish Universities of Applied Sciences.

Teaching takes place at the Myyrmäki Campus. The school offers three bachelor-level business studies programs, two of which are in English. Metropolia also offers learning pathways leading to an MBA degree.

==== Healthcare and social services ====
Metropolia conducts many degrees in the fields of healthcare and social services. There are two bachelor's degrees in English (nursing and social services) and 15 in Finnish. The school also offers master-level studies leading to the MHA (Master of Health Administration) degree. All degrees in these fields are hosted at the Myllypuro Campus.

Metropolia has a unique learning environment called the Well-Being and Health Village. In this place, students provide free medical services under supervision. The idea behind the Health Village is to give students a taste of real-world medical work experience. Some of the services are: prosthetics and orthotics services; osteopathy services; and physiotherapy services.

==== Culture ====
All culture courses are conducted in Finnish. There are 8 undergraduate degrees and 7 master's degrees. All teaching takes place at the Arabia Campus and nearby premises. Metropolia UAS is the first Finnish university to offer a degree focused entirely on XR design.

==== Technology ====
Studies in the field of technology take place on two campuses. The Myyrmäki campus mainly focuses on industrial technology, and teaching at the Karamalmi campus is more IT-based. Metropolia has a wide variety of industrial degrees, such as automotive engineering and industrial management. Industrial-based studies are conducted in Finnish or in English, depending on the degree program. The school has two IT programs, one of them in English.

== RDI ==
=== Innovation hubs ===
- Clean and Sustainable Solutions
- Customer-oriented Wellbeing and Health Services
- Data-driven Construction
- Functional City for People
- Smart Mobility

=== Other RDI programs ===
- Service Robotics
- Customer-oriented Technology Applications
- Urban Farm
- Sohjoa Baltic
