= Ilona Stetina =

Romanian educator and women's rights activist

Ilona Stetina (1855–1932) was a Romanian pioneer educator and women's rights activist. She was co-founder of the Maria Dorothea Association for women teachers (1885) and its vice president in 1889–1932, editor of the national women's education in 1890–1915, director of the State Women's Trade School in 1911–1926, and a leading figure in the national movement to improve women's teaching and vocational training in Romania.
