= Helsinki Polytechnic Stadia =

University of applied sciences in Helsinki, Finland

- Type: Public
- Active: 1996–2008
- Rector: Riitta Konkola
- Administrative staff: 745 (2005)
- Students: 9500 (2005)
- Location: Helsinki, Finland
- Website: www.stadia.fi

The Stadia main building located in Hietalahti, Helsinki.

Helsinki Polytechnic Stadia (Finnish: Helsingin ammattikorkeakoulu Stadia) was a multidisciplinary institution of higher education, at its time one of the biggest polytechnics in Finland. Helsinki Polytechnic Stadia offered students an international learning environment with a wide variety of higher education level studies.

In August 2008, Helsinki Polytechnic Stadia merged with EVTEK University of Applied Sciences to form Helsinki Metropolia University of Applied Sciences (Finnish: Metropolia Ammattikorkeakoulu).

Helsinki Polytechnic Stadia was established in 1996 through the merger of eight existing institutions of higher education maintained by the City of Helsinki. The number of full-time students was around 9 500 in more than 32 bachelor's and master's degree programmes.

Helsinki Polytechnic Stadia adopted the European Credit Transfer and Accumulation System (ECTS) at the beginning of the academic year 2005–2006.

Stadia offered degree programmes in English in Nursing, Social Services, Industrial Management and Information Technology. All the other degree programmes were taught in Finnish.

The activities of Helsinki Polytechnic Stadia were situated in 16 locations in the city of Helsinki.

Stadia promoted a learning environment that encouraged international cooperation and cultural awareness through teacher and student exchanges and projects in several countries. Stadia took part in various teacher and student exchange and student trainee programmes e.g. within the framework of the European Union's Socrates programme / Erasmus programme, Leonardo da Vinci programme, and the Nordplus programme.

In 2005, Helsinki Polytechnic Stadia had some 160 students from different countries in Europe, North America, Africa and Asia. In the same year, the number of outgoing students through different exchange and trainee programmes and bilateral agreements was nearly 400. In 2005, about 140 teachers or experts from Helsinki Polytechnic Stadia took part in staff exchange, and Helsinki Polytechnic welcomed over 60 teachers of their international counterparts.
