= Ilona Riipinen =

Finnish physicist (born 1982)

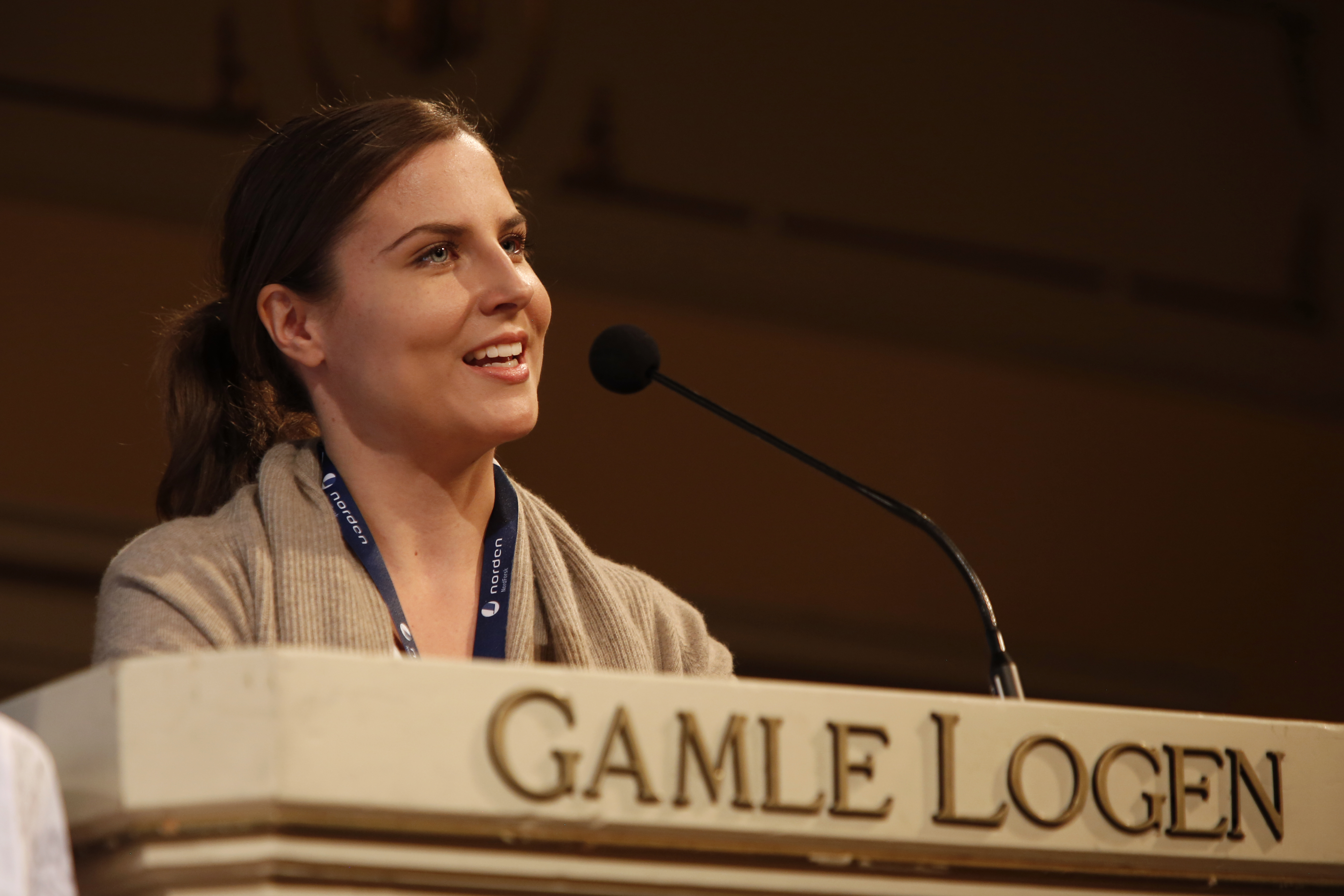
- Born: 1982; Lempäälä, Finland
- Citizenship: Finnish
- Education: University of Helsinki
- Scientific career
- Fields: Atmospheric science
- Workplaces: Stockholm University
- Academic advisors: Neil Donahue
- Website: www.aces.su.se/staff/ilona-riipinen/

Ilona Riipinen (born 1982, Lempäälä) is a Finnish physicist, working as a professor of atmospheric sciences at Stockholm University. She has received funding for her research from many funds as well as the European Research Council.

Riipinen completed her undergraduate and graduate studies at the University of Helsinki within the successful aerosol research collaboration of Markku Kulmala and collaborators. Riipinen gained her doctorate in 2008 from the Department of Physics of the University of Helsinki, with a thesis examining the early stages of atmospheric particulate formation and growth titled "Observations on the first steps of atmospheric particle formation and growth". She has held the title of docent at the University of Helsinki since 2011.

Riipinen worked as an assistant professor at the University of Stockholm from 2011 to 2016. Since 2017 she has been a professor of atmospheric sciences at the same university. As a researcher she has published in highly regarded scientific journals (Nature, Science). In 2016 and 2017 she was one of the world's most cited geoscientists included in a group of the world's 3100 most highly cited researchers.
