= Ilona Szwarc =

Polish photographer (born 1984)

Ilona Szwarc (born 1984 in Warsaw) is a Polish photographer now residing in the United States. She attended the School of Visual Arts and Yale University. In 2013 she assembled her series American Girls, comprising 100 photographs created with a 4x5 large format camera. In 2015 she created the magazine I am a Woman and I Feast on Memory.

In 2013 she received a third place World Press Photo prize, in the Observed Portraits category. In 2014 she received the Arnold Newman Prize for New Directions in Photographic Portraiture. In 2015 she was awarded the Richard Benson Prize for Excellence in Photography and in 2020 she was a finalist for a Hopper Prize. In 2017 she was included in the FOAM Talent London exhibition (for artists under the age of 35).

Her work is in the Yale University Art Gallery and the National Museum of Women in the Arts (NMWA).
