= Ilona Otto =

German voice actress

Ilona Otto (born March 27, 1979), now known as Ilona Brokowski, is a German voice actress. She was originally a theater actress, but gave this up later. She then went on to earn a diploma in psychology at the Free University of Berlin.

She is best known for her dubbing roles as Rory Gilmore in Gilmore Girls, Claire Littleton in Lost, Dawn Summers in Buffy the Vampire Slayer, and Danni in The Tribe. She is also known for her Western animation (The Adventures of Jimmy Neutron: Boy Genius) and Eastern animation (Digimon Adventure) roles.

== Roles ==
=== Television animation ===
- The Adventures of Jimmy Neutron: Boy Genius (Jimmy Neutron (Debi Derryberry))
- Bleach (manga) (Orihime Inoue (Stephanie Sheh))
- Braceface (Sharon Spitz (Alicia Silverstone, Stacey DePass))
- Digimon Adventure (T. K. Takaishi (Hiroko Konishi))
- LazyTown (Ziggy (Guðmundur Þór Kárason)
- Love Hina (Mutsumi Otohime (Satsuki Yukino))
- Mobile Suit Gundam SEED (Flay Allster (Hōko Kuwashima))
- The Powerpuff Girls (Buttercup (Elizabeth Daily))
- What's with Andy? (Teri (Cathy Cavadini, Holly Gauthier-Frankel))
- Winx Club - Layla

=== Theatrical animation ===
- Jimmy Neutron: Boy Genius (Jimmy Neutron (Debi Derryberry))

=== Video games ===
- Kingdom Hearts (Yuffie Kisaragi (Yumi Kakazu))
- Kingdom Hearts II (Yuffie Kisaragi (Yumi Kakazu))

=== Live action ===
- 8 Mile (Janeane (Taryn Manning))
- Æon Flux (Una Flux (Amelia Warner))
- American Wedding (Cadence Flaherty (January Jones))
- The Black Dahlia (Martha Linscott (Rachel Miner))
- Buffy the Vampire Slayer (Dawn Summers (Michelle Trachtenberg))
- Cadet Kelly (Kelly Collins (Hilary Duff))
- Crossroads (Mimi (Taryn Manning))
- Dumb and Dumberer: When Harry Met Lloyd (Jessica (Rachel Nichols))
- The Fog (Mandi (Sonja Bennett))
- Gilmore Girls (Rory Gilmore (Alexis Bledel))
- Ginger Snaps (Brigitte Fitzgerald (Emily Perkins))
- Ginger Snaps 2: Unleashed (Brigitte Fitzgerald (Emily Perkins))
- Ginger Snaps Back (Brigitte Fitzgerald (Emily Perkins))
- The Hills Have Eyes (Brenda Carter (Emilie de Ravin))
- Jarhead (Kristina (Brianne Davis))
- Lord of War (Candy (Tanit Phoenix))
- Lost (Claire Littleton (Emilie de Ravin))
- Nip/Tuck (Vanessa (Kate Mara))
- The O.C. (Sadie Campbell (Nikki Reed))
- Red Eye (Cynthia (Jayma Mays))
- The Tribe (Danni (Ella Wilks))
- The Americans (Kate)
